= List of German films of the 2010s =

This is a list of some of the most notable films produced in Cinema of Germany in the 2010s.

For an alphabetical list of articles on German films, see Category:2010s German films.

== 2010 ==
Title	Director	Cast	Genre	Notes
8:28 AM	Christian Alvart	Nadeshda Brennicke, Mehdi Nebbou, Mark Waschke	Drama	a.k.a. 8 Uhr 28
2030 – Aufstand der Jungen	Jörg Lühdorff	Bettina Zimmermann, Lavinia Wilson, Barnaby Metschurat	Science fiction	a.k.a. 2030: Exploiting the Grandchildren
Aghet – Ein Völkermord	Eric Friedler	Gottfried John, Martina Gedeck, Joachim Król, Sandra Hüller, Peter Lohmeyer, Axel Milberg, Ulrich Noethen	Documentary, History	a.k.a. Aghet: A Genocide
The Albanian	Johannes Naber	Nik Xhelilaj	Drama	a.k.a. Der Albaner. German-Albanian co-production
Amigo	Lars Becker	Jürgen Prochnow, Tobias Moretti, Florian David Fitz, Uwe Ochsenknecht, Kostja Ullmann	Thriller	a.k.a. Amigo: Dead on Arrival
Anatomy of Evil	Andreas Prochaska	Heino Ferch, Nina Proll, Stefan Kurt	Crime	a.k.a. Traces of Evil. German-Austrian co-production
Angel of Revenge	Tim Trageser	Gesine Cukrowski, Katharina Wackernagel, Matthias Koeberlin	Thriller	a.k.a. Racheengel – Ein eiskalter Plan
Animals United	Reinhard Klooss, Holger Tappe	—N/a	Animated film	a.k.a. The Animals' Conference. British-German co-production
At Ellen's Age	Pia Marais	Jeanne Balibar, Georg Friedrich, Julia Hummer, Alexander Scheer	Drama	
Auch Lügen will gelernt sein	Michael Wenning	Tim Seyfi, René Steinke, Sophie Schütt	Comedy	
Die Auflehnung	Manfred Stelzer	Jan Fedder, André Hennicke	Drama	
Ausgerechnet Afrika	Axel Barth	Jasmin Gerat, Alexander Sternberg, Rike Schmid, Carsten Norgaard, Marcel Hensema	Drama	
Autumn Gold	Jan Tenhaven	Alfred Proksch, Gabre Gabric	Documentary, Sport	
Ayla	Su Turhan	Pegah Ferydoni, Mehdi Moinzadeh, Türkiz Talay, Sesede Terziyan	Drama	
Bartleby, the Scrivener: A Story of Wall Street	Andreas Honneth	James Thiérrée	Drama	
Based Down South	Martina Priessner		Documentary	
Bedways	RP Kahl	Miriam Mayet, Matthi Faust, Lana Cooper	Drama	
Bei manchen Männern hilft nur Voodoo	Thomas Nennstiel	Felicitas Woll, Simone Thomalla, Florentine Lahme, Sven Martinek	Comedy	
Bella Vita	Thomas Berger	Andrea Sawatzki, Thomas Sarbacher, Juliane Köhler, Lisa Martinek, Tobias Oertel	Drama	
Black Forest	Gert Steinheimer	Johanna Klante, Nikola Kastner, Adrian Topol	Horror	
Blackout	Sebastian Vigg	Ann-Kathrin Kramer, Tobias Oertel	Thriller	a.k.a. Electric Shock a.k.a. 380.000 Volt – Der große Stromausfall
Blessed Events	Isabelle Stever	Annika Kuhl	Drama	a.k.a. Glückliche Fügung
Boundaries	Andreas Kleinert	Matthias Habich	Drama	a.k.a. Barriere
Boxhagener Platz	Matti Geschonneck	Gudrun Ritter, Michael Gwisdek, Samuel Schneider, Meret Becker, Jürgen Vogel, Horst Krause	Comedy	Premiered at the 60th Berlin International Film Festival, Shortlisted for the German nomination for the Academy Award for Best Foreign Language Film
Brownian Movement	Nanouk Leopold	Sandra Hüller	Drama	Dutch-Belgian-German co-production
C.I.S. – Chaoten im Sondereinsatz	Erik Haffner	Sasha, Martina Hill, Dieter Thomas Heck	Crime comedy, Parody	
Call Girl Undercover	Ulli Baumann	Jeanette Biedermann, Stephan Luca	Crime comedy	
Cave of Forgotten Dreams	Werner Herzog		Documentary	German-French-Canadian-British-American co-production
Chandani: The Daughter of the Elephant Whisperer	Arne Birkenstock		Documentary	
The Children of Blankenese	Raymond Ley	Alice Dwyer, Janek Rieke, Harald Schrott, Jennifer Ulrich	Historical drama	
Cindy Does Not Love Me	Hannah Schweier	Clemens Schick, Peter Weiss, Anne Schäfer	Road movie	
The City Below	Christoph Hochhäusler	Nicolette Krebitz, Robert Hunger-Bühler	Drama	a.k.a. Unter dir die Stadt
Civil Courage	Dror Zahavi	Götz George	Drama	a.k.a. Moral Courage
Collapse	Diethard Küster	Julia Koschitz, Roman Knižka, Axel Milberg	Crime	a.k.a. Der Einsturz – Die Wahrheit ist tödlich
The Color Out of Space	Huan Vu	Michael Kausch	Horror	
The Coming Days	Lars Kraume	Bernadette Heerwagen, Daniel Brühl, August Diehl, Johanna Wokalek	Science fiction	a.k.a. The Days to Come
Congo	Peter Keglevic	Maria Simon, Jörg Schüttauf, Florence Kasumba	Drama	
The Day of the Cat	Wolfgang Panzer	Bruno Ganz, Ulrich Tukur, Marie Bäumer, Christiane Paul, Edgar Selge, Justus von Dohnányi	Drama	a.k.a. Der grosse Kater. Swiss-German co-production
Death in Istanbul	Matti Geschonneck	Jürgen Vogel, Heino Ferch, Ina Weisse, Peter Simonischek	Thriller	
Deckname Annett – Im Netz der Stasi	Roland May	Bettina Zimmermann	Docudrama, History	
Delivering Hope	Dagmar Hirtz	Brigitte Hobmeier	Drama	a.k.a. Die Hebamme – Auf Leben und Tod
Den Tagen mehr Leben!	Jan Ruzicka	Thekla Carola Wied, Manfred Zapatka, Peter Haber	Drama	
Destination: Freedom	Thomas Jauch	Sophie von Kessel, Hendrik Duryn, Oliver Mommsen	Drama	a.k.a. Westflug – Entführung aus Liebe
Eichmann's End: Love, Betrayal, Death	Raymond Ley	Herbert Knaup, Henriette Confurius, Ulrich Tukur, Axel Milberg	Historical drama	a.k.a. Eichmann's Fate
Eleven Uncles	Herbert Fritsch	Alexander Khuon, Herbert Fritsch	Drama	a.k.a. 11 Uncles
The End Is My Beginning	Jo Baier	Bruno Ganz, Elio Germano	Drama	German-Italian co-production
Es war einer von uns	Kai Wessel	Maria Simon, Anja Kling, Devid Striesow	Crime drama	
Fasten à la Carte	Hans-Erich Viet	Dietmar Bär, Inka Friedrich	Comedy	
The Final Storm	Uwe Boll	Luke Perry, Steve Bacic, Lauren Holly	Thriller	German-Canadian co-production
Eine flexible Frau	Tatjana Turanskyj	Mira Partecke	Drama	a.k.a. The Drifter
The Fourth Revolution: Energy	Carl-A. Fechner		Documentary	a.k.a. The 4th Revolution: Energy Autonomy
Fremdgehen	Jeanette Wagner	Thomas Sarbacher, Tanya Barut, Antje Schmidt	Drama	
Friendship!	Markus Goller	Matthias Schweighöfer, Friedrich Mücke	Comedy	
The Fröhlich Family: From Bad to Worse	Thomas Nennstiel	Jürgen Tarrach, Simone Thomalla, Rudolf Kowalski, Leslie Malton, Henriette Confurius	Comedy	a.k.a. Familie Fröhlich – Schlimmer geht immer
The Frontier	Roland Suso Richter	Benno Fürmann, Thomas Kretschmann, Anja Kling, Marie Bäumer, Ronald Zehrfeld, Katja Riemann	Drama	
Frösche petzen nicht	Manfred Stelzer	Pierre Besson, Katja Flint	Crime	
Der Gewaltfrieden	Bernd Fischerauer	Jürgen Tarrach, Adriana Altaras, Rainer Basedow, Mathieu Carrière, Hans-Michael Rehberg, Alexander Held, Serge Avédikian	Docudrama, History	
Give Me Your Heart	Nicole Weegmann	Peter Lohmeyer, Paul Kuhn, Mina Tander	Drama, Music	
Das Glück ist eine Katze	Matthias Steurer	Robert Atzorn, Eva Mattes	Comedy	
Gräfliches Roulette	Ulrich König	Fritz Wepper, Leonard Lansink	Comedy	
Greed	Dieter Wedel	Ulrich Tukur, Devid Striesow, Sibel Kekilli, Jeanette Hain, Uwe Ochsenknecht, Katharina Wackernagel, Heinz Hoenig, Kai Wiesinger, Dieter Laser	Crime	
Habermann	Juraj Herz	Mark Waschke, Karel Roden	War drama	Czech-German-Austrian co-production
The Hairdresser	Doris Dörrie	Gabriela Maria Schmeide, Natascha Lawiszus	Comedy	a.k.a. Die Friseuse. Premiered at the 60th Berlin International Film Festival
Hanni & Nanni	Christine Hartmann	Sophia Münster, Jana Münster, Hannelore Elsner, Heino Ferch, Katharina Thalbach	Family	a.k.a. The Twins at St. Clare's a.k.a. Hanni und Nanni
Headshots	Lawrence Tooley	Loretta Pflaum, Samuel Finzi, Laura Tonke	Drama	
Henri 4	Jo Baier	Julien Boisselier, Armelle Deutsch, Hannelore Hoger	Biography, History	a.k.a. Henri Quatre a.k.a. Henry of Navarre. German-French-Spanish-Austrian co-production
Highland Fling	John Delbridge	Henriette Richter-Röhl, Johannes Zirner, Stefanie Stappenbeck, Mareike Carrière, Rolf Becker, Eleonore Weisgerber	Drama	a.k.a. Eine Liebe in den Highlands
Hochzeitspolka	Lars Jessen	Christian Ulmen, Katarzyna Maciąg	Comedy	
The Holy Land of Tyrol	Philipp J. Pamer	Inga Birkenfeld, Wolfgang Menardi	Drama	a.k.a. Bergblut. German-Italian co-production
Honeymoon for Four	Sigi Rothemund	Axel Milberg, Saskia Vester, Jana Voosen, Axel Schreiber	Comedy	a.k.a. Hochzeitsreise zu viert
Die Hummel	Sebastian Stern	Jürgen Tonkel, Inka Friedrich	Comedy	
Ice Fever	Peter Keglevic	Heiner Lauterbach, Isabella Ferrari, Tom Schilling	Thriller	a.k.a. Whiteout
Ich trag dich bis ans Ende der Welt	Christine Kabisch	Elmar Wepper, Ann-Kathrin Kramer	Drama	German-Austrian co-production
Im Brautkleid durch Afrika	Sebastian Vigg	Wolke Hegenbarth, Stephan Luca, Sello Motloung, Luthuli Dlamini	Comedy	
In aller Stille	Rainer Kaufmann	Nina Kunzendorf	Crime	a.k.a. Unspoken
In the Jungle	Elmar Fischer	Ronald Zehrfeld, Ina Weisse, Heino Ferch	Drama	
In the Shadows	Thomas Arslan	Mišel Matičević, Karoline Eichhorn, Uwe Bohm, Hanns Zischler	Crime drama	
An Intern for Life	Ingo Rasper	Roman Knižka, Anna Brüggemann, August Zirner	Comedy	a.k.a. My Brilliant Career
Invisible Touch	Ulli Baumann	Diana Amft, Stephan Luca, Lucas Gregorowicz, Gaby Dohm, Rüdiger Vogler	Comedy, Fantasy	a.k.a. Kein Geist für alle Fälle
Iron Doors	Stephen Manuel	Axel Wedekind, Rungano Nyoni	Thriller	
Jerry Cotton	Philipp Stennert, Cyrill Boss	Christian Tramitz, Christian Ulmen, Monica Cruz, Moritz Bleibtreu	Parody, Crime comedy	
Jew Suss: Rise and Fall	Oskar Roehler	Tobias Moretti, Moritz Bleibtreu, Martina Gedeck, Justus von Dohnányi	Drama, War	
Karl the Butcher vs. Axe	Andreas Schnaas, Timo Rose	Andreas Schnaas, Timo Rose	Horror	
Keep Lying, Darling	Gabriela Zerhau	Götz George, Hannelore Elsner, Oliver Wnuk, Ludger Pistor, Barbara Rudnik	Comedy	a.k.a. Lüg weiter, Liebling
Keiner geht verloren	Dirk Kummer	Sylvester Groth, Carmen-Maja Antoni, Eva Mattes, Hanno Koffler, Jennipher Antoni	Comedy	
Kennedy's Brain	Urs Egger	Iris Berben, Heino Ferch, Christophe Malavoy, Mikael Nyqvist, Rolf Lassgård, Mata Gabin, Émil Abossolo-Mbo, Hans-Michael Rehberg	Thriller	German-Swedish co-production
Kreutzer kommt	Richard Huber	Christoph Maria Herbst, Rosalie Thomass, Florence Kasumba, Leslie Malton, Ludwig Trepte, Natalia Avelon, Katharina Müller-Elmau	Crime comedy	a.k.a. Die Tote im Nachtclub
The Last 30 Years	Michael Gutmann	Rosalie Thomass, David Rott, Barbara Auer, August Zirner	Comedy	a.k.a. The Last Thirty Years
The Last Employee	Alexander Adolph	Christian Berkel, Bibiana Beglau	Horror	
Last Moment	Sathyan Ramesh	Matthias Habich, Gila von Weitershausen, Ulrike C. Tscharre, Thomas Thieme	Drama	
The Last Patriarch	Michael Steinke	Mario Adorf, Hannelore Elsner, Ursula Karven, Wong Li Lin, Tan Kheng Hua, Jason Chan	Drama	
Der letzte schöne Herbsttag	Ralf Westhoff	Julia Koschitz, Felix Hellmann	Comedy	
Liebe und andere Delikatessen	Matthias Tiefenbacher	Diana Amft, Steffen Wink, Lale Yavaş	Comedy	
Liebe vergisst man nicht	Matthias Tiefenbacher	Fritz Karl, Anna Loos	Comedy	
Life Is Too Long	Dani Levy	Markus Hering, Veronica Ferres, Elke Sommer, Udo Kier, Gottfried John, Meret Becker, Heino Ferch, Yvonne Catterfeld	Comedy	
Live Is Life	Wolfgang Murnberger	Jan Josef Liefers, Joachim Fuchsberger	Comedy, Music	a.k.a. Die Spätzünder. German-Austrian co-production
The Lost Father	Hermine Huntgeburth	Ulrike Krumbiegel, Edgar Selge, Jeanette Hain	Drama	
The Lost Future	Mikael Salomon	Sean Bean	Science fiction	South African-German co-production
Lotta & die alten Eisen	Edzard Onneken	Josefine Preuß, Barbara Auer, Heidy Forster, Friedrich Schoenfelder	Comedy	a.k.a. Lotta und die alten Eisen a.k.a. Die letzten Dinge
Love Is Just a Word	Carlo Rola	Nadeshda Brennicke, Vinzenz Kiefer, Miroslav Nemec	Drama	
Love Your Enemy	Niki Stein	Katharina Wackernagel, Benjamin Sadler, Stephan Kampwirth, Stefanie Stappenbeck	Drama	
Lucky Punch	Joseph Orr	Alexandra Neldel, Hendrik Duryn	Comedy	a.k.a. Glückstreffer – Anne und der Boxer
Mahler on the Couch	Percy Adlon, Felix Adlon	Johannes Silberschneider, Karl Markovics, Barbara Romaner, Friedrich Mücke	Biography	German-Austrian co-production
Masserberg	Martin Enlen	Anna Fischer, Pasquale Aleardi, Maria Simon, Ernst Jacobi	Drama	
Der Mauerschütze	Jan Ruzicka	Benno Fürmann, Annika Kuhl	Drama	
Max Schmeling	Uwe Boll	Henry Maske	Biography, Sport	a.k.a. Fist of the Reich
Men Don't Lie	Bettina Woernle	Maruschka Detmers	Drama	
Mia and the Millionaire	Dominic Müller	Felicitas Woll, Kai Schumann	Comedy	a.k.a. Küss dich reich
Morgen musst Du sterben	Niki Stein	Uwe Kockisch, Matthias Habich, Susanne Lothar, Eleonore Weisgerber, Gesine Cukrowski, Gisela Schneeberger, Franz Dinda	Thriller	
Murder Is No Fairy Tale	Urs Egger	Peter Lohmeyer	Thriller	a.k.a. Brother Grimm a.k.a. Wolfsfährte
My Family Kills Me	Christiane Balthasar	Iris Berben, August Zirner	Comedy	
Nanga Parbat	Joseph Vilsmaier	Florian Stetter, Andreas Tobias	Drama	
Nemesis	Nicole Mosleh	Ulrich Mühe, Susanne Lothar	Thriller	
Neue Vahr Süd	Hermine Huntgeburth	Frederick Lau, Rosalie Thomass, Miriam Stein, Albrecht Schuch, Robert Gwisdek, Ulrich Matthes, Hinnerk Schönemann	Comedy	
Neukölln Unlimited	Agostino Imondi, Dietmar Ratsch	Hassan Akkouch	Documentary, Music	
Not My Daughter	Wolfgang Murnberger	Lisa Martinek, Bernhard Schir, Nikola Rudle	Drama	Austrian-German co-production
Nydenion	Jack Moik	Jack Moik	Science fiction	a.k.a. Star Cruiser
Orly	Angela Schanelec	Natacha Régnier, Bruno Todeschini, Mireille Perrier, Émile Berling	Drama	German-French co-production
Picco	Philip Koch	Constantin von Jascheroff, Frederick Lau, Joel Basman, Martin Kiefer	Crime drama	
The Poll Diaries	Chris Kraus	Paula Beer, Edgar Selge, Tambet Tuisk	Drama	German-Estonian-Austrian co-production
Rammbock: Berlin Undead	Marvin Kren	Michael Fuith, Theo Trebs, Emily Cox	Horror	a.k.a. Siege of the Dead
The Red Room	Rudolf Thome	Katharina Lorenz, Seyneb Saleh, Peter Knaack, Isabel Hindersin, Hanns Zischler	Comedy	
Relations	Stefan Kornatz	Devid Striesow, Nicolette Krebitz, Lars Eidinger	Drama	a.k.a. Verhältnisse
Resident Evil: Afterlife	Paul W. S. Anderson	Milla Jovovich	Action, Horror	German-Canadian-French-American co-production
Restoring Grace	John Delbridge	Rebecca Immanuel, Julia Brendler, Anna Hausburg, Patrick Rapold, Helmut Zierl	Drama	a.k.a. Festtagsstimmung
The Robber	Benjamin Heisenberg	Andreas Lust, Franziska Weisz	Crime drama	a.k.a. Der Räuber. German-Austrian co-production
Rock It!	Mike Marzuk	Emilia Schüle, Daniel Axt, Maria Ehrich	Musical	
The Route	Florian Froschmayer	Maximilian Brückner, Stephan Luca	Drama	German-Austrian co-production
Run If You Can	Dietrich Brüggemann	Jacob Matschenz, Robert Gwisdek, Anna Brüggemann	Comedy	
Same to You	Hans-Günther Bücking	Rita Russek	Drama	a.k.a. Ihr mich auch
Sasha	Dennis Todorović	Saša Kekez, Tim Bergmann, Predrag Bjelac	Drama	
Schatten der Erinnerung	Hartmut Griesmayr	Julia Stemberger, Thure Riefenstein, Michael Mendl, Elke Winkens	Drama	
Schurkenstück	Torsten C. Fischer	Katharina Schüttler, Oliver Korittke, Franz Dinda, Vladimir Burlakov, Sebastian Urzendowsky, Arnel Tači	Drama	
Sechs Tage Angst	Markus Fischer	Katharina Böhm, Thomas Sarbacher	Thriller	a.k.a. 6 Tage Angst
The Secret of the Whales	Philipp Kadelbach	Veronica Ferres, Christopher Lambert, Mario Adorf	Drama	a.k.a. No Sky Over Whales
Eine Sennerin zum Verlieben	Dietmar Klein	Michaela May, Günther Maria Halmer	Comedy	a.k.a. A Dairymaid to Fall in Love with
Shahada	Burhan Qurbani	Maryam Zaree, Jerry Hoffmann, Carlo Ljubek, Vedat Erincin	Drama	a.k.a. Faith
The Shared Happiness	Thomas Freundner	Petra Schmidt-Schaller, Udo Wachtveitl	Drama	a.k.a. Das geteilte Glück
She Deserved It	Thomas Stiller	Liv Lisa Fries, François Goeske, Veronica Ferres	Drama	
Sickness of Youth	Dieter Berner	Alina Levshin, Stella Hilb, Matthias Weidenhöfer, Florens Schmidt	Drama	a.k.a. Pains of Youth a.k.a. Youth Is a Sickness
The Silence	Baran bo Odar	Sebastian Blomberg, Ulrich Thomsen, Wotan Wilke Möhring, Katrin Sass, Karoline Eichhorn, Burghart Klaußner	Thriller	
Single by Contract	Marc Rothemund	Anna Fischer, Kostja Ullmann	Comedy, Music	a.k.a. Groupies bleiben nicht zum Frühstück
The Sinking of the Laconia	Uwe Janson	Franka Potente, Andrew Buchan, Brian Cox, Ken Duken, Thomas Kretschmann	War	British-German co-production
Sister	Margarethe von Trotta	Rosemarie Fendel, Cornelia Froboess, Matthias Habich	Drama	
The Sleeper's Wife	Edzard Onneken	Yvonne Catterfeld, René Ifrah, Ercan Durmaz, Ludger Pistor	Thriller	
Snowblind	Kilian Manning	Robert Lyons, Mala Ghedia, Jana Pallaske, Nadine Petry, Wim Wenders	Science fiction	
Snowman's Land	Tomasz Thomson	Jürgen Rißmann, Reiner Schöne	Crime comedy	
Solange du schliefst	Nicole Weegmann	Katharina Böhm, Mark Waschke, Götz Schubert	Drama	
Ein Sommer auf Sylt	Thomas Nennstiel	Christine Neubauer, Brigitte Janner, Jochen Horst, David C. Bunners, Nadeshda Brennicke	Comedy	a.k.a. A Summer on Sylt
Spear of Destiny	Florian Baxmeyer	Kai Wiesinger, Jürgen Prochnow, Bettina Zimmermann, Fabian Busch	Adventure	a.k.a. Die Jagd nach der Heiligen Lanze
Spook Inn	Holger Haase	Annette Frier, Pasquale Aleardi, Thomas Heinze, Sonja Gerhardt, Michael Kessler, Andreas Schmidt	Comedy, Fantasy	a.k.a. Im Spessart sind die Geister los
Stop the World	Hartmut Griesmayr	Christine Neubauer, Filip Peeters, Martin Feifel	Drama	
Stronger Than Blood	Oliver Kienle	Jacob Matschenz, Burak Yiğit	Crime	a.k.a. Closer than Blood a.k.a. Bis aufs Blut – Brüder auf Bewährung
Takiye	Ben Verbong	Erhan Emre, Stipe Erceg, Özay Fecht, Fahriye Evcen, Ali Sürmeli, Rutkay Aziz, Suzan Anbeh	Thriller	
This Will Be Life	Alexander Riedel	Judith Al Bakri, Ulrike Arnold, Jochen Strodthoff	Drama	a.k.a. This Will Be the Life a.k.a. Morgen das Leben
Three	Tom Tykwer	Sophie Rois, Sebastian Schipper, Devid Striesow, Angela Winkler	Drama	
Thyme Out	Felix Herzogenrath	Felicitas Woll, Tobias Oertel	Drama	a.k.a. Glücksboten
Die Tochter des Mörders	Johannes Fabrick	Sophie von Kessel, Matthias Brandt	Crime	
Tod einer Schülerin	Mark Schlichter	Matthias Brandt, Corinna Harfouch, Adrian Topol, Lavinia Wilson, Laura Berlin	Thriller	
Tom Atkins Blues	Alex Ross	Alex Ross, Stefan Lochau, Megan Gay, Tessa Mittelstaedt	Comedy	
Die Toten vom Schwarzwald	Thorsten Näter	Heino Ferch, Nadja Uhl	Thriller	
Transfer	Damir Lukačević	B. J. Britt, Regine Nehy, Ingrid Andree, Hans-Michael Rehberg	Science fiction	Premiered at the 2010 Fantastic Fest
Transit	Philipp Leinemann	Clemens Schick, Annika Blendl, Bernd Michael Lade	Drama	a.k.a. Transit – Am Ende der Straße
Undercover Love	Franziska Meyer Price	Anja Kling, Henning Baum, Martina Hill, Elyas M'Barek, Kurt Krömer	Action comedy	
Until Nothing Remains	Niki Stein	Silke Bodenbender, Felix Klare, Nina Kunzendorf, Kai Wiesinger, Suzanne von Borsody, Robert Atzorn	Drama	a.k.a. Till Faith Do Us Part
Der Uranberg	Dror Zahavi	Vinzenz Kiefer, Nadja Bobyleva, Henry Hübchen, Christian Redl	Drama, Disaster	
Vater aus heiterem Himmel	Ulli Baumann	Fritz Wepper, Olga von Luckwald	Comedy	
Vater Morgana	Till Endemann	Christian Ulmen, Felicitas Woll, Michael Gwisdek	Comedy	
The Village	Robert Sigl	Eleanor Tomlinson, Finn Atkins, David Bamber, Murray Melvin, Kevin Colson	Horror	a.k.a. Hepzibah – Sie holt dich im Schlaf
Vincent Wants to Sea	Ralf Huettner	Florian David Fitz, Karoline Herfurth, Heino Ferch	Drama	a.k.a. Vincent will Meer
We Are the Night	Dennis Gansel	Nina Hoss, Karoline Herfurth, Anna Fischer, Jennifer Ulrich	Vampire horror film	
When We Leave	Feo Aladag	Sibel Kekilli	Drama	a.k.a. Die Fremde
Who Dares to Love	Wolf Gremm	Christine Neubauer, Hardy Krüger Jr., Suzan Anbeh, Ruth Maria Kubitschek, Nirut Sirijanya, Justin Hills, Charles Brauer	Drama	a.k.a. Between Sisters
The Whore	Hansjörg Thurn	Alexandra Neldel, Thure Riefenstein, Götz Otto, Bert Tischendorf	Drama, Adventure	a.k.a. The Royal Siren a.k.a. The Wandering Harlot
Wie ein Licht in der Nacht	Florian Baxmeyer	Christiane Hörbiger, Klaus J. Behrendt, Friedrich von Thun, Susanna Simon	Drama	
Wie ein Stern am Himmel	Hartmut Griesmayr	Christine Neubauer, David C. Bunners, Franziska Walser, César Caillet	Drama	
Womb	Benedek Fliegauf	Eva Green, Matt Smith, Lesley Manville	Drama	Hungarian-German-French co-production
Young Goethe in Love	Philipp Stölzl	Alexander Fehling, Miriam Stein, Moritz Bleibtreu, Burghart Klaußner, Henry Hübchen, Hans-Michael Rehberg	Biography	a.k.a. Goethe!
Die Zeit der Kraniche	Josh Broecker	Stella Kunkat, Bernhard Schir	Drama	German-Austrian co-production
Zeiten ändern dich	Uli Edel	Elyas M'Barek, Moritz Bleibtreu, Hannelore Elsner	Drama, Music	a.k.a. Time You Change a.k.a. Times Change You
Zimmer mit Tante	Thomas Kronthaler	Jutta Speidel, Nadia Hilker, Ingo Naujoks, Michael Roll, Max Kupfer	Comedy	
Zimtstern und Halbmond	Matthias Steurer	Omar El-Saeidi, Robert Atzorn, Lisa Maria Potthoff, Gundi Ellert	Comedy	
Zurück zum Glück	Wolfgang Dinslage	Susanna Simon, Anna Hausburg, Max von Pufendorf, Tim Oliver Schultz	Comedy, Fantasy	a.k.a. Back to Happiness

== 2011 ==
Title	Director	Cast	Genre	Notes
4 Days in May	Achim von Borries	Aleksei Guskov	War	a.k.a. Four Days in May. German-Russian-Ukrainian co-production
205 – Room of Fear	Rainer Matsutani	Jennifer Ulrich, André Hennicke	Horror	Remake of Room 205 (2007)
Above Us Only Sky	Jan Schomburg	Sandra Hüller, Georg Friedrich, Felix Knopp	Drama	a.k.a. Über uns das All
Adam's End	Richard Wilhelmer	Robert Stadlober, Paula Kalenberg, David Winter, Eva-Maria May	Drama	
Die Akte Kleist	Torsten Striegnitz	Alexander Beyer, Meret Becker	Biography, Docudrama	
Alive and Ticking	Andi Rogenhagen	Jasna Fritzi Bauer	Comedy	a.k.a. Ein Tick anders
Almanya: Welcome to Germany	Yasemin Şamdereli	Denis Moschitto, Aylin Tezel, Fahri Yardım	Comedy	
An einem Tag in ... Duisburg. Todesfalle Loveparade	Kaspar Heidelbach	Waldemar Kobus	Docudrama	a.k.a. An einem Tag in Duisburg – Todesfalle Love Parade
Anduni	Samira Radsi	Irina Potapenko, Florian Lukas, Tilo Prückner	Drama	German-Luxembourgian co-production
Anonymous	Roland Emmerich	Rhys Ifans, Vanessa Redgrave	Adventure	German-British co-production
Baikonur	Veit Helmer	Alexander Asochakov, Marie de Villepin, Sitora Farmonova,	Comedy	German-Russian-Kazakhstani co-production
Bastard	Carsten Unger	Martina Gedeck, Markus Krojer, Antonia Lingemann	Thriller	
Beate Uhse	Hansjörg Thurn	Franka Potente, Ray Fearon, Hans Werner Meyer, Henry Hübchen	Biography	
Before Tomorrow	Joachim Schönfeld	Axel Buchholz, Regine Zimmermann, Axel Sichrovsky	Drama	a.k.a. Gegen Morgen
The Berlin Project	Ivo Trajkov	Blerim Destani, Udo Kier, Nicolette Krebitz	Thriller	a.k.a. 90 Minuten – Das Berlin Projekt
Bermuda-Triangle North Sea	Nick Lyon	Hannes Jaenicke, Bettina Zimmermann, Josefine Preuß, Gudrun Landgrebe, Karoline Eichhorn	Disaster	
Black Brown White	Erwin Wagenhofer	Clare-Hope Ashitey, Fritz Karl	Drama	Austrian-German-Luxembourgian co-production
Blaubeerblau	Rainer Kaufmann	Devid Striesow, Stipe Erceg, Nina Kunzendorf	Drama	a.k.a. Blueberryblue
Blutzbrüdaz	Özgür Yıldırım	Sido, B-Tight, Claudia Eisinger	Musical	a.k.a. Bloodbrotherz
Born to Dance	Hans-Günther Bücking	Julie Engelbrecht, Marion Mitterhammer, Vinzenz Kiefer, Emily Cox, Christoph M. Ohrt	Thriller	a.k.a. Die Tänzerin – Lebe deinen Traum. German-Austrian co-production
Brand	Thomas Roth	Josef Bierbichler, Angela Gregovic, Denis Moschitto, Erika Deutinger	Drama	German-Austrian co-production
Burnout	Verena S. Freytag	Maryam Zaree	Drama	a.k.a. Abgebrannt
Calm at Sea	Volker Schlöndorff	Léo-Paul Salmain, Marc Barbé, Ulrich Matthes	War	French-German co-production
Carl & Bertha	Till Endemann	Felicitas Woll, Ken Duken	Biography	a.k.a. Carl and Bertha a.k.a. Carl und Bertha
The Cold Sky	Johannes Fabrick	Christine Neubauer, Eric Hermann, Marc Hermann	Drama	a.k.a. Frozen Sky
Colors in the Dark	Sophie Heldman	Bruno Ganz, Senta Berger	Drama	a.k.a. Satte Farben vor Schwarz. Swiss-German co-production
Color of the Ocean	Maggie Peren	Hubert Koundé, Sabine Timoteo, Álex González	Drama	German-Spanish co-production
Combat Girls	David Wnendt	Alina Levshin	Drama	a.k.a. Kriegerin
Cracks in the Shell	Christian Schwochow	Stine Fischer Christensen, Ulrich Noethen, Ronald Zehrfeld	Drama	a.k.a. Die Unsichtbare
The Dark Nest	Christine Hartmann	Christian Berkel, Katharina Müller-Elmau, Petra Schmidt-Schaller, Andreas Schmidt	Thriller	
A Day for a Miracle	Andreas Prochaska	Ken Duken, Julia Koschitz	Drama	a.k.a. The Miracle of Carinthia. German-Austrian co-production
The Day I Was Not Born	Florian Cossen	Jessica Schwarz, Michael Gwisdek	Drama	a.k.a. Das Lied in mir. German-Argentine co-production
Dr. Ketel	Linus de Paoli	Ketel Weber, Amanda Plummer, Lou Castel	Science fiction	
Dreileben: Beats Being Dead	Christian Petzold	Jacob Matschenz, Luna Mijović, Vijessna Ferkic	Drama	
Dreileben: Don't Follow Me Around	Dominik Graf	Jeanette Hain, Susanne Wolff, Mišel Matičević, Lisa Kreuzer, Rüdiger Vogler	Drama	
Dreileben: One Minute of Darkness	Christoph Hochhäusler	Stefan Kurt, Eberhard Kirchberg	Drama	
Easter Goes Polish	Jakob Ziemnicki	Henry Hübchen, Grażyna Szapołowska	Comedy	a.k.a. Polnische Ostern
The Education	Dirk Lütter	Joseph Konrad Bundschuh	Drama	a.k.a. Die Ausbildung
Emancipation	Philipp Müller-Dorn	Urs Stämpfli	Drama	a.k.a. eMANNzipation
The End of a Mouse Is the Beginning of a Cat	Stefan Kornatz	Hilmi Sözer, Maren Eggert	Thriller	
The Family	Carlo Rola	Hardy Krüger, Dennenesch Zoudé, Karin Boyd, Gila von Weitershausen	Drama	a.k.a. Familiengeheimnisse – Liebe, Schuld und Tod
A Family of Three	Pia Strietmann	Götz Schubert, Max Riemelt, Mathilde Bundschuh, Lena Stolze	Drama	a.k.a. Tage, die bleiben
Farewell to the Frogs	Ulrich Schamoni, Ulrike Schamoni	Ulrich Schamoni	Documentary	
The Fire	Brigitte Maria Bertele	Maja Schöne, Florian David Fitz, Wotan Wilke Möhring, Mark Waschke	Drama	a.k.a. Der Brand
Fischer fischt Frau	Lars Jessen	Sanâa Alaoui, Peter Heinrich Brix, Bjarne Mädel, Anna Loos	Comedy	a.k.a. Fisherman Catches a Wife
Fortress	Kirsi Marie Liimatainen	Elisa Essig, Peter Lohmeyer, Ursina Lardi, Karoline Herfurth	Drama	
Free-running Men	Matthias Tiefenbacher	Wotan Wilke Möhring, Fritz Karl, Mark Waschke, Lisa Werlinder	Comedy	a.k.a. Freilaufende Männer
From Istanbul with Love	Berno Kürten	Jasmin Gerat, Tim Bergmann	Comedy	a.k.a. Liebeskuss am Bosporus
Für immer 30	Andi Niessner	Felix Eitner, Marie-Lou Sellem, Hanns Zischler, Sidonie von Krosigk, Jürgen Tarrach	Comedy	a.k.a. Für immer dreißig
Fugitives	Andreas Linke	Sergej Moya, Franz Dinda, Frederick Lau	Drama	a.k.a. Go West
Die geerbte Familie	Christine Kabisch	Denise Zich, Hendrik Duryn	Comedy	
Gegengerade	Tarek Ehlail	Mario Adorf, Denis Moschitto, Fabian Busch, Natalia Avelon	Drama, Sport	
Geister all inclusive	Axel Sand	Annette Frier, Kai Schumann, Erdogan Atalay, Tom Beck	Comedy, Fantasy	
The Girl at the Bottom of the Sea	Ben Verbong	Yvonne Catterfeld, Benjamin Sadler	Biography, Adventure	a.k.a. The Girl on the Ocean Floor
Das Glück ist ein Kaktus	Stephan Meyer	Christiane Hörbiger, Heidelinde Weis, Friedrich von Thun	Comedy	
God's Mighty Servant	Marcus O. Rosenmüller	Christine Neubauer, Remo Girone, Renato Scarpa, Tina Engel	Biography	a.k.a. Gottes mächtige Dienerin
The Gold Quest: A Journey to Panama	Sigi Rothemund	Julia Stinshoff, Oliver Bootz, Uwe Kockisch	Adventure	a.k.a. Ein Schatz fürs Leben – Abenteuer in Panama
The Good Neighbour	Stephan Rick	Maxim Mehmet, Charly Hübner	Thriller	a.k.a. Unter Nachbarn
A Good Summer	Edward Berger	Andreas Schmidt, Jördis Triebel, Devid Striesow	Comedy	
The Great Comeback	Tomy Wigand	Uwe Ochsenknecht, Andrea Sawatzki, Valerie Niehaus	Comedy, Music	
The Gruffalo's Child	Max Lang	—N/a	Animated film	British-German co-production
The Guantanamo Trap	Thomas Wallner		Documentary	Canadian-German-Swiss-French co-production
Eine halbe Ewigkeit	Matthias Tiefenbacher	Cornelia Froboess, Matthias Habich	Drama	
Hanna	Joe Wright	Saoirse Ronan, Cate Blanchett, Eric Bana	Action thriller	American-German-British co-production
Hannah Mangold & Lucy Palm	Florian Schwarz	Anja Kling, Britta Hammelstein, Jella Haase	Crime	a.k.a. Hannah Mangold und Lucy Palm
Harvest	Benjamin Cantu	Lukas Steltner, Kai Michael Müller	Drama	a.k.a. Stadt Land Fluss
Heavy Girls	Axel Ranisch	Heiko Pinkowski, Peter Trabner, Ruth Bickelhaupt	Comedy	
Hell	Tim Fehlbaum	Hannah Herzsprung, Stipe Erceg, Angela Winkler	Science fiction	
Hindenburg: The Last Flight	Philipp Kadelbach	Lauren Lee Smith, Stacy Keach, Greta Scacchi, Max Simonischek, Heiner Lauterbach, Hannes Jaenicke	Disaster	
Holger sacht nix	Thomas Durchschlag	Tilo Prückner	Comedy	
Homevideo	Kilian Riedhof	Jonas Nay, Jannik Schümann, Wotan Wilke Möhring	Drama	
Homies	Adnan G. Köse	Jimi Blue Ochsenknecht, Detlef Soost, Günther Kaufmann, Ann-Kathrin Kramer	Music	
Hopfensommer	Christian Wagner	Fritz Karl, Christina Hecke, Anna Schudt, Elmar Wepper, Gaby Dohm	Drama	
Hot Line	Markus Goller	Gisela Schneeberger, Bettina Mittendorfer, Rosalie Thomass, Monika Gruber	Comedy	a.k.a. Eine ganz heiße Nummer
Hotline	Josh Broecker	Ulrike Folkerts, Sophie Schütt, Stefan Murr	Comedy	a.k.a. Stadtgeflüster – Sex nach Fünf
Hotel Lux	Leander Haußmann	Michael Herbig, Jürgen Vogel	Comedy	
Hut in the Woods	Hans Weingartner	Peter Schneider	Drama	a.k.a. Die Summe meiner einzelnen Teile
I Never Told You	Johannes Fabrick	Barbara Auer, Roeland Wiesnekker	Drama	
I Phone You	Tang Dan	Jiang Yiyan, Florian Lukas	Romantic comedy	German-Chinese co-production
If Not Us, Who?	Andres Veiel	August Diehl, Lena Lauzemis, Alexander Fehling	Drama	
Implosion	Sören Voigt	Eye Haïdara, Sven Gielnik, Eriq Ebouaney	Drama	German-Spanish co-production
In Darkness	Agnieszka Holland	Robert Więckiewicz, Benno Fürmann, Agnieszka Grochowska, Maria Schrader, Herbert Knaup, Kinga Preis, Krzysztof Skonieczny	War	Polish-German-Canadian co-production
In the Prime of Life	Hartmut Schoen	Senta Berger, Burghart Klaußner, Ellen Schwiers	Drama	
In the World You Have Fear	Hans W. Geißendörfer	Anna Maria Mühe, Max von Thun, Axel Prahl	Drama	
Indisch für Anfänger	Sebastian Vigg	Wolke Hegenbarth, Henning Baum, Michael Lott	Adventure	
Inklusion – gemeinsam anders	Marc-Andreas Bochert	Florian Stetter, Paula Kroh, Max von der Groeben	Drama	
Eine Insel namens Udo	Markus Sehr	Kurt Krömer, Fritzi Haberlandt	Comedy	
Into the Abyss	Werner Herzog		Documentary	German-American-British co-production
The Invisible Girl	Dominik Graf	Ronald Zehrfeld, Ulrich Noethen, Elmar Wepper, Anja Schiffel, Silke Bodenbender	Crime	
Isenhart: The Hunt Is on for Your Soul	Hansjörg Thurn	Bert Tischendorf, Sebastian Ströbel, Emilia Schüle	Adventure, Mystery	
It's Not Over	Francis Meletzky	Anja Kling, Ulrich Noethen, Tobias Oertel, Melika Foroutan	Drama	a.k.a. Es ist nicht vorbei
Jasmin	Jan Fehse	Anne Schäfer, Wiebke Puls	Drama	
Jetzt sind wir dran	Heiko Schier	Jan-Gregor Kremp, Ingo Naujoks, Rebecca Immanuel, Ludger Pistor	Crime comedy	
Jonas	Robert Wilde	Christian Ulmen	Comedy	
Journey of Life	Wolf Gremm	Ruth Maria Kubitschek, Charles Brauer	Drama	a.k.a. Im Fluss des Lebens
Jungle Child	Roland Suso Richter	Stella Kunkat, Thomas Kretschmann, Nadja Uhl	Drama	
Kasimir and Karoline	Ben von Grafenstein	Christina Hecke, Golo Euler	Drama	
Kokowääh	Til Schweiger	Til Schweiger, Jasmin Gerat	Comedy	
Eine königliche Affäre	Wilfried Hauke	Nicki von Tempelhoff, Emily Cox, Max Mauff	Historical drama	
Konterrevolution – Der Kapp-Lüttwitz-Putsch 1920	Bernd Fischerauer	Hans-Michael Rehberg, Michael Roll, Eric P. Caspar, Holger Handtke, Marion Mitterhammer, Bibiana Beglau, Jürgen Tarrach, Johannes Zirner	Docudrama, History	a.k.a. Counter-Revolution
Kung Fu Mama	Simon X. Rost	Claudia Hiersche, Ben Braun, Alexander Radszun	Action	a.k.a. Nina Undercover – Agentin mit Kids
The Last Fine Day	Johannes Fabrick	Wotan Wilke Möhring, Julia Koschitz, Lavinia Wilson	Drama	
The Last Hope: U-Boat 864	Thorsten Näter	Yvonne Catterfeld, Stephan Luca, Max von Pufendorf, Rosemarie Fendel, Marie Zielcke	War	a.k.a. Am Ende die Hoffnung
Die Lehrerin	Tim Trageser	Anna Loos, Meret Becker, Axel Prahl, Julius Nitschkoff, Oskar Bökelmann	Drama	
Lenßen: The Movie	Andy Klein	Ingo Lenßen	Crime	
Lessons of a Dream	Sebastian Grobler	Daniel Brühl, Burghart Klaußner, Justus von Dohnányi	Sport	a.k.a. Der ganz große Traum
Lilly the Witch: The Journey to Mandolan	Harald Sicheritz	Alina Freund, Pilar Bardem, Anja Kling	Family	
Living Dangerously	John Delbridge	Rike Schmid, Hendrik Duryn	Drama	a.k.a. Zum Teufel mit David
Lollipop Monster	Ziska Riemann	Jella Haase, Sarah Horváth	Drama	
Looking for Simon	Jan Krüger	Corinna Harfouch, Nico Rogner, Mehdi Dehbi, Mireille Perrier	Drama	a.k.a. Auf der Suche. German-French co-production
Love Hurts	Rolf Silber	Annette Frier, Bernhard Schir, André Röhner	Comedy	a.k.a. Achtung Arzt!
Love Under Construction	Thomas Nennstiel	Christine Neubauer, Ulrich Noethen	Comedy	a.k.a. Lügen haben linke Hände
Das Mädchen aus dem Regenwald	Wolf Gremm	Christine Neubauer, Hardy Krüger Jr., Nirut Sirijanya	Drama	a.k.a. The Girl from the Rain Forest a.k.a. Magic Hour a.k.a. Wild
The Man from Beijing	Peter Keglevic	Suzanne von Borsody, Amy Cheng, Michael Nyqvist, Claudia Michelsen, Jimmy Taenaka	Thriller	a.k.a. The Chinese Man. German-Austrian-Swedish co-production
The Man with the Bassoon	Miguel Alexandre	David Rott, Christian Berkel, Ulrich Noethen, Valerie Niehaus, Herbert Knaup, Udo Jürgens	Biography	
Manipulation	Pascal Verdosci	Klaus Maria Brandauer, Sebastian Koch	Thriller	Swiss-German co-production
Der Mann auf dem Baum	Martin Gies	Jan Josef Liefers, Suzan Anbeh	Comedy	
Marco W. – 247 Tage im türkischen Gefängnis	Oliver Dommenget	Vladimir Burlakov, Veronica Ferres, Herbert Knaup, Erden Alkan, Şiir Eloğlu	Drama	
Masks	Andreas Marschall	Susen Ermich	Thriller, Horror	
Men Are Wired One Way, Women Another	Rolf Silber	Julia Koschitz, Tim Bergmann, Minh-Khai Phan-Thi	Comedy	a.k.a. Männer ticken, Frauen anders
Men in the City 2	Simon Verhoeven	Christian Ulmen, Nadja Uhl, Til Schweiger, Florian David Fitz, Justus von Dohnányi	Comedy	a.k.a. Männerherzen ... und die ganz ganz große Liebe
The Mine Sweeper	Marcus O. Rosenmüller	Christine Neubauer, Hannes Jaenicke, Heikko Deutschmann, Lukhanyo Bele, Tshamano Sebe	Drama	a.k.a. Die Minensucherin
The Moon Conspiracy	Thomas Frickel		Documentary	
Ein mörderisches Geschäft	Martin Eigler	Christiane Paul, Devid Striesow, Friedrich von Thun	Thriller	
Murder in the Best Family	Johannes Grieser	Katharina Böhm, Maja Maranow	Crime	a.k.a. Murder in the Finest Family a.k.a. Mord in bester Familie
My Life in Orange	Marcus H. Rosenmüller	Petra Schmidt-Schaller, Georg Friedrich, Oliver Korittke, Daniela Holtz, Brigitte Hobmeier	Comedy	a.k.a. Sommer in Orange
My Own Flesh and Blood	Vivian Naefe	Veronica Ferres, Kostja Ullmann, Sonja Gerhardt, August Zirner, Thomas Sarbacher	Drama	a.k.a. Mein eigen Fleisch und Blut
Never Again	Dror Zahavi	Dietmar Bär, Inka Friedrich	Drama	a.k.a. Kehrtwende
Night Without Morning	Andreas Kleinert	Götz George, Barbara Sukowa, Fritzi Haberlandt	Crime drama	
No Man Is an Island	Carlo Rola	Iris Berben, Henning Baum, Rolf Kanies, Stefanie Stappenbeck, Franziska Weisz	Drama	
No More Mr. Ice Guy	André Erkau	Herbert Knaup	Comedy	a.k.a. Arschkalt
No Sex Is No Option	Torsten Wacker	Stephan Luca, Marleen Lohse, Anna Thalbach, Armin Rohde, Corinna Harfouch	Comedy	
On the Inside	Uwe Janson	Sheri Hagen, Tyron Ricketts, Ken Duken	Thriller	
Papa allein zu Haus	Vivian Naefe	Götz George, Janina Stopper	Comedy	
Papa Gold	Tom Lass	Tom Lass, Peter Trabner	Drama	
The Path to the Past	Didi Danquart	Anna Stieblich, Martin Lüttge, Wolfram Koch	Drama	a.k.a. Bittere Kirschen
Pigeons on the Roof	Otto Alexander Jahrreiss	Katja Riemann, Olli Dittrich	Comedy	a.k.a. Die Relativitätstheorie der Liebe
Pina	Wim Wenders		Dance, Documentary	
Pixelschatten	Anil Jacob Kunnel	Ben Gageik, Zora Klostermann	Drama	
Playoff	Eran Riklis	Danny Huston, Amira Casar, Mark Waschke, Max Riemelt, Hanns Zischler	Drama, Sport	Israeli-German co-production
Plötzlich fett!	Holger Haase	Sebastian Ströbel, Diana Amft, Julian Weigend	Comedy, Fantasy	
Prime Time Crime	Franziska Meyer Price	Fritz Wepper, Bernd Michael Lade, Francis Fulton-Smith, Katharina Matz, Saskia Vester	Crime comedy	a.k.a. Lindburgs Fall
The Prize	Elke Hauck	Florian Panzner, Anne Kanis, Vanessa Krüger	Drama	
Princess Lillifee and the Little Unicorn	Ansgar Niebuhr, Hubert Weiland	—N/a	Animated film	
Promising the Moon	Hans Steinbichler	Hannelore Elsner, Juliane Köhler, Karoline Herfurth, David Kross	Drama	a.k.a. Das Blaue vom Himmel
Remember I'll Always Love You	Carlo Rola	Dennenesch Zoudé, Bart Johnson, Dean Norris, Karin Baal	Drama	
Remembrance	Anna Justice	Alice Dwyer, Mateusz Damięcki, Dagmar Manzel, David Rasche	Drama	a.k.a. Die verlorene Zeit
Rent Boys	Rosa von Praunheim		Documentary	a.k.a. Die Jungs vom Bahnhof Zoo
Rescue Dina Foxx!	Max Zeitler	Jessica Richter	Thriller	
Residual Risk	Urs Egger	Ulrike Folkerts, Kai Wiesinger, Matthias Koeberlin	Disaster	a.k.a. Restrisiko
Resturlaub	Gregor Schnitzler	Maximilian Brückner	Comedy	
The River Used to Be a Man	Jan Zabeil	Alexander Fehling	Drama	
Romeos	Sabine Bernardi	Rick Okon	Drama	
Rottmann schlägt zurück	Mark Schlichter	Heino Ferch, Meret Becker, Elyas M'Barek	Thriller	
Rough	Markus Busch	Birge Schade, Daniel Michel	Drama	a.k.a. Die Räuberin
The Sad Life of Gloria S.	Christine Groß, Ute Schall	Nina Kronjäger, Christine Groß	Comedy	
Die Schäferin	Dagmar Damek	Stefanie Stappenbeck, Michael König, Katja Studt, Hans Werner Meyer	Drama	
Schandmal – Der Tote im Berg	Thomas Berger	Max Riemelt, Katja Flint, Herbert Knaup	Crime	
Schief gewickelt	Lars Becker	Ken Duken, Cosma Shiva Hagen, Julie Engelbrecht, Uwe Ochsenknecht, Alexander Scheer	Comedy	
Schreie der Vergessenen	Lars Henning Jung	Vinzenz Kiefer, Alina Levshin, Manfred Zapatka, Barbara Meier	Horror	
The Secret of the Ark	Tobi Baumann	Stephan Luca, Julia Molkhou, Jean-Yves Berteloot, Michael Gwisdek, Hilmi Sözer, Friederike Kempter	Adventure	a.k.a. Visus – Expedition Arche Noah
The Seduction: The Strange Girl	Hannu Salonen	Christoph M. Ohrt, Bettina Zimmermann, Xenia Georgia Assenza, Sonja Gerhardt	Thriller	
Sex Sells!	Andi Niessner	Valerie Niehaus, Tom Beck	Comedy	a.k.a. Ausgerechnet Sex!
Shades of Happiness	Miguel Alexandre	Maria Furtwängler, Pasquale Aleardi, Dorka Gryllus, Rosel Zech, Günther Maria Halmer, Merab Ninidze, Michael Gwisdek	Drama, War	a.k.a. Schicksalsjahre
Shadows from the Past	Robert Dornhelm	Aglaia Szyszkowitz, André Hennicke, Mavie Hörbiger, Bernhard Schir	Thriller	a.k.a. Die Schatten, die dich holen. German-Austrian co-production
The Sleeping Girl	Rainer Kirberg	Natalie Krane, Jakob Diehl, Christoph Bach	Drama	
Sleeping Sickness	Ulrich Köhler	Jean-Christophe Folly, Pierre Bokma	Drama	
Someone Like Him	Anja Jacobs	Christian Ulmen, Lola Dockhorn, Lucas Reiber	Drama	a.k.a. Einer wie Bruno
Sommer der Gaukler	Marcus H. Rosenmüller	Max von Thun, Lisa Maria Potthoff	Biography	
Sommerlicht	Wolf Gremm	Ruth Maria Kubitschek, Sky du Mont, Florian Fitz, Elisabeth Wiedemann, Nadeshda Brennicke, Tina Ruland, Helmut Berger	Drama	a.k.a. Summer Light a.k.a. Facing the Light
Stankowski's Millions	Franziska Meyer Price	Wolfgang Stumph, Christian Tramitz, Jörg Schüttauf, Gerit Kling, Sky du Mont	Comedy	
Stilles Tal	Marcus O. Rosenmüller	Robert Atzorn, Wolfgang Stumph, Ulrike Krumbiegel, Victoria Trauttmansdorff, Tom Wlaschiha	Disaster	
Stopped on Track	Andreas Dresen	Milan Peschel, Steffi Kühnert	Drama	a.k.a. Halt auf freier Strecke
A Strange Family	Stefan Krohmer	Katja Riemann, Thomas Sarbacher, Fritz Schediwy, Katharina Nesytowa, Stephan Luca	Drama	a.k.a. Die fremde Familie
Suddenly Family	Felicitas Darschin	Leonard Lansink, Paul Faßnacht, Josefine Preuß, Charlotte Schwab, Peggy Lukac	Comedy	a.k.a. Im besten Alter
Summer Window	Hendrik Handloegten	Nina Hoss, Fritzi Haberlandt, Mark Waschke, Lars Eidinger	Drama	a.k.a. Fenster zum Sommer
Swans	Hugo Vieira da Silva	Kai Hillebrand, Ralph Herforth	Drama	
The System	Marc Bauder	Jacob Matschenz, Bernhard Schütz, Heinz Hoenig, Jenny Schily, Jürgen Holtz	Drama	
Tabu: The Soul Is a Stranger on Earth	Christoph Stark	Lars Eidinger, Peri Baumeister	Biography	German-Austrian-French-Luxembourgian co-production
Therese geht fremd	Berno Kürten	Christiane Hörbiger, Thomas Sarbacher, Ulrich Pleitgen	Drama	
The Three Musketeers	Paul W. S. Anderson	Milla Jovovich, Christoph Waltz, Mads Mikkelsen, Logan Lerman, Orlando Bloom, Til Schweiger	Adventure	German-French-British-American co-production
Three Quarter Moon	Christian Zübert	Elmar Wepper, Mercan Türkoğlu	Comedy	
Tod am Engelstein	Christiane Balthasar	Stefanie Stappenbeck, Nina Kronjäger	Mystery	
Tödlicher Rausch	Johannes Fabrick	Lisa Maria Potthoff, Fritz Karl, Olivia Pascal, Jürgen Tarrach	Drama	
Tom Sawyer	Hermine Huntgeburth	Louis Hofmann, Leon Seidel, Heike Makatsch, Benno Fürmann, Joachim Król, Peter Lohmeyer	Family	
Toni Costa	Michael Kreindl	Hardy Krüger Jr., Madita, Katja Woywood, Burkhard Driest, Siemen Rühaak	Crime	a.k.a. Der rote Regen
Die Tote im Moorwald	Hans Horn	Maria Simon, Franz Xaver Kroetz	Thriller	
Totem	Jessica Krummacher	Marina Frenk, Natja Brunckhorst	Drama	
Treasure Guards	Iain B. MacDonald	Anna Friel, Raoul Bova, Volker Bruch, Florentine Lahme	Adventure	
The Tuesday Ladies	Olaf Kreinsen	Ulrike Kriener, Saskia Vester, Nina Hoger, Inka Friedrich	Comedy	
UFO in Her Eyes	Xiaolu Guo	Shi Ke, Udo Kier	Science fiction	
Und dennoch lieben wir	Matthias Tiefenbacher	Claudia Michelsen, Melika Foroutan, Mark Waschke	Drama	
Unknown	Jaume Collet-Serra	Liam Neeson, Diane Kruger, January Jones, Aidan Quinn, Frank Langella, Bruno Ganz, Sebastian Koch	Action thriller	American-German-French-British co-production
Urban Explorer	Andy Fetscher	Klaus Stiglmeier, Nathalie Kelley, Nick Eversman, Max Riemelt, Catherine De Léan	Horror	a.k.a. The Depraved
Vanished	Andreas Prochaska	Emilia Schüle, Ann-Kathrin Kramer, Richy Müller, Julia Koschitz	Drama	a.k.a. Die letzte Spur – Alexandra, 17 Jahre a.k.a. Vermisst – Alexandra Walch, 17. German-Austrian co-production
Vater Mutter Mörder	Niki Stein	Heino Ferch, Silke Bodenbender, Merlin Rose, Liv Lisa Fries	Drama	
Der Verdacht	Matti Geschonneck	Christiane Paul, Hans-Jochen Wagner, Ina Weisse, Mina Tander, Pierre Besson	Thriller	
Verschollen am Kap	Andreas Senn	Heino Ferch, Barbara Auer, Nadja Bobyleva, Jesper Christensen, Tony Kgoroge, Stephan Kampwirth	Thriller	
Vicky and the Treasure of the Gods	Christian Ditter	Jonas Hämmerle, Waldemar Kobus, Günther Kaufmann	Family, Adventure	a.k.a. Wickie and the Treasure of the Gods
Vom Ende der Liebe	Till Endemann	Anja Kling, Bernhard Schir	Drama	
Von Mäusen und Lügen	Sibylle Tafel	Ulrich Noethen, Melika Foroutan, Heio von Stetten	Comedy	
Way Home	Andreas Kannengießer	Renate Krößner, Dieter Mann	Drama	a.k.a. Vergiss dein Ende
Weihnachten … ohne mich, mein Schatz!	Dennis Satin	Jutta Speidel, Henry Hübchen, Gesine Cukrowski	Comedy	
Westwind	Robert Thalheim	Friederike Becht, Luise Heyer, Franz Dinda, Volker Bruch	Comedy	
Der Wettbewerb	Michael Riebl	Harald Krassnitzer, Ann-Kathrin Kramer, Cornelius Obonya, Julia Cencig	Comedy	Austrian-German co-production
What a Man	Matthias Schweighöfer	Matthias Schweighöfer, Sibel Kekilli, Elyas M'Barek	Comedy	
When Santa Fell to Earth	Oliver Dieckmann	Alexander Scheer, Noah Kraus, Mercedes Jadea Diaz, Jessica Schwarz, Fritz Karl, Volker Lechtenbrink	Family	a.k.a. Als der Weihnachtsmann vom Himmel fiel
When the Foehn Wind Is Blowing	Rainer Kaufmann	Martin Feifel, Jürgen Tonkel, Katharina Marie Schubert	Crime comedy	a.k.a. Föhnlage
Wintertochter	Johannes Schmid	Nina Monka, Ursula Werner, Leon Seidel, Dominik Nowak, Julia Kaminska, Daniel Olbrychski	Road movie	a.k.a. Winter's Daughter. German-Polish co-production
Der Winzerkrieg	Peter Sämann	Uschi Glas, August Schmölzer	Comedy	a.k.a. The Winemaker War. German-Austrian co-production
Woman in Love	Detlev Buck	Matthias Schweighöfer, Alexandra Maria Lara, Detlev Buck, Denis Moschitto	Comedy	a.k.a. Rubbeldiekatz
World Express: Mystery of the Maya	Robert Del Maestro	Marco Girnth, Sarah Maria Besgen, Xenia Georgia Assenza, Jochen Nickel, Klaus J. Behrendt, Enoc Leaño, Tizoc Arroyo	Thriller, Adventure	a.k.a. World Express – Atemlos durch Mexiko
Wunderkinder	Marcus O. Rosenmüller	Elin Kolev, Imogen Burrell, Mathilda Adamik, Gudrun Landgrebe, Kai Wiesinger, Natalia Avelon, Catherine Flemming, Konstantin Wecker, Gedeon Burkhard	War	a.k.a. Child Prodigies
Years of Love	Matti Geschonneck	Iris Berben, Peter Simonischek, Nina Kunzendorf, Axel Milberg	Drama	a.k.a. Liebesjahre
You Don't Want to Know	Tim Trachte	Andreas Lust, Sophie von Kessel	Thriller	a.k.a. Davon willst du nichts wissen

== 2012 ==
Title	Director	Cast	Genre	Notes
Abseitsfalle	Stefan Hering	Bernadette Heerwagen, Sebastian Ströbel, Christoph Bach	Comedy	
The Adventures of Huck Finn	Hermine Huntgeburth	Leon Seidel, Jacky Ido, August Diehl	Family	
Alleingang	Hartmut Schoen	Armin Rohde, Alexander Held, Maria Schrader, Matthias Koeberlin	Thriller	
Annelie	Antej Farac	Georg Friedrich	Drama	Swiss-German co-production
Arabella Steinbacher - Sound of Hope	Dorothee Binding Benedict Mirow	Arabella Steinbacher	Documentary	German-Japanese co-production
Auf den zweiten Blick	Sheri Hagen	Anita Olatunji, Michael Klammer, Ingo Naujoks, Nele Rosetz, Pierre Sanoussi-Bliss, Milton Welsh	Drama	
Autumn Child	Petra Katharina Wagner	Katharina Wackernagel, Felix Klare, Heinz Hoenig, Saskia Vester, Lena Stolze	Drama	
A Year In The Life Of The St. Thomas Boys Choir Of Leipzig	Günter Atteln AttelnPaul Smaczny	Thomanerchor, Georg Christoph Biller, Gewandhausorchester Leipzig	Documentary, Music	German-Japanese co-production
Bankraub für Anfänger	Claudia Garde	Wolfgang Stumph, Edgar Selge, Steffi Kühnert	Crime comedy	a.k.a. Bad Bank
Barbara	Christian Petzold	Nina Hoss, Ronald Zehrfeld	Drama	
Baron on the Cannonball	Andreas Linke	Jan Josef Liefers, Jessica Schwarz, Katja Riemann	Adventure, Fantasy	a.k.a. Baron Munchausen a.k.a. Baron Münchhausen
Bissige Hunde	Alex Eslam	Tobias Oertel, Rick Okon, Jeanette Hain	Thriller	a.k.a. Vicious Dogs
Bliss	Doris Dörrie	Alba Rohrwacher, Vinzenz Kiefer, Matthias Brandt	Drama	a.k.a. Glück
Blonder als die Polizei erlaubt	Sophie Allet-Coche	Diana Amft, Maximilian Grill, Hannes Hellmann	Crime comedy	
Blood Eagle	Nils Willbrandt	Peter Lohmeyer	Thriller	
Breaking Horizons	Pola Beck	Aylin Tezel	Drama	a.k.a. Am Himmel der Tag
Breath of the Gods	Jan Schmidt-Garre		Documentary	a.k.a. Der atmende Gott
Cannibal Diner	Frank W. Montag	Alexandra Lesch	Horror	
The Case of Jakob von Metzler	Stephan Wagner	Robert Atzorn, Johannes Allmayer, Uwe Bohm, Hanns Zischler	Crime drama	a.k.a. The Jakob von Metzler Case
The Child	Zsolt Bács	Eric Roberts, Christian Traeumer, Sunny Mabrey, Ben Becker, Peter Greene, Reiner Schöne, Clemens Schick, Dieter Hallervorden	Thriller	
Clarissa's Secret	Xaver Schwarzenberger	Paula Kalenberg, Katja Riemann, Herbert Knaup, Fritz Karl, Friedrich von Thun	Drama	German-Austrian co-production
Closed Season	Franziska Schlotterer	Christian Friedel, Brigitte Hobmeier, Hans-Jochen Wagner	Drama, War	a.k.a. Ende der Schonzeit. German-Israeli co-production
Cloud Atlas	Tom Tykwer, The Wachowskis	Tom Hanks, Halle Berry, Hugh Grant, Hugo Weaving, Susan Sarandon	Science fiction	German-American co-production. Entered into the 37th Toronto International Film Festival, two awards at the Saturn Awards
A Coffee in Berlin	Jan-Ole Gerster	Tom Schilling, Friederike Kempter, Ulrich Noethen, Michael Gwisdek, Marc Hosemann, Justus von Dohnányi	Drama	a.k.a. Oh Boy
Dark Matter	Claudia Lehmann	Mark Waschke, Stipe Erceg, Bernadette Heerwagen	Drama	a.k.a. Schilf
The Dead and the Living	Barbara Albert	Anna Fischer, Itay Tiran, Daniela Sea, August Zirner, Winfried Glatzeder, Hanns Schuschnig	Drama	a.k.a. Die Lebenden. Austrian-German-Polish co-production
A Deal with Adele	Xaver Schwarzenberger	Birgit Minichmayr, Marianne Sägebrecht, Sunnyi Melles, Alicia von Rittberg, Paula Kalenberg, Florian Stetter	Biography, Crime	a.k.a. Die Verführerin Adele Spitzeder
Death of a Cop	Matti Geschonneck	Götz George, Jürgen Vogel, Rosalie Thomass	Crime	a.k.a. Death of a Police Woman
Deckname Luna	Ute Wieland	Anna Maria Mühe, Götz George, Heino Ferch	Thriller	
The Devil from Milan	Markus Welter	Regula Grauwiller, Ina Weisse, Max Simonischek, Elisabeth Trissenaar	Thriller	a.k.a. A Deal with the Devil. Swiss-German co-production
Doll, the Fatso & Me	Felix Stienz	Matthias Scheuring, Stéphanie Capetanidés, Tobi B.	Comedy	a.k.a. Doll, the Fatso and Me a.k.a. Puppe, Icke & der Dicke a.k.a. Puppe, Icke und der Dicke
Don't You Believe It!	Marcus H. Rosenmüller	Christian Ulmen, Fahri Yardım, Hannelore Elsner, Marie Leuenberger, Lisa Maria Potthoff	Comedy	a.k.a. St. Daisy a.k.a. Wer's glaubt wird selig
Doppelgängerin	Nikolai Müllerschön	Jutta Speidel, Heiner Lauterbach	Comedy	
Ein Drilling kommt selten allein	Dietmar Klein	Thekla Carola Wied, Günther Maria Halmer, Julia Brendler	Comedy	a.k.a. A Triplet Rarely Comes Alone a.k.a. Triplet Trouble
Dust on Our Hearts	Hanna Doose	Stephanie Stremler, Susanne Lothar	Drama	
Elli Strikes Out	Edzard Onneken	Michaela May	Comedy	a.k.a. Elli gibt den Löffel ab
Das Ende einer Nacht	Matti Geschonneck	Barbara Auer, Ina Weisse, Jörg Hartmann, Katharina Lorenz, Matthias Brandt, Melika Foroutan, Christoph M. Ohrt	Crime	
An Enemy to Die For	Peter Dalle	Tom Burke, Allan Corduner, Jeanette Hain, Sven Nordin, Axel Prahl, Richard Ulfsäter	Drama, Adventure, War	Swedish-German co-production
Errors of the Human Body	Eron Sheean	Michael Eklund, Karoline Herfurth	Drama	German-American co-production
Escape from Tibet	Maria Blumencron	Hannah Herzsprung, David Lee McInnis, Yangzom Brauen	Drama	Swiss-German co-production
Europas letzter Sommer	Bernd Fischerauer	Hubertus Hartmann, Eric P. Caspar, Lars Rudolph, Simon Hatzl, Gojko Mitić, Jürgen Tarrach, Julia Stemberger	Docudrama, History	a.k.a. The Last Summer of Europe
Famous Five	Mike Marzuk	Valeria Eisenbart, Neele Marie Nickel, Quirin Oettl, Justus Schlingensiepen, Armin Rohde, Anja Kling	Family	
Fliegen lernen	Christoph Schrewe	Gesine Cukrowski, Franz Dinda, Christoph M. Ohrt, Eva-Maria Hagen	Drama	
Flirtcamp	Oliver Dommenget	Kai Wiesinger, Stefanie Höner, Xaver Hutter, Laura Osswald, Mira Bartuschek	Comedy	
Fly Away	Bernd Böhlich	Otto Sander, Angelica Domröse, Ralf Wolter, Herbert Feuerstein	Comedy	a.k.a. Bis zum Horizont, dann links!
Foreign Deployment	Till Endemann	Max Riemelt, Hanno Koffler, Omar El-Saeidi, Devid Striesow, Bernadette Heerwagen	War	
Forgotten	Alex Schmidt	Mina Tander, Laura de Boer, Katharina Thalbach, Max Riemelt, Clemens Schick	Thriller	a.k.a. Du hast es versprochen
Formentera	Ann-Kristin Reyels	Sabine Timoteo, Thure Lindhardt, Vicky Krieps	Drama	
The Fourth State	Dennis Gansel	Moritz Bleibtreu	Thriller	a.k.a. Die vierte Macht
Fraktus	Lars Jessen	Studio Braun	Mockumentary, Music	
Freshly Squeezed	Christine Hartmann	Diana Amft, Tom Wlaschiha, Alexander Beyer	Comedy	
Friedrich – Ein deutscher König	Jan Peter	Katharina Thalbach, Anna Thalbach	Biography, History	
Full Contact - A Way of Living	Jakob Schäuffelen	Jakob Schäuffelen	Documentary, Sport	German-Japanese co-production
Das Geheimnis der Villa Sabrini	Marco Serafini	Simone Hanselmann, René Ifrah, Rufus Beck, Michael Mendl, Armin Rohde, Nadeshda Brennicke	Mystery	
Geisterfahrer	Lars Becker	Tobias Moretti, Fahri Yardım, Julia Dietze, Uwe Ochsenknecht, Armin Rohde, Sophie von Kessel, Mišel Matičević, Fritz Karl	Thriller	
The German Friend	Jeanine Meerapfel	Celeste Cid, Max Riemelt	Drama	a.k.a. My German Friend. Argentine-German co-production
Glory: A Tale of Mistaken Identities	Isabel Kleefeld	Senta Berger, Heino Ferch, Julia Koschitz, Stefan Kurt, Justus von Dohnányi	Drama	a.k.a. Fame
Guardians	Til Schweiger	Til Schweiger, Moritz Bleibtreu, Karoline Schuch, Heiner Lauterbach, Herbert Knaup	Action thriller	a.k.a. Schutzengel
Halbe Hundert	Matthias Tiefenbacher	Martina Gedeck, Leslie Malton, Johanna Gastdorf, Torben Liebrecht	Drama	a.k.a. Halbe 100
Eine Hand wäscht die andere	Hermine Huntgeburth	Ulrich Noethen, Alexander Scheer, Steffi Kühnert, Peter Lohmeyer, Waldemar Kobus	Comedy	
Hanna's Decision	Friedemann Fromm	Christine Neubauer, Edgar Selge, August Schmölzer, Sebastian Bezzel	Drama	
Hannah Arendt	Margarethe von Trotta	Barbara Sukowa	Biography	
Heiraten ist auch keine Lösung	Sibylle Tafel	Sonja Gerhardt, Kostja Ullmann, Saskia Vester, Katja Flint, Francesco Pannofino	Comedy	
Heiter bis Wolkig	Marco Petry	Max Riemelt, Elyas M'Barek, Jessica Schwarz, Anna Fischer	Comedy	a.k.a. Partly Sunny
Henryk from the Back Row	Andreas Dresen		Documentary	a.k.a. Herr Wichmann aus der dritten Reihe
Herzversagen	Dagmar Hirtz	Maria Simon, Charly Hübner	Crime	
Hives	Michael Lennox, Boaz Debby, Simon Dolensky, Igor Seregi, Tomáš Kratochvíl	Akbar Kurtha, Stefan Lampadius, Nili Tserruya, Luboš Veselý, Ozren Grabarić, Ljubomir Kerekeš	Anthology, Drama, Comedy	Croatian-German-Czech-English-Israeli co-production
Hochzeiten	Nikolai Müllerschön	Senta Berger, Friedrich von Thun, Lisa Martinek, Fritz Karl, Tim Bergmann	Comedy	a.k.a. To Have and to Hold
Das Hochzeitsvideo	Sönke Wortmann	Lisa Bitter, Marian Kindermann	Comedy	
Home for the Weekend	Hans-Christian Schmid	Lars Eidinger, Corinna Harfouch	Drama	a.k.a. Was bleibt
Homecoming	Jo Baier	August Zirner, Heike Makatsch, Herbert Knaup	Drama	a.k.a. The Return Home. German-Austrian co-production
The Hunt for the Amber Room	Florian Baxmeyer	Kai Wiesinger, Bettina Zimmermann, Fabian Busch	Adventure	
Idiotentest	Thomas Nennstiel	Mariele Millowitsch, Susanna Simon, Henriette Richter-Röhl	Comedy	
Inseln vor dem Wind	Dietmar Klein	Muriel Baumeister, Thure Riefenstein, Max Tidof	Adventure	a.k.a. Caribbean Gold
Into the Blue	Rudolf Thome	Vadim Glowna, Alice Dwyer, Stefan Rudolf, Elisabeth-Marie Leistikow, Janina Rudenska, Esther Zimmering	Drama	
Invasion	Dito Tsintsadze	Burghart Klaußner, Heike Trinker, Anna F., Merab Ninidze	Drama	German-Austrian co-production
Iron Sky	Timo Vuorensola	Udo Kier, Tilo Prückner, Götz Otto, Julia Dietze	Science fiction, Comedy	Finnish-German-Australian co-production
Jeder Tag zählt	Gabriela Zerhau	Lilian Prent, Katharina Böhm	Drama	
Jesus Loves Me	Florian David Fitz	Florian David Fitz, Jessica Schwarz, Henry Hübchen, Hannelore Elsner	Comedy, Fantasy	
Kaddish for a Friend	Leo Khasin	Neil Belakhdar, Ryszard Ronczewski	Drama	a.k.a. Kaddisch für einen Freund
Kennen Sie Ihren Liebhaber?	Michael Kreindl	Christine Neubauer, Hans Werner Meyer, Ulrich Noethen	Drama	
Kill Me	Emily Atef	Maria-Victoria Dragus, Roeland Wiesnekker	Crime	German-French-Swiss co-production
Das Kindermädchen	Carlo Rola	Jan Josef Liefers, Stefanie Stappenbeck, Matthias Habich, Natalia Wörner, Chulpan Khamatova	Thriller	a.k.a. The Nanny
Die Kirche bleibt im Dorf	Ulrike Grote	Natalia Wörner, Karoline Eichhorn, Julia Nachtmann	Comedy	
Der Klügere zieht aus	Christoph Schnee	Julia Richter, Matthias Koeberlin, Julia Koschitz, Simon Böer	Comedy	a.k.a. The Wise Man Moves Out
Kohlhaas oder die Verhältnismäßigkeit der Mittel	Aron Lehmann	Robert Gwisdek, Rosalie Thomass	Comedy	
Komm, schöner Tod	Friedemann Fromm	Herbert Knaup, Anna Loos, Leslie Malton, Dietrich Hollinderbäumer	Science fiction	a.k.a. Come, Gentle Death a.k.a. Die Erlöser AG
Konrad Adenauer – Stunden der Entscheidung	Stefan Schneider	Joachim Bißmeier	Biography, History	
The Last Ride	Christoph Schrewe	Heinz Baumann, Julia Jäger, Thomas Sarbacher, Sönke Möhring	Drama	a.k.a. Die letzte Fahrt
The Law of Silence	Florian Froschmayer	Ann-Kathrin Kramer, Kai Wiesinger, Pegah Ferydoni	Drama	a.k.a. Mit geradem Rücken
Leg ihn um – Ein Familienfest	Jan Georg Schütte	Hans-Michael Rehberg	Black comedy	
Life Is Not for Cowards	André Erkau	Wotan Wilke Möhring	Drama	a.k.a. Life's No Piece Of Cake
Listen to Your Heart	Karsten Wichniarz	Fritz Wepper, Gila von Weitershausen, Ernst Stankovski	Comedy	a.k.a. Alles außer Liebe
Little Murders	Adnan G. Köse	Paul Falk, Uwe Ochsenknecht, Ann-Kathrin Kramer, Jimi Blue Ochsenknecht, Günther Kaufmann, Jasmin Schwiers	Thriller	
Little Thirteen	Christian Klandt	Muriel Wimmer	Drama	
The Long Wave After the Keel	Nikolaus Leytner	Mario Adorf, Veronica Ferres, Christiane Hörbiger, Christoph Letkowski	Drama	German-Austrian co-production
Lore	Cate Shortland	Saskia Rosendahl	Drama	Australian-German-British co-production
Lost in Borneo	Ulli Baumann	Hannes Jaenicke, Mirjam Weichselbraun, Craig Fong	Adventure	
Lost in Siberia	Ralf Huettner	Joachim Król	Comedy	a.k.a. Ausgerechnet Sibirien. German-Russian co-production
A Low Life Mythology	Lior Shamriz	Nina Fog, Johannes Hendrik Langer	Drama	
The Lucky Plan	Kai Meyer-Ricks	Sebastian Ströbel, Petra Schmidt-Schaller	Comedy	a.k.a. Nein, Aus, Pfui! Ein Baby an der Leine
Ludwig II	Peter Sehr, Marie Noëlle	Sabin Tambrea, Sebastian Schipper, Hannah Herzsprung, Edgar Selge, Tom Schilling	Biography	German-Austrian co-production
Lullaby Ride	Christoph Schaub	Alexandra Maria Lara, Sebastian Blomberg, Georg Friedrich, Carol Schuler	Comedy	a.k.a. Nachtlärm. Swiss-German co-production
Mandy will ans Meer	Tim Trageser	Anna Loos, Hanna Müller	Drama	
Die Männer der Emden	Berengar Pfahl	Ken Duken, Felicitas Woll, Sebastian Blomberg, Sibel Kekilli, Oliver Korittke	War	a.k.a. Odyssey of Heroes
The Marriage Swindler and His Wife	Manfred Stelzer	Armin Rohde, Gisela Schneeberger, Detlev Buck, Nicolette Krebitz, Sunnyi Melles, Sky du Mont, Anna Thalbach, Nadeshda Brennicke	Crime comedy	
Measuring the World	Detlev Buck	Florian David Fitz, Albrecht Schuch	Biography	German-Austrian co-production
Mein verrücktes Jahr in Bangkok	Sigi Rothemund	Christine Neubauer, Bernhard Schir, Rhatha Phongam, Minh-Khai Phan-Thi	Comedy	
Meine Tochter, ihr Freund und ich	Walter Weber	Axel Milberg, Andrea Sawatzki, Anna Rot, Manuel Rubey	Comedy	German-Austrian co-production
Men Do What They Can	Marc Rothemund	Wotan Wilke Möhring, Jan Josef Liefers, Jasmin Gerat	Comedy	a.k.a. Mann tut was Mann kann
Mercy	Matthias Glasner	Jürgen Vogel, Birgit Minichmayr	Drama	
Milk Money	Rainer Kaufmann	Herbert Knaup, August Zirner, Tilo Prückner	Crime comedy	
The Million Dollar Race	Christoph Schnee	Axel Prahl, Peter Lohmeyer	Comedy	a.k.a. Das Millionen Rennen
Mittlere Reife	Martin Enlen	Bernadette Heerwagen, Herbert Knaup, Jannik Schümann, Sonja Gerhardt	Drama	
Mobbing	Nicole Weegmann	Susanne Wolff, Tobias Moretti	Drama	
Mom's Gotta Go	Edward Berger	Bastian Pastewka, Judy Winter, Rosalie Thomass	Black comedy	a.k.a. Go, Mom, Go! a.k.a. Mother Must Go
Moon Man	Stephan Schesch	—N/a	Animated film	French-German-Irish co-production
Mord in Ludwigslust	Kai Wessel	Anja Kling, Mark Waschke, Ina Weisse, Clemens Schick	Crime	
Move	Dietrich Brüggemann	Jacob Matschenz, Robert Gwisdek, Corinna Harfouch	Comedy	a.k.a. 3 Zimmer/Küche/Bad
Munich '72	Dror Zahavi	Heino Ferch, Bernadette Heerwagen	Docudrama	
My Beautiful Country	Michaela Kezele	Zrinka Cvitešić, Mišel Matičević	Drama	a.k.a. Die Brücke am Ibar
My Sister's Wedding Dress	Florian Froschmayer	Alissa Jung, David Rott, Pasquale Aleardi	Comedy	a.k.a. Im Brautkleid meiner Schwester
Nemez	Stanislav Güntner	Mark Filatov, Emilia Schüle, Àlex Brendemühl	Crime	
Obendrüber, da schneit es	Vivian Naefe	Diana Amft, Wotan Wilke Möhring, August Zirner, Gisela Schneeberger, Fred Stillkrauth	Comedy	a.k.a. It Is Snowing Up Here
Off-Line	Oliver Dommenget	Annette Frier, Jamie Bick, Johannes Brandrup	Thriller	a.k.a. Online: My Daughter in Danger
Offroad	Elmar Fischer	Nora Tschirner, Elyas M'Barek	Crime comedy	
Omamamia	Tomy Wigand	Marianne Sägebrecht, Giancarlo Giannini, Miriam Stein	Comedy	
Operation Sugar	Rainer Kaufmann	Senta Berger, Nadja Uhl	Thriller	a.k.a. Operation Zucker
The Other Wife	Giles Foster	Rupert Everett, Natalia Wörner, John Hannah	Drama	British-German co-production
Our Big Time	Wolfram Paulus	Lorenz Willkomm, Johannes Nussbaum, Udo Samel, Susanne Lothar	War	a.k.a. Blutsbrüder teilen alles. Austrian-German-Romanian co-production
Our Little Differences	Sylvie Michel	Wolfram Koch, Bettina Stucky	Drama	a.k.a. Die feinen Unterschiede
Out of Sight	Andreas Senn	Marie Zielcke, Kevin Fang, Fritz Karl	Thriller	a.k.a. Verfolgt – Der kleine Zeuge. German-Austrian co-production
Passions from the Past	Helmut Metzger	Stephan Luca, Raven Tao	Drama	a.k.a. Reunited in Malaysia
The Perjured Farmer	Joseph Vilsmaier	Günther Maria Halmer, Suzanne von Borsody, Max Tidof	Drama	a.k.a. The Farmer Forsworn a.k.a. Der Meineidbauer. German-Austrian co-production
Polluting Paradise	Fatih Akin		Documentary	a.k.a. Garbage in the Garden of Eden
Puppe	Sebastian Kutzli	Anke Retzlaff, Corinna Harfouch, Sara Fazilat, Jella Haase	Drama	a.k.a. Puppet. German-Swiss co-production
The Pursuit of Unhappiness	Sherry Hormann	Johanna Wokalek, Iris Berben	Comedy	a.k.a. The Situation Is Hopeless But Not Serious
Radio Silence	Marco J. Riedl, Carsten Vauth	Markus Knüfken, Charles Rettinghaus, Jasmin Lord	Horror thriller	a.k.a. On Air
Reality XL	Thomas Bohn	Heiner Lauterbach, Annika Blendl, Max Tidof, Godehard Giese	Science fiction	
Die Reichsgründung	Bernd Fischerauer	Torsten Münchow, Bibiana Beglau, Michael Mendl, Gudrun Landgrebe, Holger Handtke, Reiner Schöne	Docudrama, History	a.k.a. Birth of an Empire
Rendezvous in Malaysia	Helmut Metzger	Ursula Karven, Steve Yap, Carmen Soo, Patrick Teoh, Oliver Stritzel	Crime	a.k.a. Mein Herz in Malaysia
Reported Missing	Jan Speckenbach	André Hennicke	Science fiction	a.k.a. Die Vermissten
Resident Evil: Retribution	Paul W. S. Anderson	Milla Jovovich	Action, Horror	German-Canadian-American co-production
The Revenge of the Whore	Hansjörg Thurn	Alexandra Neldel, Bert Tischendorf, Götz Otto, Esther Schweins	Adventure	a.k.a. The Revenge of the Siren
The Rhino and the Dragonfly	Lola Randl	Mario Adorf, Fritzi Haberlandt	Comedy	
Risky Patients	Stefan Krohmer	Devid Striesow, Martin Feifel, Joanna Kitzl, Corinna Kirchhoff	Crime	
Robot Mom	Oliver Dommenget	Valerie Niehaus, Oliver Mommsen, Ludger Pistor	Science fiction, Comedy	a.k.a. Mich gibt's nur zweimal
Rommel	Niki Stein	Ulrich Tukur, Hanns Zischler, Thomas Thieme, Klaus J. Behrendt	War	
Room on the Broom	Max Lang, Jan Lachauer	—N/a	Animated film	British-German co-production
Russian Disco	Oliver Ziegenbalg	Matthias Schweighöfer	Comedy	a.k.a. Russendisko
Russisch Roulette	Joseph Vilsmaier	Katharina Böhm, Heinz Hoenig	Thriller	a.k.a. Russian Roulette
Schlaflos in Schwabing	Christine Kabisch	Mariele Millowitsch, Jan-Gregor Kremp, Johanna Gastdorf	Comedy	
Die Schuld der Erben	Uwe Janson	Lisa Martinek, Jürgen Prochnow, Otto Sander, Johann von Bülow, Gaby Dohm, Matthias Koeberlin	Drama	
Sechzehneichen	Hendrik Handloegten	Heike Makatsch, Mark Waschke, Sandra Borgmann, Stefanie Stappenbeck, Marc Hosemann, Alexander Beyer, Lavinia Wilson	Thriller	
Shifting the Blame	Lars-Gunnar Lotz	Edin Hasanović, Julia Brendler	Drama	a.k.a. Schuld sind immer die Anderen
Shores of Hope	Toke Constantin Hebbeln	Alexander Fehling, August Diehl, Ronald Zehrfeld, Rolf Hoppe, Sylvester Groth	Drama	a.k.a. Wir wollten aufs Meer
Silent Youth	Diemo Kemmesies	Martin Bruchmann, Josef Mattes	Drama	
Sin Reaper	Sebastian Bartolitius	Lance Henriksen, Helen Mutch	Horror	a.k.a. Sin Reaper 3D
A Small Thing	Florian Gärtner	Theresa Scholze, Tom Wlaschiha, Nina Kronjäger	Comedy	a.k.a. Mann kann, Frau erst recht
Some Like It Happy	Florian Gärtner	Julia Brendler, Stephan Luca, Heinz Hoenig	Comedy	
A Special Band	Florian Gärtner	Max von Thun, Katharina Wackernagel	Music, Comedy	
The Spinning Program	Katinka Feistl	Annette Frier, Pasquale Aleardi	Comedy	a.k.a. Schleuderprogramm
Sprinter – Haltlos in die Nacht	Petra Katharina Wagner	Jens Albinus, Claudia Michelsen	Thriller	
Stolen Ransom	Stephan Wagner	Mišel Matičević, Ulrike C. Tscharre	Crime	a.k.a. Lösegeld
Strangers and Lovers	Matthias Tiefenbacher	Lisa Wagner, André Szymanski, Thomas Thieme	Drama	a.k.a. Gestern waren wir Fremde
Summer Outside	Friederike Jehn	Maria-Victoria Dragus, Nicolette Krebitz, Wolfram Koch	Drama	Swiss-German co-production
Sun, Secrets and Salami	Dennis Satin	Jutta Speidel, Bruno Maccallini	Comedy	a.k.a. Wir haben gar kein Auto
Sushi in Suhl	Carsten Fiebeler	Uwe Steimle	Biography	
This Ain't California	Marten Persiel		Documentary	
Three Hours	Boris Kunz	Claudia Eisinger, Nicholas Reinke	Comedy	a.k.a. 3 Hours
The Tower	Christian Schwochow	Jan Josef Liefers, Claudia Michelsen, Nadja Uhl	Drama	
The Treasure Knights and the Secret of Melusina	Laura Schroeder	Anton Glas, Thierry Koob, Lana Welter, Tun Schon, Alexandra Neldel, Clemens Schick, Vicky Krieps	Family	a.k.a. Knight's Treasure. German-Luxembourgian co-production
Tsunami – Das Leben danach	Christine Hartmann	Veronica Ferres, Hans Werner Meyer	Drama	
Turkish for Beginners	Bora Dağtekin	Elyas M'Barek, Josefine Preuß	Comedy	
Two Lives	Georg Maas, Judith Kaufmann	Juliane Köhler, Liv Ullmann	Drama	German-Norwegian co-production
Überleben an der Wickelfront	Titus Selge	Uwe Ochsenknecht, Valerie Niehaus	Comedy	
Und alle haben geschwiegen	Dror Zahavi	Senta Berger, Matthias Habich, Alicia von Rittberg, Leonard Carow	Drama	
Und weg bist du	Jochen Alexander Freydank	Christoph Maria Herbst, Annette Frier	Comedy	
Urban Fighter	Mike Möller	Mike Möller, Mathis Landwehr	Action	a.k.a. Arena of the Street Fighter a.k.a. Street Gangs: Show No Mercy
Vampire Sisters	Wolfgang Groos	Marta Martin, Laura Roge, Christiane Paul, Stipe Erceg, Michael Kessler, Richy Müller	Family, Fantasy	
Vatertage – Opa über Nacht	Ingo Rasper	Sebastian Bezzel, Sarah Horváth, Heiner Lauterbach	Comedy	
Visitors	Constanze Knoche	Uwe Kockisch, Corinna Kirchhoff, Anjorka Strechel	Drama	
Ein vorbildliches Ehepaar	Ben Verbong	Uwe Ochsenknecht, Heino Ferch, Sophie von Kessel	Comedy	Remake of Un couple modèle (2001)
The Wall	Julian Pölsler	Martina Gedeck	Science fiction	Austrian-German co-production
Was weg is, is weg	Christian Lerch	Maximilian Brückner, Mathias Kellner, Florian Brückner	Comedy	
The Weekend	Nina Grosse	Sebastian Koch, Katja Riemann, Barbara Auer, Tobias Moretti, Robert Gwisdek	Drama	
When It's Hot, at Least It's Not Cold	Mark von Seydlitz	Christine Neubauer, Birge Schade, Gesine Cukrowski, Markus Knüfken	Comedy	
Whispers of the Desert	Jörg Grünler	Esther Schweins, Mido Hamada, Hannes Jaenicke	Drama	a.k.a. Die Wüstenärztin
Willkommen im Krieg	Oliver Schmitz	Constantin von Jascheroff, Wilson Gonzalez Ochsenknecht, Hannes Jaenicke	Comedy, War	
Woman's Lake	Zoltan Paul	Nele Rosetz, Lea Draeger, Therese Hämer, Constanze Wächter	Drama	a.k.a. Frauensee
The Wood Baroness	Marcus O. Rosenmüller	Christine Neubauer	Drama	German-Austrian co-production
A Year After Tomorrow	Aelrun Goette	Margarita Broich, Rainer Bock, Gloria Endres de Oliveira, Jannis Niewöhner, Isolda Dychauk	Drama	
Year of the Dragon	Torsten C. Fischer	Klaus J. Behrendt, Nina Liu, Karoline Eichhorn	Drama	
Yoko	Franziska Buch	Jamie Bick, Jessica Schwarz, Tobias Moretti, Justus von Dohnányi	Family, Fantasy	
Zappelphilipp	Connie Walther	Anton Wempner, Bibiana Beglau	Drama	
Zettl	Helmut Dietl	Michael "Bully" Herbig, Ulrich Tukur, Götz George, Senta Berger, Hanns Zischler, Karoline Herfurth, Dieter Hildebrandt, Harald Schmidt	Comedy	
Zum Kuckuck mit der Liebe	Hajo Gies	Bernadette Heerwagen, Rita Russek, Jan-Gregor Kremp, Rüdiger Vogler	Comedy	
Zwei übern Berg	Torsten C. Fischer	Günther Maria Halmer, Gisela Schneeberger, Rita Russek, Ulrich Noethen, Erwin Steinhauer	Comedy	

== 2013 ==
Title	Director	Cast	Genre	Notes
300 Words of German	Züli Aladağ	Christoph Maria Herbst, Pegah Ferydoni, Vedat Erincin	Comedy	
3096 Days	Sherry Hormann	Antonia Campbell-Hughes, Thure Lindhardt	Drama	
Achtung Polizei! – Alarm um 11 Uhr 11	Rolf Silber	Christoph Maria Herbst, Lisa Maria Potthoff, Sebastian Ströbel	Comedy	
Adieu Paris	Franziska Buch	Jessica Schwarz, Sandrine Bonnaire, Hans Werner Meyer, Gérard Jugnot	Drama	German-French co-production
Afghanistan: A Murderous Decision	Raymond Ley	Matthias Brandt, Axel Milberg, Vladimir Burlakov, Ludwig Trepte, Matthias Koeberlin	War	
Age of Uprising: The Legend of Michael Kohlhaas	Arnaud des Pallières	Mads Mikkelsen, Bruno Ganz, David Bennent, David Kross	Drama	French-German co-production
Die Akte Beethoven	Ralf Pleger, Hedwig Schmutte	Lars Eidinger	Biography, Docudrama, Music	
Alaska Johansson	Achim von Borries	Alina Levshin	Thriller	
Alles Chefsache!	Edzard Onneken	Günther Maria Halmer, Angela Roy, David Rott, Helmut Zierl	Comedy	
Alles Schwindel	Wolfgang Murnberger	Ursula Strauss, Benno Fürmann, Udo Samel, Bibiana Zeller, Johannes Silberschneider	Crime comedy	Austrian-German co-production
The Almost Perfect Man	Vanessa Jopp	Benno Fürmann, Louis Hofmann, Jördis Triebel	Comedy	
Among Enemies	Lars Becker	Nicholas Ofczarek, Fritz Karl, Melika Foroutan, Birgit Minichmayr, Merab Ninidze, Fahri Yardım	Crime	
Art Girls	Robert Bramkamp	Inga Busch, Peter Lohmeyer, Megan Gay, Jana Schulz	Science fiction	
Back on Track	Kilian Riedhof	Dieter Hallervorden	Drama, Sport	a.k.a. Sein letztes Rennen
Banklady	Christian Alvart	Nadeshda Brennicke	Crime	
The Beautiful Spy	Miguel Alexandre	Valerie Niehaus, Fritz Karl, Noah Huntley	Thriller, War	a.k.a. The Spy a.k.a. Die Spionin
Bela Kiss: Prologue	Lucien Förstner	Kristina Klebe, Rudolf Martin, Fabian Stumm, Janina Elkin	Horror	a.k.a. The Kiss of a Killer a.k.a. Natural Born Killer
Bella und der Feigenbaum	Michael Kreindl	Christine Neubauer, Oliver Stokowski, Lisa Brühlmann, Max Tidof, Marcus Mittermeier	Comedy	
Beste Freundinnen	Thomas Jauch	Lena Stolze, Ulrike Kriener	Drama	a.k.a. Bosom Friends
Bible of Blood	Kai Meyer-Ricks	Jasmin Lord, Esther Schweins, Kristina Dörfer, Sina Tkotsch, Paula Schramm	Horror	a.k.a. Blutsschwestern – jung, magisch, tödlich
Binge Drinking	Bodo Fürneisen	Markus Quentin, Lena Klenke, Aglaia Szyszkowitz	Drama	a.k.a. Drinking Games a.k.a. Komasaufen
Black Panther	Samuel Perriard	Lucy Wirth, Ole Jacobs	Drama	Swiss-German co-production
Blank	Nikolaus Leytner	Klaus Maria Brandauer, Martina Gedeck	Drama	a.k.a. Die Auslöschung. Austrian-German co-production
The Blind Spot	Daniel Harrich	Benno Fürmann, Nicolette Krebitz, Heiner Lauterbach	Drama	
The Book Thief	Brian Percival	Geoffrey Rush, Emily Watson, Sophie Nélisse, Heike Makatsch	Drama, War	a.k.a. Die Bücherdiebin. German-American co-production
Break Up Man	Matthias Schweighöfer	Matthias Schweighöfer, Milan Peschel, Catherine De Léan, Nadja Uhl, Heiner Lauterbach	Comedy	a.k.a. Schlussmacher
Broken Glass Park	Bettina Blümner	Jasna Fritzi Bauer, Ulrich Noethen	Drama	
Buddy	Michael Herbig	Michael Herbig, Alexander Fehling, Mina Tander	Comedy, Fantasy	
Crocodile	Urs Egger	Mario Adorf, Alwara Höfels, Dagmar Manzel, Michael Mendl	Comedy	
The Dad Test	Udo Witte	Pasquale Aleardi, Tanja Wedhorn	Comedy	a.k.a. Papa auf Probe
The Dam	Thomas Sieben	Friedrich Mücke, Liv Lisa Fries	Drama	a.k.a. Staudamm
Dampfnudelblues	Ed Herzog	Sebastian Bezzel, Simon Schwarz, Lisa Maria Potthoff, Eisi Gulp, Sigi Zimmerschied	Crime comedy	
Dearly Departed	Thomas Kronthaler	Lisa Maria Potthoff, Monika Baumgartner, Jürgen Tonkel, Sebastian Bezzel, Stephan Luca	Black comedy	a.k.a. Die Gruberin
Death at the Baltic Sea	Martin Enlen	Maria Simon, Matthias Koeberlin, Ina Weisse, Justus von Dohnányi, Bernadette Heerwagen, Jonas Nay	Crime	
The Devil's Violinist	Bernard Rose	David Garrett	Biography, Music	a.k.a. Der Teufelsgeiger
Dreamland	Petra Volpe	Luna Mijović, Ursina Lardi, Devid Striesow, Marisa Paredes, Stefan Kurt, André Jung, Bettina Stucky	Drama	Swiss-German co-production
Einfach die Wahrheit	Vivian Naefe	Katja Flint, Heiner Lauterbach, Hannes Jaenicke, Ursina Lardi, Paula Hartmann	Crime	
Else	Anna Martinetz	Korinna Krauss, Martin Butzke	Drama	a.k.a. Fräulein Else
The End of Lies	Marcus O. Rosenmüller	Katharina Böhm, Aglaia Szyszkowitz	Drama	German-Austrian co-production
Es ist alles in Ordnung	Nicole Weegmann	Silke Bodenbender, Mark Waschke, Sinje Irslinger	Drama	a.k.a. Everything Is Alright
Everyday Objects	Nicolas Wackerbarth	Anne Ratte-Polle, Emma Bading, Leonard Proxauf, Lou Castel	Drama	a.k.a. Halbschatten. German-French co-production
Exit Marrakech	Caroline Link	Ulrich Tukur, Samuel Schneider, Hafsia Herzi	Drama	
Fack ju Göhte	Bora Dağtekin	Elyas M'Barek, Karoline Herfurth, Katja Riemann, Uschi Glas, Jella Haase	Comedy	a.k.a. Suck Me Shakespeer
False Freedom	Bernd Fischerauer	Ken Duken, Julie Engelbrecht	Drama	a.k.a. Frei
Familie inklusive	Christine Kabisch	Uschi Glas, Michael König	Comedy	
Family Follies	Ulli Baumann	Christiane Paul, Sebastian Bezzel, Anna Maria Sturm, Friedrich von Thun, Gisela Schneeberger	Comedy	a.k.a. Familie Sonntag auf Abwegen
Finsterworld	Frauke Finsterwalder	Ronald Zehrfeld, Sandra Hüller, Corinna Harfouch	Comedy	
Five Years	Stefan Schaller	Sascha Alexander Geršak	Drama	a.k.a. 5 Jahre Leben
The Forbidden Girl	Till Hastreiter	Peter Gadiot, Jytte-Merle Böhrnsen, Klaus Tange, Jeanette Hain	Horror	
Die Frau, die sich traut	Marc Rensing	Steffi Kühnert	Drama	
Frau Ella	Markus Goller	Matthias Schweighöfer, Ruth Maria Kubitschek, August Diehl	Comedy	
Free Fall	Stephan Lacant	Hanno Koffler, Max Riemelt, Katharina Schüttler	Drama	
Gaming Instinct	Gregor Schnitzler	Michelle Barthel, Jannik Schümann, Maximilian Brückner, Richy Müller, Ulrike Folkerts, Sophie von Kessel	Drama	
George	Joachim A. Lang	Götz George, Muriel Baumeister, Martin Wuttke, Samuel Finzi, Hanns Zischler, Thomas Thieme	Biography	a.k.a. Heinrich George
Girl on a Bicycle	Jeremy Leven	Nora Tschirner, Vincenzo Amato, Louise Monot, Paddy Considine	Comedy	German-French co-production
The Girl with Nine Wigs	Marc Rothemund	Lisa Tomaschewsky	Drama	a.k.a. Heute bin ich blond
The Girl with the Indian Emerald	Michael Karen	Stephanie Stumph, Suzanne von Borsody, Omar El-Saeidi, Manit Joura, Madalsa Sharma, Anang Desai, Pankaj Tripathi	Drama	
Global Player	Hannes Stöhr	Walter Schultheiss, Christoph Bach, Inka Friedrich, Ulrike Folkerts	Comedy	
Gold	Thomas Arslan	Nina Hoss, Marko Mandić, Uwe Bohm, Lars Rudolph, Peter Kurth	Western	Entered into the 63rd Berlin International Film Festival
Guten Tag, Ramón	Jorge Ramírez Suárez	Kristyan Ferrer, Ingeborg Schöner	Drama	a.k.a. Good Day, Ramon. Mexican-German co-production
Grenzgang	Brigitte Maria Bertele	Lars Eidinger, Claudia Michelsen, Hanns Zischler	Drama	
Grossstadtklein	Tobias Wiemann	Jacob Matschenz, Klaas Heufer-Umlauf, Kostja Ullmann	Comedy	
Habib Rhapsody	Michael Baumann	Vedat Erincin, Thorsten Merten, Burak Yiğit, Klaus Manchen	Drama	a.k.a. Willkommen bei Habib
Hanna's Journey	Julia von Heinz	Karoline Schuch	Comedy	a.k.a. Love Israel
Hansel & Gretel: Witch Hunters	Tommy Wirkola	Jeremy Renner, Gemma Arterton, Famke Janssen, Peter Stormare	Fantasy, Action	a.k.a. Hansel and Gretel: Witch Hunters. American-German co-production
Harms	Nikolai Müllerschön	Heiner Lauterbach, Axel Prahl, André Hennicke, Friedrich von Thun, Helmuth Lohner	Crime	
Harry nervt	Bruno Grass	Günther Maria Halmer, Angela Roy, Susanna Simon, Claudia Eisinger	Comedy	
The Heiress	Ayşe Polat	Mina Özlem Sagdiç, Oktay Çağla	Drama	German-Turkish co-production
Heroes	Hansjörg Thurn	Christiane Paul, Christine Neubauer, Heiner Lauterbach, Hannes Jaenicke, Armin Rohde, Emilia Schüle, Jannis Niewöhner, Yvonne Catterfeld	Disaster	a.k.a. Helden – Wenn dein Land dich braucht
Home from Home	Edgar Reitz	Jan Dieter Schneider, Antonia Bill, Maximilian Scheidt, Marita Breuer	Drama	a.k.a. Die andere Heimat – Chronik einer Sehnsucht
The Hong Kong Affair	Peter Gersina	Veronica Ferres, Russell Wong, Herbert Knaup, Craig Fong, Matthew Marsh	Drama	a.k.a. Hafen der Düfte
Houston	Bastian Günther	Ulrich Tukur, Garret Dillahunt	Drama	
I Feel Like Disco	Axel Ranisch	Frithjof Gawenda, Heiko Pinkowski, Christina Große	Drama	
The Ice Queen	Christiane Balthasar	Iris Berben, Melika Foroutan, Florian Panzner	Thriller	a.k.a. Die Kronzeugin – Mord in den Bergen
Im Netz	Isabel Kleefeld	Caroline Peters, Felix Knopp, Wolfram Koch, Ulrike Krumbiegel	Thriller	a.k.a. In the Net a.k.a. Identity Thief
The Impossible Crime	Stephan Wagner	Ronald Zehrfeld, Florian Panzner, Ulrike C. Tscharre	Crime	a.k.a. Murder in Eberswalde
The Invention of Love	Lola Randl	Maria Kwiatkowsky, Sunnyi Melles, Bastian Trost, Mira Partecke, Marie Rosa Tietjen	Drama	German-Luxembourgian co-production
The Inventive Lady	Thomas Nennstiel	Simone Thomalla, Ulrich Noethen, Paula Schramm, Catherine Flemming	Comedy	a.k.a. Die Erfinderbraut
Das Jerusalem-Syndrom	Dror Zahavi	Jördis Triebel, Benjamin Sadler, Clemens Schick, Leonie Benesch	Thriller	a.k.a. The Jerusalem Syndrome
Der Kaktus	Franziska Buch	Peter Simonischek, Nadja Uhl, Heio von Stetten	Comedy	
Kaptn Oskar	Tom Lass	Tom Lass, Amelie Kiefer, Martina Schöne-Radunski	Drama	a.k.a. Captain Oskar
Die Kinder meiner Tochter	Karola Meeder	Jürgen Prochnow, Uğur Ekeroğlu, Mia Kasalo, René Ifrah	Drama	a.k.a. Suddenly Granddad
King Ordinary	David Dietl	Olli Dittrich, Veronica Ferres, Katrin Bauerfeind	Comedy	a.k.a. König von Deutschland
Das kleine Gespenst	Alain Gsponer	Jonas Holdenrieder, Uwe Ochsenknecht, Herbert Knaup, Sandra Borgmann, Stephan Kampwirth	Family	a.k.a. The Little Ghost. German-Swiss co-production
Kleine Schiffe	Matthias Steurer	Katja Riemann, Aylin Tezel, Hans Werner Meyer	Comedy	
Knocked Up	Wilhelm Engelhardt	Nadja Becker, Bert Tischendorf	Comedy	a.k.a. Drei in einem Bett
Kokowääh 2	Til Schweiger	Til Schweiger, Matthias Schweighöfer	Comedy	
The Last Mentsch	Pierre-Henri Salfati	Mario Adorf, Hannelore Elsner, Katharina Derr	Drama	German-Swiss-French co-production
Layla Fourie	Pia Marais	Rayna Campbell, August Diehl	Thriller	South African-German-Dutch-French co-production Entered into the 63rd Berlin International Film Festival
Das letzte Wort	Didi Danquart	Thomas Thieme, Shenja Lacher	Crime drama	
Live Is Life 2	Wolfgang Murnberger	Jan Josef Liefers, Joachim Fuchsberger, Dieter Hallervorden	Comedy, Music	a.k.a. Die Spätzünder 2 – Der Himmel soll warten. German-Austrian co-production
Lose Your Head	Stefan Westerwelle, Patrick Schuckmann	Fernando Tielve, Marko Mandić, Sesede Terziyan	Thriller	
Lost Place	Thorsten Klein	François Goeske, Josefine Preuß, Anatole Taubman	Horror	
Love Steaks	Jakob Lass	Franz Rogowski, Lana Cooper	Drama	
Lovely Louise	Bettina Oberli	Stanley Townsend, Annemarie Düringer, Stefan Kurt, Nina Proll	Comedy	Swiss-German co-production
Mantrailer – Spuren des Verbrechens	Alexander Dierbach	Liane Forestieri, Armin Rohde	Thriller	
Mein Mann, ein Mörder	Lancelot von Naso	Veronica Ferres, Ulrich Noethen, Mehdi Nebbou	Thriller	
Der Minister	Uwe Janson	Kai Schumann, Johann von Bülow, Katharina Thalbach, Alexandra Neldel, Thomas Heinze, Stefanie Stappenbeck	Comedy	
Mom Opts Out	Gloria Behrens	Rita Russek, Maren Kroymann, Eleonore Weisgerber, Walter Kreye	Comedy	a.k.a. Mutti steigt aus
More Than Friendship	Timmy Ehegötz	Michèle Fichtner, Jakob Graf, Holger Foest	Drama	
The Mortal Instruments: City of Bones	Harald Zwart	Lily Collins, Jamie Campbell Bower	Fantasy	American-German co-production
Mr. Morgan's Last Love	Sandra Nettelbeck	Michael Caine, Clémence Poésy, Gillian Anderson, Justin Kirk	Drama	French-German-Belgian-American co-production
Murder by Numbers	Thorsten Näter	Dagmar Manzel, Alwara Höfels, Felicitas Woll	Crime	
My Sisters	Lars Kraume	Jördis Triebel, Nina Kunzendorf, Lisa Hagmeister, Béatrice Dalle, Angela Winkler	Drama	
My Wife, My Boss	Matthias Steurer	Marie-Lou Sellem, Götz Schubert, Ulrich Pleitgen, Rolf Becker	Comedy	a.k.a. Als meine Frau mein Chef wurde
Night Over Berlin	Friedemann Fromm	Jan Josef Liefers, Anna Loos	Drama	
Night Train to Lisbon	Bille August	Jeremy Irons, Melanie Laurent, Jack Huston, Bruno Ganz, Christopher Lee, Charlotte Rampling, Lena Olin, Tom Courtenay, Martina Gedeck, August Diehl	Mystery drama	Portuguese-German-Swiss co-production
Nothing as It Was	Oliver Dommenget	Jonas Nay, Annette Frier, Götz Schubert, Bernadette Heerwagen, Thomas Sarbacher, Elisa Schlott	Crime	a.k.a. Nichts mehr wie vorher
Nothing Bad Can Happen	Katrin Gebbe	Julius Feldmeier, Sascha Alexander Geršak, Gro Swantje Kohlhof	Drama	a.k.a. Tore tanzt
On the Edge	Markus Imboden	Henry Hübchen, Martina Gedeck, Max Simonischek	Drama	a.k.a. Am Hang. Swiss-German co-production
Only with You	Udo Witte	Hardy Krüger Jr., Sophie Schütt, Katja Studt, Hanna Binke, Gila von Weitershausen, Charles Brauer	Drama	a.k.a. Nur mit euch
Open Desert	Robert Krause	Jennifer Ulrich, August Wittgenstein, Leon Ockenden	Adventure	a.k.a. Wüstenherz – Der Trip meines Lebens
The Other Child	Urs Egger	Marie Bäumer, Hannelore Hoger, Fritz Karl, Richard Johnson, Bronagh Gallagher, Raquel Cassidy, Hannah Steele, Carolyn Pickles, Lolita Chakrabarti, Emma Cunniffe, Matthew Marsh, Stuart Wolfenden	Thriller	
A Pact	Denis Dercourt	Mark Waschke, Marie Bäumer, Sylvester Groth, Sophie Rois, Saskia Rosendahl	Drama	a.k.a. Zum Geburtstag. French-German co-production
Parents	Robert Thalheim	Christiane Paul, Charly Hübner, Clara Lago	Comedy	
Party of Eight	John Kolya Reichart	Alexandra Finder, Natalia Rudziewicz, Andreas Bichler, Matthias Lier	Drama	a.k.a. Antons Fest
The Physician	Philipp Stölzl	Tom Payne, Ben Kingsley, Stellan Skarsgård, Emma Rigby, Olivier Martinez	Drama	a.k.a. Der Medicus
Pinocchio	Anna Justice	Mario Adorf, Ulrich Tukur, Florian Lukas, Sandra Hüller, Benjamin Sadler, Inka Friedrich	Family	
The Police Officer's Wife	Philip Gröning	Alexandra Finder, David Zimmerschied	Drama	a.k.a. The Policeman's Wife
Quality Time	Holger Haase	Florian David Fitz, Henry Hübchen	Comedy	a.k.a. Da geht noch was
A Quick Buck	Max Färberböck	Uwe Ochsenknecht, Sigi Zimmerschied	Comedy	a.k.a. Mein Vater, seine Freunde und das ganz schnelle Geld
The Revenants	Andreas Bolm	Dominic Stermann, Edda Bolm, Joachim Rüdig	Science fiction	a.k.a. Die Wiedergänger
Robin Hood	Martin Schreier	Ken Duken, Thomas Thieme, Dagny Dewath, Matthias Koeberlin, Stipe Erceg, Vinzenz Kiefer	Science fiction, Crime	
Robin Hood and I	Holger Haase	Pasquale Aleardi, Nadja Becker	Comedy, Fantasy	
A Royal Affair	Sven Bohse	Jennifer Ulrich, Pasquale Aleardi, Andrea Sawatzki, Mirjam Weichselbraun	Comedy	a.k.a. Herztöne
Ruby Red	Felix Fuchssteiner	Maria Ehrich, Jannis Niewöhner, Veronica Ferres, Katharina Thalbach, Gottfried John	Fantasy	
Run Boy Run	Pepe Danquart	Andrzej Tkacz, Kamil Tkacz	War	
Rush	Ron Howard	Chris Hemsworth, Daniel Brühl, Alexandra Maria Lara, Olivia Wilde	Biography, Sport	British-German-American co-production
Scale 6	Sabine Boss	Claudia Michelsen, Pasquale Aleardi	Thriller	a.k.a. Scale Six; German-Swiss co-production
Ein schmaler Grat	Daniel Harrich	Heiner Lauterbach, Felicitas Woll, Jürgen Prochnow	Thriller	
Shark Alarm at Müggel Lake	Leander Haußmann, Sven Regener	Uwe Dag Berlin, Henry Hübchen, Michael Gwisdek, Tom Schilling	Comedy	
Silent Sea	Juliane Fezer	Charlotte Munck, Alexander Beyer	Drama	a.k.a. Meeres Stille
Silent Summer	Nana Neul	Dagmar Manzel, Arthur Igual, Ernst Stötzner	Drama	
Silvi: Maybe Love	Nico Sommer	Lina Wendel	Drama	
Sisters	Anne Wild	Maria Schrader, Ursula Werner, Jesper Christensen	Drama	
Snow White Must Die	Manfred Stelzer	Tim Bergmann, Felicitas Woll	Crime	
Sommer in Rom	Stephan Meyer	Thomas Heinze, Esther Schweins, Mala Emde, Dietrich Mattausch	Comedy	
Sources of Life	Oskar Roehler	Jürgen Vogel, Moritz Bleibtreu, Meret Becker	Drama	
A Spicy Kraut	Buket Alakuş	İdil Üner	Comedy	a.k.a. Spiced Up Jack a.k.a. Einmal Hans mit scharfer Soße
The Stalker	Bernd Böhlich	Katarina Witt, Matthias Koeberlin, Valerie Niehaus	Thriller	a.k.a. Der Feind in meinem Leben
Stille	Xaver Schwarzenberger	Jan Fedder, Iris Berben, Florian Bartholomäi, Anna Fischer, Leslie Malton	Drama	German-Austrian co-production
The Strange Little Cat	Ramon Zürcher	Jenny Schily, Anjorka Strechel	Drama	a.k.a. Das merkwürdige Kätzchen
Striving for Freedom	Rainer Matsutani	Emilia Schüle, Nadja Uhl, Benno Fürmann, Gojko Mitić, Thomas Thieme, Jannis Niewöhner	Western	a.k.a. Wild Land a.k.a. In a Wild Country
Take Good Care of Him	Johannes Fabrick	Julia Koschitz, Barbara Auer, Filip Peeters	Drama	a.k.a. A Mother's Wish
Tarzan	Reinhard Klooss	—N/a	Animated film	
The Taste of Apple Seeds	Vivian Naefe	Hannah Herzsprung, Marie Bäumer, Florian Stetter, Meret Becker, Matthias Habich, Paula Beer	Drama	
Tod in den Bergen	Nils Willbrandt	Ursula Strauss, Robert Atzorn, Fritz Karl, Wolfram Berger, Felix Eitner, Andreas Lust, Jürgen Tonkel	Thriller	German-Austrian co-production
Tödliche Versuchung	Johannes Fabrick	Julia Koschitz, Vladimir Burlakov, Marcus Mittermeier	Thriller	a.k.a. Deadly Temptation
Der Tote im Eis	Niki Stein	Manfred Zapatka, Kai Wiesinger, Ulrich Tukur, Benjamin Sadler, Aglaia Szyszkowitz, Marie Rönnebeck, Maxim Mehmet	Drama	
Der Tote im Watt	Maris Pfeiffer	Petra Schmidt-Schaller, Thomas Thieme, Corinna Kirchhoff, Valerie Koch, Max von Pufendorf	Thriller	
The Tragedy of a Simple Man	Nuran David Calis	Tom Schilling, Nora von Waldstätten	Drama	a.k.a. Woyzeck
Tür an Tür	Matthias Steurer	Tanja Wedhorn, Thekla Carola Wied, Bernhard Schir, Uwe Friedrichsen	Comedy	
Turbo & Tacho	Heinz Dietz	Axel Stein, Daniel Roesner	Action comedy	a.k.a. Turbo und Tacho
Two Mothers	Anne Zohra Berrached	Karina Plachetka, Sabine Wolf	Drama	
Uferlos!	Rainer Kaufmann	Rolf Lassgård, Hannelore Hoger, Julia Brendler	Comedy	a.k.a. No Trespassing!
Ummah – Among Friends	Cüneyt Kaya	Frederick Lau, Kida Khodr Ramadan	Drama	
Unheil in den Bergen	Dirk Regel	Brigitte Hobmeier, Günther Maria Halmer, Tim Bergmann, Marcus Mittermeier	Drama	
Eine verhängnisvolle Nacht	Miguel Alexandre	Silke Bodenbender, Matthias Brandt, Ulrike C. Tscharre, Rolf Becker, Jella Haase	Thriller	
Vier sind einer zuviel	Torsten C. Fischer	Barbara Auer, Hannes Jaenicke, Matthias Brandt, Jan-Gregor Kremp	Comedy	(Shot in 2007)
Der Vollgasmann	Rainer Matsutani	Uwe Ochsenknecht, Anica Dobra, Jürgen Tarrach	Comedy	
The Wagner-Clan	Christiane Balthasar	Iris Berben, Lars Eidinger	Biography, Music	
Wagnerwahn	Ralf Pleger	Samuel Finzi, Pegah Ferydoni	Biography, Docudrama, Music	
Ein weites Herz	Thomas Berger	Nadja Uhl, Iris Berben, Friedrich von Thun, Peri Baumeister, Hinnerk Schönemann, Max von Thun	Drama, War	
Welcome to the Countryside!	Tim Trageser	Senta Berger, Günther Maria Halmer	Comedy	
Weniger ist mehr	Jan Ruzicka	Benno Fürmann, Ulrike C. Tscharre	Comedy	
Wenn es am schönsten ist	Johannes Fabrick	Heino Ferch, Max Hegewald, Julia Koschitz, Friedrich von Thun	Drama	
West	Christian Schwochow	Jördis Triebel, Alexander Scheer	Drama	
Wetlands	David Wnendt	Carla Juri, Christoph Letkowski, Marlen Kruse, Meret Becker	Drama	a.k.a. Feuchtgebiete
What the Sea Saw	Tim Trageser	Anna Loos, Karl Markovics, Jan Henrik Stahlberg, Wanja Mues, Michelle Barthel, Maren Kroymann	Thriller	a.k.a. Mord in den Dünen
When Inge Is Dancing	Wolfgang Groos	Paula Kalenberg, Tim Oliver Schultz, Tino Mewes, Peter Kraus	Comedy, Music	a.k.a. When She's Dancing a.k.a. Systemfehler – Wenn Inge tanzt
Where Friendship Ends	Stefan Krohmer	Heino Ferch, Matthias Brandt, Barbara Auer, Katja Riemann	Drama	a.k.a. Verratene Freunde
Whispers Behind the Wall	Grzegorz Muskala	Katharina Heyer, Vincent Redetzki	Thriller	a.k.a. To Die For a.k.a. Die Frau hinter der Wand
The White Horse Inn	Christian Theede	Diana Amft, Madita, Tobias Licht, Fritz Karl, Gregor Bloéb, Armin Rohde	Musical	a.k.a. Im weißen Rössl – Wehe Du singst! German-Austrian co-production
Wie Tag und Nacht	Sibylle Tafel	Thomas Sarbacher, Katharina Müller-Elmau, Vedat Erincin, Petra Kelling	Comedy	
Willkommen im Club	Oliver Schmitz	Lisa Martinek, Richy Müller, Sylvain Mabe, Alicia Borrachero, Joel Joan	Drama	
Windstorm	Katja von Garnier	Hanna Binke, Cornelia Froboess, Tilo Prückner	Family	a.k.a. Ostwind
Wolf Children	Rick Ostermann	Levin Liam, Helena Phil, Jördis Triebel	Drama	
The Woman from the Past	Andreas Kleinert	Ursina Lardi, Devid Striesow, Anna Loos, Jonas Nay	Drama	
A World Beyond	Heidi Kranz	Muriel Baumeister, Francis Fulton-Smith, Michael Mendl, Gottfried John, Nadeshda Brennicke, Sonja Kirchberger	Drama	a.k.a. Liebe und Tod auf Java
Zeugin der Toten	Thomas Berger	Anna Loos, Rainer Bock	Thriller	a.k.a. The Cleaner
Zur Sache, Macho!	Michael Rowitz	Max von Pufendorf, Mirjam Weichselbraun	Comedy, Fantasy	a.k.a. The Woman in Me. Austrian-German co-production
Zurich	Frederik Steiner	Liv Lisa Fries, Lena Stolze	Drama	a.k.a. Und morgen Mittag bin ich tot
Zurück ins Leben	Nikolaus Leytner	Christiane Hörbiger, Michael Mendl, Roman Knižka, Hans-Michael Rehberg	Drama	German-Austrian co-production

== 2014 ==
List of German films of 2014 (Cinema Releases in Chronological Order)

Title	Director	Cast	Genre	Notes
3/4	Maike Mia Höhne	Helene Grass, Stephan Szász	Drama	
About a Girl	Mark Monheim	Jasna Fritzi Bauer	Drama	
Affair of State	Michael Rowitz	Veronica Ferres, Philippe Caroit	Comedy	
Age of Cannibals	Johannes Naber	Devid Striesow, Sebastian Blomberg, Katharina Schüttler	Drama	
Agnieszka	Tomasz Emil Rudzik	Karolina Gorczyca	Drama	German-Polish co-production
Alles muss raus – Eine Familie rechnet ab	Dror Zahavi	Robert Atzorn, Lisa Martinek, Josefine Preuß, Florian Lukas, Armin Rohde	Drama	
Almuth und Rita	Nikolai Müllerschön	Senta Berger, Cornelia Froboess	Drama	
Amour Fou	Jessica Hausner	Christian Friedel, Birte Schnöink, Stephan Grossmann, Sandra Hüller	Biography	Austrian-German-Luxembourgian co-production
Anywhere Else	Ester Amrami	Neta Riskin, Golo Euler, Hana Laszlo, Hanna Rieber, Dov Reiser, Romi Aboulafia	Comedy	a.k.a. Anderswo
Asta Upset	Max Linz	Sarah Ralfs, Hannelore Hoger	Comedy	a.k.a. Ich will mich nicht künstlich aufregen
Autumn Tingles: Speed Dating for Silver Hairs	Jan Georg Schütte	Mario Adorf, Senta Berger, Angela Winkler, Matthias Habich	Comedy	a.k.a. Altersglühen – Speed Dating für Senioren
Backpack	Thorsten Wenning	Sebastian Urzendowsky, Henrike von Kuick	Adventure	
Be My Baby	Christina Schiewe	Carina Kühne	Drama	
Beloved Sisters	Dominik Graf	Hannah Herzsprung, Henriette Confurius, Florian Stetter, Ronald Zehrfeld, Anne Schäfer	Biography	
Beltracchi: The Art of Forgery	Arne Birkenstock	Wolfgang Beltracchi	Documentary	
Besondere Schwere der Schuld	Kaspar Heidelbach	Götz George, Hanno Koffler, Hannelore Elsner, Thomas Thieme, Manfred Zapatka, Anna Fischer	Crime	
Better Than Nothing	Ute Wieland	François Goeske, Jannis Niewöhner, Anna Fischer, Wotan Wilke Möhring, Nicolette Krebitz, Hannelore Elsner	Drama	a.k.a. Besser als Nix
Between Heaven and Here	Michael Karen	Yvonne Catterfeld, Sebastian Ströbel, Stuart Dunne, Lisa Kreuzer	Drama	
The Billionaire's Kiss	Nina Grosse	Claudia Michelsen, Michael Rotschopf	Drama	a.k.a. In der Falle
A Blind Hero: The Love of Otto Weidt	Kai Christiansen	Edgar Selge, Henriette Confurius, Uwe Bohm, Julia Goldberg, Fabian Busch	War	
Blood and Water	Christoph Stark	Florian Stetter, Marlene Morreis, Rosalie Thomass, Golo Euler, Sigi Zimmerschied	Drama	a.k.a. The Woman Out of the Marshland a.k.a. Die Frau aus dem Moor
Bright Night	Florian Gottschick	Benno Fürmann, Anna Grisebach, Vladimir Burlakov, Kai Ivo Baulitz	Drama	a.k.a. Nachthelle
Bunker of the Dead	Matthias Olof Eich	Patrick Jahns, Andreas Pape	Horror	
Burning Souls	Urs Egger	Mark Waschke, Silke Bodenbender, Paulus Manker, Axel Milberg, Richy Müller	Drama	a.k.a. Die Seelen im Feuer. German-Austrian co-production
The Chambermaid Lynn	Ingo Haeb	Vicky Krieps, Lena Lauzemis	Drama	
The Chosen Ones	Christoph Röhl	Ulrich Tukur, Julia Jentsch, Leon Seidel	Drama	
Citizenfour	Laura Poitras	Edward Snowden	Documentary	American-German co-production
Clara Immerwahr	Harald Sicheritz	Katharina Schüttler, Maximilian Brückner, August Zirner, Peter Simonischek	Biography	German-Austrian co-production
Coming In	Marco Kreuzpaintner	Kostja Ullmann, Aylin Tezel	Comedy	
The Council of Birds	Timm Kröger	Thorsten Wien	Drama	a.k.a. Zerrumpelt Herz
The Cut	Fatih Akin	Tahar Rahim	Drama	German-French-Italian-Polish-Russian-Turkish co-production
The Dark Valley	Andreas Prochaska	Sam Riley, Tobias Moretti, Paula Beer	Drama	a.k.a. Das finstere Tal. Austrian-German co-production
Daughters	Maria Speth	Corinna Kirchhoff, Kathleen Morgeneyer	Drama	
Death in Brittany	Matthias Tiefenbacher	Pasquale Aleardi	Crime	a.k.a. Inspector Dupin: Brittany Calling
The Decent One	Vanessa Lapa	Tobias Moretti, Sophie Rois	Docudrama	a.k.a. Der Anständige. German-Austrian-Israeli co-production
Dina Foxx: Deadly Contact	Max Zeitler	Katharina Schlothauer	Thriller	
Diplomacy	Volker Schlöndorff	André Dussollier, Niels Arestrup	Drama, War	French-German co-production
Divine Sparks	Maria von Heland	Jeanette Hain, Devid Striesow, Anna Maria Mühe, Barry Atsma	Drama	
Dr. Gressmann zeigt Gefühle	Niki Stein	Ken Duken, Alwara Höfels	Comedy	
Dyslexie	Marc-Andreas Bochert	Christoph Bach	Drama	a.k.a. Dyslexia
Elly Beinhorn: Solo Flight	Christine Hartmann	Vicky Krieps, Max Riemelt, Christian Berkel	Biography	
Everything Is Love	Markus Goller	Nora Tschirner, Heike Makatsch, Christian Ulmen, Wotan Wilke Möhring, Elmar Wepper	Comedy	
Die Fahnderin	Züli Aladağ	Katja Riemann	Thriller	
A Faithful Husband	Hermine Huntgeburth	Matthias Brandt, Suzanne von Borsody, Claudia Michelsen, Peri Baumeister	Drama	a.k.a. Männertreu
Der Fall Bruckner	Urs Egger	Corinna Harfouch, Christiane Paul	Drama	
False Conviction: The Case of Harry Wörz	Till Endemann	Rüdiger Klink, Felix Klare, Stefanie Stappenbeck	Docudrama	
Family Fever	Nico Sommer	Kathrin Waligura, Jörg Witte, Peter Trabner, Deborah Kaufmann	Comedy	
Farewell Herr Schwarz	Yael Reuveny		Documentary	a.k.a. Schnee von Gestern. Winner of the DEFA prize at Dok Leipzig
Die Fischerin	Jan Ruzicka	Alwara Höfels, Golo Euler, Max von Thun, Rüdiger Vogler	Drama	
Flights of Fancy	Christian Bach	Tobias Moretti, Jonas Nay, Hanna Plaß	Drama	a.k.a. Hirngespinster
For Nothing	Stephan Geene	Ceci Chuh, Seyneb Saleh	Drama	a.k.a. Umsonst
Frauen verstehen	Jörg Grünler	Senta Berger, Henry Hübchen, Michael Roll	Comedy	
Friendship on Hold	Peter Gersina	Mariele Millowitsch, Johanna Gastdorf, Christoph M. Ohrt, Ingo Naujoks	Comedy	a.k.a. Zwei mitten im Leben
Für immer ein Mörder – Der Fall Ritter	Johannes Grieser	Hinnerk Schönemann, Teresa Weißbach	Crime	
Futuro Beach	Karim Aïnouz	Wagner Moura, Clemens Schick, Jesuíta Barbosa	Drama	Brazilian-German co-production
Frauenherzen	Sophie Allet-Coche	Nadeshda Brennicke, Valerie Niehaus, Anna Fischer	Comedy	a.k.a. Heart and Soul
Glückskind	Michael Verhoeven	Herbert Knaup	Drama	
A Godsend	Oliver Haffner	Katharina Marie Schubert, Adam Bousdoukos	Comedy	a.k.a. A Gift from the Gods
Head Full of Honey	Til Schweiger	Dieter Hallervorden, Til Schweiger	Drama	
High Tide Is Dead on Time	Thomas Berger	Ina Weisse, Jürgen Vogel, August Zirner, Bernadette Heerwagen	Drama	a.k.a. The Tide Is Punctual
A Hitman's Solitude Before the Shot	Florian Mischa Böder	Benno Fürmann, Mavie Hörbiger	Crime comedy	
Die Hochzeit meiner Schwester	Marco Serafini	Chiara Schoras, Konstantin Wecker, Henrike von Kuick, Sebastian Ströbel, Olivia Pascal, Despina Pajanou	Comedy	
The Homecoming	Olaf Kreinsen	Alessandro Preziosi, Tanja Wedhorn, Peppino Mazzotta	Comedy	German-Italian co-production
The Hotel Room	Rudi Gaul	Mina Tander, Godehard Giese	Drama	
A House in Berlin	Cynthia Beatt	Susan Vidler, Clemens Schick, Stuart McQuarrie, Isi Metzstein, Doris Egbring-Kahn, Angela Schanelec	Drama	British-German co-production
In gefährlicher Nähe	Johannes Grieser	Julia Koschitz, Matthias Koeberlin, Michael Mendl, Johanna Klante	Thriller	
Inbetween Worlds	Feo Aladag	Ronald Zehrfeld	Drama	Entered into the 64th Berlin International Film Festival
The Ingredients of Love	Gregor Schnitzler	Melika Foroutan, Benjamin Sadler, Armin Rohde	Comedy	a.k.a. Das Lächeln der Frauen
Iron Fist	Carlo Rola	Henning Baum, Natalia Wörner, Dennenesch Zoudé	Adventure	a.k.a. Goetz von Berlichingen
Jack	Edward Berger	Ivo Pietzcker	Drama	Entered into the 64th Berlin International Film Festival
Joy of Fatherhood	Matthias Schweighöfer	Matthias Schweighöfer, Isabell Polak, Friedrich Mücke, Tom Beck	Comedy	
Kafka's The Burrow	Jochen Alexander Freydank	Axel Prahl, Kristina Klebe, Josef Hader, Devid Striesow, Robert Stadlober, Roeland Wiesnekker	Drama	a.k.a. The Burrow
The King's Surrender	Philipp Leinemann	Ronald Zehrfeld, Mišel Matičević	Drama	a.k.a. Wir waren Könige
Der Kuckuck und der Esel	Andreas Arnstedt	Thilo Prothmann, Jan Henrik Stahlberg, Joost Siedhoff	Comedy	a.k.a. The Cuckoo and the Donkey
Kückückskind	Christoph Schnee	Adnan Maral, Natalia Wörner	Comedy	a.k.a. Switched at Birth
Labyrinth of Lies	Giulio Ricciarelli	Alexander Fehling, Gert Voss, Friederike Becht	Historical drama	a.k.a. Im Labyrinth des Schweigens
Lamento	Jöns Jönsson	Gunilla Röör	Drama	
The Legend of the Mask	Florian Froschmayer	Claudia Michelsen, Gerardo Taracena, Mario Zaragoza, Dalia Hernández	Adventure	
Let's Go!	Michael Verhoeven	Alice Dwyer, Maxim Mehmet, Katharina Nesytowa, Naomi Krauss	Drama	
Letters from Santiago	Peter Gersina	Nilam Farooq, Christine Neubauer, Bastián Bodenhöfer, Alejandro Goic, Max Corvalán, Julio Jung, Bélgica Castro, Sergio Hernández	Drama	a.k.a. Die Briefe meiner Mutter
Die letzten Millionen	Udo Witte	Ursula Karusseit, Jutta Wachowiak, Dieter Mann, Michael Gwisdek, Ulrich Pleitgen	Comedy	
Die Lichtenbergs – zwei Brüder, drei Frauen und jede Menge Zoff	Matthias Tiefenbacher	Axel Prahl, Anja Kling, Armin Rohde, Susanna Simon, Tanja Wedhorn, Manfred Zapatka	Comedy	
The Lies of the Victors	Christoph Hochhäusler	Florian David Fitz, Lilith Stangenberg	Thriller	
The Lies You Sleep With	Thomas Roth	Nicolette Krebitz, Silke Bodenbender, Franziska Weisz, Madita, Nora von Waldstätten	Thriller	a.k.a. Blutsschwestern a.k.a. Die Tote in der Berghütte. German-Austrian co-production
A Life For Football	Hans Steinbichler	Josef Bierbichler, Jeanette Hain, Herbert Knaup, Eisi Gulp	Biography, Sport	a.k.a. Landauer – Der Präsident a.k.a. Kurt Landauer
The Limits of Patience	Christian Wagner	Martina Gedeck	Drama	a.k.a. Das Ende der Geduld
Lose My Self	Jan Schomburg	Maria Schrader, Johannes Krisch, Ronald Zehrfeld, Sandra Hüller	Drama	a.k.a. Vergiss mein Ich
Love Me!	Philipp Eichholtz	Lilli Meinhardt, Christian Ehrich	Drama	
Love, Rosie	Christian Ditter	Lily Collins, Sam Claflin	Romance	a.k.a. Where Rainbows End. British-German co-production
Lügen und andere Wahrheiten	Vanessa Jopp	Jeanette Hain, Meret Becker, Florian David Fitz, Thomas Heinze	Comedy	
Madame Nobel	Urs Egger	Birgit Minichmayr, Sebastian Koch	Biography	a.k.a. Eine Liebe für den Frieden – Bertha von Suttner und Alfred Nobel. Austrian-German co-production
The Man Cave	Franziska Meyer Price	Elyas M'Barek, Christoph Maria Herbst, Detlev Buck	Comedy	a.k.a. Männerhort
The Man with a Load of Mischief	Edzard Onneken	Fritz Karl, Julia Brendler, Götz Schubert, Katharina Thalbach	Mystery	German-Austrian co-production
Maya the Bee	Alexs Stadermann	—N/a	Animated film	German-Australian co-production
Meet Me in Montenegro	Alex Holdridge, Linnea Saasen	Alex Holdridge, Linnea Saasen, Rupert Friend, Jennifer Ulrich	Comedy	American-German-Norwegian co-production
Mein Lover, sein Vater und ich!	Holger Haase	Katharina Müller-Elmau	Comedy	
Meine Frau, ihr Traummann und ich	Walter Weber	Axel Milberg, Ulrike Kriener, Hendrik Duryn, August Zirner	Comedy	a.k.a. The Man of My Wife's Dreams
The Midwife	Hannu Salonen	Josefine Preuß, Axel Milberg, Andreas Pietschmann, Alicia von Rittberg, Lisa Maria Potthoff	Drama	
Miss Sixty	Sigrid Hoerner	Iris Berben, Edgar Selge	Comedy	
The Missing Gray	Nadine Heinze, Marc Dietschreit	Sina Ebell	Drama	
Mit Burnout durch den Wald	Michael Rowitz	Jutta Speidel, Stefanie Stappenbeck, Paula Kalenberg, Max von Pufendorf, Walter Kreye, Martin Brambach, Birge Schade	Comedy	
Momentversagen	Friedemann Fromm	Felix Klare, Lisa Wagner, Julia Thurnau, Lili Zahavi	Drama	
The Mommy Mafia	Tomy Wigand	Annette Frier	Comedy	
Monsoon Baby	Andreas Kleinert	Julia Jentsch, Robert Kuchenbuch, Tillotama Shome, Swaroopa Ghosh, Loni von Friedl	Drama	
A Most Wanted Man	Anton Corbijn	Philip Seymour Hoffman, Rachel McAdams, Willem Dafoe, Robin Wright, Daniel Brühl, Nina Hoss	Thriller	British-American-German co-production
Murder in the Cave	Maris Pfeiffer	Katharina Wackernagel, Vincent Redetzki, Aglaia Szyszkowitz, Eva Mattes, Barnaby Metschurat	Thriller	a.k.a. Mord am Höllengrund
My Brother's Keeper	Maximilian Leo	Sebastian Zimmler, Nadja Bobyleva, Robert Finster	Drama	
My Whole Half Life	Michael Karen	Julia Richter, Roman Knižka, Thure Riefenstein	Drama	
Nena	Saskia Diesing	Abbey Hoes, Uwe Ochsenknecht	Drama	Dutch-German co-production
Neufeld, mitkommen!	Tim Trageser	Ludwig Skuras, Christina Große, Tina Engel	Drama	
Nie mehr wie immer	Petra Katharina Wagner	Franziska Walser, Edgar Selge	Thriller	
No Escape	Andreas Senn	Anja Kling, Ruby O. Fee, Benno Fürmann	Thriller	a.k.a. Kein Entkommen
Not for Cowards	Michael Rowitz	Hannelore Hoger, Frederick Lau, Anna Brüggemann, Tino Mewes	Drama	
Not My Day	Peter Thorwarth	Moritz Bleibtreu, Axel Stein	Comedy	
Nowitzki. The Perfect Shot	Sebastian Dehnhardt	Dirk Nowitzki	Documentary, Sport	
Of Girls and Horses	Monika Treut	Ceci Chuh, Alissa Wilms	Drama	
One Like Her	Franziska Buch	Cornelia Gröschel, Marlon Kittel, Florian Stetter, Peter Heinrich Brix, Steffi Kühnert	Drama	a.k.a. One of a Kind a.k.a. Eine wie diese
Open the Wall	Christian Schwochow	Charly Hübner	Historical drama	a.k.a. Bornholmer Straße
Patong Girl	Susanna Salonen	Max Mauff, Aisawanya Areyawattana	Romance	German-Thai co-production
Pettson & Findus: Fun Stuff	Ali Samadi Ahadi	Ulrich Noethen, Marianne Sägebrecht	Family	a.k.a. Pettson and Findus: A Little Nuisance, a Great Friendship a.k.a. Petterson and Findus: A Small Nuisance, a Great Friendship. German-Swedish co-production
Phoenix	Christian Petzold	Nina Hoss, Ronald Zehrfeld, Nina Kunzendorf	Drama	
Pierrot Lunaire	Bruce LaBruce	Susanne Sachsse	Musical, Drama	Adaptation of Arnold Schoenberg's Pierrot Lunaire
Die Pilgerin	Philipp Kadelbach	Josefine Preuß	Drama	
Playing Doctor	Marco Petry	Merlin Rose, Ella-Maria Gollmer, Lisa Vicari, Jannis Niewöhner, Max von der Groeben	Comedy	a.k.a. Doktorspiele
Pompeii	Paul W. S. Anderson	Kit Harington, Emily Browning, Carrie-Anne Moss, Kiefer Sutherland	Disaster	Canadian-German-American co-production
Posthumous	Lulu Wang	Brit Marling, Jack Huston	Comedy	American-German co-production
Der Prediger	Thomas Berger	Devid Striesow, Lars Eidinger	Drama	
The Presence	Daniele Grieco	Liv Lisa Fries	Horror	
The Promotion	Zoltan Paul	Tilo Nest, Charly Hübner	Drama	a.k.a. Amok
Public Enemies	Roland Suso Richter	Sebastian Rudolph, Francis Fulton-Smith	Historical drama	a.k.a. The Spiegel Affair
Ein Reihenhaus steht selten allein	Titus Selge	Stephan Luca, Ulrike C. Tscharre, Felicitas Woll	Comedy	a.k.a. Trouble in the Neighbourhood
Rough Road Ahead	Christian Frosch	Victoria Schulz, Anton Spieker, Ben Becker	Drama	a.k.a. Von jetzt an kein Zurück. German-Austrian co-production
Der Rücktritt	Thomas Schadt	Kai Wiesinger, Anja Kling, Valerie Niehaus	Docudrama	
The Samurai	Till Kleinert	Michel Diercks, Pit Bukowski	Horror	
Sapphire Blue	Felix Fuchssteiner, Katharina Schöde	Maria Ehrich, Jannis Niewöhner	Fantasy	
Sarajevo	Andreas Prochaska	Florian Teichtmeister, Heino Ferch, Friedrich von Thun	Historical drama	a.k.a. Sarajevo 1914: The Eve of the Great War; Austrian-German co-production
Die Schlikkerfrauen	Uwe Janson	Katharina Thalbach, Sky du Mont, Annette Frier, Sonja Gerhardt, Shadi Hedayati, Oliver Korittke	Comedy	
Schmitke	Štěpán Altrichter	Peter Kurth	Drama	German-Czech co-production
Schönefeld Boulevard	Sylke Enders	Julia Jendroßek, Daniel Sträßer, Jani Volanen, Yung Ngo	Drama	
Sein gutes Recht	Isabel Kleefeld	Matthias Habich, Thekla Carola Wied, Götz Schubert, Ulrike Krumbiegel	Drama	
Seitensprung	Sabine Boss	Claudia Michelsen, Stephan Kampwirth, Birte Hanusrichter, Maren Kroymann	Comedy	
The Seventh Dwarf	Harald Siepermann, Boris Aljinovic	—N/a	Animated film	
A Soldier's Love	Thomas Kronthaler	David Rott, Henriette Richter-Röhl	Drama	a.k.a. Julia und der Offizier
Der Spalt	Kim Schicklang	Marie Fischer	Drama	a.k.a. The Gap
Stations of the Cross	Dietrich Brüggemann	Lea van Acken	Drama	Entered into the 64th Berlin International Film Festival
Steal Your Way to Christmas	Sven Bohse	Anna Fischer, Oliver Wnuk, Barnaby Metschurat, Sonja Gerhardt, Patrick Mölleken, Susanna Simon	Crime comedy	a.k.a. Weihnachten für Einsteiger
Stereo	Maximilian Erlenwein	Jürgen Vogel, Moritz Bleibtreu, Petra Schmidt-Schaller	Thriller	
Sternstunde ihres Lebens	Erica von Moeller	Iris Berben, Anna Maria Mühe, Lena Stolze, Dietrich Mattausch	History	
Stille Nächte	Horst Johann Sczerba	Katharina Schüttler, Matthias Koeberlin, Katharina Thalbach, Hanns Zischler	Drama	
Superegos	Benjamin Heisenberg	André Wilms, Georg Friedrich	Drama	
The Suspect	Cyrill Boss, Philipp Stennert	Ulrich Noethen, Jürgen Maurer, Nikolai Kinski	Thriller	a.k.a. Neben der Spur: Adrenalin
Tape 13	Axel Stein	Lars Steinhöfel, Nadine Petry, Cristina do Rego, Sonja Gerhardt, Pit Bukowski	Horror	
Therapy Crashers	Anno Saul	Marie Bäumer, Fahri Yardım, Peri Baumeister, Milan Peschel, Josefine Preuß, Tom Beck, Carolin Kebekus, Herbert Knaup	Comedy	a.k.a. Male Mistakes a.k.a. Irre sind männlich
Till Eulenspiegel	Christian Theede	Jacob Matschenz, Devid Striesow, Anna Bederke, Peter Heinrich Brix	Family	
To Life!	Uwe Janson	Max Riemelt, Hannelore Elsner	Drama	a.k.a. Auf das Leben!
Ein todsicherer Plan	Roland Suso Richter	Richy Müller, Martin Butzke, Julia Brendler	Crime	
Together Alone	Stephan Wagner	Elmar Wepper, Gundi Ellert, Johanna Bittenbinder	Crime	a.k.a. Zwei allein
Too Close for Comfort	Thorsten Näter	Anja Kling, Peter Simonischek, Thomas Sarbacher	Drama	a.k.a. Verhängnisvolle Nähe
Top Girl	Tatjana Turanskyj	Julia Hummer, RP Kahl	Drama	
Die Toten von Hameln	Christian von Castelberg	Julia Koschitz, Matthias Habich, Bjarne Mädel	Thriller	
Tour de Force	Christian Zübert	Florian David Fitz, Julia Koschitz, Jürgen Vogel	Drama	a.k.a. Hin und weg
Trennung auf Italienisch	Florian Gärtner	Julia Brendler, Stephan Luca, Bettina Zimmermann, Christoph Letkowski, Edoardo Purgatori	Comedy	
True Love Ways	Mathieu Seiler	Anna Hausburg	Thriller	
Unexpected	Rainer Kaufmann	Ina Weisse, Erika Marozsán, Ulrich Noethen	Drama	a.k.a. I Want You
Unknown Heart	Giles Foster	Greg Wise, James Fox, Jane Seymour, Julian Sands, Gedeon Burkhard	Drama	British-German co-production
Unter der Haut	Friedemann Fromm	Friedrich Mücke, Karoline Schuch, Uwe Kockisch	Drama	
Der Verlust	Thomas Berger	Heino Ferch, Ina Weisse, Fritzi Haberlandt, Meret Becker, Hans-Jochen Wagner	Drama	a.k.a. The Loss a.k.a. The Breakdown
We Are Young. We Are Strong	Burhan Qurbani	Devid Striesow	Drama	
We Did It for the Money	Manfred Stelzer	Diana Amft, Florian Lukas, Ludger Pistor	Comedy	
Weiter als der Ozean	Isabel Kleefeld	Rosalie Thomass, Robert Gwisdek, Emma Bading, Golo Euler	Drama	
Who Am I	Baran bo Odar	Tom Schilling, Elyas M'Barek, Hannah Herzsprung, Wotan Wilke Möhring	Thriller	
The Whole Shebang	Doris Dörrie	Hannelore Elsner, Nadja Uhl	Comedy	a.k.a. All Inclusive
Wir sind die Neuen	Ralf Westhoff	Gisela Schneeberger, Heiner Lauterbach	Comedy	
The Witness House	Matti Geschonneck	Iris Berben, Matthias Brandt, Tobias Moretti, Udo Samel, Rosalie Thomass, Vicky Krieps	Historical drama	
Worst Case Scenario	Franz Müller	Samuel Finzi, Eva Löbau	Comedy	
Wrecked	Sönke Wortmann	Lavinia Wilson, Jürgen Vogel, Juliane Köhler	Drama	a.k.a. Lap Prayers
Zeit der Zimmerbrände	Vivian Naefe	Uwe Ochsenknecht, Christoph Letkowski, Marie-Lou Sellem, Jytte-Merle Böhrnsen, Jeanette Hain	Crime	
Die Zeit mit Euch	Stefan Krohmer	Herbert Knaup, Leslie Malton, Ulrike Kriener, Henry Hübchen, Johanna Gastdorf, Ernst Stötzner	Drama	a.k.a. The Time with You
Zu mir oder zu dir?	Ingo Rasper	Maren Kroymann, Walter Sittler, Lavinia Wilson	Comedy	a.k.a. A Woman's World
Zwischen den Zeiten	Hansjörg Thurn	Sophie von Kessel, Benjamin Sadler, Marcus Mittermeier, Katharina Thalbach, Hans Peter Hallwachs	Drama	a.k.a. The Space Between

== 2015 ==
Title	Director	Cast	Genre	Notes
3 Türken und ein Baby	Sinan Akkuş	Kostja Ullmann, Kida Khodr Ramadan, Eko Fresh	Comedy	a.k.a. Drei Türken und ein Baby
4 Kings	Theresa von Eltz	Paula Beer, Jella Haase, Jannis Niewöhner	Drama	a.k.a. Four Kings
13 Minutes	Oliver Hirschbiegel	Christian Friedel, Katharina Schüttler, Burghart Klaußner, Johann von Bülow	Historical drama	a.k.a. Elser – Er hätte die Welt verändert
10 Billion: What's on Your Plate?	Valentin Thurn		Documentary	a.k.a. 10 Milliarden – Wie werden wir alle satt?
After Love	Marc Jago	Tanja Petrovsky, Wilson Gonzalez Ochsenknecht, Sven Dolinski, Merab Ninidze	Drama	a.k.a. Die blauen Stunden
After the Fall	Carlo Rola	Christiane Paul, Axel Prahl, Henning Baum, Ernst Stötzner	Drama	a.k.a. Die Himmelsleiter – Sehnsucht nach Morgen
Alky Alky	Axel Ranisch	Heiko Pinkowski, Peter Trabner, Christina Große, Oliver Korittke, Robert Gwisdek, Iris Berben	Drama	a.k.a. Alki Alki
All for None, None for All	Maurus vom Scheidt	Sebastian Bezzel, Hans Sigl, Heiko Pinkowski, Lisa Werlinder, Simon Schwarz	Comedy	a.k.a. Einer für alle, alles im Eimer
As We Were Dreaming	Andreas Dresen	Joel Basman, Merlin Rose, Julius Nitschkoff, Marcel Heuperman, Frederic Haselon, Ruby O. Fee	Drama	a.k.a. While We Were Dreaming
Bach in Brazil	Ansgar Ahlers	Edgar Selge	Comedy, Music	German-Brazilian co-production
The Bank Robbery	Urs Egger	Franz Dinda, Joachim Król, Justus von Dohnányi, Anna Drijver, Hanns Zischler, Herbert Knaup	Drama	
Beck's Last Summer	Frieder Wittich	Christian Ulmen, Nahuel Pérez Biscayart, Eugene Boateng	Comedy	
Berlin One	Marvin Kren	Friedrich Mücke, Antje Traue, Tobias Moretti, Oliver Masucci, Frederick Lau, Emilia Schüle	Thriller	a.k.a. Mordkommission Berlin 1
Besuch für Emma	Ingo Rasper	Dagmar Manzel, Henry Hübchen	Comedy	
Beware of People	Arne Feldhusen	Charly Hübner, Michael Maertens	Comedy	
Beyond This Day	Martin Enlen	Horst Sachtleben, Katja Studt	Drama	a.k.a. Über den Tag hinaus
Big Fish, Small Fish	Jochen Alexander Freydank	Uwe Ochsenknecht, Dietmar Bär, Axel Stein, Jürgen Tarrach, Katharina Thalbach	Comedy	a.k.a. Big Fish. Little Fish.
Bismarck – Härte und Empfindsamkeit	Wilfried Hauke	Peter Striebeck	History	
Bluewater: Nightmare in Paradise	Judith Kennel	Stefanie Stappenbeck, Jean-Yves Berteloot	Drama	a.k.a. Blauwasserleben
Boy 7	Özgür Yıldırım	David Kross, Emilia Schüle	Action thriller	
Bridge of Spies	Steven Spielberg	Tom Hanks, Mark Rylance, Sebastian Koch	Drama	American-German co-production
Bruder vor Luder	Heiko and Roman Lochmann, Tomas Erhart	Heiko and Roman Lochmann, Milena Tscharntke, Oliver Pocher, Ludger Pistor, Axel Stein	Comedy	a.k.a. Bros Before Hoes a.k.a. Pals Before Gals
Der Bunker	Nikias Chryssos	Pit Bukowski, Daniel Fripan	Horror	
CHIX – Back on Stage	Jan Ruzicka	Katja Riemann, Nicolette Krebitz, Sophie von Kessel	Musical	a.k.a. Women a.k.a. Freundinnen – Alle für eine
Coconut Hero	Florian Cossen	Alex Ozerov, Bea Santos, Krista Bridges, Sebastian Schipper, Udo Kier	Drama	Canadian-German co-production
Colonia	Florian Gallenberger	Emma Watson, Daniel Brühl, Michael Nyqvist, Vicky Krieps	Thriller	a.k.a. The Colony a.k.a. Colonia Dignidad – Es gibt kein Zurück. German-French-Luxembourgian co-production
Cuban Without Toil	Dennis Satin	Uwe Ochsenknecht, Jutta Speidel, Gaby Dohm, Peter Sattmann, Saskia Vester	Drama	a.k.a. Kubanisch für Fortgeschrittene
The Culpable	Gerd Schneider	Sebastian Blomberg, Kai Schumann, Sandra Borgmann	Drama	a.k.a. Verfehlung
The Dark Side of the Moon	Stephan Rick	Moritz Bleibtreu, Jürgen Prochnow	Thriller	
Death of a Girl	Thomas Berger	Heino Ferch, Barbara Auer, Anja Kling, Jörg Schüttauf, Hinnerk Schönemann	Crime drama	
Death on the Island	Nicolai Rohde	Lisa Martinek, Rüdiger Vogler	Crime	a.k.a. Tod auf der Insel a.k.a. Inselblut
Disaster	Justus von Dohnányi	Jan Josef Liefers	Crime comedy	
A Doll to Treasure	Franziska Buch	Friederike Becht	Biography	a.k.a. Käthe Kruse
Don't Call Me Grandpa	Markus Herling	Steffen Groth	Comedy	a.k.a. Opa, ledig, jung
Don't Look at Me That Way	Uisenma Borchu	Uisenma Borchu, Catrina Stemmer, Josef Bierbichler	Drama	
Dora or the Sexual Neuroses of Our Parents	Stina Werenfels	Victoria Schulz, Lars Eidinger, Jenny Schily	Drama	Swiss-German co-production
Drunter & Brüder	Ulli Baumann	Valerie Niehaus, Natalia Avelon, Stephan Luca, Steve Windolf	Comedy	a.k.a. Drunter und Brüder
Easy Going	Lars Jessen	Katharina Wackernagel, Fritz Karl, Oliver Wnuk, Rike Schmid	Comedy	a.k.a. Bloß kein Stress
Einmal Hallig und zurück	Hermine Huntgeburth	Anke Engelke, Charly Hübner	Comedy	
Engel unter Wasser	Michael Schneider	Hanno Koffler, Anna Maria Mühe, Anna Schudt, Walter Kreye, Maxim Mehmet, Sascha Alexander Geršak, Heiko Pinkowski	Crime	a.k.a. Submerged Angel
Every Thing Will Be Fine	Wim Wenders	James Franco, Charlotte Gainsbourg, Rachel McAdams, Marie-Josée Croze	Drama	German-Canadian-Norwegian-Swedish-French co-production
Fack ju Göhte 2	Bora Dağtekin	Elyas M'Barek, Jella Haase, Karoline Herfurth, Katja Riemann, Uschi Glas	Comedy	a.k.a. Suck Me Shakespeer 2
Family Commitments	Hanno Olderdissen	Omar El-Saeidi, Max von Pufendorf, Maren Kroymann	Comedy	a.k.a. Familie verpflichtet
Family Party	Lars Kraume	Günther Maria Halmer, Hannelore Elsner, Michaela May, Lars Eidinger, Jördis Triebel	Drama	a.k.a. Family Celebration
Fatal News	Kilian Riedhof	Matthias Matschke, Alexander Fehling, Antje Traue, Luise Heyer, Fabian Hinrichs, Rolf Lassgård	Thriller	a.k.a. Der Fall Barschel
Father-Out-Law	Sven Bohse	Mai Duong Kieu, Michael Gwisdek, Simon Schwarz	Comedy	a.k.a. Mein Schwiegervater, der Stinkstiefel
Floating!	Julia C. Kaiser	Julia Becker, Anna König	Drama	a.k.a. Das Floß!
Frau Müller muss weg!	Sönke Wortmann	Anke Engelke, Justus von Dohnányi, Gabriela Maria Schmeide	Comedy	
Für eine Nacht ... und immer?	Sibylle Tafel	Juliane Köhler, Marc Benjamin, Dominic Raacke, Alice Dwyer	Drama	
German Angst	Jörg Buttgereit, Andreas Marschall, Michal Kosakowski	Lola Gave, Milton Welsh, Andreas Pape	Anthology, Horror	
Das Gewinnerlos	Patrick Winczewski	Matthias Habich, Angela Winkler, Claudia Geisler-Bading	Comedy	
Ghosthunters: On Icy Trails	Tobi Baumann	Anke Engelke, Milo Parker	Family	
Das goldene Ufer	Christoph Schrewe	Miriam Stein, Volker Bruch, Ulrike Folkerts, Walter Sittler	Drama	
A Grand Farewell	Matti Geschonneck	Matthias Habich, Hannelore Elsner	Drama	a.k.a. A Great Departure a.k.a. Ein großer Aufbruch
Grzimek	Roland Suso Richter	Ulrich Tukur, Katharina Schüttler, Barbara Auer	Biography	a.k.a. Serengeti Will Survive
Half Brothers	Christian Alvart	Sido, Teddy Teclebrhan, Fahri Yardım	Comedy	
Happy Hour	Franz Müller	Simon Licht, Mehdi Nebbou, Alexander Hörbe	Comedy	
A Heavy Heart	Thomas Stuber	Peter Kurth	Drama	a.k.a. Herbert
Hedi Schneider Is Stuck	Sonja Heiss	Laura Tonke	Comedy	
Heil	Dietrich Brüggemann	Jerry Hoffmann, Benno Fürmann, Liv Lisa Fries	Comedy	
Help, I Shrunk My Teacher	Sven Unterwaldt	Oskar Keymer, Anja Kling, Axel Stein, Otto Waalkes	Comedy, Fantasy	a.k.a. Hilfe, ich hab meine Lehrerin geschrumpft
Herr Lenz reist in den Frühling	Andreas Kleinert	Ulrich Tukur	Comedy	
Highway to Hellas	Aron Lehmann	Christoph Maria Herbst, Adam Bousdoukos	Comedy	
Hitman: Agent 47	Aleksander Bach	Rupert Friend, Zachary Quinto, Hannah Ware, Thomas Kretschmann, Ciarán Hinds	Action thriller	American-German co-production
Ho Ho Ho to You	Vivian Naefe	Andrea Sawatzki, Axel Milberg, Judy Winter, Günther Maria Halmer, Uwe Ochsenknecht	Drama	a.k.a. Tief durchatmen, die Familie kommt
Homesick	Jakob M. Erwa	Esther Maria Pietsch, Matthias Lier	Thriller	
I'm Off Then	Julia von Heinz	Devid Striesow, Martina Gedeck, Katharina Thalbach	Biography	a.k.a. Ich bin dann mal weg
Im Zweifel	Aelrun Goette	Claudia Michelsen, Henning Baum, Thomas Thieme	Drama	
In the Name of My Son	Damir Lukačević	Tobias Moretti, Maxim Mehmet, Inka Friedrich	Thriller	a.k.a. Your Son's Killer
In-Laws in Love	Hansjörg Thurn	Birge Schade, Nina Kronjäger, Thomas Sarbacher, Martin Brambach	Comedy	a.k.a. Schwägereltern
Die Insassen	Franziska Meyer Price	Wolfgang Stumph	Comedy	a.k.a. The Inmates
Invisible Years	Johannes Fabrick	Julia Koschitz, Tim Bergmann, Lena Lauzemis, Friedrich von Thun	Drama	
Jumping into Love	Hansjörg Thurn	Christiane Paul, Haluk Piyes, Nursel Köse	Comedy	a.k.a. Ein Fisch namens Liebe
Kartoffelsalat – Nicht fragen!	Michael David Pate	Freshtorge, Bianca Claßen, Dagi Bee, Otto Waalkes	Horror comedy	
Krüger aus Almanya	Marc-Andreas Bochert	Horst Krause	Comedy	
Leberkäseland	Nils Willbrandt	Neda Rahmanian	Comedy	
Letter to My Life	Urs Egger	Marie Bäumer, Christina Hecke, Hanns Zischler	Drama	
Der Liebling des Himmels	Dani Levy	Axel Milberg, Mario Adorf, Jenny Schily, Andreja Schneider, Martin Feifel, Hark Bohm	Comedy	
Look Who's Back	David Wnendt	Oliver Masucci, Fabian Busch, Katja Riemann, Christoph Maria Herbst	Comedy	a.k.a. Er ist wieder da
The Lost Brother	Matti Geschonneck	Katharina Lorenz, Charly Hübner, Noah Kraus	Drama	a.k.a. Lost
Lost in the Living	Robert Manson	Tadhg Murphy, Aylin Tezel	Drama	Irish-German co-production
Luis Trenker	Wolfgang Murnberger	Tobias Moretti, Brigitte Hobmeier	Biography	a.k.a. Trenker vs. Riefenstahl a.k.a. Trenker and Riefenstahl
Macho Man	Christof Wahl	Christian Ulmen, Aylin Tezel	Comedy	
Mädchen im Eis	Stefan Krohmer	Lucie Heinze, Aleksei Guskov, Yuri Kolokolnikov	Comedy	a.k.a. Girl on Ice a.k.a. Girl in the Ice. German-Russian co-production
The Manny	Matthias Schweighöfer	Matthias Schweighöfer, Milan Peschel	Comedy	a.k.a. Der Nanny
Mara and the Firebringer	Tommy Krappweis	Lilian Prent, Jan Josef Liefers, Christoph Maria Herbst, Esther Schweins, Eva Habermann	Fantasy	
Master of Death	Daniel Harrich	Hanno Koffler, Heiner Lauterbach, Veronica Ferres, Alina Levshin, Axel Milberg, Herbert Knaup, August Zirner	Thriller	a.k.a. Merchants of Death
Matthiesens Töchter	Titus Selge	Matthias Habich, Ulrike C. Tscharre, Julia Jäger, Anja Antonowicz	Comedy	
Me and Kaminski	Wolfgang Becker	Daniel Brühl, Jesper Christensen, Geraldine Chaplin, Amira Casar, Denis Lavant, Jördis Triebel	Comedy drama	
Mein vergessenes Leben	Gernot Krää	Robert Atzorn, Natalia Belitski	Drama	
The Misplaced World	Margarethe von Trotta	Barbara Sukowa, Katja Riemann, Matthias Habich, Karin Dor	Drama	a.k.a. Die abhandene Welt
Mrs. Roggenschaub's Journey	Kai Wessel	Hannelore Hoger, Rahul Chakraborty, Christian Redl, Michaela May	Comedy	
The Murderer's Mother	Carlo Rola	Natalia Wörner, Lucas Reiber, Axel Prahl, Ernst Stötzner, Sylvester Groth	Crime	
My Daughter Anne Frank	Raymond Ley	Mala Emde, Götz Schubert	War, Drama	
My Second-Hand Man	Lars Jessen	Christiane Paul, Fritz Karl	Comedy	a.k.a. Mein gebrauchter Mann
Nacht der Angst	Gabriela Zerhau	Nina Kunzendorf, Friederike Becht	Drama	
Naked Among Wolves	Philipp Kadelbach	Florian Stetter, Peter Schneider, Sylvester Groth	Drama, War	
Nele in Berlin	Katinka Feistl	Cornelia Gröschel, Katharina Müller-Elmau, August Zirner, Vladimir Burlakov, Dominique Horwitz, Uwe Ochsenknecht	Comedy	
Die Neue	Buket Alakuş	Iris Berben, Ava Celik, Hans-Jochen Wagner	Drama	
The New Life of Ina	Florian Froschmayer	Andrea Sawatzki, August Zirner	Drama	a.k.a. The Worst Has Yet to Come a.k.a. Es kommt noch besser
Nicht schon wieder Rudi!	İsmail Şahin, Oona Devi Liebich	Matthias Brenner	Comedy	a.k.a. Oh No, Not Rudy Again!
The Nightmare	Achim Bornhak	Carolyn Genzkow, Wilson Gonzalez Ochsenknecht, Kim Gordon	Drama	a.k.a. Der Nachtmahr
One Breath	Christian Zübert	Jördis Triebel, Chara Mata Giannatou	Drama	
Ooops! Noah Is Gone...	Toby Genkel, Sean McCormack	—N/a	Animated film	a.k.a. Two by Two a.k.a. All Creatures Big And Small. German-American-Belgian-Irish-Luxembourgish co-production
Outside the Box	Philip Koch	Volker Bruch, Vicky Krieps, Stefan Konarske, Sascha Alexander Geršak, Lavinia Wilson, Hanns Zischler	Black comedy	
Pampa Blues	Kai Wessel	Paula Beer, Joachim Król, Sven Gielnik	Comedy	
The People vs. Fritz Bauer	Lars Kraume	Burghart Klaußner, Ronald Zehrfeld, Lilith Stangenberg	Biography	
Platonov	Andreas Morell	Robert Besta, Franziska Petri, Claudia Mehnert, Kida Khodr Ramadan	Drama	a.k.a. Platonow
The Procedure	Alexander Costea	Aljoscha Stadelmann, Max Wagner	Crime drama	a.k.a. Die Maßnahme
Punk Berlin 1982	Oskar Roehler	Tom Schilling, Emilia Schüle, Wilson Gonzalez Ochsenknecht	Drama	a.k.a. Tod den Hippies!! Es lebe der Punk
Radiant Sea	Stefan Butzmühlen	Martin Sznur, Jules Sagot	Drama	a.k.a. Lichtes Meer
Remember	Atom Egoyan	Christopher Plummer, Martin Landau, Bruno Ganz, Jürgen Prochnow	Drama	Canadian-German co-production
Sanctuary	Marc Brummund	Louis Hofmann, Alexander Held, Stephan Grossmann	Drama	a.k.a. Freistatt
The Santa Claus Gang	Franziska Meyer Price	Heiner Lauterbach, Oliver Korittke, Wolfgang Stumph, Annette Frier, Collien Fernandes	Comedy	a.k.a. Weihnachts-Männer. Remake of The Santa Claus Gang (2010)
Schmidts Katze	Marc Schlegel	Michael Lott, Christiane Seidel, Michael Kessler	Comedy	a.k.a. Schmidt's Nine Lives
Secret Hope	Florian Baxmeyer	Christiane Hörbiger, Nadine Boske, Margarita Broich	Drama	a.k.a. Auf der Straße
Shed My Skin	Stefan Schaller	Merlin Rose, Claudia Michelsen, Johann von Bülow, Leonard Proxauf, Mercedes Müller, Manuel Rubey	Drama	a.k.a. Aus der Haut. German-Austrian co-production
Silvia S. – Blinde Wut	Friedemann Fromm	Maria Simon, Florian Lukas, Sophie von Kessel, Ulrike Kriener	Thriller	a.k.a. Silvia S: Blind Rage
The Small and the Wicked	Markus Sehr	Christoph Maria Herbst, Peter Kurth	Crime comedy	
Solness	Michael Klette	Thomas Sarbacher, Julia Schacht, Dieter Meier, André Hennicke, Robert Stadlober	Drama	a.k.a. The Master Builder
Starfighter	Miguel Alexandre	Picco von Groote, Steve Windolf, Frederick Lau, Alice Dwyer, Paula Kalenberg	Drama	
Stroppy Cow, Stubborn Ram	Johannes Fabrick	Wotan Wilke Möhring	Comedy	a.k.a. Kleine Ziege, sturer Bock
Stung	Benni Diez	Matt O'Leary, Jessica Cook, Lance Henriksen, Clifton Collins Jr.	Horror	American-German co-production
Summers Downstairs	Tom Sommerlatte	Godehard Giese, Karin Hanczewski, Sebastian Fräsdorf	Comedy	a.k.a. Im Sommer wohnt er unten
Sweet September	Florian Froschmayer	Caroline Peters, Mišel Matičević, Regula Grauwiller, Thomas Limpinsel	Drama	
Tag der Wahrheit	Anna Justice	Vicky Krieps, Florian Lukas, Benjamin Sadler	Thriller	a.k.a. Kollwein's Day of Truth. German-French-Austrian co-production
Taxi	Kerstin Ahlrichs	Rosalie Thomass, Peter Dinklage, Stipe Erceg	Drama	a.k.a. Night Ride
Time to Say Goodbye	Viviane Andereggen	Maximilian Ehrenreich, Catherine de Léan, Florian Stetter, Lavinia Wilson	Comedy	a.k.a. Simon Says Goodbye to His Foreskin
Too Young to Die	Lars Becker	Nicholas Ofczarek, Fritz Karl, Jessica Schwarz, Edin Hasanović, Jürgen Maurer, Anna Loos	Crime	a.k.a. Too Soon to Die a.k.a. Too Early to Die a.k.a. Zum Sterben zu früh
Die Tote aus der Schlucht	Christian Theede	Rosalie Thomass, Friedrich von Thun, August Schmölzer, Lavinia Wilson	Thriller	a.k.a. Dead Woman from the Canyon
Tough Love	Rosa von Praunheim	Hanno Koffler, Luise Heyer, Katy Karrenbauer	Drama	a.k.a. Härte
Traumfrauen	Anika Decker	Hannah Herzsprung, Karoline Herfurth, Palina Rojinski, Iris Berben, Elyas M'Barek	Comedy	a.k.a. Man of My Dreams
Trouble in the Tropics	Andi Niessner	Nadeshda Brennicke, Valerie Niehaus, Heio von Stetten, Lena Klenke	Comedy	a.k.a. Zwei Familien auf der Palme
Trust Me	Francis Meletzky	Jürgen Vogel, Julia Koschitz, August Zirner, Sascha Alexander Geršak	Thriller	
Twilight Over Burma	Sabine Derflinger	Daweerit Chullasapya, Maria Ehrich	Drama	Austrian-German co-production
The Two Twins	Isabel Kleefeld	Christoph Maria Herbst, Ulrike C. Tscharre, Sophie von Kessel	Comedy	a.k.a. Besser als Du
Die Udo Honig Story	Uwe Janson	Uwe Ochsenknecht, Hannes Jaenicke, Heiner Lauterbach	Comedy	
Die Ungehorsame	Holger Haase	Felicitas Woll, Marcus Mittermeier, Alina Levshin	Drama	
Unterm Radar	Elmar Fischer	Christiane Paul, Heino Ferch, Fabian Hinrichs	Thriller	a.k.a. Under the Radar
Unverschämtes Glück	Hartmut Schoen	Katja Flint, Armin Rohde	Comedy	
Valentine's Kiss	Sarah Harding	Rupert Graves, John Hannah, Jean-Yves Berteloot, Katja Weitzenböck, Zoë Tapper, Eileen Atkins	Drama	British-German co-production
Victoria	Sebastian Schipper	Laia Costa, Frederick Lau	Crime drama	
The Village of Murderers	Niki Stein	Alina Levshin, Anna Brüggemann, Anna Loos, Benjamin Sadler, Jürgen Tarrach	Thriller	
Village of Silence	Hans Steinbichler	Petra Schmidt-Schaller, Ina Weisse, Helmuth Lohner	Drama	a.k.a. City of Secrets
The von Trapp Family: A Life of Music	Ben Verbong	Rosemary Harris, Eliza Bennett, Matthew Macfadyen, Yvonne Catterfeld	Biography, Music	
The Watcher	Andreas Herzog	Christiane Paul, Karoline Eichhorn, William Houston, Sarah Quintrell, Andreas Pietschmann, Lloyd Owen, Helen Latham, Kathryn O'Reilly, Benjamin Smith	Thriller	a.k.a. Der Beobachter
We Monsters	Sebastian Ko	Mehdi Nebbou, Ulrike C. Tscharre, Janina Fautz	Drama	
The Weather Inside	Isabelle Stever	Maria Furtwängler	Drama	
When Summer Ends	Nikolaus Leytner	Thomas Schubert, Julia Koschitz	Drama	Austrian-German co-production
Where Are You Going, Habibi?	Tor Iben	Cem Alkan, Martin Walde	Drama	
The White Ethiopian	Tim Trageser	Jürgen Vogel, Sayat Demissie, Paula Kalenberg, Thomas Thieme	Crime	a.k.a. Der weiße Äthiopier
You Gotta Have Balls	Isabel Kleefeld	Dieter Hallervorden, Anja Kling	Comedy	a.k.a. Chuzpe – Klops braucht der Mensch!
Zoé & Julie: Hidden Marks	Markus Fischer	Nurit Hirschfeld, Thomas Sarbacher	Drama	Swiss-German co-production
Zum Teufel mit der Wahrheit	Granz Henman	Bettina Zimmermann, Christoph M. Ohrt, Eugen Bauder	Comedy	
Zweimal lebenslänglich	Johannes Fabrick	Julia Koschitz, Felix Klare	Drama	a.k.a. Two Life Sentences

== 2016 ==
Title	Director	Cast	Genre	Notes
5 Frauen	Olaf Kraemer	Julia Dietze, Anna König, Odine Johne, Kaya Marie Möller, Korinna Krauss	Drama	a.k.a. 5 Women a.k.a. Five Women a.k.a. Fünf Frauen
1000 Mexicans	Philipp Scholz	Bastian Reiber, Arnel Tači	Comedy	
24 Weeks	Anne Zohra Berrached	Julia Jentsch, Bjarne Mädel	Drama	
Adidas vs. Puma: The Brother's Feud	Oliver Dommenget	Ken Duken, Torben Liebrecht	Biography	
Agnes	Johannes Schmid	Odine Johne, Stephan Kampwirth	Drama	
Agony	David Clay Diaz	Samuel Schneider	Drama	German-Austrian co-production
All of a Sudden	Aslı Özge	Sebastian Hülk, Julia Jentsch, Hanns Zischler, Sascha Alexander Geršak, Luise Heyer	Drama	German-Dutch-French co-production
Alone in Berlin	Vincent Perez	Emma Thompson, Brendan Gleeson, Daniel Brühl	Drama, War	French-British-German co-production
Anhedonia	Patrick Siegfried Zimmer	Robert Stadlober, Paula Kalenberg, Blixa Bargeld, Dirk von Lowtzow	Science fiction	
At Eye Level	Joachim Dollhopf, Evi Goldbrunner	Jordan Prentice, Luis Vorbach	Drama	
Aufbruch	Hermine Huntgeburth	Anna Fischer, Ulrich Noethen, Margarita Broich	Drama	a.k.a. Departure
Austerlitz	Sergei Loznitsa		Documentary	
Beat Beat Heart	Luise Brinkmann	Lana Cooper, Saskia Vester	Drama	
The Beautiful Days of Aranjuez	Wim Wenders	Reda Kateb, Sophie Semin, Jens Harzer, Nick Cave	Drama	
Because I Love You	Christina Schiewe	Felicitas Woll, Renato Schuch	Drama	
Bergfried	Jo Baier	Peter Simonischek, Fabrizio Bucci, Katharina Haudum, Gisela Schneeberger, Eva Herzig	Drama	Austrian-German co-production
The Big Beef	Michael Rowitz	Fritz Karl, Herbert Knaup, Christina Hecke	Comedy	a.k.a. Das beste Stück vom Braten
The Bloom of Yesterday	Chris Kraus	Lars Eidinger, Adèle Haenel, Jan Josef Liefers, Hannah Herzsprung, Rolf Hoppe	Comedy	a.k.a. The Flowers of Yesterday
Böse Wetter	Johannes Grieser	Matthias Koeberlin, Götz George, Gudrun Landgrebe	Drama	
The Boss Is Dead	Markus Sehr	Fritzi Haberlandt	Crime	a.k.a. Der Chef ist tot
Botticelli Inferno	Ralph Loop		Documentary	
The Boy Who Wants to Live	Feo Aladag	Nama Traore, Jesper Christensen, Milan Peschel, Katja Riemann, Alwara Höfels, Karoline Eichhorn	Drama	a.k.a. Der Andere – Eine Familiengeschichte
Die Büffel sind los!	Tomy Wigand	Marc Benjamin, Anna Unterberger	Comedy	
Center of My World	Jakob M. Erwa	Louis Hofmann, Jannik Schümann, Svenja Jung, Sabine Timoteo	Drama	a.k.a. Centre of My World. German-Austrian co-production
Collide	Eran Creevy	Nicholas Hoult, Felicity Jones, Anthony Hopkins, Ben Kingsley	Action thriller	American-German co-production
Conni & Co	Franziska Buch	Emma Schweiger	Family	
Couple's Retreat	Jan Georg Schütte	Anke Engelke, Bjarne Mädel, Anneke Kim Sarnau, Devid Striesow, Sebastian Blomberg	Comedy	a.k.a. Wellness für Paare
A Cure for Wellness	Gore Verbinski	Dane DeHaan, Jason Isaacs, Mia Goth	Horror thriller	American-German co-production
Dance on Broadway	Helmut Metzger	Minh-Khai Phan-Thi, Thomas Unger, Tyron Ricketts, Walter Kreye	Drama, Music	
Dancing Quietly	Philipp Eichholtz	Martina Schöne-Radunski	Drama	a.k.a. Luca tanzt leise
A Dangerous Fortune	Christian Schwochow	Dominic Thorburn, Laura de Boer, Jeanette Hain, Luca Marinelli, Albrecht Schuch, Daniel Sträßer, Thorsten Merten, Axel Milberg, Rolf Hoppe	Drama	
Dating Alarm	Holger Haase	Tom Beck, Friederike Kempter, Axel Stein	Comedy	
Dead Man Working	Marc Bauder	Benjamin Lillie, Wolfram Koch, Jördis Triebel, Manfred Zapatka, Jenny Schily	Drama	
Deadly Emotions	Marcus O. Rosenmüller	Franziska Weisz, Katharina Wackernagel, Arnd Klawitter, Philipp Christopher	Thriller	
Deadly Leaks	Sherry Hormann	Nina Kunzendorf, Anke Engelke, Katja Riemann, Oliver Masucci, Paula Beer, Sabine Timoteo	Thriller	a.k.a. Tödliche Geheimnisse
Desired Children	Emily Atef	Victoria Mayer, Godehard Giese	Drama	a.k.a. Wunschkinder
Dimitrios Schulze	Cüneyt Kaya	Adam Bousdoukos, Kida Khodr Ramadan, Burak Yiğit, Eleonore Weisgerber	Crime	
Dinky Sinky	Mareille Klein	Katrin Röver	Comedy	
Dolores	Michael Rösel	Franziska Petri, Udo Schenk	Thriller, Fantasy	
The Dreamed Path	Angela Schanelec	Maren Eggert, Phil Hayes, Miriam Jakob, Thorbjörn Björnsson	Drama	a.k.a. Der traumhafte Weg
Drei Väter sind besser als keiner	Till Franzen	Julia Hartmann, Florian Panzner, Suzanne von Borsody	Comedy	a.k.a. 3 Väter sind besser als keiner
Emerald Green	Felix Fuchssteiner, Katharina Schöde	Maria Ehrich, Jannis Niewöhner, Peter Simonischek	Fantasy	
The Eremites	Ronny Trocker	Andreas Lust, Orsi Tóth, Ingrid Burkhard	Drama	German-Austrian-Italian co-production
Erich Kästner and Little Tuesday	Wolfgang Murnberger	Florian David Fitz	Biography	
Escapades with Friends	Markus Herling	Samuel Finzi, Caroline Peters, Aglaia Szyszkowitz, Fritz Karl, Uwe Ochsenknecht	Comedy	a.k.a. Seitensprung mit Freunden
Ever Since I Found You	Michael Hofmann	Martina Gedeck, Manuel Rubey, Robert Palfrader, Katharina Schüttler	Comedy	a.k.a. Seit Du da bist. German-Austrian co-production
Fado	Jonas Rothlaender	Golo Euler, Luise Heyer	Drama	German-Portuguese co-production
Familie Lotzmann auf den Barrikaden	Axel Ranisch	Gisela Schneeberger, Jörg Gudzuhn, Eva Löbau, Sabin Tambrea, Mišel Matičević, Heiko Pinkowski, Peter Trabner	Comedy	
Family!	Dror Zahavi	Iris Berben, Jürgen Vogel, Anna Maria Mühe, Katharina Thalbach, Natalia Belitski	Drama	
Fog in August	Kai Wessel	Ivo Pietzcker, Sebastian Koch, Fritzi Haberlandt	War, Drama	
Frantz	François Ozon	Paula Beer, Pierre Niney	Drama	French-German co-production
Freddy/Eddy	Tini Tüllmann	Felix Schäfer, Jessica Schwarz, Burghart Klaußner	Thriller	
A French Summer	Nana Neul	Paula Kalenberg, Florian Panzner, Vladimir Korneev	Comedy	a.k.a. Eine Sommerliebe zu dritt
Friend Request	Simon Verhoeven	Alycia Debnam-Carey	Horror thriller	a.k.a. Unfriend
Fritz Lang	Gordian Maugg	Heino Ferch, Johanna Gastdorf	Biography	
Ein gefährliches Angebot	Hannu Salonen	Petra Schmidt-Schaller, Armin Rohde, Christian Berkel, André Hennicke	Thriller	a.k.a. A Dangerous Proposal
The General Case	Stephan Wagner	Ulrich Noethen, David Kross	Drama	a.k.a. Die Akte General
Getting Rid of Mum	Franziska Buch	Hannelore Elsner, Anneke Kim Sarnau	Comedy	a.k.a. Die Diva, Thailand und wir!
The Girl in the Marsh	Axel Barth	Robert Atzorn, Alexandra Neldel, Jytte-Merle Böhrnsen, Max von Pufendorf	Crime	a.k.a. The Girl from the Peat Bog a.k.a. Das Mädchen aus dem Totenmoor
The Glassblower	Christiane Balthasar	Luise Heyer, Maria Ehrich	Drama	a.k.a. Die Glasbläserin
Goodbye Berlin	Fatih Akin	Tristan Göbel, Anand Batbileg, Mercedes Müller	Road movie	a.k.a. Why We Took the Car a.k.a. Tschick
Goster	Didi Danquart	Bruno Cathomas, Julia Riedler	Thriller, Science fiction	
Gotthard	Urs Egger	Miriam Stein, Pasquale Aleardi, Maxim Mehmet, Carlos Leal	Drama	Swiss-German-Austrian co-production
Greetings from Fukushima	Doris Dörrie	Rosalie Thomass, Kaori Momoi	Drama	
Gut zu Vögeln	Mira Thiel	Anja Knauer, Max von Thun, Max Giermann	Comedy	
Die Hände meiner Mutter	Florian Eichinger	Andreas Döhler, Katrin Pollitt, Jessica Schwarz, Katharina Behrens, Heiko Pinkowski, Sebastian Fräsdorf	Drama	a.k.a. Hands of a Mother
The Hannas	Julia C. Kaiser	Anna König, Till Butterbach, Ines Marie Westernströer, Julia Becker	Comedy	
The Have-Nots	Florian Hoffmeister	Julia Jentsch, Sebastian Zimmler	Drama	a.k.a. Die Habenichtse
Heart of Stone	Johannes Naber	Frederick Lau, Moritz Bleibtreu, Henriette Confurius	Fantasy	a.k.a. Das kalte Herz
Hedda	Andreas Kleinert	Susanne Wolff, Godehard Giese	Drama	
Hidden Identity	Till Endemann	Nina Kunzendorf, Benjamin Sadler, Stephanie Japp, Alwara Höfels, Carlo Ljubek, Heiner Lauterbach	Thriller	a.k.a. Das Programm
Hidden Reserves	Valentin Hitz	Clemens Schick, Lena Lauzemis, Daniel Olbrychski	Science fiction	a.k.a. Stille Reserven. German-Austrian-Swiss co-production
Hilfe, wir sind offline!	Ingo Rasper	Nina Kunzendorf, Christoph M. Ohrt	Comedy	a.k.a. Oh My God, We're Offline
Der Hodscha und die Piepenkötter	Buket Alakuş	Hilmi Sözer, Anna Stieblich, Damian Hardung, Fabian Busch	Comedy	
A Hologram for the King	Tom Tykwer	Tom Hanks	Drama	American-German co-production
Hotel Sacher	Robert Dornhelm	Josefine Preuß, Julia Koschitz, Ursula Strauss, Jasna Fritzi Bauer, Peter Simonischek	Drama	a.k.a. Das Sacher – In bester Gesellschaft. Austrian-German co-production
House Without Roof	Soleen Yusef	Mina Özlem Sagdiç, Sasun Sayan, Murat Seven	Drama	
How Men Talk About Women	Henrik Regel	Oliver Korittke, Barnaby Metschurat, Ellenie Salvo González, Florence Kasumba	Comedy	
Der Hund begraben	Sebastian Stern	Justus von Dohnányi, Juliane Köhler, Georg Friedrich	Comedy	
If It's Love	Franziska Meyer Price	Jutta Speidel, Harald Krassnitzer, Peter Kremer	Drama	
Immer Ärger mit Opa Charly	Marcus Ulbricht	Ulrich Pleitgen, Inka Friedrich, Tobias Oertel	Comedy	
The Impossible Picture	Sandra Wollner	Jana McKinnon	Drama, Mystery	Austrian-German co-production
Die Informantin	Philipp Leinemann	Aylin Tezel, Ken Duken, Timur Işık, Suzanne von Borsody	Crime	a.k.a. The Informant
Inside the Tunnel	Kai Wessel	Maria Simon, Carlo Ljubek, Jasmin Gerat	Thriller	a.k.a. In the Tunnel
An Inspector Returns	Matti Geschonneck	Uwe Kockisch, Sylvester Groth, Ulrike C. Tscharre, Sophie von Kessel	Crime	a.k.a. Ein Kommissar kehrt zurück
Jack the Ripper: The London Slasher	Sebastian Niemann	Sonja Gerhardt, Falk Hentschel, Sabin Tambrea, Nicholas Farrell, Vladimir Burlakov	Thriller	
Jonathan	Piotr J. Lewandowski	Jannis Niewöhner, Barbara Auer, Julia Koschitz, Thomas Sarbacher, André Hennicke	Drama	
Kalinka	Vincent Garenq	Daniel Auteuil, Sebastian Koch	Drama	a.k.a. In Her Name. French-German co-production
Kaltfront	Lars Henning	Jenny Schily, Lana Cooper, Christoph Bach, Leonard Carow, Rainer Bock	Crime	
Keine Ehe ohne Pause	Patrick Winczewski	Heino Ferch, Inka Friedrich	Comedy	
Killing for Love	Marcus Vetter, Karin Steinberger	Jens Söring	Documentary	
The Last Pig	Aron Lehmann	Golo Euler, Rosalie Thomass	Comedy	a.k.a. Die letzte Sau
LenaLove	Florian Gaag	Emilia Schüle, Jannik Schümann	Thriller	
Letzte Ausfahrt Gera – Acht Stunden mit Beate Zschäpe	Raymond Ley	Lisa Wagner, Joachim Król, Christina Große, Axel Milberg, Udo Samel, Özay Fecht, Meral Perin	Docudrama	
Die letzte Reise	Florian Baxmeyer	Christiane Hörbiger, Suzanne von Borsody, Nina Kronjäger, Burghart Klaußner	Drama	
Liebe bis in den Mord	Thomas Nennstiel	Felicitas Woll, Gabriel Raab, Thomas Unger, Gisela Schneeberger	Thriller	a.k.a. Love Until Death – An Alpine Thriller
Looping	Leonie Krippendorff	Jella Haase, Lana Cooper, Marie-Lou Sellem	Drama	
Lotte	Julius Schultheiß	Karin Hanczewski	Drama	
Lou Andreas-Salomé, The Audacity to be Free	Cordula Kablitz-Post	Katharina Lorenz, Liv Lisa Fries, Nicole Heesters, Alexander Scheer, Peter Simonischek	Biography	a.k.a. In Love with Lou: A Philosopher's Life
Mali Blues	Lutz Gregor		Documentary, Music	
A Man Under Suspicion	Thomas Stuber	Mark Waschke, Petra Schmidt-Schaller, Hanns Zischler, Peter Kurth	Thriller	
Manhunt: Escape to the Carpathians	Dominik Graf	Ulrike C. Tscharre, Ronald Zehrfeld, Dragoș Bucur	Thriller	a.k.a. Zielfahnder – Flucht in die Karpaten
Marija	Michael Koch	Margarita Breitkreiz, Georg Friedrich	Drama	German-Swiss co-production
Marthe's Secret	Roland Suso Richter	Ruby O. Fee, Steve Windolf, Franz Xaver Kroetz	Drama	a.k.a. The Secret of the Midwife
A Minute's Silence	Thorsten Schmidt	Julia Koschitz, Jonas Nay	Drama	a.k.a. Minute of Silence a.k.a. Stella
The Missing Woman	Horst Johann Sczerba	Corinna Harfouch, Ulrich Matthes, Jörg Hartmann, Lorna Ishema	Crime	a.k.a. Die vermisste Frau
Monkey King	Oliver Rihs	Hans-Jochen Wagner, Samuel Finzi, Jytte-Merle Böhrnsen, Marc Hosemann, Oliver Korittke, Jule Böwe	Comedy	a.k.a. Affenkönig. German‐Swiss co‐production
Morris from America	Chad Hartigan	Craig Robinson, Markees Christmas	Comedy	American-German co-production
The Most Beautiful Day	Florian David Fitz	Matthias Schweighöfer, Florian David Fitz, Alexandra Maria Lara	Comedy	a.k.a. Der geilste Tag
Mum Won't Be Leaving Anymore	Vivian Naefe	Mariele Millowitsch, Mina Tander, Simon Schwarz, André Jung	Drama	a.k.a. Mama geht nicht mehr
Murderous Silence	Friedemann Fromm	Jan Josef Liefers, Sylvie Testud, Peter Lohmeyer	Crime	
My Parent's Wedding	Connie Walther	Senta Berger, Günther Maria Halmer, Anja Kling, Anna Fischer, Nicholas Ofczarek, Maren Kroymann	Comedy	
National Bird	Sonia Kennebeck		Documentary	American-German co-production
Neid ist auch keine Lösung	Tobi Baumann	Stefanie Stappenbeck, Matthias Koeberlin, Christina Hecke, Götz Otto, Stephan Luca	Comedy	a.k.a. Envy Isn't an Answer
Neo Rauch: Comrades and Companions	Nicola Graef	Neo Rauch	Documentary	
Neu in unserer Familie	Stefan Krohmer	Benno Fürmann, Maja Schöne, Henning Baum, Inez Bjørg David	Comedy	
Never the Same Again	Johannes Fabrick	Fritz Karl, Christiane Paul	Drama	a.k.a. Nie mehr wie es war
NSU German History X: The Investigators	Florian Cossen	Florian Lukas, Sylvester Groth, Ulrich Noethen	Docudrama	a.k.a. Die Ermittler – Nur für den Dienstgebrauch (Mitten in Deutschland: NSU)
NSU German History X: The Perpetrators	Christian Schwochow	Anna Maria Mühe, Albrecht Schuch, Sebastian Urzendowsky	Docudrama	a.k.a. Die Täter – Heute ist nicht alle Tage (Mitten in Deutschland: NSU)
NSU German History X: The Victims	Züli Aladağ	Almila Bagriacik	Docudrama	a.k.a. Die Opfer – Vergesst mich nicht (Mitten in Deutschland: NSU)
Nur eine Handvoll Leben	Francis Meletzky	Annette Frier, Christian Erdmann	Drama	
Nur nicht aufregen!	Thomas Jahn	Leonard Lansink, Martin Brambach, Senna Gammour, Tim Kalkhof, Sönke Möhring, Aleksandar Jovanovic	Comedy	
Offline: Are You Ready for the Next Level?	Florian Schnell	Moritz Jahn, Mala Emde, David Schütter, Florence Kasumba	Action comedy	
Operation Naked	Mario Sixtus	Sarah-Rebecca Gerstner	Comedy	
Original Bliss	Sven Taddicken	Martina Gedeck, Ulrich Tukur	Drama	a.k.a. Gleißendes Glück
Paula	Christian Schwochow	Carla Juri	Biography	a.k.a. Paula Modersohn-Becker
Peter Handke: In the Woods, Might Be Late	Corinna Belz	Peter Handke	Documentary	
Picturing War	Konstantin Flemig		Documentary	
Plan B	Ufuk Genç, Michael Popescu	Can Aydin, Cha-Lee Yoon, Phong Giang, Eugene Boateng, Gedeon Burkhard	Action comedy	
Point Blank	Philipp Kadelbach	Tom Schilling, Edin Hasanović	Crime	a.k.a. Auf kurze Distanz
Race	Stephen Hopkins	Stephan James, Jason Sudeikis, Jeremy Irons, William Hurt, David Kross, Barnaby Metschurat	Biography, Sport	Canadian-German-French co-production
Radio Heimat	Matthias Kutschmann	David Hugo Schmitz, Maximilian Mundt, Jan Bülow	Comedy	a.k.a. Radio Home
Resident Evil: The Final Chapter	Paul W. S. Anderson	Milla Jovovich	Action, Horror	German-Canadian-French-Australian-American co-production
Rivals Forever: The Sneaker Battle	Cyrill Boss, Philipp Stennert	Christian Friedel, Hanno Koffler, Hannah Herzsprung, Alina Levshin, Joachim Król	Biography	a.k.a. Die Dasslers – Pioniere, Brüder und Rivalen
Rockabilly Requiem	Till Müller-Edenborn	Ruby O. Fee, Ben Münchow, Sebastian Tiede	Drama, Music	
Sag mir nichts	Andreas Kleinert	Ursina Lardi, Ronald Zehrfeld	Drama	a.k.a. Do Not Tell Me
Salt and Fire	Werner Herzog	Michael Shannon, Veronica Ferres, Gael García Bernal	Thriller	American-German-French co-production
Schlimmer geht immer	Kai Meyer-Ricks	Sebastian Bezzel, Nadja Becker, Manuel Cortez, Heiko Pinkowski	Comedy	
Scrappin'	Max Zähle	Lucas Gregorowicz, Frederick Lau, Jan-Gregor Kremp	Crime comedy	a.k.a. Wreck It! a.k.a. Schrotten!
Seduced: In the Arms of Another	Markus Herling	Isabell Gerschke, Julian Weigend	Comedy	a.k.a. Verführt – In den Armen eines Anderen
Seitenwechsel	Vivian Naefe	Wotan Wilke Möhring, Mina Tander	Comedy, Fantasy	Remake of If I Were You (2006)
Sex & Crime	Paul Florian Müller	Wotan Wilke Möhring, Fabian Busch, Claudia Eisinger	Crime comedy	a.k.a. Sex and Crime
Shakespeare's Last Round	Achim Bornhak	Iris Berben, Ruby O. Fee, Anneke Kim Sarnau, Heiko Pinkowski, Alexander Scheer, Saralisa Volm, Reiner Schöne, Carolina Thiele	Drama	a.k.a. Shakespeares letzte Runde
Shiverstone Castle	Ralf Huettner	Maurizio Magno, Henning Baum, Sophie Rois, Harald Schmidt	Family	a.k.a. Burg Schreckenstein
Shock Therapy	Lars Becker	Hinnerk Schönemann, Sophie Rois, Kurt Krömer, Marlene Morreis, Armin Rohde, Lisa Maria Potthoff, Peter Lohmeyer	Comedy	a.k.a. Der mit dem Schlag
The Silence That Follows	Nikolaus Leytner	Ursula Strauss, Peter Schneider, Sophie Stockinger	Drama	a.k.a. Die Stille danach. Austrian-German co-production
SMS für Dich	Karoline Herfurth	Karoline Herfurth, Friedrich Mücke, Nora Tschirner, Frederick Lau, Katja Riemann	Comedy	a.k.a. Text for You
Snowden	Oliver Stone	Joseph Gordon-Levitt	Biography	American-German-French co-production
Speaking of Luck	Ulrike Grote	Janna Striebeck, Katharina Müller-Elmau, Karoline Eichhorn, Nicole Heesters	Comedy	a.k.a. Apropos Glück
Spuren der Rache	Nikolai Müllerschön	Heiner Lauterbach, André Hennicke, Uwe Bohm, Dar Salim, Blerim Destani, Melanie Winiger	Thriller	
Stadtlandliebe	Marco Kreuzpaintner	Jessica Schwarz, Tom Beck, Uwe Ochsenknecht	Comedy	
Stefan Zweig: Farewell to Europe	Maria Schrader	Josef Hader, Barbara Sukowa	Biography	a.k.a. Vor der Morgenröte
Das Tagebuch der Anne Frank	Hans Steinbichler	Lea van Acken	War, Biography	a.k.a. The Diary Of Anne Frank
Ein Teil von uns	Nicole Weegmann	Brigitte Hobmeier, Jutta Hoffmann	Drama	
Tempel	Philipp Leinemann	Ken Duken, Antje Traue, Chiara Schoras, Michelle Barthel, Aleksandar Jovanovic, Thomas Thieme	Action	
That Trip We Took with Dad	Anca Miruna Lăzărescu	Alex Mărgineanu, Răzvan Enciu, Ovidiu Schumacher, Susanne Bormann	Comedy	Romanian-German-Hungarian-Swedish co-production
Therapie	Felix Charin	Taneshia Abt, Dominic Raacke	Thriller	
Toni Erdmann	Maren Ade	Peter Simonischek, Sandra Hüller	Comedy	
Too Hard to Handle	Laura Lackmann	Claudia Eisinger, Katja Riemann, Maren Kroymann	Comedy	a.k.a. Mängelexemplar
Trapped in Paradise	Felix Herzogenrath	Anna Loos	Thriller	a.k.a. Gefangen im Paradies
Die Truckerin	Sebastian Vigg	Annette Frier	Action	
Tschiller: Off Duty	Christian Alvart	Til Schweiger	Action Thriller	
Twice New Life	Claudia Prietzel, Peter Henning	Benno Fürmann, Heike Makatsch, Jessica Schwarz	Drama	a.k.a. Another Life Twice a.k.a. Zweimal zweites Leben
Two Lost Sheep	Sylke Enders	Andrea Sawatzki, Franz Hartwig	Comedy	
Two People Meeting	Ulrike von Ribbeck	Nicolette Krebitz, Clemens Schick	Drama	a.k.a. Treffen sich zwei
Über Barbarossaplatz	Jan Bonny	Bibiana Beglau, Franziska Hartmann, Joachim Król	Drama	
UFO: It Is Here	Daniele Grieco	Laura Berlin, Dennis Mojen	Horror, Science fiction	
The Unheard Woman	Hans Steinbichler	Rosalie Thomass	Drama	
Unsere Zeit ist jetzt	Martin Schreier	Cro, Peri Baumeister, David Schütter, Marc Benjamin	Comedy, Music	a.k.a. Don't Believe the Hype
Verdammt verliebt auf Mallorca	Ulli Baumann	Valerie Niehaus, Stephan Luca, Uwe Ochsenknecht, Mercedes Müller, Jürgen Drews	Comedy	a.k.a. Verdammt verliebt auf Malle
The Verdict	Lars Kraume	Florian David Fitz, Martina Gedeck, Lars Eidinger, Burghart Klaußner	Drama	
Vier gegen die Bank	Wolfgang Petersen	Til Schweiger, Matthias Schweighöfer, Michael Herbig, Jan Josef Liefers, Alexandra Maria Lara	Crime comedy	a.k.a. Four Against the Bank a.k.a. 4 Against the Bank a.k.a. 4 gegen die Bank
Die vierte Gewalt	Brigitte Maria Bertele	Benno Fürmann, Franziska Weisz, Oliver Masucci, Jördis Triebel, Ulrich Matthes, Devid Striesow, Victoria Trauttmansdorff	Drama	a.k.a. The Fourth Estate a.k.a. The 4th Estate
Volltreffer	Granz Henman	Julia Hartmann, Axel Stein, Tom Gerhardt	Comedy	
Volt	Tarek Ehlail	Benno Fürmann, Ayo, Sascha Alexander Geršak, Kida Khodr Ramadan, Stipe Erceg, Denis Moschitto, Anna Bederke, André Hennicke	Science fiction	
Was kostet die Liebe? – Ein Großstadtmärchen	Florian Knittel	Mira Bartuschek, Birte Glang, Alexander Khuon	Comedy	
We Are the Rosinskis	David Gruschka	Anna Thalbach, Milan Peschel, Katharina Thalbach, Emma Bading	Comedy	a.k.a. We're the Rosinskis
We Are the Tide	Sebastian Hilger	Max Mauff, Lana Cooper	Science fiction	
Welcome to Germany	Simon Verhoeven	Senta Berger, Heiner Lauterbach, Eric Kabongo, Elyas M'Barek, Palina Rojinski, Florian David Fitz	Comedy	a.k.a. Willkommen bei den Hartmanns
Wer aufgibt ist tot	Stephan Wagner	Bjarne Mädel, Friederike Kempter, Katharina Marie Schubert	Drama	
A Westerly Wind with Sudden Squalls	Dirk Regel	Ann-Kathrin Kramer, Rhea Harder, Hannes Jaenicke, Sky du Mont, Lisa Kreuzer	Comedy	a.k.a. Wind from the West with Strong Gusts
What's Left of My Life	Jens Wischnewski	Christoph Letkowski, Luise Heyer, Karoline Bär, Ulrike Kriener	Drama	a.k.a. Die Reste meines Lebens
The White Rabbit	Florian Schwarz	Lena Urzendowsky, Devid Striesow, Louis Hofmann	Thriller	
Wild	Nicolette Krebitz	Lilith Stangenberg, Georg Friedrich	Drama	
Wunderlich's World	Dani Levy	Katharina Schüttler, Peter Simonischek, Christiane Paul, Hannelore Elsner	Comedy, Music	German-Swiss co-production
Young Light	Adolf Winkelmann	Oscar Brose, Charly Hübner, Peter Lohmeyer	Drama	
Your Children	Marco Kreuzpaintner	Marleen Lohse, Fabian Busch, Matthias Brandt, Manfred Zapatka	Thriller	a.k.a. Sanft schläft der Tod
Zazy	Matthias X. Oberg	Ruby O. Fee, Paul Boche, Petra Hultgren, Philippe Brenninkmeyer	Thriller	German-Italian co-production
Zwei Leben. Eine Hoffnung.	Richard Huber	Annette Frier, Valentino Fortuzzi, Barbara Prakopenka	Drama	

== 2017 ==
Title	Director	Cast	Genre	Notes
2 Sturköpfe im Dreivierteltakt	Thomas Kronthaler	Herbert Knaup, Uwe Ochsenknecht	Comedy, Music	a.k.a. Zwei Sturköpfe im Dreivierteltakt a.k.a. Zwei Sturköpfe im ¾ Takt
The 7th Day	Roland Suso Richter	Stefanie Stappenbeck, Henning Baum, Josefine Preuß, Katharina Schüttler	Thriller	a.k.a. The Seventh Day
55 Steps	Bille August	Helena Bonham Carter, Hilary Swank	Drama	German-Belgian co-production
Abi '97 – gefühlt wie damals	Granz Henman	Diana Amft, Axel Stein, Rick Kavanian, Jana Pallaske, Tom Beck	Comedy	Remake of The Immature (2011)
Alien Invasion: S.U.M.1	Christian Pasquariello	Iwan Rheon, André Hennicke	Science fiction	
Allmen and the Dragonflies	Thomas Berger	Heino Ferch, Andrea Osvárt, Ben Becker, Hanns Zischler, Peter Kurth, Samuel Finzi	Crime	a.k.a. Allmen and the Secret of the Dragonflies
Am Abend aller Tage	Dominik Graf	Friedrich Mücke, Ernst Jacobi, Victoria Sordo	Drama	a.k.a. Twilight Eternal
Arthur & Claire	Miguel Alexandre	Josef Hader, Hannah Hoekstra	Drama	a.k.a. Arthur and Claire a.k.a. Arthur und Claire
At the Helm	Stephan Wagner	Julia Koschitz, Wotan Wilke Möhring	Crime	a.k.a. Am Ruder
Atempause	Aelrun Goette	Katharina Marie Schubert, Carlo Ljubek	Drama	
Auf der anderen Seite ist das Gras viel grüner	Pepe Danquart	Jessica Schwarz, Felix Klare, Christoph Letkowski	Comedy, Fantasy	
Axolotl Overkill	Helene Hegemann	Jasna Fritzi Bauer, Arly Jover, Mavie Hörbiger, Laura Tonke	Drama	
Back for Good	Mia Spengler	Kim Riedle, Juliane Köhler, Leonie Wesselow	Drama	
Bedbugs	Jan Henrik Stahlberg	Franz Rogowski, Jan Henrik Stahlberg	Drama	a.k.a. Fikkefuchs
The Beginner	Alexandra Sell	Ulrike Krumbiegel, Annekathrin Bürger, Christine Errath	Drama, Sport	a.k.a. Die Anfängerin
Berlin Falling	Ken Duken	Tom Wlaschiha, Ken Duken	Thriller	
The Best of All Worlds	Adrian Goiginger	Verena Altenberger, Jeremy Miliker	Drama	Austrian-German co-production
Beuys	Andres Veiel		Documentary	
Boarding-School Intrigue	Torsten C. Fischer	Nadja Uhl, Hanno Koffler, Joachim Król	Thriller	a.k.a. The Missing Girl & Twilight Worlds a.k.a. Tod im Internat
Brandnächte	Matti Geschonneck	Sophie von Kessel, Tobias Moretti, Barbara Auer	Crime	a.k.a. Blazing Nights
Eine Braut kommt selten allein	Buket Alakuş	Sido, Michelle Barthel	Comedy	
Break-Out to the Unknown	Kai Wessel	Fabian Busch, Maria Simon	Science fiction	German-South African co-production
Bright Nights	Thomas Arslan	Georg Friedrich, Tristan Göbel	Drama	
Brüder	Züli Aladağ	Edin Hasanović	Thriller	a.k.a. Brothers
Bruder – Schwarze Macht	Randa Chahoud	Sibel Kekilli, Yasin Boynuince, Tim Seyfi, Friedrich Mücke, Bjarne Mädel	Thriller	a.k.a. Brother: Dark Threat
Bullyparade: The Movie	Michael Herbig	Michael Herbig, Christian Tramitz, Rick Kavanian	Comedy, Anthology	
Bye Bye Germany	Sam Garbarski	Moritz Bleibtreu, Antje Traue	War	a.k.a. Es war einmal in Deutschland. Belgian-German-Luxembourgish co-production
The Cakemaker	Ofir Raul Graizer	Tim Kalkhof, Sarah Adler, Roi Miller	Drama	Israeli-German co-production
The Captain	Robert Schwentke	Max Hubacher, Milan Peschel, Frederick Lau	War	a.k.a. Der Hauptmann
Casting	Nicolas Wackerbarth	Andreas Lust, Judith Engel, Corinna Kirchhoff	Comedy	
Cold Hell	Stefan Ruzowitzky	Violetta Schurawlow, Tobias Moretti, Sammy Sheik, Friedrich von Thun	Thriller	Austrian-German co-production
Cold Water	Raymond Ley	Maria-Victoria Dragus, Mirosław Baka	Drama	a.k.a. Tod einer Kadettin
Dark Blue Girl	Mascha Schilinski	Helena Zengel, Karsten Mielke, Artemis Chalkidou	Drama	a.k.a. Die Tochter
Detour	Nina Vukovic	Lars Rudolph, Luise Heyer, Àlex Brendemühl	Thriller	
Das deutsche Kind	Umut Dağ	Murathan Muslu, Neshe Demir, Katrin Sass	Drama	a.k.a. The German Child
Different Kinds of Rain	Isabel Prahl	Bjarne Mädel, Bibiana Beglau, Emma Bading	Drama	a.k.a. 1000 Arten Regen zu beschreiben
Do You Sometimes Feel Burned Out and Empty?	Lola Randl	Lina Beckmann, Charly Hübner, Benno Fürmann	Comedy, Fantasy	a.k.a. Fühlen Sie sich manchmal ausgebrannt und leer?
Don't Worry, I'm Fine	Emily Atef	Jörg Schüttauf, Ulrike C. Tscharre, Leonard Carow, Leonard Scheicher	Thriller	a.k.a. Macht euch keine Sorgen!
Double Room	Isabel Kleefeld	Anja Kling, Carol Schuler	Comedy	a.k.a. Zweibettzimmer
Drift	Helena Wittmann	Theresa George, Josefina Gill	Drama	
East Frisian Killer	Sven Bohse	Christiane Paul, Peter Heinrich Brix, Uwe Bohm, Svenja Jung, Barnaby Metschurat	Thriller	
End of the Season	Lars Henning	Peter Kurth, Karl Markovics, Catrin Striebeck	Crime	a.k.a. Zwischen den Jahren
Fack ju Göhte 3	Bora Dağtekin	Elyas M'Barek, Jella Haase, Sandra Hüller, Katja Riemann, Uschi Glas	Comedy	a.k.a. Suck Me Shakespeer 3
Familie ist kein Wunschkonzert	Sebastian Hilger	Gro Swantje Kohlhof, Claudia Eisinger, Karin Hanczewski, Steffi Kühnert	Comedy	
Familie mit Hindernissen	Oliver Schmitz	Nicolette Krebitz, Hary Prinz, Jürgen Maurer, Franziska Weisz	Comedy	German-Austrian co-production
Fear: The Enemy Downstairs	Thomas Berger	Heino Ferch, Anja Kling, Udo Samel, Lena Stolze, Dietrich Hollinderbäumer	Thriller	a.k.a. Angst – Der Feind in meinem Haus
The Final Journey	Nick Baker-Monteys	Jürgen Prochnow, Petra Schmidt-Schaller, Tambet Tuisk, Suzanne von Borsody	Drama	a.k.a. Leanders letzte Reise
For Emma & Ever	Doron Wisotzky	Nadja Becker, Pasquale Aleardi, Max von Thun, Inez Bjørg David	Comedy	a.k.a. For Emma and Ever a.k.a. Für Emma und ewig
Forget About Nick	Margarethe von Trotta	Ingrid Bolsø Berdal, Katja Riemann, Haluk Bilginer	Comedy	
Forwards Ever!	Francis Meletzky	Jörg Schüttauf, Josefine Preuß, Jacob Matschenz	Comedy	a.k.a. Vorwärts immer!
Freedom	Jan Speckenbach	Johanna Wokalek, Hans-Jochen Wagner	Drama	a.k.a. Freiheit
Für dich dreh ich die Zeit zurück	Nils Willbrandt	Gisela Schneeberger, Erwin Steinhauer, Ella Rumpf, Simon Schwarz	Drama	German-Austrian co-production
The Garden	Sonja Maria Kröner	Laura Tonke, Mavie Hörbiger, Ursula Werner, Günther Maria Halmer, Thomas Loibl	Drama	a.k.a. Sommerhäuser
Gift	Daniel Harrich	Heiner Lauterbach, Julia Koschitz, Maria Furtwängler, Arfi Lamba, Luise Heyer, Ulrich Matthes, Rajesh Khattar, Francis Fulton-Smith	Drama	
Godless Youth	Alain Gsponer	Jannis Niewöhner, Fahri Yardım, Emilia Schüle, Alicia von Rittberg, Jannik Schümann, Iris Berben	Science fiction	a.k.a. The Age of the Fish
Gods in White	Elmar Fischer	Claudia Michelsen, Anneke Kim Sarnau, Sebastian Rudolph, Antonio Wannek	Drama	
A Good Mother	Claudia Garde	Petra Schmidt-Schaller, Mina Tander, Judy Winter, Axel Milberg, Jenny Elvers	Thriller	
Der Gutachter – Ein Mord zu viel	Christiane Balthasar	Benjamin Sadler, Jasmin Gerat, Sesede Terziyan, Hanns Zischler	Crime	a.k.a. The Expert Witness: A Murder Too Many
Der gute Bulle	Lars Becker	Armin Rohde, Axel Prahl, Melika Foroutan, Max Simonischek, Gaby Dohm, Thomas Heinze	Crime	a.k.a. The Good Cop
Gutland	Govinda Van Maele	Frederick Lau, Vicky Krieps	Drama	Luxembourgian-German-Belgian co-production
Happy Burnout	André Erkau	Wotan Wilke Möhring	Comedy	
Harry's Island	Anna Justice	Wolfgang Stumph, Katrin Sass	Drama	
Hausbau mit Hindernissen	Till Franzen	Katharina Schüttler, Hans Löw, Angela Winkler	Comedy	
High Society	Anika Decker	Emilia Schüle, Jannis Niewöhner, Iris Berben, Katja Riemann	Comedy	
Hit Mom: Murderous Christmas	Sebastian Marka	Anneke Kim Sarnau, Jürgen Tarrach	Black comedy	
Human Flow	Ai Weiwei		Documentary	
Hush Little Baby	Andreas Senn	Roeland Wiesnekker, Anja Kling, Silke Bodenbender	Thriller	a.k.a. A Murder Of Crows: Hush Little Baby
I Will Not Be Silent	Esther Gronenborn	Nadja Uhl	Drama	a.k.a. I Won't Keep Silent a.k.a. Ich werde nicht schweigen
Iceman	Felix Randau	Jürgen Vogel, Franco Nero	Adventure	a.k.a. Der Mann aus dem Eis
Ich war eine glückliche Frau	Martin Enlen	Petra Schmidt-Schaller, Rainer Bock, Imogen Kogge, Marc Hosemann	Drama	
Immigration Game	Krystof Zlatnik	Mathis Landwehr, Denise Owono	Action thriller drama	
In the Fade	Fatih Akin	Diane Kruger	Drama	a.k.a. Aus dem Nichts
In Times of Fading Light	Matti Geschonneck	Bruno Ganz	Drama	
The Invisibles	Claus Räfle	Max Mauff, Alice Dwyer, Ruby O. Fee, Aaron Altaras, Florian Lukas, Andreas Schmidt	War	
It's Your Turn, Honey!	Sven Unterwaldt	Carolin Kebekus, Maxim Mehmet, Axel Stein, Jasmin Schwiers, Ludger Pistor	Comedy	a.k.a. Schatz, nimm Du sie! Remake of Daddy or Mommy (2015)
Jella and The Pursuit of Happiness	Enno Reese	Maren Kroymann, Rudolf Kowalski, Valerie Niehaus, Oliver Wnuk	Comedy	a.k.a. Jella jagt das Glück
Jetzt.Nicht.	Julia Keller	Godehard Giese	Drama	a.k.a. Not.Now.
Kalt ist die Angst	Berno Kürten	Caroline Peters, Christoph Maria Herbst, Rudolf Kowalski	Thriller	
Karl Marx City	Michael Tucker, Petra Epperlein		Documentary	
Keine zweite Chance	Alexander Dierbach	Petra Schmidt-Schaller, Sebastian Bezzel, Josefine Preuß, Hanns Zischler, Inez Bjørg David, André Szymanski, Murathan Muslu	Thriller	a.k.a. No Second Chance. Remake of Une chance de trop (2015)
Die Ketzerbraut	Hansjörg Thurn	Ruby O. Fee, Christoph Letkowski, Paulus Manker, Christoph M. Ohrt	Drama, Adventure	a.k.a. The Heretic Bride. German-Austrian-Czech co-production
Kilimandscharo – Reise ins Leben	Gregor Schnitzler	Anna Maria Mühe, Kostja Ullmann, Bongo Mbutuma, Simon Schwarz	Drama	
Ein Kind wird gesucht	Urs Egger	Heino Ferch, Silke Bodenbender, Johann von Bülow	Crime	
King of Berlin	Lars Kraume	Florian Lukas, Anna Fischer, Marc Hosemann	Crime comedy	
Die Konfirmation	Stefan Krohmer	Ulrike C. Tscharre, Ben Braun, Christina Große, Reiner Schöne	Comedy	
Krieg	Rick Ostermann	Ulrich Matthes	Thriller	a.k.a. Fremder Feind
The Last Trace	Andreas Herzog	Jasmin Gerat, Barry Atsma, Rainer Bock, Vladimir Burlakov, William Houston, Sarah Quintrell, Mark Frost, Richard Cunningham, Neil Bell, Helen Longworth, Alexandra Moen	Thriller	a.k.a. The Last Track
The Life After	Nicole Weegmann	Jella Haase, Carlo Ljubek, Martin Brambach, Christina Große, Jeremias Meyer	Drama	a.k.a. Das Leben danach
The Little Vampire 3D	Richard Claus, Karsten Kiilerich	—N/a	Animated film	German-Danish-Dutch co-production
Lommbock	Christian Zübert	Moritz Bleibtreu, Lucas Gregorowicz	Comedy	
LOMO – The Language of Many Others	Julia Langhof	Jonas Dassler, Lucie Hollmann, Marie-Lou Sellem, Peter Jordan	Drama	
Lonely Knights	Lars Jessen	Heinz Strunk, Friederike Kempter, Charly Hübner, Peter Heinrich Brix	Comedy	a.k.a. Jürgen: We Only Live Once
The Long Summer of Theory	Irene von Alberti	Julia Zange, Katja Weilandt, Martina Schöne-Radunski	Drama	
Love Is in the Air	André Erkau	Jasmin Gerat, Jasmin Schwiers, Oliver Mommsen	Comedy	
Loverboy	Thomas Durchschlag	Anna Bachmann, Samy Abdel Fattah	Crime drama	a.k.a. Ich gehöre ihm
Lovin' Amsterdam	Florian Froschmayer	Vladimir Burlakov, Bracha van Doesburgh	Comedy	a.k.a. Verliebt in Amsterdam
Lucky Loser – Ein Sommer in der Bredouille	Nico Sommer	Peter Trabner, Annette Frier, Emma Bading, Elvis Clausen, Kai Wiesinger	Comedy	
Luna	Khaled Kaissar	Lisa Vicari, Carlo Ljubek	Thriller	a.k.a. Luna's Revenge
Luther and I	Julia von Heinz	Karoline Schuch, Devid Striesow	Biography	a.k.a. Katharina Luther
Das Luther-Tribunal	Christian Twente	Roman Knižka, Alexander Beyer	History, Docudrama	a.k.a. Das Luther-Tribunal – Zehn Tage im April
Mademoiselle Paradis	Barbara Albert	Maria-Victoria Dragus, Devid Striesow	Drama, Music	a.k.a. Licht. Austrian-German co-production
Magical Mystery or: The Return of Karl Schmidt	Arne Feldhusen	Charly Hübner, Detlev Buck, Marc Hosemann, Annika Meier, Bjarne Mädel	Comedy, Music	
Mata Hari – Tanz mit dem Tod	Kai Christiansen	Natalia Wörner, Nora Waldstätten, Vladimir Burlakov, Francis Fulton-Smith	Biography, Spy, War	a.k.a. Mata Hari: Dance with Death
Maze	Stephen Burke	Tom Vaughan-Lawlor, Barry Ward	Crime drama	British-German-Irish-Swedish co-production
Meine fremde Freundin	Stefan Krohmer	Ursula Strauss, Valerie Niehaus, Hannes Jaenicke	Drama	
The Milan Protocol	Peter Ott	Catrin Striebeck	Thriller, War	
Mission: Love	Laura Lackmann	Laura Tonke, Marc Hosemann	Comedy	a.k.a. Zwei im falschen Film
Monster Family	Holger Tappe	—N/a	Animated film	a.k.a. Happy Family. British-German co-production
Mountain Miracle	Tobias Wiemann	Mia Kasalo, Samuel Girardi, Susanne Bormann, Denis Moschitto, Jasmin Tabatabai	Drama	a.k.a. Amelie rennt
My Blind Date With Life	Marc Rothemund	Kostja Ullmann, Jacob Matschenz, Anna Maria Mühe	Comedy	
My Brother Simple	Markus Goller	David Kross, Frederick Lau, Emilia Schüle	Drama	a.k.a. Simpel
Nackt. Das Netz vergisst nie.	Jan Martin Scharf	Felicitas Woll, Aleen Jana Kötter	Thriller	a.k.a. Naked: The Net Never Forgets
The Nameless Day	Volker Schlöndorff	Thomas Thieme, Devid Striesow, Ursina Lardi	Crime	
Das Nebelhaus	Claudia Garde	Felicitas Woll, Hyun Wanner, Lucas Prisor, Jasmin Schwiers, Nadeshda Brennicke	Crime	
Die Notlüge	Marie Kreutzer	Josef Hader, Brigitte Hobmeier, Pia Hierzegger, Andreas Kiendl, Christine Ostermayer	Comedy	Austrian-German co-production
Old Agent Men	Robert Thalheim	Henry Hübchen, Jürgen Prochnow, Antje Traue, Michael Gwisdek, Thomas Thieme, Winfried Glatzeder	Comedy	a.k.a. Kundschafter des Friedens
Only God Can Judge Me	Özgür Yıldırım	Moritz Bleibtreu, Edin Hasanović, Birgit Minichmayr, Kida Khodr Ramadan	Crime	
Out of Control	Axel Sand, Richard Lin	Cecilia Cheung, T.O.P, Michael Trevino	Action thriller	Chinese-German co-production
Parents Are the Better Liars	Maria von Heland	Silke Bodenbender, Tom Wlaschiha, Nina Petri	Comedy	a.k.a. Eltern und andere Wahrheiten
Plug Nickels	Matthias Kiefersauer	Sebastian Bezzel, Fred Stillkrauth	Comedy	a.k.a. Falsche Siebziger
Pretty Far from Okay	Helena Hufnagel	Luise Heyer, Jytte-Merle Böhrnsen	Drama	a.k.a. Einmal bitte alles
Die Puppenspieler	Rainer Kaufmann	Samuel Schneider, Herbert Knaup, Ulrich Matthes, Sascha Alexander Geršak, Edin Hasanović, Rainer Bock	Drama	a.k.a. The Puppeteers
Queen of the Night	Emily Atef	Silke Bodenbender, Peter Schneider, Hary Prinz	Drama	
Rabbit School – Guardians of the Golden Egg	Ute von Münchow-Pohl	—N/a	Animated film	a.k.a. Die Häschenschule – Jagd nach dem Goldenen Ei
Rakete Perelman	Oliver Alaluukas	Liv Lisa Fries	Comedy	a.k.a. Rocket Perelman
Redemption Road	Matthias Glasner	Ronald Zehrfeld, Johanna Wokalek, Barbara Auer, Felix Klare, Ulrike Kriener, Katharina Wackernagel, Christian Berkel, Saskia Reeves, Kate Dickie, Ian McElhinney	Drama, War	a.k.a. Landgericht
Reformation	Uwe Janson	Maximilian Brückner, Armin Rohde, Rüdiger Vogler, Christoph Maria Herbst	History, Biography	a.k.a. Heaven and Hell a.k.a. Zwischen Himmel und Hölle
Regrettably Kin	Lars Jessen	Axel Prahl, Jonas Nay	Comedy	a.k.a. Vadder, Kutter, Sohn
Return to Montauk	Volker Schlöndorff	Stellan Skarsgård, Nina Hoss, Niels Arestrup	Drama	
Rewind – Die zweite Chance	Johannes F. Sievert	Àlex Brendemühl, Sylvia Hoeks, Max von Pufendorf, İdil Üner	Science fiction	
Richard the Stork	Toby Genkel, Reza Memari	—N/a	Animated film	German-American-Belgian-Norwegian-Luxembourgish co-production
Rock & Love: You Can't Tame a Rockstar	Kai Meyer-Ricks	Tom Beck, Cristina do Rego, Ilja Richter	Comedy, Music	a.k.a. Rock and Love: You Can't Tame a Rockstar a.k.a. Rockstars zähmt man nicht
Rock My Heart	Hanno Olderdissen	Lena Klenke, Dieter Hallervorden, Emilio Sakraya, Annette Frier, Milan Peschel	Family	
Romancing the Jungle	Peter Gersina	Julia Hartmann, Stephan Luca, Peter Benedict	Adventure	
Ein Schnupfen hätte auch gereicht	Christine Hartmann	Anna Schudt	Biography	
Sechs Richtige und ich	Heinz Dietz	Susan Hoecke, Hendrik Duryn, Grit Boettcher	Comedy	a.k.a. 6 Richtige und ich
Sex, Pity and Loneliness	Lars Montag	Jan Henrik Stahlberg, Friederike Kempter, Rainer Bock, Maria Hofstätter, Eva Löbau, Peter Schneider	Drama	a.k.a. Einsamkeit und Sex und Mitleid
A Smile in the Night	Jan Ruzicka	Natalia Belitski, August Wittgenstein, Cornelia Froboess, Tilo Prückner	Comedy	a.k.a. Ein Lächeln nachts um vier
Snowflake	Adolfo Kolmerer	Erkan Acar, Reza Brojerdi, Xenia Georgia Assenza, Adrian Topol, Mehmet Kurtuluş, Mathis Landwehr, Gedeon Burkhard	Action comedy	
Der Sohn	Urs Egger	Mina Tander, Nino Böhlau	Thriller	a.k.a. The Son
Sommerfest	Sönke Wortmann	Lucas Gregorowicz, Anna Bederke	Comedy	
Strange Daughter	Stephan Lacant	Elisa Schlott, Hassan Akkouch, Heike Makatsch	Drama	
Südstadt	Matti Geschonneck	Anke Engelke, Andrea Sawatzki, Julia Stemberger, Dominic Raacke, Manfred Zapatka	Drama	
Sugar Sand	Dirk Kummer	Tilman Döbler, Valentin Wessely, Katharina Marie Schubert, Christian Friedel	Drama	
Summer of '44: The Lost Generation	Friedemann Fromm	Jonathan Berlin, Theo Trebs	War	a.k.a. Die Freibadclique. German-Czech co-production
Teenosaurus Rex	Leander Haußmann	Jan Josef Liefers, Heike Makatsch, Harriet Herbig-Matten, Detlev Buck	Comedy	a.k.a. The Puberty a.k.a. Das Pubertier
Tehran Taboo	Ali Soozandeh	—N/a	Animated film	German-Austrian co-production
A Terribly Rich Couple	Neelesha Barthel	Lisa Martinek, Thomas Heinze	Comedy	
This Crazy Heart	Marc Rothemund	Elyas M'Barek, Philip Noah Schwarz	Comedy	a.k.a. Dieses bescheuerte Herz
Three Peaks	Jan Zabeil	Alexander Fehling, Bérénice Bejo	Drama	a.k.a. Drei Zinnen. German-Italian co-production
Tiger Girl	Jakob Lass	Ella Rumpf, Maria-Victoria Dragus	Drama	
Tiger Milk	Ute Wieland	Flora Thiemann, Emily Kusche, Narges Rashidi, Luna Mijović	Drama	
Too Close	Petra Katharina Wagner	Corinna Harfouch, Simon Jensen, Peter Lohmeyer	Drama	a.k.a. Viel zu nah
Toter Winkel	Stephan Lacant	Herbert Knaup, Hanno Koffler	Thriller	
Uncle Vanya	Anna Martinetz	Martin Butzke, Korinna Krauss, Julia Dietze, Manuel Rubey, Wolfgang Hübsch	Drama	a.k.a. Onkel Wanja
Under German Beds	Jan Fehse	Veronica Ferres, Heiner Lauterbach, Magdalena Boczarska	Comedy	
Under the Family Tree	Constanze Knoche	Stephanie Amarell, Godehard Giese, Claudia Geisler-Bading, Karin Hanczewski	Thriller	a.k.a. Die Familie
Vacation from Life	Sophie Allet-Coche	Hannelore Elsner, Marie Bäumer, Navíd Akhavan, Emilio Sakraya	Drama	a.k.a. Ferien vom Leben
Vacuum	Christine Repond	Barbara Auer, Robert Hunger-Bühler	Drama	Swiss-German co-production
Verräter – Tod am Meer	Francis Meletzky	Albrecht Schuch, Hannah Herzsprung	Thriller	
Wahnsinn! Nietzsche!	Hedwig Schmutte	Wanja Mues	Biography, Docudrama	
Wedding in Rome	Olaf Kreinsen	Federica Sabatini, Matthias Zera, Ricky Tognazzi, Stefania Rocca, Ann-Kathrin Kramer, Harald Krassnitzer, Elena Cotta, Annika Ernst	Comedy	German-Italian co-production
Western	Valeska Grisebach	Meinhard Neumann	Drama	German-Austrian-Bulgarian co-production
What I Know About You	Isabel Kleefeld	Thekla Carola Wied, August Zirner, Uwe Kockisch, Jasmin Schwiers	Drama	
Whatever Happens	Niels Laupert	Fahri Yardım, Sylvia Hoeks	Drama	
Willkommen bei den Honeckers	Philipp Leinemann	Martin Brambach, Johanna Gastdorf, Maximilian Meyer-Bretschneider, Cornelia Gröschel, Max Mauff	Comedy	
Winter Hunt	Astrid Schult	Michael Degen, Carolyn Genzkow, Elisabeth Degen	Thriller	a.k.a. Winterjagd
Women Walk the Walk	Matthias Tiefenbacher	Anna Maria Mühe, Max von Thun, Friedrich von Thun, Sophie von Kessel, Jean-Yves Berteloot	Comedy	a.k.a. Wenn Frauen ausziehen
The Young Karl Marx	Raoul Peck	August Diehl, Vicky Krieps, Stefan Konarske	Biography	French-German-Belgian co-production
Your Will Be Done	Till Endemann	Edgar Selge, Jannis Niewöhner, Franziska Walser	Drama	a.k.a. So auf Erden
Zaun an Zaun	Peter Gersina	Adnan Maral, Esther Schweins	Comedy	a.k.a. Picket Fences
Zwei	Ariane Zeller	Katharina Marie Schubert, Hans Löw	Drama	
Zwei Bauern und kein Land	Sibylle Tafel	Ernst Stötzner, Christoph Schechinger, Katharina Thalbach, Andreas Schmidt	Comedy	

== 2018 ==
Title	Director	Cast	Genre	Notes
3 Days in Quiberon	Emily Atef	Marie Bäumer, Robert Gwisdek, Birgit Minichmayr, Charly Hübner	Biography	a.k.a. Three Days in Quiberon
13 Uhr mittags	Martina Plura	Jörg Schüttauf, Rosalie Thomass	Thriller	a.k.a. Dreizehnuhrmittags
25 km/h	Markus Goller	Bjarne Mädel, Lars Eidinger, Sandra Hüller, Franka Potente, Alexandra Maria Lara	Comedy	
54 Hours	Kilian Riedhof	Sascha Alexander Geršak, Alexander Scheer, Albrecht Schuch, Ulrich Noethen, Martin Wuttke, August Zirner	Crime	a.k.a. 54 Hours: The Gladbeck Hostage Crisis a.k.a. Gladbeck
100 Things	Florian David Fitz	Matthias Schweighöfer, Florian David Fitz	Comedy	
303	Hans Weingartner	Mala Emde, Anton Spieker	Drama	
Die Affäre Borgward	Marcus O. Rosenmüller	Thomas Thieme, Bruno Eyron, August Zirner	Biography	
All About Me	Caroline Link	Julius Weckauf, Luise Heyer, Sönke Möhring, Joachim Król	Biography	a.k.a. Der Junge muss an die frische Luft
All Is Well	Eva Trobisch	Aenne Schwarz	Drama	
Amok	Oliver Schmitz	Franziska Weisz, Kai Schumann, Eko Fresh, Nicki von Tempelhoff, Christian Tramitz, Jörg Pose	Thriller	a.k.a. Amokspiel
As Green As It Gets	Florian Gallenberger	Elmar Wepper, Emma Bading, Ulrich Tukur	Comedy	a.k.a. Grüner wird's nicht, sagte der Gärtner und flog davon
The Aspern Papers	Julien Landais	Jonathan Rhys-Meyers, Joely Richardson, Vanessa Redgrave	Drama	British-German co-production
Asphalt Gorillas	Detlev Buck	Samuel Schneider, Jannis Niewöhner, Ella Rumpf, Stefanie Giesinger, Kida Khodr Ramadan	Crime	
The Assassination	Miguel Alexandre	Petra Schmidt-Schaller, Ulrich Tukur, Jenny Schily, Christoph Bach, Maximilian Brückner	Thriller	a.k.a. Der Mordanschlag
Atlas	David Nawrath	Rainer Bock, Albrecht Schuch	Crime	a.k.a. The Mover
Aufbruch in die Freiheit	Isabel Kleefeld	Anna Schudt, Alwara Höfels	Drama	a.k.a. Freedom's Calling a.k.a. Departure to Freedom
Balloon	Michael Herbig	David Kross, Alicia von Rittberg, Thomas Kretschmann, Karoline Schuch, Friedrich Mücke	Drama	
Beer Royal	Christiane Balthasar	Gisela Schneeberger, Lisa Maria Potthoff, Ulrike Kriener, Marianne Sägebrecht	Comedy	a.k.a. Beer Royale
Bist du glücklich?	Max Zähle	Laura Tonke. Ronald Zehrfeld	Drama	a.k.a. Are You Happy?
The Bra	Veit Helmer	Miki Manojlović, Paz Vega, Denis Lavant, Chulpan Khamatova	Comedy	a.k.a. Vom Lokführer, der die Liebe suchte. German-Azerbaijan co-production
Cheated	Andreas Linke	Peri Baumeister, Dirk Borchardt, Daniel Sträßer, Julia Brendler	Thriller	a.k.a. Die Betrogene
A Clear Felling	Max Gleschinski	Florian Bartholomäi, Bernhard Conrad, Maike Johanna Reuter	Thriller	a.k.a. Kahlschlag
Cloud Whispers	Kerstin Polte	Corinna Harfouch, Meret Becker, Sabine Timoteo	Comedy	a.k.a. Wer hat eigentlich die Liebe erfunden? German-Swiss co-production
Coconut the Little Dragon 2: Into the Jungle	Anthony Power	—N/a	Animated film	a.k.a. Der kleine Drache Kokosnuss 2 – Auf in den Dschungel!
Cold Feet	Wolfgang Groos	Heiner Lauterbach, Emilio Sakraya, Sonja Gerhardt	Comedy	
A Cold Winter's Night	Johannes Fabrick	Anton Spieker, Laura de Boer	Drama	a.k.a. Winter Heart: Death on a Cold Night
Comeback	Philipp Kadelbach	Jan Josef Liefers, Jürgen Vogel, Armin Rohde, Richy Müller, Laura Tonke, Alwara Höfels, Jeanette Hain, André Hennicke	Drama, Music	a.k.a. So viel Zeit
Country Noise	Lisa Miller	Kathi Wolf, Nadine Sauter	Drama	a.k.a. Landrauschen
Crossroads	Dominik Graf	Iris Berben, Trystan Pütter, Herbert Knaup	Drama	a.k.a. Hanne
Cut Off	Christian Alvart	Moritz Bleibtreu, Jasna Fritzi Bauer	Thriller	
Defamed	Viviane Andereggen	Rosalie Thomass, Johann von Bülow, Ulrike C. Tscharre, Verena Altenberger	Drama	a.k.a. Rufmord
Divorce for Beginners	Thorsten Schmidt	Andrea Sawatzki, Christian Berkel	Comedy	
Don't. Get. Out!	Christian Alvart	Wotan Wilke Möhring, Hannah Herzsprung, Christiane Paul, Fahri Yardim, Mavie Hörbiger	Thriller	Remake of Retribution (2015)
Down the River	Rick Ostermann	Louis Hofmann, Oliver Masucci	Drama	a.k.a. Lysis
Draußen in meinem Kopf	Eibe Maleen Krebs	Samuel Koch, Nils Hohenhövel	Drama	
A Dysfunctional Cat	Susan Gordanshekan	Pegah Ferydoni, Hadi Khanjanpour	Drama	a.k.a. Die defekte Katze
Echte Bauern singen besser	Holger Haase	Sebastian Bezzel, Susanne Bormann, Roman Knižka, Pegah Ferydoni	Comedy, Music	
Einmal Sohn, immer Sohn	Thomas Jauch	Sebastian Bezzel, Christiane Hörbiger, Mario Adorf, Julia Brendler, Jasmin Gerat, Hannes Jaenicke	Comedy	
Endlich Witwer	Pia Strietmann	Joachim Król, Anneke Kim Sarnau, Friederike Kempter	Comedy	a.k.a. Widowed at Last
Ever After	Carolina Hellsgård	Maja Lehrer, Gro Swantje Kohlhof, Trine Dyrholm	Horror	a.k.a. Endzeit
Extraklasse	Matthias Tiefenbacher	Axel Prahl, Aglaia Szyszkowitz, Mercedes Müller, Dennis Mojen, Jennifer Ulrich, Inka Friedrich, Katharina Thalbach	Comedy	
Fischer sucht Frau	Sinan Akkuş	Sebastian Fräsdorf, Cornelia Gröschel	Comedy	
For My Daughter	Stephan Lacant	Dietmar Bär	Drama, War	
Frankfurt, Dezember 17	Petra Katharina Wagner	Katja Flint, Lana Cooper, Ada Philine Stappenbeck, Christoph Luser	Crime drama	
Gefangen – Der Fall K.	Hans Steinbichler	Jan Josef Liefers, Julia Koschitz, Francis Fulton-Smith	Drama	
Germany. A Winter's Tale	Jan Bonny	Thomas Schubert, Ricarda Seifried, Jean-Luc Bubert	Crime	a.k.a. Wintermärchen
Getrieben	Maris Pfeiffer	Petra Schmidt-Schaller, Ulrike C. Tscharre	Thriller	a.k.a. Unhinged a.k.a. Driven
The Gold Diggers	André Erkau	Veronica Ferres, Dieter Hallervorden, Steffen Groth	Comedy	a.k.a. Liebe auf den ersten Trick
Gundermann	Andreas Dresen	Alexander Scheer	Biography, Music	
Happiness Sucks	Anca Miruna Lăzărescu	Ella Frey, Martin Wuttke	Drama	a.k.a. Glück ist was für Weicheier
Haunted Hospital: Heilstätten	Michael David Pate	Sonja Gerhardt, Nilam Farooq, Tim Oliver Schultz, Lisa-Marie Koroll, Emilio Sakraya	Horror	a.k.a. The Sanctuary a.k.a. Fear Challenge
Head Full of Honey	Til Schweiger	Nick Nolte, Matt Dillon, Emily Mortimer, Jacqueline Bisset, Eric Roberts	Comedy	German-American co-production
Herrliche Zeiten	Oskar Roehler	Katja Riemann, Oliver Masucci, Samuel Finzi	Comedy	a.k.a. Outmastered a.k.a. Subs
High Life	Claire Denis	Robert Pattinson, Mia Goth, Juliette Binoche, Lars Eidinger	Science fiction	British-French-German-Polish co-production
Hot Dog	Torsten Künstler	Til Schweiger, Matthias Schweighöfer	Action comedy	
How About Adolf?	Sönke Wortmann	Christoph Maria Herbst, Florian David Fitz, Iris Berben	Comedy	a.k.a. Der Vorname. Remake of What's in a Name? (2012)
How to Be Really Bad	Marco Petry	Emma Bading, Samuel Finzi, Alwara Höfels, Oliver Korittke, Axel Stein	Family	a.k.a. Meine teuflisch gute Freundin
In My Room	Ulrich Köhler	Hans Löw, Elena Radonicich	Science fiction	
In the Aisles	Thomas Stuber	Franz Rogowski, Sandra Hüller, Peter Kurth	Drama	a.k.a. In den Gängen
The Innocent	Simon Jaquemet	Judith Hofmann, Naomi Scheiber, Thomas Schuepbach	Drama	a.k.a. Der Unschuldige. Swiss-German co-production
Isy Way Out	Mark Monheim, Max Eipp	Claudia Michelsen, Milena Tscharntke, Michelangelo Fortuzzi, Hans Löw, Claudia Mehnert	Drama	a.k.a. Alles Isy
A Jar Full of Life	Florian Ross	Jella Haase, Marc Benjamin, Matthias Schweighöfer, Juliane Köhler, Uwe Ochsenknecht	Comedy	a.k.a. Vielmachglas
Jibril	Henrika Kull	Susana AbdulMajid, Malik Blumenthal	Drama	
Jim Button and Luke the Engine Driver	Dennis Gansel	Solomon Gordon, Henning Baum	Family	
The Joshua Profile	Jochen Alexander Freydank	Torben Liebrecht, Armin Rohde, Franziska Weisz, Inez Bjørg David	Thriller	
The Judge	Markus Imboden	Heino Ferch, Gesine Cukrowski, Elisa Schlott, Francis Fulton-Smith, André Jung, Sebastian Urzendowsky, Amira El Sayed	Thriller	
Kaisersturz	Christoph Röhl	Sylvester Groth, Sunnyi Melles, Christian Redl, Hubertus Hartmann	History, Docudrama	
Karl Marx – Der deutsche Prophet	Christian Twente	Mario Adorf	Biography, Docudrama	
The Keeper	Marcus H. Rosenmüller	David Kross, Freya Mavor, Julian Sands	Biography, Sport	a.k.a. Trautmann. British-German co-production
Keiner schiebt uns weg	Wolfgang Murnberger	Alwara Höfels, Imogen Kogge, Katharina Marie Schubert	Drama	
Kiss the Chef	Jurij Neumann	Diana Amft, Stephan Luca, Filip Peeters	Comedy	a.k.a. Meine Mutter ist unmöglich
Klassentreffen 1.0	Til Schweiger	Til Schweiger, Milan Peschel, Samuel Finzi	Comedy	a.k.a. Class Reunion 1.0. Remake of The Reunion (2011)
Kruso	Thomas Stuber	Jonathan Berlin, Albrecht Schuch	Drama	
The Last Berliner	Gregor Erler	Matthias Ziesing, Pegah Ferydoni, Moritz Heidelbach	Drama	a.k.a. Der letzte Mieter
Last Minute Masterpiece	Andreas Kleinert	Henry Hübchen, Patrycia Ziółkowska, Jenny Schily	Drama	a.k.a. Spätwerk
The Last Supper	Florian Frerichs	Bruno Eyron, Patrick Mölleken, Michael Degen, Adrian Topol	Drama	
Das Leben vor mir	Anna Justice	Matthias Habich, Stephan Kampwirth, Eleonore Weisgerber, Maren Eggert, Florian Panzner	Comedy	
Little Miss Dolittle	Joachim Masannek	Malu Leicher, Christoph Maria Herbst	Family	a.k.a. Liliane Susewind – Ein tierisches Abenteuer
The Little Witch	Michael Schaerer	Karoline Herfurth, Suzanne von Borsody	Family	German-Swiss co-production
Lost Ones	Felix Hassenfratz	Maria-Victoria Dragus, Enno Trebs, Clemens Schick, Anna Bachmann	Drama	a.k.a. Verlorene
Love in Persian	Florian Baxmeyer	Felix Klare, Mona Pirzad, Günther Maria Halmer	Comedy	
Luis and the Aliens	Christoph Lauenstein, Wolfgang Lauenstein	—N/a	Animated film	German-Danish-Luxembourgish co-production
Luz	Tilman Singer	Luana Velis, Jan Bluthardt, Julia Riedler, Nadja Stübiger	Horror	
Mack the Knife: Brecht's Threepenny Film	Joachim A. Lang	Lars Eidinger, Tobias Moretti, Hannah Herzsprung, Robert Stadlober, Joachim Król	Biography	
Maya the Bee: The Honey Games	Noel Cleary, Sergio Delfino, Alexs Stadermann	—N/a	Animated film	German-Australian co-production
Meeting Gorbachev	Werner Herzog, André Singer		Documentary	German-British-American co-production
Mia and the White Lion	Gilles de Maistre	Daniah De Villiers, Mélanie Laurent, Langley Kirkwood	Family	French-German-South African co-production
Missing in Berlin	Sherry Hormann	Jördis Triebel, Edin Hasanović, Florian Stetter, Nina Gummich, Natalia Wörner	Crime	a.k.a. Vermisst in Berlin
Money Drill	Niki Stein	Hans-Jochen Wagner, Nina Gnädig, Felix Eitner	Crime comedy	a.k.a. Big Manni
The Most Beautiful Couple	Sven Taddicken	Luise Heyer, Maximilian Brückner	Drama	
The Most Beautiful Girl in the World	Aron Lehmann	Aaron Hilmer, Damian Hardung, Luna Wedler, Heike Makatsch, Anke Engelke, Julia Beautx	Comedy, Music	
Mute	Duncan Jones	Alexander Skarsgård, Paul Rudd	Science fiction	British-German co-production
My Brother's Name Is Robert and He Is an Id...	Philip Gröning	Julia Zange, Josef Mattes	Drama	
Der Nesthocker	Franziska Meyer Price	Francis Fulton-Smith, Carin C. Tietze, Florentin Will	Comedy	a.k.a. The Homeboy
Never Look Away	Florian Henckel von Donnersmarck	Tom Schilling, Sebastian Koch, Paula Beer, Saskia Rosendahl	Drama	a.k.a. Werk ohne Autor
The New End	Leonel Dietsche	Sylvester Groth, Georg Friedrich, Sabine Timoteo, David Schütter, Samuel Schneider	Science fiction	a.k.a. Ende Neu
Okavango – Fremder Vater	Torsten C. Fischer	Christina Hecke, Roeland Wiesnekker, Nomsa Xaba, David Ndjavera	Drama	
One Man's Happiness	Rainer Kaufmann	Albrecht Schuch, Günther Maria Halmer, Aylin Tezel, Friedrich von Thun, Johannes Allmayer	Thriller	a.k.a. The Officer and the Girl a.k.a. Der Polizist und das Mädchen
The Other Side of Fear	Thorsten Näter	Anja Kling, Benjamin Sadler	Thriller	a.k.a. Jenseits der Angst
Our Child	Nana Neul	Susanne Wolff, Britta Hammelstein	Drama	
Passenger 23	Alexander Dierbach	Lucas Gregorowicz, Picco von Groote, Kim Riedle, Judy Winter	Thriller	
Peropero: Breakdown in Tokyo	Zoltan Paul	Zoltan Paul	Comedy, Drama, Music	German-Japanese co-production
Phantom Pain	Andreas Olenberg	Daniel Littau, Sven Martinek	Thriller	a.k.a. Phantomschmerz
Playmaker	Timon Modersohn	Frederick Lau, Antje Traue, Oliver Masucci	Crime, Sport	a.k.a. Spielmacher
Pope Francis: A Man of His Word	Wim Wenders		Documentary	German-Italian-French-Swiss co-production
The Resurrection	Niki Stein	Joachim Król, Herbert Knaup, Leslie Malton, Dominic Raacke, Mathieu Carrière	Comedy	a.k.a. Die Auferstehung
Right Here Right Now	Jakob Lass	Niklas Bruhn, David Schütter, Tinka Fürst, Martina Schöne-Radunski, Lana Cooper, Bela B, Corinna Harfouch	Comedy	a.k.a. So was von da
Rudolph, the Great	Alexander Adolph	Thomas Schmauser, Hannelore Elsner, Lena Urzendowsky, Robert Stadlober, Hanns Zischler Sunnyi Melles	Biography, Comedy	a.k.a. Der große Rudolph a.k.a. Rudolph Moshammer
Safari – Match Me If You Can	Rudi Gaul	Justus von Dohnányi, Sebastian Bezzel, Juliane Köhler, Max Mauff, Friederike Kempter, Elisa Schlott, Sunnyi Melles	Comedy	
Die Schattenfreundin	Michael Schneider	Miriam Stein, Britta Hammelstein, Golo Euler, Harald Krassnitzer	Thriller	a.k.a. A Friend in the Shadows
Schöne heile Welt	Gernot Krää	Richy Müller, N'Tarila Kouka	Drama	
Sealed Lips	Bernd Böhlich	Alexandra Maria Lara, Robert Stadlober, Stefan Kurt	Drama	a.k.a. Und der Zukunft zugewandt
Seeds of Terror	Daniel Harrich	Crispin Glover, Christiane Paul, Heiner Lauterbach, Axel Milberg, Navid Negahban, Ankita Makwana	Thriller	
Seven Hours	Christian Görlitz	Bibiana Beglau	Crime drama	a.k.a. 7 Hours a.k.a. Sieben Stunden
Shadow Ground	Dror Zahavi	Josefine Preuß, Steve Windolf, Oliver Stokowski	Thriller	a.k.a. Schattengrund – Ein Harz-Thriller
Shillings from Heaven	Urs Egger	Karl Markovics, Verena Altenberger, August Zirner	Drama	a.k.a. Das Wunder von Wörgl. Austrian-German co-production
The Silent Revolution	Lars Kraume	Leonard Scheicher, Tom Gramenz, Lena Klenke	Drama	a.k.a. Das schweigende Klassenzimmer
So weit das Meer	Axel Barth	Uwe Kockisch, Suzanne von Borsody, Imogen Kogge, Katharina Schüttler	Drama	a.k.a. As Wide as the Sea: A Coastal Thriller
Spy Cat	Christoph Lauenstein, Wolfgang Lauenstein	—N/a	Animated film	a.k.a. Marnie's World a.k.a. Die sagenhaften Vier. German-Belgian co-production
Der Staatsfeind	Felix Herzogenrath	Henning Baum, Franziska Weisz, Manfred Zapatka	Thriller	
Styx	Wolfgang Fischer	Susanne Wolff, Gedion Wekesa Oduor	Drama	German-Austrian co-production
Sylt, of All Places	Susanna Salonen	Katja Studt, Fabian Busch	Comedy	a.k.a. Ausgerechnet Sylt
Tabaluga	Sven Unterwaldt	—N/a	Animated film	a.k.a. The Ice Princess a.k.a. Ice Princess Lily
Teufelsmoor	Brigitte Maria Bertele	Silke Bodenbender, Bibiana Beglau	Thriller	
The Time of My Life	Jophi Ries	Julia-Maria Köhler, Steve Windolf, Anatole Taubman, Hanns Zischler, Beatrice Richter, Wayne Carpendale	Comedy	a.k.a. Ein Moment fürs Leben
The Tobacconist	Nikolaus Leytner	Bruno Ganz, Simon Morzé	Drama	a.k.a. Der Trafikant. Austrian-German co-production
Tödliches Comeback	Hermine Huntgeburth	Ben Münchow, Elisa Schlott, Martin Brambach, Jeanette Hain	Crime comedy, Music	a.k.a. Deadly Comeback
Toulouse	Michael Sturminger	Matthias Brandt, Catrin Striebeck	Drama	
Transit	Christian Petzold	Franz Rogowski, Paula Beer	Drama	
Two Men in Suits	Josef Bierbichler	Josef Bierbichler, Martina Gedeck, Irm Hermann	Drama	a.k.a. Zwei Herren im Anzug
Unschuldig	Nicolai Rohde	Felix Klare, Sascha Alexander Geršak, Anna Loos, Godehard Giese, Florian Panzner, Almila Bagriacik	Crime	Remake of Innocent, Series 1 (2018)
Unterwerfung	Titus Selge	Edgar Selge, Matthias Brandt, Alina Levshin	Science fiction	a.k.a. Submission
Unzertrennlich nach Verona	Andreas Herzog	Heiner Lauterbach, Veronica Ferres	Comedy	
Wach	Kim Frank	Jana McKinnon, Alli Neumann	Drama	
Wackersdorf: Be Alert, Courageous and Solidaric	Oliver Haffner	Johannes Zeiler, Anna Maria Sturm, Fabian Hinrichs, August Zirner	Drama	
What Doesn't Kill Us	Sandra Nettelbeck	August Zirner, Johanna ter Steege, Barbara Auer, Christian Berkel, Mark Waschke, Bjarne Mädel, Peter Lohmeyer	Drama	
Whatever Happens Next	Julian Pörksen	Sebastian Rudolph, Lilith Stangenberg	Drama	
Wir lieben das Leben	Sherry Hormann	Petra Schmidt-Schaller, Günther Maria Halmer	Comedy	
Wir sind doch Schwestern	Till Endemann	Jutta Speidel, Hildegard Schmahl, Gertrud Roll, Benjamin Sadler	Drama	
Wuff	Detlev Buck	Emily Cox, Kostja Ullmann, Johanna Wokalek, Frederick Lau, Katharina Thalbach, Judy Winter	Comedy	
Der Wunschzettel	Marc Rensing	Anne Schäfer, Sebastian Ströbel, Lena Stolze	Comedy	
You Are Not Alone	Johannes Fabrick	Sophie von Kessel, Marcus Mittermeier, Matthias Koeberlin, Fritz Karl	Thriller	
A Young Man With High Potential	Linus de Paoli	Adam Ild Rohweder, Pit Bukowski, Amanda Plummer	Thriller	

== 2019 ==
Title	Director	Cast	Genre	Notes
800 Times Lonely: One Day with German Filmmaker Edgar Reitz	Anna Hepp	Edgar Reitz	Documentary	a.k.a. Eight Hundred Times Lonely
1989: A Spy Story	Sven Bohse	Petra Schmidt-Schaller, Ulrich Thomsen	Spy thriller	a.k.a. Wendezeit
7500	Patrick Vollrath	Joseph Gordon-Levitt	Thriller	German-Austrian-American co-production
Abikalypse	Adolfo Kolmerer	Lea van Acken, Jerry Hoffmann, Lucas Reiber, Reza Brojerdi	Comedy	
The Aftermath	James Kent	Keira Knightley, Alexander Skarsgård, Jason Clarke	Drama	American-British-German co-production
All I Never Wanted	Annika Blendl, Leonie Stade	Lida Freudenreich, Mareile Blendl	Drama	
All My Loving	Edward Berger	Lars Eidinger, Nele Mueller-Stöfen, Hans Löw	Drama	
Almost Perfect Love	Sinan Akkuş	Katharina Schüttler, Aleksandar Jovanovic, Manfred Zapatka	Comedy	a.k.a. Fast perfekt verliebt
Alte Bande	Kaspar Heidelbach, Dirk Kummer	Mario Adorf, Tilo Prückner	Crime comedy	
Aren't You Happy?	Susanne Heinrich	Marie Rathscheck	Comedy	a.k.a. Das melancholische Mädchen
The Audition	Ina Weisse	Nina Hoss, Simon Abkarian, Jens Albinus, Ilja Monti	Drama, Music	
Auerhaus	Neele Vollmar	Devrim Lingnau, Damian Hardung, Luna Wedler, Max von der Groeben	Drama	
Der Auftrag	Florian Baxmeyer	Anna Bederke, Oliver Masucci, Aaron Hilmer, Anja Kling, Michael Mendl, Jenny Schily	Thriller	
An August Weekend	Esther Gronenborn	Nadja Uhl, Carlo Ljubek	Drama	a.k.a. Ein Wochenende im August
Aus Haut und Knochen	Christina Schiewe	Lisa-Marie Koroll, Anja Kling, Oliver Mommsen	Drama	
Balancing Act	Vivian Naefe	Julia Koschitz, Franziska Weisz, David Rott	Drama	German-Austrian co-production
Bauhaus	Gregor Schnitzler	Alicia von Rittberg, Noah Saavedra, Jörg Hartmann, Christoph Letkowski	Drama	a.k.a. Lotte am Bauhaus
Bayala: A Magical Adventure	Aina Järvine	—N/a	Animated film	German-Luxembourgish co-production
Because You're Mine	Alexander Dierbach	Felix Klare, Julia Koschitz	Drama	a.k.a. Weil du mir gehörst
Before We Grow Old	Thomas Moritz Helm	Tala Gouveia, Paula Knüpling, Maximilian Hildebrandt	Drama	a.k.a. Heute oder morgen
Befriending the Grouch	Marco Petry	Dieter Hallervorden, Alwara Höfels, Ursela Monn	Comedy	a.k.a. Grumpy Olaf a.k.a. Mein Freund, das Ekel
Benjamin the Elephant	Tim Trachte	Manuel Santos, Dieter Hallervorden, Heike Makatsch, Tim Oliver Schultz, Friedrich von Thun, Uwe Ochsenknecht	Family	a.k.a. Benjamin Blümchen
Berlin, I Love You	Dani Levy, Til Schweiger, Dennis Gansel, Josef Rusnak, Dianna Agron, Peter Chelsom, Massy Tadjedin, Fernando Eimbcke, Justin Franklin, Daniel Lwowski, Gabriela Tscherniak	Helen Mirren, Keira Knightley, Mickey Rourke, Sibel Kekilli, Hannelore Elsner, Veronica Ferres	Anthology	American-German co-production
Birds of a Feather	Andrea Block, Christian Haas	—N/a	Animated film	a.k.a. Manou the Swift
A Bitter Pill	Isabel Prahl	Stephan Kampwirth, Nina Kronjäger, Thomas Heinze	Drama	a.k.a. Was wir wussten – Risiko Pille
Blame Game	Philipp Leinemann	Ronald Zehrfeld, Alexander Fehling, Axel Prahl, Claudia Michelsen, Antje Traue	Spy thriller	a.k.a. Das Ende der Wahrheit
Blutapfel	Markus Imboden	Milan Peschel	Crime	a.k.a. An Apple Red as Blood
Bonnie & Bonnie	Ali Hakim	Emma Drogunova, Sarah Mahita	Drama	a.k.a. Bonnie and Bonnie a.k.a. Bonnie und Bonnie
Brecht	Heinrich Breloer	Tom Schilling, Burghart Klaußner, Trine Dyrholm	Biography	
Bruder Schwester Herz	Tom Sommerlatte	Karin Hanczewski, Sebastian Fräsdorf, Godehard Giese	Drama	
Camping mit Herz	Josh Broecker	Christoph M. Ohrt, Diana Amft	Comedy	
Cherry Blossoms and Demons	Doris Dörrie	Golo Euler, Aya Irizuki, Birgit Minichmayr, Floriane Daniel, Kiki Kirin	Drama	a.k.a. Cherry Blossoms & Demons
Cleo	Erik Schmitt	Marleen Lohse	Comedy	
Close to the Horizon	Tim Trachte	Jannik Schümann, Luna Wedler	Drama	a.k.a. Dem Horizont so nah
Club of the Lonely Hearts	Christine Hartmann	Hannelore Elsner, Uschi Glas, Jutta Speidel, Hansi Kraus	Drama	
The Collini Case	Marco Kreuzpaintner	Elyas M'Barek, Franco Nero, Heiner Lauterbach, Alexandra Maria Lara	Drama	
The Components of Love	Miriam Bliese	Birte Schnöink, Ole Lagerpusch, Andreas Döhler	Drama	a.k.a. Die Einzelteile der Liebe
Crescendo	Dror Zahavi	Peter Simonischek, Bibiana Beglau, Mehdi Meskar, Sabrina Amali, Daniel Donskoy	Drama, Music	
Days of the Last Snow	Lars-Gunnar Lotz	Henry Hübchen, Bjarne Mädel, Barnaby Metschurat, Mercedes Müller, Jannik Schümann	Thriller	a.k.a. The Last Days of Snow
Dein Leben gehört mir	Jochen Alexander Freydank	Josefine Preuß, Vladimir Burlakov	Thriller	
Delirium	Till Endemann	Julia Koschitz, Justus von Dohnányi	Thriller	a.k.a. Im Schatten der Angst. German-Austrian co-production
Devil's Valley	Marcus O. Rosenmüller	Hans Sigl, Marleen Lohse, Christian Redl	Thriller	a.k.a. Flucht durchs Höllental
Double Trouble and the Magical Mirror	Marcus H. Rosenmüller	Luis Vorbach	Family	a.k.a. Unheimlich perfekte Freunde
Dream Factory	Martin Schreier	Emilia Schüle, Dennis Mojen, Heiner Lauterbach, Ken Duken, Michael Gwisdek	Drama	a.k.a. Dare to Dream
Effigy: Poison and the City	Udo Flohr	Suzan Anbeh, Elisa Thiemann, Uwe Bohm	Crime, History	
Electric Girl	Ziska Riemann	Victoria Schulz	Drama	
The Elfkins – Baking a Difference	Ute von Münchow-Pohl	—N/a	Animated film	a.k.a. A Piece of Cake a.k.a. Die Heinzels – Rückkehr der Heinzelmännchen
Es bleibt in der Familie	Florian Knittel	Andrea Sawatzki, Jennifer Ulrich, Hede Beck, Helene Blechinger, Julischka Eichel, Ludmilla Euler, Matthias Faust, Janna Horstmann, Elena Jesse, Kathrin Kestler, Kim Zarah Langner, Simon Licht, Patrick Loose	Comedy	a.k.a. Todo queda en familia
Familie Wöhler auf Mallorca	David Gruschka	Michael Gwisdek, Harald Krassnitzer, Jennifer Ulrich, Lola Casamayor, Tino Mewes	Comedy	
Fatal Plan	Ed Herzog	Benjamin Sadler, Jördis Triebel, Friederike Becht, Leslie Malton, Katharina Nesytowa, Florian Lukas	Thriller	a.k.a. Ein verhängnisvoller Plan a.k.a. Tödliches Erwachen
Ein Ferienhaus auf Teneriffa	Sabine Bernardi	Anna König, Janek Rieke, Philipp Hochmair	Comedy	
Free Country	Christian Alvart	Trystan Pütter, Felix Kramer, Nora Waldstätten	Crime	Remake of Marshland (2014)
Fritzi – A Revolutionary Tale	Ralf Kukula, Matthias Bruhn	—N/a	Animated film	
Gegen die Angst	Andreas Herzog	Nadja Uhl, Sabrina Amali, Atheer Adel, Burak Yiğit	Crime	
Gents	Dirk Kummer	Tyron Ricketts, Komi Togbonou, Nyamandi Adrian, Pablo Grant, Dalila Abdallah	Comedy	a.k.a. Herren
The German Lesson	Christian Schwochow	Ulrich Noethen, Tobias Moretti, Levi Eisenblätter, Johanna Wokalek, Tom Gronau	Drama, War	a.k.a. Deutschstunde
Get Lucky	Ziska Riemann	Palina Rojinski, Luissa Cara Hansen, Jascha Baum, Bjarne Meisel, Emma-Katharina Suthe, Moritz Jahn, Benny O. Arthur, Richard Kreutz	Comedy	
The Golden Glove	Fatih Akin	Jonas Dassler	Psychological thriller	
The Goldfish	Alireza Golafshan	Tom Schilling, Jella Haase, Kida Khodr Ramadan, Axel Stein, Birgit Minichmayr	Comedy	a.k.a. Die Goldfische
A Gschicht über d'Lieb	Peter Evers	Svenja Jung, Merlin Rose	Drama	
Head Burst	Savaş Ceviz	Max Riemelt, Isabell Gerschke	Drama	a.k.a. Kopfplatzen
Heart Hunting	Elisabeth Scharang	Martina Gedeck	Drama	a.k.a. Herzjagen. Austrian-German co-production
A Hidden Life	Terrence Malick	August Diehl, Valerie Pachner, Tobias Moretti, Bruno Ganz, Jürgen Prochnow	War	American-German co-production
How I Taught Myself to Be a Child	Rupert Henning	Valentin Hagg, Karl Markovics, Sabine Timoteo, André Wilms, Udo Samel	Drama	Austrian-German co-production
I Need You	Max Färberböck	Mavie Hörbiger, Fabian Hinrichs	Drama	a.k.a. Ich brauche euch
I Was at Home, But	Angela Schanelec	Maren Eggert	Drama	
I Was, I Am, I Will Be	İlker Çatak	Anne Ratte-Polle, Oğulcan Arman Uslu, Godehard Giese	Drama	a.k.a. Es gilt das gesprochene Wort. German-French co-production
I've Never Been to New York	Philipp Stölzl	Heike Makatsch, Moritz Bleibtreu, Katharina Thalbach, Uwe Ochsenknecht	Musical	a.k.a. Ich war noch niemals in New York
Ihr letzter Wille kann mich mal!	Sinan Akkuş	Uwe Ochsenknecht, Heiner Lauterbach, Svenja Jung	Comedy	
It's Not That Easy to Die	Maria von Heland	Michael Gwisdek, Michaela May, Ursula Karven, Sandra Borgmann, Natalia Wörner	Comedy	a.k.a. So einfach stirbt man nicht
Kidnapping Stella	Thomas Sieben	Jella Haase, Clemens Schick, Max von der Groeben	Thriller	Released by Netflix. Remake of The Disappearance of Alice Creed (2009)
The Kindness of Strangers	Lone Scherfig	Andrea Riseborough, Zoe Kazan, Tahar Rahim, Bill Nighy, Caleb Landry Jones	Drama	American-British-Canadian-French-German-Swedish co-production
Eine Klasse für sich	Christine Hartmann	Hans Löw, Alwara Höfels	Comedy	
Klassentreffen	Jan Georg Schütte	Charly Hübner, Anna Schudt, Nina Kunzendorf, Kida Khodr Ramadan, Burghart Klaußner, Anja Kling, Annette Frier, Fabian Hinrichs, Jeanette Hain	Comedy	
Der König von Köln	Richard Huber	Rainer Bock, Joachim Król, Serkan Kaya, Ernst Stötzner	Comedy	a.k.a. The King of Cologne
Kroos	Manfred Oldenburg	Toni Kroos	Documentary, Sport	
Kühn hat zu tun	Ralf Huettner	Thomas Loibl, Robert Stadlober, Kim Riedle, Trystan Pütter, Oliver Stokowski	Crime	
La Palma	Erec Brehmer	Marleen Lohse, Daniel Sträßer	Comedy	
Lara	Jan-Ole Gerster	Corinna Harfouch, Tom Schilling, Rainer Bock	Drama, Music	
The Last Cop	Peter Thorwarth	Henning Baum	Action comedy	
Latte and the Magic Waterstone	Regina Welker, Nina Wels	—N/a	Animated film	German-Belgian co-production
Leberkäsjunkie	Ed Herzog	Sebastian Bezzel, Simon Schwarz, Lisa Maria Potthoff, Eisi Gulp, Sigi Zimmerschied	Crime comedy	
Leif in Concert	Christian Klandt	Luise Heyer, Tilo Prückner, Klaus Manchen, Michael Klammer, Jule Böwe, Bela B., Godehard Giese, Florian Bartholomäi, Maryam Zaree, Isabell Gerschke	Comedy, Music	a.k.a. Leif in Concert Vol. 2
Liebe verjährt nicht	Sebastian Hilger	Heino Ferch, Tanja Wedhorn	Comedy	
Limbo	Tim Dünschede	Elisa Schlott, Tilman Strauß, Martin Semmelrogge	Thriller	
Little Joe	Jessica Hausner	Emily Beecham, Ben Whishaw	Science fiction	Austrian-British-German co-production
Lost in Separation	Rainer Kaufmann	Martina Gedeck, Ulrich Tukur	Comedy	a.k.a. Und wer nimmt den Hund?
The Love Europe Project	Laura Bispuri, Charlotte Regan, Alex Schaad, Michaela Kezele, Tomasz Emil Rudzik, Aline Fischer, Sofia Georgovassili, Even Hafnor, Lisa Brooke Hansen, Sebastian Stern	Tobias Santelmann, Zrinka Cvitesic, Patrycja Durska, Marian Dziedziel, Spike Fearn, Dimitrij Schaad, Aris Servetalis, Slavko Stimac, Wojciech Mecwaldowski	Anthology	
Love Suddenly	André Erkau	Kostja Ullmann, Kim Riedle, Julia Hartmann	Comedy	a.k.a. Auf einmal war es Liebe
The Master Butcher	Uli Edel	Jonas Nay, Aylin Tezel, Leonie Benesch, Sylvester Groth	Drama	a.k.a. The Master Butchers Singing Club
A Matter of Life	Eva Wolf	Alissa Jung, Torben Liebrecht	Drama	a.k.a. Das Menschenmögliche
Meine Nachbarn mit dem dicken Hund	Ingo Rasper	Steffi Kühnert, Zoë Valks, Katharina Marie Schubert, Johanna Gastdorf	Comedy	a.k.a. My Neighbours with the Fat Dog
Mom, Her Ladyfriend and I	Mark Monheim	Katja Flint, Antje Traue, Max Riemelt, Jasna Fritzi Bauer	Comedy	a.k.a. My Mother's Girlfriend a.k.a. The Girlfriend of My Mother
Mother Bee	Felicitas Darschin	Julia Jentsch, Alexandra Helmig, Kristin Suckow	Comedy	a.k.a. Frau Mutter Tier
Ms. Stern	Anatol Schuster	Ahuva Sommerfeld	Comedy	a.k.a. Frau Stern
Music and Apocalypse	Max Linz	Sarah Ralfs, Sophie Rois, Maryam Zaree	Comedy	a.k.a. Weitermachen Sanssouci
My Daughter the Stranger	Stefan Krohmer	Mark Waschke, Wanja Mues, Hannah Schiller	Drama	a.k.a. Eine fremde Tochter
Night Swimming	Ariane Zeller	Maria Furtwängler, Tijan Marei	Comedy	a.k.a. Nachts baden
Nimm Du ihn	Michael Hofmann	Branko Samarovski, Andrea Sawatzki, Simon Schwarz, Jule Böwe, Thomas Limpinsel, Andreas Pietschmann	Comedy	
A Normal Day	Ben Verbong	Sonja Gerhardt	Crime	a.k.a. Ein ganz normaler Tag
Now or Never	Gerd Schneider	Michael Pink, Tinka Fürst	Drama	
Nur mit Dir zusammen	Stefan Bühling	Axel Prahl, Vanessa Mai	Drama	
O Beautiful Night	Xaver Böhm	Noah Saavedra, Marko Mandić, Vanessa Loibl	Fantasy, Comedy	
Ottilie von Faber-Castell – Eine mutige Frau	Claudia Garde	Kristin Suckow	Biography	
Pelican Blood	Katrin Gebbe	Nina Hoss	Drama	
The Perfect Secret	Bora Dagtekin	Elyas M'Barek, Karoline Herfurth, Jella Haase, Jessica Schwarz, Florian David Fitz	Comedy	Remake of Perfect Strangers (2016)
Pets United	Reinhard Klooss	—N/a	Animated film	British-German-Chinese co-production
The Placebo Effect	Urs Egger	Florian Stetter, Felicitas Woll, Corinna Harfouch	Drama	a.k.a. Kranke Geschäfte. German-Czech co-production
Play	Philip Koch	Emma Bading, Oliver Masucci, Victoria Mayer	Drama	
Polar	Jonas Åkerlund	Mads Mikkelsen	Action thriller	American-German-Canadian co-production. Released by Netflix
Prélude	Sabrina Sarabi	Louis Hofmann, Liv Lisa Fries, Ursina Lardi	Drama, Music	
Princess Emmy	Piet De Rycker	—N/a	Animated film	German-Belgian-British co-production
Prof. Wall im Bordell	Stefan Krohmer	Hanns Zischler, Emilia Schüle	Drama	a.k.a. Professor Wall im Bordell
Rate Your Date	David Dietl	Alicia von Rittberg, Nilam Farooq, Edin Hasanović, Marc Benjamin	Comedy	
A Regular Woman	Sherry Hormann	Almila Bagriacik	Drama	a.k.a. Nur eine Frau
Relativity	Mariko Minoguchi	Saskia Rosendahl, Julius Feldmeier, Edin Hasanović	Drama	a.k.a. Mein Ende. Dein Anfang.
Roads	Sebastian Schipper	Fionn Whitehead, Stéphane Bak	Drama	British-French-German co-production
Die Rüden	Connie Walther	Nadin Matthews, Ibrahim Al-Kalil, Konstantin-Philippe Benedikt, Ali Khalil, Marcel Andrée	Drama	
Schattenmoor	Marc Schießer	Caroline Hartig	Horror	
Schmucklos	Thomas Schwendemann	Thomas Schwendemann, Stefan Fent	Comedy	
Secret in the Mountain	Gabriela Zerhau	Fritz Karl, Brigitte Hobmeier, Harald Windisch, Philipp Hochmair, Oliver Masucci	War	a.k.a. Ein Dorf wehrt sich. Austrian-German co-production
Servus, Schwiegersohn!	Mike Marzuk	Adnan Maral	Comedy	
Silence	Erik Borner	Michael Mendl, Marianne Sägebrecht, Erik Borner, Sandra Fleckenstein	Drama	a.k.a. Stille
The Silence	John R. Leonetti	Kiernan Shipka, Stanley Tucci	Horror	American-German co-production
Silent Screams	Johannes Fabrick	Natalia Belitski, Jürgen Maurer	Drama	
The Space Between the Lines	Vanessa Jopp	Nora Tschirner, Alexander Fehling	Romance	a.k.a. Love Virtually a.k.a. Gut gegen Nordwind
Der Sportpenner	Florian Mortan	Oliver Korittke	Comedy	
Stars Above Us	Christina Ebelt	Franziska Hartmann, Claudio Magno	Drama	
The Start of Something	Thomas Berger	Ina Weisse, Jürgen Maurer, Franziska Hartmann, Hinnerk Schönemann, Gaby Dohm	Drama	a.k.a. The Beginning of Something
Stenzels Bescherung	Marc-Andreas Bochert	Herbert Knaup, Anna Fischer, Johanna Gastdorf	Comedy	
Stormy Weather	Markus Herling	Anna Schudt, Felix Klare, Mark Waschke	Drama	a.k.a. Zwischen zwei Herzen
Stunden der Entscheidung – Angela Merkel und die Flüchtlinge	Christian Twente	Heike W. Reichenwallner, Aram Arami	Docudrama	
The Summer After Graduation	Eoin Moore	Bastian Pastewka, Fabian Busch, Hans Löw	Comedy	a.k.a. The Summer After Senior Year
Sunburned	Carolina Hellsgård	Zita Gaier, Gedion Oduor Wekesa, Sabine Timoteo	Drama	German-Dutch-Polish co-production
The Sunlit Night	David Wnendt	Jenny Slate, Alex Sharp, Zach Galifianakis, Gillian Anderson	Drama	German-Norwegian-American co-production
Surviving with Nancy	Miko Zeuschner	Felix Knopp, Rebecca Rudolph, Helen Woigk	Comedy	a.k.a. Hüftkreisen mit Nancy
Sweethearts	Karoline Herfurth	Hannah Herzsprung, Karoline Herfurth, Frederick Lau, Anneke Kim Sarnau, Ronald Zehrfeld	Crime comedy	
System Crasher	Nora Fingscheidt	Helena Zengel, Albrecht Schuch	Drama	a.k.a. Systemsprenger
Tal der Skorpione	Patrick Roy Beckert	Ralf Richter, Mathieu Carrière, Martin Semmelrogge, Claude-Oliver Rudolph	Action	a.k.a. Breakdown Forest
TKKG	Robert Thalheim	Ilyes Raoul, Lorenzo Germeno, Manuel Santos, Emma-Louise Schimpf	Family	
Tomorrow We Are Free	Hossein Pourseifi	Katrin Röver, Reza Brojerdi, Zar Amir Ebrahimi	Drama	
Too Far Away	Sarah Winkenstette	Yoran Leicher, Sobhi Awad	Family	
Totgeschwiegen	Franziska Schlotterer	Claudia Michelsen, Laura Tonke, Katharina Marie Schubert, Mehdi Nebbou, Godehard Giese, Flora Thiemann	Crime	a.k.a. Deadly Silence a.k.a. Swept Under the Carpet
Trust Me	Thomas Kronthaler	Lisa Maria Potthoff, Manuel Rubey, Justus von Dohnányi	Thriller	a.k.a. Something Always Sticks a.k.a. Irgendwas bleibt immer
Truth and a Lie	Lars Becker	Natalia Wörner, Franziska Hartmann, Fritz Karl, Felix Klare, Almila Bagriacik	Crime	a.k.a. Truth or Lie
Under ConTroll: Possessed by a Monster	Eric Hordes	Eva Habermann, George Hardy	Horror comedy	a.k.a. Trolls World – Voll vertrollt!
Under the Pear Tree	Uli Edel	Julia Koschitz, Fritz Karl, Katharina Thalbach, Devid Striesow	Crime drama	a.k.a. Unterm Birnbaum
Verliebt auf Island	Nico Sommer	Ann-Kathrin Kramer, Ben Blaskovic, Ferdinand Seebacher, Julia Schäfle, Hans-Joachim Heist	Comedy	
Villa Eva	Michael Riebl	Eleonore Weisgerber, Reiner Schöne, Paul Faßnacht	Comedy	
A Voluntary Year	Ulrich Köhler, Henner Winckler	Maj-Britt Klenke, Sebastian Rudolph, Thomas Schubert	Comedy	a.k.a. Das freiwillige Jahr
The Wall Between Us	Norbert Lechner	Lea Freund, Tim Bülow, Franziska Weisz, Fritz Karl	Drama	a.k.a. Zwischen uns die Mauer
Walpurgisnacht – Die Mädchen und der Tod	Hans Steinbichler	Silke Bodenbender, Ronald Zehrfeld, Jörg Schüttauf, Godehard Giese, David Schütter, Jördis Triebel	Thriller	
We Would Be Different	Jan Bonny	Matthias Brandt, Silke Bodenbender, Manfred Zapatka, Paul Faßnacht	Thriller	a.k.a. Wir wären andere Menschen
Weihnachten im Schnee	Till Franzen	Katharina Schüttler, Ulrike Kriener, Rainer Bock, Inez Bjørg David, Anton Spieker, Carsten Bjørnlund	Drama	a.k.a. A White Family Christmas
What Might Have Been	Florian Koerner von Gustorf	Christiane Paul, Ronald Zehrfeld, Sebastian Hülk, Barnaby Metschurat	Drama	a.k.a. Was gewesen wäre
When Hitler Stole Pink Rabbit	Caroline Link	Riva Krymalowski, Oliver Masucci, Carla Juri, Justus von Dohnányi	Drama	
Whispering Waters	Thorsten Schmidt	Claudia Michelsen, Karin Hanczewski, Eleonore Weisgerber, Anna-Lena Schwing	Drama	a.k.a. Auf dem Grund
Wie gut ist deine Beziehung?	Ralf Westhoff	Friedrich Mücke, Julia Koschitz	Comedy	
You Tell Me	Michael Fetter Nathansky	Christina Große, Gisa Flake, Marc Benjamin Puch	Drama	a.k.a. Sag du es mir
