= Our Kind of Traitor =

Our Kind of Traitor may refer to:

- Our Kind of Traitor (novel), a 2010 novel by John le Carré
- Our Kind of Traitor (film), a 2016 British spy thriller film, based on the novel
