= Boris Cherniak =

Canadian magician

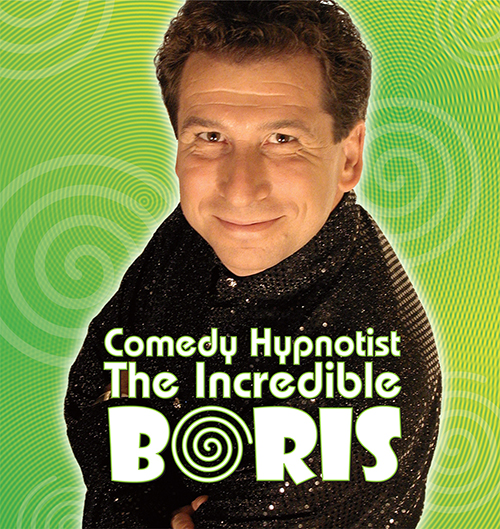
- Hypnotist The Incredible BORIS
- Born: 12 December 1964 (age 61); Moscow, Russian SFSR, Soviet Union (now Moscow, Russian Federation)
- Other names: The Incredible BORIS, The Amazing BORIS, Boris the Hypnotist
- Occupation: Hypnotist Comedian Motivational Speaker Psychological Illusionist/Mentalist Motivational
- Website: www.IncredibleBORIS.com - Comedy Hypnotist www.comedywood.com - Comedy Hypnotist www.hypnoti.ca - Motivational Speaker www.ahypnotist.com - Hypnosis Videos

Boris Cherniak (born 12 December 1964) is a Soviet-born American and Canadian based comedian hypnotist and motivational speaker, entertainer, entrepreneur and author that performs internationally.

Cherniak performs under the stage name Hypnotist The Incredible BORIS, sometimes is credited as incredible hypnotist Boris Cherniak, Boris the Hypnotist or The Amazing BORIS.

== Early life and education ==
Cherniak was born in Moscow, Russia, where he lived near the Moscow Circus, and was a regular fixture backstage. Cherniak's family emigrated to Canada when he was 10 years old. He has studied computer programming and psychology at Seneca College, University of Toronto and York University.

== Career ==
On March 10, 2008, Cherniak entertained royalty and global dignitaries at the Women as Global Leaders Conference in Dubai. His performance followed an address by Sarah, Duchess of York and Jane Fonda. Cherniak delivers a strong message of positive thinking along with a humorous performance of mind control.

In June 2011, Cherniak travelled to Kuwait, Qatar and Afghanistan to entertain the troops as part of Operation H.O.T. - Honoring Our Troops that brought food and entertainment to soldiers stationed overseas.

When Operation H.O.T. - Honoring Our Troops returned to Afghanistan and Kuwait in June 2013, Boris was once again asked to join the team along with Chef Charles Carroll, former Notre Dame football coach and ESPN commentator Lou Holtz, celebrity chef Robert Irvine, author Steve Kaplan, comedian Carmen Barton and U2 tribute band, L.A.vation.

On November 15, 2014, Boris Cherniak joined the elite team of inspiring speakers of TED with "I can do anything" Ted talk at TEDxYouth event. On October 19, 2017, Boris continued to inspire with his second talk "Your Emotional Success" Ted talk at TEDx Chatham-Kent.

Cherniak is credited as the inventor of the term "google me", having put it in an online press release on April 13, 2004. He also regularly used it on stage, to describe searching online for his web site using the popular search engine. In December 2011, Cherniak was hired by Google for their company event.

Boris Cherniak owned and operated the Comedywood comedy club chain from 1995-2005 with two locations in Toronto - uptown (Bathurst & Steeles) and downtown (Bloor & Avenue). Comedywood featured top touring comedy and variety acts.

In 2023, Boris Cherniak joined the cast of the sensational Las Vegas touring show, HYPROV, with stars of Whose Line Is It Anyway?.

In 2026, Boris appeared in a hugely popular campaign for Amazon Prime hit shows Fallout and Maxton Hall—The World Between Us, which went viral and garnered millions of views on social media.

Cherniak's television appearances showcase the powers of hypnosis via comedy skits as well as showing therapeutic effects.

== Television & Movie appearances ==
- Shirley Show
- Montel with Montel Williams
- Howie Mandel Show - 2 appearances
- regular on the Maury Povich show
- Comics!
- Out There with Melissa DiMarco
- Other TV show appearances
- The Hypnotist Incredible BORIS on The Vegas Show
- Boris Cherniak on The Robert Irvine Show - TV Guide
- Amazon Prime campaign for Fallout Season 2, where show superfans got hypnotized
- Amazon Prime campaign for Maxton Hall—The World Between Us Season 2, where show superfans got hypnotized

== Awards ==
- 2021 Best Global Trainers #20
- Best Comedy Hypnotist 2020 - Canada
- Winner 2018 APCA Hypnotist of the Year
- Winner 2017 Canadian Event Awards - Ontario / Quebec Entertainer of The Year
- Nominee 2017 Canadian Event Awards - Entertainer of The Year, Best Corporate Team Building Event
- Nominee 2017 Canadian Special Events Readers Choice Awards - Favorite Entertainment or Entertainer
- Nominee 2016 Canadian Special Events - Entertainer of The Year
- Nominee 2015 Canadian Special Events - Entertainer of The Year
- Finalist 2014 Event Solutions Star Awards Las Vegas
- Winner 2012 Entertainer of the Year
- Commendation from the City of Houston
- Winner 2009 Entertainer of the Year
- Nominee Canadian Comedy Awards
- Recipient of 2 Global Leader Awards
- Finalist 2011 Entertainer of the Year (Las Vegas)
- Nominee 2011 Entertainer of the Year (Toronto)

== Authorship ==
Cherniak has written a biographical self-help book: You Can Do Anything: A Guide to Success, Motivation, Passion and Laughter.

You Can Do Anything, published in 2016, discusses the setbacks and comebacks through a show business career, which Boris has narrated as an audiobook and released in 2022.
