= Bibi and Tina =

German radio drama series

Bibi and Tina are the main characters of the German children's radio drama series of the same name, produced by the network Kiddinx. The Bibi and Tina Riding Farm episodes are a spin-off to the Bibi Blocksberg radio series. Tina and the Martinshof first appear in episodes 43 and 44 (The Riding Farm) of Bibi Blocksberg. In episode 47 (The Horse Show) they appear once more. The radio series Bibi and Tina began subsequently in 1991. The series consists of 103 episodes, including 2 specials (As of: October 2021).

Bibi and Tina was also made into an animated series, which now includes many episodes. The more recent episodes of the series also include stories without a radio equivalent. Many of the radio episodes were additionally published as a novel.

In March 2010, the first audiobook of the series, Schatten über dem Martinshof , was published, followed in September by the second audiobook, The Hungarian Horsemen, in September 2011, Der wilde Hengst was released as the third installment in the series. In May 2019, the voice actors of the main characters performed a live radio play in front of an audience for the first time. The performed radio play "Zoff" is not included in the regular audiobook series and was written specifically for the live performance in Berlin. A sound recording of the performance was published on the official Bibi and Tina YouTube channel and on streaming services.

== Voice Actors and Casting ==
The casting of the voice actors has roughly stayed the same since the beginning of the show in 1991. The only exceptions are the castings of the narrator and Holger Martin.

In 1998, Joachim Nottke, who voiced the narrator fell ill and was unable to work. He was replaced by Ulli Herzog, the director, in the 32nd episode (Das Schmusepony) and eventually died in the same year. The episode was later revoiced by Gunter Schoß. After being recast two times, Schoß became a regular member of the cast and voiced the narrator from episode 35 onwards. The role of Holger Martin was recast three times. It is noteworthy that Holger Martin didn't actually appear in the episodes 25 to 49 and was only listed in the credits. Eberhard Prüter died unexpectedly in 2014 and was replaced by Sven Riemann as Graf Falko von Falkenstein.

Since the beginning of the show Susanne Martin has never been voiced by Evelyn Meyka, since Arianne Borbach was a better fit for the role of a young woman.

Character	Speaker
Narrator	Joachim Nottke (episodes 1–31), Otto Mellies (episode 33), Peter Hladik (episode 34), Gunter Schoß (episode 32 and from episode 35)
Bibi Blocksberg	Susanna Bonaséwicz (from episode 1)
Tina Martin	Dorette Hugo (from episode 1)
Susanne Martin	Evelyn Meyka (episodes 1–75), Arianne Borbach (episodes 76–117), Silvia Mißbach (from episode 118)
Holger Martin	Charles Rettinghaus (episodes 1–25), Matthias Hinze (episodes 49–56), Marius Clarén (from episode 57)
Count Falko von Falkenstein	Eberhard Prüter (episodes 3–80), Sven Riemann (from episode 85)
Alexander von Falkenstein	Sven Hasper (from episode 2)
Barbara Blocksberg	Hallgerd Bruckhaus (episodes 1–36)
Bernhard Blocksberg	Guido Weber (episodes 1–25)
Freddy	Oliver Rohrbeck (from episode 1)
Karla Kolumna	Gisela Fritsch (from episode 5–46)
Farmer of the Mill Yard	Gerd Holtenau (episodes 2–75), Uli Krohm (episodes 88–109), Kaspar Eichel (from episode 111)
Robert Eichhorn (veterinarian)	Martin Keßler (actor) (episodes 1–6), Dietmar Wunder (from episode 56)
Junkyard-John	Heinz Fabian (actor) (episodes 9 and 12), Horst Lampe (episodes 55–92)
Farrier Jahnke	Alexander Herzog (actor) (episodes 8, 45 and 62)
Teacher Cunibert Kraehwinkel	Jürgen Thormann (episodes 36 and 46)
Amélie	Lina Rabea Mohr (episodes 83 and 116)

== Characters ==
Bibi Blocksberg is a 13-year old blonde girl who has special skills: She is a witch. Bibi lives in Neustadt, on the outskirts of Gersthof and loves to spend her holidays on the Martinshof. She is a natural when it comes to horseback riding. During her first-ever riding lesson, Bibi already proves so much talent that she is allowed to ride her favourite horse, a challenging white mare named Sabrina. In later episodes, Sabrina becomes mother to a foal named Felix. Bibi is very self-confident, cheeky, and loves to perform magic, which is why she casts several spells in each episode even though Ms. Martin does not approve.

Tina Martin lives on the Martinshof. She loves horses but she especially loves her own horse, Amadeus, who is a brown stallion. Tina is a year older than Bibi. She has medium long, red hair. She is a not a witch but she enjoys that Bibi is able to cast spells. She is very sharp, full of ideas, and uses them to support the shenanigans that Bibi has in mind with her spells. Tina's boyfriend is Alexander von Falkenstein. Every time he is in contact with another girl or neglects Tina, she feels jealous and hurt.

Ms. Martin is Tina's mother. She lives with her children Tina and Holger at the Martinshof after her husband, Tina's and Holger's father, died in an accident. Ms. Martin is responsible for the management and finances of her farm. Her children pay for their holidays at the Martinshof.

Holger Martin is Tina's big brother and Ms. Martin's son. He is 18 years old and appears very often in the Bibi and Tina episodes. Tina and her brother often tease each other, but basically get along very well. Holger is the riding instructor at the Martinshof and is responsible for the physically demanding yard work. His stallion is called Pascal, and becomes the father of Felix in the later episodes.

Earl Falko von Falkenstein, who is leasing the Martinshof to Ms. Martin, is the owner of this farmyard. He is a very wealthy man and he owns a lot of precious horses. His favorite horse is Cleopatra, a dark Arabian mare. Even though good manners are important to him, and he often seems a bit arrogant, he is not superficial at all and he actually is of good nature. Rather, he fosters a friendship with Ms. Martin, who he went to school with, and even had a liaison with when they were younger. He does not care about her middle-class origin and income. He lives with his son Alexander at Castle Falkenstein and owns a lot of land and numerous forest areas in the surroundings. Falko von Falkenstein has a goatbeard and therefore, he bears resemblance to a billy goat. This is the reason why the billy goat of the Martinshof, called Hoheit, is named after the lord.

Alexander von Falkenstein is the Earls son and at Bibi and Tina's age. Despite his rich father he is not arrogant. Alex loves to ride, especially his black Arabian stallion Maharadscha. Alexander often finds his father's fastidious behavior annoying but still accepts him as an authority figure. He usually bows to his will and even attends boring family meetings, etc., even though he does not feel like it. Bibi and Tina find him sometimes cowardly. Alexander, who is called Alex by most, is just like the two girls an avid horse lover.

== Horses ==
The horses on Martinshof:

- Sabrina: Gray mare, ridden by Bibi
- Amadeus: Chestnut, ridden by Tina
- Pascal: Black-grey stallion, ridden by Holger
- Felix: Black-grey foal (son of Sabrina and Pascal)
- Topsy: White mare with black spots, ridden by Bibi's mother, and Bibi's father learned how to ride on her
- Max and Moritz: Brown twin ponies
- Snoopy: Piebald pony
- Nora: Bay swekbald mare
- Blu: Horse on the farm
- Babuschko: Hungarian wild horse belonging to Bibi's friend Mikosch
- Melinda: Mother of Max and Moritz
- Janosch and Mikosch: Two Hungarian wild horses that Aunt Paula bought from the Count and gifted to the Martinshof riding stable
- Knuddel: Temporary horse at the Martinshof
- Fernando: An orphan foal from Andalusia

Horses at Falkenstein Castle:

- Maharadscha: Black stallion, owned by
- Cleopatra: Arabian mare, the Count of Falkenstein's favorite horse
- Arabia: Arabian mare, the Count of Falkenstein's second horse
- Miraculus: White-grey Arabian, a talking circus horse
- Fatima: Reddish-brown foal, kept together with Felix in the pasture at the Martinshof

== Audio Drama Episodes ==
Regular Episodes

- 1 – The Foal (1991)
- 2 – Amadeus is Sick (1991)
- 3 – Dad Learns to Ride (1991)
- 4 – The Circus Pony (1991)
- 5 – The Heath Race (1991)
- 6 – The Farewell (1991)
- 7 – Tina in Danger (1992)
- 8 – The Farrier (1992)
- 9 – The Flying Saddle (1992)
- 10 – The Camping Trip (1992)
- 11 – Dad's Pony (1992)
- 12 – The Love Letter (1992)
- 13 – The Wild Horses, Part 1 (1992)
- 14 – The Wild Horses, Part 2 (1992)
- 15 – The Red Rooster (1993)
- 16 – Everyone Loves Knuddel (1993)
- 17 – The Autumn Tournament (1993)
- 18 – The Lipizzaners (1994)
- 19 – The Big Brother (1994)
- 20 – Mom Wins (1994)
- 21 – Felix Runs Away (1994)
- 22 – Mikosch Returns (1995)
- 23 – A Horse for Aunt Paula (1995)
- 24 – The Millionaire (1995)
- 25 – Christmas Celebration (1995)
- 26 – The Easter Holidays (1996)
- 27 – The Horse Birthday (1996)
- 28 – The Wild Bunch (1996)
- 29 – The Talking Horse (1997)
- 30 – A Friend for Felix (1997)
- 31 – The Veterinarian (1997)
- 32 – The Cuddly Pony (1998)
- 33 – Alex and Boarding School (1998)
- 34 – The Ghost Horse (1998)

== Film and TV adaptations ==
=== TV cartoon series ===
On July 3, 2004, the animated series Bibi and Tina was premiered on ZDF. The spin-off to the series Bibi Blocksberg contains 62 episodes, each 25 minutes long.

=== Cinema adaptations ===
On March 6, 2014, the film Bibi & Tina was released in cinemas starring Lina Larissa Strahl and Lisa-Marie Koroll in the leading roles. The movie was shot in Summer 2013 under the direction of Detlev Buck in northern Germany. The sequel Bibi & Tina: Bewildered and Bewitched (Bibi & Tina: Voll verhext) was released in cinemas on December 25 in 2014. The third movie Bibi & Tina: Girls vs. Boys (Bibi & Tina: Mädchen gegen Jungs) premiered on January 21 in 2016. Bibi & Tina: Perfect Pandemonium (Bibi & Tina: Tohuwabohu Total) is the fourth and last movie of the series premiering in 2017, with 400 thousand euros being provided by Medienboard Berlin-Brandenburg. All movies were directed by Detlev Buck.

Another feature film was announced in July 2021. In the same month, filming began with the cast of the Amazon series and a few other roles. Bibi and Tina: Simply Different was shot under the direction of Detlev Buck and released on February 17, 2022.

=== Series ===
After releasing four movies, Detlev Buck produced the Amazon Prime Series Bibi & Tina – The Series. The first season contains 10 episodes, each 20 to 25 minutes in length. Filming took place in the north of Germany starring Katharina Hirschberg as Bibi Blocksberg and Harriet Herbig-Matten as Tina Martin and has been available on Amazon Prime since the 3rd of April 2020.

== Sources ==
- Official website
- Die Zeichentrickserien
