= Freaks: You're One of Us =

2020 German film

- Film poster
- German: Freaks - Du bist eine von uns
- Directed by: Felix Binder
- Written by: Marc O. Seng
- Produced by: Maren Lüthje; Florian Schneider
- Starring: Cornelia Gröschel; Tim Oliver Schultz; Wotan Wilke Möhring
- Cinematography: Jana Lämmerer
- Edited by: Sven Müller
- Distributed by: Netflix
- Release date: 2 September 2020
- Running time: 92 minutes
- Country: Germany
- Language: German

Freaks: You're One of Us (German: Freaks – Du bist eine von uns) is a 2020 German superhero film directed by Felix Binder, written by Marc O. Seng and starring Cornelia Gröschel, Tim Oliver Schultz and Wotan Wilke Möhring. The film is a cooperation between ZDF's Das Kleines Fernsehspiel and the streaming platform Netflix.

It was released on 2 September 2020.

== Plot ==
Wendy works in a diner and lives with her husband and son in an unnamed suburb in Germany. When she meets the homeless Marek, her life changes. He advises her to stop taking the pills that her psychiatrist prescribes for her. She takes them because of an event in her childhood where she was inexplicably involved in the death of the school principal. He also says to her "You are one of us," then jumps off a highway bridge and is run over. The next evening she meets Marek again, who is unharmed. This convinces her to stop taking the pills.

When she leaves the diner after her next shift, she is attacked. She discovers her powers and hurls her attackers into the air for several meters. Then she uses her skills and threatens her boss to get a promotion. Her colleague Elmar, who also has powers, sees this.

Together they try to get to the bottom of the origin of their abilities and discover a government conspiracy. The government attempts to lock away people with abilities and drug them to suppress the forces.

== Cast ==
- Cornelia Gröschel as Wendy Schulze
- Tim Oliver Schultz as Elmar Mund
- Wotan Wilke Möhring as Marek
- Nina Kunzendorf as Dr. Stern
- Frederic Linkemann as Lars Schulze
- Finnlay Berger as Karl Schulze
- Gisa Flake as Angela
- Ralph Herforth as Gerhart
- Thelma Buabeng as Chantal

=== English dubbing ===
The English version was produced by Igloo Music in Burbank, California. Anna Fox adapted the script and Harry Buerkle directed the dub.

Role	Actor	Voice actor
Wendy Schulze	Cornelia Gröschel	Sara Fletcher
Elmar Mund	Tim Oliver Schultz	Andy Pessoa
Marek	Wotan Wilke Möhring	Derek Phillips
Additional voices
Leonora Pitts; Steven C. Fisher; Hudson West; James Eckhouse; Secunda Wood; Rebecca Davis; Juliana Seda; Bruno Oliver; Brandon Bales
