= Cornelia Gröschel =

German actress (born 1987)

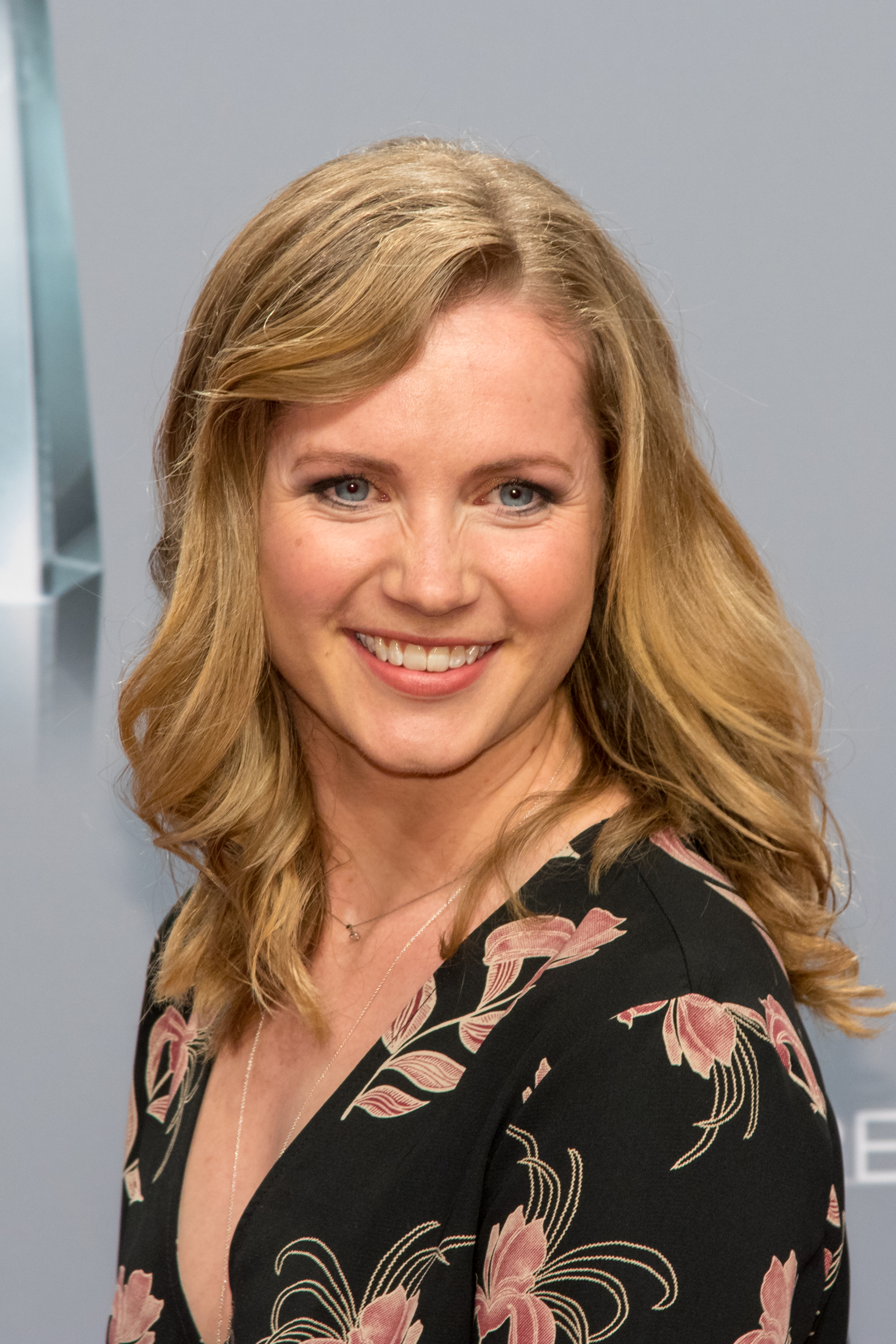
- Born: 1 December 1987 (age 37); Dresden, East Germany
- Occupation: Actress
- Years active: 1992–present
- Agent: Ahoi (agency)
- Website: www.corneliagroeschel.com

Cornelia Gröschel (born 1 December 1987) is a German actress.

== Biography ==
Cornelia Gröschel grew up as one of four children in an artistic family in Dresden. Her father is a singer and a voice teacher, her mother is a ballet répétiteur. As a child Cornelia applied for a role in the television series In aller Freundschaft and from 1998 could be seen playing Franzi Moers in episodes 2 to 16. In 2001, she appeared in the title role in Markus Imboden's film adaptation of Heidi. After a ten-month stay in South Africa and graduation from the St. Benno Gymnasium in Dresden-Johannstadt, from 2007 to 2011 she studied acting at the University of Music and Theatre "Felix Mendelssohn Bartholdy" Leipzig. During her study, she had guest appearances at the Neues Theater Halle. In 2010 she played Juliet in Romeo and Juliet in the Hexenkessel Hoftheater in the Monbijoupark, Berlin. Since September 2011 she is part of the troupe of the Badisches Staatstheater Karlsruhe. In 2012 she was nominated for the Young Actress of the Year Award for the role of Mother in the theater's production of Peter Handke's play Immer noch Sturm (Still Storm).

Cornelia Gröschel's other starring roles on television include a 2006 episode of the crime series Polizeiruf 110 titled Schneewittchen (Snow White), a title role in the 2012 ZDF fairytale Die Schöne und das Biest, and in 2013 the satirical sitcom Lerchenberg, also on ZDF.

== Filmography ==
Year	Title	Type	Episode _{(if applicable)}	Role
1998	Heimatgeschichten	TV series	Ein rettender Engel (1998)	Marie
1999	Schloßhotel Orth	TV series	Spurensuche (1999)	Clara
1999	Das Geheimnis	Short		Janina
2000	Einmal Himmel und retour	TV movie		Kim Jacobsen
2001	Klinik unter Palmen	TV series	Stunden der Entscheidung (2001); Tränen und Tequila (2001); Gebrochene Herzen (2001)	Jasmin Dahl
2001	Heidi	Movie		Heidi Caduff (title role)
2002	Lilly unter den Linden	TV movie		Lilly Engelhardt
2003	Hilfe, ich bin Millionär	TV movie		Sandra Massmann
2003	Für immer verloren	TV movie		Julia Winter
2004	Experiment Bootcamp	TV movie		Lena
2006	F4: Vortex	TV movie		Tine Schütte
2006	Abschnitt 40	TV series	Schutzbehauptung (2006)	Jule Gönnert
2007	Seducing My Husband	TV movie		Jamie Henning
2009	Liebling, weck die Hühner auf	TV movie		Lisa Teuffel
2012	Die Schöne und das Biest	TV movie		Elsa (title role)
2013	Lerchenberg	TV series	All 4 episodes: Das Wunder (2013); Sascha hautnah (2013); Du bist, was du isst (2013); Ein Fall für Zwei (2013)	Judith Kleine
2006–2013	Polizeiruf 110	TV series	Polizeiruf 110: Schneewittchen (2006); Der verlorene Sohn (2013)	Anja Wilke (2006); Lisa (2013)
1998–2013	In aller Freundschaft	TV series	Multiple episodes, 11 in total (1998–1999, 2005, 2013)	Franzi Moers (1998–1999); Sina Bach (2005); Daniela Seibel (2013)
2014		TV series	Licht ins Dunkel (2014)	Hanne Seidel
2014	One Like Her	TV movie		Siggi Thieme
2015	Silvia S.	Movie		Caro Gisecke
2015	Nele in Berlin	TV movie		Nele Schiller (title role)
2015	Dengler - Die letzte Flucht	TV miniseries		Jasmin Berne
2019	Tatort	TV series	Dresden Detectives episodes	Leonie Winkler
2020	Freaks: You're One of Us	Movie		Wendy
2024	Verhängnisvolle Leidenschaft Sylt ("Fatal Passion Sylt")	TV movie ZDF		Nina
