= Sinje Irslinger =

German actress

Sinje Irslinger (born January 30, 1996) is a German actress. Her work has generally been in television. Her credits include Es ist alles in Ordnung, Armans Geheimnis, Der Lehrer (2016–2017), Leipzig Homicide, The Most Beautiful Girl in the World (2018), Die Bergretter and Alle Jahre wieder (2024).
Irslinger is the daughter of a make-up artist and a TV journalist. She was born in Cologne, grew up there and graduated there in 2014. She gained her first acting experience while still at school, completing development, foundation and staging courses at the Comedia Theater de) in Cologne. At the end of the courses, she and twelve other young people wrote the play You may say I'm a dreamer.
During the performance of the play, Irslinger was discovered by a talent agent. Soon after, she appeared in front of the camera for the first time in the short film Guck woanders hin (Look Away).

For her main role in Es ist alles in Ordnung (Everything is Fine), she was awarded the Förderpreis (Advancement Award) at the 2014 German Television Awards (Deutscher Fernsehpreis 2014).
