= Harriet Herbig-Matten =

German actress

- Born: 21 August 2003 (age 23); Munich, Germany
- Occupation: Actress
- Years active: 2015-present

Harriet Herbig-Matten (/ˈhɛr.i.ət ˈhɜːr.bɪg ˈmæt.ən/; born 21 August 2003) is a German actress known for her role as Ruby Bell in the Prime Video series Maxton Hall — The World Between Us. Born in Munich, she started to work professionally in short films in 2015.

== Career ==
In 2017, she appeared in the feature-length film Teenosaurus Rex alongside Jan Josef Liefers as his daughter Carla. Herbig-Matten had a breakout role playing Tina in Bibi & Tina – Die Serie and the spin-off film Bibi & Tina – Einfach anders.

She has also had roles in Nordic Crimes and Ein starkes Team. She appeared in the music video for "The One" by Rea Garvey and VIZE, and in 2021 she played the role of Eleonor in Confessions of Felix Krull. In 2023, she played Paminaa in The Fairy Tale of the Magic Flute.

In 2024, she could be seen in a lead role in the Amazon Prime Video romantic drama Maxton Hall — The World Between Us. She described her character to Who (magazine) as a "real fighter and kind of a nerd" drawn to an unlikely romance with moneyed aristocrat James Beaufort and she said the "special part of this love story is that she is falling in love with his emotional and broken side and not with his narcissistic and arrogant part, and so that's why it's not a toxic relationship". The series topped Prime Video viewing charts in 120 countries and was renewed for a second series in May 2024. She reprised her role as Ruby Bell in the second season which premiered on Prime Video on 7 November 2025. The third and last season with Harriet in the lead role will debut on Prime Video on December 9, 2026.

In 2025, she appeared in on Apple TV+’s first original German-language series Where's Wanda?, which was also renewed for a second season.

== Filmography ==
=== Film ===
Year	Title	Role	Notes	Ref.
2017	Teenosaurus Rex	Carla Wenger		
2021	Confessions of Felix Krull	Eleanor Twentyman		
2022	Bibi & Tina – Einfach Anders	Tina		

=== Television ===
Year	Name	Role	Notes
2017	Dr. Klein	Pauline Holler	1 episode
2020	Bibi & Tina – Die Serie	Tina Martin	10 episodes
2022	Nie zu spät	Tabea Langner	TV film
2022	The Nordic Murders	Paula Ludwig	TV film; episode: "Schneewittchen"
2022	Ein starkes Team	Juna Weinheim	TV film; episode: "Schulzeit"
2023	Sechs auf einen Streich - Das Märchen von der Zauberflöte	Pamina	TV film
2024	Where‘s Wanda?	Lucie Winson	4 episodes
2024-2026	Maxton Hall — The World Between Us	Ruby Bell	12 episodes
2025	Schwarzes Gold	Johanna Lambert	6 episodes

=== Music videos ===
Year	Title	Artist	Notes
2020	"The One"	Rea Garvey featuring VIZE	

== Personal life ==
She speaks German, English, and French.

== Awards and nominations ==
Year	Award	Category	Work	Result	Ref.
2024	Glamour Awards	Rising Actress	Maxton Hall - The World Between us	Won	
2025	Jupiter Award	Best Actress (TV & Streaming) - national	Maxton Hall - The World Between us	Won	
2026	Jupiter Award	Best Actress (TV & Streaming) - national	Maxton Hall - The World Between us	Pending	
