= Gudrun Ritter =

German actress (born 1936)

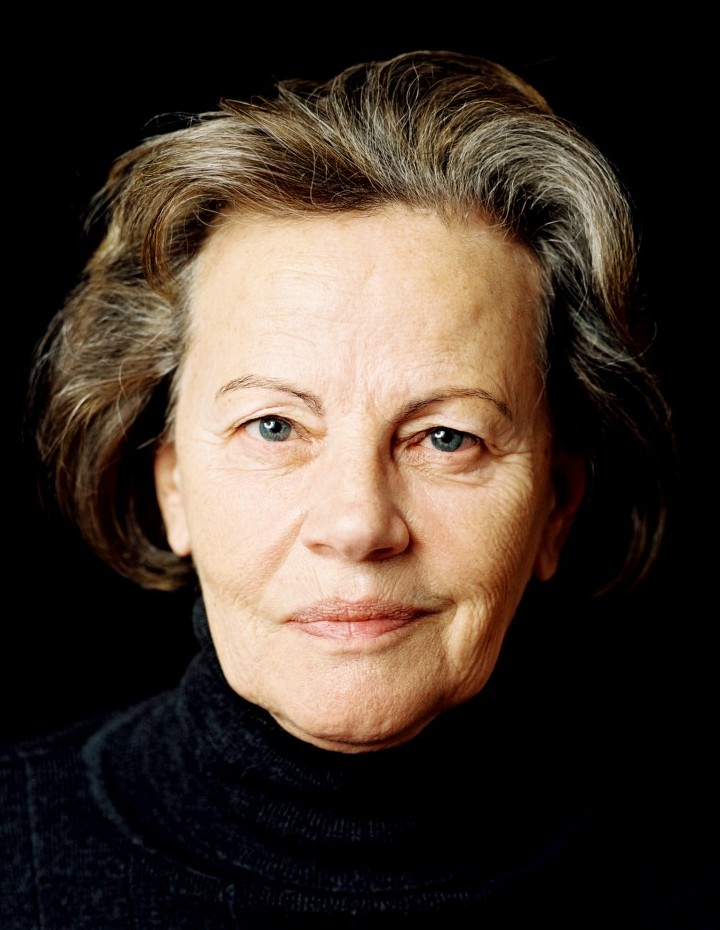
- Ritter in 2000
- Born: 16 November 1936 (age 89); Marienberg, Germany
- Occupation: Actress
- Years active: 1959–present

Gudrun Ritter (born 16 November 1936) is a German actress. She appeared in more than one hundred films since 1959.

== Selected filmography ==
Year	Title	Role	Notes
1975	Between Day and Night		
1980	Jadup and Boel		
1982	Romance with Amelie		
1989	Coming Out		
2005	Antibodies		
2007	Vacation		
2009	Haus und Kind		TV film
2010	The Poll Diaries		
2010	Boxhagener Platz		
2015	Look Who's Back	Grandma Krömeier	
2020	The Last Word		
2020	Deutschland 89		
