= Hello Again: A Wedding a Day =

- Theatrical release poster
- Directed by: Maggie Peren
- Written by: Maggie Peren
- Produced by: Jochen Laube; Fabian Maubach
- Starring: Emilia Schüle; Tim Oliver Schultz; Alicia von Rittberg; Edin Hasanović
- Cinematography: Marc Achenbach
- Edited by: Robert Hauser
- Music by: Superstrings
- Production companies: Sommerhaus Filmproduktion; Warner Bros. Film Productions Germany
- Distributed by: Warner Bros. Pictures
- Release date: 17 September 2020
- Running time: 92 minutes
- Country: Germany
- Language: German

Hello Again: A Wedding a Day (German: Hello Again - Ein Tag für immer) is a 2020 German romantic comedy film directed by Maggie Peren.

== Cast ==
- Edin Hasanović as Anton
- Samuel Schneider as Patrick
- Tim Oliver Schultz as Philipp
- Emilia Schüle as Franziska
- Maximilian Gehrlinger as Felix Neumann
- Amelie Plaas-Link as Leonie
- Alicia von Rittberg as Zazie
