= The Most Beautiful Girl in the World (2018 film) =

2018 German film

- Film poster
- German: Das schönste Mädchen der Welt
- Directed by: Aron Lehmann
- Written by: Lars Kraume; Aron Lehmann; Judy Horney
- Starring: Aaron Hilmer; Damian Hardung
- Release date: 29 June 2018 (MIFF)
- Running time: 102 minutes
- Country: Germany
- Language: German

The Most Beautiful Girl in the World (German: Das schönste Mädchen der Welt) is a 2018 German comedy/romance film directed by Aron Lehmann. It takes the play Cyrano de Bergerac into the 21st century.

== Synopsis ==
The story is about a girl, Roxy, who moves to a new school. Here she makes friends with Cyril who is an outcast throughout school, he starts to fall in love with her but is too afraid to mention it so he expresses his feelings through Rick.

== Music ==
Cyril writes music to Roxy throughout the movie and some of these have gained popularity, such as the song 'Immer wenn wir uns sehn' meaning 'Whenever we see each other' which was written with song artist Lea. The song managed to make it into the German single charts.

== Cast ==
- Aaron Hilmer as Cyril
- Damian Hardung as Rick
- Luna Wedler as Roxy
- Jonas Ems as Benno
- Heike Makatsch as Miss Reimann
- Anke Engelke as Cyril's mother
- Golo Euler as Marc
- Sinje Irslinger as Lissi
- Julia Beautx as Titti
