= Tim Oliver Schultz =

German actor

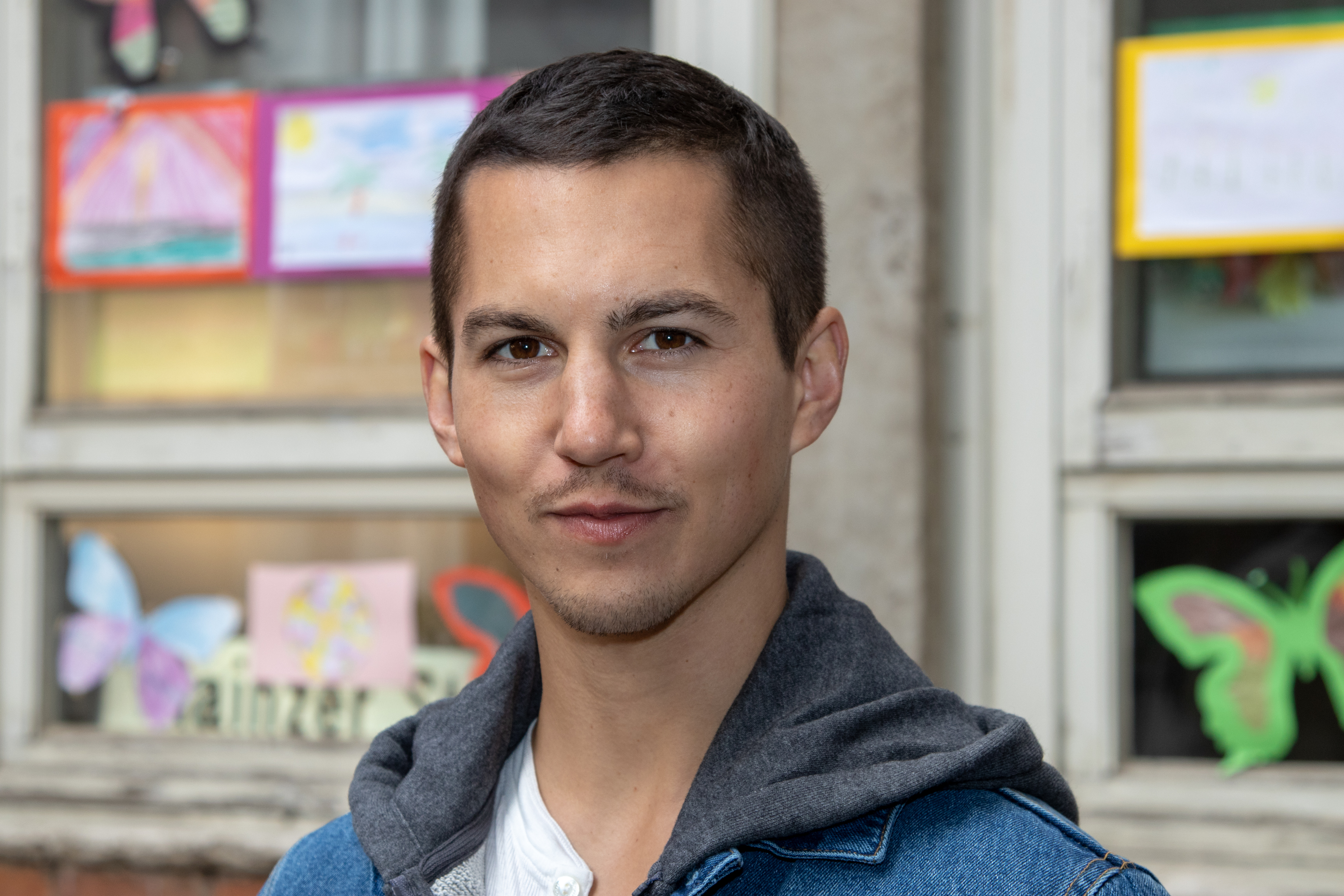
Tim Oliver Schultz (2018)

Tim Oliver Schultz (born 22 July 1988 in West Berlin) is a German actor.

== Early life ==
Schultz grew up in Berlin-Wannsee with three siblings. His parents divorced when he was twelve years old.

== Career ==
He had his first TV appearance in the German comedy series Beim nächsten Coup wird alles anders (2000). He went on to appear in German shows like Ein starkes Team (2001) and Schloss Einstein (2005–2006). Schultz also appeared in numerous films, most notably The Wave (2008), When Inge Is Dancing (2013) and Freaks: You're One of Us (2020). He won the Grimme Award in 2016 for his performance in the lead role of Leo Roland in the television series Club der roten Bänder.

== Personal life ==
Since 2011, Schultz has been studying filmmaking at Deutsche Film- und Fernsehakademie Berlin and has one child.

== Filmography ==
Year	Film	Role	Other notes
2003	Sternzeichen	Jonas Becker	
2007	The Other Boy	Paul Wagner	
2008	The Wave	Jens	
2011	Ameisen gehen andere Wege	Richard	
2013	When Inge Is Dancing	Max	
2014	Vampire Sisters 2: Bats in the Belly	Murdo	
2016	Vampire Sisters 3: Journey to Transylvania	Murdo	
2018	Haunted Hospital: Heilstätten	Theo	
2019	Club der roten Bänder – Wie alles begann	Leo Roland	
2019	Song für Mia	Sebastian	
2019	Benjamin Blümchen	Karl	
2020	Enkel für Anfänger	Tobias	
2020	Freaks: You're One of Us	Anton	
2020	Hello Again: A Wedding a Day	Philipp	
2021	The Four of Us	Anton	
2023	Manta, Manta: Legacy	Daniel	
Year	Television series	Role	Other notes
2001	Ein starkes Team	Mirko	(TV movie) 1 episode
2001	Inspektor Rolle	Tim	TV series, 1 episode; uncredited
2005	Glück auf halber Treppe	Tim Berger	(TV movie)
2005	KRIMI.DE	Lukas	TV series, 2 episodes
2005-2006	Schloss Einstein	Joe	TV series, 13 episodes
2007	Another Word and I'll Marry You!	Lukas Brand	(TV movie)
2008	Hallo Robbie!	Felix	TV series, 4 episodes
2009	Volcano	Maggi	(TV movie)
2009	Heute keine Entlassung	Jens Franzen	(TV movie)
2009-2011	Leipzig Homicide	Marko Kollwitz	TV series, 2 episodes
2010	Siebenstein	Indianer Schlauer Rabe	TV series, 1 episode
2010	Zurück zum Glück	young Falko Wegner	(TV movie)
2010	Polizeiruf 110	Daniel Reimers	TV series, 1 episode
2010	Vater aus heiterem Himmel	Daniel Neumann	(TV movie)
2011	SOKO Stuttgart	Dominik Gscheid	TV series, 1 episode
2011	SOKO Wismar	Erik Binz	TV series, 1 episode
2012-2015	Alarm for Cobra 11 – The Highway Police	Max Berger (2012)/Mehmet Özman (2015)	TV series, 2 episodes
2014	SOKO Köln	David Fitz	TV series, 1 episode
2014	The Story of the Youth Who Went Forth to Learn What Fear Was	Michel	(TV movie)
2014	Kripo Holstein – Mord und Meer	Ole Rotkirch	TV series, 1 episode
2015	The White Snake	Endres	(TV movie)
2015-2017	Club der roten Bänder	Leo Roland	TV series, 30 episodes
2017	Einstein	Lutz Heineking	TV series, 1 episode
2021	Goldjungs	Mick Sommer	(TV movie)
2022	Damaged Goods	Mads	TV series, 8 episodes
