= Lea (musician) =

German musician (born 1992)

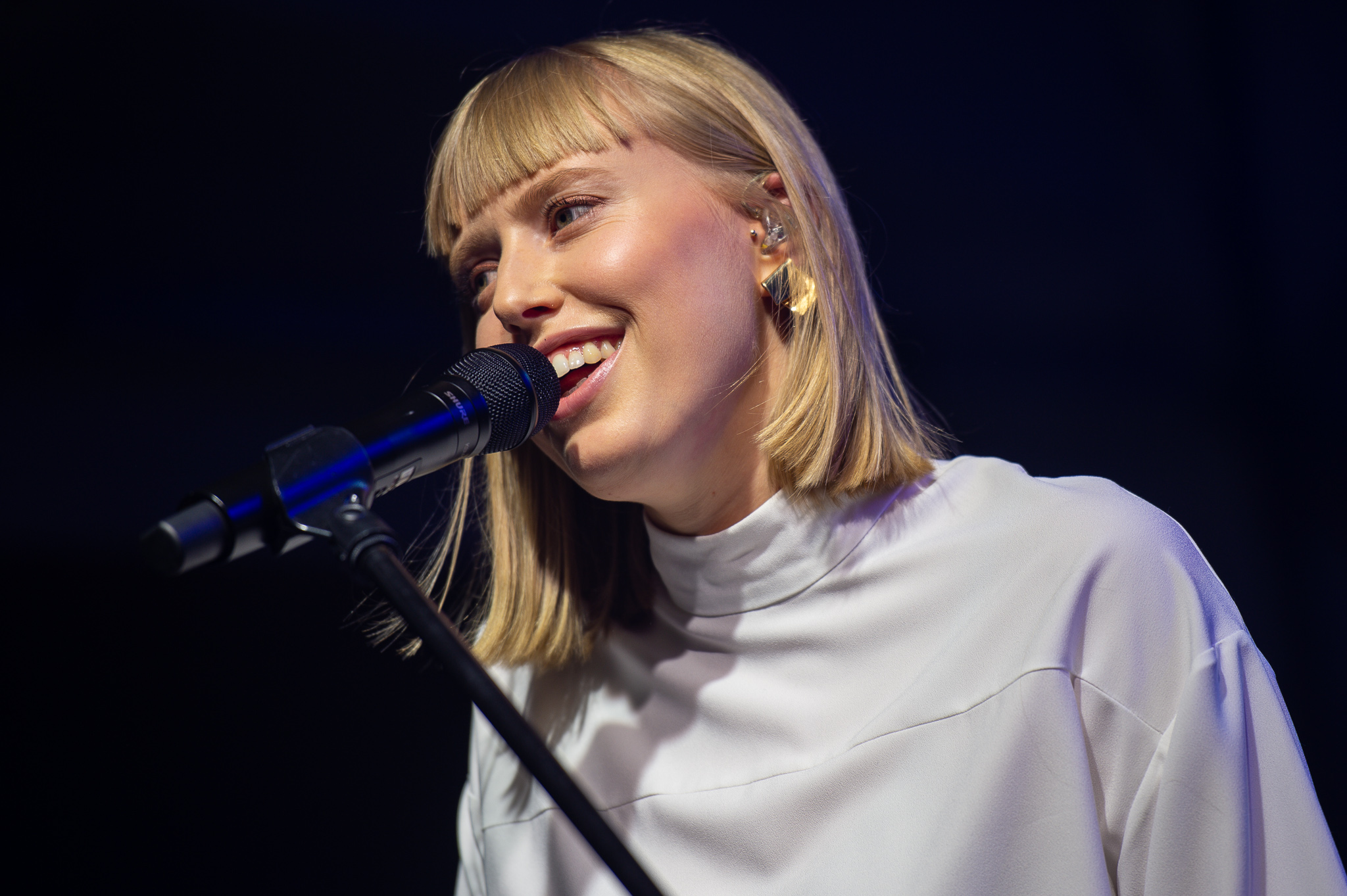
- Lea at concert 2019

Background information
- Born: Lea-Marie Becker; 9 July 1992 (age 34); Kassel, Germany
- Occupation: Singer-songwriter
- Years active: 2007–present
- Label: Four Music
- Website: thisislealea.de

Lea-Marie Becker (born 9 July 1992), known professionally as Lea (stylized as LEA), is a German singer-songwriter and keyboardist.

== Life and career ==
Lea is the daughter of a music therapist. When she was 15, she began releasing videos on YouTube, under her first name Lea-Marie. Her song Wo ist die Liebe hin was viewed more than 2.7 million times. She studied music and special education in Hannover.

Her version of Hildegard Knef's So hat alles seinen Sinn was included in the compilation album Für Hilde in 2015, leading to the record label Four Music publishing her debut album Vakuum in 2016. In it she handled her first relationship and the feeling of not knowing where home is.

Her songs describe themes of love, friendship, and loneliness. Many of her songs are internal monologues, in which she asks herself questions that often remain unanswered.

In 2017, she went on her first tour, along with Frederic Michel (percussion) and Hannes Porombka (guitar and synthesizer). She also performed at the Early Spring Singer Songwriter Festival in Saalfelden.

Also in 2017, a remix of Wohin willst du?, in collaboration with Gestört aber GeiL, reached 11th place in the German single charts, along with 43rd place in the Austrian charts. She also wrote Be My Now with Gestört aber GeiL, which was used as the title song of the eighth season of the German version of The Bachelor. It is in English while all of her other songs are written in German.

In August 2018, she released the song Immer wenn wir uns sehn, written in collaboration with actor Aaron Hilmer for the film Das schönste Mädchen der Welt. In September 2019, she released 110, a collaboration with Capital Bra and Samra, which reached the top place in the German charts.

Lea was a participant in the 7th season of Sing meinen Song – Das Tauschkonzert.

She lived in Hannover until 2018. Since 2018, she has lived in Berlin.

== Discography ==
=== Albums ===
List of albums, with selected chart positions
Title	Release date	Peak chart positions			Certifications
Title	Release date	GER	AUT	SWI	Certifications
Vakuum	Released: 22 April 2016; Label: Four Music; Format: CD, digital download	—	—	—	
Zwischen meinen Zeilen	Released: 14 September 2018; Label: Four Music; Format: CD, LP, digital download	6	53	35	BVMI: Gold
Treppenhaus	Released: 29 May 2020; Label: Four Music; Format: CD, LP, digital download	5	7	6	BVMI: Gold
Fluss	Released: 5 November 2021; Label: Four Music; Format: CD, LP, digital download	6	6	7	
Bülowstraße	Released: 4 May 2023; Label: Treppenhaus Records; Format: CD, LP, digital download	5	19	13	
Von der Schönheit und Zerbrechlichkeit der Dinge	Released: 4 October 2024; Label: Treppenhaus Records; Format: CD, LP, digital download	5	18	17	
"—" denotes a recording that did not chart or was not released in that territory.

=== Singles ===
As lead artist

List of singles, with selected chart positions
Title	Year	Peak chart positions			Certifications	Album
Title	Year	GER	AUT	SWI	Certifications	Album
"Wunderkerzenmenschen"	2017	—	—	—		Zwischen meinen Zeilen
"Leiser"	2017	13	41	36	BVMI: Platinum	Zwischen meinen Zeilen
"Zu Dir"	2018	54	—	—	BVMI: Gold	Zwischen meinen Zeilen
"Immer wenn wir uns sehn" (with Cyril)	2018	16	59	—	BVMI: Platinum	Zwischen meinen Zeilen
"Halb so viel"	2019	—	—	—		Zwischen meinen Zeilen
"110 (Prolog)"	2019	43	—	80	BVMI: Gold	Treppenhaus
"Treppenhaus"	2020	18	48	96	BVMI: Platinum	Treppenhaus
"Okay"	2020	85	—	—		Treppenhaus
"7 Stunden" (with Capital Bra)	2020	10	14	27	BVMI: Platinum; IFPI SWI: Gold	Treppenhaus
"Beifahrersitz" (with Majan)	2020	48	—	—		Treppenhaus
"Das Leben (du warst schon immer so)"	2020	88	—	—		Treppenhaus
"Du tust es immer wieder"	2020	79	—	—		Treppenhaus
"Schwarz" (with Casper)	2021	7	41	70	BVMI: Gold; IFPI AUT: Gold	Fluss
"Wenn du mich lässt"	2021	22	52	87	BVMI: Gold; IFPI AUT: Gold	Fluss
"Parfum"	2021	43	—	—		Fluss
"Küsse wie Gift" (with Luna)	2021	19	50	70		Fluss
"Eigentlich" (with 01099)	2022	19	48	64		Non-album single
"In Flammen"	2022	—	—	—		Non-album single
"—" denotes a recording that did not chart or was not released in that territory.

As featured artist

List of singles as featured artist, with selected chart positions
Title	Year	Peak chart positions			Certifications	Album
Title	Year	GER	AUT	SWI	Certifications	Album
"Wohin willst du" (Gestört aber GeiL featuring Lea)	2017	11	43	—	BVMI: 3× Gold	#ZWEI
"110" (Capital Bra and Samra featuring Lea)	2019	1	2	2	BVMI: 2× Platinum; IFPI AUT: Gold	Berlin lebt 2
"Bis zum Mond" (Dikka featuring Lea)	2020	—	—	—		Oh Yeah!
"Drei Uhr nachts" (Mark Forster featuring Lea)	2021	15	32	68	BVMI: Platinum; IFPI AUT: Platinum	Musketiere
"Sommer" (Beatzarre and Djorkaeff featuring Lea and Capital Bra)	2021	3	13	20		Non-album single
"Dass du mich liebst" (Klan featuring Lea)	2022	93	—	—		Jaaaaaaaaaaaaaaaa!
"Nur noch ein Lied" (Bosse featuring Lea)	2023	—	—	—		Übers Träumen
"1000 Mal" (Bausa featuring Lea)	2023	26	—	—		Der Letzte macht das Licht aus
"—" denotes a recording that did not chart or was not released in that territory.

=== Other charted songs ===
List of other charted songs, with selected chart positions
Title	Year	Peak chart positions	Album
Title	Year	GER	Album
"Aperol im Glas" (with 01099)	2023	45	Bülowstraße

== Awards and nominations ==
=== Results ===
Year	Award	Nomination	Work	Result	Ref.
2018	New Music Awards	Newcomer of the Year	Herself	Won	
2018	Bambi	Audience-Bambi (New German Music Stars)	Herself	Nominated	
2019	Bravo Otto Awards	Musician national	Herself	Bronze	
2019	Audi Generation Awards	Music national	Herself	Won	
2019	1LIVE Krone Awards	Best Female Artist	Herself	Nominated	
2019	1LIVE Krone Awards	Best Single	110 (with Capital Bra, Samra)	Nominated	
2020	Nickelodeon Kids Choice Awards	Favourite Musician (Germany, Austria, Switzerland)	Herself	Nominated	
2020	MTV Europe Music Awards	Best German Act	Herself	Nominated	
2020	1LIVE Krone Awards	Best Female Artist	Herself	Won	
2020	Bravo Otto Awards	Musician national	Herself	Nominated	
2021	Bravo Otto Awards	Musician national	Herself	Nominated	
2021	1LIVE Krone Awards	Best Female Artist	Herself	Won	
2022	1LIVE Krone Awards	Best Female Artist	Herself	Won	
