= The Last Word (2020 TV series) =

- Release poster
- Genre: Comedy drama
- Written by: Carlos V. Irmscher; Aron Lehmann; Carolina Zimmerman; Burkhardt Wunderlich
- Directed by: Aron Lehmann; Pola Beck
- Starring: Anke Engelke; Thorsten Merten; Johannes Zeiler; Nina Gummich; Juri Winkler; Gudrun Ritter; Claudia Geisler-Bading; Aaron Hilmer
- Music by: Boris Bojadzhiev
- Country of origin: Germany
- Original language: German
- No. of seasons: 1
- No. of episodes: 6

Production
- Executive producers: Daniel Sonnabend; Dan Maag; Stephanie Schettler-Köhler; Patrick Zorer; Nicolas Paalzow
- Cinematography: Andreas Berger
- Editors: Ana de Mier y Ortuño; Simon Blasi; Laura Heine
- Running time: 30–49 minutes
- Production company: Pantaleon Films

Original release
- Network: Netflix
- Release: 17 September 2020

The Last Word (German: Das letzte Wort) is a 2020 German television series starring Anke Engelke.

== Cast ==
- Anke Engelke as Karla Fazius
- Thorsten Merten as Andreas Borowski
- Johannes Zeiler as Stefan Fazius
- Nina Gummich as Judith Fazius
- Juri Winkler as Tonio Fazius
- Gudrun Ritter as Mina Dahlbeck
- Claudia Geisler-Bading as Frauke Borowski
- Aaron Hilmer as Ronnie Borowski
- Dela Dabulamanzi as Dr. Owusu

== Episodes ==
No.	Title	Directed by	Written by	Original release date
1	"Episode 1"	Aron Lehmann	Carlos V. Irmscher & Aron Lehmann	17 September 2020
2	"Episode 2"	Aron Lehmann	Carlos V. Irmscher & Aron Lehmann	17 September 2020
3	"Episode 3"	Aron Lehmann	Carolina Zimmerman	17 September 2020
4	"Episode 4"	Pola Beck	Burkhardt Wunderlich	17 September 2020
5	"Episode 5"	Pola Beck	Burkhardt Wunderlich	17 September 2020
6	"Episode 6"	Pola Beck	Carlos V. Irmscher	17 September 2020

== Release ==
The Last Word was released on 17 September 2020 on Netflix.

== Awards and nominations ==
The Last Word won the German Television Award for Best Comedy Series in 2021 and received a nomination for a Grimme Award in the same year.
