= Our Kind of Traitor (film) =

- Theatrical release poster
- Directed by: Susanna White
- Screenplay by: Hossein Amini
- Based on: Our Kind of Traitor by John le Carré
- Produced by: Simon Cornwell; Stephen Cornwell; Gail Egan
- Starring: Ewan McGregor; Naomie Harris; Stellan Skarsgård; Damian Lewis; Alicia von Rittberg; Velibor Topić
- Cinematography: Anthony Dod Mantle
- Edited by: Tariq Anwar; Lucia Zucchetti
- Music by: Marcelo Zarvos
- Production companies: Film4; The Ink Factory; Potboiler Productions; StudioCanal
- Distributed by: StudioCanal
- Release dates: 1 May 2016 (SFIFF); 13 May 2016 (United Kingdom)
- Running time: 107 minutes
- Country: United Kingdom
- Language: English
- Box office: $9.7 million

Our Kind of Traitor is a 2016 British spy thriller film directed by Susanna White and written by Hossein Amini, based on John le Carré's 2010 novel of the same name. Starring Ewan McGregor, Naomie Harris, Stellan Skarsgård, Damian Lewis and Alicia von Rittberg, the film was released in the United Kingdom on 13 May 2016 by StudioCanal.

== Plot ==
In a money laundering scheme, "The Prince" – leader of the Russian Mafia – creates a new bank in London and has its financial oligarchs sign over their accounts to him. The first oligarch and his family are murdered by a blue-eyed assassin.

While on vacation in Morocco with his wife Gail, Perry MacKendrick strikes up a friendship with Dima, a boisterous Russian with an eidetic memory. They bond over drinks and tennis before Dima invites the MacKendricks to his daughter's birthday, where Dima gives Perry a USB drive linking corrupt British politicians and businessmen to the Russian mafia. Fearing for his and his family's life, he pleads with Perry to turn the drive over to MI6 when he returns to London.

Perry gives the drive to MI6 agent Hector, the investigator in charge. Dima’s information enables Hector and his supervisor Billy to witness a meeting between the Prince and corrupt politician Aubrey Longrigg. Because Hector holds a grudge against Longrigg (believing that Longrigg tipped off the police to his son's drug-dealing), Billy refuses to sanction an investigation. Despite this, Hector recruits the MacKendricks to stage a chance encounter with Dima in France. There, Dima provides the names of his clients and confirms each has received £5 million for their endorsement of the new bank, with Longrigg receiving £20 million. Dima refuses to provide the bank account numbers until he and his family have been granted asylum in London.

Emilio, the Prince's consigliere, suspects the MacKendricks and has henchman Niki intimidate them in his rough neighborhood, where Perry intervenes when the blue-eyed assassin beats a woman. Gail is touched by her husband's protectiveness, and their relationship, fraught after Perry's affair with a student, begins to heal. Hector reveals to the MacKendricks that he only has two men and has been funding the operation himself. They plan to seize Dima and his family after he signs the accounts over to the bank. Gail successfully retrieves Dima's wife and children, and Perry brings Dima himself to safety.

As the family are about to board a charter plane back to London, Billy calls Hector with the news that Longrigg has convinced the Home Office to deny the family asylum. Thwarted, Hector returns to London alone, but the MacKendricks refuse to leave Dima and his family.

Hector sends everyone to a safehouse in the French Alps, from where Dima's daughter calls one of the bodyguards, Andrei, by whom she is pregnant. Andrei traces the call and the blue-eyed assassin leads an attack on the safehouse, fended off by Dima and the agents. Dima chases the assassin into the woods, but is almost beaten to death before Perry intervenes, injuring the assassin by shooting him and allowing Dima to kill him with a rock.

In London, Hector convinces the UK Treasury Office that the Prince's bank is a cover to launder the Russian mafia’s money in London. For Dima and his family to receive asylum, Hector must provide the account numbers and names of the corrupt UK politicians and bankers involved, kept only in Dima’s memory.

A deal is made to send Dima to London by helicopter, followed by his family once his memorised information has been verified. The attack at the safe house and his wife's insistence convinces Dima to go, and Perry volunteers to accompany him.

The family and Gail are driven to another safe house while Dima, Perry, and Hector's agent head to the helicopter rendezvous. Sensing danger, Dima insists Perry not come with him. The helicopter explodes over the Alps, killing Dima and Hector's agent, and the mafia bank opens in London and begins trading at massive profit; Longrigg is announced as the new Minister for Trade and Industry.

Dima's family receives asylum, arranged by Hector as compensation for Dima's murder. Perry gives Hector a gift from Dima, an ornate pistol the Prince had given Dima upon the signing of the accounts. After Perry leaves, Hector finds a tiny roll of paper addressed to him from Dima, hidden in the pistol's chamber, listing all the corrupt Britons' names and account numbers.

== Cast ==
- Ewan McGregor as Perry MacKendrick
- Stellan Skarsgård as Dima
- Naomie Harris as Gail MacKendrick
- Damian Lewis as Hector
- Saskia Reeves as Tamara
- Khalid Abdalla as Luke
- Velibor Topić as Emilio Del Oro
- Alicia von Rittberg as Natasha
- Mark Gatiss as Billy Matlock
- Mark Stanley as Ollie
- Jeremy Northam as Aubrey Longrigg
- Grigoriy Dobrygin as The Prince
- Marek Oravec as Andrei
- Pawel Szajda as the Blue-Eyed Killer
- Alec Utgoff as Niki
- John le Carré as ticket collector at Einstein Museum (uncredited)

== Production ==
Principal photography began on 26 March 2014 and continued for ten weeks. Locations included London and its suburbs, Finland, Bern, Paris, the French Alps and Marrakech. Le Carré was executive producer and also makes a cameo appearance in the film as an usher at Einstein Museum.

== Filming location ==
The vacationing location was changed from Antigua in the book to Morocco in the adaptation. Filming locations included Marrakesh, Morocco; Bern, Switzerland; Moscow, Russia; Paris, France; Rukatunturi, Finland; the Bolshoi Ballet; and London, England.

== Music ==
Our Kind of Traitor (Original Motion Picture Soundtrack)

Soundtrack album by Marcelo Zarvos
- Released: May 13, 2016
- Recorded: 2016
- Genre: Soundtrack
- Length: 62:11
- Label: Quartet Records

=== Soundtrack ===
Our Kind of Traitor (Original Motion Picture Soundtrack) is the soundtrack album for Our Kind of Traitor. The soundtrack album was released on 13 May 2016, by Quartet Records.

Track listing

All tracks were composed by Marcelo Zarvos, and performed by the London Metropolitan Orchestra conducted by Andrew Brown.

No.	Title	Length
1.	"The Ballet"	6:31
2.	"Journey to Bern"	1:23
3.	"First Tennis Match"	3:10
4.	"Chalet Attack"	5:18
5.	"Dima's Children"	1:17
6.	"Family Escape, Pt. 1"	2:45
7.	"The List"	2:39
8.	"Meeting at Club des rois"	3:53
9.	"Family Escape, Pt. 2"	4:33
10.	"Gail's Theme"	1:07
11.	"Second Tennis Match"	2:35
12.	"Perry's Rescue"	1:41
13.	"Dima's Proposal"	3:16
14.	"The Vory"	3:23
15.	"Paris Detour"	2:02
16.	"Farewell"	2:47
17.	"The Prince"	5:50
18.	"You're a Good Man, Professor"	1:39
19.	"Under Scrutiny"	3:10
20.	"Our Kind of Traitor"	3:27
Total length:		62:26

== Release ==
In November 2015, Lionsgate acquired the US distribution rights to the film.

== Reception ==
=== Box office ===
Our Kind of Traitor opened on 13 May 2016. As of 1 September 2016, it has grossed $9,419,763 worldwide.

=== Critical response ===
On the review aggregator Rotten Tomatoes, Our Kind of Traitor has an approval rating of 72%, based on 142 reviews, with an average rating of 6.0/10. The site's critical consensus reads, "Our Kind of Traitor relies on solid writing and acting rather than action to deliver its spy-movie thrills — and thankfully has the pedigree to pull it off on both fronts." On Metacritic, the film has a score of 57 out of 100, based on reviews from 30 critics, indicating "mixed or average reviews".
