= Aaron Hilmer =

German actor (born 1999)

- Born: May 11, 1999 (age 27); Freiburg im Breisgau, Germany
- Occupation: Actor
- Years active: 2011–present

Aaron Hilmer (born May 11, 1999) is a German-Australian actor. He is best known for co-starring as Albert Kropp in the four-time Academy Award-winning anti-war drama All Quiet on the Western Front (2022). He played the lead role of Cyril in the Cyrano de Bergerac based teen comedy The Most Beautiful Girl in the World (2018) and starred in the ZDFneo series Sløborn (2020–2024). Hilmer began acting as a child and had recurring and guest roles in TV series including Die Pfefferkörner (2013–2014) and Tatort (2017, 2021). He also appeared in TV films such as Wer ohne Schuld ist (2024).

== Early life ==
Hilmer was born on May 11, 1999, in Freiburg and grew up in Hamburg with his mother and older brother. His father, Paul Pollock, was an Australian painter and artist who lived and worked in Freiburg; Hilmer frequently traveled there during school holidays. He has four siblings, who live around the globe, including Australia.

As a child, Hilmer enjoyed climbing trees, encouraged by his older brother and a neighbor who worked as an industrial climber. The neighbor, who was working at the Neue Flora theatre at the time, suggested he try out for the role of young Tarzan. Around age eleven, Hilmer auditioned for the musical Tarzan, marking the beginning of his acting career.

Hilmer appeared in his first television roles while still attending school, including the children’s series Die Pfefferkörner. In 2015, alongside his regular schooling, he took six months of additional acting, singing, and dance classes at the New Talent Agentur and Schauspielschule in Hamburg.

== Career ==
Hilmer’s early television appearances included Die Kanzlei and Tatort. He also appeared in short films, Cowboy und Indianer (2011) and Ich bleibe (2018) produced by the Hamburg Media School.

From 2017, Hilmer began performing in feature films, including Einsamkeit und Sex und Mitleid (2017) and the teen comedy The Most Beautiful Girl in the World (2018). For The Most Beautiful Girl in the World (2018), Hilmer recorded songs for the film’s soundtrack. One of these, “Immer wenn wir uns sehn”, was released as a duet with German singer Lea and reached the German singles charts. In 2019, he appeared in the ZDF miniseries Preis der Freiheit, a historical drama set during the final years of East‑West German division. He has also appeared in two episodes of Tatort – Amour Fou (2017) and Tatort – Der Herr des Waldes (2021). In 2021, Hilmer starred as Ray in the award-winning experimental film First Time [The Time for All but Sunset – Violet], which serves as a prequel to the 2017 film Final Stage [The Time for All but Sunset – BGYOR]. The performance was noted for its "nuanced" and virtually wordless quality, with FilmInk describing Hilmer's portrayal as "subtle". The film received a Special Mention at the 74th Locarno Film Festival.

Hilmer played student leader Rudi Dutschke in the 2020 docudrama Dutschke – Schüsse von Rechts. In 2020, he appeared as a mortician in the Netflix series The Last Word alongside Anke Engelke. This was followed by a prominent role as Albert Kropp in the Oscar-winning anti-war drama All Quiet on the Western Front (2022). He also starred in the Amazon Prime Video series Luden (2023), playing a character based on Klaus Barkowsky in a performance noted by critics for captivating the audience. In 2025, he starred in the leading role of Richard Pape in the ARD historic Western drama series Schwarzes Gold (Black Gold). In 2026, Hilmer won the prestigious Grimme-Preis for Fiction as part of the ensemble cast for his performance in Die Nichte des Polizisten.

== Personal life ==
Hilmer lives in the Altona borough of Hamburg, Germany. He enjoys DIY projects and working on motorcycles. His brother runs a restaurant in Hamburg called Klappe, where Hilmer occasionally helps in the kitchen.

Inspired by his father, who grew up in Australia, Hilmer developed an early interest in Western stories. He expressed a desire to work with horses and, for Schwarzes Gold, undertook riding lessons, stunt training, and team-building exercises on set.

He is the godfather of a fellow actor’s child, based in Portugal. He engages in travel and adventure, including trips to South America (Bolivia and Peru) and North America (Mexico), and has considered relocating to Portugal.

== Filmography ==
=== Film ===
| Year | Title | Role | Notes | Ref. |
|---|---|---|---|---|
| 2016 | Schrotten! (English: Scrappin') | Kamelle | Feature film | |
| 2017 | Einsamkeit und Sex und Mitleid | Johnny | Feature film | |
| 2018 | The Most Beautiful Girl in the World (German: Das Schönste Mädchen der Welt) | Cyril | Feature film, credited for song performances, including charting single "Immer wenn wir uns sehn" | |
| 2021 | First Time [The Time for All but Sunset – Violet] | Ray | Medium-length Film, Special Mention at the 74th Locarno Film Festival | |
| 2022 | All Quiet on the Western Front (German: Im Westen nichts Neues) | Albert Kropp | Feature film | |
| 2026 | Trial of Hein | Volker | Feature Film | |
| 2026 | Sommer auf Asphalt | Tyler | Feature Film | |

=== Television ===
| Year | Title | Role | Notes | Ref. |
|---|---|---|---|---|
| 2013–2014 | Die Pfefferkörner (English: The Peppercorns) | Diego | Series Role | |
| 2015 | Die Kanzlei | Guest role | Stolz und Vorurteil (episode) | |
| 2016 | Apropos Glück | Jannick | TV Film | |
| 2017 | Notruf Hafenkante | Hendrik | Episode: "Sprache der Stärke", Guest role | |
| 2017 | Tatort (English: Crime Scene) | Stipe Rajic | Episode: "Amour Fou", Series Guest Role | |
| 2018 | Der Auftrag | Miki Witt | TV Film | |
| 2018 | In aller Freundschaft – Die jungen Ärzte | Simon Funke | Season 4 Episode 20 "Alte Wunden" | |
| 2018 | SOKO Leipzig | Sammy | Episode "Gefährliches Vorbild (English: A Dangerous Role Model)" | |
| 2019 | Preis der Freiheit | Roland Bohla | TV Film | |
| 2019 | Der Kommissar und die Wut | Tim Jatzkowski | TV Film | |
| 2020-2024 | Sløborn (English: The Island) | Devid | Series Role, Seasons I-III | |
| 2020 | Dutschke – Schüsse von Rechts | Rudi Dutschke | TV Film / Docudrama | |
| 2020 | The Last Word | Ronnie Borowski | VOD Series | |
| 2020 | Aus dem Tagebuch eines Uber‑Fahrers | Elias | VOD Series/ Dramedy | |
| 2021 | Tatort – Der Herr des Waldes | Manuel Siebert | Episode: "Der Herr des Waldes", Series Guest Role | |
| 2023 | Luden (English: The Pimp: No F***Ing Fairytale) | Klaus Barkowsky | Amazon Series | |
| 2024 | Wer ohne Schuld ist (English: Who is Without Fault) | Paul Stiller | TV Film | |
| 2025 | Die Nichte des Polizisten | Pedro Sanchez | TV Film | |
| 2025 | Schwarzes Gold (English: Black Gold) | Richard Pape | Series | |

=== Short films ===
| Year | Title | Role | Notes | Ref. |
|---|---|---|---|---|
| 2011 | Cowboy und Indianer | Philip as Kid | Hamburg Media School | |
| 2017 | Final Stage [The Time for All but Sunset – BGYOR] | Ray | Premiered at the 67th Berlin International Film Festival | |
| 2018 | Ich Bleibe | Lukas | Hamburg Media School | |
| 2023 | Schiele – Eine persönliche Begegnung | Merkel | VR Short Film/ Art | |
| 2024 | Stuck in Pause | | Short Film | |

== Awards and nominations ==
| Year | Association | Category | Work | Result | Ref. |
|---|---|---|---|---|---|
| 2018 | Günter‑Rohrbach‑Filmpreis – Preis des Saarländischen Rundfunks | Besondere Leistung als Jungdarsteller (Outstanding performance as a young actor) | The Most Beautiful Girl in the World | Won | |
| 2019 | Bunte New Faces Award | Bester Nachwuchsdarsteller (Best Young Actor) | The Most Beautiful Girl in the World | Won | |
| 2020 | Deutscher Filmball | Bester Nachwuchsdarsteller (Best Young Actor) | The Most Beautiful Girl in the World | Won | |
| 2020 | Tallinn Black Nights Film Festival | Black Nights Star | The Most Beautiful Girl in the World | Won | |
| 2023 | Deutsche Akademie für Fernsehen (German Academy for Television) | Bester Hauptdarsteller (Best Actor in Leading Role) | Luden | Nominated | |
| 2023 | Jupiter Awards | Bester Darsteller (TV & Streaming) national (Best Actor) | Luden | Nominated | |
| 2025 | Deutscher Fernsehpreis (German TV Awards) | Bester Schauspieler (Best Actor) | Wer ohne Schuld ist | Nominated | |
| 2026 | Grimme-Preis | Fiction (Representing the Ensemble) | Die Nichte des Polizisten | Won | |
