= Club der roten Bänder =

German television series

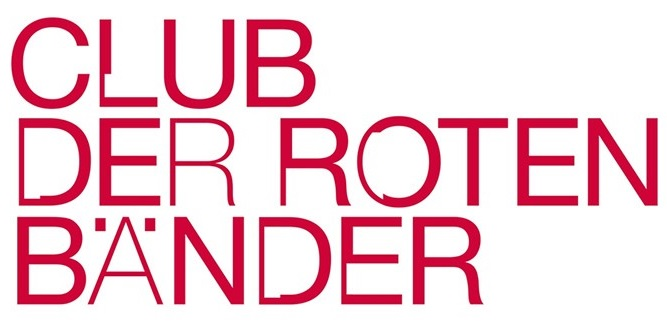
- Genre: Comedy drama; Medical drama
- Based on: Polseres vermelles by Albert Espinosa
- Starring: Tim Oliver Schultz; Damian Hardung; Luise Befort; Timur Bartels; Ivo Kortlang; Nick Julius Schuck
- Country of origin: Germany
- Original language: German
- No. of seasons: 3
- No. of episodes: 30

Production
- Running time: 46–50 minutes
- Production companies: Bantry Bay Productions GmbH & Co. KG

Original release
- Network: VOX
- Release: November 9, 2015 – December 11, 2017

Club der roten Bänder (pronounced [ˈklʊp deːɐ̯ ˈʁoːtn̩ ˈbɛndɐ]; literally "Club of red bracelets") is a German comedy-drama television series broadcast on VOX. Based upon the Catalan drama series Polseres vermelles, the series focuses on a group of teenagers living together as patients in a hospital's pediatric ward.

On December 5, 2016, VOX renewed the series for a third and final season. The third season premiered on November 13, 2017. The last episode of the third season aired on December 11, 2017, marking the end of the show.

== Main characters ==
- Tim Oliver Schultz as Leo Roland; he has cancer and has had a leg amputated
- Damian Hardung as Jonas Neumann; he has cancer and has to have a leg amputated
- Luise Befort as Emma Wolfshagen; she has anorexia
- Timur Bartels as Alex Breidtbach; he is admitted to the hospital after fainting on the playground
- Ivo Kortlang as Anton „Toni“ Vogel; he has Asperger's syndrome, he arrives at the hospital because of a motorcycle accident
- Nick Julius Schuck as Hugo Krüger; he is in a coma after jumping off a diving board; he serves as the show's narrator

== Main cast ==
Actor	Character	Role in the club	Season		
Actor	Character	Role in the club	1	2	3
Tim Oliver Schultz	Leo Roland	the leader	Starring	Starring	Starring
Damian Hardung	Jonas Neumann	the second leader	Starring	Starring	Starring
Luise Befort	Emma Wolfshagen	the girl	Starring	Starring	Starring
Timur Bartels	Alex Breidtbach	the attractive one	Starring	Starring	Starring
Ivo Kortlang	Anton „Toni“ Vogel	the smart one	Starring	Starring	Starring
Nick Julius Schuck	Hugo Krüger	good soul	Starring	Starring	Starring

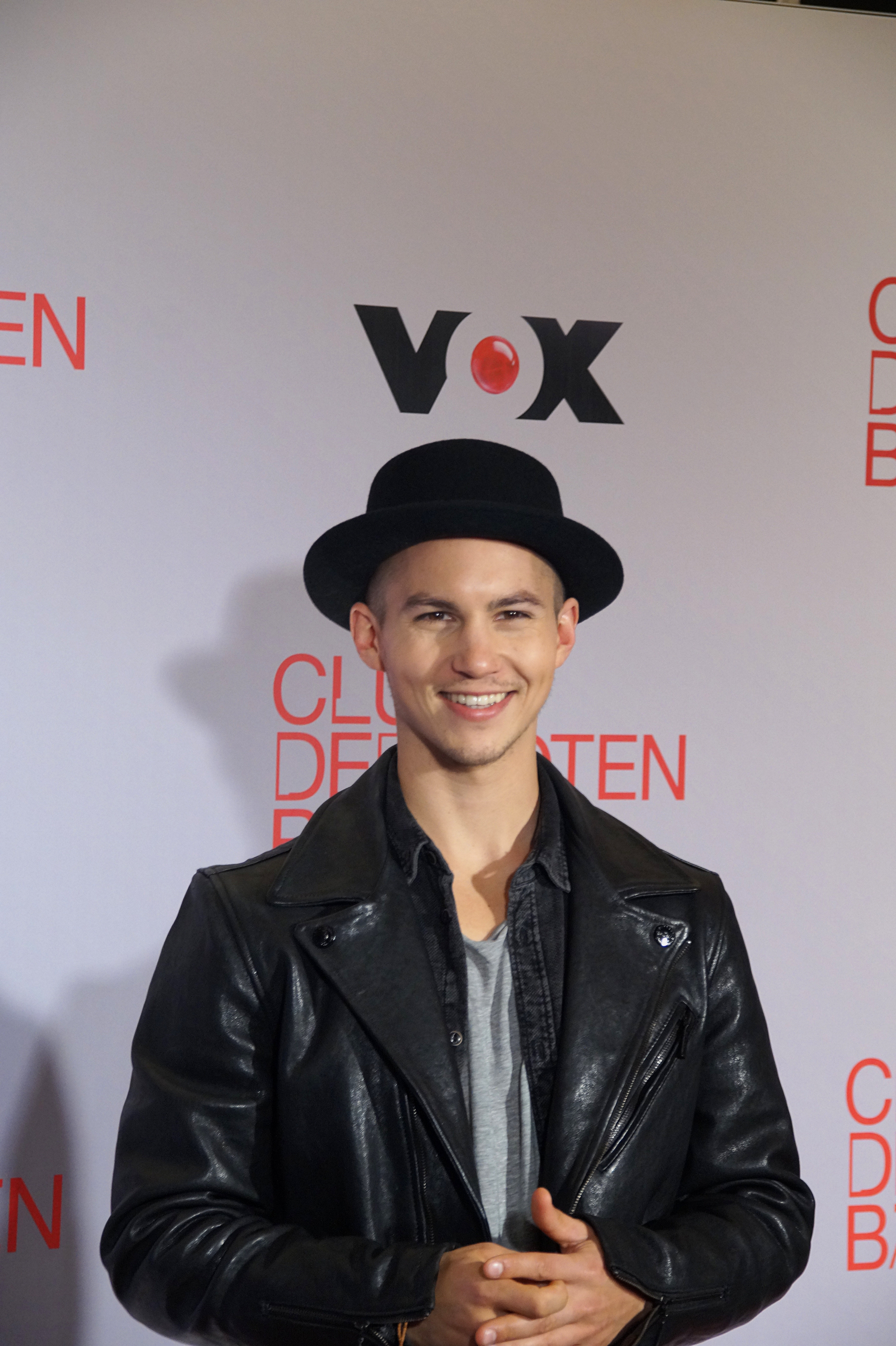
Tim Oliver Schultz (2016)

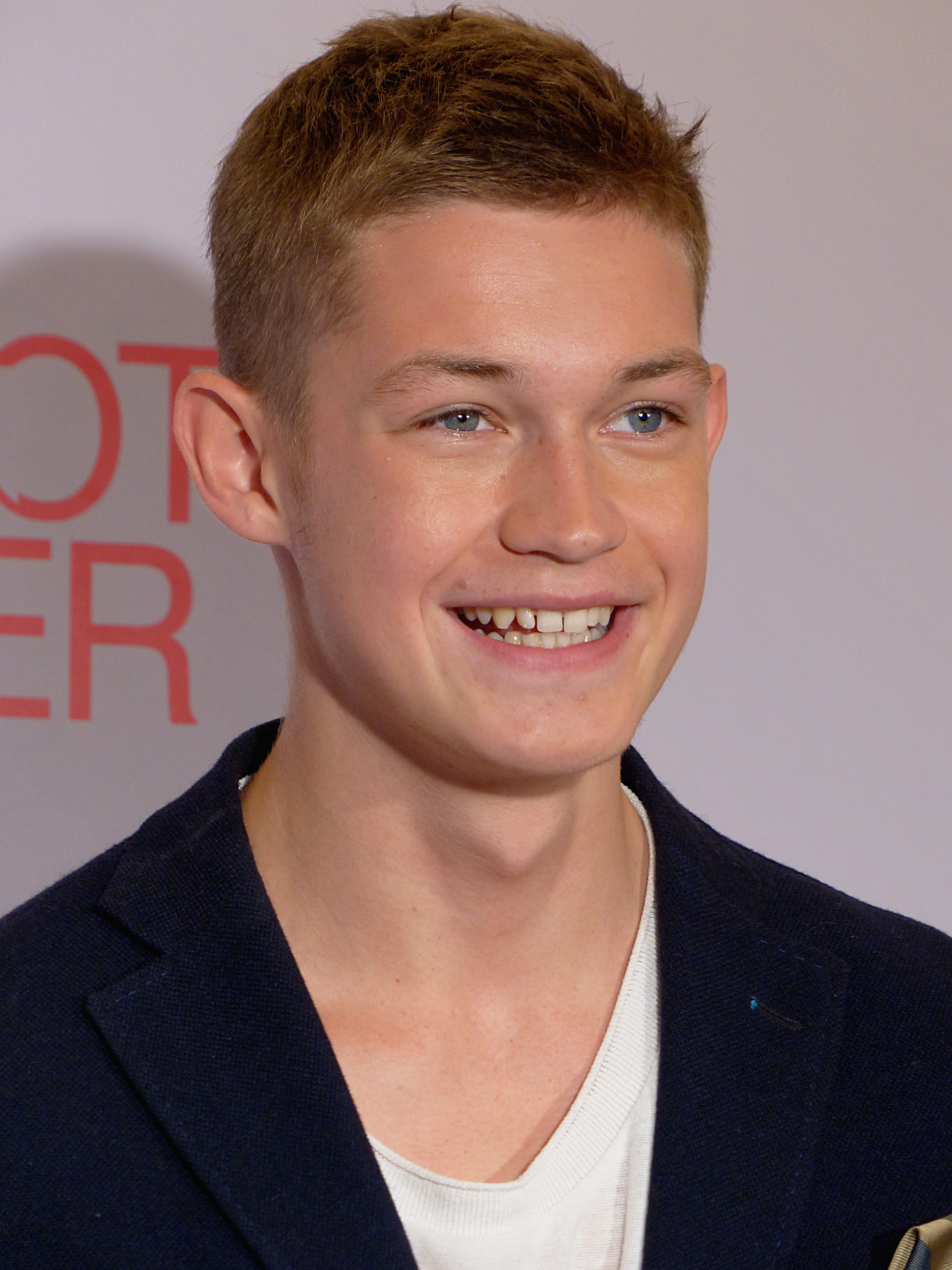
Damian Hardung (2016)

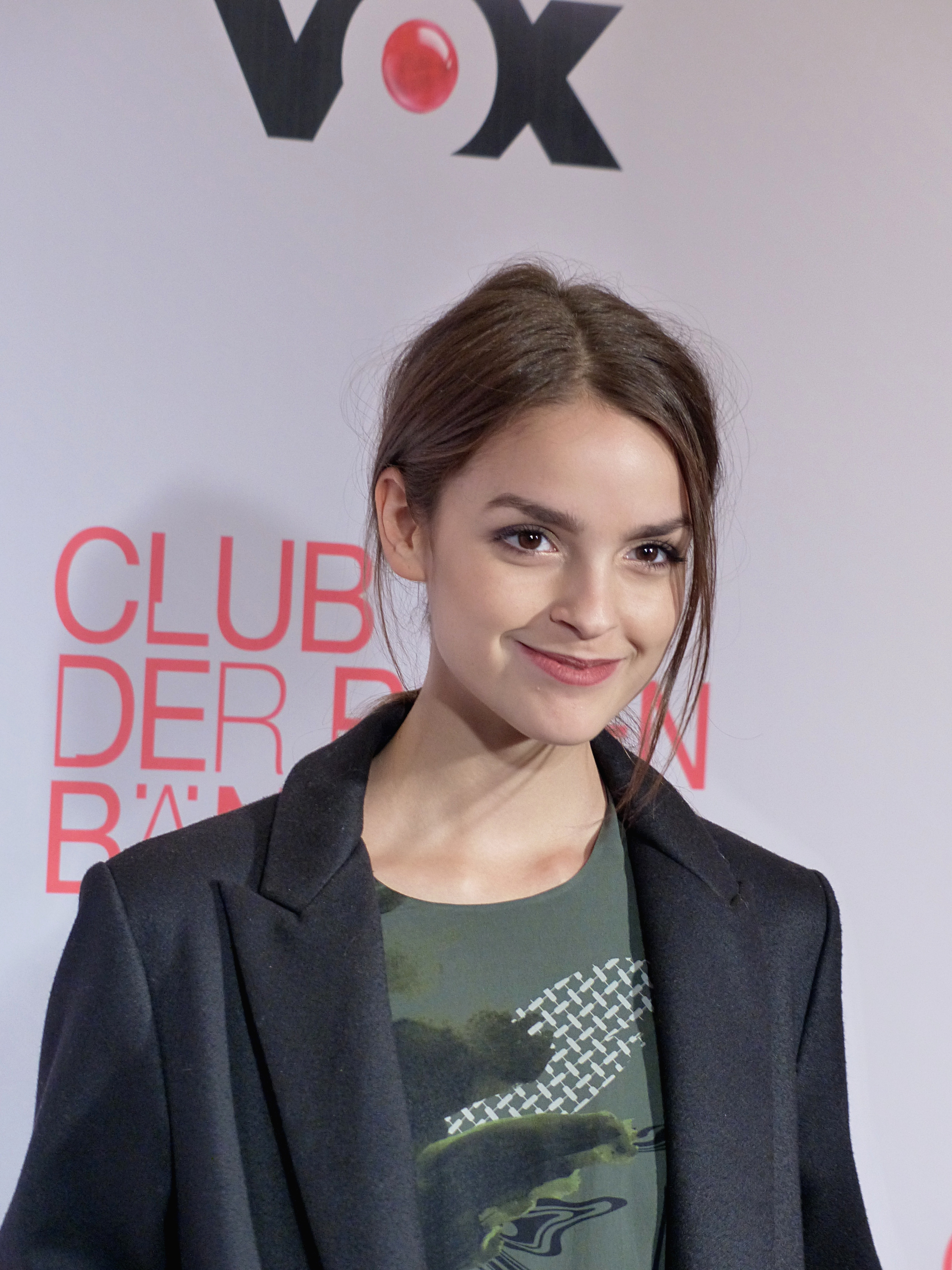
Luise Befort (2016)

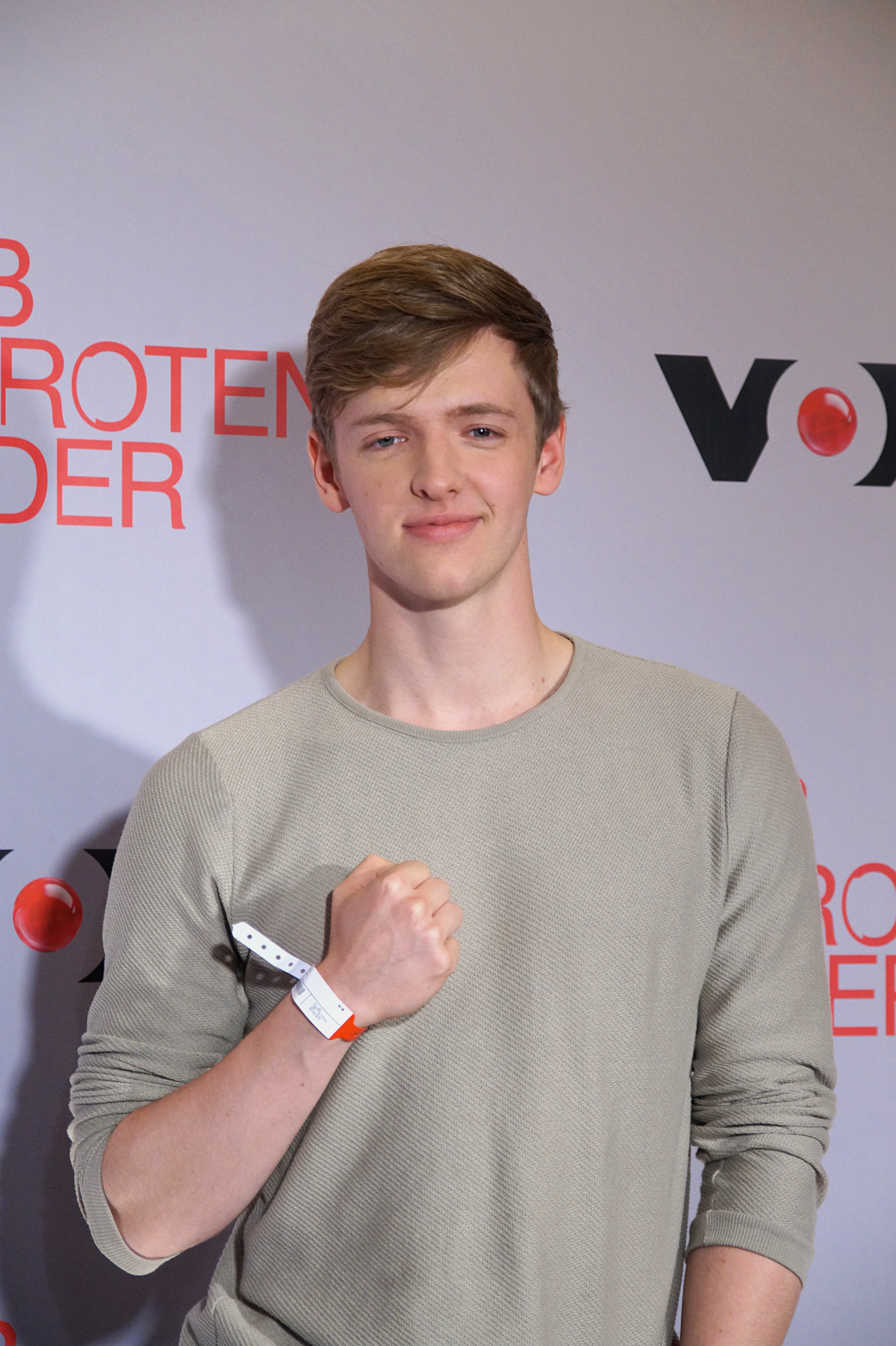
Timur Bartels (2016)

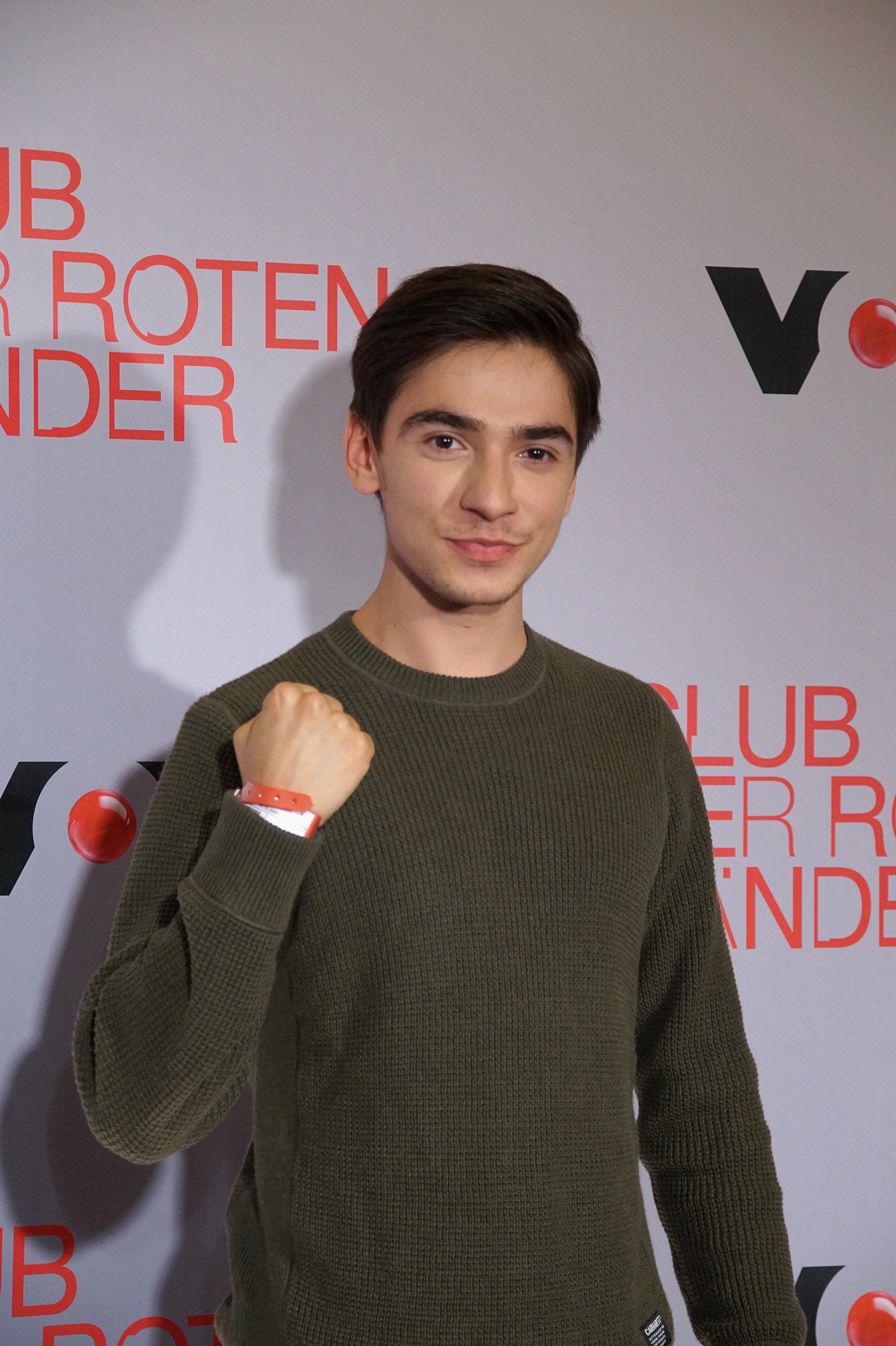
Ivo Kortlang (2016)

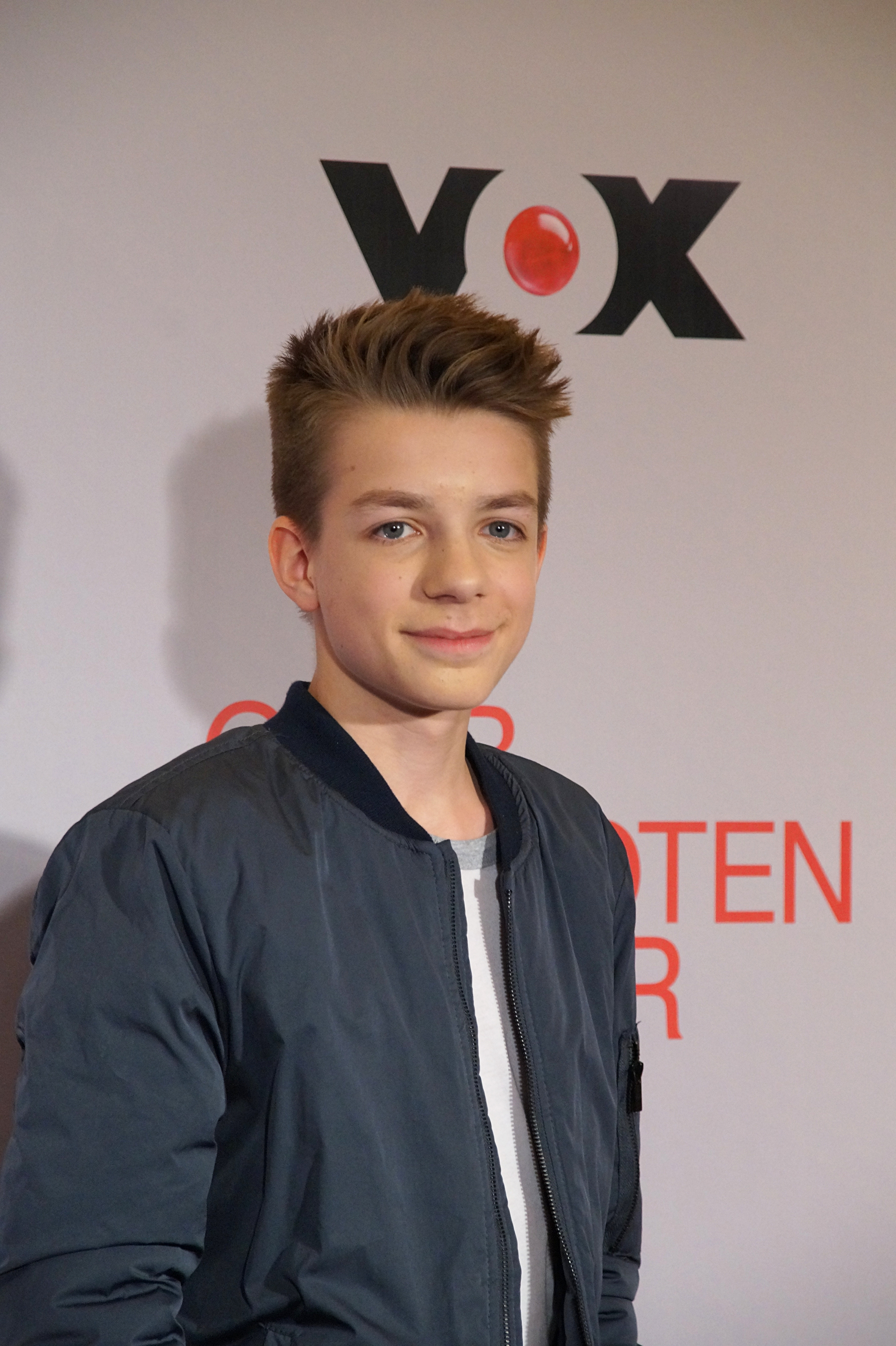
Nick Julius Schuck (2016)

== Episodes ==
Season	Episodes	Originally aired	
Season	Episodes	First aired	Last aired
1	10	November 9, 2015	December 7, 2015
2	10	November 7, 2016	December 5, 2016
3	10	November 13, 2017	December 11, 2017

=== Season 1 (2015) ===
No. overall	No. in season	Title	Directed by	Written by	Original release date	German viewers (millions)
1	1	"Das Schwimmbad"	Richard Huber	Arne Nolting, Jan Martin Scharf	November 9, 2015	2.36
2	2	"Der Club"	Richard Huber	Arne Nolting, Jan Martin Scharf	November 9, 2015	2.46
3	3	"Die Expedition"	Felix Binder	Arne Nolting, Jan Martin Scharf	November 16, 2015	2.53
4	4	"Chemo"	Felix Binder	Arne Nolting, Jan Martin Scharf	November 16, 2015	2.65
5	5	"Sonnenschein"	Andreas Menck	Arne Nolting, Jan Martin Scharf	November 23, 2015	2.30
6	6	"Kometen"	Andreas Menck	Arne Nolting, Jan Martin Scharf	November 23, 2015	2.31
7	7	"Das Bein"	Andreas Menck	Arne Nolting, Jan Martin Scharf	November 30, 2015	2.40
8	8	"Geburtstag"	Sabine Bernardi	Arne Nolting, Jan Martin Scharf	November 30, 2015	2.60
9	9	"Abschied"	Sabine Bernardi	Arne Nolting, Jan Martin Scharf	December 7, 2015	2.54
10	10	"Der Sprung"	Sabine Bernardi	Arne Nolting, Jan Martin Scharf	December 7, 2015	2.71

=== Season 2 (2016) ===
No. overall	No. in season	Title	Directed by	Written by	Original release date	German viewers (millions)
11	1	"Zurück im Leben"	Sabine Bernardi	Arne Nolting, Jan Martin Scharf	November 7, 2016	2.97
12	2	"Das Glück der Anderen"	Sabine Bernardi	Arne Nolting, Jan Martin Scharf	November 7, 2016	3.03
13	3	"Abschiede"	Sabine Bernardi	Arne Nolting, Jan Martin Scharf	November 14, 2016	2.71
14	4	"Vertrauen"	Andreas Menck	Arne Nolting, Jan Martin Scharf	November 14, 2016	2.88
15	5	"Freiheit"	Andreas Menck	Arne Nolting, Jan Martin Scharf	November 21, 2016	2.72
16	6	"Das Grab"	Andreas Menck	Arne Nolting, Jan Martin Scharf	November 21, 2016	2.94
17	7	"Koma"	Felix Binder	Arne Nolting, Jan Martin Scharf	November 28, 2016	2.81
18	8	"Die Wahrheit"	Felix Binder	Arne Nolting, Jan Martin Scharf	November 28, 2016	2.99
19	9	"Versprechen"	Richard Huber	Arne Nolting, Jan Martin Scharf	December 5, 2016	2.93
20	10	"Die Reise"	Richard Huber	Arne Nolting, Jan Martin Scharf	December 5, 2016	3.23

=== Season 3 (2017) ===
No. overall	No. in season	Title	Directed by	Written by	Original release date	German viewers (millions)
21	1	"Die Rückkehr"	Sabine Bernardi	Arne Nolting, Jan Martin Scharf	November 13, 2017	2.37
22	2	"Das Testament"	Sabine Bernardi	Arne Nolting, Jan Martin Scharf	November 13, 2017	2.46
23	3	"Wert des Lebens"	Sabine Bernardi	Arne Nolting, Jan Martin Scharf	November 20, 2017	N/A
24	4	"Lieben und Sterben"	Sabine Bernardi	Arne Nolting, Jan Martin Scharf	November 20, 2017	N/A
25	5	"Schock"	Sabine Bernardi	Arne Nolting, Jan Martin Scharf	November 27, 2017	N/A
26	6	"Ein neues Zuhause"	Sabine Bernardi	Arne Nolting, Jan Martin Scharf	November 27, 2017	N/A
27	7	"Loslassen"	Sabine Bernardi	Arne Nolting, Jan Martin Scharf	December 4, 2017	N/A
28	8	"Die Liste"	Sabine Bernardi	Arne Nolting, Jan Martin Scharf	December 4, 2017	N/A
29	9	"Befreiung"	Sabine Bernardi	Arne Nolting, Jan Martin Scharf	December 11, 2017	N/A
30	10	"Das Vermächtnis"	Sabine Bernardi	Arne Nolting, Jan Martin Scharf	December 11, 2017	N/A

== Reception ==
=== Critical response ===
The reviews in Germany are mostly positive. According to Albert Espinosa the German Version of Polseres vermelles is the best worldwide.

=== Awards ===
2016

- Audi Generation Award 2016 – Media (Medien)
- Bayerischer Fernsehpreis 2016 – Best director (Regisseur) to Richard Huber
- Bayerischer Fernsehpreis 2016 – Best producers (Produzenten) to Bantry Bay Productions, Gerda Müller and Jan Kromschröder
- Deutscher Fernsehpreis 2016 – Best series (Beste Serie)
- Deutscher Schauspielerpreis 2016 – Best ensemble (Bestes Ensemble)
- Eyes & Ears Awards 2016 – Best typographical design (Beste typografische Gestaltung)
- Eyes & Ears Awards 2016 – Best On-Air-Programm-Campaign: Fiction in-house production (Beste On-Air-Programm-Kampagne: Fiction Eigenproduktion)
- Grimme-Preis 2016 – Children & Youth (Kinder & Jugend)
- Jupiter-Award 2016 – Best TV-series national (Beste TV-Serie national)
- New Faces Award Film 2016 – Special Award (Sonderpreis)
- Quotenmeter.de-Fernsehpreis 2016 – Best supporting actress of a series (Nebendarstellerin einer Serie oder Reihe) to Luise Befort

2017

- Deutscher Fernsehpreis 2017 – Best series (Beste Serie)
- Eyes & Ears Awards 2017 – Best social spot or campaign ( Beste(r) Social Spot bzw. Kampagne)
- Jupiter-Award 2017 – Best TV-series national (Beste TV-Serie national)

== See also ==
- List of German television series
- Polseres vermelles
- Red Band Society
- Braccialetti rossi
