= Damian Hardung =

German actor (born 1998)

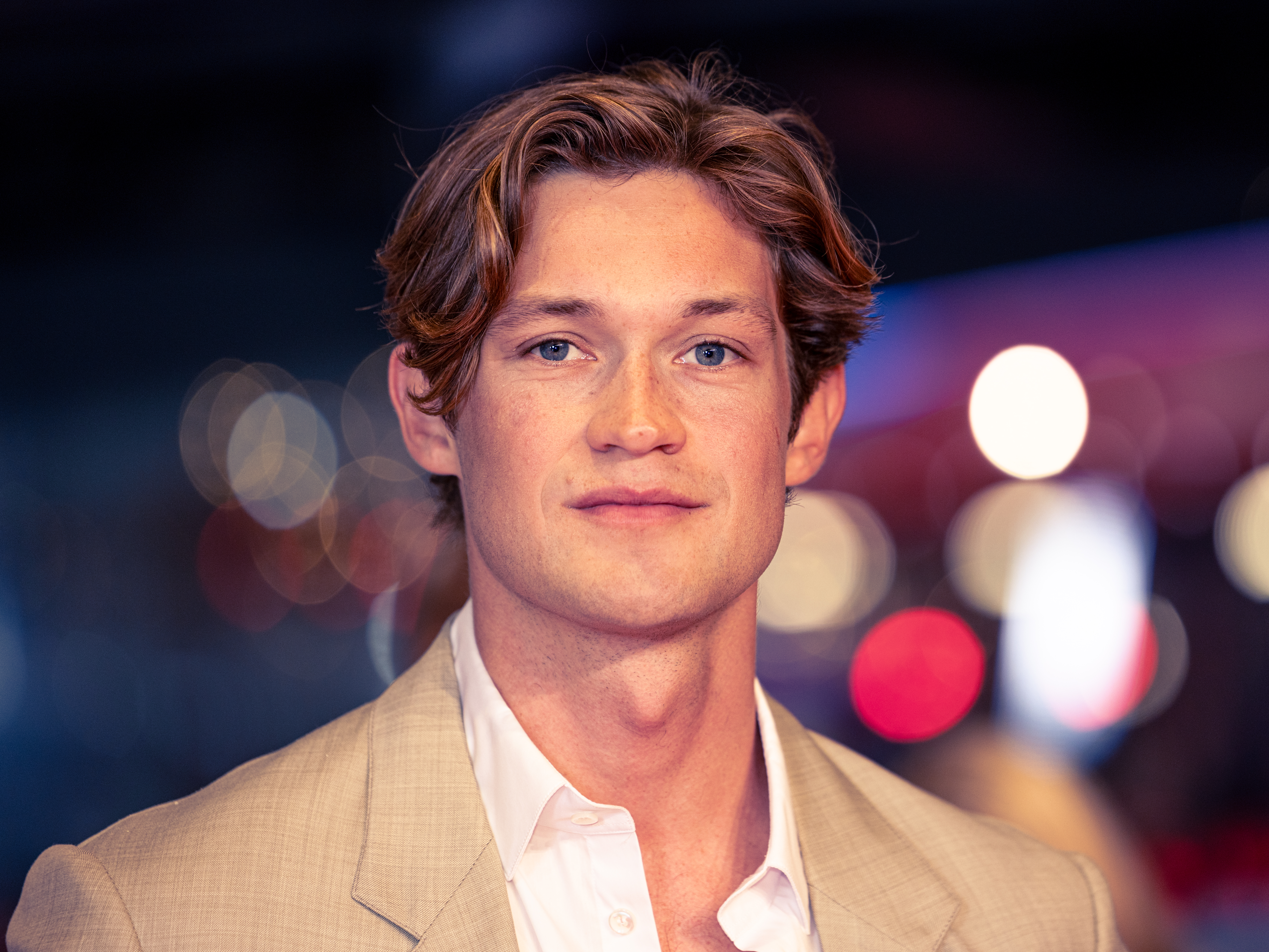
- Hardung in 2025
- Born: 7 September 1998 (age 28); Cologne, Germany
- Education: University of Cologne
- Occupation: Actor
- Years active: 2010–present

Damian Hardung (German: /dɑːmiːən hɑːrduːŋ/ DAH-mee-ən HAR-doong; born 7 September 1998) is a German actor known for his starring roles as Daniel Riffert in the German Netflix series How to Sell Drugs Online (Fast) and James Beaufort in the Amazon Prime Video romantic drama Maxton Hall — The World Between Us.

== Early life ==
Born on 7 September 1998, Hardung is from the city of Cologne. A keen footballer, he was part of the youth academy at SC Fortuna Köln. At the age of 14, he went to New York on a scholarship for gifted students.

== Career ==
Hardung made his acting debut at the age of 12 with a couple of short movies such as Der Magische Umhang and Die Könige der Straße. Further screen appearances followed in Transpapa, Unter Frauen, and Die Holzbaronin. He had his first leading role portraying Thomas in 2013's Clara and the Secret of the Bears.

Between 2015 and 2017, Hardung played Jonas Neumann in all three seasons of the VOX television series Club der roten Bänder. This was followed by a lead role in the 2018 film The Most Beautiful Girl in the World, a modern-day German comedy adaptation of Cyrano de Bergerac. He also appeared in the alien-invasion series Spides.

In March 2019, Hardung starred in the RAI television show The Name of the Rose, as Adso, alongside Rupert Everett and John Turturro. His next role was in the German Netflix series How to Sell Drugs Online (Fast), which aired in May, as Daniel Riffert. Hardung reprised the role in the 2022 spin-off series Buba.

Hardung played Winnie Wolf in the 2023 television series Our Miracle Years. That year, he was cast in a lead role in the television adaptation of Mona Kasten's bestselling novel Save Me. Titled Maxton Hall — The World Between Us, the series was broadcast in 2024 on Amazon Prime Video. It was renewed for a second season in May 2024.

In November 2025, the season 2 of the series was released and at the same time, the shoot of season 3 was completed.

== Personal life ==
Hardung is currently studying medicine in Cologne. He has two brothers, Gabriel and Leon. Leon also studied medicine, and the pair were among those vaccinating the German public during the COVID-19 pandemic. Damian has campaigned with Greenpeace against climate change, visiting Antarctica in 2022.

== Filmography ==
=== Film ===
Year	Name	Role	Notes
2010	Der magische Umhang	Tobren	Short film
2011	Die Könige der Straße	Malten	Short film
2012	Transpapa	Christopher	
2012	Unter Frauen	Alexander Hagen (12 years old)	
2012	Online – Meine Tochter in Gefahr	Lars	
2013	Mord in Eberswalde	Frank Fuhrmann	
2013	Die Holzbaronin	Alfred Brauer (child)	
2013	Clara and the Secret of the Bears	Thomas	
2015	Frauen	Paul	
2016	Der Hodscha und die Piepenkötter	Patrick	
2018	The Most Beautiful Girl in the World	Rick	
2018	Chix – Back on Stage	Paul	
2019	Red Bracelets – The Beginning	Jonas Neumann	
2019	Auerhaus	Hoeppner	
2019	Buba	Daniel Riffert	
2022	War Sailor	Hans	
2023	Stella. A Life.	Manfred Kübler	
2026	Corpus Delicti	Moritz Holl	
TBA	Into the Deep Blue	Nick	Pre-production
TBA	The Lüneburg Variation		Pre-production

=== Television ===
Year	Name	Role	Notes
2015–2017	Club der roten Bänder	Jonas Neumann	30 episodes
2016	SOKO Stuttgart	David Engstrom	1 episode
2019	The Name of the Rose	Adso of Melk	8 episodes
2019–2025	How to Sell Drugs Online (Fast)	Daniel Riffert	24 episodes
2020	Spides	Alexander Wassiljew	4 episodes
2022	Yesterday We Were Still Children	Junger Peter Klettmann	4 episodes
2023	Our Miracle Years	Winnie Wolf	6 episodes
2024	Pauline	Samuel	2 episodes
2024	Love Sucks	Ben von Greifenstein	8 episodes
2024	Softies		5 episodes
2024	Am Ende der Wahrheit	Mischa	TV film
2024–present	Maxton Hall — The World Between Us	James Beaufort	12 episodes

== Awards and nominations ==
Year	Award	Category	Work	Result	Ref.
2016	Günter Strack TV Award	Best Young Actor	Club der roten Bänder	Nominated	
2019	Sarajevo Youth Film Festival	Acting	Red Bracelets – The Beginning	Won	
2024	Subtitle Film Festival	Actor on the Move	—	Won	
2024	Deutscher Fernsehpreis	Best Actor	Maxton Hall — The World Between Us	Nominated	
2025	Jupiter Award	Best Actor (TV & Streaming) – National	Maxton Hall — The World Between Us	Won	
