= Alicia von Rittberg =

German actress (born 1993)

Alicia Gräfin von Rittberg
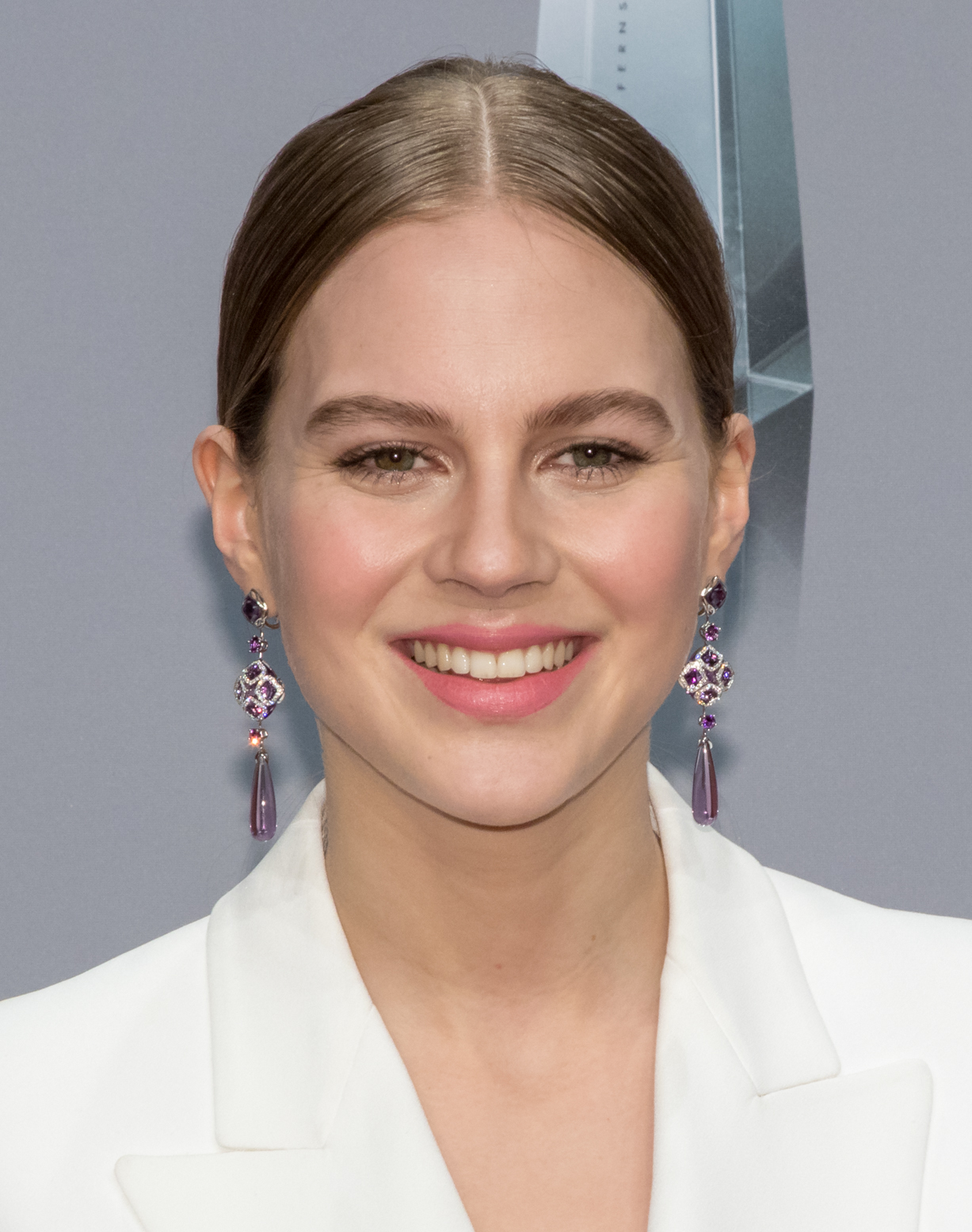
- von Rittberg in 2018
- Born: 10 December 1993 (age 32); Munich, Germany
- Occupation: Actress
- Years active: 2000–present

Alicia Gräfin von Rittberg (born 10 December 1993) is a German actress. Following numerous roles in German films and television series, she came to attention outside Germany for her brief role as Emma in the 2014 film Fury. Rittberg starred as Ida Lenze in the lead role in the German TV series Charité for which she received the Bambi Award in 2017. In 2022, she starred as Elizabeth Tudor in the historical drama Becoming Elizabeth.

== Early life ==
Alicia von Rittberg was born to the formerly noble family of Rittberg and grew up in Munich with three brothers. She attended a humanities-oriented Gymnasium. She studied corporate management and economics at Zeppelin University in Friedrichshafen, where she was due to complete her bachelor's degree thesis in June 2017.

== Career ==
She began her film career while still a student in 2010.

For her starring role as a foster child in the 2012 ZDF TV film And all were silent, she received the 2013 Young Artist Award at the Bavarian Television Award.

In 2014, she co-starred as Emma alongside Brad Pitt, Logan Lerman and Shia LaBeouf in the American war film Fury, directed by David Ayer. She appeared in Our Kind of Traitor, a 2016 spy thriller film directed by Susanna White. She played the lead role of Ida Lenze in season 1 of the German TV series Charité, for which she received the 2017 Bambi Award in the category of German actress. In 2022, she starred as the young Elizabeth Tudor in the historical drama Becoming Elizabeth. and upcoming television series Queen Silvia

== Filmography ==
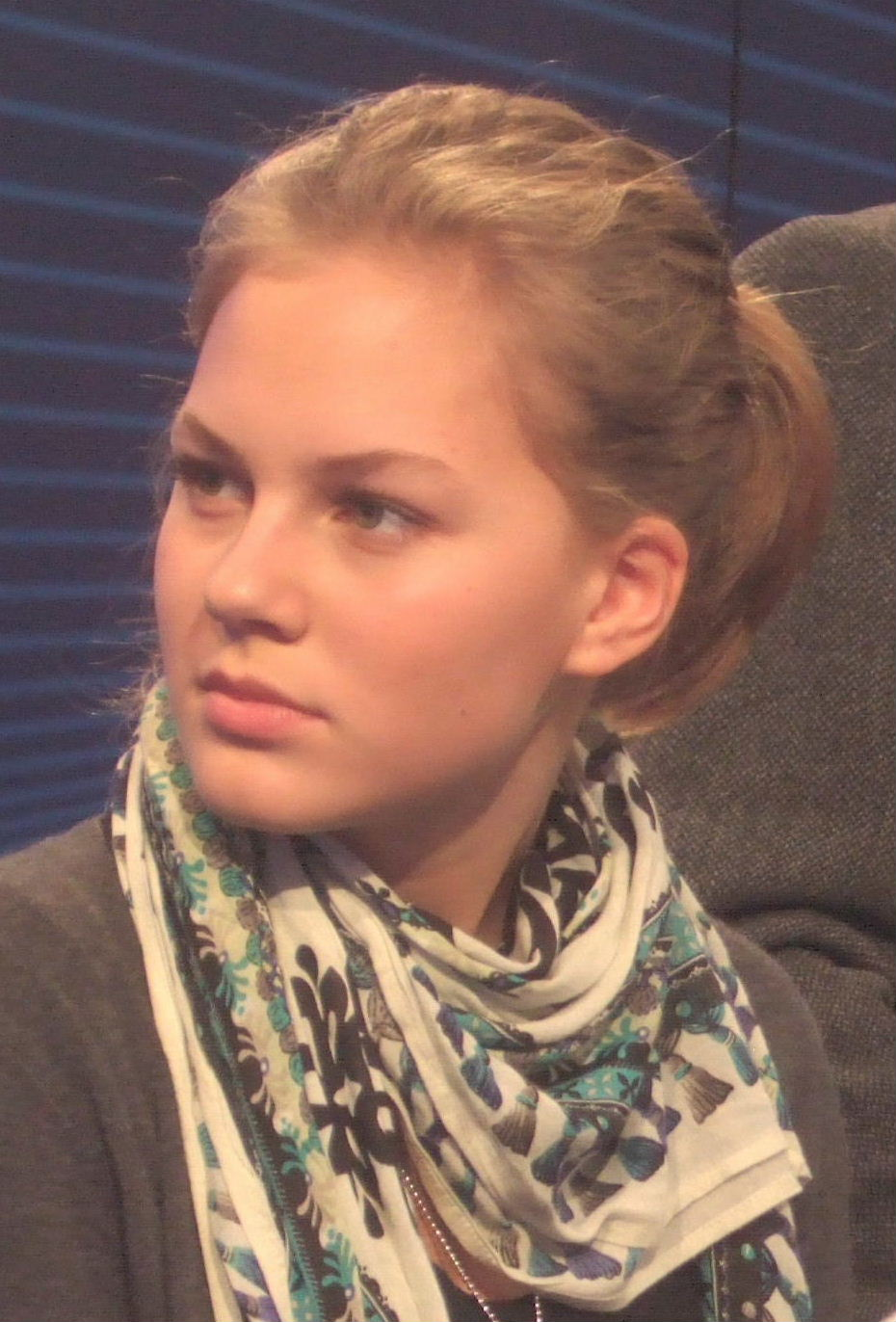
Rittberg on 16 October 2009

=== Film ===
Year	Title	Role
2011	Hot Line	Tina Brandner
2012	Barbara	Angie
2014	Fury	Emma
2016	Our Kind of Traitor	Natasha
2017	Godless Youth	Nadesh
2018	Balloon	Petra Wetzel
2019	Rate Your Date	Teresa
2020	Resistance	Regine
2020	Hello Again: A Wedding a Day	Zazie
2022	Leave	Hunter White

=== Television ===
Year	Title	Role	Notes
2006, 2011	The Old Fox	Jasmin Carnap, Leonie Wintzer	Episode 30x03 - "Tödliches Schweigen" Episode 37x04 - "Zivilcourage"
2007	Die Lawine	Jill Westermann	Television film
2008	Die Sache mit dem Glück	Miriam Heitmann	Television film
2008–2009	Meine wunderbare Familie	Lilly Sander	5 episodes
2009	Romy	Romy - 14 years old	Television film
2010	Das Geheimnis der Wale	Charlotte Waldmann	Television film
2011	Hindenburg: The Last Flight	Gisela Kerner	Television film
2011	Die Verführerin Adele Spitzeder	Therese Ederer	Television film
2012	Und alle haben geschwiegen	Luisa Jung	Television film
2013	Alles für meine Tochter	Clara Liebner	Television film
2014	Unterwegs mit Elsa	Clara Novak	Television film
2014	The Midwife	Lotte	Television film
2014	Die reichen Leichen. Ein Starnbergkrimi	Sisi	Television film
2015	Das Romeo-Prinzip	Annelie	Television film
2016	Die Hebamme 2	Lotte	Television film
2017	Charité	Ida Lenze	6 episodes
2017	Genius	Anna Winteler	4 episodes
2019	Lotte am Bauhaus	Lotte Brendel	Television film
2022	Becoming Elizabeth	Princess Elizabeth Tudor	8 episodes
2024	Bis in die Seele ist mir kalt	Ute Patterer	Television film
2026	Queen Silvia	Silvia Sommerlath	Television series

== Accolades ==
Year	Award	Category	Nominated work	Ref.
2013	Bavarian TV award	Young Artist Award	Und alle haben geschwiegen	
2013	Günter Rohrbach Film Award	Price of Saarland Film GmbH	And all were silent together with Leonard Carow	
2014	New Faces Award	Young Artist Award	Die Hebamme	
2017	Bambi Award	German Actress	Charité	
2019	Seoul International Drama Awards	Best Actress	Lotte am Bauhaus	
