= Our Kind of Traitor (novel) =

2010 novel by John le Carré

- First edition cover
- Author: John le Carré
- Language: English
- Publisher: Viking Press
- Publication date: 16 September 2010
- Publication place: United Kingdom
- Media type: Print (hardcover and paperback)
- Pages: 320
- ISBN: 0-670-91901-2
- LC Class: PR6062.E33 L43 2010

Our Kind of Traitor, published in 2010, is a novel by the British author John le Carré, about a Russian money launderer seeking to defect after his close friend is killed by his new superiors.

== Plot summary ==
On a tennis holiday in Antigua, British university lecturer Peregrine "Perry" Makepiece and his lawyer girlfriend Gail Perkins meet mysterious Russian oligarch Dmitri "Dima" Vladimirovich Krasnov and his family. Dima, who describes himself as "the world's number one money launderer", deliberately sought contact with Perry hoping that he is a British spy or knows one. This is because Dima wants Perry to pass on information about his criminal activities to British intelligence in exchange for protection for himself and his family. Dima fears for his life because "The Prince", the new leader of his criminal brotherhood, had a good friend of Dima and his wife murdered. The Prince now wants Dima to come to Bern to sign over control of the money laundering operation to him.

Back in the UK, Perry reaches out to a colleague with contacts in British intelligence and hands over Dima's notes. Since these implicate a high-ranking decision maker in the UK, British intelligence decides to put government fixer Hector Meredith in charge of a secret semi-official investigation. Hector recruits disgraced intelligence officer Luke Weaver to handle the investigation. Luke, eager to redeem himself, makes all the necessary arrangements. Dima insists that Perry and Gail be present during his first contact with British intelligence in Paris during the 2009 Roland Garros final, so the couple travel there and reunite with Dima and his family.

After Dima signs the papers handing over his assets to a representative of "The Prince", he meets with Luke and is extracted, along with his family, to a safe house in the Swiss Alps. They wait there until British intelligence insists that only Dima travel to the UK; his family will be allowed to join him later if his information proves correct. Dima reluctantly agrees and travels with Luke to catch the charter plane that is supposed to bring them to the UK, only to be killed as the plane explodes shortly after take-off.

== Reception ==
The New York Times reviewer Michiko Kakutani described it as "part vintage John le Carré and part Alfred Hitchcock", calling it the author's most thrilling thriller in years. James Naughtie, writing for The Telegraph, praised le Carré's dialogue, saying his "greatest gift may be his ear, which allows him to pick up a tremor of fear in the softest voice or a false note in any exchange of words and play with them to his heart’s content. He can therefore create, in dialogue, a trembling soundscape that has a pitch-perfect quality." While praising the book, The Guardian's Christopher Tayler wrote: "By this stage of his career, Le Carré seems more interested in the telling than the tale, and in the actors more than in their actions. But his deft setting up of colourful characters, and slightly less deft meshing of psychology and plot requirements, doesn't always make for narrative tension. The long, fussily narrated opening, in particular, takes nearly 100 pages to get the reader hooked."

== Film adaptation ==
British director Susanna White made a film adaptation in 2016, based on a screenplay by Hossein Amini. Starring Ewan McGregor, Naomie Harris, Stellan Skarsgård, Damian Lewis, and Alicia von Rittberg, the film was released in the United Kingdom on 13 May 2016.
