= Maxton Hall—The World Between Us =

German television series

- Promotional poster
- German: Maxton Hall — Die Welt zwischen uns
- Genre: Romance
- Based on: Save Me by Mona Kasten
- Directed by: Martin Schreier; Tarek Roehlinger
- Starring: Harriet Herbig-Matten; Damian Hardung; Sonja Weißer; Ben Felipe; Fedja van Huêt
- Country of origin: Germany
- Original language: German
- No. of series: 2
- No. of episodes: 12

Production
- Executive producers: Markus Brunnemann; Ceylan Yildirim
- Producer: Valentin Debler
- Cinematography: Christof Wahl
- Production company: UFA Fiction

Original release
- Network: Amazon Prime Video
- Release: 9 May 2024 – present

Maxton Hall—The World Between Us (German: Maxton Hall — Die Welt zwischen uns) is a German television series on Amazon Prime Video. It is based on the 2018 novel Save Me by Mona Kasten. It stars Damian Hardung as James Beaufort and Harriet Herbig-Matten as Ruby Bell. The series premiered on May 9, 2024, and had the most successful series launch of any non-American Prime Original ever, becoming the most popular series on Prime Video worldwide shortly after its release by ranking #1 in the charts in over 120 regions.

In June 2025, the series was renewed for a third and final season which is slated to premiere on December 9, 2026.

== Plot ==
=== Season 1 ===
Ruby Bell, a brilliant and determined young woman, enters the opulent world of Maxton Hall on a scholarship. Her singular focus is securing a place at Oxford University, a stark contrast to the carefree extravagance of her wealthy classmates. Among them is James Beaufort, an arrogant heir, whose life revolves around privilege.

After forgetting to submit a document for her referral letter to Mr Sutton, a teacher at the school, she stumbles upon Lydia Beaufort having a secret affair with Mr. Sutton. Lydia thinks Ruby will expose her relationship, so she resorts to her brother James for help. James attempts to buy out Ruby, who in turn refuses all of his attempts.

Ruby then requests the school headmaster, Mr. Lexington, for the letter in place of Mr. Sutton since she no longer holds him in high regard as she did before. She informs Mr. Lexington that she is the chairman for the event organisation committee, so he makes a deal with Ruby that if she manages to pull off the upcoming event aimed to attract new potential students successfully, he would consider writing her letter.

Mr. Sutton breaks up with Lydia even after she begs him to keep things the way they are. The party progresses smoothly until the strippers James invited to ruin Ruby's event show up, since he believes that Ruby has underlying intentions to ruin the Beaufort family with Lydia's secret.

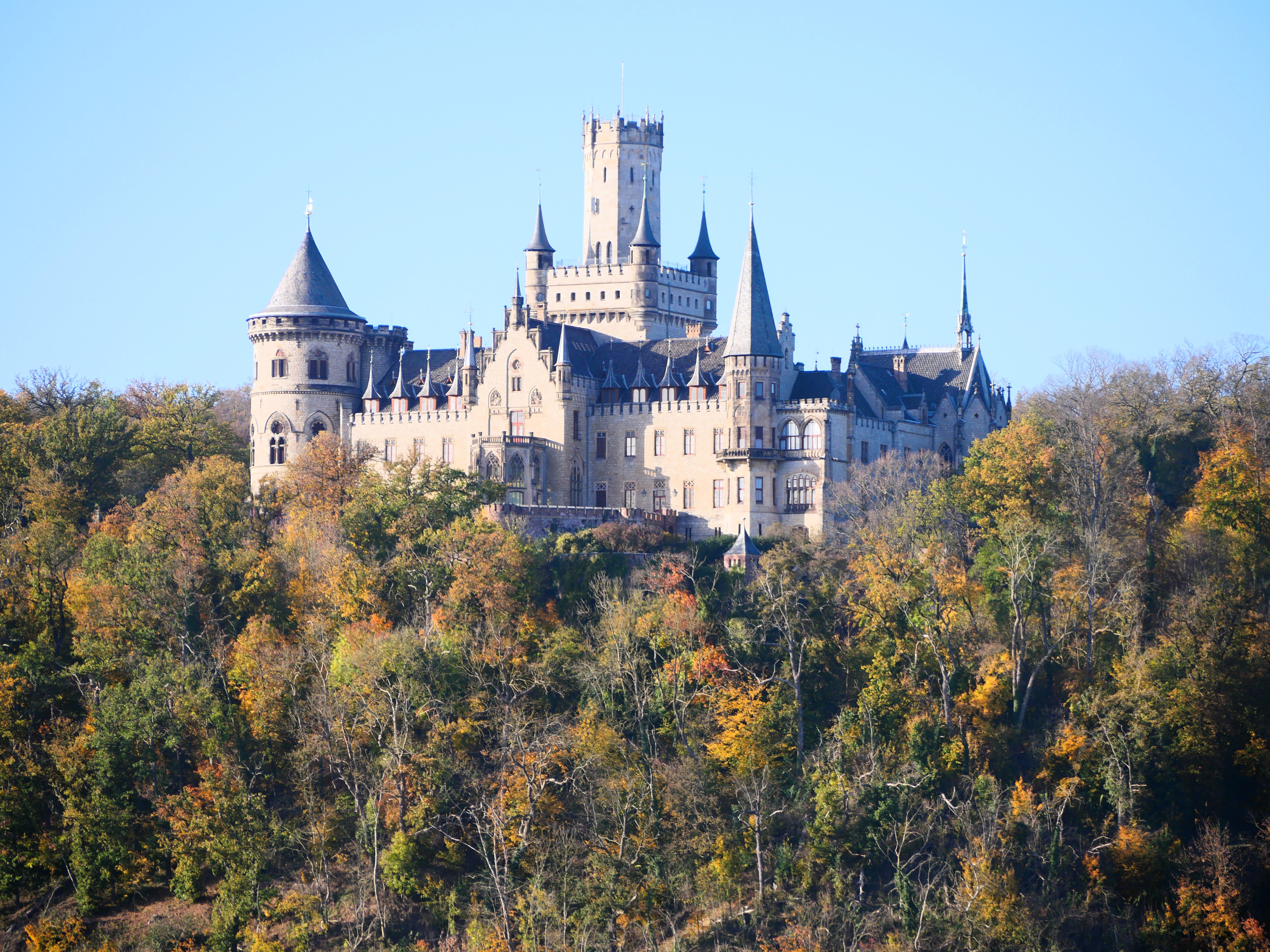
Marienburg Castle near Hannover (Germany)—the former summer residence of the House of Welf served as the filming location for the school of Maxton Hall.

The headmaster is enraged and takes James off the lacrosse team and denies Ruby her letter. However, he is willing to reverse his decision if Ruby and James manage to throw a successful donor gala for the school. After the initial phase of animosity, Ruby and James begin to bond over the next few weeks with James helping out to the best of his ability.

James prepares for the 'Young Beaufort' line, an idea that Lydia had come up with and worked hard on for years. However, their father saw Lydia unfit to lead as future CEO. Unfortunately, the press conference clashes with the gala—which James had promised Ruby that he'd attend since it was her birthday as well. After an intense conversation with his father forcing him to go to the conference, James makes a decision in the spur of the moment when rehearsing lines with Lydia in the car, and decides to go to the gala.

James' father's wrath knows no bounds when he discovers his son's relationship with Ruby since he catches them kissing in the basement of the gala. He views her as beneath them and resorts to blackmail, threatening to destroy Ruby's future to force James to break things off. Heartbroken and desperate to protect Ruby, James makes the agonising decision to end their relationship.

Having seen Lydia at the gala, Mr. Sutton approaches her and asks her to elope with him. They agree to meet the following Thursday. However, Lydia decides to stay at a photoshoot with her family, leaving Mr. Sutton heartbroken and their escape dreams shattered. Just as they all attempt to create lives without their true loves, Lydia discovers she's pregnant with Mr. Sutton's child.

During the Oxford colleges interview period, a second year student seemingly takes a liking to Ruby. James is overcome with jealousy as he watches the two get close at a bar. Ruby publicly lashes out at him for talking down to the student at an Oxford student Q&A. They have an angry confrontation in which James comes to a realisation that he has never once done what he wanted for himself. James kisses Ruby in retaliation but Ruby asks James why he had ignored her up until then, to which he explains his dad's threats. They reconcile and have sex, Ruby nails her interviews, and James doesn't attend his final interview.

Upon arrival back home, James and Lydia are informed that their mother has died. James becomes angry at his father for his demeanour and tackles him. Dragged off his father by his driver, James storms away, walking the streets. He finds himself in front of Ruby's house, but after seeing her happy with her family, he walks away, and the season ends.

== Episodes ==
Season	Episodes	Originally released	
Season	Episodes	First released	Last released
1	6	May 9, 2024	
2	6	November 7, 2025	November 28, 2025

=== Season 1 (2024) ===
No. overall	No. in season	Title	Directed by	Teleplay by	Original release date
1	1	"Unterm Radar" "Under the Radar"	Martin Schreier	Daphne Ferraro	May 9, 2024
2	2	"Adel verpflichtet" "Noblesse Oblige"	Martin Schreier	Daphne Ferraro and Marc Schießer	May 9, 2024
3	3	"Bloßgestellt" "Exposed"	Martin Schreier	Daphne Ferraro and Marlene Melchior	May 9, 2024
4	4	"Stunde der Wahrheit" "The Moment of Truth"	Tarek Roehlinger	Daphne Ferraro and Zoe Magdalena	May 9, 2024
5	5	"Im Auge des Sturms" "In the Eye of the Storm"	Tarek Roehlinger	Daphne Ferraro, Nina Rathke and Anna Schimrigk	May 9, 2024
6	6	"Ein Stück vom Glück" "A Piece of Happiness"	Tarek Roehlinger	Daphne Ferraro and Juliana Lima Dehne	May 9, 2024

=== Season 2 (2025) ===
No. overall	No. in season	Title	Directed by	Teleplay by	Original release date
7	1	"Am Boden zerstört" "Devastated"	Martin Schreier	Ceylan Yildirim	November 7, 2025
8	2	"Wunsch ans Universum" "Wish to the Universe"	Martin Schreier	Juliana Lima Dehne	November 7, 2025
9	3	"Wechselbad der Gefühle" "Emotional Rollercoaster"	Martin Schreier	Marlene Melchior	November 7, 2025
10	4	"Geheimnisse" "Secrets"	Martin Schreier	Juliana Lima Dehne	November 14, 2025
11	5	"Trügerische Leichtigkeit" "Deceptive Lightness"	Martin Schreier	Marlene Melchior	November 21, 2025
12	6	"Griff nach den Sternen" "Reaching for the Stars"	Martin Schreier	Ceylan Yildirim	November 28, 2025

== Cast and characters ==
=== Main ===
- Damian Hardung as James Beaufort: a legacy student at Maxton Hall, Ruby's boyfriend, Lydia's twin brother
- Harriet Herbig-Matten as Ruby Bell: a scholarship student at Maxton Hall, preparing for Oxford, James' girlfriend

=== Recurring ===
- Sonja Weißer as Lydia Beaufort: a legacy student at Maxton Hall, James' twin sister, Graham's girlfriend
- Eidin Jalali as Graham Sutton: Teacher at Maxton Hall, Lydia's boyfriend
- Fedja van Huêt as Mortimer Beaufort: James and Lydia's father, Cordelia's husband
- Justus Riesner as Alistair Ellington: a student at Maxton Hall, Elaine's brother, James' best friend, Keshav's boyfriend
- Thomas Douglas as Professor Lexington
- Andrea Guo as Lin Wang: a student at Maxton Hall, Ruby's best friend
- Runa Greiner as Ember Bell: Ruby's sister, Helen and Angus' daughter
- Martin Neuhaus as Angus Bell: Ruby and Ember's father, Helen's husband
- Julia-Maria Köhler as Helen Bell: Ruby and Ember's mother, Angus' wife
  - Gina Henkel replaced Maria Köhler
- Ben Felipe as Cyril Vega: a student at Maxton Hall, James' friend, Lydia's one-sided admirer
- Govinda Gabriel Cholleti as Keshav "Kesh" Patel: a student at Maxton Hall, Alistair's boyfriend, James' friend
- Clelia Sarto as Cordelia Beaufort: James and Lydia's mother, Mortimer's wife
- Eli Riccardi as Elaine Ellington: a student at Maxton Hall, Alistair's sister, James's one-sided admirer
- Dagny Dewath as Ophelia Beaufort
- Proschat Madani as Alice Campbell
- Anna Lucia Gustmann as May Clancey: Alice's perfectionist assistant
- Basil Eidenbenz as Frederick Ellington, Alistair and Elaine's brother
- Laura de Boer as Mortimer Beaufort’s new assistant
- Kiro Ebra as Forest

== Production ==
The six-part series, directed by Martin Schreier and Tarek Roehlinger, was recorded in 2022. The series is produced by Markus Brunnemann and Valentin Debler, and executive produced by Ceylan Yildirim for UFA Fiction. Daphne Ferraro is the head writer.

The cast is led by Damian Hardung as James and Harriet Herbig-Matten as Ruby, and also includes Sonja Weißer, Ben Felipe, Fedja van Huêt, Runa Greiner, Justus Riesner, Clelia Sarto, Andrea Guo, Eidin Jalali.

Filming took place mainly in Germany between the beginning of July and the end of September 2022. The filming location for the private school Maxton Hall was the Marienburg Castle. In Potsdam, Brandenburg's state capital and UNESCO city of film, scenes were shot at the Old Market Square: The St. Nicholas Church represents the University of Oxford and the Museum Barberini serves as the London representative of the Beaufort company. The Potsdam City Palace can also be seen. Party scenes were filmed at a villa in the Neubabelsberg villa colony, Ruby's family house is located in the New Garden. The Beaufort family seat is represented by the manor house Ganz in Kyritz. In England, small scenes were filmed in London and Oxford.

The series was renewed for a second season in May 2024 after achieving the largest ever first week global viewership for an international original on Amazon Prime Video. Filming for the second season took place in Berlin and London in the summer of 2024 with Tarek Roehlinger and Martin Schreier returning as directors.

In June 2025, ahead of the premiere of the second season, the series was renewed for a third and final season.

== Release ==
The first season premiered on May 9, 2024 on Amazon Prime Video. The second season premiered on November 7, 2025. The third and final season is scheduled to premiere on December 9, 2026.

== Reception ==
For the first season, the review aggregator website Rotten Tomatoes reported a 70% critics rating based on 10 reviews, with an average rating of 4.5/10.
