= Planet in Focus =

Canadian film festival

- Planet in Focus Festival Logo
- Location: Toronto, Ontario, Canada
- Founded: 1999 by Mark Haslam
- Awards received: 2007 Green Toronto Awards: Leadership, 2008 Green Toronto Awards: Environmental Awareness
- Awards: Eco Hero Awards, Mark Haslam Award, Best Green Pitch, Best Canadian Short, Best International Short, Best Canadian Long, Best International Long.
- Hosted by: Planet in Focus Environmental Film Festival
- No. of films: 100+
- Language: International
- Website: http://www.planetinfocus.org/

Planet in Focus is an environmental film festival based in Toronto, Ontario, Canada.

== History ==
Planet in Focus is an incorporated not-for-profit environmental film organization founded in 1999, by festival director Mark Haslam. They are affiliated with the Planet in Focus Foundation, a registered charitable organization.

Planet in Focus operates year-round to produce the annual Environmental Film Festival every October, as well as national and international film touring programs and a summer youth video production camp.

Their honorary patrons are the scientist, environmentalist and broadcaster David Suzuki, and philosopher, environmental activist and eco-feminist Vandana Shiva.

== Notable films ==
Notable films screened at the festival have included:

- 10 Billion: What's on Your Plate? - Valentin Thurn
- After the Last River - Victoria Lean
- Bad Coyote - Jason Andrew Young
- The Birdman of Cooper Island - Kevin McMahon
- Blue Gold: World Water Wars - Sam Bozzo
- Bombhunters - Sky Fitzgerald
- Dead Before Dawn - April Mullen
- Everest Dark - Jereme Watt
- Fairy Creek - Jen Muranetz
- Geographies of Solitude - Jacquelyn Mills
- The Ghosts in Our Machine - Liz Marshall
- The Gold of Others (L'Or des autres) - Simon Plouffe
- Happy People: A Year in the Taiga - Werner Herzog
- Heart of Sky, Heart of Earth - Frauke Sandig, Eric Black
- The Magnitude of All Things - Jennifer Abbott
- Nechako: It Will Be a Big River Again - Lyana Patrick
- Nuisance Bear - Jack Weisman, Gabriela Osio Vanden
- One Water - Ali Habashi, Sanjeev Chatterjee
- perfectly a strangeness - Alison McAlpine
- Powerful: Energy for Everyone - David Chernushenko
- Score: A Hockey Musical - Avi Federgreen
- Theater of Life - Peter Svatek
- Umbrella - Du Haibin
- Waghoba: Provider, Destroyer, Deity - Malaika Vaz
- Water on the Table - Liz Marshall
- Welcome Aboard Toxic Airlines - Tristan Loraine
- The Whale - Suzanne Chisholm
- Yanuni - Richard Ladkani

== See also ==
- List of environmental film festivals
