= 10 Billion: What's on Your Plate? =

2015 film

- 10 Milliarden – Wie werden wir alle satt?
- Directed by: Valentin Thurn
- Written by: Sebastian Stobbe; Valentin Thurn
- Produced by: Jürgen Kleinig, Tina Leeb, Valentin Thurn, Ira von Gienanth
- Music by: Joachim Dürbeck; René Dohmen
- Release date: 16 April 2015 (Germany)
- Running time: 107 minutes
- Country: Germany
- Languages: German, French, English

10 Billion: What's on Your Plate? (German: 10 Milliarden – Wie werden wir alle satt?) is a documentary film released in 2015 by Valentin Thurn about solutions to supply the future world population with food. It was the most viewed documentary film in 2015 in German cinemas.

== Content ==
In 2050 the Earth's population will most probably reach approximately 10 billion people. To look for an answer to the question of whether it is possible to supply food for the whole world population, Valentin Thurn travels to different spots in the world in search of ecologically and economically responsible alternatives to the mass means by which most of our food is currently produced.

He visits a seed farm in India, an insect farm in Thailand, food cooperatives in the United States, Germany and the United Kingdom, both small and large farming projects in Africa and industrial food producers in Japan. He discovers the complexity of producing and transporting food and its dependence on vulnerable markets.

Small farmers, especially in newly industrialized countries and developing countries, stand in competition with the industrial food production. The message that arises from all these interactions is about the huge difference that small-scale agriculture and eating locally produced food as often as possible can make. According to Thurn, these are the only viable options in resolving the problems of the future.

== Reception ==
Academic Brandon West praised the film, mentioning that while it "could have easily used scare tactics to pique viewer interest, [...] Thurn presents an interesting and well-balanced perspective". He goes on to recommend it for academic purposes, claiming that the "narration of the events and concepts provide ample details, while respecting the intelligence of the audience." Writing for Glam Adelaide, Jo Vabolis gave the film a 10/10 rating, while describing it as "equal parts enthralling and confronting" and "essential viewing" for all those being kept awake at night by the ramifications of population growth.

The film has been used as academic material, with Planet in Focus releasing a teacher's guide that provides "a brief social and scientific background on the issues covered in the film".

== Awards ==
- IDFA 2015, Official Selection Panorama, Netherlands
- Best Documentary Film, 4th Peace and Love Film Festival, Sweden
- 31st Agro Film festival, Slovakia
- Darßer Naturfilm Festival, Hajo Schomerus Jury Award for extraordinary performances in camerawork
- Darßer Naturfilm Festival, Award of the Children's jury
- 5th Life Sciences Film Festival, Prague, Award of the Faculty of Agrobiology, Food, and Resources

== See also ==
- We Feed the World
- Our Daily Bread (2005 film)
- Food, Inc.
