= AWARE: Glimpses of Consciousness =

Documentary Film on consciousness research

- Directed by: Frauke Sandig, Eric Black
- Written by: Frauke Sandig, Eric Black
- Produced by: Frauke Sandig, Eric Black
- Starring: Monica Gagliano, Roland Griffiths, Christof Koch, Richard Boothby, Josefa Kirvin Kulix, Matthieu Ricard and Mingyur Rinpoche
- Cinematography: Black
- Edited by: Franziska von Berlepsch, Rune Schweitzer
- Music by: Zoë Keating
- Distributed by: Area23a, Piffl Medien
- Release date: September 24, 2021
- Running time: 102 min.
- Countries: Germany, US
- Language: English

Aware: Glimpses of Consciousness is a 2021 documentary film about consciousness directed by Frauke Sandig and Eric Black (Germany / USA). The theatrical release in Germany was on September 2, in the US on September 24, 2021. Nationwide broadcast premiere on PBS's “Independent Lens” on April 25, 2022.

== Content ==
The film searches for the origin and essence of consciousness asking the Big Questions: What is consciousness? Is it in all living beings? What happens when we die? Why do we seem to be hardwired for mystical experience? Aware brings six passionate consciousness researchers into dialogue with each other: the famous brain researcher Christof Koch, head of the Allen Brain Institute, who is creating an atlas of the brain; the Buddhist monk Matthieu Ricard, who is exploring consciousness from within; the psychedelic researcher Roland Griffiths, who sends "psychonauts" like philosophy professor Richard Boothby on journeys to "inner space"; the plant researcher Monica Gagliano, who is investigating the cognitive abilities and behaviour of plants; and the Mayan healer Josefa Kirvin Kulix, who sees consciousness as the all-connecting force in nature. Scientists are coming to new insights, some of which have been integral to Indigenous knowledge for millennia. AWARE is the second part in the Heart of Sky, Heart of Earth-Trilogy.

== Reception ==
On review aggregator website Rotten Tomatoes, the film has a 100% approval rating based on 6 reviews. Valerie Kalfrin writes in her review for the Alliance of Women Film Journalists: "Aware: Glimpses of Consciousness is a heady experience – dare I say spiritual? – that stirs feelings of awe and wonder, humility and connection... the film creates a contemplative openness that words alone might find hard to describe. It's a remarkable film." Michael Rechtshaffen in the Los Angeles Times states:" "Science and spirituality join forces in the mindful if heavily meditative documentary, Aware: Glimpses of Consciousness... The investigation brings together individuals from both disciplines to provide colorful perspective." And Bradley Gibson concludes in Film Threat: "Whether it's an elephant finding amusement at play or a deep introspective psychedelics-induced journey into inner space to find meaning, the film surfaces existential mysteries at the core of the human experience in an entertaining and enlightening fashion." And Peter Keough writes in the Boston Globe: "Perhaps you don't need to rely on the latest A.I. technology to attain immortality. The scientists in Frauke Sandig and Eric Black's `Aware: Glimpses of Consciousness´ don't try to reconstruct a mind artificially to uncover its secrets. They examine the evidence that exists, physical and spiritual, in hopes of learning how consciousness works — and how it can be extended.

== Awards ==
- Feature Competition Jury Prize, Illuminate Film Festival 2021
- Online-Audience Award at Millenium Docs Against Gravity Film Festival, Poland 2021
- Shortlist German Academy Awards 2021
- Qualified for the Oscars 2022
- Audience Award "Create the Future Award" at Maui Film Festival 2021
- Premio Pukañawi 2022, Best International Film, Human Rights Film Festival Bolivia
- Prize of the Jury, Science Film Festival 2022
- Wisdom Award, Auroville Film Festival 2024

== See also ==
- List of psychedelic documentaries
