= Second Sight =

Second sight, or extrasensory perception, is an alleged vision of remote or future events.

Second Sight may refer to:

== Film and television ==
- Second Sight: A Love Story, a 1984 television film starring Elizabeth Montgomery
- Second Sight (1989 film), an American comedy film
- Second Sight (2008 film), a Canadian documentary film
- Second Sight (TV series), a 2000–2001 British crime drama
- "Second Sight" (The Avengers), a 1963 TV episode
- "Second Sight" (Midsomer Murders), a 2005 TV episode
- "Second Sight" (Star Trek: Deep Space Nine), a 1993 TV episode

== Music ==
- Second Sight, a mid-1990s band, with an eponymous album, featuring Vince Welnick

=== Albums ===
- Second Sight (Hey Rosetta! album), 2014
- Second Sight (Marc Johnson album), 1987
- Second Sight, by Jami Sieber, 1998
- Second Sight, by Lonnie Mack, 1986
- Second Sight, by the Shore, 2014

=== Songs ===
- "Second Sight", by the Dolphin Brothers on Catch the Fall, 1987
- "Second Sight", by Kula Shaker from Strangefolk, 2007
- "Second Sight", by Placebo from Sleeping with Ghosts, 2003

== Other uses ==
- Second Sight (BBS software), a bulletin board system program
- Second Sight (Sapphire and Steel), a 2008 audio play
- Second Sight (video game), a 2004 action-adventure game
- Second Sight Medical Products, maker of the Argus retinal prosthesis
- Second Sight, a non-profit organisation founded by Lucy Mathen
- Second sight, a temporary improvement of near vision usually caused by a nuclear sclerosis cataract
- Second Sight, a 2005 novel by Gary Blackwood
- 2nd Sight, a 1997 book by David Carson
- Second Sight, investigators of the British Post Office scandal

== See also ==
- Second Sighting, a 1988 album by Ace Frehley / Frehley's Comet
