= Monica Gagliano =

Italian ecologist (born 1976)

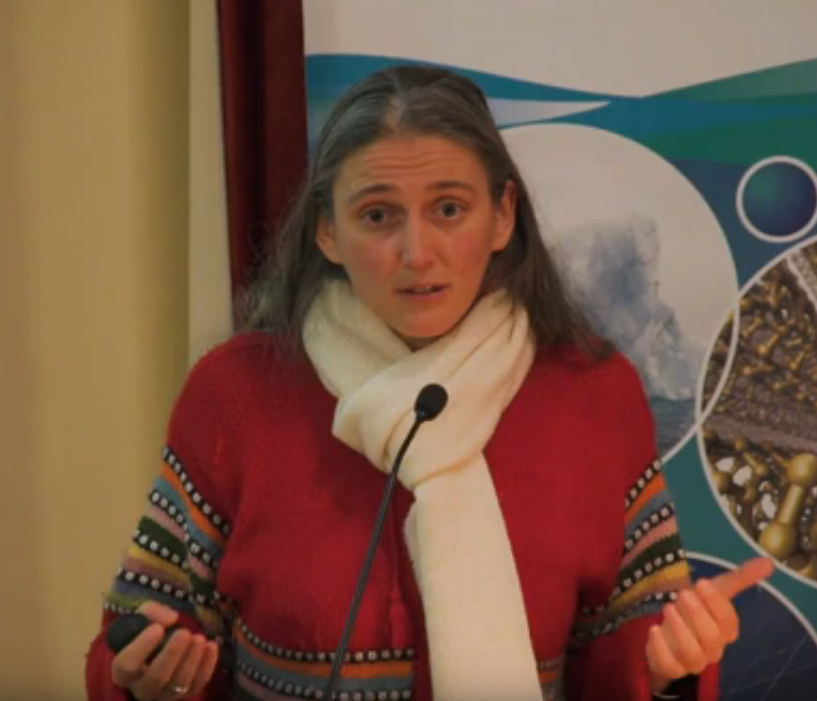

Education
- Education: James Cook University

Philosophical work
- Region: Plant cognition
- School: Evolutionary ecology Phenomenology
- Website: www.monicagagliano.com

Monica Gagliano (born 1976) is an ecologist known for her research on plant intelligence.

Gagliano is a Research Associate Professor in the field of evolutionary ecology at Southern Cross University in Lismore, Australia, where she directs the Biological Intelligence lab. She is a former fellow of the Australian Research Council. Through her research with plants, she "has extended the concept of cognition (including perception, learning processes, memory) in plants." She has worked to expand how the public view plants, and all of nature, in respect of their subjectivity and sentience. Gagliano grew up in northern Italy.

== Career ==
Gagliano trained as a marine ecologist. As a postdoctoral fellow at James Cook University in 2008, she was researching Ambon damselfish (Pomacentrus amboinensis) at the Great Barrier Reef in Australia. As part of her research, she was required to kill and dissect the fish at the end of the study. The fish were used to her presence and would swim in and out of her hand daily, but on the last morning, when she visited them to say goodbye, they refused to come out of their crevices and greet her, as if they knew what she intended. This produced an ethical and professional crisis for Gagliano. She completed the study but vowed not to kill in the name of science again. She left animal science and entered plant science. Her sense that the fish understood what she was doing set her on a course of studying sentience in other life forms.

Gagliano is a researcher in the field of plant cognition. Her most well-known study, from 2014, investigated learning and memory in Mimosa pudica. Mimosa plants typically fold their leaves at the slightest disturbance. Gagliano's study showed that Mimosa plants no longer folded their leaves after being dropped in the same way repeatedly. They habituated to the disturbance, and habituation is an elementary form of learning. In 2016 Gagliano showed that the common garden pea (Pisum sativum) demonstrated learning by association. That is, in the same way that Pavlov's Dog learned to associate the sound of a bell ringing with food, the pea plant learned to associate an unrelated stimulus, in this case moving air from a fan, with plant "food," namely, light. As a way of further investigating plant cognition, in 2022 she and a research team posited that plants are able to pay attention and suggested using a phenomenological-empirical approach to test this hypothesis.

Gagliano has extended the field of bioacoustics to plants. In 2012 she showed corn plants emitting sounds. In 2017 she showed that the roots of the pea plant (Pisum sativum) sensed a water source through sound cues.

Gagliano advocates for comparing learning in plants to learning in animals, challenging the conventional scientific boundary between beings with brains and beings without them. In a 2013 presentation Gagliano argued that the same habituation that the Mimosa plants showed, when it is observed in animals, is called "learning," and therefore researchers need to "use the same language to describe the same behavior." She told New Scientist in 2018, "Whether it is an animal, a plant or bacteria, if it ticks the boxes that we agree define learning, then that is what it is doing." In a 2015 journal article she addressed common theoretical problems that lead researchers not to research intelligence in plants and suggested solutions to these barriers of thought.

Gagliano is an advocate for stronger ethical standards in scientific protocols for working with both plants and animals. In 2020 she and several animal behavior scientists, concerned that current practices of conventional science do not go far enough in guaranteeing the welfare of animals, plants, or ecosystems, suggested criteria to deepen researchers' ethical commitment to nonhuman welfare. Their suggestions include using language that respects sentience in animals; emphasizing aspects of experience that are important to the animal being studied (such as the importance of smell to dogs); and incorporating unconventional sources of knowledge, such as Indigenous knowing and personal relationships with the beings under study.

In addition to her Western scientific training and research, Gagliano has also trained with Peruvian plant shamans, following established shamanic protocols to learn how to communicate directly with plants. She credits plants with suggesting designs for lab experiments and collaborating with her to solve research problems.

== In popular culture ==
Michael Pollan's 2013 article in the New Yorker, "The Intelligent Plant," introduced Gagliano's work to a wide audience and reignited popular interest in, and discussion about, plant cognition.

Artist and writer James Bridle discussed Gagliano's work in their book Ways of Being (2022). In their 2023 interview with Emergence magazine they called her work "hugely influential" to them.

Novelist Richard Powers, author of The Overstory, and Monica Gagliano participated in a conversation on "Plant Intelligence" at the Institute for Cross-Disciplinary Engagement at Dartmouth College in 2020.

Indigenous botanist and professor Robin Wall Kimmerer and Monica Gagliano were interviewed on the Bioneers podcast.

Gagliano was one of six people studying various aspects of consciousness who were profiled in the 2021 documentary Aware.

== Books ==
- Thus Spoke the Plant: A Remarkable Journey of Groundbreaking Scientific Discoveries and Personal Encounters with Plants (North Atlantic Books, 2018) ISBN 9781623172435

=== Edited books ===
- P Vieira, M Gagliano, and J Ryan, eds. The Green Thread: Dialogues with the Vegetal World (Rowman & Littlefield, 2015) ISBN 9781498510592
- M Gagliano, J Ryan, and P Viera, eds. The Language of Plants: Science, Philosophy, Literature (University of Minnesota Press, 2017) ISBN 1517901855
- J Ryan, P Vieira, and M Gagliano, eds. The Mind of Plants: Narratives of Vegetal Intelligence (Synergetic Press, 2021) ISBN 0907791875
