= Dürbeck & Dohmen =

Düberck & Dohmen, known as René Dohmen and Joachim Duerbeck, is the music duo who are a part of Score Productions, which composes music for film & television, series, documentaries, theatre, commercials and artists. Their work covers a lot of ground - from classical songwriting to electronic music - as well as orchestral and abstract experimental.

== Early life ==
The musical life of Joachim (born 9 December 1967) and René (born 16 June 1966) began as teenagers, when they used to play in bands; René played guitar in punk bands and Jumpel drums in pop and jazz bands. Then, after school they formed a band. Over the course of eight years they released three albums and seven singles with EMI Germany. Duerbeck and René played over 400 gigs in Germany, the Netherlands and the UK. Then, after splitting up the band, they founded their own company and studio and started writing and producing music for films. Since then they have been writing scores for numerous films and documentaries.

== Career ==
Inside their Cologne-based studios, Joachim and René have been producing music for many motion pictures and TV shows since 2000. At the Filmfest Valencia, they were awarded the film music award for Magic Eye and in 2008 they received the film music award at the prestigious Max Ophuls Festival for Come In and Burn Out. The movies Chandani: The Daughter of the Elephant Whisperer and Belltracchi: The Art of Forgery, for which Düberck & Dohmen scored the music, won the German Film Award LOLA in the category "Best Children's movie". As musicians and producers, they are also active in various bands and projects. Düberck & Dohmen are members of the German Film Academy and the European Film Academy.

== Cinematique Instruments ==
Cinematique Instruments is a brand of rare and unique instrument sound libraries produced by Dürbeck & Dohmen.

== Filmography ==
- 2002: Freitagnacht, Theatrical film
- 2003: Was ich dir sagen wollte, Short film by Freyas
- 2003: MIa, Short film by Philipp Schäfer
- 2004: Notruf, Documentary Series
- 2004: Feuer, Theatrical film by Hardi Sturm
- 2004: Klippenberger - Der Film, Documentary by Jörg Kobel
- 2004: Todesstrafe für eine Lüge, Documentary by Peter F. Müller
- 2004: Magic Eye, Theatrical film by Kujtim Çashku
- 2005: Nachtasyl, TV film by Hardi Sturm
- 2006: Abenteuer Glück, Documentary Series by Annette Dittert
- 2006: 37 ohne Zwiebeln, Short film by André Erkau
- 2006: Sie hat sich benommen wie eine Deutsche, Documentary by Gert Monheim
- 2006: Der Gotteskrieger und seine Frau, Documentary by Gert Monheim
- 2007: Liebespfand, Short film by Matthias Klimsa
- 2007: Absolution, Short film by Markus Sehr
- 2008: Up, Up to the Sky, Theatrical film by Hardi Sturm
- 2008: Come In and Burn Out, Theatrical film by André Erkau
- 2008: Tatort - Auf der Sonnenseite, TV series by Richard Huber
- 2009: Mamma kommt!, TV film by Isabel Kleefeld
- 2009: Der verlorene Sohn, TV film by Nina Grosse
- 2010: U.F.O, TV film by Burkhard Feige
- 2010: Tatort - Vergissmeinnicht, TV series by Richard Huber
- 2010: Anduni, Theatrical film by Samira Radsi
- 2010: Kreutzer kommt, TV film by Richard Huber
- 2010: Chandani: The Daughter of the Elephant Whisperer, documentary by Arne Birkenstock
- 2011: No More Mr. Ice Guy, Theatrical film by André Erkau
- 2011: Holger sacht nix, TV film by Thomas Durchschlag
- 2012: Die Lottokönige, TV series by Dominic Müller
- 2012: Wie Tag und Nacht, TV film by Sibylle Tafel
- 2012: Kreutzer kommt ins Krankenhaus, TV film by Richard Huber
- 2012: Stubbe – Von Fall zu Fall, TV series by Frauke Thielecke
- 2012: Unterwegs mit Elisa, TV film by Bettina Woernle
- 2013: Free Fall, Theatrical film by Stephan Lacant
- 2014: Der letzte Mentsch, Theatrical film by Pierre-Henri Salfati
- 2014: Tatort - Der Irre Iwan, TV series by Richard Huber
- 2014: 10 000 000 000, Theatrical Documentary by Valentin Thurn
- 2015: The secret life of me, Theatrical film by Laurie Shearing and Ricardo De Los Rios
- 2015: Tatort - Schwanensee, TV series by André Erkau
- 2015: Die Füchsin, TV film by Samira Radsi
