= Foodsharing.de =

foodsharing.de
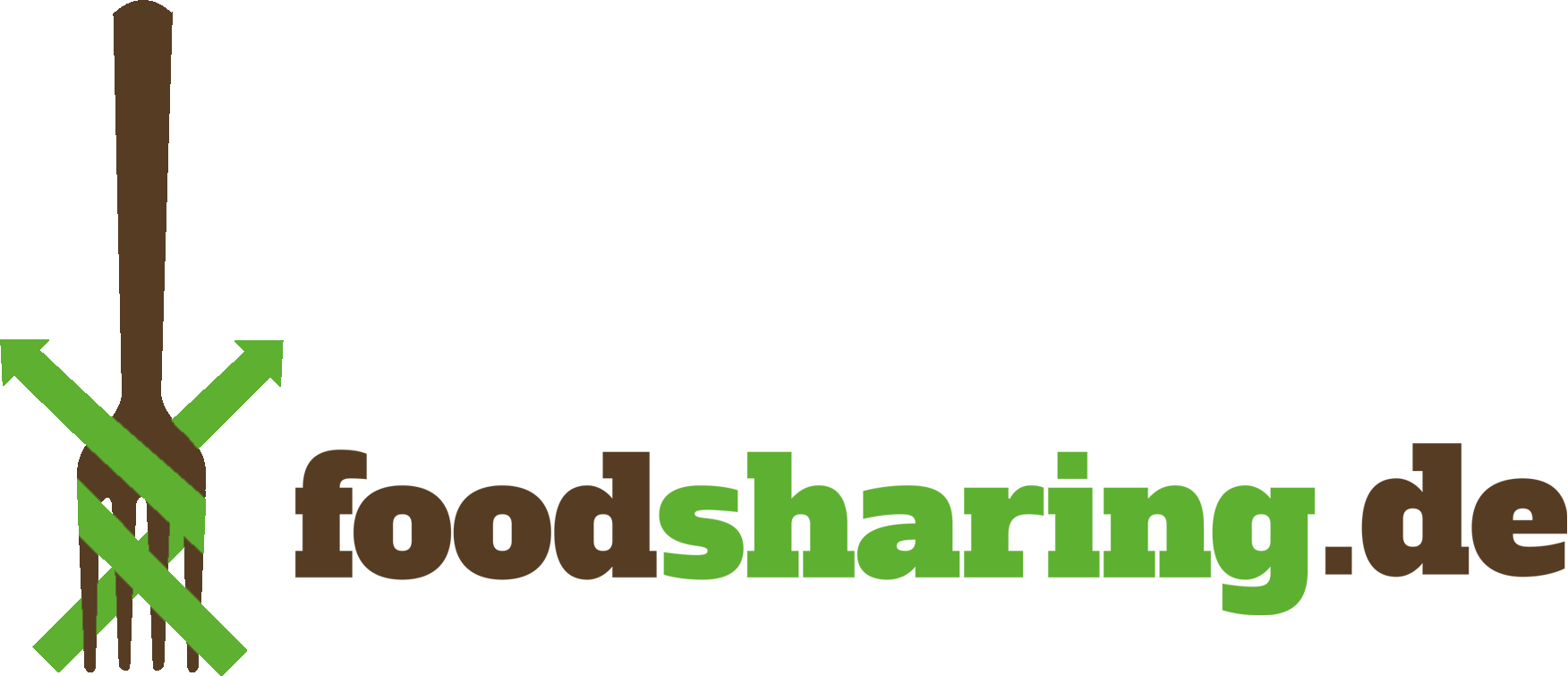
- Available in: German
- Owner: Foodsharing e.V.
- Website: www.foodsharing.de
- Commercial: No
- Registration: Optional, but required for participants
- Users: 316.621 foodsharer (March 2020); 71.797 voluntary foodsavers (March 2020)
- Launched: 12 December 2012; 13 years ago
- Current status: online
- Content license: MIT
- Written in: PHP, HTML, Python, CSS, Ruby, JavaScript, ApacheConf, Shell, Vue

foodsharing.de is an online platform that saves and distributes surplus food in Germany and Austria. It is managed by the Foodsharing association (foodsharing e.V.) and was founded on December 12, 2012. On foodsharing.de individuals, retailers and producers can offer or collect food that would otherwise be thrown away. This service is completely free, and functions thanks to volunteer work. The project's goal is to fight everyday food waste and to raise awareness about this problem in society.

== History ==
The original idea to create a platform against food waste arose between Valentin Thurn, director of the film Taste the Waste, and Sebastian Engbrocks, supervisor of the film's social media campaign, in the summer of 2011. In early 2012 the design students Thomas Gerling and Christian Zehnter, and television journalist Ines Rainer, independently came up with a similar idea. The joint project is the result of the collaboration of all these individuals. From April to July 2012, they raised the necessary starting capital through crowdfunding via Startnext.de. The goal was to collect 10.000 EUR and in the end 11.594 EUR was received from 394 supporters.

On November 16 the platform entered beta phase and launched on December 12, 2012. A relaunch on May 12, 2013 equipped it with a revised design and new search options. In May 2013 it was also launched in Austria, initially under the name myfoodsharing.at, and is now merged with the German platform. As of February 2014 the German foodsharing.de has attracted close to 35.000 active users. It won the Greentec Award in the communication category on July 10, 2013.

In December 2014, foodsharing.de and lebensmittelretten.de, a website founded by Raphael Fellmer and Raphael Wintrich, merged their operations. The functionality for sharing food with other individuals was taken from foodsharing.de, while the collaboration with shops and supermarkets was taken from lebensmittelretten.de.

In 2018 and 2019, the team behind www.foodsharing.de published the source code and worked on the development of a mobile app.

== Concept ==
foodsharing.de enables individuals to share food, whilst also allowing volunteers to pick up food from businesses to distribute it through public storage places, so called fairteiler. Since most supermarkets are organized as chains and therefore each branch has to follow standardized rules and regulations, the management is contacted directly. This results in regional and sometimes even national collaborations, e.g. with Bio Company. There are also many local co-operations with single supermarkets or bakeries, which are often started independently by members of the community. Additionally, foodsavers also collect surplus food from businesses at large events such as Christmas markets.

== Foodsharer vs. Foodsaver ==
Everyone is invited to sign up as a foodsharer on the official website. As soon as an account is created, individuals can see other peoples' so called "Essenskorb" (engl. Foodbasket) and pick up surplus food from private individuals. They can of course also offer their own surplus food. In order to become a Foodsaver, one has to pass a test regarding hygiene and behavioural rules and can then apply to become a member of a group that regularly pick up food from cooperating businesses.

== Differentiation from other methods of foodsaving ==
Other organizations like the German Tafel differ from foodsharing in that in the latter, the surplus food is given to people before date expires. Whereas with foodsharing.de expired food is also distributed if it is still edible and does not pose a health risk. Volunteers (so-called 'foodsavers') need to sign a legal agreement that renders the businesses not liable and obliges the foodsavers to pass on the food for free, along with information as to its food-saved nature. While the main focus of Tafel is to assert if someone is in need, foodsharing.de is interested only in saving food, without focusing on the financial circumstances of the recipient.

In contrast to dumpster diving, which is about taking non-spoiled food from waste containers, foodsaving.de wants to prevent food from being thrown away in the first place.

== See also ==
- List of food banks
