= Perfectly a Strangeness =

2024 documentary short film by Alison McAlpine

- Film poster
- Directed by: Alison McAlpine
- Written by: Alison McAlpine
- Cinematography: Nicolas Canniccioni
- Edited by: Carolina Siraqyan
- Music by: Ben Grossman
- Production company: Second Sight Pictures
- Release date: May 2024 (Cannes)
- Running time: 15 minutes
- Countries: Canada; Chile

Perfectly a Strangeness (stylised in lowercase) is a 2024 documentary short film written and directed by Alison McAlpine. The world premiere was at the Official Short Film Competition of the 2024 Cannes Film Festival, where it was nominated for the Short Film Palme d'Or. At the 98th Academy Awards, it was also nominated for Best Documentary Short Film.

It was largely filmed at La Silla Observatory, a European Southern Observatory (ESO) site in Chile, with some shots filmed further north at ESO's Paranal Observatory.

== Summary ==
The Cannes Film Festival summary says: "In the dazzling incandescence of an unknown desert, three donkeys discover an abandoned astronomical observatory and the universe. A sensorial, cinematic exploration of what a story can be."

== Production ==
The film was shot with a small crew in the Chilean dessert using an Arri Alexa Mini and 24mm & 55mm Hawk V-Lite anamorphic lenses. Anamorphic lenses were used to visually represent the perspective of a donkey. The time lapses sequences were shot by McAlpine herself using a Sony a7S III.

== Release ==
The film premiered at the 2024 Cannes Film Festival, and had its North American Premiere at the 2024 Toronto International Film Festival. It has since travelled to over 100 international film festivals, playing in 34 countries and winning 24 awards. “One of the most cinematic documentaries of the year”, according to Deadline Hollywood writer Matthew Carey, Perfectly a Strangeness was nominated by Cinema Eye Honors for Best Nonfiction Short Film of 2026, and nominated by the 2026 Academy Awards for Best Short Documentary Film.

== Awards and nominations ==
Year	Organization	Category	Result	Ref.
2024	Chicago International Film Festival	Silver Hugo Documentary Short Film 2024	Won	
2024	Festival du nouveau cinéma	National Competition Grand Prize	Won	
2024	Science New Wave Festival	Theme-Sensitive Award	Won	
2024	Thess International Short Film Festival	Cinematic Achievement Award	Won	
2024	FIEV	Best Quebec Short Film-Jury Prize	Won	
2025	Canadian Screen Awards	Best Short Documentary Film	Nominated	
2025	Full Frame Jury	Award for Best Short Oscar Qualifying	Won	
2025	Cinema Eye Honors	Nonfiction Short Film	Nominated	
2025	IDA Documentary Awards	Best Short Documentary Special Mention	Won	
2025	Full Frame Documentary Film Festival	The John Franklin Humanities Institute Award	Won	
2025	Toronto International Film Festival	Canada's Top Ten	Won	
2025	Trento Film Festival	Silver Gentian, Best Artistic Technical Contribution	Won	
2025	i-Fest International Film Festival	Best Direction Short	Won	
2025	Rendez-vous Québec Cinéma	Best Short Film	Won	
2025	Nevada City Film Festival	Best Cinematography	Won	
2025	Tramway Film Festival	Best Film, Cine Sinn Fine	Won	
2025	Athens International Film + Video Festival	From the Booth Award	Won	
2025	Festival Internacional de Cine de Medio Ambiente de Canarias	Best Short Documentary Film	Won	
2025	Planet in Focus	Best Canadian Short Award	Won	
2025	Miami Short Film Festival	Best Experimental Film	Won	
2026	Academy Awards	Best Documentary Short Film	Nominated	
2026	Festival Plein(s) Écran(s)	Prix Yes Sir! Madame…	Won	
2026	Green Film Network Awards	Best Short Green Film	Won	

== See also ==
- Academy Award for Best Documentary Short Film
- Submissions for Best Documentary Short Academy Award
