= Life Is Not for Cowards =

2012 film

- Film poster
- German: Das Leben ist nichts für Feiglinge
- Directed by: André Erkau
- Starring: Wotan Wilke Möhring; Helen Woigk
- Release date: 24 September 2012
- Running time: 98 minutes
- Country: Germany
- Language: German

Life Is Not for Cowards (German: Das Leben ist nichts für Feiglinge) is a 2012 German drama film directed by André Erkau.

== Cast ==
- Wotan Wilke Möhring as Markus
- Helen Woigk as Kim
- Christine Schorn as Gerlinde
- Frederick Lau as Alex
- Rosalie Thomass as Paula
- Edin Hasanović as Franz
- Philipp Baltus as Sven
- Carolina Vera as Babette Färber
- Hannes Hellmann as Alex Vater
- Nina Petri as Alex Mutter
- Oliver Bröcker as Punk
- Christian Kerepeszki as Obdachloser
- Franz Dinda as Arzt
- Adam Bousdoukos as Kurt
