= Fairy Creek (film) =

- Directed by: Jen Muranetz
- Written by: Jen Muranetz
- Produced by: Jen Muranetz; Sepehr Samimi
- Cinematography: Sepehr Samimi
- Edited by: Liam Sherriff; Rafi Spivak
- Music by: Amine Bouzaher
- Production company: Understory Films
- Release date: October 17, 2024 (PIF)
- Running time: 88 minutes
- Country: Canada
- Language: English

Fairy Creek is a Canadian documentary film, directed by Jen Muranetz and released in 2024. The film profiles the Fairy Creek old-growth logging protests of 2020 and 2021, against old-growth logging on Vancouver Island.

The film premiered at Planet in Focus in 2024, and was screened at the Whistler Film Festival in December 2024, before going into commercial release in 2025.

== Accolades ==
Award	Date of ceremony	Category	Recipient	Result	Ref.
Canadian Screen Awards	2026	Best Sound Design in a Documentary	Eli Haligua, Blair Moog, Fatih Ragbet, Gulay Acar	Nominated	
