= Bombhunters =

- Directed by: Skye Fitzgerald
- Produced by: Skye Fitzgerald
- Cinematography: Skye Fitzgerald
- Edited by: Chris G. Parkhurst
- Music by: William Campbell
- Production company: Spin Film
- Distributed by: Indigo Film & Television
- Release date: August 21, 2006
- Country: United States
- Language: English

Bombhunters is a 2006 documentary film produced and directed by Skye Fitzgerald, that documents the effects of unexploded ordnance on Cambodian people, both within their homeland and in the US.

== Production ==
Including a Fulbright Scholarship, the project was funded by the Sundance Institute and the United States Institute of Peace, including grants from The Office of Weapons Removal and Abatement in the U.S. Department of States Bureau of Political-Military Affairs.

Based upon his 2001 trip to Cambodia, Skye Fitzgerald, a graduate of Eastern Oregon University, spent 6 months in Cambodia and Vietnam creating the documentary Bombhunters.

Music was used from the popular Canadian post-rock band Godspeed You! Black Emperor. The band allowed songs from Yanqui U.X.O. to be used, stating that while they didn't normally allow their music to be used in films, they could align with the social nature of the film.

== Purpose ==
The film project documents the effects of UXO* on Cambodian people, both within their homeland and in the US. In particular, Bombhunters documents villagers efforts throughout rural Cambodia as they seek out UXO and attempt to render it safe for sale to the scrap metal industry in order to survive.

== Release ==
When the film had its premiere in November 2005 in Portland, Oregon. This film has been showcased in many film festivals across the globe including; Hot Springs Documentary Film Festival, Rhode Island International Film Festival, Palm Beach International Film Festival, Planet in Focus Environmental Film Festival, Seattle Human Rights Film Festival, and Northwest Film & Video Festival.

In addition to broadcast on US public television the film has aired on the History Channel Asia, Free Speech television in the US and on select national channels in Europe, including national broadcast on TV2 in Sweden.

== Response ==
Since completion, the film has been credited by the US Department of State with influencing national legislation in Cambodia that has led to a 50% drop in UXO tampering casualties.
