= Theater of Life (2016 film) =

Theater of Life is a 2016 Canadian feature-length documentary film written and directed by Peter Svatek about a gourmet soup kitchen created by Italian chef Massimo Bottura and 60 international colleagues such as Mario Batali, Rene Redzepi and Alain Ducasse, using food waste from Expo 2015 in Milan. Situated in an abandoned theatre, the soup kitchen was named the "Refettorio Ambrosiano" by Bottura. The film also addresses the issue of food waste and the 1.3 billion tons of food thrown away annually around the world—one-third of all food produced.

Svatek co-produced the film with his wife, Josette Gauthier, and the National Film Board of Canada. The film received the Tokyo Gohan Award in the San Sebastián International Film Festival’s Culinary Zinema section, and was named Best Canadian Feature Film at Planet in Focus, a Toronto environmental film festival.
