= Cielo (film) =

2017 Canadian documentary film

- Film poster
- Directed by: Alison McAlpine
- Written by: Alison McAlpine
- Produced by: Alison McAlpine; Carmen Garcia; Paola Castillo
- Cinematography: Benjamin Echazarreta
- Edited by: Andrea Chignoli
- Music by: Philippe Lauzier
- Production companies: Second Sight Pictures; Argus Films; Errante Producciones
- Distributed by: Seafar North
- Release date: October 6, 2017 (NYFF)
- Running time: 78 minutes
- Country: Canada
- Languages: Spanish; English; French

Cielo is a Canadian-Chilean documentary film, directed by Alison McAlpine and released in 2017. Filmed in the Atacama Desert in Chile, the film is about the myths, stories, existential queries and the beauty of the night sky in the region.

The film premiered at the New York Film Festival in October 2017, and was released in its final version in 2018. It has been presented in over 400 international film festivals and cinemas, as well as winning several awards.^{,}^{,} Named as "One of the 10 best documentaries of 2018" by Esquire and one of the "best films of 2018… that you didn't see" by The Guardian, Cielo has also been critically acclaimed by publications such as Variety, The Village Voice, The Globe and Mail, Le Devoir and Indie Outlook.

== Awards and nominations ==
Year	Organization	Category	Nominated person	Result	Ref.
2018	Hot Docs	Best Documentary (Canadian Spectrum)	Alison McAlpine	Nominated	
2018	Karlovy Vary International Film Festival	Best Documentary	Alison McAlpine	Nominated	
2018	Byron Bay International Film Festival	Best Cinematography	Benjamín Echazarreta	Won	
2018	Byron Bay International Film Festival	Best Documentary	Alison McAlpine	Nominated	
2018	Byron Bay International Film Festival	Best Film	Alison McAlpine	Nominated	
2018	Salem Film Fest	Award for Cinematography	Benjamín Echazarreta	Won	
2018	Banff Mountain Film Competition	Award for Creative Excellence	Paola Castillo, Alison McAlpine, Carmen Garcia, Sean Farnel	Won	
2018	Santiago International Film Festival	Kinêma Award	Alison McAlpine	Won	
2019	Trento Film Festival	Audience Award	Alison McAlpine	Won	
2019	Bilbao Mendi Film Festival	Best Cinematography	Alison McAlpine	Won	
2019	Rendez-vous Québec Cinéma	Most Successful Film Outside Quebec	Alison McAlpine, Carmen Garcia.	Nominated	
2019	Rendez-vous Québec Cinéma	Best Cinematography in a Documentary	Benjamín Echazarreta	Nominated	
2019	Rendez-vous Québec Cinéma	Best Documentary Film	Alison McAlpine, Carmen Garcia.	Nominated	
2019	Rendez-vous Québec Cinéma	Best Sound in a Documentary	Alison McAlpine, Rodrigo Salvatierra, Carlo Sanchez, Miguel Hormazábal, Claudio Vargas, Mauricio López, Andrés Carrasco	Nominated	
2019	Ulju Mountain Film Festival	Grand Prize	Alison McAlpine	Nominated	
