= 37 ohne Zwiebeln =

2006 German short film

- Directed by: André Erkau
- Written by: André Erkau
- Produced by: Mohammad Farokhmanesh
- Starring: Bernd Moss; Linda Olsansky
- Cinematography: Dirk Morgenstern
- Edited by: Christoph Brandt
- Music by: Dürbeck & Dohmen
- Release date: 24 January 2006 (Max Ophüls Festival)
- Running time: 14 minutes
- Country: Germany
- Language: German

37 ohne Zwiebeln (lit. '37 without onions') is a German short film directed by André Erkau. The film premiered at the 2006 Max Ophüls Preis film festival and is also the director's final thesis at the Cologne Academy of Media Arts.

== Plot ==
Lukas Knispe wanted to become a diver due to the stillness underwater. At age 37, he works as the sales manager of a business, where his work is fast-paced. He experiences time gaps, such as moving from the canteen to the conference room or returning to his office without recalling the discussions. His attempts to address these issues cause further difficulty, which he resolves after gaining emotional stability.

== Cast ==
- Bernd Moss as Lukas Knispe
- Linda Olsansky as Maria
- Bjarne Mädel as Ben

== Awards ==
- 2006: Best Short Film, Filmfestival Max Ophüls Preis
- 2006: Special Mention, Internationales Kurzfilm-Festival Hamburg
- 2006: Best Script, Studio Hamburg Nachwuchspreis
