= Alison McAlpine =

Canadian film director and screenwriter

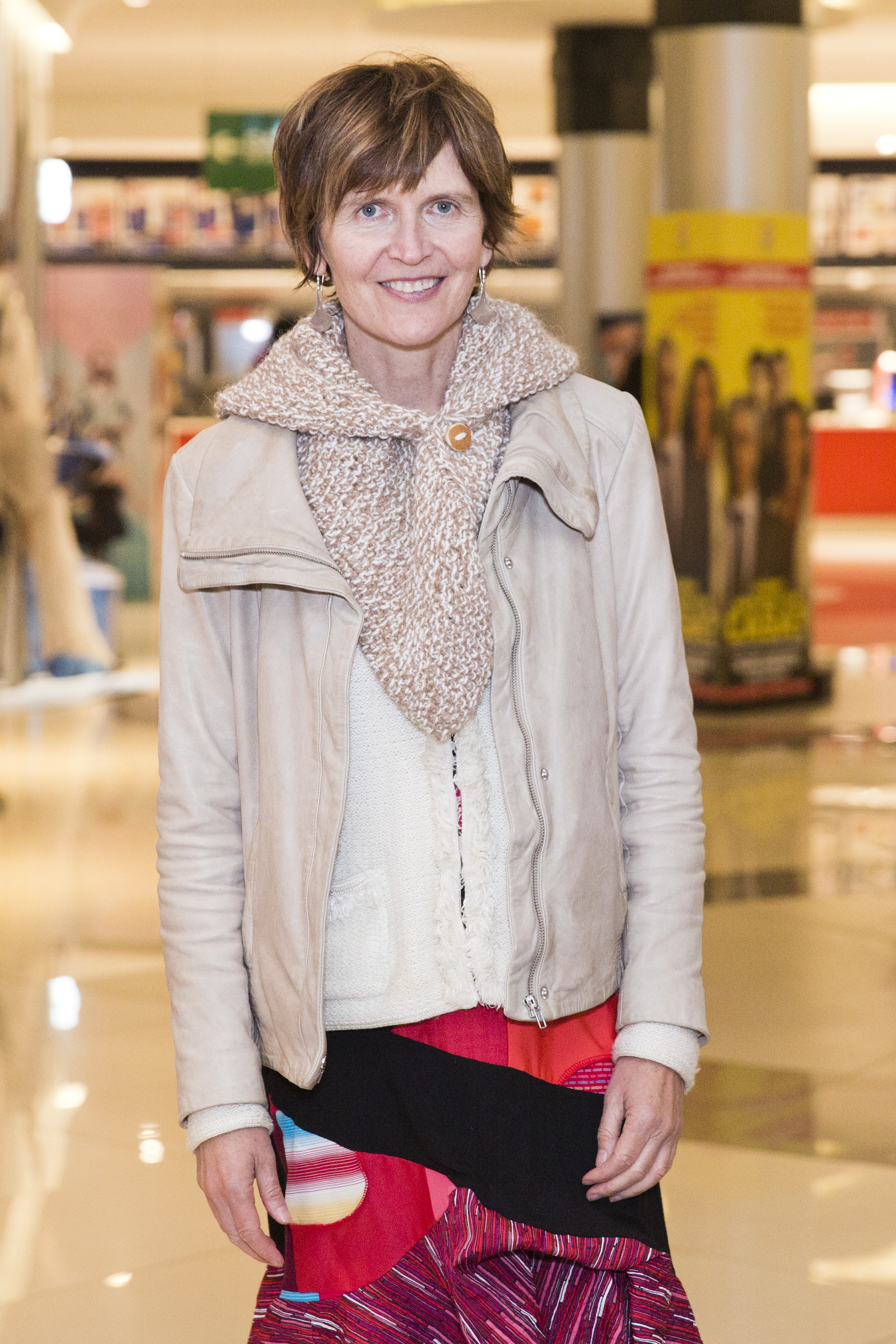
- McAlpine at SANFIC 2018
- Occupations: Film director Screenwriter
- Years active: 2000s-present
- Notable work: Cielo (film) perfectly a strangeness

Alison McAlpine is a Canadian filmmaker and writer living in Montreal, Quebec, best known for her films CIELO and perfectly a strangeness.

== Career ==
Born in Vancouver, British Columbia, she began her career as a poet, playwright and theatre director.

She moved into filmmaking with her first film Second Sight, a cinematic non-fiction ghost story. Second Sight was presented at more than 35 international film festivals, winning the Special Jury Mention at Slamdance 2009. The BBC also commissioned her to make two versions of Second Sight: An Da Shealladh for BBC Alba (2005) and Ghostman of Skye (2009) for the series Wonderland on BBC2.

CIELO, McAlpine's first feature documentary, premiered at the New York Film Festival in 2017. The film is about the myths, stories, existential queries and beauty of the night sky as experienced in the Atacama Desert and was released in its final version in 2018. The film has been presented in over 400 international film festivals and cinemas, as well as winning several awards.^{,} Named as “One of the 10 best documentaries of 2018” by Esquire and “The best films of 2018…that you didn’t see” by The Guardian, CIELO has also been critically acclaimed by Variety, The Village Voice, The Globe and Mail, Le Devoir and Indie Outlook.^{,}^{,}^{,}^{,}^{,}

perfectly a strangeness, McAlpine's first short film, had its World Premiere at the Cannes Film Festival, Official Competition 2024,^{,} its North American Premiere at the 2024 Toronto International Film Festival^{,} and has since travelled to over 100 international film festivals and cinemas, playing in 34 countries and winning 24 awards. Notably, it was named to TIFF's annual Canada's Top Ten list for 2024 and received the Oscar qualifying Full Frame Jury Award for Best Short 2025, the Silver Hugo Award at the Chicago International Film Festival of 2024 and the Grand Prize of 2024 at the Festival du Nouveau Cinéma.^{,} “One of the most cinematic documentaries of the year”, according to Deadline Hollywood writer Matthew Carey, perfectly a strangeness has been nominated by the 2026 Academy Awards for Best Short Documentary Film, and also by the 2026 Cinema Eye Honors for Best Nonfiction Short Film of 2026.

A 2021 Guggenheim Fellow, McAlpine has taught filmmaking at several universities. She was the Mordecai Richler Writer/Filmmaker in Residence at McGill University and has offered masterclasses at the Scottish Documentary Institute in Edinburgh, among other institutions. She is currently working on several new films and writings.

== Filmography ==
- 2005: An Da Shealladh
- 2008: Second Sight
- 2009: Ghostman of Skye
- 2018: CIELO
- 2024: perfectly a strangeness

== Awards and nominations ==
Year	Organization	Category	Nominated work	Result	Ref.
2018	Karlovy Vary International Film Festival	Best Documentary	Cielo	Nominated	
2018	Byron Bay International Film Festival	Best Cinematography	Cielo	Won	
2018	Byron Bay International Film Festival	Best Documentary	Cielo	Nominated	
2018	Byron Bay International Film Festival	Best Film	Cielo	Nominated	
2018	Salem Film Fest	Award for Cinematography	Cielo	Won	
2018	Banff Mountain Film Competition	Award for Creative Excellence	Cielo	Won	
2018	Santiago International Film Festival	Kinêma Award	Cielo	Won	
2019	Trento Film Festival	Audience Award	Cielo	Won	
2019	Bilbao Mendi Film Festival	Best Cinematography	Cielo	Won	
2019	Rendez-vous Québec Cinéma	Most Successful Film Outside Quebec	Cielo	Nominated	
2019	Rendez-vous Québec Cinéma	Best Cinematography in a Documentary	Cielo	Nominated	
2019	Rendez-vous Québec Cinéma	Best Documentary	Cielo	Nominated	
2019	Rendez-vous Québec Cinéma	Best Sound in a Documentary	Cielo	Nominated	
2019	Ulju Mountain Film Festival	Grand Prize	Cielo	Nominated	
2024	Chicago International Film Festival	Silver Hugo Documentary Short Film 2024	perfectly a strangeness	Won	
2024	Festival du nouveau cinéma	National Competition Grand Prize	perfectly a strangeness	Won	
2024	Science New Wave Festival	Theme-Sensitive Award	perfectly a strangeness	Won	
2024	Thess International Short Film Festival	Cinematic Achievement Award	perfectly a strangeness	Won	
2024	FIEV	Best Quebec Short Film-Jury Prize	perfectly a strangeness	Won	
2025	Canadian Screen Awards	Best Short Documentary Film	perfectly a strangeness	Nominated	
2025	Full Frame Jury	Award for Best Short Oscar Qualifying	perfectly a strangeness	Won	
2025	Cinema Eye Honors	Nonfiction Short Film	perfectly a strangeness	Nominated	
2025	IDA Documentary Awards	Best Short Documentary Special Mention	perfectly a strangeness	Won	
2025	Full Frame Documentary Film Festival	The John Franklin Humanities Institute Award	perfectly a strangeness	Won	
2025	Toronto International Film Festival	Canada's Top Ten	perfectly a strangeness	Won	
2025	Trento Film Festival	Silver Gentian, Best Artistic Technical Contribution	perfectly a strangeness	Won	
2025	i-Fest International Film Festival	Best Direction Short	perfectly a strangeness	Won	
2025	Rendez-vous Québec Cinéma	Best Short Film	perfectly a strangeness	Won	
2025	Nevada City Film Festival	Best Cinematography	perfectly a strangeness	Won	
2025	Tramway Film Festival	Best Film, Cine Sinn Fine	perfectly a strangeness	Won	
2025	Athens International Film + Video Festival	From the Booth Award	perfectly a strangeness	Won	
2025	Festival Internacional de Cine de Medio Ambiente de Canarias	Best Short Documentary Film	perfectly a strangeness	Won	
2025	Planet in Focus	Best Canadian Short Award	perfectly a strangeness	Won	
2025	Miami Short Film Festival	Best Experimental Film	perfectly a strangeness	Won	
2026	Academy Awards	Best Documentary Short Film	perfectly a strangeness	Nominated	
2026	Festival Plein(s) Écran(s)	Prix Yes Sir! Madame…	perfectly a strangeness	Won	
2026	Green Film Network Awards	Best Short Green Film	perfectly a strangeness	Won	
