= Red Ryder (software) =

Terminal emulator

- Original authors: Wat Buchanon, Scott Watson
- Developer: The FreeSoft Company
- Release: 1984; 42 years ago
- Final release: 10.3
- Written in: BASIC, C
- Operating system: Classic Mac OS
- Type: Terminal emulation, BBS
- License: Proprietary software; shareware distribution (up to 9.4), commercial distribution (since version 10.0)

Red Ryder is a communications and terminal emulation software program released for the Apple Macintosh in 1984. Initially distributed as a shareware, the application offered rich features and configuration settings. Red Ryder was discontinued in 1989 and replaced by White Knight.

== History ==
First released in 1984 for Macintosh computers, early versions of Red Ryder were written by Wat Buchanon as a Microsoft BASIC program with documentation included on the disk filled with humor aimed at Apple and programmers. After Wat Buchanon died, his friend Scott Watson entirely rewrote Red Ryder keeping the manual in a similar humorous style. Watson's releases were a standalone Macintosh applications programmed in C and the new author expanded features taking into account requests from Red Ryder users. The application was distributed as a shareware until version 9.4, starting with release 10.0 in 1987 Red Ryder became a commercial program. Owing to a trademark dispute, the Red Ryder name was discontinued in 1989 (10.3 being the last release) and replaced by White Knight in 1990 (starting in version 11).

== Features ==
Red Ryder was the first Mac telecommunication application to support big screens and choice of fonts. The program emulates several terminals (ASCII TTY (teletype), VT52 and VT100) and supports many file transfer protocols (uploading/downloading using XMODEM, YMODEM or Kermit; downloading using the CompuServe B protocol) with MacBinary file format. The application includes a procedure language and can be controlled by user defined macros. Registered users could set up their own Bulletin board system using Red Ryder Host. Highly flexible settings allow to use nearly any modem and Red Ryder also offers phone books for often used phone numbers and services.

== Reception ==
Both Macintosh and general computing magazines rated Red Ryder highly. Commended were its inexpensive price, rich settings and features and excellent support (answering user questions by phone). However, documentation included only few examples and with so many configuration options Red Ryder was somewhat hard to learn. Commercial release 10 was also not compatible with version 9.x procedures. Despite powerful features and popularity among home users, Red Ryder was never successful in the business market, which preferred MacTerminal by Apple or Smartcom II by Hayes. By words of an InfoWorld review, Red Ryder "tries to be too many things at once" and "it's not practical for a typical business user".

== See also ==
- Second Sight (software)
