= The Iraq War: A Historiography of Wikipedia Changelogs =

2010 book artwork by James Bridle

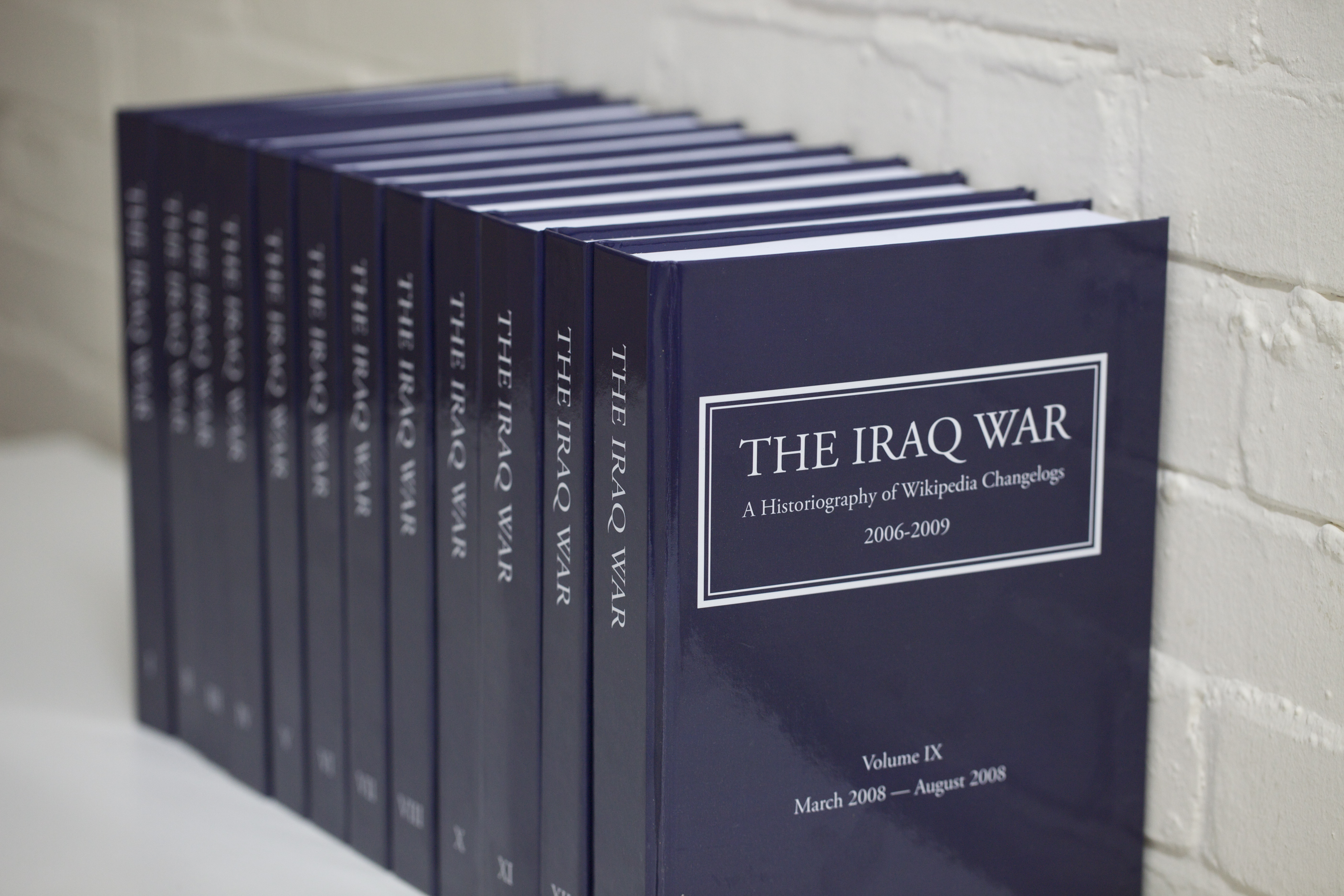
The only copy of the 12-volume set

The Iraq War: A Historiography of Wikipedia Changelogs is a 2010 book artwork compiled by British artist and technology writer James Bridle. It consists of a 12-volume, 7,000-page set of printed books that show all 12,000 changes made to the English Wikipedia article on the Iraq War from December 2004 to November 2009. The books are an artistic visualization of the changes made to a particular article at Wikipedia. Only one copy was made; the set has not been published and was not intended for sale. The books have been exhibited in galleries in the United States and in Europe.

== About ==
The work is a historiography compiled by technology writer James Bridle. It contains changelogs of the page for the Wikipedia article on the Iraq War, including arguments, opinions and vandalism. The work shows the editing process for an article and the process of creation, which includes the opinions and biases of many contributors.

The author created their book as a demonstration of the process of making history. They say:

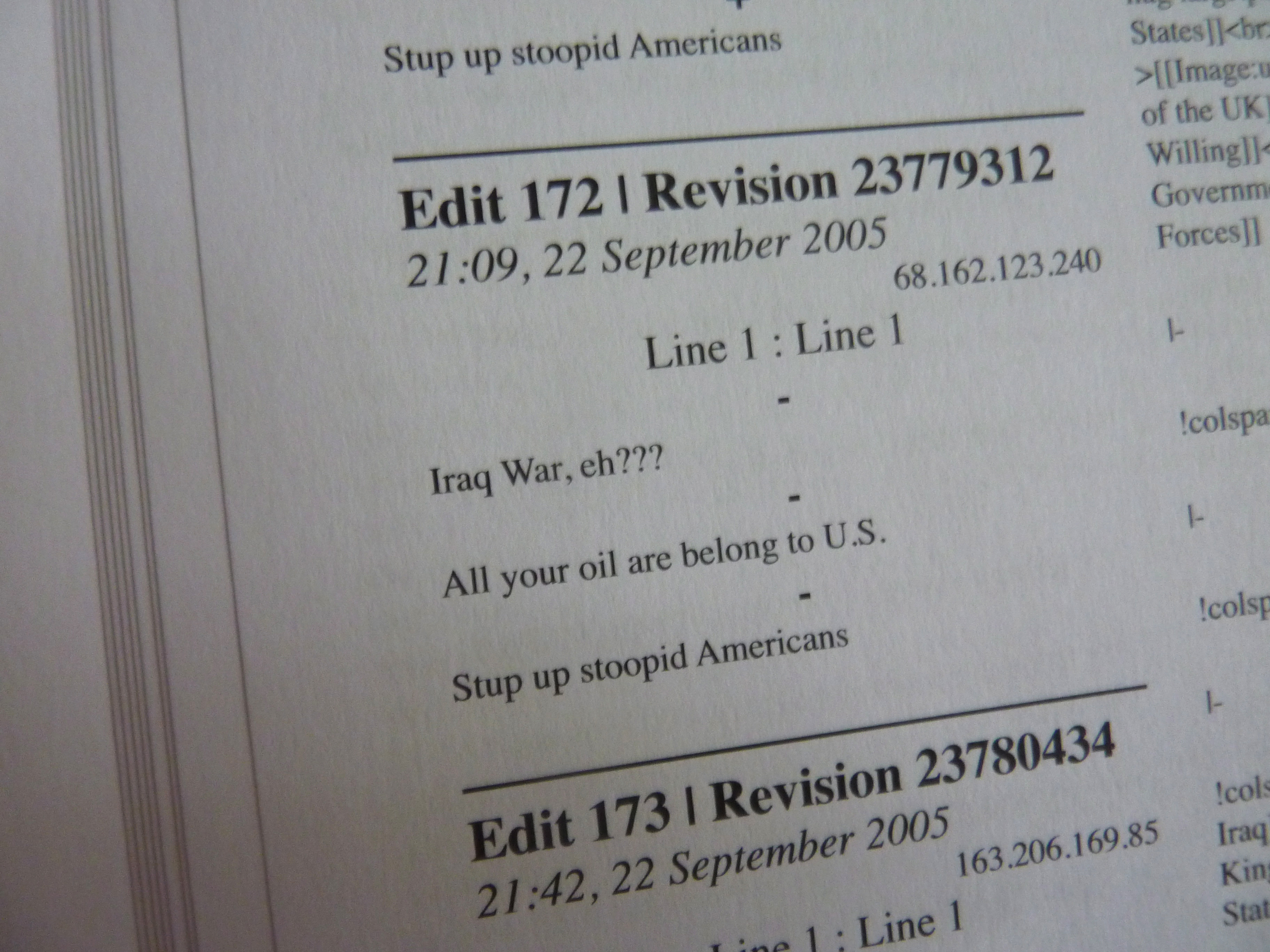
Detail of a page

[Wikipedia's] not only a resource for collating all human knowledge, but a framework for understanding how that knowledge came to be and to be understood; what was allowed to stand and what was not; what we agree on, and what we cannot... Everything should have a history button. We need to talk about historiography, to surface this process, to challenge absolutist narratives of the past, and thus, those of the present and our future.

The project encourages viewers to think of editing contributions and the collections of commentary and disagreement as part of the historical record. It is also an exploration of how recent contributions to various media supplant older contributions and what content may be lost when scholars have access only to the latest publications. Bridle has stated that, despite the history button being on every page of every article, few people use it and to them this phenomenon is the most interesting and enlightening part of Wikipedia.

== Reviews ==
A reviewer for Time described the project as a fascinating visual aid. The review in ReadWriteWeb was that the work was "pretty awesome".

== See also ==
- Bibliography of Wikipedia
