= Chandani: The Daughter of the Elephant Whisperer =

- Directed by: Arne Birkenstock
- Written by: Arne Birkenstock
- Starring: K.G. Chandani Renuka Ratnayake; K.G. Sunamabanda; Mohammed Muinudeen Raheem
- Cinematography: Marcus Winterbauer
- Edited by: Felix Bach; Timothy McLeish
- Music by: Dürbeck & Dohmen
- Release date: 2010
- Running time: 88 minutes
- Countries: Germany; Sri Lanka
- Language: Sinhalese

Chandani: The Daughter of the Elephant Whisperer is a 2010 documentary by Arne Birkenstock. It tells the story of a Sinhalese girl, Chandani, who wants to break with tradition by becoming a mahout (a traditionally male occupation) like her father.

It was awarded with the German Film Award as best Children's Feature and as Best Documentary at the Chicago International Children's Film Festival.
