= Waghoba: Provider, Destroyer, Deity =

Waghoba
- Directed by: Malaika Vaz
- Written by: Malaika Vaz
- Produced by: Sandesh Kadur
- Cinematography: Nitya Sood
- Edited by: Nitya Sood
- Production company: Felis Creations
- Release date: 2016
- Country: India
- Languages: English, Marathi

Waghoba: Provider, Destroyer, Deity is a 2016 documentary short film about Indian tigers and their relationships with human society. It is directed and written by Malaika Vaz and produced by Sandesh Kadur. The film helped win the National Geographic ROAD Talent award for Wildscreen Festival.

== Story ==
Malaika Vaz travels through the contrast between human emotion and tiger based on a series on incidents which took place in a newly developed sanctuary Umred Karhandla Wildlife Sanctuary, Maharastra, India. The film shows the ground reality of Human Animal Conflict from loss of property and life to social disruptions.

The story moves through three faces, where Waghoba or the tiger goddess is considered as the provider, who becomes the destroyer and finally becomes the Deity. The story ends with showing how changes in the environmental relationship in the society can change the mindset of people and reduce Human Animal Conflict. The film gives an idea how people are choose to be the messengers between common man and Waghoba and the respect people has towards tiger in India.

The film also shows how, Rohit Karoo, known as the gift of tomorrows tigers, could bring a positive change in the villages around the sanctuary. He is the founding secretary of the Wildlife Conservation and Development Centre (WLCDC) and Honorary Wildlife Warden of Nagpur district. It also speaks about Rohits work of reclaiming the barren land around the sanctuary and restore it to forest.

== Recognition ==
The film has been screened at many international film festivals and was instrumental in achieving the National Geographic award at Windscreen Festival 2016, which took place at Bristol, UK.

== Team ==
The film was written and directed by Malaika Vaz, who is one of the youngest wildlife presenters. The cinematography was done by Nitya Sood, who was a part of BBC Planet Earth II crew. The team made the film while they were working together at Felis Creations, a visual arts company by National Geographic Explorer Sandesh Kadur.

== Nominations ==
- 2016 Kuala Lumpur, Malaysia
- 2016 Planet in Focus Environmental Film Festival, Toronto, Canada
- 2017 Wild and Scenic Film Festival Nevada City, California
- 2017 Reel Earth Environmental Film Festival, New Zealand
