= Second Sight (2008 film) =

2008 Canadian film

- Film poster
- Directed by: Alison McAlpine
- Produced by: Alison McAlpine
- Cinematography: Alison McAlpine; John Walker; Kim Derko
- Edited by: Alison McAlpine
- Music by: John Gzowski
- Production company: Second Sight Pictures
- Release date: 2008
- Running time: 51 minutes
- Country: Canada
- Languages: English; Scottish Gaelic

Second Sight is a Canadian film directed by Alison McAlpine and released in 2008. It is a nonfiction ghost story. The film was critically acclaimed by such publications as The Montreal Gazette and The Globe & Mail.^{,}

The movie is a mystery tale filmed on the Isle of Skye, featuring Donald Angus MacLean and the last generation of a Scottish Gaelic oral tradition. Second Sight was presented at more than 35 international film festivals, winning the Special Jury Mention at the 2009 Slamdance Film Festival.^{,} The BBC also commissioned the author, filmmaker Alison McAlpine, to make two versions of Second Sight: An Da Shealladh for BBC Alba (2005) and Ghostman of Skye (2009) for the series Wonderland on BBC2.

SFGATE.com summarizes the film: "For residents of the remote Isle of Skye, seeing dead people isn't all that extraordinary. At least that's the implication of this delightful documentary by Canadian Alison McAlpine, who says she was inspired by images of Scotland from her childhood and hearing stories from her great-grandmother." The review of the publication Toronto Screen Shots also says that the filmmaker "certainly captures the overall eeriness of the subject while at the same time framing the beautiful landscape that is Scotland north". The Montreal Gazette also says that "Alison McAlpine's glorious hour-long tribute to the great characters and laid-back way of life on the remote Scottish Isle of Skye has a misty-twisty Gaelic quality uniquely appropriate to the subject of ghosts".
