= Second Sight (software) =

- Original author: Scott Watson
- Developer: The FreeSoft Company
- Type: BBS

Second Sight, originally Red Ryder Host, was a commercial bulletin board system (BBS) written by Scott Watson, who founded The FreeSoft Company of Beaver Falls, Pennsylvania, for the Macintosh. It was the second program from Watson, the first being the Red Ryder (later White Knight) terminal emulator. Second Sight was a traditional text-based BBS system, unlike products like TeleFinder and FirstClass which supported a graphical-user interface. Starting with version 3.0 in 1994, the program supported multiple nodes running on the same Mac, limited by the number of NuBus slots occupied with a serial port card.

Scott introduced Second Sight in the same way as Red Ryder, by posting it on bulletin boards. The software was originally released as shareware under the name Red Ryder Host. By then, Watson operated his own bulletin board. Watson explained how his marketing evolved:

Bulletin boards help distribution. Our store sales tripled in three years since going into stores. There has been a switch-over. As volume increased (with no overhead increase), our cost per disk dropped.

At the end of our third year selling to the trade, we began to sell through a distributor, Ingram-Micro D. At the same time we started to advertise. We began to run for six months a full-page ad in three Mac magazines. As soon as the ads started, we had a big burst of sales.

Staring with version 2.0 in 1990, the software was renamed to Second Sight, owing to a trademark dispute that also saw FreeSoft rename Red Ryder to White Knight.

== Reception ==
Bob LeVitus and Andy Ihnatko writing in the book Dr. Macintosh's Guide to the On-Line Universe called Second Sight "the de facto standard for BBS software among Macs as well as "the only serious program to consider when running a BBS on a Mac". They noted the large amount of third-party software for Second Sight that extended its feature set and wrote that a user could "start off with a trivially simple BBS, and years later have an internationally based system mangling thousands of messages a day". Author Carla Rose on the other hand wrote that, like White Knight, Second Sight "appeals to some Mac users but completely turns off others". She found that TeleFinder and FirstClass were "a great deal more 'Mac-like'" on account of their GUIs.
