= Frauke Sandig =

German film director and screenwriter

Frauke Sandig (born 1961) is a German film director, screenwriter and producer.

== Biography ==
Frauke Sandig studied drama and German literature at the University of Erlangen. She became a commissioning editor in 1992 at the documentary department of Deutsche Welle, where she has created numerous documentaries and documentary series as both author and director, including the documentary Transit Camp Friedland which premiered in 2015 in the Friedland refugee camp in Lower Saxony.

Since the 1990s, she has also produced and directed documentaries together with Eric Black for cinema and public television in Germany and the US. Their films have been officially selected for over 200 international film festivals, including the Sundance Film Festival, Berlin International Film Festival, IDFA and DokLeipzig. Frauke Sandig is a member of the German Film Academy.

== Filmography ==
Sandig's first feature-length documentary Oskar and Jack, which premiered at the San Francisco International Film Festival, tells the story of an unusual pair of identical twins: One of the boys grew up as a Jew, the other as a Hitler Youth. After the Fall, the following cinema documentary was made in collaboration with the American director Eric Black. The film documenting the mysterious disappearance of the Berlin Wall premiered at the Berlin International Film Festival in 2000 and won the Golden Spire at the Golden Gate Awards in San Francisco. Frozen Angels (2005) premiered at the Sundance Film Festival in 2005. In their German-American co-production, Sandig and Black described the world of artificial reproduction in Los Angeles. Heart of Sky, Heart of Earth (2011), their following film, which premiered internationally at IDFA Amsterdam, shows the struggle of the Mayan peoples of today against the destruction of their environment and culture. AWARE: Glimpses of Consciousness, a documentary about six researchers who approach the mystery of consciousness from radically different perspectives had theatrical releases in Germany and in the US and was aired on PBS’ Independent Lens in 2022.

== Awards ==
- Golden Gate Award San Francisco International Film Festival: Golden Spire for After the Fall,
- Special Mention German Camera Prize for After the Fall
- Audience Award, Festival Visions du Réel in Nyon, for Frozen Angels
- Nomination, Grand Jury Prize, Sundance Film Festival for Frozen Angels
- Prix Graine de Cinéphage, Women's Film Festival Créteil for Frozen Angels
- Planet in Focus, Toronto, Best International Feature, for Heart of Sky, Heart of Earth
- German Nature Film Prize, Audience Award for Heart of Sky, Heart of Earth
- First Prize (Premio Pukañawi) International Human Rights Film Festival Bolivia for Heart of Sky, Heart of Earth
- Grimme-Award Nomination for Strangers – Young Immigrants in Germany
- Feature Competition Jury Prize, Illuminate Film Festival 2021 for AWARE – Glimpses of Consciousness
- Online-Audience Award at Millennium Docs Against Gravity Film Festival, Poland for AWARE – Glimpses of Consciousness
- „Create the Future Award“ at Maui Film Festival 2021 for AWARE – Glimpses of Consciousness
- Premio Pukañawi, International Human Rights Film Festival Bolivia for AWARE – Glimpses of Consciousness
- Prize of the Jury, Science Film Festival 2022 for AWARE – Glimpses of Consciousness
- Wisdom Award, Auroville Film Festival 2024 for AWARE – Glimpses of Consciousness
