= James Bridle =

British visual artist and writer

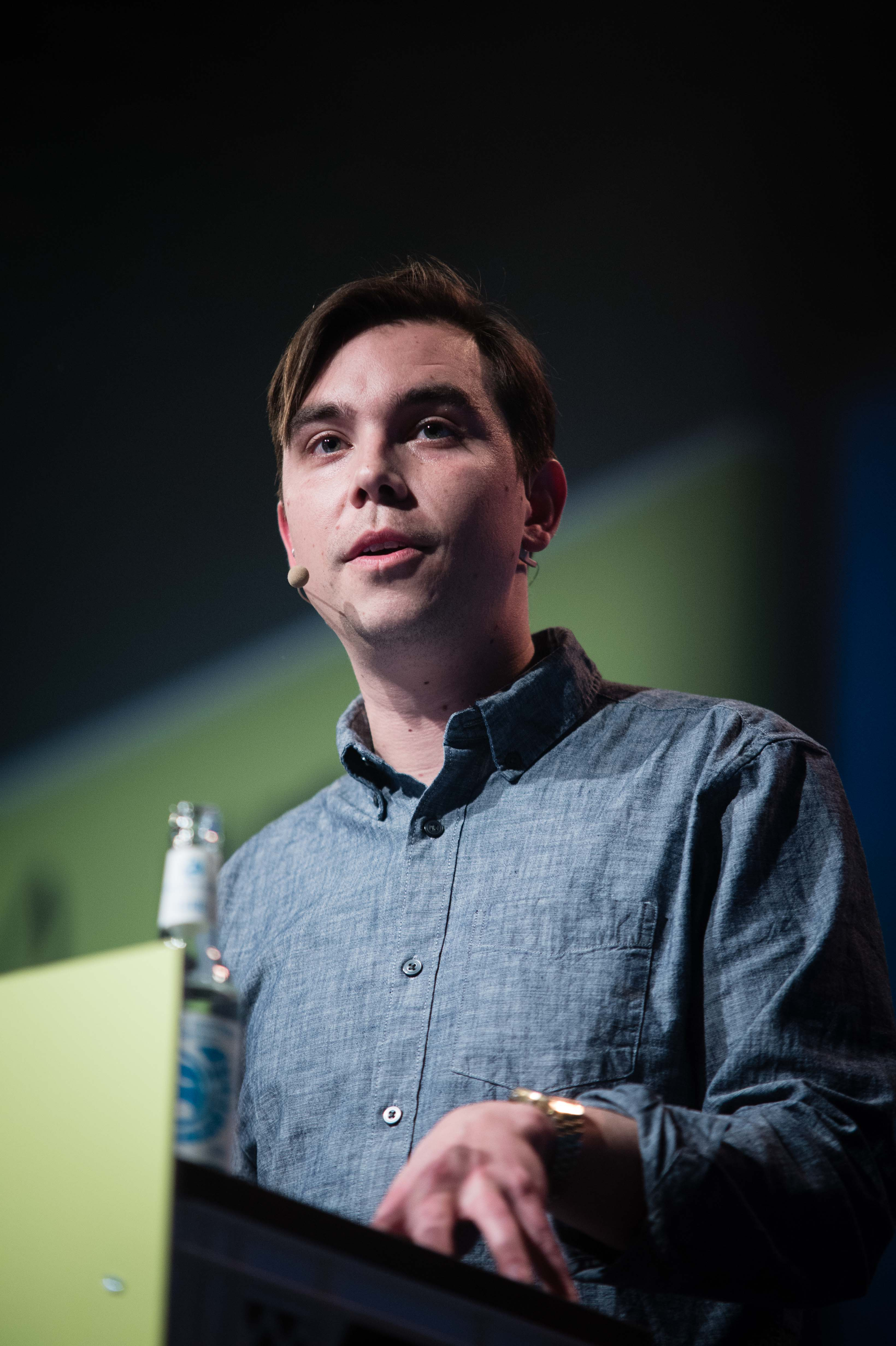
- Bridle in 2015
- Born: 1980 (age 44–45)
- Notable work: The New Dark Age (2018), Ways of Being (2022)
- Website: jamesbridle.com

James Bridle (born 1980) is an artist and author based in Athens, Greece. Bridle, whose work "deals with the ways in which the digital, networked world reaches into the physical, offline one," coined the New Aesthetic. Their work has explored aspects of the Western security apparatus, including drones and asylum-seeker deportations. Bridle has written for WIRED, Icon, Domus, Cabinet Magazine, The Atlantic, New Statesman, Financial Times and many other publications, and wrote a regular column for The Guardian.

== Career ==
Bridle received their master's degree in computer science and cognitive science from University College London, with their dissertation on "creative applications of artificial intelligence."

They have served as adjunct professor on the Interactive Telecommunications Program at New York University.

Bridle came to CERN as 'Guest Artist' in March 2017. In 2018 they curated the Berlin art exhibition "Agency," a group show featuring works of the artists Morehshin Allahyari, Sophia Al Maria, Ingrid Burrington, Navine Khan-Dossos, Constant Dullaart, Anna Ridler and Suzanne Treister at Nome Gallery. Topics were mass surveillance and transnational terrorism, climate change and conspiracy theories, anti-social media and rapacious capitalism.

In April 2019, BBC Radio 4 broadcast a four-part series by Bridle called "New Ways of Seeing" examining how technology influences culture, an analogue to John Berger’s Ways of Seeing. In March 2020 Bridle presented a keynote address at the Spy on me 2 festival (held in Berlin and online). Their 2019 film Se ti sabir that has its starting point in the Mediterranean Lingua Franca, premiered on 19 March 2020 in Berlin. Because of the COVID-19 pandemic, it had to be streamed on the HAU-YouTube channel.

In 2024, the Schelling Architecture Foundation rescinded their €10,000 architecture theory prize to Bridle after Bridle's signature on an open letter, along with thousands of other writers and artists, committing to the Palestinian Campaign for the Academic and Cultural Boycott of Israel, that states: "We will not work with Israeli cultural institutions that are complicit or have remained silent observers of the overwhelming oppression of Palestinians.” Bridle was quoted as remarking on the irony in that their 2022 book Ways of Being, for which they were to receive the prize, addresses Israel’s “apartheid wall” in the West Bank and draws a link between genocide and ecocide. Notably, the foundation is named after German architect Erich Schelling, who was a member of the German Nazi party and of its Sturmabteilung paramilitary, and was involved in the construction of the offices of the party newspaper Der Führer.

Bridle's artworks and installations have been exhibited in Europe, North and South America, Asia and Australia.

== In popular culture ==
For their 2022 book on the nature of intelligence, Ways of Being, they were interviewed by Brian Eno at a 5x15 event.

== Works ==
- The Iraq War: A Historiography of Wikipedia Changelogs, 2010
- New Dark Age: Technology and the End of the Future, Verso, 2018, ISBN 9781786635471
- Ways of Being: Animals, Plants, Machines: The Search for a Planetary Intelligence, Farrar, Straus & Giroux, 2022, ISBN 9780374601119
