= André Erkau =

German film director

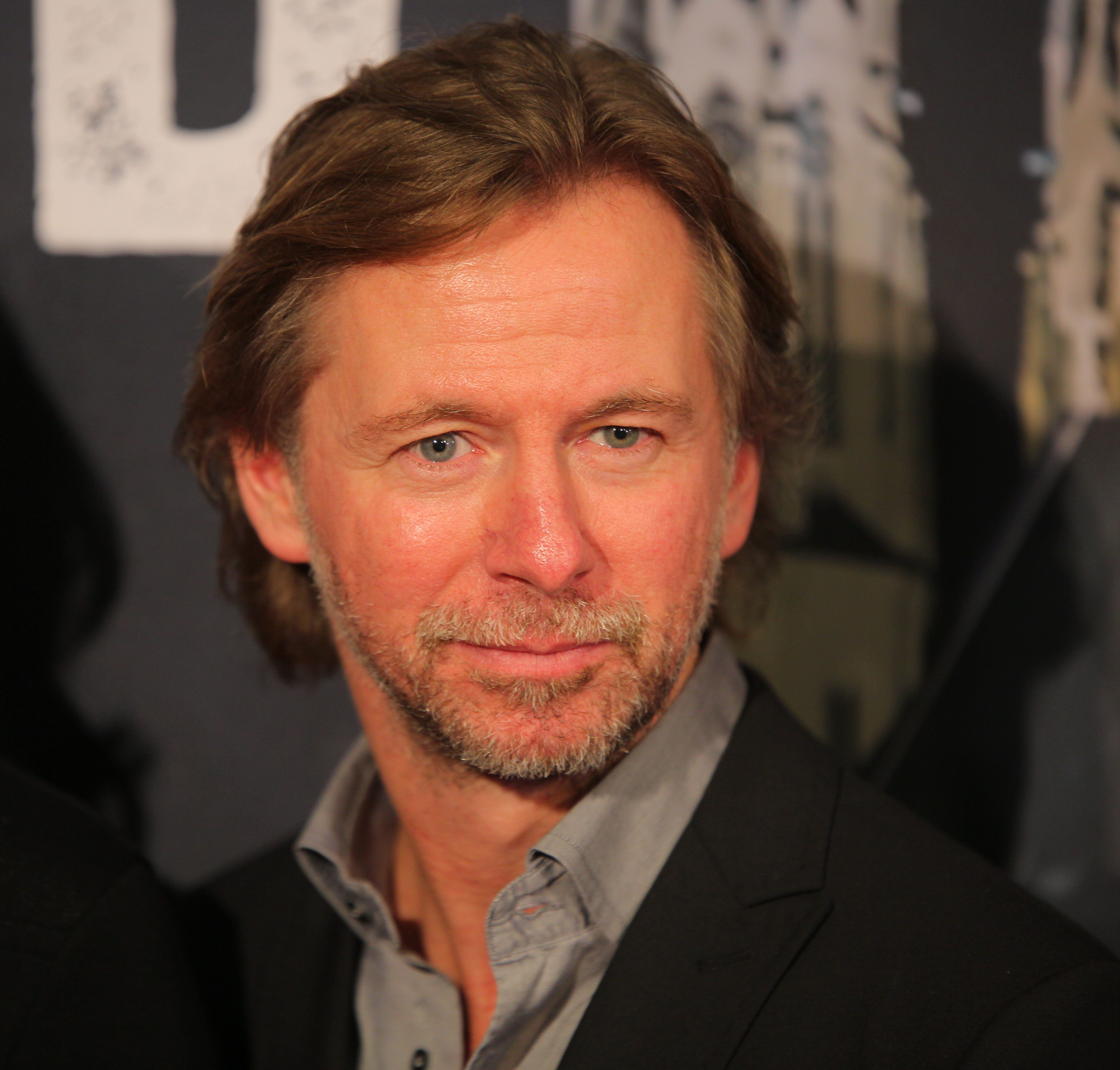
- Erkau in 2016
- Born: 17 August 1968 (age 58); Dortmund, West Germany
- Occupations: Film director, screenwriter
- Years active: 2001–present

André Erkau (born 1968) is a German film director and screenwriter.

== Life and work ==
Born in Dortmund, Erkau grew up in Bremen. After he completed his actor's training, he worked for theatre and TV. In 2001, he began to study film direction at the Academy of Media Arts in Cologne. He finished his study in 2005 with his diploma-movie 37 ohne Zwiebeln. This short film won more than twenty film awards and was in 2006 one of Germany's most successful short films. His first cine film, Come In and Burn Out, also received awards.

== Selected filmography ==
- 1993: Nicht von schlechten Eltern (German TV series, actor)
- 2001: fabrixx (German TV series, actor)
- 2003: Verkauftes Land (German TV movie, actor)
- 2006: 37 ohne Zwiebeln (direction, screenplay, producer)
- 2008: Come In and Burn Out (Selbstgespräche), (direction, screenplay)
- 2011: Alive and Ticking (actor)
- 2011: No More Mr. Ice Guy (direction, screenplay)
- 2012: Das Leben ist nichts für Feiglinge (direction)
- 2014: Tatort - Wahre Liebe (German TV series, direction)
- 2015: Winnetous Sohn (direction)
- 2015: Tatort - Schwanensee (German TV series, direction, screenplay)

== Awards and nominations ==
- 37 ohne Zwiebeln (2006)

- 2006: Winner of the Audience Award in the category Hanse Short at the Hamburg International Short Film Festival
- 2006: Winner of the Audience Award and Best short Film award at the Filmfestival Max Ophüls Preis in Saarbrücken
- 2006: Winner of the ProSieben Young Directors Award in the category Best Director at the Munich International Festival of Film Schools
- 2006: Winner of the Studio Hamburg Newcomer Award in the category Best Screenplay at the Studio Hamburg Newcomer Award

- Come In and Burn Out (2008)

- 2008: Winner of the Max Ophüls Award at the Filmfestival Max Ophüls Preis in Saarbrücken

- Das Leben ist nichts für Feiglinge (2012)

- 2012: Nominated for the Best German Language Feature Film at Zürich Film Festival
- 2014: Nominated for the Best German Film at the Jupiter Awards
