= Ways of Being =

2022 book by James Bridle

- First edition
- Author: James Bridle
- Publisher: Farrar, Straus and Giroux (UK), Verso Books (US)
- Publication date: 2022
- ISBN: 9780374601119

Ways of Being is a 2022 book on artificial intelligence and the natural world by James Bridle.

A reviewer for The American Spectator said that the theme of the book was collaborative intelligence among humans, computers, and all of nature.

A reviewer for Geographical said that the book described situations where humans developed remarkable new technology by observing natural processes.

A reviewer for Kirkus Reviews described the book as scientifically precise but accessible to general audiences.

Musician Brian Eno met with the author to discuss creativity in nature.
