= Richard Boothby =

American philosopher

Academic background
- Education: Boston University (PhD)
- Thesis: Language, Desire, and Death in Psychoanalysis: A Philosophical Reading of Lacan's Return of Freud (1987)
- Doctoral advisor: William J. Richardson, Erazim Kohák

Academic work
- Era: Contemporary philosophy
- Region: Western philosophy
- School or tradition: German Idealism
- Institutions: Loyola University Maryland
- Website: https://www.loyola.edu/academics/philosophy/faculty/boothby-richard.html

Richard Perkins Boothby is a professor of philosophy at Loyola University Maryland.

== Life and works ==
Boothby received his A.B. from Yale University in 1977 and his Ed.M. in 1979 from Harvard University. In 1987 he defended his PhD dissertation on "Language, Desire, and Death in Psychoanalysis: A Philosophical Reading of Lacan's Return of Freud " in Boston University.

=== Selected publications ===
- Boothby, Richard (1995). Death and Desire (RLE: Lacan): Psychoanalytic Theory in Lacan's Return to Freud. Routledge. doi:10.4324/9781315851570. ISBN 978-1-317-91610-9.
- Boothby, Richard (2001). Freud as Philosopher: Metapsychology After Lacan. Routledge. doi:10.4324/9781315870403. ISBN 978-1-317-97259-4.
- Boothby, Richard (2006). Sex on the Couch: What Freud still has to teach us about sex and gender. Routledge. doi:10.4324/9781315880907. ISBN 978-1-134-72963-0.
- Boothby, Richard (2022). Blown Away: Refinding Life After My Son's Suicide. Other Press, LLC. ISBN 978-1-63542-260-3.
- Boothby, Richard (2023). Embracing the Void: Rethinking the Origin of the Sacred. Northwestern University Press. doi:10.2307/j.ctv34h0990. ISBN 978-0-8101-4539-9. JSTOR j.ctv34h0990.
