= Heart of Sky, Heart of Earth =

- Directed by: Frauke Sandig, Eric Black
- Produced by: Frauke Sandig, Eric Black
- Cinematography: Black
- Edited by: Grete Jentzen
- Music by: Arturo Pantaleón
- Release date: November 2011
- Running time: 98 minutes
- Countries: Germany, USA

Heart of Sky, Heart of Earth is a feature-length documentary film on the indigenous Maya in Mexico and Guatemala and their opposition to gold mining in their nation.

== Synopsis ==
The film portrays six indigenous Maya in Guatemala and Chiapas, Mexico, showing their daily and ceremonial lives.

In the film, the young indigenous fight against the Marlin Mine in Guatemala. They oppose the environmental cost of gold exploration and demand social and environmental justice.

According to their traditions, the Maya believe that they are guardians of the earth. Their cosmovision, in which all life is sacred and interconnected, is portrayed as a compelling alternative to the exploitation and destruction of the planet.

== Release and reception ==
Heart of Sky, Heart of Earth had its international premiere at the International Documentary Festival Amsterdam (Masters Section) after its German premiere at DokLeipzig, The film was screened at over a hundred international film festivals and was awarded first prize at Planet in Focus, Toronto, the Audience Award at the German Nature Film Prize and all three top awards in Montreal's First Peoples Festival.

The film won awards or opened every human rights festival in both Central and South America. The film had a theatrical release in Germany and Japan and was the opening film of the 2012 Human Rights Film Festival at the National Theater of Guatemala. The film is the first part of the 'Heart of Sky, Heart of Earth - Trilogy'. The second part, the feature-length documentary "AWARE - Glimpses of Consciousness" premiered at Hof International Film Festival 2020.

=== Critical response ===
Thomas Assheuer wrote in Die Zeit:

"It is quite possible our great corporations will succeed in finishing Nature off and plant genetically modified corn over its burnt out remains. It is quite possible they will intimidate and expel the Indigenous from their lands. On the other hand, resistance is growing... If one is searching for impressive evidence of this tenacious determination, Heart of Sky, Heart of Earth is it."

Peter von Becker writes in the Tagesspiegel: A great, quiet, disturbing film". Peter Gutting in Kino-Zeit wrote:

This different relationship to nature is better described with pictures than with words. Heart of Sky, Heart of Earth does exactly this, with clouds that glow from within, rivers with power one can sense, or mountains, which exude an inner peace. The camerawork creates settings that inspire fascination in a hitherto unknown world..

=== Festivals ===
- International Documentary Festival Amsterdam (IDFA) Masters Section
- DokLeipzig
- Margaret Mead Film Festival
- Vancouver International Film Festival
- Mill Valley International Film Festival
- Havana International Film Festival
- Thessaloniki International Documentary Festival

=== Awards ===
- Planet in Focus, Toronto, First Prize (Best International Feature)
- German Nature Film Prize, Audience Award
- First Prize (Premio Pukañawi) International Human Rights Film Festival Bolivia
- Special Jury Mention, DocsDF, Mexico City
- Special Jury Mention, International Film Festival and Forum on Human Rights in Geneva
- Special Jury Mention, Human Rights Film Festival Buenos Aires
- Best Documentary, Best Cinematography and 2nd Teueikan Prize at the First Peoples Festival Montreal in co-presentation with RIDM
- Silver Chris Award, Columbus International Film Festival
- Best Director, Baikal Film Festival People and Environment
