= Malaika Vaz =

Indian explorer and filmmaker (born 1997)

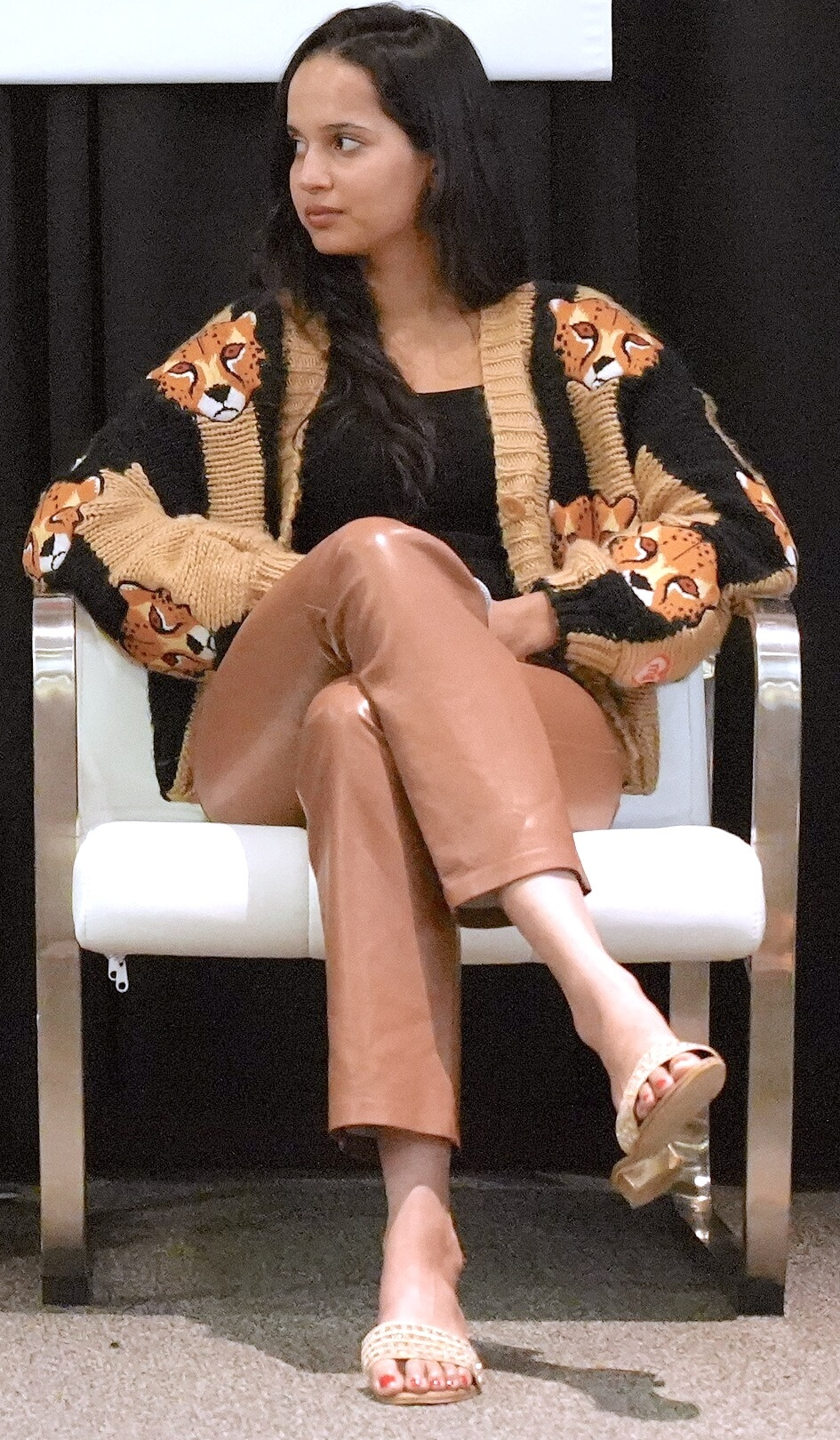
- Vaz in 2025, at SXSW
- Born: 13 April 1997 (age 29); Saligao, Goa, India
- Education: United World Colleges
- Occupations: Athlete; environmentalist; social entrepreneur

Malaika Vaz (born 13 April 1997) is an Indian National Geographic explorer, television presenter, and wildlife filmmaker. She is the youngest person to reach the Arctic and the Antarctic, with the Students on Ice foundation.

In 2018, she presented the TV series On The Brink for Discovery Channel and Animal Planet, that follows her journey exploring the many endangered species across India together with the stories of researchers and scientists involved in protecting them. She is currently working on an investigative documentary on the illegal trafficking of Manta Rays across Southeast Asia. As a National Geographic Explorer Malaika produced and presented a 3 part series on human-wildlife coexistence titled Living With Predators. She is also an environmental activist.

== Early and personal life ==
Malaika Vaz was born to Marusha Vaz and Mac Vaz, and has two younger brothers, Mikhail and Marc. As a windsurfer, sailor and Professional Association of Diving Instructors Divemaster, she has developed a strong connection to the ocean and has witnessed the effects of unsustainable tourism on the Marine ecosystem.

This inspired her to campaign for ecological protection and work towards conserving India's natural resources through initiatives such as the Leave No Trace campaign, that reduced plastic waste drastically at Asia's largest music festival Sunburn held at Candolim, Goa, India.

More recently, Vaz became a naturalized Portuguese citizen having received her Portuguese passport.

== Education ==
Malaika was educated at Sharada Mandir School in Goa, and then represented India, along with students from 92 other countries, at UWC Mahindra College.

== Social work ==
Through her non-profit organization Kriyā (meaning "deed" or "action" in Sanskrit), Malaika works to empower women; victims of sexual violence and disadvantaged teenage girls through adventure sport and outdoor education.

Under Malaika's guidance, the Kriyā Ambassadors summited Stok Kangri and Lungser Kangri in the Indian Himalayas to raise money for the Sherpa communities in the Khumbu Valley who were devastated by the April 2015 Nepal earthquake.

== Filmography ==
Year	Title	Credit	Genre	Episodes	Network	Comments
2022	Mission: Sustainable Health	Presenter	Health Documentary	2	Bupa	
2018	On The Brink	Presenter	TV series		Discovery Channel, Animal Planet	
2016	Waghoba: Provider, Destroyer, Deity	Director / Presenter	Wildlife Documentary			
2009	Spotlight with Malaika	Presenter	TV series		Herald Channel Network	

== Awards ==
- 2018 National Youth Award winner
- 2016 State Youth Award, Directorate of Sports and Youth Affairs, Government of Goa for outstanding contribution in the field of social service.
- 2016 National Geographic ROAR Talent bursary for Wildscreen Festival 2016
- 2015 Young Environmentalist by Saevus Magazine.
- 2015 Brand Ambassador Woodland
- 2012 Brand Ambassador Victorinox.
