= Raphael Fellmer =

Dutch activist

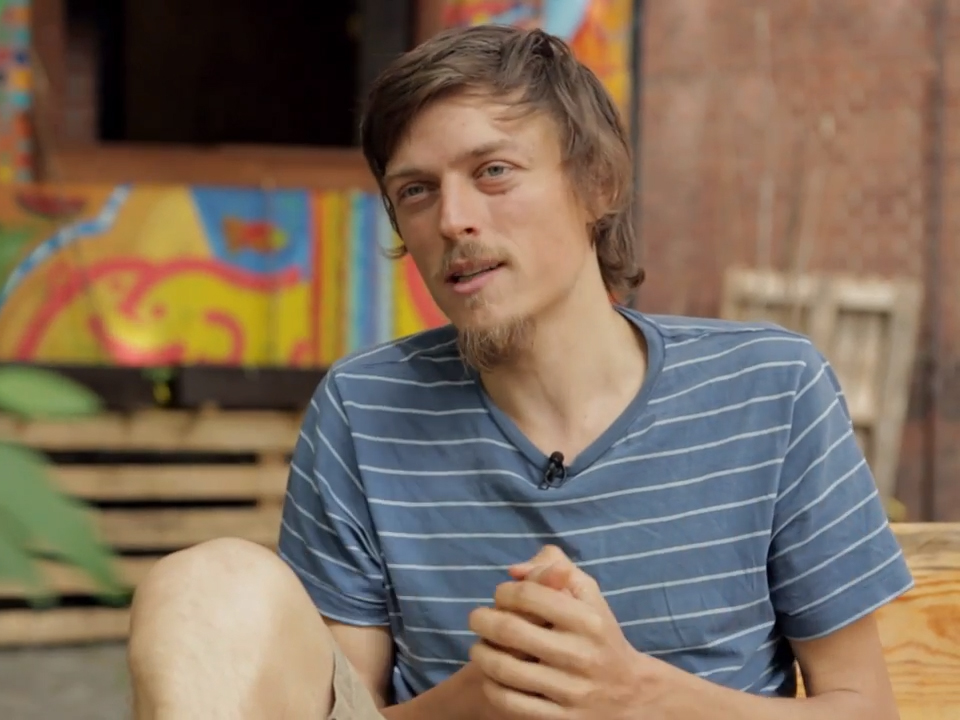
Raphael Fellmer, 2016

Raphael Fellmer (born 1983) lived from 2010 until 2015 in a money strike, which started with a moneyless journey from The Netherlands to Mexico. He is an activist, who lived without money to raise awareness and makes use of surplus of the consumer society. To fight food waste, he created a foodsaving movement, a network which collected and shared more than 3 million kilogram of food. He is co-founder of foodsharing.de, where people can share their leftover food instead of throwing them away. In 2015 together with friends he founded yunity, a multi-sharing and saving platform.

He was born in 1983 in Berlin and went to school there. In 2011 he returned with his wife and lived there with their two children until 2015 when he moved close to Stuttgart.

== Biography ==
Fellmer studied at The Hague University of Applied Sciences.

In 2010, a journey from the Netherlands to Mexico became a turning point in his life. A backpack for the journey was the last thing he has bought. He and his friends crossed the Atlantic for free, as they paid for it by taking care of the boat on which they travelled. They hitchhiked in Mexico, worked for food and accommodation.

When he came back to Berlin, he was first looking for food in the garbage. Later he started to get food that was approaching or past best-before date and that the shops were not able to sell. He then founded the website Foodsharing to support the exchange of things people have no use for.

Fellmer himself lives with no money, his wife uses the equivalent of around $280 per month (2013) from savings and a government child subsidy when she needs to pay for health care or food for their children.

"Originally I wanted to become a millionaire to be able to help people," says Fellmer.

In 2017, the translation of his book into Portuguese was published on his homepage.

== Bibliography ==
- Fellmer, Raphael: Glücklich ohne Geld! (Happy without money)
