= Valentin Thurn =

German film maker, writer and director (born 1963)

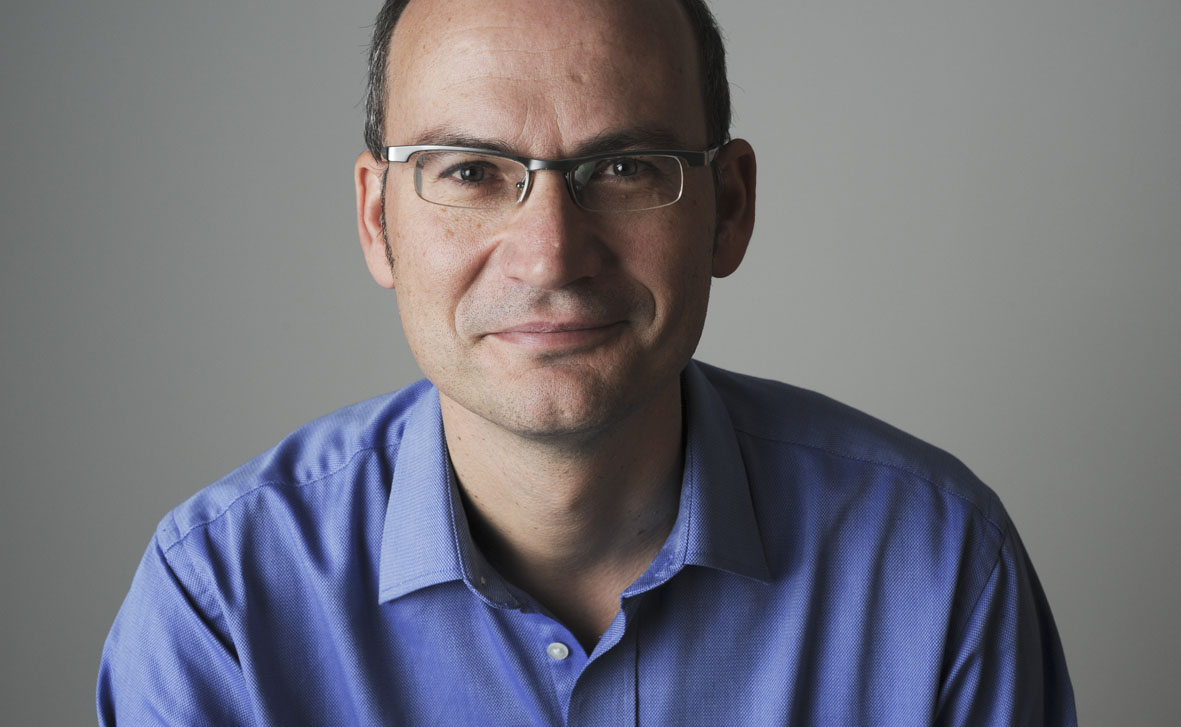
- Born: 1963 (age 62–63); Stuttgart, Germany
- Citizenship: German
- Occupations: Filmmaker, writer and director
- Notable work: Founder of the Thurn Film production company; Founder of food sharing website Foodsharing.de

Valentin Thurn (born 1963, Stuttgart, Germany) is a German documentary filmmaker, journalist, author and producer. He created the 2010 documentary Taste the Waste. He is also the co-founder of the International Federation of Environmental Journalists.

His work focuses on food systems, agriculture, sustainability and environmental issues. Through documentaries shown in cinemas and on public broadcasters, he has contributed to public debate on food waste, global food security and sustainable food production.

== Early life ==
Valentin Thurn was born in 1963 in Stuttgart, Germany.

He studied geography, ethnology and politics in Frankfurt, Cologne and Aix-en-Provence, graduating with a degree in geography. In 1985/1986, he also completed training as an editor at the German School of Journalism in Munich.

== Career ==
The television documentaries that he has written and directed have received awards and have been aired for numerous national German broadcasters. He is the founder of the Cologne-based Thurn Film production company which began in 1994.

Thurn gained international recognition with the documentary Taste the Waste, which premiered at the 2011 Berlin International Film Festival. The film investigates food waste throughout the global food chain and examines the environmental, economic and social consequences of large-scale food loss. It was released internationally and received considerable media attention for bringing the issue of food waste to a broad audience. He interviewed everyone in the food chain which included food producers, consumers to administrators and even politicians. It won Best Film of 2011 at Germany’s Atlantis Environment and Nature Film Festival. It also got the Documentary Film Award at EKOFILM International Film Festival in the Czech Republic. Another award in Germany that the film picked up was Environmental Media Prize by the German Environmental Organisation. Reviewers described Taste the Waste as one of the first feature-length documentaries to comprehensively examine food waste from agricultural production to household consumption. Critics highlighted its contribution to raising public awareness of the issue, although some considered its approach strongly advocacy-oriented.

In 2015 Thurn directed 10 Billion – What's on Your Plate?, a documentary exploring how a global population expected to reach ten billion can be fed sustainably. The film presents a range of perspectives, including conventional agriculture, organic farming, technological innovation and alternative food production. The documentary was screened internationally and discussed in connection with debates on climate change, agriculture and food security.

He founded the food sharing website Foodsharing.de, which was launched in January 2013. It was set up as a practical way to help to help solve food waste. The difference between this operation and food banks where people would have to prove they were needy, this one could be accessed by anybody. It was reported in November 2014 by The New York Times that in December that year, Foodsharing.de would incorporate Lebensmittelretten.de, a food sharing website which was founded by Raphael Fellmer.

He has been quoted as saying "the food industry played on consumers’ feelings to get them to buy."

In 2016, Thurn founded Germany's first food policy council in Cologne together with politicians and representatives from business and science.

In his latest film, Dream On! Longing for Change, Valentin Thurn follows five life plans of people who are looking for alternatives for themselves and society.

From 2022 to 2026, he was a member of the board of AG Dok (Working Group for Documentary Film).

== Filmography ==
- Poor in spite of work - 2023
- Cheap Meat - Who pays for the low prices? - 2021
- Dream on! Loning for change - 2021
- Farewell to the middle class - The precarious society - 2020
- Corporations as saviours? The Virtue of Multinationals - 2017
- 10 Billion - What's on your plate? (10 Milliarden - Wie werden wir alle satt?) - 2015
- Die Essensretter - 2013
- Taste the Waste - 2010
- Guillaume Depardieu - Es ist die Hölle! - 2010
- Ein Lotse fürs Leben - 2009
- The Whistleblower - Der aufsässige Staatsdiener - Ein Beamter packt aus - 2009
- Unschuldig im Knast - 2009
- Tod im Krankenhaus - 2008
- Gefundenes Fressen - 2008
- Samenspender unbekannt - 2008
- Impfen - Nur ein kleiner Nadelstich? - 2007
- Faustrecht hinter Gittern - 2007
- Mit meiner Tochter nicht - Frauen-Beschneidung in Europa - 2007
- Ich bin Al Kaida - Das Leben des Zacarias Moussaoui - 2006
- Mein Kind in deinem Bauch - 2006
- Mein Vater will mich umbringen - Frauen auf der Flucht vor Ehrenmorden - 2005
- Bittere Pillen - 2005
- Ein Kind um jeden Preis - 2005
- Der Ruf nach dem Kind - 2004
- Oh diese Beckers - ein Familie im Rampenlicht
- Papa liebt einen Mann - 2003
- Der Trail Der Toros - 2003
- Die Story (TV Series documentary), Episode: Der Arzt und die verstrahlten Kinder von Basra (2003)
