= Tim Bergmann =

German actor

- Born: 2 March 1972 (age 54); Düsseldorf, West Germany
- Occupation: Actor
- Years active: 1993-present

Tim Bergmann (born 2 March 1972) is a German actor. He appeared in more than ninety films since 1993.

== Filmography ==
Year	Title	Role	Notes
1995	Over My Dead Body	Zuhälter 2 - Pimp #2	
1996	Regular Guys	Edgar	
1998	Solo for Clarinet	Freddie Bahlo	
1998	Flanell No. 5		
1999	Bombs Under Berlin	Alex Fechtner	TV film
1999	Prototype	Marlow	TV film
1999	Your Best Years	Andreas Wolgast	TV film
2001	Moonlight Tariff	Dr. Daniel Hoffmann	
2003	Der Seerosenteich	Jon Rix	TV film
2003	How Do You Change Your Parents?	Max Hoch	TV film
2003	Cleaning Up	Frank	TV film
2004	Platinum	Hans Merensky	TV film
2007	Day of Disaster	Dietmar Fechter	TV film
2007	The Zürich Engagement	Jean Berner	TV film
2010	Sasha	Gebhard	
2011	The Cold Sky	Niklas Cromer	TV film
2012	Rommel	Oberstleutnant Von Hofacker	TV film
2013	Snow White Must Die	Oliver von Bodenstein	TV film
2015	Schattenwald	Georg	
2015	Schwester Weiß	Theo Hagedorn	
