= Julia Brendler =

German actress

- Born: 26 February 1975 (age 51); Schwedt, Bezirk Frankfurt, East Germany
- Occupation: Actress

Julia Brendler (born 26 February 1975) is a German actress.

== Biography ==
Born on 26 February 1975 in Schwedt (East Germany, now Brandenburg in Germany), she began acting at the age of 14 years. For the first role in Helmut Dzuibas' film Forbidden Love (1989) she received the Hessian film award. Then came Dagmar Hirtz' Irish drama film Moondance (1995) and the comedy horror film by Rainer Matsutani Over My Dead Body (1995). Next year, she starred with Johannes Brandrup in the production of Max Honert "Hamlet." The next attempt to appear in the English-language movie in the film "In the depths" was more or less successful. Now, Brandler plays roles in German cinema and television.

== Filmography ==
=== Films ===
- 1989: Forbidden Love
- 1992: Jana and Jan
- 1993: Angel without Wings
- 1994: Moondance
- 1995: Flight of the Albatross
- 1995: Over My Dead Body
- 1997: Sawdust Tales
- 2000: Deeply
- 2007: Wortbrot
- 2009: Phantom Pain
- 2012: Shifting the Blame
- 2016: Welcome to Iceland

=== TV films and series ===
- 1992: Born in 1999
- 1994: Eurocops (TV series, episode Three Girls)
- 1994: Die Kommissarin (television series, episode Jugendsünden)
- 1994, 1998: Der Fahnder (televisial, various roles, 2 episodes)
- 1994: Der König (TV series, episode first-class murder)
- 1994: Ärzte (TV series, 4 episodes)
- 1995: Derrick (TV series, episode Mr. Widanje dreams badly)
- 1996: The Three (TV Series, episode The Witness of the Prosecution)
- 1996: At Your Own Risk (television series, episode Bombengeschäfte)
- 1996: Terre indigo (TV series, 8 episodes)
- 1996: Deutschlandlied (TV-set)
- 1996: 2½ minutes
- 1997: Living in fear
- 1997: Tatort - Der Tod spielt mit (TV series)
- 1998: Journey to the night
- 1998: Young Love - and no one is allowed to know
- 1999: Heartless
- 1999: Un prete tra noi (TV series, 2 episodes)
- 1999: Die Verbrechen des Professor Capellari - On Your Own (TV Series)
- 1999: Camino de Santiago (TV spin-off)
- 2001: Das Traumschiff - Bermudas (TV series)
- 2002: Der kleine Mönch (TV series, episode Blue Star)
- 2002: The Rosary
- 2002: Edel & Starck (TV series, episode murder is his hobby)
- 2003: Der letzte Zeuge (TV series, episode The show goes on)
- 2003: A banker to fall in love with
- 2004: Der Ermittler (TV series, episode Ice Cold Murder)
- 2005: The Pastor II - Heimweh to Hohenau
- 2006: 30 Something
- 2006: Großstadtrevier (TV series, episode children's suite)
- 2006: SOKO Wismar (TV series, episode follow-up bullying)
- 2007: Deadline – Jede Sekunde zählt (TV series, episode tunnel view)
- 2007: Tatort - The Trap
- 2007: SOKO Rhein-Main (TV series, follow-up pals from Cameroon)
- 2008, 2017: Leipzig Homicide (TV series, various roles, 2 episodes)
- 2008: Im Namen des Gesetzes (television series, episode The Death Comes Twice)
- 2009: Stauffenberg – Die wahre Geschichte
- 2009, 2014: Cologne P.D. (TV series, various roles, 2 episodes)
- 2009, 2015: Ein Fall für zwei (Television series, various roles, 2 episodes)
- 2009: The type, 13 children & me
- 2010: UFO
- 2010: Katie Fforde - Feast of the Day (TV series)
- 2010: All love
- 2010: Der letzte Bulle (TV Series, Episode One Star Over Essen)
- 2010: Use in Hamburg - Red as death (TV series)
- 2011: Der Kriminalist (TV series, episode Dierhagen's legacy)
- 2011: Nord Nord Mord (TV series)
- 2011: Inclusion – together different
- 2011–2012: KRIMI.DE (TV series, 2 episodes)
- 2012: Some Like It Happy
- 2012: A triplet rarely comes alone
- 2012: Johanna and the Bush Pilot - The way to Africa
- 2012: Johanna and the Bush Pilot - the legend of the cranes
- 2012: Desired child
- 2012, 2015: Stuttgart Homicide (TV series, various roles, 2 episodes)
- 2013: Bankless!
- 2014: Löwenzahn (TV series, episode Aftermath - The Great Lot)
- 2014: Richard Jury Mysteries: The Man with a Load of Mischief (TV series episode)
- 2014: Four triplets are one too much
- 2014: A sure-fire plan
- 2014: Separation in Italian
- 2015: Ein starkes Team - Best friends (TV series)
- 2015: Tatort - Borowski and the children of Gaarden
- 2015: Last track Berlin (TV series, episode succession state property)
- 2016: Marie Brand and the Shadows of the Past (TV series)
- 2016: The prosecutor (television series, episode successor heirs and dying)
- 2016: Heldt (TV series, episode Not to be pledged)
- 2016: Dr. Klein (TV series, episode family problems)
- 2017: Next to the track - Your will be done (TV series)
- 2017: Tatort - Neighbors
- 2017: Lotta & the seriousness of life
- 2018: Einmal Sohn, immer Sohn
- 2018: Our boys
- 2019: Wilsberg: Minus 196°
- 2020: Spring (TV Series)
- 2020: The Chancellery
- 2020: Die Chefin
- 2021: SOKO Potsdam

=== Short films ===
- 1999: Dolphins
- 2000: Forgotten Knights
- 2001: Imagine.
- 2001: Worm gap
- 2004: The anniversary
- 2005: Hamlet
- 2005: Blackout
- 2006: Townscape
- 2006: Memory Effect
- 2008: Clarification of facts
- 2009: Edgar
- 2011: Edeltraud and Theodor
- 2013: The Wizard
- 2013: Loona Balloona
