= Un prete tra noi =

Italian television series

- Genre: Drama
- Directed by: Giorgio Capitani
- Starring: Massimo Dapporto; Julia Brendler; Robert Iaboni; Giovanna Ralli; Riccardo Cucciolla; Paolo Lombardi; Gabriele Ferzetti; Michael Lonsdale; Luigi Montini; Carlo Croccolo; Mattia Sbragia; Rüdiger Vogler; Marina Tagliaferri; Alessio Boni; Pino Ammendola
- Country of origin: Italy
- No. of seasons: 2
- No. of episodes: 12

Production
- Running time: 100 minutes

Original release
- Network: Rai 2
- Release: October 28, 1997 – April 8, 1999

Un prete tra noi (English: A Priest Among Us)is an Italian drama television series. The series tells the story of Don Marco, a Catholic priest, who is assigned to a penitentiary as a chaplain.

== Cast ==
- Massimo Dapporto: Don Marco
- Julia Brendler: Maria
- Giovanna Ralli: Elisabetta
- Robert Iaboni: Picchio
- Riccardo Cucciolla: Don Clemente
- Gabriele Ferzetti: Ettore
- Michael Lonsdale: The Bishop
- Luigi Montini: Sandro Antonelli
- Carlo Croccolo: Paride Finizi
- Mattia Sbragia: Mattia Silvestri
- Rüdiger Vogler: Padre di Maria
- Marina Tagliaferri: Elene
- Alessio Boni: Gianni

== See also ==
- List of Italian television series
