= Peter Kremer =

German theatre and television actor (born 1958)

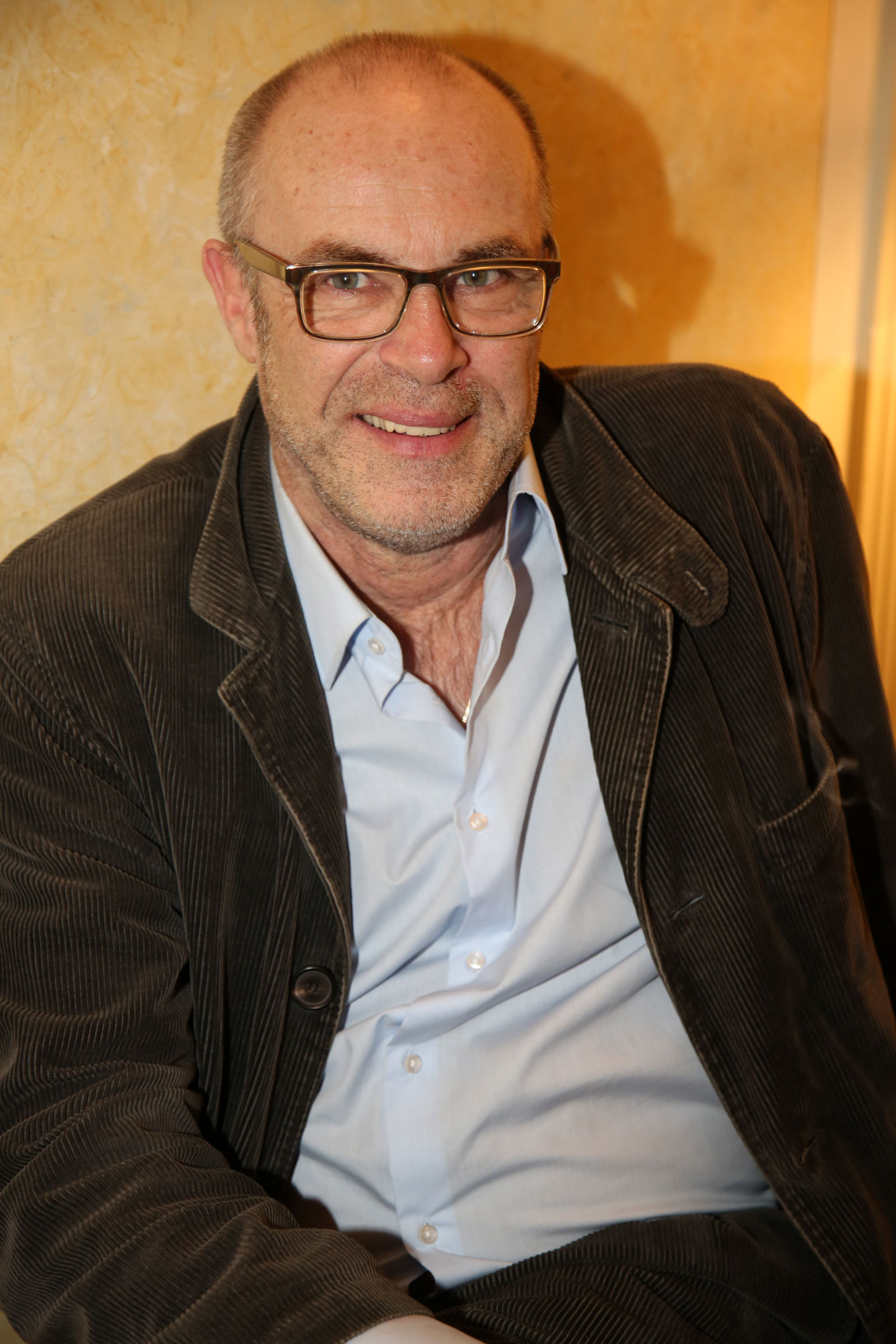
- Peter Kremer in 2015
- Born: 18 February 1958 (age 67); Brilon, Germany
- Occupation(s): Theatre and television actor
- Years active: 1981–present
- Website: www.abovetheline.de/klient.php?kliNa=kremer&kliKat=schauspieler

Peter Kremer (born 18 February 1958 in Brilon, North Rhine-Westphalia) is a German theatre and television actor.

== Filmography ==
Year	Title	Role	Notes
1987	Sansibar oder der letzte Grund	Gregor	
2005	Weiße Stille	Auerbach	
2012	Rommel	General Burgdorf	TV movie
