= Barfuß bis zum Hals =

2009 film

- Written by: Sarah Schnier
- Directed by: Hansjörg Thurn
- Starring: Martin Brambach; Stefanie Höner; Sarah Kim Gries; Christoph M. Ohrt
- Theme music composer: Kolja Erdmann
- Country of origin: Germany
- Original language: German

Production
- Producers: Ivo-Alexander Beck; Jochen Ketschau
- Cinematography: Marco Uggiano
- Editor: Achim Seidel

Original release
- Release: 2009

Barfuß bis zum Hals (English: Barefoot to the Neck) is a German comedy television film released in 2009.

== Plot ==
A nudist site in eastern Germany is sold to Dieter Lohe, a conservative textile manufacturer from Bavaria. He visits his new property with his daughter Natalie, and plans to use the property as a hunting ground. For fear of losing their tenancy agreement, the members of the association adjust to Lohe's presence by walking around dressed. Jakob Steiner, the son of the club's leader, doesn't accept the nudist family tradition and because of this argues with his father. Jacob becomes close friends with Lohe's daughter. Lohe eventually gets wise to the clothed nudists, and after a few complications all of the parties involved come to an arrangement.
