= The Audition (2019 film) =

2019 film

- Directed by: Ina Weisse
- Starring: Nina Hoss
- Cinematography: Judith Kaufmann
- Release date: 8 September 2019 (TIFF)
- Running time: 99 minutes
- Countries: Germany; France
- Language: German

The Audition (German: Das Vorspiel) is a 2019 German drama film directed by Ina Weisse.

== Plot ==
Music teacher Anna Bronsky (Nina Hoss) pushes her student Alexander Paraskevas relentlessly.

== Cast ==
- Nina Hoss - Anna Bronsky
- Ilja Monti - Alexander Paraskevas
- Simon Abkarian - Philippe Bronsky
- Jens Albinus - Christian Wels
- Sophie Rois - Frau Köhler
- Thomas Thieme - Walter

== Reception ==
On review aggregator website Rotten Tomatoes, the film holds an approval rating of 79% based on 39 reviews, with an average rating of 6.0/10.
