= Martin Brambach =

German actor (born 1967)

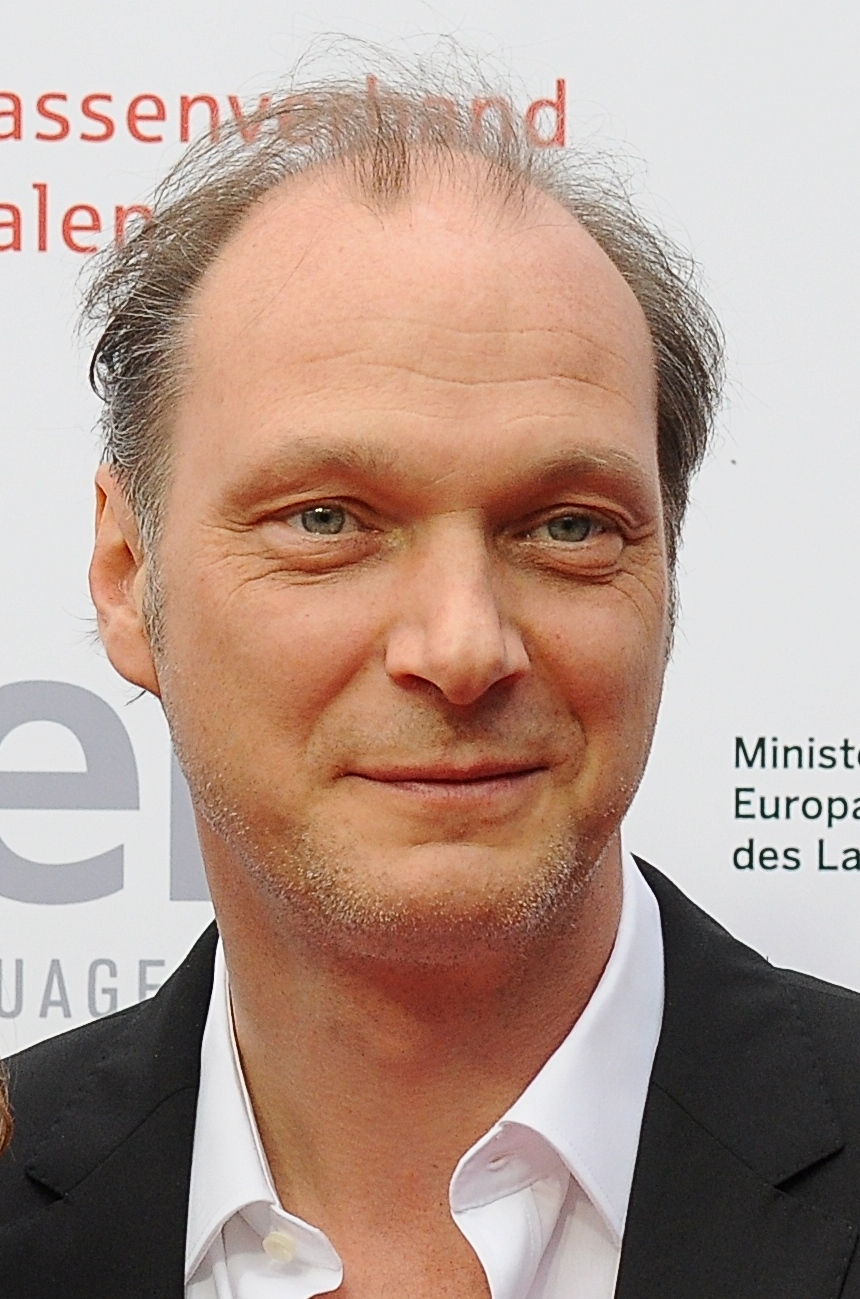
- Brambach at the Grimme-Preis 2014
- Born: 28 October 1967 (age 58); Dresden, East Germany
- Occupation: Actor
- Years active: 1986–present
- Spouse: Christine Sommer

Martin Brambach (born 28 October 1967) is a German actor. He grew up in Dresden, East Berlin and Hamburg. After attending Westfälische Schauspielschule drama school in Bochum, Brambach was engaged at Schauspielhaus Bochum, Schauspiel Köln, Burgtheater Vienna (company member from 1989 to 1999) and Schaubühne Berlin.

He appeared in more than one hundred films since 1988. He played minor roles in the Academy Award-winning films The Lives of Others, The Counterfeiters and The Reader, and worked with internationally known directors like Michael Haneke and Thomas Vinterberg.

Brambach lives in Recklinghausen with actress Christine Sommer, her daughters and their son. He is the step brother of Jan Josef Liefers.

== Filmography ==
- 1993: Das Geheimnis .... Walter Rosner
- 1997: Comedian Harmonists
- 1999: Kubanisch rauchen .... Polizist
- 1999: Girls Under Investigation
- 2002: Sophiiiie! .... Mann mit Toupet
- 2003: Ravioli .... Grocer
- 2003: Anatomie 2 .... Vorstopper
- 2003: Good Bye, Lenin .... Stasi 1
- 2003: Struggle .... Martin
- 2003: Adam & Eva .... Erik
- 2003: Böse Zellen .... Reini, Manu's brother
- 2003: MA 2412 - Die Staatsdiener
- 2004: About a Girl .... Igor
- 2005: The Clown: Payday .... Kähler
- 2006: Goldene Zeiten .... Hotelmanager
- 2006: Klimt .... Thomas
- 2006: The Lives of Others .... Einsatzleiter Meyer
- 2006: Where Is Fred? .... Johansen
- 2007: GG 19 – Eine Reise durch Deutschland in 19 Artikeln .... Scharrer (segment "Artikel 11")
- 2007: The Counterfeiters .... Hauptscharführer Holst
- 2007: Yella .... Dr. Fritz
- 2008: Krauts, Doubts & Rock 'n' Roll .... Gewehrverkäufer
- 2008: The Invention of Curried Sausage .... Gauredner
- 2008: North Face .... Redakteur Henze
- 2008: The Reader .... Remand Prison Guard #1
- 2009: Barfuß bis zum Hals .... Helmut Steiner
- 2009: Diamantenhochzeit .... Manfred
- 2009: Miss Stinnes Motors Round the World .... Journalist
- 2010: Tag und Nacht (Day and Night) .... Kai
- 2011: Avé .... Truck-driver
- 2011: 4 Days in May .... Oberleutnant Wendt
- 2012: A Coffee in Berlin .... Kontrolleur Jörg
- 2012: Nothing but Women .... Cornelius Berger
- 2013: Harms .... Timm
- 2013: The Almost Perfect Man .... Henssler
- 2014: Better Than Nothing .... Herr Hiller jr.
- 2014: Bhopal: A Prayer for Rain .... Ted
- 2016: Frauen .... Rüdiger Kneppke
- 2018: Kursk .... Captain Gennady Shirokov (Kursk)
- 2018: 25 km/h
- 2020: Lindenberg! Mach dein Ding .... Herm

Television

- 1988: Mother Courage and Her Children (TV Movie) .... Schweizerkas
- 1997: The Castle (TV Movie) .... Schwarzer
- 2004–2006: SOKO Wismar (TV Series) .... Kriminaloberkommissar Winfried 'Winnie' Scheel
- 2007–2010: KDD – Berlin Crime Squad .... Thomas Behrens
- 2012–2014: Add a Friend .... Dr. Metzler
- 1999–2020: Tatort .... Kommissariatsleiter Peter Michael Schnabel
- 2017: Schuld nach Ferdinand von Schirach (Guilt)
