= Christina Große =

German actress (born 1970)

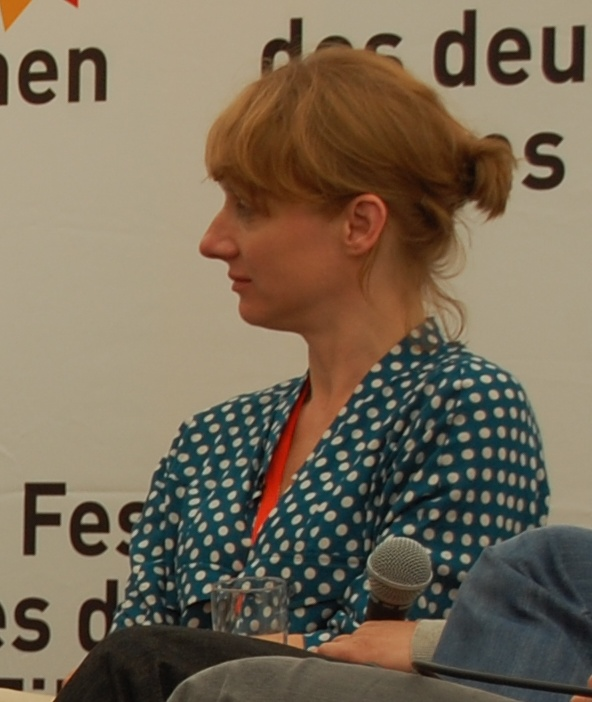
- Christina Große in 2012
- Born: 23 September 1970 (age 55); Blankenhain, East Germany
- Occupation: Actress
- Years active: 1995-present

Christina Große (born 23 September 1970) is a German actress. She has appeared in more than seventy films since 1995. In 2015, she was nominated for the Grimme Prize Special in the productions Neufeld, mitkommen! (WDR), Spreewald crime thriller: Mörderische Wärme (ZDF), Be my Baby (ZDF) and other productions from the 2014 broadcast year.

== Selected filmography ==
Film
Year	Title	Role	Notes
2025	Cicadas		It will be screened in Panorama at the 75th Berlin International Film Festival in February 2025.
2010	The Hairdresser	Silke	
2005	Netto		

TV
Year	Title	Role	Notes
2014	14 - Diaries of the Great War	Käthe Kollwitz	
2007	Der Kriminalist	Ellen Hansen	
