= Rebecca Immanuel =

German actress

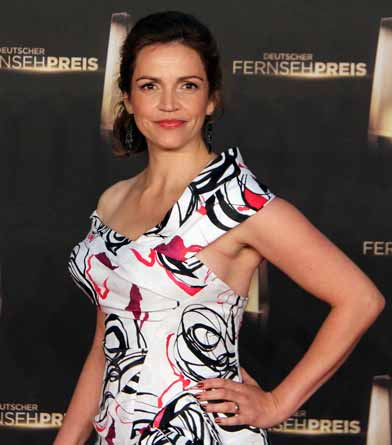
- Immanuel at the Deutscher Fernsehpreis 2012
- Born: 13 November 1970 (age 55); Oberhausen, North Rhine-Westphalia, Germany
- Occupation: Actress
- Children: 1

Rebecca Immanuel, born Sonja Zimmer (born 1970 in Oberhausen, North Rhine-Westphalia) is a German actress.

Immanuel is married and has a son.

== Filmography ==
=== Television roles ===
- Tatort (2011)
- Edel & Starck (2002-2005)
- Der Bergdoktor (2013- )
- Die Eifelpraxis (2016-2019)
