= Ina Weisse =

German actress, screenwriter and film director

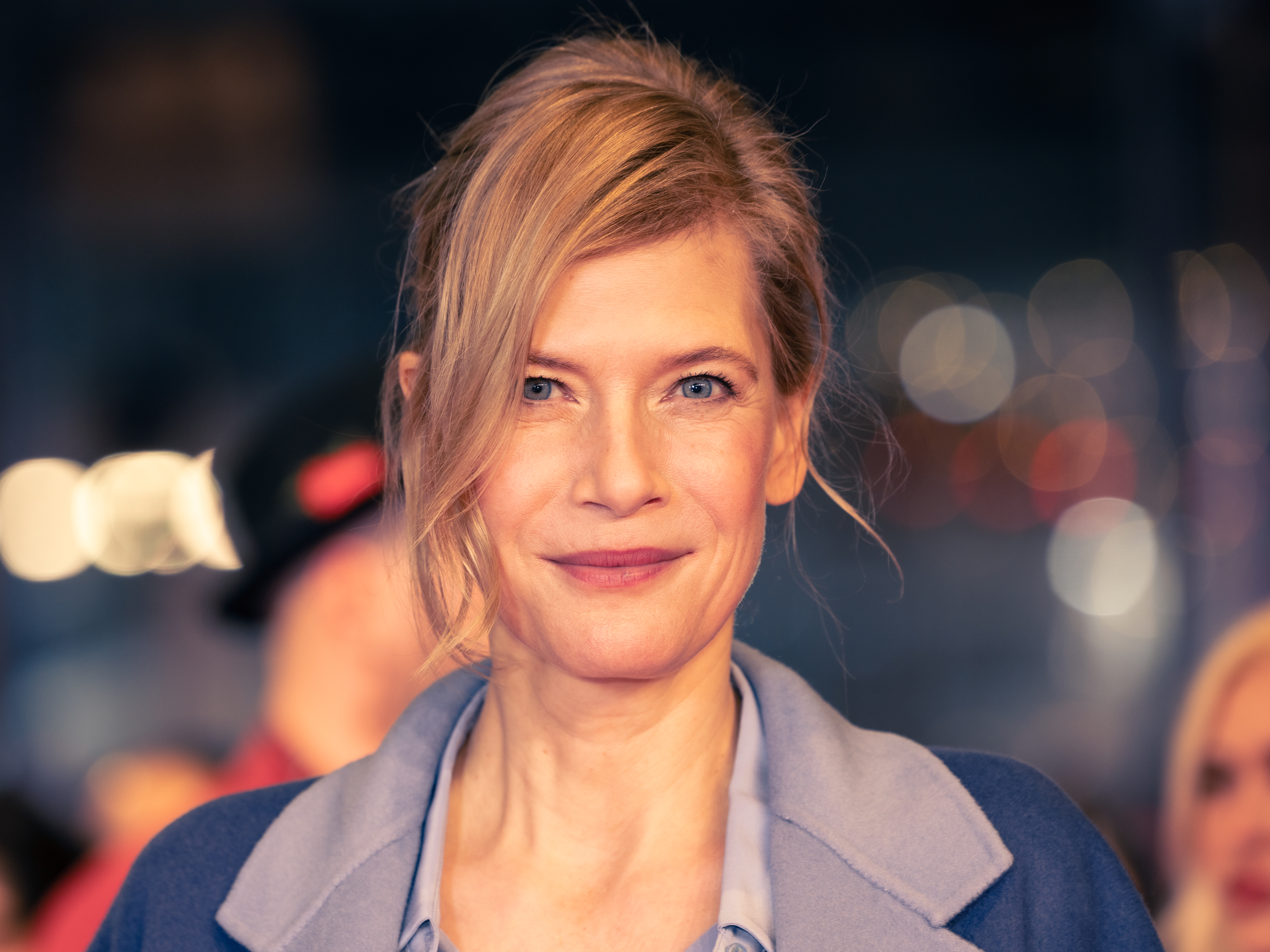
- Weisse in 2025
- Born: 12 June 1968 (age 57); West Berlin, West Germany
- Occupations: Actress; film director; screenwriter

Ina Weisse (born 12 June 1968) is a German actress, screenwriter and film director. She is especially well known for her roles as the distant and ambivalent blonde. She became apparent with roles in films like Tatort und Polizeiruf 110. She won several awards with her films, regarding acting and directing films in Germany. Even though that the movies she directed have been successful, she is still better known as an actress than as a director. Her most famous film, which she directed is The Architect.

== Life and education ==
Ina Weisse was born on 12 June 1968 in West Berlin and is the daughter of a respected architect and an art mistress, which influenced her very early to choose an artistic life journey. But it was her uncle, who introduced her to the theater, as he took her to the Berliner Schaubühne.

After she finished her degree at the acting school Otto-Falckenberg-Schule in Munich, received Ina Weisse her first engagement at the National Theatre Mannheim. Afterwards she started to study philosophy in Heidelberg in 1992. In 2002 she finished her second degree at the University of Hamburg, where she studied film direction and production by Hark Bohm. Her graduation movie Alles anders was honored with the First Steps Award First Steps Award.

Ina Weisse is married to the German Film director Matti Geschonneck, with whom she worked together for the TV-films Duell in der Nacht (2007), Tod in Istanbul (2009), Der Verdacht (2010) und Das Ende einer Nacht (2011).

== Career ==
Her first theater debut was with the comedy movie called Echte Kerle (1996). Henceforth she was seen in many TV- productions and several times in the German crime series Tatort. Weisse started in 2001 with making short movies, which have been successful and can be seen as her start for TV productions. The Architect (2008) was her debut as a film director, for which she had been writing the script together with Daphne Charizani. Matthias Schweighöfer, Josef Bierbichler and Sandra Hüller, famous German actors, played the main roles in the drama. The movie was screened at the Berlinale and Max-Ophüls-Filmfestival in 2009 and was priced for the best screenplay. The film critic Stefanie Rufle wrote: ”It's a mature direction debut, which Ina Weisse handled stabile and confident".

== Filmography ==
=== As actress ===
Year	Title	Notes
1994	Verliebt, verlobt, verheiratet (In Love, Engaged, Married)	TV series
1995	Brüder auf Leben und Tod (Brothers in Life and Death)	TV film
1996	Regular Guys	
1996	Tatort – Heilig Blut (Tatort - Holy Blood)	TV series
1997	Ein Vater unter Verdacht (Suspicious father)	TV film
1997	Trügerische Nähe (Illusive Closeness)	TV film
1997	Die Sexfalle (Honeytrap)	TV film
1997	Weihnachten mit Willy Wuff – Mama braucht einen Millionär (Christmas with Willy Wuff - Mother needs a Millionaire)	TV film
1998	Single sucht Nachwuchs (Single on the Look for Offspring)	TV film
1998	Der dreckige Tod (Dirty Death)	TV film
1999	Das Verflixte Babyjahr – Nie wieder Sex?! (The Tricky Maternity Year - Never Sex Again?)	TV film
2000	Liebestod (Love Death)	TV film
2002	Zwei Affären und eine Hochzeit (Two Affairs and One Wedding)	TV film
2002	Der Elefant – Mord verjährt nie (Unsolved)	TV film
2003	Ausgeliefert (Delivered)	TV film
2003	Katzenzungen (Cats' Tongues)	TV film
2003	Sams in Gefahr (Sams in Danger)	
2005	Die Patriarchin (Paternalist)	TV miniseries
2005	Schneeland (Land of Snow)	
2005	Der Ermittler (Investigator)	TV series, one episode
2005	Kanzleramt (Chancellery)	TV series, one episode
2006	Blackout – Die Erinnerung ist tödlich (Blackout - The Memory is Deadly)	TV series, four episodes
2006	Nichts als Gespenster (Nothing but Ghosts)	
2007	Im Namen des Gesetzes – Tote auf Urlaub (In the Name of Justice - Death on Vacation)	TV series
2007	Duell in der Nacht (Duel at Night)	TV film
2007	Tatort – Bevor es dunkel wird (Tatort - Before It Gets Dark)	TV series
2007	Doktor Martin	TV series
2008	Mutig in die neuen Zeiten – Alles anders (Brave into the New Time - Everything Changes)	TV film
2008	Die Weisheit der Wolken (The Wisdom of the Clouds)	TV film
2009	Polizeiruf 110 – Falscher Vater (Wrong Father)	
2009	Tatort – Schiffe versenken (Tatort - Sinking Ships)	
2010	Tod in Istanbul (Death in Istanbul)	TV film
2010	Im Dschungel (In the Jungle)	TV film
2010	Amigo	TV film
2011	Der Verdacht (Suspicion)	TV film
2012	Mord in Ludwigslust (Murder in Ludwigslust)	TV film
2012	Das Ende einer Nacht (The End of a Night)	TV film
2012	Der Teufel von Mailand (The Devil from Milan)	TV film
2012	Tatort – Dinge, die noch zu tun sind (Tatort - Things Which are Still to Do)	
2013	Tod an der Ostsee (Death at the Baltic Sea)	TV film
2014	Die Flut ist pünktlich (High Tide Is Dead on Time)	TV film
2014	Ich will dich (Unexpected)	TV film
2015	Village of Silence	TV film
2015	A Grand Farewell	TV film
2018	Never Look Away	

=== As director ===
Year	Title	Notes
1999	Lünow	Short film
2001	Sonntags	Short film
2002	Alles anders	Short film
2004	Klara	Short film
2008	The Architect	
2017	Die neue Nationalgalerie	Documentary
2019	The Audition	Feature film
2025	Cicadas	Feature film

== Awards ==
Year	Association	Category
2002	First Steps Award	Regie for Alles anders
2002	Studio Hamburg Junior Award	Regie for Alles anders
2008	German Television Award	Minor Part for Duell in der Nacht
2009	Max Ophüls Award	Best Skript for The Architect
2012	German Television Award	Best actress in Das Ende einer Nacht
2012	Actor Award of Günter-Rohrbach	Role in Das Ende einer Nacht
2013	Grimme- Price	Role in Das Ende einer Nacht
2013	Nomination for the Golden Camera	Best Actress for Das Ende einer Nacht 2015 Preis der deutschen Fernsehakademie. Best actress for "ich will dich" 2016 German television award. Best actress for " Der große Aufbruch" und " Ich will dich"
