= Tanya Landman =

English author (born 1950)

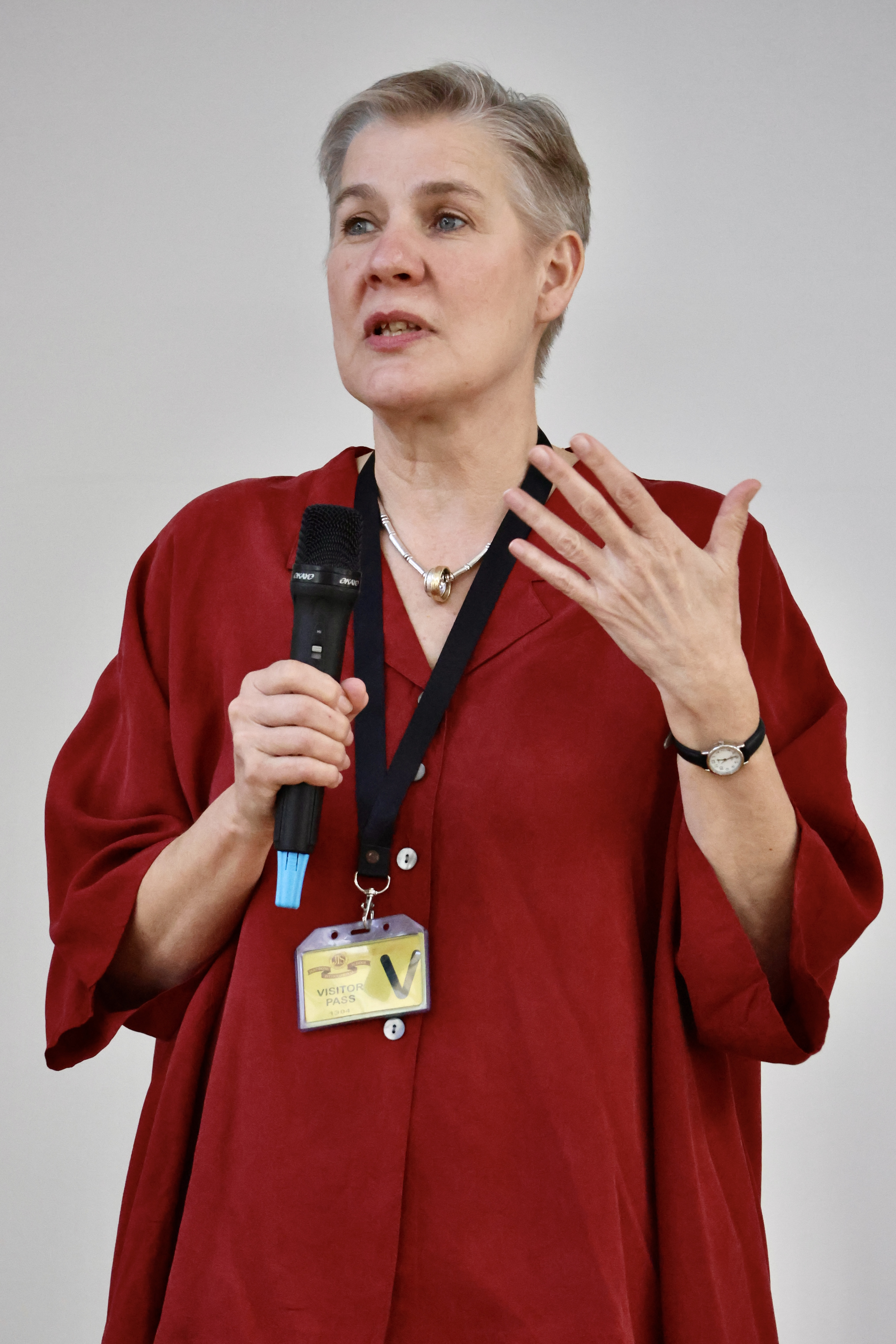
- Tanya in 2024
- Born: Gravesend, Kent, United Kingdom
- Education: University of Liverpool
- Occupation: Writer
- Spouse: Rod Burnett
- Relatives: Robert Shaw (uncle); Ian Shaw (cousin); Penelope Shaw Sylvester (cousin)
- Writing career
- Notable awards: Carnegie Medal; Spur Award
- Website: tanyalandman.com

Tanya Landman is an English author of children's and young adult books. She is the niece of the actor Robert Shaw.

== Early life and education ==
Tanya continued on to study English literature at Liverpool University, after which she held jobs at a zoo, an arts center, and a children's bookshop. She worked at Storybox Theatre as a performer, administrator, and writer. She has been a member of Storybox Theatre since 1992, serving in various capacities such as writer, administrator, and performer.

== Career ==
Tanya was a fan of Penelope Lively's novels in which the past seeps into the present, most hauntingly in Astercote and The House in Norham Gardens but to great humorous effect in The Ghost of Thomas Kempe.

Before the inspiration for Waking Merlin struck, Tanya had no intention of becoming a writer. "Adventure stories with a sprinkle of magic and spoonful of humour" characterised her early works. However, Tanya then changed her focus to crime, penning Mondays are Murder, the first of 10 "Agatha-Christies-for-kids." She writes for a wide age range of readers, but her young adult historical thrillers are arguably her most well-known works.

North Devon's striking coastline served as inspiration for both the historical thriller Hell and High Water and her Flotsam & Jetsam trilogy.

== Personal life ==
Tanya grew up in Gravesend, Kent after being born there. Up until she was approximately fourteen, people thought she was a boy (maybe because of her short hair and persistently rough knees). With her husband, Rod Burnett, two boys, Isaac and Jack, a Siamese cat, and two Labradors, she currently resides in North Devon. She leaves at regular times to visit schools around the nation and around the world.

== Awards ==
Tanya won the 2015 CILIP Carnegie Medal for her novel Buffalo Soldier. She also won a Western Writers of America 2009 Spur Award for her novel I Am Apache.

Her work has also been shortlisted for numerous other awards: the 2008 Booktrust Teenage Prize for Apache; the 2010 Bolton Children's Book Award and 2010 Red House Children's Book Award for Mondays are Murder; and the 2008 Guardian Children's Fiction Prize for The Goldsmith's Daughter.
