= Penelope Shaw Sylvester =

American sound editor

- Occupation: film editor
- Years active: 1978-1990
- Spouse: Donald Sylvester
- Parent: Robert Shaw
- Relatives: Ian Shaw (half-brother); Tanya Landman (cousin)

Penelope Shaw Sylvester is an American film editor. She worked with director Michael Cimino on the Academy award winning film The Deer Hunter.

== Career ==
Sylvester is credited as assistant editor under the name 'Penelope Shaw' on the 1978 film The Deer Hunter. Working with Michael Cimino and Peter Zinner, she spent about 100 hours collating six hundred thousand feet of film, during a time before digital editing when film was cut and spliced together. Zinner received an Academy Award for Best Film Editing, an American Cinema Editors Award for Best Edited Feature Film and a British Academy Film Award for Best Editing.

Sylvester is also credited as an assistant editor under the name Penelope Shaw on the 1980 film Heaven's Gate, 1984 David Lynch film Dune and on the 1985 Richard Fleischer film Red Sonja.

== Personal life ==
Sylvester is a daughter of actor Robert Shaw and his third wife Jennifer Bourke.

Sylvester is married to Donald Sylvester, a film and sound editor, who she encouraged to pursue a career in film after his time working in the music industry and in entertainment law. They have a son, Peter and a daughter Louise.
