= Allein unter Bauern =

- Also known as: Alone Among Farmers
- Starring: Christoph M. Ohrt
- Country of origin: Germany

Allein unter Bauern (Alone Among Farmers) was a German comedy television series, commissioned by Sat.1 and produced by Phoenix. It aired for ten episodes between 2006 and 2007 and was cancelled on 4 May 2007.

== See also ==
- List of German television series
