= Christoph M. Ohrt =

German film and television actor (born 1960)

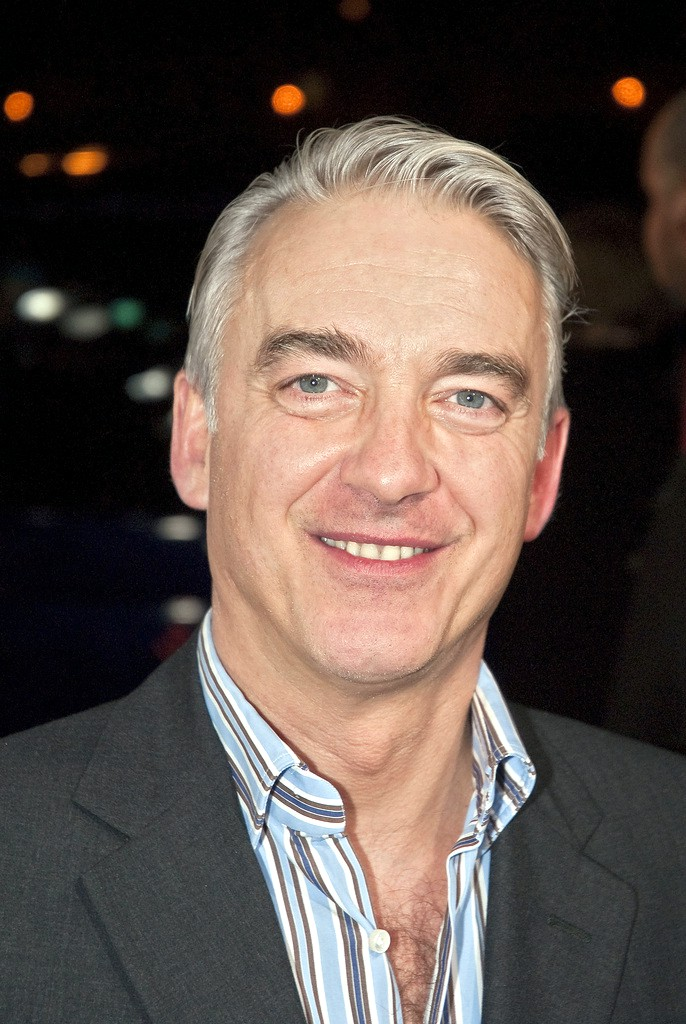
- Ohrt at the 2008 Berlinale
- Born: Christoph Marius Ohrt; 30 March 1960 (age 66); Hamburg, West Germany
- Occupation: Actor
- Years active: 1980–present
- Spouse: Stevee Ohrt

Christoph M. Ohrt (born 30 March 1960, in Hamburg) is a German film and television actor. One of his best known roles was the portrayal of Felix Edel on the German television series Edel & Starck

== Biography ==
Ohrt grew up in Hamburg and attended the Gymnasium Eppendorf, a high school, which he left a few years before his graduation to study at a drama school. He later continued his drama studies at the Center for the Acting Process in the U.S. The film Banks and Robbers (1983) marks his start in cinema activity in Germany. In 2002 he started to portray Felix Edel on the TV series Edel & Starck receiving the Deutscher Fernsehpreis in the same year.

He met his wife Stevee in Sherman Oaks a district of Los Angeles. They have two children, a daughter and a son.

== Filmography ==
=== Film ===
Year	Film	Role	Notes
1980	The World That Summer	Dorn	
1981	Familientag		short
1983	Banks and Robbers	Erich Bauermann	
1985	What to Do with Willfried?	Walker	
1986	Then Nothing Is the Same Anymore	Bernie	
1990	Die Richterin		
1995	Over My Dead Body	Fred Wischnewski	
1995	Talk of the Town		(uncredited)
1996	Dangerous Dowry	Andi	
1996	Regular Guys	Christoph Schwenk	
1997	Service	Herr Maier	
1997	Ballermann 6	Klaus	
1999	Snow on New Year's Eve	Alexander Meyer	
2001	Executive Protection	Nikolaus Lehman	
2002	Feuer, Eis & Dosenbier	Tronald Dump	
2002	Am Ende der Nacht	Emil	
2009	Barfuß bis zum Hals	Dieter Lohe	
2014	Reach Me	Tommy	

=== Television ===
Year	Programme or series	Role	Notes
1983	Dingo	Walter Neumann	
1984	The Million Dollar Hijack		TV mini-series
1984–1997	Tatort	Kriminalassistent Klosey; Markus Joest; Cornelius Reusch	4 episodes
1984–2009	Ein Fall für zwei	Herbert Noss, various other roles	6 episodes
1985	45 Fieber – Die Vier aus der Zwischenzeit	Dion	(unknown episodes)
1986	Die Stadtpiraten	Charly	as Christoph Ohrt
1986	Berliner Weiße mit Schuß	Ludwig Melcher	Episode: "Der Babysitter/Gute Fahrt/Ein echter Tierfreund/Die Frau seiner Träume"
1987–1996	Auf Achse	Von Hofmeister	4 episodes
1988	A Father's Revenge	Wolfgang Donner	with Brian Dennehy and Ron Silver
1988	Spielergeschichten		
1989–1992	Das Nest	Theo Augustin	52 episodes
1989	The Saint: Wrong Number	Lang	
1991	Komissar Klefisch	Zilikens	Episode: "Dienstvergehen"
1991	Leo und Charlotte	Ehmo	
1992	Eurocops	Graf; Malzer	Episodes: "Doppelleben", "Das Omega Programm"
1992	Haus am See		
1992	Highlander	Walter Reinhardt	Episode: "Revenge Is Sweet"
1993	Eden	Ian	with Barbara Alyn Woods
1993	Glückliche Reise	Jan Fischer	Episode: "Ibiza"
1993	Remember	Walter	with Donna Mills and Stephen Collins
1994	Faust		Episode: "Der Beschützer"
1994	Jacob	Be'or	as Christoph Ohrt
1995	The Whipping Boy	Ambassador	based on the eponymous novel
1995	Wilkommen in Babylon	Rainer Zeissler	
1995	Zwei Brüder		Episode: "Die lange Nacht"
1996	Rivalen am Abgrund	Philipp Gabert	
1996	Die Kommissarin	Thomas Kleim	Episode: "Banküberfall"
1996	Die Drei		Episode: "Das Ende eines Killers"
1997	Geisterstunde – Fahrstuhl ins Jenseits		
1997	The Lost Daughter	Bernard Sicard	with Richard Chamberlain
1997	Appartement für einen Selbstmörder	Robert Mertens	
1997	Doppelter Einsatz	Manfred Ölschläger	Episode: "Der Mörder mit der Maske"
1998–2000	HeliCops – Einsatz über Berlin	Karl "Charly" von Schumann	Episodes: "Feuertaufe für AK1", "Das Gold der Kleopatra"
1999	My Wife Loves Two	Martin	
1999	Biikenbrennen – Der Fluch des Meeres	Marc Fölster	
2000	Mask of Death	Martin	
2001	Jagd auf den Plastiktüten-Mörder	Martin Lund	
2001	Klassentreffen – Mordfall unter Freunden	Rainer	
2001	Der Mann, den sie nicht lieben durfte	Dennis	
2001	Im Fadenkreuz	Richard Boger	Episode: "Das Chamäleon"
2002–2005	Edel & Starck	Felix Edel	52 episodes German Television Award for Best Actor in a TV Series (2002); Bavarian TV Award shared with Rebecca Immanuel (2003); Nominated-German Television Award for Best Actor in a TV Series (2003)
2004	Ein Mann für den 13ten		
2004	Mogelpackung Mann	Jo Held	
2006	Der letzte Zeuge	Michael Elsner	Episode: "Das rosa Lächeln"
2006	Pirate Vacation	Christian Vesens	
2007	Allein unter Bauern	Johannes Waller	10 episodes
2007	Wiedersehen in Verona	Robert Donatius	
2007	Ein Teufel für Familie Engel	Lou/Luzifer 2	
2007	Die ProSieben Märchenstunde	King	Episode: "König Drosselbart – Der Schöne und das Biest"
2007	Stolberg	Manfred Herwig	Episode: "Gekauftes Glück"
2008	Freundschaften und andere Neurosen	Roland Prinz	
2008	Zwillingsküsse schmecken besser	Maximilian von Falkenbach/Lukas Kunze	
2008	Die Schnüfflerin – Peggy kann's nicht lassen	Oskar Hohenstein	
2008	Immer Wirbel um Marie	Klaus Sandmann	
2008	Liebe im Halteverbot	Otto Schlegel	
2008	Brüderchen und Schwesterchen	Father	
2008	Dell & Richthoven	Bruno Dell	4 episodes
2009	Liebe in anderen Umständen	Richard Hauswald	
2010	Unter den Hügeln von Wales	Michael Loyd Glynn	
2011	The Seduction: The Strange Girl	Markus Schuster	
2011	Born to Dance	Dr. Michael Castell	
