= Regular Guys =

1996 film

- Directed by: Rolf Silber
- Starring: Christoph M. Ohrt; Carin C. Tietze
- Distributed by: Buena Vista International
- Release date: 30 May 1996
- Running time: 102 minutes
- Country: Germany
- Language: German
- Box office: 1,164,594 admissions (Germany)

Regular Guys (German: Echte Kerle) is a 1996 German comedy film directed by Rolf Silber.

== Cast ==
- Christoph M. Ohrt as Christoph Schwenk
- Carin C. Tietze as Helen
- Tim Bergmann as Edgar
- Oliver Stokowski as Mike
- Rudolf Kowalski as Kallenbach
- Dieter Brandecker as Deichsel
- Daniela Ziegler as Iris
- Ina Weisse as Karin
- Andreas Pietschmann as Marco
