= Deeply =

- Original DVD cover
- Directed by: Sheri Elwood
- Written by: Sheri Elwood
- Produced by: Karen Arikian; Carolynne Bell; Executive producer: Bess Fotopoulos; John Hamilton; Wolfram Tichy
- Starring: Julia Brendler; Kirsten Dunst; Lynn Redgrave
- Cinematography: Sebastian Edschmid
- Edited by: Jon Gregory
- Music by: Micki Meuser
- Distributed by: Myriad Pictures
- Release date: September 11, 2000
- Running time: 101 minutes
- Country: Canada
- Language: English

Deeply is a 2000 film directed by Sheri Elwood, starring Julia Brendler, Lynn Redgrave and Kirsten Dunst.

== Plot ==
Having suffered the death of her boyfriend, Claire McKay is brought by her mother to Ironbound Island in the hopes that time away from the city will allow her to recover emotionally. On the island where her mother was born, Claire meets an eccentric writer, Celia, who in flashbacks, relates her own story as a grief-stricken teenager in 1949. Celia—Silly in the flashbacks—is the next chosen victim of a Viking curse which was placed on the island centuries ago when their longship sank in the bay.

The nature of the curse is such that a "chosen one" is born every fifty years, and they are destined to die at sea in order for the fish the island depends on to continue to return. During the flashbacks Silly discovers a list of past victims, and that she is the next. However, in the end Silly is not claimed by the sea, which instead takes her lover. The narrator says something to the effect of what better alternative to taking the chosen one than to take her lover instead, leaving her to bear the pain. As Celia tells her own story of love and loss, Claire eventually undergoes a catharsis and again plays the violin that she has not touched since her own loss. The final images of the movie show a shoal of fish, which points to the fact that the fish do indeed return to the island.

== Cast ==
- Julia Brendler as Claire McKay
- Lynn Redgrave as Celia
- Kirsten Dunst as Silly
- Molly Dunsworth as Silly (Age 6)
- Trent Ford as James
- Brent Carver as Porter
- Alberta Watson as Fiona McKay
- Peter Donaldson as Dr. Stone
- Daniel Brühl as Jay
- Mark Day as Tough Hal

== Production ==
The film was shot on East Ironbound island, Nova Scotia. It was a Canadian-German co-production.

== Reception ==
Katrina Onstad, writing in the National Post, thought that while the film often "moves too slowly" and was too unaffected, it was "impressive is its fearlessness".
