= Donald Sylvester =

American sound editor

- Born: Moorestown, New Jersey, U.S.
- Occupation: Sound editor
- Years active: 1991–present
- Spouse: Penelope Shaw Sylvester

Awards and nominations
Award	Wins	Nominations
Academy Awards	1	2
BAFTA Awards	1	2
Satellite Awards	1	1
Golden Reel Awards	1	8
Hollywood Film Awards	1	1

Donald Sylvester is an American sound editor. He is best known for his work with James Mangold on the films A Complete Unknown, Ford v Ferrari, Logan, 3:10 to Yuma, and Walk the Line. Sylvester won the Academy Award for Best Sound Editing at the 92nd Academy Awards for Ford v Ferrari and BAFTA Award for Best Sound at the 59th British Academy Film Awards for Walk the Line.

== Early life and education ==
Don Sylvester was born in Georgia to Louis E. Sylvester and his wife Doris. He grew up in DeKalb County, Georgia where he attended Lakeside High School. Sylvester attended Grady College of Journalism, University of Georgia, graduating in 1975. While in college, he was an originator of and worked as a DJ at the university radio station WUOG.

== Career ==
Sylvester began his career working at WAGA-TV Fox 5 news station in Atlanta. He has been a member of BAFTA since 2007. He has worked on over 100 films.

== Personal life ==
Sylvester is married to Penelope Shaw Sylvester (Penny), a film editor, who encouraged him to pursue a career in film, after having begun in the music industry and entertainment law. They have a son and a daughter.

== Awards and nominations ==
=== Academy Awards ===
Year	Nominated work	Category	Result	Notes
2020	Ford v Ferrari	Best Sound Editing	Won	
2025	A Complete Unknown	Best Sound	Nominated	

=== BAFTA Awards ===
Year	Nominated work	Category	Result	Notes
2006	Walk the Line	Best Sound	Won	
2020	Ford v Ferrari	Best Sound	Nominated	

=== Golden Reel Awards ===
Year	Nominated work	Category	Result	Notes
2001	U-571	Outstanding Achievement in Sound Editing – Sound Effects and Foley for Feature Film	Nominated	
2003	Antwone Fisher	Outstanding Achievement in Sound Editing – Dialogue and ADR for Feature Film	Nominated	
2004	X2: X-Men United	Outstanding Achievement in Sound Editing – Dialogue and ADR for Feature Film	Nominated	
2004	Master and Commander: The Far Side of the World	Outstanding Achievement in Sound Editing – Dialogue and ADR for Feature Film	Nominated	
2008	3:10 to Yuma	Outstanding Achievement in Sound Editing – Sound Effects and Foley for Feature Film	Nominated	
2018	Logan	Outstanding Achievement in Sound Editing – Sound Effects and Foley for Feature Film	Nominated	
2020	Ford v Ferrari	Outstanding Achievement in Sound Editing – Sound Effects and Foley for Feature Film	Won	
2020	Ford v Ferrari	Outstanding Achievement in Sound Editing – Dialogue and ADR for Feature Film	Nominated	

=== Satellite Awards ===
Year	Nominated work	Category	Result	Notes
2020	Ford v Ferrari	Best Sound	Won	

=== Hollywood Film Awards ===
Year	Nominated work	Category	Result	Notes
2019	Ford v Ferrari	Sound of the Year	Won	
