= Ian Shaw (actor) =

English actor

- Born: 18 December 1969 (age 56); London, England
- Occupation: Actor
- Years active: 1993–present
- Parents: Robert Shaw (father); Mary Ure (mother)
- Relatives: Tanya Landman (cousin); Penelope Shaw Sylvester (half-sister)

Ian Shaw (born 18 December 1969) is an English stage and screen actor. He is the son of actress Mary Ure and actor Robert Shaw.

== Career ==
After studying American Studies at Sussex University, Shaw trained as an actor at the Webber Douglas Academy of Dramatic Art.

On stage, Shaw played Friedrich in War Horse (National Theatre) and also appeared in several plays in Rep at the Royal Exchange Manchester (Widowers' Houses, The Importance of Being Earnest, Nude With Violin, The Philadelphia Story, The Brothers Karamazov). He was also in Much Ado About Nothing (West End), Three Sisters (Nuffield/Bath), Private Lives and Closer (Birmingham Rep), and The Rivals (Derby Playhouse & Philadelphia Walnut St).

His first television role was in 1993 in an episode of Casualty. Since then he has appeared in the films Century (1993), Moondance (1995), The Boys From County Clare (2003), The Contract (2006), and Johnny English Reborn (2011). He has also appeared in many TV series including EastEnders, Soldier, Soldier, The Bill, The Queen, Sharpe, Ultimate Force, Ghosts, Silent Witness, and Medics.

=== The Shark Is Broken ===
Shaw is the co-author, with Joseph Nixon, of The Shark Is Broken, a play about the making of Jaws in which he plays his father. The play, directed by Guy Masterson, was the hit of the 2019 Edinburgh Fringe, selling out its run and receiving glowing reviews, several saying, "They're going to need a bigger theatre." The play was due to re-open at the Ambassadors Theatre in London on 11 May 2020, produced by Sonia Friedman, with Ian as Robert Shaw, Demetri Goritsas as Roy Scheider and Liam Murray Scott as Richard Dreyfuss. The COVID-19 pandemic forced Britain's theatres to close in March 2020 and the production was halted. The play re-opened in October 2021.

Jessie Thomson, reviewing the London production in the Evening Standard, wrote that Shaw "gives what is undoubtedly one of the best theatrical performances of the year. Flitting between machismo and vulnerability, he delivers a hilarious and moving performance that's exhilarating to watch, in a show that begins as a rollicking comedy before turning into something deeper."

== Selected filmography ==
- Sharpe's Gold (1995) (TV film)
- Blood and Water (1995) (TV film)
- Moondance (1995) (Film)
- Wuthering Heights (1998) (TV film)
- Hiroshima: BBC History of World War II (2005) (TV film)
