= Cicadas (2025 film) =

2025 drama film by Ina Weisse

- Festival release poster
- German: Zikaden
- Directed by: Ina Weisse
- Screenplay by: Ina Weisse
- Produced by: Felix von Boehm
- Starring: Nina Hoss; Saskia Rosendahl; Vincent Macaigne
- Cinematography: Judith Kaufmann
- Edited by: Hansjörg Weißbrich
- Music by: Annette Focks
- Production companies: Lupa Film GmbH; 10:15! Productions (Paris)
- Distributed by: DCM Film Distribution; Beta Cinema
- Release dates: 15 February 2025 (Berlinale); 19 June 2025 (Theaters)
- Running time: 100 minutes
- Countries: Germany; France
- Language: German

Cicadas (German: Zikaden) is a 2025 German drama film written and directed by Ina Weisse. The film follows friendship between two dissimilar women: single mother Anja, who tries to keep herself and her daughter afloat with various jobs, and Isabell, who takes care of her parents in need of care and whose relationship with her husband Philipp is put to the test.

The film selected in Panorama 2025 had its premiere at the 75th Berlin International Film Festival on 15 February 2025. It is expected to release in theaters on 19 June 2025.

== Synopsis ==
Isabell's life is thrown into turmoil as she juggles caring for her aging parents, marital troubles with Philippe, and frequent trips between Berlin and their modernist retreat. There, she bonds unexpectedly with Anja, a struggling single mother. As Anja and her daughter Greta become part of her life, Isabell begins to question her carefully maintained stability, feeling an increasing loss of control.

== Cast ==
- Nina Hoss as Isabell
- Saskia Rosendahl as Anja
- Vincent Macaigne as Philipp
- Thorsten Merten
- Christina Große
- Alexander Hörbe
- Bettina Lamprecht
- Inge Weisse
- Rolf Weisse
- Robert Mika
- Mark Zak
- Yvon Moltzen
- Camille Moltzen as Valentin
- Uwe Preuss as Karsten

== Production ==
Principal photography began on 13 August 2024 on locations in Germany - Berlin and Brandenburg. Filming ended on 26 September 2024.

== Release ==
Cicadas had its World premiere in the Panorama section of the 75th Berlin International Film Festival on 15 February 2025.

In January 2025, Germany-based Beta Cinema acquired the international sales rights of the film. DCM plans to release the film in German-speaking territories in summer 2025.

It was released in German theaters on 19 June 2025.

It was also screened in International Perspective at the São Paulo International Film Festival on 20 October 2025.

== Accolades ==
Award	Date	Category	Recipient	Result	Ref.
Berlin International Film Festival	23 February 2025	Panorama Audience Award for Best Feature Film	Ina Weisse	Nominated	
