= Rommel (film) =

2012 film

- Written by: Niki Stein (as Nikolaus Stein von Kamienski)
- Directed by: Niki Stein (as Nikolaus Stein von Kamienski)
- Starring: Ulrich Tukur; Tim Bergmann
- Music by: Jacki Englke; Ulrich Spies
- Countries of origin: Germany; France; Austria
- Original languages: German, French, English

Production
- Producers: Nico Hofmann; Arianne Krampe; Jürgen Schuster (for Teamworx); Sascha Schwingel
- Cinematography: Arthur W. Ahrweiler
- Running time: 120 minutes

Original release
- Release: 1 November 2012

Rommel is a 2012 German television film first shown on Das Erste. It is a dramatisation of the last days of German general Erwin Rommel.

== Plot ==
This made-for-TV-movie starts on the last day (October 14, 1944) of Rommel's life with a talk between him and generals Wilhelm Burgdorf and Ernst Maisel. In this talk the generals present incriminating material. They say Rommel has the choice between suicide and a trial before the Volksgerichtshof. After this scene the last months of his life from March 1944 are presented chronologically. At this time Rommel is responsible for the Atlantikwall built to prevent an invasion by the allied forces.

== Cast ==
- Ulrich Tukur as Generalfeldmarschall Erwin Rommel
- Tim Bergmann as Oberstleutnant Caesar von Hofacker
- Rolf Kanies as Oberst Eberhard Finckh
- Patrick Mölleken as Manfred Rommel
- Hanns Zischler as Generalfeldmarschall Gerd von Rundstedt
- Klaus J. Behrendt as Generaloberst Heinz Guderian
- Benjamin Sadler as Generalleutnant Dr. Hans Speidel
- Aglaia Szyszkowitz as Lucie-Maria Rommel
- Robert Schupp as Hauptmann Hermann Aldinger
- Peter Wolf as SS-Obergruppenführer Ernst Kaltenbrunner
- Hubertus Hartmann as General der Infanterie Carl-Heinrich von Stülpnagel
- Vicky Krieps as Comtesse La Rochefoucauld
- Michael Kranz as Feldwebel Karl Daniel (Rommel's driver)
- Johannes Silberschneider as Adolf Hitler
- Oliver Nägele as General der Infanterie Günther Blumentritt
- Hary Prinz as General der Panzertruppe Leo Geyr Von Schweppenburg
- Hans Kremer as General der Artillerie Erich Marcks
- Peter Kremer as General der Infanterie Wilhelm Burgdorf
- Thomas Thieme as Generalfeldmarschall Günther von Kluge
- Max von Pufendorf as Generalmajor Hans-Georg von Tempelhoff
- Herbert Forthuber as Generalleutnant Hans von Boineburg-Lengsfeld
- Joe Bausch as Generalfeldmarschall Wilhelm Keitel (uncredited)
- Ralf Dittrich as Generalfeldmarschall Walter Model (uncredited)
- Detlef Bothe as SS-Gruppenführer Carl Oberg (uncredited)
- Arthur Klemt as SS-Standartenführer Helmut Knochen (uncredited)
- Harry Blank as Generalleutnant Rudolf Schmundt (uncredited)
- Karl Knaup as Roland Freisler (uncredited)
