= HeliCops – Einsatz über Berlin =

- Starring: Christoph M. Ohrt
- Country of origin: Germany

HeliCops – Einsatz über Berlin (English: HeliCops – Operation over Berlin) is a German television series.
