= Flight of the Albatross =

- Directed by: Werner Meyer
- Written by: Riwia Brown
- Produced by: Vincent Burke; Susanne Wagner; Udo Heiland
- Starring: Taungaroa Emile; Julia Brendler
- Narrated by: Grant Tilly
- Cinematography: Martin Gressmann
- Edited by: Michael Horton
- Music by: Jan Preston
- Release date: 6 July 1996
- Running time: 90 min
- Countries: Germany; New Zealand
- Language: English

Flight of the Albatross, also known as Der Flug des Albatros, is a German-New Zealand film. It is based on the Deborah Savage novel of the same name. It was filmed on Great Barrier Island in early 1995. It had its New Zealand cinema debut on 6 July 1996 at Great Barrier Island before opening in Auckland the next week.

Māori teenager and German girl form a relationship after she arrives on his island while dealing with an ancient Māori curse and a wounded albatross.

== Cast ==
- Taungaroa Emile as Mako
- Julia Brendler as Sarh
- Suzanne von Borsody as Claudia
- Pete Smith as Huka
- Jack Thompson as Mike
- Diana Ngaromutu-Heka as Mari

== Reception ==
Reina Whaitiri in The Contemporary Pacific wrote "The word melodrama came to mind as I watched, half-heartedly, the coming together of two very immature and somewhat shallow characters, each absorbed with their own problems." She finished "As a film targeted at young adults Flight of the Albatross fulfills the criteria but would probably leave a wider, more mature audience unsatisfied." In New Zealand film, 1912-1996 Helen Martin wrote "Many of the actors give spirited performances but, because some performances are wooden, and much of the dialogue is awkward, not all the characters convince. The plot is overloaded with twists and turns, and the symbolism weighs so heavily - shark, earring, albatross, patu, gold comb, bird incubations, flutes - that the narrative has the predictability of melodrama, and the message (adults will let you down, take responsibility for yourself) is unsubtly delivered." Cinema Aotearoa said "Aside from a mildly amusing albatross puppet, there's really not much to recommend with Flight of the Albatross. Its harmlessness is its downfall, and the film will likely be forgotten mere hours after a viewing." Robyn Duncan Cox in the Eastern Courier wrote "Many conflicting expectations of the two [main characters] intertwine with their traditional differences making for gentle and provocative drama. The star of the film is undoubtedly Great Barrier Island. With its myriad changing faces, enticing and captivating with all profiles and moods ‘on camera’ it merits diva status."

== Awards ==
1996 New Zealand Film Awards

- Best Supporting Actor - Pete Smith - won

47th Berlin International Film Festival - Crystal Bear
