= Christine Sommer =

Austrian actress

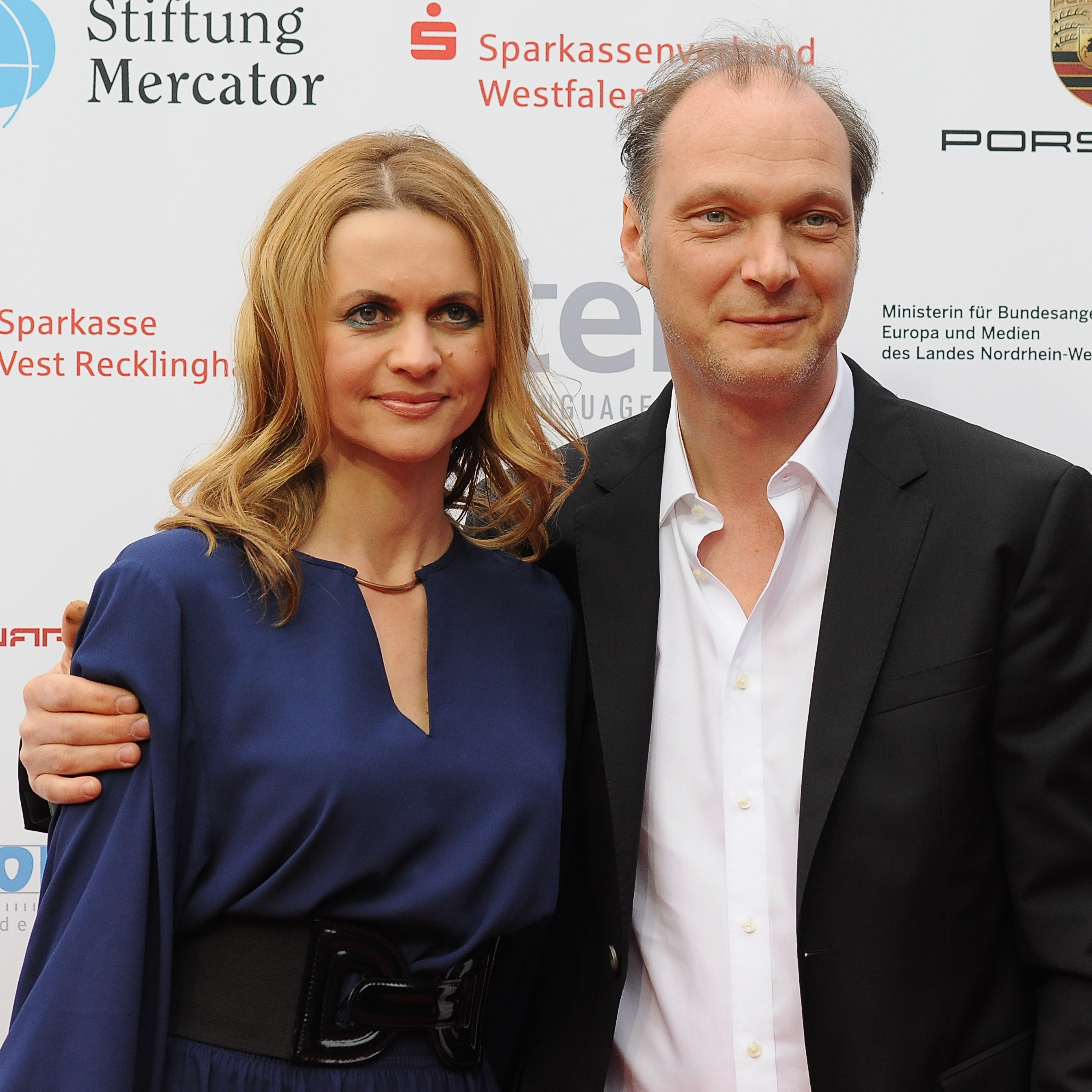
- Sommer with her husband Martin Brambach in 2014
- Born: 1970 (age 54–55); Vienna, Austria
- Occupation: Actress
- Spouse: Martin Brambach

Christine Sommer (born 1970) is an Austrian actress.

== Life and career ==
Born in Vienna, Sommer completed her training as an actress in the years 1986 to 1990 at the Max Reinhardt Seminar. This was followed by engagements at various theaters in Vienna, Tübingen, Braunschweig, and at the Ruhr Festival in Recklinghausen. On television, she appeared in Inspector Rex and SOKO Wismar, among other series.

From March 2009 to February 2010, Sommer was in the ZDF telenovela Alisa – Folge deinem Herzen as Cornelia "Connie" Hundt. In April 2021, Sommer took part in the #allesdichtmachen campaign, in which more than 50 actors commented on the measures taken to contain the COVID-19 pandemic in ironic and satirical videos.

Sommer lives with her partner, actor Martin Brambach, daughters, and son in Recklinghausen.
