= Edel & Starck =

German television series

- Genre: Legal drama
- Created by: Dirk Eisfeld
- Starring: Christoph M. Ohrt; Rebecca Immanuel
- Opening theme: It's Not Unusual
- Composer: Thomas Klemm
- Country of origin: Germany
- Original language: German
- No. of seasons: 4
- No. of episodes: 52

Production
- Running time: 46 minutes
- Production company: Phoenix Film

Original release
- Network: Sat.1
- Release: 2002 – 2005

Edel & Starck is a German television series about a fictional law firm of the same name.

== Cast and characters ==
- Christoph M. Ohrt as Felix Edel
- Rebecca Immanuel as Sandra Starck

== See also ==
- List of German television series
