= Over My Dead Body (1995 film) =

1995 film

- Directed by: Rainer Matsutani
- Written by: Rainer Matsutani; Sebastian Niemann
- Produced by: Jürgen Hebstreit
- Starring: Christoph M. Ohrt; Katja Riemann
- Cinematography: Gerhard Schirlo
- Edited by: Hana Müllner
- Music by: Nikos Patyrachos
- Production company: Engram Pictures GmbH
- Release date: 31 August 1995
- Running time: 104 minutes
- Country: Germany
- Language: German

Over My Dead Body (German: Nur über meine Leiche) is a 1995 German romantic black comedy film directed by Rainer Matsutani. It stars Christoph M. Ohrt and Katja Riemann. The film follows Fred, a selfish womanizer who is killed by a hitman after his wife tires of his infidelity. Fred goes to Hell but makes a deal with Death that if he can heal the hearts of three women he's mistreated, he will be given a second chance at life.

== Plot ==
Fred, a selfish macho type, runs the "Amor" matchmaking agency and frequently gets involved with his attractive customers. When his wife and business partner has had enough of his affairs, she has Fred murdered by a professional killer. After his death he wakes up on a ferry across the Styx. The dialogue at this point is very funny: "Who are you?" "I am the ferryman who brings the souls of the deceased to the afterlife." "And where the hell are you taking me?" "Your question already contains the answer." But it turns out differently; With his negotiating skills, he manages to enter into a deal with the ferryman: if he makes three heartbroken women happy within three days, he will get his life back. If he fails, he has to go to the engine room of the ferry. "Those who are there would wish they were in Hell."

Shortly after his accident, Fred ends up in Rita Hauser's coal cellar, which his agency has not yet been able to find. She wonders how Fred got under her coals and offers the dirty and battered man her help.

In the meantime, Charlotte Wischnewski receives news of her husband's accident. However, since the accident victim himself has disappeared, Charlotte complains to the hired killer and unceremoniously kills him with a poisoned arrow. She finds a new ally in her colleague Frosch and assigns him to look for Fred, because she wants to be sure that he is really dead and that she has the company to herself.

Fred stays in contact with the hereafter, from which he receives support. His mother visits him after a reincarnation in the form of a turkey, which he finds in Rita's refrigerator. When Rita experiences her Sunday roast talking to Fred, she briefly faints him. But she too has a secret, because she is a militant animal rights activist and, among other things, frees rabbits from test laboratories. So she offers Fred and his mother to live in her house for the near future. When he stands up for Rita's rescued animals, she also wants to help him with his tasks in return. First, Fred wants to take care of his sixteen-year-old daughter Lisa, whom he had completely neglected in recent years and who has gotten into the clutches of pimps. Because Fred cannot die, he survives their attacks and, with Rita's help, can save the girl and see to it that the pimps are arrested. With that he has completed his first task and turns to the second: Lisa's mother. She threw herself out of the window twelve years ago out of lovesickness and since then her soul has found no rest. He succeeds in persuading Barbara to leave earth for good.

Charlotte is still looking for Fred and hopes to finally find his body. He again suspects that his wife is the third person he is supposed to help her happiness. Therefore, he wants to make up with her, although he slowly realizes that he has fallen in love with Rita. When Charlotte accidentally hits herself with one of her poison arrows and dies, Fred fears that he will not be able to complete his last task. In his desperation, he argues massively with Rita, who then wants to take her own life. At the last second he snatches the syringe she wants to use to kill herself. He has thus unplanned the third task to get his life back, and ultimately finds his true love in Rita.

== Cast ==
- Christoph M. Ohrt as Fred Wischnewski
- Katja Riemann as Rita Hauser
- Ulrike Folkerts as Charlotte
- Julia Brendler as Lisa
- Felix Eitner as Frosch
- Udo Kier as Killer
- David Michael Williamson as Tod
- Claudia Schlenger as Gerda
- Klaus Stiglmeier as Sanitäter
- Joseph Hannesschläger as Sanitäter

== Reception ==
A review in Lexikon des internationalen Films said the film is "an over-the-top black comedy with an exuberant level of interwoven plot threads, whimsical and macabre, boisterous and silly...while remaining remarkably imaginative. The outlay on equipment and technical effects is matched by excellent acting performances that absorb the grotesque game."

== Planned remake ==
In 2012, it was announced director Andy Fickman was set to direct an American remake of Nur über meine Leiche, though these plans never materialized.
