= List of German films of the 2020s =

This is a list of some of the most notable films produced in Cinema of Germany in the 2020s.

For an alphabetical list of articles on German films, see Category:2020s German films.

== 2020 ==
| Title | Director | Cast | Genre | Notes |
|---|---|---|---|---|
| 9 Days Awake | Damian John Harper | Jannik Schümann, Peri Baumeister, Heike Makatsch, Benno Fürmann | Drama | a.k.a. Nine Days Awake |
| Adventures of a Mathematician | Thorsten Klein | Philippe Tłokiński, Esther Garrel, Ryan Gage, Sam Keeley, Joel Basman, Sabin Tambrea | Biography | German-Polish-British co-production |
| Der Alte und die Nervensäge | Uljana Havemann | Jürgen Prochnow | Comedy | a.k.a. The Old Man and the Pain in the Neck |
| And Tomorrow the Entire World | Julia von Heinz | Mala Emde | Drama | |
| Auf dünnem Eis | Sabine Bernardi | Julia Koschitz, Carlo Ljubek | Drama | a.k.a. On Thin Ice |
| Automotive | Jonas Heldt | | Documentary | |
| Aware: Glimpses of Consciousness | Frauke Sandig, Eric Black | | Documentary | German-American co-production |
| Berlin Alexanderplatz | Burhan Qurbani | Welket Bungué, Jella Haase, Albrecht Schuch, Joachim Król | Drama | |
| Black Milk | Uisenma Borchu | Uisenma Borchu | Drama | Mongolian-German co-production |
| Christmas Crossfire | Detlev Buck | Kostja Ullmann, Alli Neumann, Merlin Rose, Sascha Alexander Geršak, Peter Kurth | Crime comedy | a.k.a. Wir können nicht anders. Released by Netflix |
| Cocoon | Leonie Krippendorff | Lena Urzendowsky, Jella Haase, Lena Klenke | Drama | a.k.a. Kokon |
| Contra | Sönke Wortmann | Christoph Maria Herbst, Nilam Farooq | Comedy | Remake of Le Brio (2017) |
| Cortex | Moritz Bleibtreu | Moritz Bleibtreu, Nadja Uhl, Jannis Niewöhner | Thriller | |
| Curveball | Johannes Naber | Sebastian Blomberg, Dar Salim, Virginia Kull | Comedy | a.k.a. Operation Curveball |
| Dawn Breaks Behind the Eyes | Kevin Kopacka | Jeff Wilbusch | Horror | a.k.a. Hinter den Augen die Dämmerung |
| The Decision | Sven Fehrensen | Jasna Fritzi Bauer, Felix Klare, Frederick Lau, Jeanette Hain | Thriller | |
| Divine | Jan Schomburg | Callum Turner, Matilda De Angelis | Comedy | a.k.a. Der göttliche Andere. German-Italian co-production |
| Dragon Rider | Tomer Eshed | —N/a | Animated film | |
| Ecocide | Andres Veiel | Friederike Becht, Nina Kunzendorf, Edgar Selge, Ulrich Tukur | Science fiction | a.k.a. Ökozid |
| Enfant Terrible | Oskar Roehler | Oliver Masucci | Biography | |
| Exile | Visar Morina | Mišel Matičević, Sandra Hüller, Rainer Bock, Flonja Kodheli | Drama | Kosovan-German-Belgian co-production |
| Exit | Sebastian Marka | Friedrich Mücke | Science fiction | |
| A Fish Swimming Upside Down | Eliza Petkova | Theo Trebs, Henning Kober, Nina Schwabe | Drama | |
| Four Enchanted Sisters | Sven Unterwaldt | Laila Padotzke, Hedda Erlebach, Katja Riemann, Justus von Dohnányi | Family | a.k.a. 4 Enchanted Sisters. German-Austrian co-production |
| Freaks: You're One of Us | Felix Binder | Cornelia Gröschel, Tim Oliver Schultz, Wotan Wilke Möhring | Superhero film | Released by Netflix |
| Für immer Sommer 90 | Lars Jessen, Jan Georg Schütte | Charly Hübner, Karoline Schuch, Lisa Maria Potthoff, Peter Schneider, Stefanie Stappenbeck, Christina Große, Roman Knižka | Drama | |
| Gaza mon amour | Tarzan Nasser, Arab Nasser | Salim Daw, Hiam Abbass | Drama | Palestinian-French-German-Portuguese-Qatari co-production |
| God, You're Such a Prick | André Erkau | Sinje Irslinger, Max Hubacher, Heike Makatsch, Til Schweiger, Jürgen Vogel | Drama | a.k.a. Gott, du kannst ein Arsch sein! |
| Granny Nanny | Wolfgang Groos | Maren Kroymann, Heiner Lauterbach, Barbara Sukowa, Günther Maria Halmer, Dominic Raacke, Palina Rojinski | Comedy | a.k.a. Enkel für Anfänger |
| A Handful of Water | Jakob Zapf | Jürgen Prochnow | Drama | |
| Eine harte Tour | Isabel Kleefeld | Anna Schudt, Juliane Köhler, Anna Unterberger, Benjamin Sadler | Drama | |
| Hello Again: A Wedding a Day | Maggie Peren | Alicia von Rittberg, Edin Hasanović, Tim Oliver Schultz, Emilia Schüle | Comedy | a.k.a. Hello Again – Ein Tag für immer |
| Home | Franka Potente | Jake McLaughlin, Kathy Bates | Drama | German-Dutch-French-American co-production |
| Im Abgrund | Stefan Bühling | Tobias Moretti, Peter Kurth, Simon Schwarz, Florian Stetter | Thriller | |
| Im Tal des Fuchses | Till Franzen | Benjamin Sadler, Ludwig Trepte, Lisa Bitter, Teresa Harder, Arnd Klawitter, Christina Hecke, Deleila Piasko, Katharina Schüttler, Bill Fellows | Thriller | a.k.a. In the Valley of the Fox |
| In Berlin wächst kein Orangenbaum | Kida Khodr Ramadan | Kida Khodr Ramadan, Anna Schudt, Stipe Erceg | Crime | |
| Insecure: All the Best for the Future | Jörg Lühdorff | Henny Reents, Martin Brambach | Drama | a.k.a. Verunsichert – Alles Gute für die Zukunft |
| Into the Beat | Stefan Westerwelle | Alexandra Pfeifer, Yalany Marschner, Trystan Pütter, Helen Schneider | Music | |
| Isi & Ossi | Oliver Kienle | Lisa Vicari, Dennis Mojen | Comedy | a.k.a. Isi and Ossi. Released by Netflix |
| It's for Your Own Good | Marc Rothemund | Heiner Lauterbach, Jürgen Vogel, Hilmi Sözer | Comedy | Remake of It's for Your Own Good (2017) |
| It's Gonna Be Fine | Christian Werner | Fabian Hinrichs, Franziska Walser, Michael Wittenborn, Maresi Riegner | Comedy | a.k.a. Irgendwann ist auch mal gut |
| Jackpot | Emily Atef | Rosalie Thomass, Friedrich Mücke | Thriller | |
| Johannes Kepler – Der Himmelsstürmer | Christian Twente | Christoph Bach, Heiko Pinkowski | Biography, Docudrama | a.k.a. Johannes Kepler: Storming the Heavens |
| The Kangaroo Chronicles | Dani Levy | Dimitrij Schaad, Rosalie Thomass, Henry Hübchen | Comedy, Fantasy | |
| Kein einfacher Mord | Sebastian Ko | Laura Tonke, Felix Klare | Thriller | |
| Kids Run | Barbara Ott | Jannis Niewöhner | Drama, Sport | |
| Kinder und andere Baustellen | Christina Schiewe | Julia-Maria Köhler, Valerie Niehaus, Marlene Morreis, Yasemin Cetinkaya | Comedy | |
| King of Ravens | Piotr J. Lewandowski | Antje Traue, Malik Blumenthal | Drama | |
| Kiss Me Kosher | Shirel Peleg | Moran Rosenblatt, Luise Wolfram, Rivka Michaeli | Comedy | a.k.a. Kiss Me Before It Blows Up. Israeli-German co-production |
| Lang lebe die Königin | Richard Huber | Hannelore Elsner, Marlene Morreis, Günther Maria Halmer (and with Hannelore Hoger, Judy Winter, Gisela Schneeberger, Iris Berben, Eva Mattes) | Drama | |
| Lassie Come Home | Hanno Olderdissen | Nico Marischka, Bella Bading, Sebastian Bezzel, Anna Maria Mühe, Matthias Habich, Justus von Dohnányi | Family | |
| The Last City | Heinz Emigholz | John Erdman | Drama | a.k.a. Die letzte Stadt |
| Der Liebhaber meiner Frau | Dirk Kummer | Suzanne von Borsody, Christian Kohlund, Walter Sittler | Comedy | |
| Lindenberg! Mach dein Ding | Hermine Huntgeburth | Jan Bülow, Detlev Buck, Max von der Groeben, Charly Hübner, Julia Jentsch, Ella Rumpf | Musical, Biography | a.k.a. Udo Lindenberg |
| Lost in Marseille | Roland Suso Richter | Fabian Busch, Sabrina Amali | Thriller | a.k.a. Spurlos in Marseille |
| Louis van Beethoven | Niki Stein | Tobias Moretti, Anselm Bresgott, Colin Pütz, Ulrich Noethen, Silke Bodenbender | Biography, Music | German-Austrian-Czech co-production |
| Love & Mazel Tov | Wolfgang Murnberger | Verena Altenberger, Maxim Mehmet, Dieter Hallervorden | Comedy | a.k.a. Love and Mazel Tov a.k.a. Schönes Schlamassel. German-Austrian co-production |
| Madison: A Fast Friendship | Kim Strobl | Felice Ahrens, Florian Lukas | Family | German-Austrian co-production |
| The Magic Kids: Three Unlikely Heroes | Tim Trageser | Aaron Kissiov, Johanna Schraml, Arsseni Bultmann, Christian Berkel, Sonja Gerhardt, Rick Kavanian | Family | a.k.a. Die Wolf-Gäng |
| Merkel: Anatomy of a Crisis | Stephan Wagner | Imogen Kogge, Josef Bierbichler, Walter Sittler, Rüdiger Vogler | Docudrama | a.k.a. Die Getriebenen |
| Monster Hunter | Paul W. S. Anderson | Milla Jovovich, Ron Perlman | Science fantasy action | American-German-Japanese-Chinese-Canadian co-production |
| Narcissus and Goldmund | Stefan Ruzowitzky | Jannis Niewöhner, Sabin Tambrea, Kida Khodr Ramadan, Emilia Schüle, Henriette Confurius, André Hennicke, Uwe Ochsenknecht, Jessica Schwarz, Matthias Habich | Drama | German-Austrian co-production |
| Nicht tot zu kriegen | Nina Grosse | Iris Berben, Murathan Muslu, Barnaby Metschurat, Philipp Hochmair | Thriller | a.k.a. Impossible to Kill a.k.a. Ein Schlag ins Gesicht |
| Nightlife | Simon Verhoeven | Elyas M'Barek, Palina Rojinski, Frederick Lau | Comedy | |
| No Hard Feelings | Faraz Shariat | Benjamin Radjaipour, Banafshe Hourmazdi, Eidin Jalali | Drama | a.k.a. Futur Drei |
| One of These Days | Bastian Günther | Joe Cole, Carrie Preston, Callie Hernandez, Cullen Moss, Lucy Faust, Lara Grice, Billy Slaughter | Drama | American-German co-production |
| Persian Lessons | Vadim Perelman | Nahuel Pérez Biscayart, Lars Eidinger, Jonas Nay | Drama, War | a.k.a. Persischstunden. Belarusian-German-Russian co-production |
| Playing God | Lars Kraume | Matthias Habich, Anna Maria Mühe, Christiane Paul, Barbara Auer, Ina Weisse, Lars Eidinger | Drama | a.k.a. GOTT |
| Plötzlich so still | Lars-Gunnar Lotz | Friederike Becht, Hanno Koffler, Nadja Bobyleva | Drama | a.k.a. Suddenly So Quiet |
| Resistance | Jonathan Jakubowicz | Jesse Eisenberg, Clémence Poésy, Matthias Schweighöfer, Bella Ramsey, Ed Harris, Édgar Ramírez | Biography, War | American-French-British-German co-production |
| Rising High | Cüneyt Kaya | David Kross, Frederick Lau, Janina Uhse | Crime comedy | a.k.a. Betonrausch. Released by Netflix |
| Der Schneegänger | Josef Rusnak | Nadja Bobyleva, Max Riemelt, Stipe Erceg | Crime | |
| Ein Schritt zu viel | Katharina Bischof | Lilith Häßle, Nicki von Tempelhoff, Daniel Sträßer | Drama | |
| Sisters Apart | Daphne Charizani | Almila Bagriacik, Zübeyde Bulut | War | a.k.a. Im Feuer – Zwei Schwestern |
| Sky Sharks | Marc Fehse | Thomas Morris, Barbara Nedeljáková, Eva Habermann, Tony Todd, Amanda Bearse | Horror | |
| Sleep | Michael Venus | Sandra Hüller, Gro Swantje Kohlhof, Marion Kracht, August Schmölzer, Max Hubacher | Horror | |
| Sörensen's Fear | Bjarne Mädel | Bjarne Mädel, Anne Ratte-Polle, Matthias Brandt, Peter Kurth | Crime | a.k.a. Sörensen hat Angst |
| Thin Blood | Mehrdad Taheri | Simon Licht, Kida Khodr Ramadan | Crime | |
| This House is Mine | Sherry Hormann | Iris Berben, Maria Ehrich, Nina Kunzendorf, Karoline Eichhorn, Milan Peschel, Jacob Matschenz | Drama | a.k.a. Altes Land |
| Die Toten am Meer | Johannes Grieser | Karoline Schuch, Charlotte Schwab, Christoph Letkowski, Martin Wuttke | Crime | |
| The Trouble with Being Born | Sandra Wollner | Lena Watson | Science fiction | Austrian-German co-production |
| The Turncoat | Florian Gallenberger | Jannis Niewöhner, Rainer Bock, Bjarne Mädel, Florian Lukas, Katharina Schüttler, Ulrich Tukur | War | |
| Undine | Christian Petzold | Paula Beer, Franz Rogowski, Jacob Matschenz | Drama, Fantasy | German-French co-production |
| Unorthodox | Maria Schrader | Shira Haas, Amit Rahav, Jeff Wilbusch, Alex Reid, Dina Doron, Aaron Altaras, Aziz Dyab, Delia Mayer | Drama | Released by Netflix |
| Das Unwort | Leo Khasin | Iris Berben, Ursina Lardi, Thomas Sarbacher, Anna Brüggemann, Devid Striesow | Comedy | a.k.a. A Bad Word |
| The Valley of the Murderers | Peter Keglevic | Anna Unterberger, Fritz Karl | Thriller | German-Austrian co-production |
| Veins of the World | Byambasuren Davaa | Bat-Ireedui Batmunkh | Drama | Mongolian-German co-production |
| Das Verhör in der Nacht | Matti Geschonneck | Sophie von Kessel, Charly Hübner | Drama | |
| Vivos | Ai Weiwei | | Documentary | German-Mexican co-production |
| Walchensee Forever | Janna Ji Wonders | | Documentary | |
| We Are the Law | Markus Imboden | Julia Koschitz, Aljoscha Stadelmann, Bernadette Heerwagen, Merab Ninidze, Marc Hosemann | Crime comedy | a.k.a. Das Gesetz sind wir |
| The Wedding | Til Schweiger | Til Schweiger, Milan Peschel, Samuel Finzi, Stefanie Stappenbeck, Jeanette Hain, Katharina Schüttler | Comedy | Remake of Klassefesten 2 - Begravelsen (2014) |
| Weihnachtstöchter | Rolf Silber | Felicitas Woll, Gesine Cukrowski, Tim Bergmann | Comedy | a.k.a. Christmas Daughters |
| Wer einmal stirbt dem glaubt man nicht | Dirk Kummer | Julia Koschitz, Heino Ferch | Comedy | a.k.a. Blöd gelaufen – Danke für den Abschied |
| Wo ist die Liebe hin | Alexander Dierbach | Ulrike C. Tscharre, Roeland Wiesnekker, Anneke Kim Sarnau, Rainer Bock | Drama | |
| Ziemlich russische Freunde | Esther Gronenborn | Oliver Mommsen, Susanna Simon, Anton von Lucke, Wolfgang Stumph, Yevgeni Sitokhin, Katerina Medvedeva, Barbara Prakopenka | Comedy | |
| Zum Glück gibt's Schreiner | Neelesha Barthel | Henriette Richter-Röhl, Jochen Matschke, Thekla Carola Wied | Comedy | a.k.a. Downdating a.k.a. A Perfect Fit |

== 2021 ==
| Title | Director | Cast | Genre | Notes |
|---|---|---|---|---|
| 3½ Hours | Ed Herzog | Jeff Wilbusch, Jördis Triebel, Uwe Kockisch, Steffi Kühnert, Peter Schneider, Vincent Redetzki, Susanne Bormann, Martin Feifel, Hannah Schiller | Drama | a.k.a. Three and a Half Hours a.k.a. 3½ Stunden |
| The Air We Breathe | Martin Enlen | Neda Rahmanian, Katja Studt, Rainer Bock, Thomas Loibl, Patrycia Ziółkowska, Bernadette Heerwagen, Katharina Nesytowa | Drama | |
| Alice, Through the Looking | Adam Donen | Saskia Axten, Elijah Rowen, Vanessa Redgrave, Sophie Vavasseur, Steven Berkoff, Slavoj Zizek, Carol Cleveland | Political Fantasy comedy satire | British-German co-production. a.k.a. Alice, Through the Looking: À La Recherche d'Un Lapin Perdu |
| The Allegation | Daniel Prochaska | Peter Kurth, Narges Rashidi, Sebastian Urzendowsky, Désirée Nosbusch, Julika Jenkins | Crime | a.k.a. Glauben |
| Am Ende der Worte | Nina Vukovic | Lisa Vicari, Ludwig Trepte, André Hennicke | Crime | |
| Another Love | Michaela Kezele | Lucie Heinze, Golo Euler | Drama | a.k.a. Eine Liebe später |
| Army of Thieves | Matthias Schweighöfer | Matthias Schweighöfer, Nathalie Emmanuel, Ruby O. Fee, Stuart Martin, Guz Khan, Jonathan Cohen | Crime | American-German co-production. Released by Netflix |
| At His Side | Felix Karolus | Senta Berger, Peter Simonischek, Antje Traue, Thomas Thieme | Drama | |
| Beckenrand Sheriff | Marcus H. Rosenmüller | Milan Peschel, Johanna Wokalek, Gisela Schneeberger | Comedy | |
| Bergman Island | Mia Hansen-Løve | Vicky Krieps, Tim Roth, Mia Wasikowska, Anders Danielsen Lie | Drama | French-German-Swedish co-production |
| Der Beschützer | Philipp Osthus | Tobias Oertel, Marlene Tanczik | Thriller | a.k.a. The Protector |
| Birth of a Champion | Hannu Salonen | Bruno Alexander, Samuel Finzi, Mišel Matičević | Biography, Sport | a.k.a. Boris Becker: Der Rebell |
| Black Island | Miguel Alexandre | Philip Froissant, Alice Dwyer, Hanns Zischler | Thriller | Released by Netflix |
| The Black Square | Peter Meister | Jacob Matschenz, Bernhard Schütz, Sandra Hüller | Crime comedy | |
| Bliss | Henrika Kull | Katharina Behrens, Adam Hoya | Drama | a.k.a. Glück |
| Blood Red Sky | Peter Thorwarth | Peri Baumeister, Dominic Purcell, Alexander Scheer | Horror | German-British co-production. Released by Netflix |
| Bloodsuckers | Julian Radlmaier | Alexandre Koberidze, Lilith Stangenberg, Corinna Harfouch | Comedy | |
| Borga | York-Fabian Raabe | Eugene Boateng, Christiane Paul, Lydia Forson, Adjetey Anang, Thelma Buabeng | Drama | German-Ghanaian co-production |
| Catweazle | Sven Unterwaldt | Otto Waalkes, Julius Weckauf, Henning Baum, Katja Riemann | Comedy, Fantasy | |
| Christmas on the Runway | Stefan Bühling | Henning Baum, Lisa Bitter, Meike Droste, Jan Henrik Stahlberg, Ernst Stötzner | Comedy | a.k.a. Wenn das fünfte Lichtlein brennt |
| Cloudy Clouds | Christian Schäfer | Jonas Holdenrieder, Devid Striesow | Thriller | a.k.a. Trübe Wolken |
| Commitment Phobia | Helena Hufnagel | Frederick Lau, Luise Heyer | Comedy | a.k.a. Generation Beziehungsunfähig |
| Compassionate Use | Elmar Fischer | Lisa Maria Potthoff | Drama | a.k.a. A Risky Decision a.k.a. Saving Emily |
| Confessions of Felix Krull | Detlev Buck | Jannis Niewöhner, Liv Lisa Fries, Joachim Król | Comedy | |
| Copilot | Anne Zohra Berrached | Canan Kir, Roger Azar | Drama | a.k.a. Die Welt wird eine andere sein. German-French co-production |
| The Curse | Marie Kreutzer | Regina Fritsch, Julia Franz Richter, Laurence Rupp, Manuel Rubey | Thriller | a.k.a. Vier. Austrian-German co-production |
| Da kommt noch was | Mareille Klein | Ulrike Willenbacher, Zbigniew Zamachowski | Comedy | a.k.a. Monday um Zehn. German-Swiss co-production |
| Dad Got Grounded | Tomy Wigand | Heino Ferch, Pablo Grant, Harriet Herbig-Matten, Picco von Groote, Sheri Hagen | Comedy | a.k.a. Nie zu spät |
| Dangerous Truth | Jens Wischnewski | Lisa Maria Potthoff, Ulrike Kriener, Christoph Letkowski, Torben Liebrecht | Crime | |
| Daughters | Nana Neul | Alexandra Maria Lara, Birgit Minichmayr, Josef Bierbichler | Drama | |
| Dawn Breaks Behind the Eyes | Kevin Kopacka | Anna Platen, Jeff Wilbusch, Luisa Taraz, Frederik von Lüttichau | Horror | |
| Dear Future Children | Franz Böhm | | Documentary | |
| Dear Thomas | Andreas Kleinert | Albrecht Schuch, Jella Haase, Jörg Schüttauf | Biography | a.k.a. Thomas Brasch |
| Delivered | Jan Fehse | Bjarne Mädel | Drama | |
| Eisland | Ute Wieland | Axel Prahl, Jan Henrik Stahlberg | Black comedy | |
| Enemies | Nils Willbrandt | Klaus Maria Brandauer, Bjarne Mädel | Drama | a.k.a. Feinde – Gegen die Zeit a.k.a. Feinde – Das Geständnis |
| Everything on Red | Lars Becker | Nicholas Ofczarek, Fritz Karl, Jessica Schwarz, Melika Foroutan, Kida Khodr Ramadan, Ferris MC | Crime | |
| Everything Will Change | Marten Persiel | Noah Saavedra | Science fiction | German-Dutch co-production |
| Fabian: Going to the Dogs | Dominik Graf | Tom Schilling, Saskia Rosendahl, Albrecht Schuch | Drama | |
| Fly | Katja von Garnier | Svenja Jung, Ben Wichert, Majid Kessab, Jasmin Tabatabai, Nicolette Krebitz, Katja Riemann | Music | |
| The Forest Maker | Volker Schlöndorff | Tony Rinaudo | Documentary | |
| Forever Parents | Florian Schwarz | Devid Striesow, Anja Schneider, Max Schimmelpfennig | Comedy | a.k.a. Parents Forever |
| The Four of Us | Florian Gottschick | Nilam Farooq, Jonas Nay, Paula Kalenberg, Louis Nitsche | Drama | a.k.a. Du Sie Er & Wir. Released by Netflix |
| Freunde | Rick Ostermann | Ulrich Matthes, Justus von Dohnányi | Drama | |
| Future Is a Lonely Place | Martin Hawie, Laura Harwarth | Lucas Gregorowicz, Katharina Schüttler, Denis Moschitto | Crime | |
| Gefangen | Elke Hauck | Wolfram Koch, Antje Traue | Thriller | a.k.a. The House |
| The Girl with the Golden Hands | Katharina Marie Schubert | Corinna Harfouch, Birte Schnöink, Jörg Schüttauf | Drama | |
| Goldjungs | Christoph Schnee | Michelle Barthel, Tim Oliver Schultz, Waldemar Kobus, Leslie Malton | Crime comedy | |
| Great Freedom | Sebastian Meise | Franz Rogowski, Georg Friedrich | Drama | |
| Hannes | Hans Steinbichler | Leonard Scheicher, Johannes Nussbaum, Heiner Lauterbach, Hannelore Elsner | Drama | |
| Heiko's World | Dominik Galizia | Martin Rohde | Comedy | |
| Heute stirbt hier Kainer | Maria-Anna Westholzer | Martin Wuttke, Justus von Dohnányi, Britta Hammelstein, Christian Redl, Martin Feifel | Crime | |
| Hotel Europa | Thorsten Schmidt | Jonathan Berlin, Benjamin Sadler, Katharina Schüttler, Pauline Rénevier, Nicole Heesters | Drama | a.k.a. Das weiße Haus am Rhein |
| The House | Rick Ostermann | Tobias Moretti | Science fiction | a.k.a. Das Haus |
| Human Factors | Ronny Trocker | Sabine Timoteo, Mark Waschke | Drama | German-Italian-Danish co-production |
| Hyperland | Mario Sixtus | Lorna Ishema | Science fiction | |
| I'm Your Man | Maria Schrader | Maren Eggert, Dan Stevens, Sandra Hüller | Science fiction | a.k.a. Ich bin dein Mensch |
| The Ibiza Affair | Christopher Schier | Nicholas Ofczarek, Andreas Lust, Anna Gorshkova | Crime | Austrian-German co-production |
| Immer der Nase nach | Kerstin Polte | Claudia Michelsen, Corinna Harfouch, Angela Winkler, Lena Klenke | Comedy | a.k.a. Always Follow Your Nose |
| In the Woods | Manuel Weiss | Tobias Kay, Jolie Sarah Werner | Horror | a.k.a. Im Wald |
| Inside the Uffizi | Corinna Belz, Enrique Sánchez Lansch | | Documentary | |
| Instructions for Survival | Yana Ugrekhelidze | | Documentary | |
| It's Just a Phase, Honeybunny | Florian Gallenberger | Christoph Maria Herbst, Christiane Paul, Jytte-Merle Böhrnsen, Nicola Perot, Jürgen Vogel, Ulrich Tukur | Comedy | a.k.a. It's Just a Phase, Honey a.k.a. Es ist nur eine Phase, Hase |
| Je suis Karl | Christian Schwochow | Jannis Niewöhner, Luna Wedler, Milan Peschel | Drama | |
| Kaiserspiel – Bismarcks Reichsgründung in Versailles | Christian Twente | Thomas Thieme, Peter Meinhardt, Hubertus Hartmann | History, Docudrama | |
| King Otto | Christopher André Marks | Otto Rehhagel | Documentary, Sport | Greek-American-British-German co-production |
| The Last Execution | Franziska Stünkel | Lars Eidinger, Devid Striesow, Luise Heyer | Drama | a.k.a. Nahschuss |
| Laura's Star | Joya Thome | Emilia Kowalski | Family | |
| Leben über Kreuz | Dagmar Seume | Benjamin Sadler, Annette Frier, Christina Hecke, André Szymanski | Drama | a.k.a. Crisscrossed Lives |
| The Maths of Love | Ingo Rasper | Heino Ferch, Tanja Wedhorn, Michael Gwisdek, Knut Berger | Comedy | a.k.a. Liebe ist unberechenbar |
| Maya the Bee: The Golden Orb | Noel Cleary | —N/a | Animated film | German-Australian co-production |
| Meeresleuchten | Wolfgang Panzer | Ulrich Tukur, Ursina Lardi, Sibel Kekilli, Kostja Ullmann, Günter Lamprecht | Drama | a.k.a. Sea Lights |
| Mich hat keiner gefragt | Nico Sommer | Meike Droste, Oliver Stokowski, Stephan Luca | Comedy | a.k.a. No One Asked Me |
| The Middle Man | Bent Hamer | Pål Sverre Hagen, Tuva Novotny, Paul Gross, Don McKellar, Rossif Sutherland | Comedy | Norwegian-Canadian-Danish-German co-production |
| Miguel's War | Eliane Raheb | Michel (Miguel) Jleilaty | Documentary | Lebanese-Spanish-German co-production |
| Mona & Marie | Marco Petry | Maren Kroymann, Ulrike Kriener | Comedy | a.k.a. Mona und Marie |
| Monster Family 2 | Holger Tappe | —N/a | Animated film | German-British co-production |
| Monte Verità | Stefan Jäger | Maresi Riegner, Julia Jentsch, Hannah Herzsprung, Max Hubacher, Joel Basman | Drama | Swiss-Austrian-German co-production |
| Moonbound | Ali Samadi Ahadi | —N/a | Animated film | a.k.a. Peterchens Mondfahrt |
| Mord in der Familie – Der Zauberwürfel | Michael Schneider | Matthias Koeberlin, Heiner Lauterbach, Lucas Gregorowicz, Katharina Lorenz, Petra Schmidt-Schaller | Crime | |
| Mostly Minimalistic | Natja Brunckhorst | Corinna Harfouch, Daniel Sträßer, Joachim Król | Comedy | a.k.a. Alles in bester Ordnung |
| Mr. Bachmann and His Class | Maria Speth | | Documentary | |
| Mum Calls It Quits | Rainer Kaufmann | Maren Kroymann, Rainer Bock, Jördis Triebel, Ulrike C. Tscharre, Ulrich Tukur | Comedy | a.k.a. Mom Quits a.k.a. Mutter kündigt |
| Munich – The Edge of War | Christian Schwochow | Jeremy Irons, George MacKay, Jannis Niewöhner, Alex Jennings, Sandra Hüller, Liv Lisa Fries, August Diehl | Historical drama | British-German co-production |
| My Son | Lena Stahl | Anke Engelke, Jonas Dassler | Drama | |
| Napoleon - Metternich: Der Anfang vom Ende | Christian Twente, Mathieu Schwartz | Pierre Kiwitt, David Sighicelli | History, Docudrama | |
| Nesting Weeks | Tobi Baumann | Matthias Koeberlin, Bettina Lamprecht, Tom Beck, Jasmin Schwiers, Denis Moschitto | Comedy | a.k.a. Nestwochen |
| Next Door | Daniel Brühl | Daniel Brühl, Peter Kurth | Drama | |
| Nico | Eline Gehring | Sara Fazilat | Drama | |
| Nö | Dietrich Brüggemann | Anna Brüggemann, Alexander Khuon, Hanns Zischler, Petra Schmidt-Schaller, Mark Waschke | Comedy | |
| No One's with the Calves | Sabrina Sarabi | Saskia Rosendahl, Rick Okon, Godehard Giese | Drama | a.k.a. Niemand ist bei den Kälbern |
| One Night Off | Martin Schreier | Emilio Sakraya, Helgi Schmid | Comedy | Released by Amazon Prime Video |
| Other Cannibals | Francesco Sossai | Walter Giroldini, Diego Pagotto | Black comedy | a.k.a. Altri Cannibali |
| Precious Ivie | Sarah Blaßkiewitz | Haley Louise Jones, Lorna Ishema | Drama | a.k.a. Ivie wie Ivie |
| Prey | Thomas Sieben | David Kross, Hanno Koffler, Maria Ehrich | Thriller | Released by Netflix |
| Prince | Lisa Bierwirth | Passi, Ursula Strauss | Drama | |
| The Promise | Till Endemann | Mika Tritto, Ella Morgen, Andreas Döhler, Barbara Auer | Drama | |
| A Pure Place | Nikias Chryssos | Sam Louwyck, Greta Bohacek, Claude Heinrich, Daniel Sträßer | Drama | |
| The Reckoning | Stephan Rick | Kostja Ullmann, Kristin Suckow | Thriller | a.k.a. The Visitation a.k.a. The Infestation a.k.a. Die Heimsuchung |
| Resident Evil: Welcome to Raccoon City | Johannes Roberts | Kaya Scodelario, Hannah John-Kamen, Robbie Amell, Avan Jogia | Horror | German-Canadian co-production |
| Rogue Trader | David Preute | Paulo Aragao | Crime | |
| The Royal Game | Philipp Stölzl | Oliver Masucci, Birgit Minichmayr, Albrecht Schuch | Drama | a.k.a. Chess Story |
| Ruhe! Hier stirbt Lothar | Hermine Huntgeburth | Jens Harzer, Corinna Harfouch | Comedy | |
| The Salvation of the World as We Know It | Til Schweiger | Emilio Sakraya, Tijan Marei, Til Schweiger | Drama | |
| School of Magical Animals | Gregor Schnitzler | Emilia Maier, Nadja Uhl, Justus von Dohnányi, Milan Peschel | Family | a.k.a. The School of the Magical Animals |
| Schumacher | Hanns-Bruno Kammertöns, Vanessa Nöcker, Michael Wech | | Documentary, Sport | a.k.a. Michael Schumacher. Released by Netflix |
| The Search | Till Franzen | Henny Reents, Lucas Gregorowicz | Thriller | |
| Second Thoughts | Zora Rux | Elisa Plüss, Thomas Fränzel | Comedy | a.k.a. Ich Ich Ich |
| The Seed | Mia Maariel Meyer | Hanno Koffler, Andreas Döhler, Robert Stadlober | Drama | |
| Sportabzeichen für Anfänger | Thomas Roth | Andrea Sawatzki, Christian Berkel, Thomas Heinze, Franziska Weisz | Comedy, Sport | |
| Stambul Garden | İlker Çatak | Emil von Schönfels, Mekyas Mulugeta | Drama | a.k.a. Blurred Lines a.k.a. Räuberhände |
| Stand Up | Timo Jacobs | Timo Jacobs, Pegah Ferydoni | Drama | |
| Sterben ist auch keine Lösung | Ingo Rasper | Walter Sittler, Andrea Sawatzki | Comedy | |
| Sugarlove | Isabel Kleefeld | Barbara Auer, Fritz Karl, Cosima Henman | Thriller | |
| Take Me Home | Christiane Balthasar | Silke Bodenbender, Anneke Kim Sarnau | Drama | |
| Tanze Tango mit mir | Filippos Tsitos | Michael A. Grimm, Kara Wenham, Eva Meckbach, Gaby Dohm | Drama, Music | |
| Tides | Tim Fehlbaum | Nora Arnezeder, Iain Glen | Science fiction | German-Swiss co-production |
| Toubab | Florian Dietrich | Farba Dieng, Julius Nitschkoff, Seyneb Saleh | Comedy | |
| The Ugly Truth | Krishna Ashu Bhati | Eva Habermann, Marcus Grüsser, Caroline Hartig | Drama | a.k.a. Die wahre Schönheit |
| The Unbearable Lightness of the Revolution | Andy Fetscher | Janina Fautz | Drama | a.k.a. Die unheimliche Leichtigkeit der Revolution |
| Die Vergesslichkeit der Eichhörnchen | Nadine Heinze, Marc Dietschreit | Emilia Schüle, Günther Maria Halmer, Fabian Hinrichs | Drama | |
| Weißbier im Blut | Jörg Graser | Sigi Zimmerschied | Crime comedy | |
| Die Welt steht still | Anno Saul | Natalia Wörner | Drama | a.k.a. The World Stands Still |
| Wet Dog | Damir Lukačević | Doğuhan Kabadayı, Mohammad Eliraqui, Derya Dilber, Kida Khodr Ramadan | Drama | |
| What Do We See When We Look at the Sky? | Alexandre Koberidze | Ani Karseladze, Giorgi Bochorishvili | Drama | Georgian-German co-production |
| Wikipedia and the Democratization of Knowledge | Lorenza Castella, Jascha Hannover | | Documentary | |
| Windstill | Nancy Camaldo | Giulia Goldammer, Thomas Schubert, Barbara Krzoska | Drama | |
| The Winemaker | Andreas Prochaska | Tobias Moretti, Ursina Lardi, Harald Windisch | Thriller | a.k.a. Im Netz der Camorra. Austrian-German co-production |
| Wirecard | Raymond Ley | Christoph Maria Herbst, Franz Hartwig, Nina Kunzendorf | Docudrama | a.k.a. Der große Fake – Die Wirecard-Story |
| The Witnesses | Jörg Lühdorff | Alexandra Maria Lara, Sylvester Groth, Nilam Farooq, Ceci Chuh, Ralph Herforth | Thriller | a.k.a. 8 Zeugen |
| A Woman | Jeanine Meerapfel | | Documentary | German-Argentinian co-production |
| Wood and Water | Jonas Bak | Anke Bak | Drama | |
| Wrinkle-Free | Dirk Kummer | Adele Neuhauser | Comedy | |
| Zero | Jochen Alexander Freydank | Heike Makatsch, Sabin Tambrea, Axel Stein | Science fiction | |
| Zurück ans Meer | Markus Imboden | Hannelore Hoger, Nina Hoger, Jens Albinus, Morten Suurballe | Thriller | a.k.a. Return to the Sea |

== 2022 ==
| Title | Director | Cast | Genre | Notes |
|---|---|---|---|---|
| 4 Days to Eternity | Konstantin Korenchuk, Simon Pilarski | Lea van Acken, Eric Kabongo, André Hennicke | Drama | a.k.a. Four Days to Eternity |
| A E I O U: A Quick Alphabet of Love | Nicolette Krebitz | Sophie Rois, Udo Kier, Milan Herms, Nicolas Bridet | Comedy | German-French co-production |
| Alice | Nicole Weegmann | Nina Gummich | Biography | a.k.a. Alice Schwarzer |
| All Quiet on the Western Front | Edward Berger | Felix Kammerer, Albrecht Schuch, Daniel Brühl | War | Released by Netflix |
| All Russians Love Birch Trees | Pola Beck | Aylin Tezel, Sohel Altan Gol, Slavko Popadic, Yuval Scharf | Drama | a.k.a. Der Russe ist einer, der Birken liebt |
| Alma & Oskar | Dieter Berner | Emily Cox, Valentin Postlmayr | Biography | a.k.a. Alma and Oskar a.k.a. Alma und Oskar. Austrian-German-Swiss-Czech co-production |
| The Amazing Maurice | Toby Genkel | —N/a | Animated film | German-British co-production |
| And Then Someone Stands Up and Opens the Window | Till Endemann | Iris Berben, Claude Heinrich, Godehard Giese | Drama | a.k.a. Und dann steht einer auf und öffnet das Fenster |
| As Loud as You Can | Esther Bialas | Friederike Becht, Nina Gummich | Drama | |
| Axiom | Jöns Jönsson | Moritz von Treuenfels | Drama | |
| Bis zum letzten Tropfen | Daniel Harrich | Sebastian Bezzel, Ulrich Tukur, Hannah Schiller, Karoline Schuch | Drama | |
| Blutholz | Torsten C. Fischer | Joachim Król, Désirée Nosbusch, Alina Levshin | Thriller | a.k.a. Blood Wood |
| Die Bürgermeisterin | Christiane Balthasar | Anna Schudt, Felix Klare, Alexander Beyer | Drama | a.k.a. The Mayoress |
| Cloud Under the Roof | Alain Gsponer | Frederick Lau, Romy Schroeder, Hannah Herzsprung, Barbara Auer, Kida Khodr Ramadan, Nicolette Krebitz | Drama | |
| Coming Home | Karsten Dahlem | Anna Maria Mühe, Michael Wittenborn | Drama | a.k.a. Die Geschichte einer Familie |
| Corsage | Marie Kreutzer | Vicky Krieps, Florian Teichtmeister, Finnegan Oldfield | Biography | Austrian-German-Luxembourgian-French co-production |
| Dark Satellites | Thomas Stuber | Nastassja Kinski, Martina Gedeck, Charly Hübner, Peter Kurth, Adel Bencherif, Irina Starshenbaum, Albrecht Schuch, Lilith Stangenberg | Drama | a.k.a. Die stillen Trabanten |
| Dear Kurt | Til Schweiger | Til Schweiger, Franziska Machens, Jasmin Gerat, Heiner Lauterbach, Peter Simonischek | Drama | a.k.a. Lieber Kurt |
| Death Comes to Venice | Johannes Grieser | Alwara Höfels, Christopher Schärf, Leonardo Nigro, Julia Stemberger | Mystery thriller | German-Austrian co-production |
| The Death of My Mother | Jessica Krummacher | Elsie de Brauw, Birte Schnöink | Drama | a.k.a. Zum Tod meiner Mutter |
| Du sollst hören | Petra Katharina Wagner | Claudia Michelsen, Anne Zander, Benjamin Piwko, Kai Wiesinger | Drama | a.k.a. Hear This |
| Echo | Mareike Wegener | Valery Tscheplanowa, Ursula Werner, Andreas Döhler | Crime | |
| Einsatz in den Alpen – Der Armbrustkiller | Ralph Polinski | Jochen Matschke | Thriller | German-Austrian co-production |
| Everybody Wants to Be Loved | Katharina Woll | Anne Ratte-Polle, Ulrike Willenbacher | Drama | a.k.a. Alle wollen geliebt werden |
| Familienerbe | Holger Haase | Ulrike C. Tscharre, Christina Hecke, Ivy Quainoo, Torben Liebrecht, Lucas Prisor, Anne-Marie Lux | Comedy | |
| Family Affairs | Sönke Wortmann | Iris Berben, Florian David Fitz, Christoph Maria Herbst | Comedy | a.k.a. Der Nachname |
| For Jojo | Barbara Ott | Caro Cult, Nina Gummich | Drama | Released by Netflix |
| The Forger | Maggie Peren | Louis Hofmann, Luna Wedler, Jonathan Berlin, Nina Gummich, André Jung | War | a.k.a. Der Passfälscher |
| The Fox | Adrian Goiginger | Simon Morzé, Adriane Gradziel, Karl Markovics | War | Austrian-German co-production |
| Die Geschichte der Menschheit - leicht gekürzt | Erik Haffner | Christoph Maria Herbst, Bastian Pastewka, Carolin Kebekus, Max Giermann, Christian Tramitz, Rick Kavanian | Comedy | |
| Grand Jeté | Isabelle Stever | Sarah Nevada Grether, Emil von Schönfels | Drama | |
| The Grump: In Search of an Escort | Mika Kaurismäki | Heikki Kinnunen, Kari Väänänen, Rosalie Thomass | Comedy | Finnish-German co-production |
| Guglhupfgeschwader | Ed Herzog | Sebastian Bezzel, Simon Schwarz, Lisa Maria Potthoff, Eisi Gulp, Sigi Zimmerschied | Crime comedy | |
| Heinrich Vogeler | Marie Noëlle | Florian Lukas, Anna Maria Mühe, Alice Dwyer, Johann von Bülow | Biography | |
| High Spirits | Sabine Derflinger | Désirée Nosbusch, Leslie Malton, Suzanne von Borsody, Rainer Bock | Drama | a.k.a. Süßer Rausch |
| The Hippocratic Silence | Esther Gronenborn | Julia Jentsch, Kostja Ullmann | Thriller | a.k.a. Das weiße Schweigen |
| Honecker und der Pastor | Jan Josef Liefers | Edgar Selge, Hans-Uwe Bauer, Steffi Kühnert | Comedy | |
| Human Flowers of Flesh | Helena Wittmann | Angeliki Papoulia | Drama | German-French co-production |
| Hunting Season | Aron Lehmann | Rosalie Thomass, Almila Bagriacik | Comedy | Remake of Hunting Season (2019) |
| In a Land That No Longer Exists | Aelrun Goette | Marlene Burow, Sabin Tambrea, David Schütter | Drama | |
| In the Wrong Hands | Mark Monheim | Katharina Schlothauer, Pegah Ferydoni, Florian Stetter | Thriller | |
| JGA: Jasmin. Gina. Anna. | Alireza Golafshan | Luise Heyer, Taneshia Abt, Teresa Rizos, Dimitrij Schaad, Axel Stein | Comedy | |
| Just Something Nice | Karoline Herfurth | Karoline Herfurth, Nora Tschirner, Aaron Altaras, Herbert Knaup | Comedy | a.k.a. Einfach mal was Schönes |
| Der Kaiser | Tim Trageser | Klaus Steinbacher | Biography, Sport | a.k.a. Franz Beckenbauer |
| Kalt | Stephan Lacant | Franziska Hartmann | Drama | |
| The Kangaroo Conspiracy | Marc-Uwe Kling, Alexander Berner | Dimitrij Schaad, Rosalie Thomass, Benno Fürmann | Comedy, Fantasy | |
| Ein Leben lang | Till Endemann | Henry Hübchen, Corinna Kirchhoff | Drama | |
| Lehrer kann jeder! | Ingo Rasper | Christoph Maria Herbst | Comedy | a.k.a. Anyone Can Teach! |
| Light in a Dark House | Lars-Gunnar Lotz | Henry Hübchen, Victoria Trauttmansdorff, Lucas Reiber | Thriller | |
| The Limit Is Just Me | Markus Weinberg, Steffi Rostoski | Jonas Deichmann | Documentary | |
| Locked-in Society | Sönke Wortmann | Florian David Fitz, Anke Engelke, Justus von Dohnányi, Nilam Farooq | Comedy | a.k.a. Eingeschlossene Gesellschaft |
| Love Thing | Anika Decker | Elyas M'Barek, Lucie Heinze, Peri Baumeister, Alexandra Maria Lara, Denis Moschitto, Maren Kroymann | Comedy | a.k.a. Liebesdings |
| The Magic Flute | Florian Sigl | Jack Wolfe, Iwan Rheon, Niamh McCormack, Asha Banks, Morris Robinson, F. Murray Abraham | Music | |
| Martha Liebermann: A Stolen Life | Stefan Bühling | Thekla Carola Wied, Lana Cooper, Franz Hartwig, Fritzi Haberlandt, Rüdiger Vogler | War, Biography | |
| Meine Freundin Volker | Piotr J. Lewandowski | Axel Milberg | Comedy | |
| Mittagsstunde | Lars Jessen | Charly Hübner, Rainer Bock, Gro Swantje Kohlhof | Drama | |
| Miyama, Kyoto Prefecture | Rainer Komers | Uwe Walter | Documentary | German-Japanese co-production |
| More Than Ever | Emily Atef | Vicky Krieps, Gaspard Ulliel, Bjørn Floberg | Drama | French-German-Luxembourgian-Norwegian co-production |
| Mother | Carolin Schmitz | Anke Engelke | Drama | |
| My Fairy Troublemaker | Caroline Origer | —N/a | Animated film | German-Luxembourgian co-production |
| Nazi Hunters | Raymond Ley | Franz Hartwig | Docudrama, War | |
| Old People | Andy Fetscher | Melika Foroutan, Stephan Luca, Paul Faßnacht | Horror | Released by Netflix |
| The Ordinaries | Sophie Linnenbaum | Fine Sendel, Jule Böwe, Pasquale Aleardi | Science fiction | |
| Ordinary Men: The "Forgotten Holocaust" | Manfred Oldenburg, Oliver Halmburger | | Documentary, War | |
| Orphea in Love | Axel Ranisch | Mirjam Mesak, Guido Badalamenti, Ursina Lardi | Music | |
| Oskars Kleid | Hüseyin Tabak | Florian David Fitz, Senta Berger, Burghart Klaußner, Kida Khodr Ramadan | Drama | |
| Over & Out | Julia Becker | Jessica Schwarz, Petra Schmidt-Schaller, Julia Becker, Nora Tschirner, Denis Moschitto, Axel Stein | Drama | a.k.a. Over and Out |
| The Path | Tobias Wiemann | Julius Weckauf, Nonna Cardoner | War | German-Spanish co-production |
| The Pool | Doris Dörrie | Andrea Sawatzki, Nilam Farooq | Comedy | a.k.a. Freibad |
| The Privilege | Felix Fuchssteiner, Katharina Schöde | Max Schimmelpfennig, Lea van Acken, Tijan Marei, Roman Knižka, Nadeshda Brennicke | Horror | Released by Netflix |
| Rabiye Kurnaz vs. George W. Bush | Andreas Dresen | Meltem Kaptan, Alexander Scheer | Drama | |
| Ramstein: The Pierced Heart | Kai Wessel | Max Hubacher, Trystan Pütter, Elisa Schlott | Disaster | a.k.a. Ramstein – Das durchstoßene Herz |
| Rhinegold | Fatih Akin | Emilio Sakraya | Crime | |
| Riesending – Jede Stunde zählt | Jochen Alexander Freydank | Maximilian Brückner, Verena Altenberger, Anna Brüggemann, Sabine Timoteo, Beat Marti, Christoph Bach | Drama | German-Swiss-Austrian co-production |
| The Robber Hotzenplotz | Michael Krummenacher | Nicholas Ofczarek, August Diehl, Christiane Paul, Olli Dittrich | Family | German-Swiss co-production |
| Rückkehr nach Rimini | Sarah Winkenstette | Rainer Bock, Karl Fischer, Bernhard Schütz, Lena Stolze, Miriam Maertens, Enzo Salomone, Giorgio Gobbi, Bruno Bilotta | Drama | a.k.a. Back to Rimini |
| Rumspringa | Mira Thiel | Jonas Holdenrieder, Timur Bartels | Comedy | Released by Netflix |
| Running | Rainer Kaufmann | Anna Schudt, Katharina Wackernagel, Maximilian Brückner, Gaby Dohm, Kai Schumann | Drama | a.k.a. Laufen |
| Sachertorte | Christine Rogoll | Max Hubacher, Maeve Metelka, Michaela Saba | Comedy | German-Austrian co-production. Released by Amazon Prime Video |
| School of Magical Animals 2 | Sven Unterwaldt | Lilith Johna, Nadja Uhl, Justus von Dohnányi, Milan Peschel | Family | a.k.a. The School of the Magical Animals 2 |
| Ein Schritt zum Abgrund | Alexander Dierbach | Petra Schmidt-Schaller, Florian Stetter, Valerie Huber | Drama | Remake of Doctor Foster, Series 1 (2015) |
| Shadows of the Past | Dominik Graf | Verena Altenberger, Alessandro Schuster, Florian Stetter, Judith Altenberger | Drama | a.k.a. Gesicht der Erinnerung |
| The Silent Forest | Saralisa Volm | Henriette Confurius, Noah Saavedra, Robert Stadlober, August Zirner | Thriller | a.k.a. Schweigend steht der Wald |
| Skin Deep | Alex Schaad | Jonas Dassler, Mala Emde, Maryam Zaree, Dimitrij Schaad, Edgar Selge | Science fiction | a.k.a. Aus meiner Haut |
| So Long Daddy, See You in Hell | Christopher Roth | Jana McKinnon, Clemens Schick, Leo Altaras, Julia Hummer, Hanns Zischler | Drama | a.k.a. Servus Papa, See You in Hell |
| The Social Experiment | Pascal Schröder | Marven Gabriel Suarez-Brinkert, Raffaela Kraus | Science fiction | |
| Der Spalter | Susanna Salonen | Axel Stein, Fabian Busch, Marlene Morreis | Comedy | a.k.a. The Divider |
| A Stasi Comedy | Leander Haußmann | David Kross, Henry Hübchen, Antonia Bill, Deleila Piasko, Jörg Schüttauf, Tom Schilling | Comedy | |
| Talking About the Weather | Annika Pinske | Anne Schäfer, Max Riemelt | Drama | a.k.a. Alle reden übers Wetter |
| Tár | Todd Field | Cate Blanchett, Nina Hoss | Drama | American-German co-production |
| A Thousand Lines | Michael Herbig | Elyas M'Barek, Jonas Nay | Drama | a.k.a. A 1000 Lines |
| Trügerische Sicherheit | Thomas Kronthaler | Max Simonischek, Christian Berkel, Friederike Becht | Drama | a.k.a. Illusion of Safety |
| Die Wannseekonferenz | Matti Geschonneck | Philipp Hochmair, Simon Schwarz, Godehard Giese | Docudrama, War | a.k.a. The Conference |
| We Are Next of Kin | Hans-Christian Schmid | Claude Heinrich, Adina Vetter | Drama | a.k.a. Wir sind dann wohl die Angehörigen |
| We Might as Well Be Dead | Natalia Sinelnikova | Ioana Iacob | Science fiction | |
| Weil wir Champions sind | Christoph Schnee | Wotan Wilke Möhring | Comedy, Sport | a.k.a. Because We Are Champions. Remake of Champions (2018) |
| What You Can See from Here | Aron Lehmann | Luna Wedler, Corinna Harfouch, Karl Markovics, Rosalie Thomass, Hansi Jochmann, Peter Schneider | Drama | |
| Who Buries the Undertaker? | Andreas Schmidbauer, Tanja Schmidbauer | Tom Kreß, Angelika Sedlmeier, David Zimmerschied | Comedy | a.k.a. Wer gräbt den Bestatter ein? |
| Why Chickens Don't Fly | Naira Cavero Orihuel | Lena Schmidtke, Paula Kober | Drama | a.k.a. Wut auf Kuba |
| Das Wunder von Kapstadt | Franziska Buch | Alexander Scheer, Loyiso Macdonald, Sonja Gerhardt, Fritz Karl | Historical drama | |
| Wunderschön | Karoline Herfurth | Nora Tschirner, Martina Gedeck, Karoline Herfurth | Comedy | a.k.a. Beautiful |
| You Will Not Have My Hate | Kilian Riedhof | Pierre Deladonchamps | Drama | French-German-Belgian co-production |

== 2023 ==
List of German films of 2023 (Cinema Releases in Chronological Order)

| Title | Director | Cast | Genre | Notes |
|---|---|---|---|---|
| 15 Years | Chris Kraus | Hannah Herzsprung, Albrecht Schuch, Hassan Akkouch | Drama, Music | a.k.a. Fifteen Years |
| 791 km | Tobi Baumann | Iris Berben, Joachim Król, Nilam Farooq | Drama | |
| Afire | Christian Petzold | Thomas Schubert, Paula Beer, Langston Uibel, Enno Trebs, Matthias Brandt | Drama | a.k.a. Roter Himmel |
| Alaska | Max Gleschinski | Christina Große, Pegah Ferydoni | Drama | |
| Anselm | Wim Wenders | Anselm Kiefer | Documentary | |
| Das Beste kommt noch! | Til Schweiger | Til Schweiger, Michael Maertens | Comedy | Remake of The Best Is Yet to Come (2019) |
| Black Box | Aslı Özge | Luise Heyer, Christian Berkel, Manal Issa, Inka Friedrich, Anna Brüggemann, Marc Zinga, Sascha Alexander Geršak | Drama | |
| Blind at Heart | Barbara Albert | Mala Emde, Max von der Groeben, Thomas Prenn | Drama | a.k.a. Die Mittagsfrau. German-Swiss-Luxembourgian co-production |
| Blindspot | Hannu Salonen | Klaus Steinbacher, Marlene Tanczik, Felicitas Woll | Thriller | |
| Blood & Gold | Peter Thorwarth | Robert Maaser, Alexander Scheer, Marie Hacke, Jördis Triebel | War | a.k.a. Blood and Gold. Released by Netflix |
| Bones and Names | Fabian Stumm | Fabian Stumm, Knut Berger, Marie-Lou Sellem | Drama | |
| Boy Kills World | Moritz Mohr | Bill Skarsgård, Jessica Rothe, Michelle Dockery, Andrew Koji, Famke Janssen, Yayan Ruhian | Action, Science fiction | American-German-South African co-production |
| Clashing Differences | Merle Grimme | Thelma Buabeng, Minh-Khai Phan-Thi, Jane Chirwa, Safak Sengül | Drama | |
| The Dark Girl | Enrico Saller | Katharina Scheuba, Philippe Brenninkmeyer | Thriller | German-Austrian co-production |
| Das bleibt unter uns | Verena S. Freytag | Anna Unterberger, Hanno Koffler | Drama | a.k.a. Between You and Me |
| Dead Girls Dancing | Anna Roller | Katharina Stark, Luna Jordan, Noemi Liv Nicolaisen | Drama | German-French co-production |
| Defending the Caveman | Laura Lackmann | Moritz Bleibtreu | Comedy | a.k.a. Caveman |
| Demminer Chants | Hans-Jürgen Syberberg | | Documentary | |
| The Dive | Maximilian Erlenwein | Sophie Lowe, Louisa Krause | Thriller | German-Maltese co-production. Remake of Breaking Surface (2020) |
| Drifter | Hannes Hirsch | Lorenz Hochhuth | Drama | |
| Eher fliegen hier UFOs | Ingo Haeb, Gina Wenzel | Johanna Gastdorf | Drama | a.k.a. More Likely that UFOs Will Fly Here |
| Elaha | Milena Aboyan | Bayan Layla | Drama | |
| Empty Nets | Behrooz Karamizade | Hamid Reza Abbasi, Sadaf Asgari | Drama | Iranian-German co-production |
| Falling into Place | Aylin Tezel | Aylin Tezel, Chris Fulton, Rory Fleck-Byrne, Juliet Cowan, Alexandra Dowling, Olwen Fouéré, Samuel Anderson | Drama | German-British co-production |
| Faraway | Vanessa Jopp | Naomi Krauss, Goran Bogdan | Romantic comedy | Released by Netflix |
| Ein Fest fürs Leben | Richard Huber | Christoph Maria Herbst | Comedy | Remake of C'est la vie! (2017) |
| The Flood – Death on the Dike | Andreas Prochaska | Anton Spieker, Philine Schmölzer, Sascha Alexander Geršak, Detlev Buck | Drama | |
| Flunkyball | Alexander Adolph | Lena Klenke, Laurids Schürmann, Silke Bodenbender, Fabian Hinrichs, Lisa Kreuzer | Drama | |
| The Flying Classroom | Carolina Hellsgård | Tom Schilling, Trystan Pütter, Hannah Herzsprung, Jördis Triebel | Family | |
| Franky Five Star | Birgit Möller | Lena Urzendowsky | Fantasy | |
| Girl You Know It's True | Simon Verhoeven | Tijan Njie, Elan Ben Ali, Matthias Schweighöfer, Bella Dayne | Biography, Music | German-American French-South African co-production |
| Gondola | Veit Helmer | Mathilde Irrmann, Nino Soselia | Comedy | German-Georgian co-production |
| Hard Feelings | Granz Henman | Tobias Schäfer, Cosima Henman, Axel Stein, Diana Amft | Comedy | a.k.a. Hammerharte Jungs. Released by Netflix |
| Hollywoodgate | Ibrahim Nash'at | | Documentary | German-American co-production |
| Home Sweet Home: Where Evil Lives | Thomas Sieben | Nilam Farooq, David Kross, Justus von Dohnányi | Horror | |
| Ich bin! Margot Friedländer | Raymond Ley | Julia Anna Grob | Docudrama, War | |
| In the Blind Spot | Ayşe Polat | Katja Bürkle, Ahmet Varlı, Çağla Yurga, Aybi Era | Thriller | a.k.a. Im toten Winkel |
| Ingeborg Bachmann – Journey into the Desert | Margarethe von Trotta | Vicky Krieps, Ronald Zehrfeld | Biography | |
| Inside | Vasilis Katsoupis | Willem Dafoe | Thriller | Greek-German-Belgian co-production |
| Kidnapped: 14 Days of Survival | Marc Rothemund | Sonja Gerhardt, Torben Liebrecht, Cecilio Andresen | Crime | a.k.a. Kidnapped: 14 Days Survival |
| Lost in Athens | Roland Suso Richter | Silke Bodenbender, Yousef Sweid | Thriller | a.k.a. Spurlos in Athen |
| Luise | Matthias Luthardt | Luise Aschenbrenner, Christa Théret, Leonard Kunz | Drama | German-French co-production |
| Das Mädchen von früher | Lena Knauss | Nina Kunzendorf, Godehard Giese, Steffi Kühnert, André Hennicke | Crime | a.k.a. The Girl from Before |
| Manta, Manta: Legacy | Til Schweiger | Til Schweiger | Comedy | a.k.a. Manta Manta – Zwoter Teil |
| Measures of Men | Lars Kraume | Leonard Scheicher, Girley Jazama | Drama | a.k.a. A Place in the Sun a.k.a. Der vermessene Mensch |
| Mein Vater, der Esel und ich | Imogen Kimmel | Günther Maria Halmer, Isabell Polak | Comedy | |
| The Million Robbery | Lars Becker | Karim Ben Mansur, Anica Dobra, Anja Kling | Crime | a.k.a. The 8 Million Heist |
| Mission: School of Fun | Ekrem Ergün | Serkan Kaya, Felicitas Woll, Max Giermann, Oliver Korittke | Comedy | a.k.a. Die unlangweiligste Schule der Welt |
| Monster im Kopf | Christina Ebelt | Franziska Hartmann | Crime drama | |
| Mordach: Death in the Mountains | Roland Suso Richter | Mehmet Kurtuluş, Sarah Bauerett, Dominique Horwitz, Gesine Cukrowski | Crime | |
| More Than Strangers | Sylvie Michel | Cyril Gueï, Smaragda Karydi, Julie Kieffer, Samuel Schneider, Léo Daudin | Drama | |
| Music | Angela Schanelec | Aliocha Schneider, Agathe Bonitzer | Drama | German-French-Serbian co-production |
| My Falcon | Dominik Graf | Anne Ratte-Polle | Drama | |
| Nach uns der Rest der Welt | Franziska Buch | Julius Gause, Lina Hüesker, Anneke Kim Sarnau, Sophie von Kessel, Florian Stetter | Drama | a.k.a. After Us, the Rest of the World |
| Der neue Freund | Dustin Loose | Corinna Harfouch, Karin Hanczewski, Louis Nitsche | Drama | |
| Nichts, was uns passiert | Julia C. Kaiser | Emma Drogunova, Gustav Schmidt | Drama | |
| The Night Between Us | Abini Gold | Laura Balzer, Aaron Altaras, Paul Boche | Drama | a.k.a. Zwischen uns die Nacht |
| On Mothers and Daughters | Tanja Egen | Friederike Becht | Drama | a.k.a. Geranien |
| One for the Road | Markus Goller | Frederick Lau, Nora Tschirner, Burak Yiğit, Friederike Becht, Godehard Giese, Nina Kunzendorf | Drama | |
| One Last Evening | Lukas Nathrath | Sebastian Jakob Doppelbauer, Pauline Werner | Comedy | a.k.a. Letzter Abend |
| Paradise | Boris Kunz | Kostja Ullmann, Iris Berben, Alina Levshin, Lisa-Marie Koroll, Marlene Tanczik, Corinna Kirchhoff, Lisa Loven Kongsli, Lucas Lynggaard Tønnesen | Science fiction | Released by Netflix |
| The Peacock | Lutz Heineking Jr. | Jürgen Vogel, Annette Frier, Lavinia Wilson, Tom Schilling, David Kross, Victoria Carling, Philip Jackson, Svenja Jung | Comedy | |
| Perfect Days | Wim Wenders | Koji Yakusho | Drama | Japanese-German co-production |
| Ein Regenbogen zu Weihnachten | Esther Gronenborn | Jasmin Gerat, Maximilian Brückner | Comedy | |
| Rehragout-Rendezvous | Ed Herzog | Sebastian Bezzel, Simon Schwarz, Lisa Maria Potthoff, Eisi Gulp, Sigi Zimmerschied | Crime comedy | |
| Remember Me | Rainer Kaufmann | Senta Berger, Günther Maria Halmer | Comedy | a.k.a. Weißt du noch |
| Salty Water | Henrika Kull | Liliane Amuat, Dor Aloni | Drama | a.k.a. Südsee |
| Schlamassel | Sylke Enders | Mareike Beykirch | Drama | |
| Schock | Denis Moschitto, Daniel Rakete Siegel | Denis Moschitto, Fahri Yardım, Aenne Schwarz, Daniel Wiemer, Anke Engelke | Crime | a.k.a. Shock |
| Seneca – On the Creation of Earthquakes | Robert Schwentke | John Malkovich | Biography | |
| Silver and the Book of Dreams | Helena Hufnagel | Jana McKinnon, Riva Krymalowski, Chaneil Kular, Nicolette Krebitz | Fantasy | Released by Amazon Prime Video |
| Sisi & I | Frauke Finsterwalder | Susanne Wolff, Sandra Hüller, Stefan Kurt, Tom Rhys Harries | Biography | a.k.a. Sisi and I. German-Swiss-Austrian co-production |
| Someday We'll Tell Each Other Everything | Emily Atef | Marlene Burow, Felix Kramer | Drama | |
| Sophia, Death and Me | Charly Hübner | Dimitrij Schaad, Anna Maria Mühe, Marc Hosemann, Johanna Gastdorf, Carlo Ljubek | Comedy, Fantasy | |
| Stella. A Life. | Kilian Riedhof | Paula Beer, Jannis Niewöhner, Katja Riemann | War, Drama | |
| Die stillen Mörder | Till Endemann | Milena Tscharntke, Franz Hartwig | Crime | |
| Sun and Concrete | David Wnendt | Levy Rico Arcos, Vincent Wiemer, Rafael Luis Klein-Hessling, Aaron Maldonado Morales | Crime | |
| Talk to Me | Janin Halisch | Alina Stiegler, Barbara Philipp, Peter Lohmeyer | Drama | a.k.a. Sprich mit mir |
| Tamara | Jonas Walter | Linda Pöppel, Lina Wendel | Drama | |
| The Teachers' Lounge | İlker Çatak | Leonie Benesch | Drama | a.k.a. Das Lehrerzimmer |
| The Three Investigators and The Legacy of the Dragon | Tim Dünschede | Julius Weckauf, Nevio Wendt, Levi Brandl, Gudrun Landgrebe, Gedeon Burkhard, Mark Waschke, Florian Lukas, Jördis Triebel | Family, Mystery | a.k.a. The Three Investigators and The Dragon's Legacy |
| Till the End of the Night | Christoph Hochhäusler | Timocin Ziegler, Thea Ehre | Thriller | |
| Trauzeugen | Lena May Graf, Finn Christoph Stroeks | Edin Hasanović, Almila Bagriacik, Kurt Krömer, Iris Berben | Comedy | |
| Trunk: Locked In | Marc Schießer | Sina Martens | Thriller | Released by Amazon Prime Video |
| Unbestechlich | Christiane Balthasar | Michael Klammer, Samia Chancrin | Thriller | a.k.a. Incorruptible |
| The Uncertainty Principle of Love | Lars Kraume | Caroline Peters, Burghart Klaußner | Comedy | a.k.a. The Intangible Joy of Love |
| The Universal Theory | Timm Kröger | Jan Bülow, Olivia Ross, Hanns Zischler, David Bennent | Mystery | a.k.a. Die Theorie von Allem. German-Swiss-Austrian co-production |
| Unschuldig – Der Fall Julia B. | Ute Wieland | Emily Cox, Thomas Loibl, Katharina Marie Schubert | Crime | Remake of Innocent, Series 2 (2021) |
| Unsichtbarer Angreifer | Martina Plura | Emily Cox, Denis Moschitto | Thriller | |
| We Have a Deal | Felicitas Korn | Felix Klare, Patricia Aulitzky, Peter Lohmeyer | Drama | a.k.a. Wir haben einen Deal |
| Weekend Rebels | Marc Rothemund | Florian David Fitz, Cecilio Andresen, Aylin Tezel, Joachim Król | Comedy | |
| When Will It Be Again Like It Never Was Before | Sonja Heiss | Devid Striesow, Laura Tonke, Arsseni Bultmann, Merlin Rose | Drama | |
| Die Whistleblowerin | Elmar Fischer | Katharina Nesytowa, Artjom Gilz, Jennifer Ulrich | Spy thriller | |
| Who Will Feed the Rabbit? | Tim Trageser | Teresa Rizos, Axel Stein, Shadi Hedayati, Michaela May | Drama | a.k.a. Wer füttert den Hasen? |
| A Whole Life | Hans Steinbichler | Stefan Gorski, August Zirner, Julia Franz Richter, Robert Stadlober, Marianne Sägebrecht | Drama | German-Austrian co-production |
| Willie and Me | Eva Hassmann | Eva Hassmann, Willie Nelson, Peter Bogdanovich, Thure Riefenstein | Comedy | American-German co-production |
| Wolfsjagd | Jakob Ziemnicki | Maria Simon, Jacob Matschenz, Jörg Schüttauf | Crime | |
| Wolfswinkel | Ruth Olshan | Annett Sawallisch, Claudia Eisinger, Alina Levshin, Jörg Schüttauf | Drama | |
| Zwei Weihnachtsmänner sind einer zu viel | Neelesha Barthel | Joachim Król, Rainer Bock | Comedy | |
| Zwischen uns | Max Fey | Liv Lisa Fries, Jona Eisenblätter, Thure Lindhardt | Drama | |

== 2024 ==
List of German films of 2024 (Cinema Releases in Chronological Order)

== 2025 ==
List of German films of 2025 (Cinema Releases in Chronological Order)
