= List of German films =

This is a list of the most notable films produced in German cinema.

For an alphabetical list of articles on German films see Category:German films.

== 1895–1945 ==
=== German Empire ===
- List of German films of 1895–1918 (German Empire)

=== Weimar Germany ===
- List of German films of 1919–1932 (Weimar Germany)
- 1919
- 1920
- 1921
- 1922
- 1923
- 1924
- 1925
- 1926
- 1927
- 1928
- 1929
- 1930
- 1931
- 1932

=== Nazi Germany ===
- List of German films of 1933–1945 (Nazi Germany)
- 1933
- 1934
- 1935
- 1936
- 1937
- 1938
- 1939
- 1940
- 1941
- 1942
- 1943
- 1944
- 1945

== 1945–1989 ==
- List of East German films from the 1949–1990 German Democratic Republic

In 1949, both the Federal Republic of Germany (West Germany) and the German Democratic Republic (East Germany) came into existence, in 1990 they reunited as the Federal Republic, again informally referred to as simply Germany.

Because of the impact of the Second World War, and restrictions imposed on the country by the Allied Powers, film production between 1945 and 1948 was limited and did not pick up really until after 1950. See also Category:West German films

- List of German films of 1945–1949
- List of German films of the 1950s
- 1950
- 1951
- 1952
- 1953
- 1954
- 1955
- 1956
- 1957
- 1958
- 1959
- List of German films of the 1960s
- 1960
- 1961
- 1962
- 1963
- 1964
- 1965
- 1966
- 1967
- 1968
- 1969
- List of German films of the 1970s
- List of German films of the 1980s
- List of German films of the 1990s

== 2000s–present ==
- List of German films of the 2000s
- List of German films of the 2010s
  - List of German films of 2014
- List of German films of the 2020s
  - List of German films of 2023
  - List of German films of 2024
  - List of German films of 2025

== See also ==
- List of German-language films
- List of years in Germany
- List of years in German television
