= List of German films of 2023 =

This is a list of German films that were released in 2023.

| Opening | English Title | Native Title | Director | Cast | Studio | Ref. |
|---|---|---|---|---|---|---|
| Jan 12 | Mission Ulja Funk | Mission Ulja Funk | Barbara Kronenberg | Romy Lou Janinhoff, Jonas Oeßel, Hildegard Schroedter | Farb Film | |
| Jan 26 | Caveman (2023 film) | Caveman | Laura Lackmann | Moritz Bleibtreu, Laura Tonke, Wotan Wilke Möhring, Martina Hill | Constantin Film | |
| Jan 26 | The Three Investigators: Legacy of the Dragon | Die drei ??? – Erbe des Drachen | Tim Dünschede | Julius Weckauf, Nevio Wendt, Levi Brandl | Sony Pictures | |
| Feb 2 | Skin Deep | Aus meiner Haut | Alex Schaad | Jonas Dassler, Mala Emde | X Verleih | |
| Feb 23 | When Will It Be Again Like It Never Was Before | Wann wird es endlich wieder so, wie es nie war | Sonja Heiss | Arsseni Bultmann, Laura Tonke, Devid Striesow | Warner Bros. Pictures | |
| Mar 9 | Der Pfau | Der Pfau | Lutz Heineking junior | Lavinia Wilson, Serkan Kaya, Tom Schilling, David Kross, Jürgen Vogel, Svenja Jung, Annette Frier | Tobis Film GmbH | |
| Mar 23 | Measures of Men | Der vermessene Mensch | Lars Kraume | Leonard Scheicher, Girley Charlene Jazama, Peter Simonischek | Zero one film GmbH | |
| Mar 23 | Seneca – On the Creation of Earthquakes | Seneca – Oder: Über die Geburt von Erdbeben | Robert Schwentke | John Malkovich | Filmgalerie 451 | |
| Mar 30 | Manta, Manta: Legacy | Manta, Manta – Zwoter Teil | Til Schweiger | Til Schweiger, Tina Ruland, Michael Kessler, Moritz Bleibtreu | Constantin Film | |
| Mar 30 | Sisi & I | Sisi & Ich | Frauke Finsterwalder | Susanne Wolff, Sandra Hüller | DCM Film Distribution | |
| Mar 30 | The Ordinaries | The Ordinaries | Sophie Linnenbaum | Jule Böwe, Henning Peker | Notsold | |
| Apr 13 | Someday We'll Tell Each Other Everything | Irgendwann werden wir uns alles erzählen | Emily Atef | Marlene Burow and Felix Kramer | Rohfilm Factory GmbH | |
| Apr 20 | Afire | Roter Himmel | Christian Petzold | Thomas Schubert, Paula Beer, Langston Uibel | Schramm Film Koerner Weber Kaiser | |
| Jul 6 | Till the End of the Night | Bis ans Ende der Nacht | Christoph Hochhäusler | Timocin Ziegler, Thea Ehrlich, Michael Sideris | Heimatfilm GmbH + Co KG | |
| Aug 10 | Rehragout-Rendezvous | Rehragout-Rendezvous | Ed Herzog | Sebastian Bezzel, Simon Schwarz, Lisa Maria Potthoff | Constantin Film | |
| Aug 24 | Wild Heart | Ponyherz – Wild und frei | Markus Dietrich | Sophie Lutz, Christoph Letkowski | Plaion Pictures | |
| Sep 14 | Trauzeugen | Trauzeugen | Finn Christoph Stroeks & Lena May Graf | Almila Bagriacik, Edin Hasanović | Paramount Pictures | |

== See also ==
- 2023 in Germany
