= Thelma Buabeng =

German actress

- Born: Thelma; 31 March 1981 (age 45); Ghana
- Other name: Buabeng
- Citizenship: Ghana Germany
- Education: St. Joseph Gymnasium in Rheinbach
- Occupation: Actress
- Known for: Acting

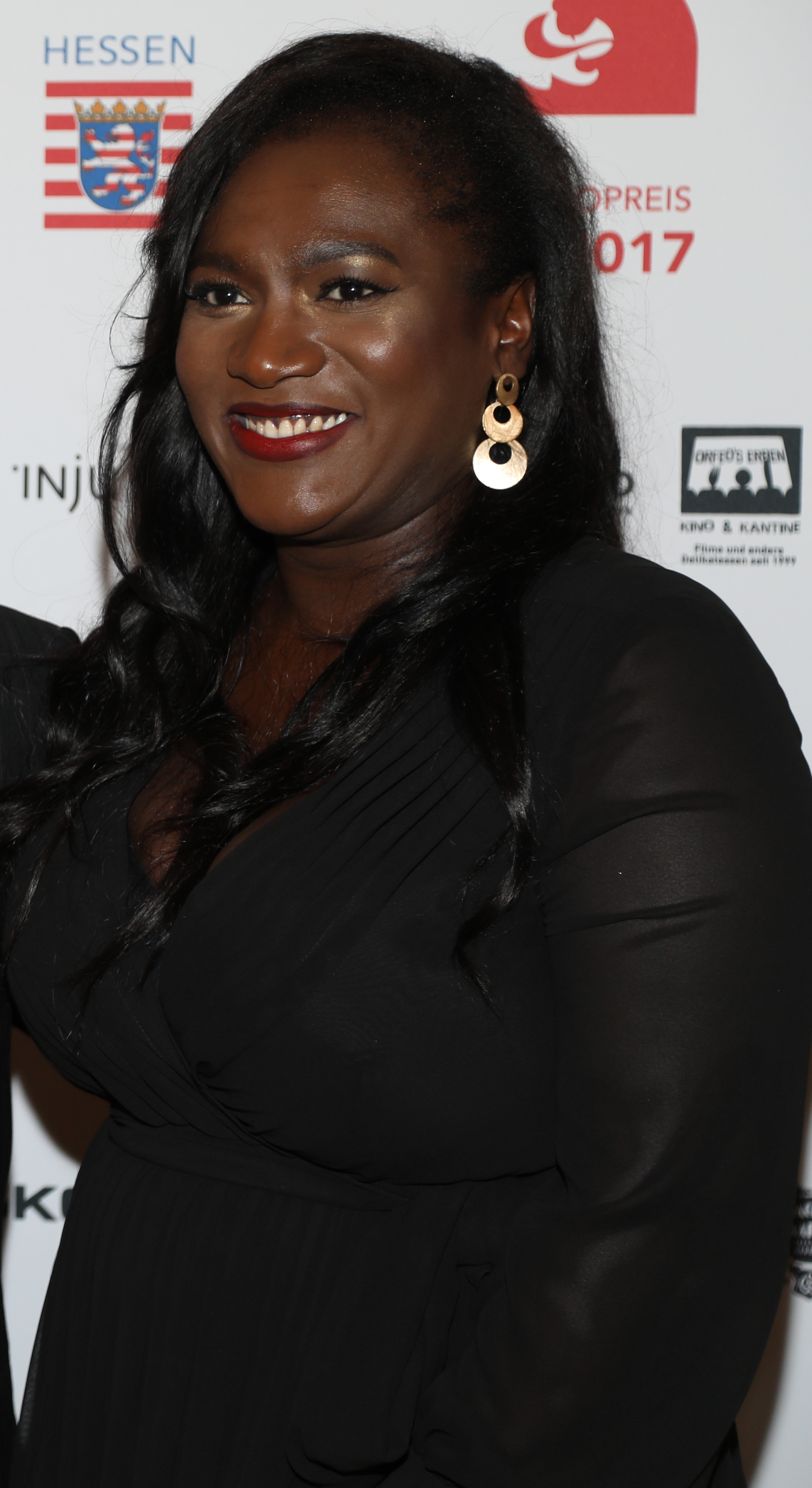
Image of Thelma Buabeng

Thelma Buabeng (born 31 March 1981 in Ghana) is a German actress.

== Life ==
Thelma Buabeng grew up with two siblings in Meckenheim (Rhineland), where her family moved to from Ghana in 1984. She passed her high school diploma at the St. Joseph Gymnasium in Rheinbach; She then studied media marketing at the West German Academy of Communications in Cologne. Buabeng began her acting career in 1996 with the theater group "Junge Bühne Brotfabrik" in Bonn. After attending drama school in Cologne's "Theater der Keller" for two years, she moved to Berlin in 2005, where in 2009 she completed her acting training at the Filmschauspielschule Berlin. In 2003, she celebrated her television debut in the ARD series Lindenstraße. Thereafter, Thelma Buabeng was seen in inter alia, Der Kriminalist (TV), The Adventures of Huck Finn (cinema) and several other scenes.

After further film and television work, including in the ZDF multi-part Hotel Adlon: A Family Saga (TV), bestefreunde, Punk Berlin 1982 (cinema) and Heil (cinema), Thelma Buabeng launched her own comedy project Tell Me Nothing From The Horse in 2016 in addition to her acting career (formerly 3 Sistas since 2009).

Buabeng is seen on various theatrical stages, such as Die Schutzbefohlenen at the Thalia Theater in Hamburg, 2014; Meteorites at the Maxim Gorki Theater in Berlin, 2016; Faust, Volksbühne on Rosa-Luxemburg-Platz, 2017 and Frank Castorf's Les Misérables at the Berliner Ensemble.

== Filmography (selection) ==
- 2003: Lindenstraße (4 Episodes, Director: Kerstin Krause)
- 2006: Berlin Bohème (8 Episodes)
- 2010: Wenn Bäume Puppen tragen (short film Director: Ismail Sahin)
- 2011: Der Kriminalist – Unter Druck (Director: Hannu Salonen)
- 2012: Tatort – Ihr Kinderlein kommet (Director: Thomas Jauch)
- 2012: The Adventures of Huck Finn (Director: Hermine Huntgeburth)
- 2013: Hotel Adlon: A Family Saga (Director: Uli Edel)
- 2014: Ein Sommer in Amsterdam (Director: Karola Meeder)
- 2015: Dora oder die sexuellen Neurosen unserer Eltern (Director: Stina Werenfels)
- 2014: bestefreunde (Director: Jonas Grosch)
- 2014: ... und dann kam Wanda (Director: Holger Haase)
- 2015: Tatort – Verbrannt (Director: Thomas Stuber)
- 2015: Punk Berlin 1982 (Director: Oskar Roehler)
- 2015: Heil (Director: Dietrich Brüggemann)
- 2015: Kommissarin Heller – Schattenriss (Regie: Christiane Balthasar)
- 2016: Dating Alarm (Director: Holger Haase)
- 2016: Tatort – Narben (Director: Torsten C. Fischer)
- 2016: Nachtschicht – Ladies First (Director: Lars Becker)
- 2017: Jerks. – Hindenburg (Director: Christian Ulmen)
- 2017: Am Ruder (Director: Stephan Wagner)
- 2017: Unter deutschen Betten (Director: Jan Fehse)
- 2017: Hit Mom: Murderous Christmas (Director: Sebastian Marka)
- 2018: Echte Bauern singen besser
