= Until Nothing Remains =

2010 German television film about Scientology

- Written by: Niki Stein
- Directed by: Niki Stein
- Starring: Silke Bodenbender; Felix Klare; Nina Kunzendorf
- Country of origin: Germany
- Original language: German

Production
- Running time: 89 minutes
- Budget: 2,350,000€

Original release
- Network: ARD
- Release: 31 March 2010

Until Nothing Remains (German: Bis nichts mehr bleibt) is a German television film depicting a story about Scientology and its effects upon converts. In the film, a young couple are brought into Scientology by means of manipulation. "Eventually, the husband decides to leave the group, losing not only his wife in the process, but also his young child and a big portion of his family's inheritance, which his wife has donated to the church." The film is reportedly based on the real-life experiences of a German man named Heiner von Rönn.

It was reported that the Church of Scientology opposed the release of the film, which aired Wednesday, March 31, 2010, on the German ARD public-television network.

According to German news magazine Der Spiegel, the broadcast was watched by "8.69 million viewers (market share of 27.1 percent)". Wednesday film ratings are "usually between four and six million viewers."

Scientology produced their own 40-minute interview film in response, which was made available on the Internet.
