= Naked Among Wolves (2015 film) =

2015 German drama film

- Based on: Naked Among Wolves by Bruno Apitz
- Screenplay by: Eugen Kogon; Stefan Kolditz
- Directed by: Philipp Kadelbach
- Starring: Florian Stetter; Peter Schneider
- Country of origin: Germany
- Original language: German

Production
- Producers: Benjamin Benedict; Nico Hofman; Verena Monben; Sebastian Werninger
- Cinematography: Kolja Brandt
- Editor: Bernd Schlegel

Original release
- Release: March 19, 2015

Naked Among Wolves (German: Nackt unter Wölfen), also released as The Camp, is a 2015 German drama film directed by Philipp Kadelbach. It is based on the 1958 novel of the same name by Bruno Apitz, which was published in 1958 in East Germany. Created for television, it is the third film version of the literary text after the 1963 version.

== Plot ==
The film takes place in the years 1944 and 1945 towards the end of World War II in the Buchenwald concentration camp. Prisoners in the Nazi concentration camp risk their lives by taking in a young Jewish boy rescued from a ghetto in Poland. The camp commandant hears about the boy and tightens up on the already cruelly treated prisoners. They whisk the boy away from being discovered, always staying one step ahead of the Nazi guards and the ireful commandant. The boy is eventually discovered and the prisoners who protected him now face certain death. They are freed by the Allies in a dramatic but altogether expected turn of events.

== Cast ==
- Florian Stetter - Hans Pippig
- Peter Schneider - André Höfel
- Sylvester Groth - Helmut Krämer
- Sabin Tambrea - Hermann Reineboth
- Robert Gallinowski - Robert Kluttig
- Rainer Bock - Alois Schwahl
- Rafael Stachowiak - Marian Kropinski
- Thorsten Merten - Hans Bochow
