= Ein Fest fürs Leben =

- Theatrical release poster
- Directed by: Richard Huber
- Written by: Richard Huber
- Produced by: Hermann Florin; Sabrina Kunert; Sebastian Werninger
- Starring: Christoph Maria Herbst; Cynthia Micas; Marc Hosemann; Jörg Schüttauf; Johannes Allmayer; Jasmin Shakeri
- Cinematography: Jörg Widmer
- Edited by: Knut Hake
- Music by: Francesco Wilking; Patrick Reising
- Production companies: UFA Fiction; Feine Filme; Warner Bros. Film Productions Germany
- Distributed by: Warner Bros. Pictures
- Release date: 19 October 2023
- Running time: 101 minutes
- Country: Germany
- Language: German
- Box office: $2.7 million

Ein Fest fürs Leben is a 2023 German comedy film written and directed by Richard Huber. It is a remake of the 2017 French film C'est la vie!. The film stars Christoph Maria Herbst, Cynthia Micas and Marc Hosemann.

It was released in Germany on 19 October 2023 by Warner Bros. Pictures.

== Cast ==
- Christoph Maria Herbst as Dieter
- Cynthia Micas as Jella
- Marc Hosemann as Steve
- Jörg Schüttauf as Marcel
- Johannes Allmayer as Florian
- Ulrich Brandhoff as Lasse
- Jasmin Shakeri as Ursel
- Anne Schäfer as Gitta
- Ben Münchow as Marvin
- Rainer Bock as Gabrielle Totti
- Pit Bukowski as Uwe
- Luise Befort as Miriam
- Charlotte Schwab as Gerlinde
- Ernst Stötzner as Volker
