= List of German films of 2024 =

This is a list of German films that were released in 2024.

| Opening | English Title | Native Title | Director | Cast | Studio | Ref. |
|---|---|---|---|---|---|---|
| January 19 | 60 minutes (film) | 60 Minuten | Oliver Kienle | Emilio Sakraya | Nocturna Productions | |
| January 25 | Stella. A Life. | Stella. Ein Leben. | Kilian Riedhof | Paula Beer | Letterbox Film Production | |
| March 8 | The Devil's Bath | Des Teufels Bad | Veronika Franz and Severin Fiala | Anja Plaschg, Maria Hofstätter | Ulrich Seidl film | |
| April 4 | Every You Every Me | Alle die Du bist | Michael Fetter Nathansky | Aenne Schwarz and Carlo Ljubek | Contando Films | |
| April 11 | Winners | Sieger sein | Soleen Yusef | Dileyla Agirman, Andreas Döhler | DCM Pictures | |
| April 25 | Dying | Sterben | Matthias Glasner | Corinna Harfouch, Lars Eidinger | Prince Film & Kultur Produktion | |
| July 18 | Scorched Earth | Verbrannte Erde | Thomas Arslan | Mišel Matičević, Alexander Fehling | Schramm Film Koerner | |
| September 26 | School of Magical Animals 3 | Die Schule der magischen Tiere 3 | Sven Unterwaldt | Nadja Uhl, Loris Sichrovsky | Leonine | |
| September 26 | Cuckoo | Cuckoo | Tilman Singer | Hunter Schafer, Dan Stevens, Jessica Henwick, Marton Csokas, Jan Bluthardt | Neon | |
| October 17 | From Hilde, With Love | In Liebe, Eure Hilde | Andreas Dresen | Liv Lisa Fries | Pandora Film Produktion | |
| October 31 | Riefenstahl | Riefenstahl | Andres Veiel | | Vincent Productions | |

== See also ==
- 2024 in Germany
- 2024 in film
- List of 2024 box office number-one films in Germany
- List of German films of 2023
