= Daniel Sträßer =

German actor

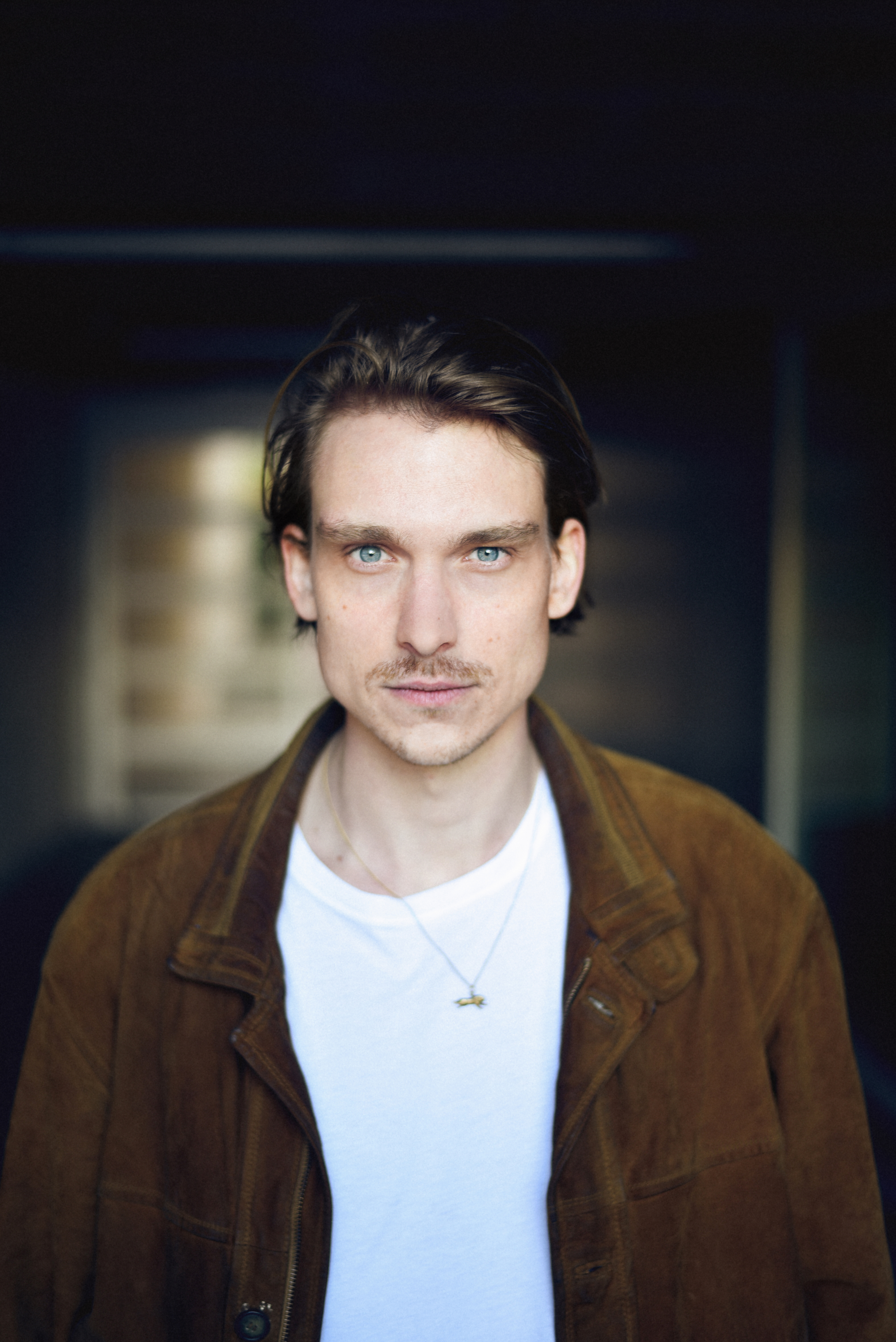
- Born: 18 July 1987 (age 39); Völklingen, West Germany
- Citizenship: Germany
- Occupation: Actor
- Years active: 2009-present

Daniel Sträßer (born 18 July 1987) is a German actor and member of the ensemble of the Burgtheater in Vienna.

== Life ==
Sträßer already had the chance to be on stage as a student at a Waldorf school. From 2007 he studied acting at the Mozarteum University in Salzburg and graduated in the academic year 2011/2012. During his training he was engaged by Klang 21 for the Pocket Opera Festival Salzburg 2009 in a music theater production (Mahlzeit by Hans-Peter Jahn) directed by Thierry Bruehl. In a university production in 2011, he was discovered by the chief dramaturge of the Burgtheater at the Hamburg Young Talent Competition and made his successful debut there as Romeo.

As part of his studies, he worked in Müller's "Medeamaterial" (director: René Braun), in Trolle's "Hermes in der Stadt" (director: Simon Paul Schneider), in Hage's "De Niros Game" and in Crimp's "Attacks on Anne" (director: Katrin Plötner) and also in 2011 at the Salzburg Festival in A Midsummer Night's Dream. Sträßer, who names his university mentors Uwe Berend, the former head of drama, and the then guest lecturer (now professor there) Kai Ohrem, has worked on roles from Goethe to Martin Krimp.

In the 2013–14 season he worked in the contemporary witness production The Last Witnesses by Doron Rabinovici and Matthias Hartmann at the Burgtheater in Vienna; the production referred to the Kristallnacht of 1938, was highly appreciated by audiences and the press and was invited to the Berlin Theatertreffen 2014.

In March 2019 it was announced that Sträßer, together with Vladimir Burlakov, would embody the new chief inspectors Adam Schürk and Leo Bäumer in the crime serie Tatort set in Saarland for Saarländischer Rundfunk.

== Theater (selection) ==
=== Burgtheater Vienna (partly over several seasons) ===
- 2011/2012: Romeo and Juliet by William Shakespeare (Romeo) – Director: David Bösch
- 2011/2012: Wastwater by Simon Stephens (Harry) – directed by Stephan Kimmig
- 2011/2012: Die Froschfotzenlederfabrik by Oliver Kluck (colleague, activist, cousin, Gzemek) – director: Anna Bergmann
- 2011/2012: A Streetcar Named Desire by Tennessee Williams (A Young Cashier) – Director: Dieter Giesing
- 2012/2013: Some Messages to the Universe from Wolfram Lotz (Lum) – Director: Antú Romero Nunes
- 2012/2013: Liliom by Franz Molnár (Ficsur) – Director: Barbara Frey
- 2013/2014: Hamlet by William Shakespeare (Rosary Beads) – Directed by Andrea Breth
- 2013/2014: The Journey to Petushki by Venedikt Erofejew (Wenja) – Director: Felicitas Braun
- 2013/2014: A Sorrow Beyond Dreams by Peter Handke (The Son) – Director: Katie Mitchell
- 2013/2014: The Seagull by Anton Chekhov (Konstantin Gavrilovich Trepljov) – Director: Jan Bosse

== Filmography ==
- 2014: The Last Dance (Director: Houchang Allahyari)
- 2014: Schönefeld Boulevard
- 2015: Polizeiruf 110: Kreise
- 2015: Departure
- 2015: Alone in Berlin
- 2016: A Dangerous Fortune
- 2016: Lou Andreas-Salomé, The Audacity to be Free
- 2016: Egon Schiele: Death and the Maiden
- 2017: Charité
- 2020: Exile
- 2020: Tatort: Das fleißige Lieschen
- 2020: Hausen
- 2020: One step too far
- 2021: Tatort: Der Herr des Waldes
- 2021: A Pure Place
- 2022: Tatort: Das Herz der Schlange
- 2022: Funeral for a Dog
- 2022: Everything is fine
- 2023: Conti – Meine zwei Gesichter
- 2023: Tatort: Die Kälte der Erde
- 2024: Tatort: Der Fluch des Geldes
- 2024: Blindgänger
- 2025: Tatort: Das Ende der Nacht

== Awards ==
- 2012: Nestroy Theater Prize – Nominated for Best Young Actor as Romeo in Romeo and Juliet by William Shakespeare
- 2014: Nestroy Theater Prize – Nominated for Best Actor as Konstantin in The Seagull by Anton Chekhov
