= Mareike Wegener =

German filmmaker

- Born: Mareike Wegener; 1983 (age 42–43)
- Education: The New School; Academy of Media Arts Cologne
- Occupations: Film director; Screenwriter; Film producer
- Years active: 2005 - present
- Notable work: Mark Lombardi – Kunst und Konspiration; Echo; Oeconomia
- Awards: Förderpreis des Landes Nordrhein-Westfalen für junge Künstlerinnen und Künstler
- Website: www.petroliofilm.de

Mareike Wegener (born 1983) is a German film director, screenwriter and film producer based in Cologne, Germany.

== Biography ==
Wegener was born in 1983 in Borken, a town in the Münster region of Westphalia. She was raised close to the border of the Netherlands where her father, Eckhard Wegener, a musician, operated a jazz restaurant. Following her high school graduation, she began her professional journey as an assistant editor at a film and television studio in Hamburg. This experience paved the way for her academic pursuit in audiovisual media, which she began in 2003 at the Academy of Media Arts Cologne. It was during her time there that she directed her initial projects, among them the short film Haarteile in 2005. Wegener later studied documentary film and media studies at The New School in New York before completing her studies in Germany with a diploma. She also pursued her studies in Media and Communication at the European Graduate School in Switzerland. Her thesis, the documentary Al Hansen. The Matchstick Traveller (2008), premiered at the Anthology Film Archives in January 2009.

In 2009, Wegener received the Gerd-Ruge-Grant for her documentary film project Mark Lombardi – Kunst und Konspiration, which was shot in New York the following year. The film was about the life of artist Mark Lombardi, whose diagram like drawings intricately interwove verifiable links between politics, the financial economy and organized crime. The film premiered at the Filmfestival Max Ophüls Preis in 2012 and was subsequently shown at the Sheffield Doc/Fest, Brooklyn Film Festival and Zurich Film Festival among others. In the US, the film was shown at the Museum of Modern Art in New York City.

In 2012, Wegener co-founded a production company, Petrolio, with Hannes Lang and Carmen Losmann. In 2014, she collaborated with Lang and produced a feature documentary I Want To See The Manager. The film was nominated for the CPH:DOX Award at the Copenhagen International Documentary Film Festival in 2014. It also received the nomination for the Golden Firebird Award at the Hong Kong International Film Festival in 2015. Also in 2014, the film received the Gli Imperdibili Preis at the Festival dei popoli.

In 2019, Wegener produced a short documentary film Riafn which was directed by Hannes Lang and premiered at Visions du Réel. The film received awards across multiple categories at various film festivals including the Trento Film Festival, Innsbruck Nature Film Festival and the International Short Film Festival Oberhausen. In 2020, Wegener produced Oeconomia, a feature-length documentary directed by Carmen Losmann. The film premiered at the Forum section of the 70th Berlin International Film Festival. Wegener's short film X, an ancestral ritual in honor of the spirits of the Ruhr area, premiered in May 2021 at the International Short Film Festival Oberhausen and received a nomination for the German Short Film Award. Her first full-length feature film Echo was invited to the 72nd Berlin International Film Festival in 2022.

In 2022, she began teaching as a visiting professor in the field of documentary film at the LUCA School of Arts in Brussels.

== Filmography ==
=== Director/Writer ===
Year	Title	Notes
2005	Haarteile	Documentary short film
2006	Ecke-Erdtrabant	Documentary short film
2009	Al Hansen. The Matchstick Traveller	Documentary film
2010	Gartenträume	Documentary series for Arte
2012	Mark Lombardi – Kunst und Konspiration	Documentary film
2021	X	Short film
2022	Echo	Feature film

=== Co-writer ===
Year	Title	Notes
2008	Leavenworth, WA	Documentary short film
2011	Peak – Über allen Gipfeln	Documentary film
2014	I Want To See The Manager	Documentary film
2019	Riafn	Documentary short film
2025	The Cloud Factory	Documentary short film

=== Producer ===
Year	Title	Notes
2014	I Want To See The Manager	Documentary film
2019	Riafn	Documentary short film
2020	Oeconomia	Documentary film
2021	X	Short film
2022	Echo	Feature film
2025	The Cloud Factory	Documentary short film

Reference:- Mareike Wegener at filmportal.de

== Recognitions ==
- 2009: Gerd-Ruge-Grant for Mark Lombardi – Kunst und Konspiration.
- 2013:Förderpreis des Landes Nordrhein-Westfalen für junge Künstlerinnen und Künstler (Award of the State of North Rhine-Westphalia for young artists).
- 2021: Deutscher Kurzfilmpreis (German Short Film Award) nomination for X.
- 2022: Nomination for the GWFF Award at the 72nd Berlin International Film Festival for Echo.
- 2023: Kompagnon Fellowship, awarded by Perspektive Deutsches Kino and Berlinale Talents.
