= List of German films of the 1950s =

List of German film lists from the 1950s. From 1949 Germany was divided into East and West Germany. Both had separate film industries.
