= Mario Sixtus =

German journalist, filmmaker, screenwriter

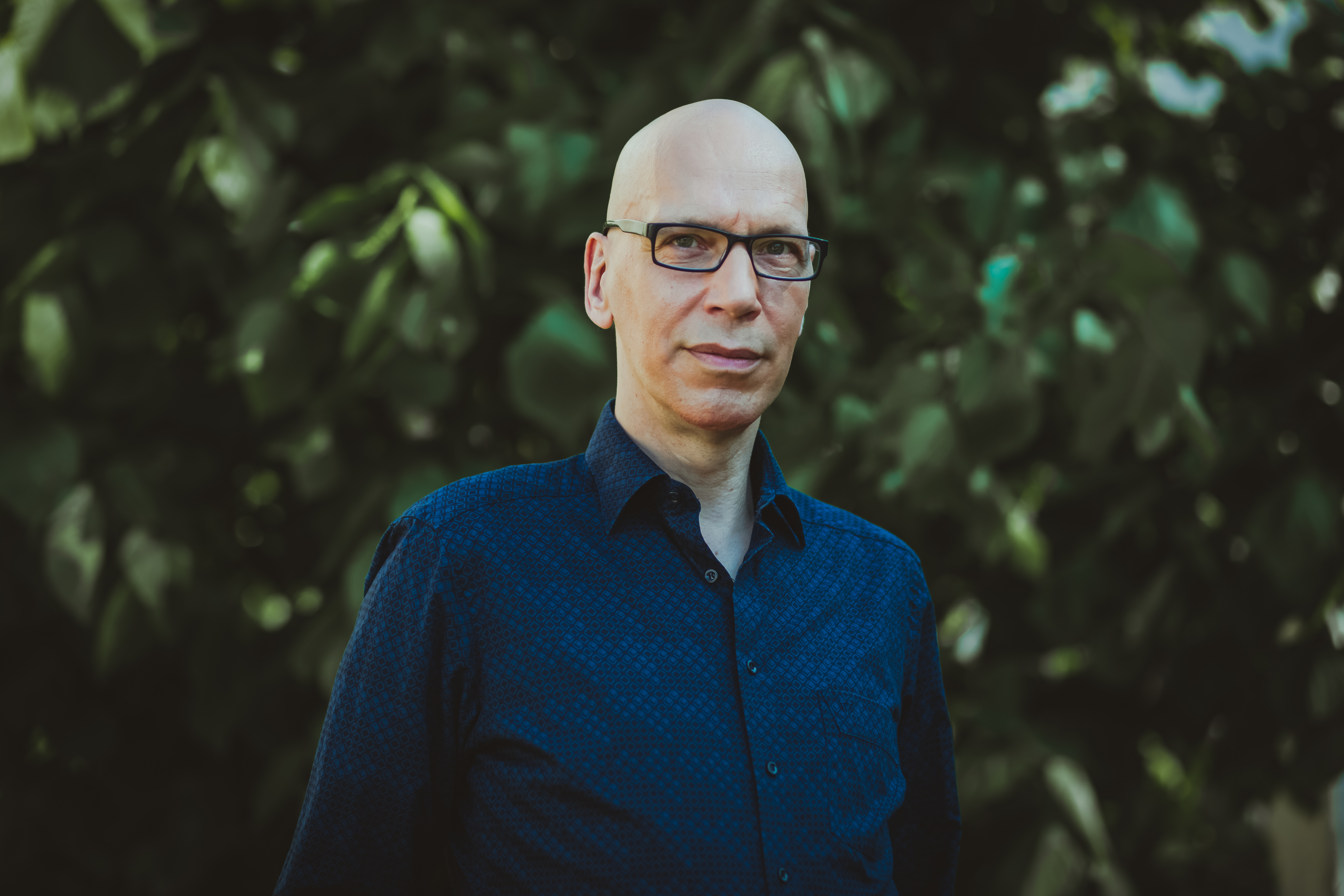
Sixtus in 2018

Mario Sixtus is a German journalist, filmmaker and screenwriter. His work focuses on current developments of the internet, internet culture and politics. Sixtus writes for nationwide newspapers that include Die Zeit, Focus, Frankfurter Allgemeine Sonntagszeitung, and Handelsblatt.

== Work ==
His film work spans from documentary features to fiction screenwriting and directing.

Sixtus hosted 155 episodes of the show Electric Reporter on the channel ZDFinfo between 2008–2016, focussing on topics related to the digital transformation of society. In 2007, for the series, Sixtus received the Grimme Online Award and the LeadAward.

Sixtus' feature film Hyperland was nominated for the Grimme Award and the German Television Prize in 2022. In 2024, he directed the full length documentary on China's influence on American feature film production, Hollywood under Chinese Influence, for arte tv.

== Bibliography ==
- Sixtus, Mario (2019). Warum an die Zukunft denken? (1. Auflage ed.). Berlin: Dudenverlag. ISBN 978-3-411-75634-6.
- Sixtus, Mario (2025). Picknick auf der Autobahn – Wie wir in Zukunft unterwegs sein werden (1. Auflage ed.). Frankfurt: S.Fischer. ISBN 978-3-10-397670-0.

== Literature ==
- Weichert, Stephan; Zabel, Christian, eds. (2009). Die Alpha-Journalisten 2.0: Deutschlands neue Wortführer im Porträt. Köln: von Halem. pp. 232–241. ISBN 978-3-938258-92-7.
