= Silke Bodenbender =

German actress

Silke Bodenbender (born 31 January 1974 in Bonn) is a German actress.

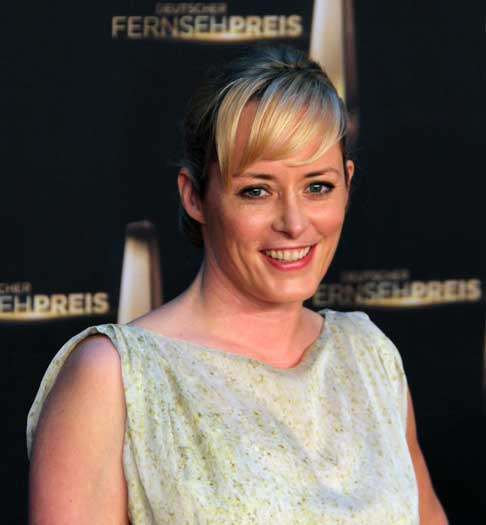
Silke Bodenbender (2012)

== Selected filmography ==
TV
Year	Title	Role	Notes
2007	Raging Inferno	Katja Strasser	TV film
2008	Ten: Umbra Mortis	Monica Faber	TV film
2009	Operation Guardian Angel	Nadja Mohn	TV film
2009	Über den Tod hinaus	Elke Wagner	TV film
2010	Until Nothing Remains	Gine Reiners	TV film
2014	The Lies You Sleep With	Charly	TV film
2014	Burning Souls	Johanna	TV film
2022	De Stamhouder	Erica Münninghoff	TV serial

Film
Year	Title	Role	Notes
2023	Someday We'll Tell Each Other Everything	Marianne	
