= Marc Hosemann =

German actor

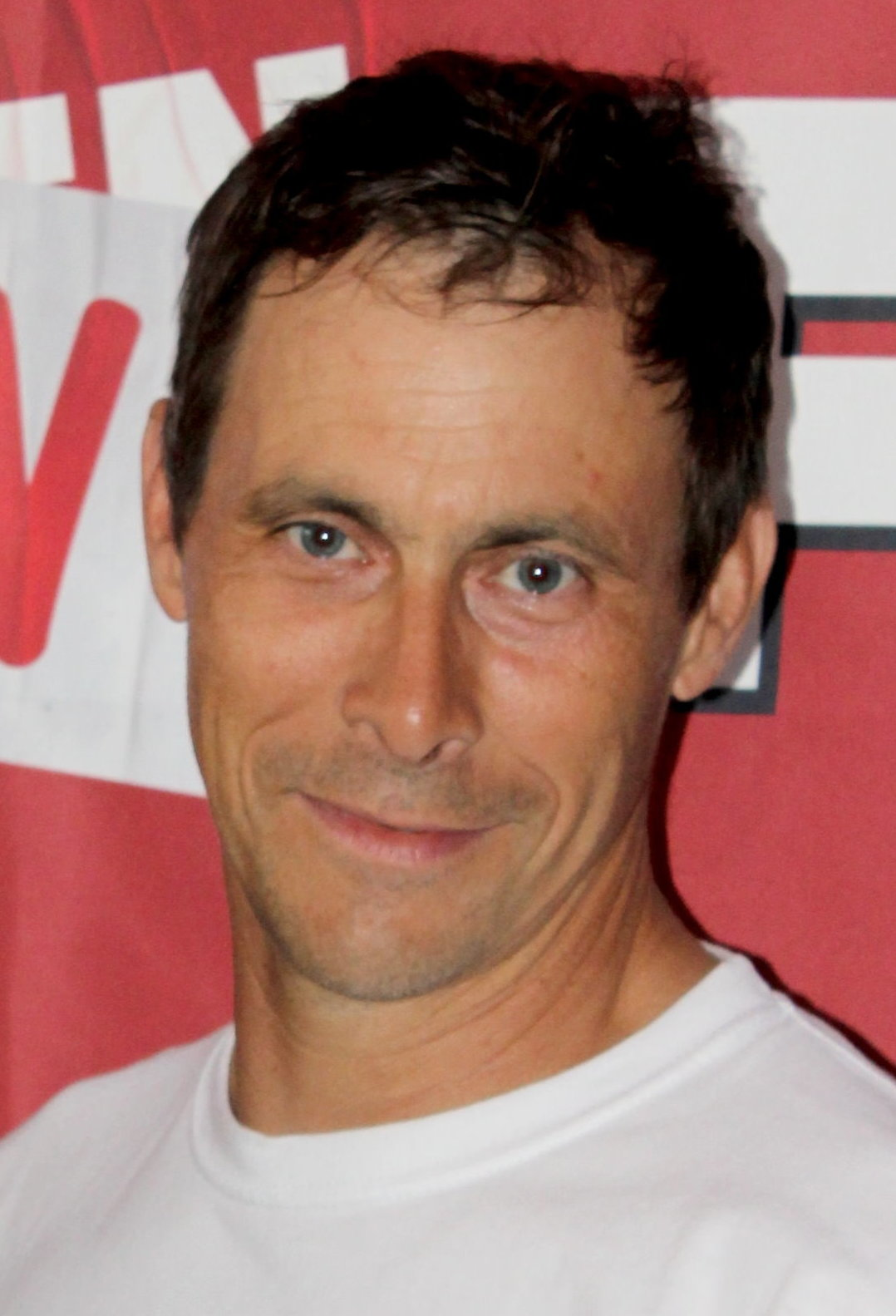
- Hosemann in 2018
- Born: 20 August 1970 (age 55); Hamburg, West Germany

Marc Hosemann (born 20 August 1970 in Hamburg) is a German actor.

== Filmography (selection) ==
- Alles außer Mord (1996, TV)
- Short Sharp Shock (1998)
- Long Hello and Short Goodbye (1999)
- Investigating Sex (2001)
- Jargo (2004)
- A Mere Formality (2006)
- Black Sheep (2006)
- The Best Is Yet to Come (2008)
- Soul Kitchen (2009)
- Die Gänsemagd (2009, TV)
- Zweiohrküken (2009)
- A Coffee in Berlin (2012)
- Sechzehneichen (2012)
- Alarm für Cobra 11 - Die Autobahnpolizei (2014, 2018)
- Tatort: Frühstück für immer (2014)
- Family Party (2015)
- Goodbye Berlin (2016)
- Magical Mystery or: The Return of Karl Schmidt (2017)
- Parfum (2018)
- The Golden Glove (2019)
- Ein Fest fürs Leben (2023)
