= Florian Stetter =

German actor (born 1977)

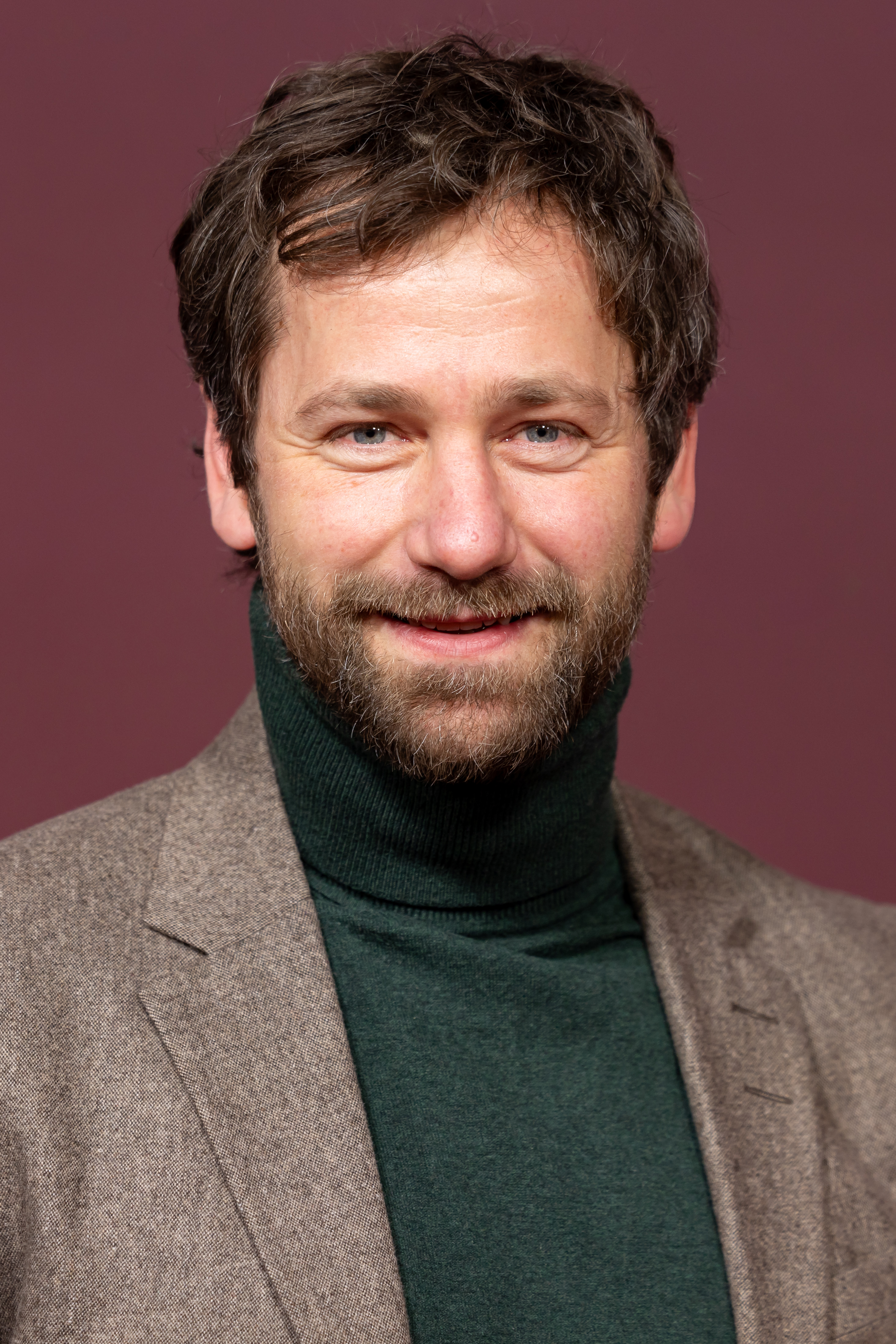
- Stetter in 2025
- Born: 2 August 1977; Munich, West Germany
- Occupation: Actor
- Years active: 2000 – present

Florian Stetter (born August 2, 1977) is a German actor.

== Awards ==
| Year | Awards | Category | Nominated | Result |
|---|---|---|---|---|
| 2015 | 37th Jupiter Award | Best German Actor | Beloved Sisters | Nominated |
| 2016 | 44th International Emmy Awards | Best Performance by an Actor | Naked Among Wolves | Nominated |
| 2016 | Monte-Carlo Television Festival | Best Actor - Long Fiction Program | Naked Among Wolves | Nominated |
| 2016 | Deutscher Fernsehpreis | Best Actor | Naked Among Wolves | Nominated |
