= Exile (2020 film) =

2020 film

- Film poster
- Directed by: Visar Morina
- Written by: Visar Morina; Ulrich Köhler
- Produced by: Maren Ade; Jonas Dornbach; Janine Jackowski
- Starring: Mišel Matičević; Sandra Hüller
- Cinematography: Matteo Cocco
- Edited by: Laura Lauzemis; Visar Morina; Hansjörg Weißbrich
- Release date: 27 January 2020 (Sundance)
- Running time: 121 minutes
- Countries: Germany; Kosovo; Belgium
- Languages: German; Albanian

Exile (German: Exil) is a 2020 Kosovan-German-Belgian thriller drama film directed by Visar Morina. It was selected as the Kosovan entry for the Best International Feature Film at the 93rd Academy Awards, but it was not nominated.

== Synopsis ==
A Kosovan immigrant living in Germany believes he's a victim of xenophobia, but it may be his own paranoia spiraling out of control.

== Cast ==
- Mišel Matičević as Xhafer
- Sandra Hüller as Nora
- Rainer Bock as Urs
- Thomas Mraz as Manfred
- Flonja Kodheli as Hatixhe
- Stephan Grossmann as Mr. Winkler
- Victoria Trauttmansdorff as Urs' Wife
- Daniel Sträßer as Georg

== See also ==
- List of submissions to the 93rd Academy Awards for Best International Feature Film
- List of Kosovan submissions for the Academy Award for Best International Feature Film
