= Peter Schneider (actor) =

German actor (born 1975)

- Born: 1975 (age 50–51); Leipzig, East Germany
- Occupations: Actor; musician
- Years active: 2000–present
- Website: peter-schneider.tv

Peter Schneider (born 1975) is a German actor and musician.

== Biography ==
Schneider was born in 1975 in Leipzig, in what was then East Germany. From 1985 until the late 1990s, he studied at a music school in Halle. After graduating from high school in 1994 and completing his military service, he studied music at the Leipzig University of Music and Theater from 1995 until 1998. He specialized in the clarinet and saxophone, while at the same time taking German studies and pedagogy at Leipzig University. In 1998, he switched to studying drama at the Leipzig University of Music and Theater, from which he graduated in 2002. From 2000 to 2002, Schneider was an acting student at Theater Chemnitz.

Apart from his acting work, Schneider also works as theater musical director, musician, and composer. He is a member of the Deutsche Filmakademie and the European Film Academy.

Since 2017, Schneider has portrayed middle-aged Helge Doppler in the Netflix series Dark.

== Selected filmography ==
=== Film ===
List of film appearances, with year, title, and role shown
Year	Title	Role	Notes
2004	My Brother Is a Dog	driver	
2005	Speer und Er	Albert Speer	Documentary
2008	Berlin Calling	Crystal Pete	
2008	The Baader Meinhof Complex	Gerhard Müller	
2011	Hut in the Woods	Martin	
2014	Beloved Sisters	Christian Gottfried Körner	
2015	As We Were Dreaming	drinker Thilo	
2015	Naked Among Wolves	André Höfel	
2015	A Heavy Heart	job agent	
2023	Someday We'll Tell Each Other Everything	Volker	

=== Television ===
List of television appearances, with year, title, and role shown
Year	Title	Role	Notes
2004	In aller Freundschaft		
2009	Tatort	Ulf Meinert	1 episode
2012	Tatort	Joseph Vegener/Robert Vegener	1 episode
2013	Kommissarin Lucas	Robert Kienle	1 episode
2013	Tatort	Ulrich Kastner	1 episode
2015	Tannbach	Adolph Herrmann	
2015	Schuld nach Ferdinand von Schirach	Prosecutor	1 episode
2015	Polizeiruf 110	Moritz Richter	1 episode
2015	Tatort	Urs Hahn	1 episode
2017	Tatort	Harald Böhlert	1 episode
2017–2020	Dark	Helge Doppler	
2020	Tatort	Rainer Hildebrandt	1 episode

== Awards ==
- Nominated for the Deutscher Filmpreis (German Film Award) in the category Best Acting Performance - Male Leading Role, for Hut in the Woods (2012)
- Nominated for the Preis der deutschen Filmkritik (German Film Critics Award) in the category Best Actor for his performance in Hut in the Woods (2013)
