= Lisa Maria Potthoff =

German actress (born 1978)

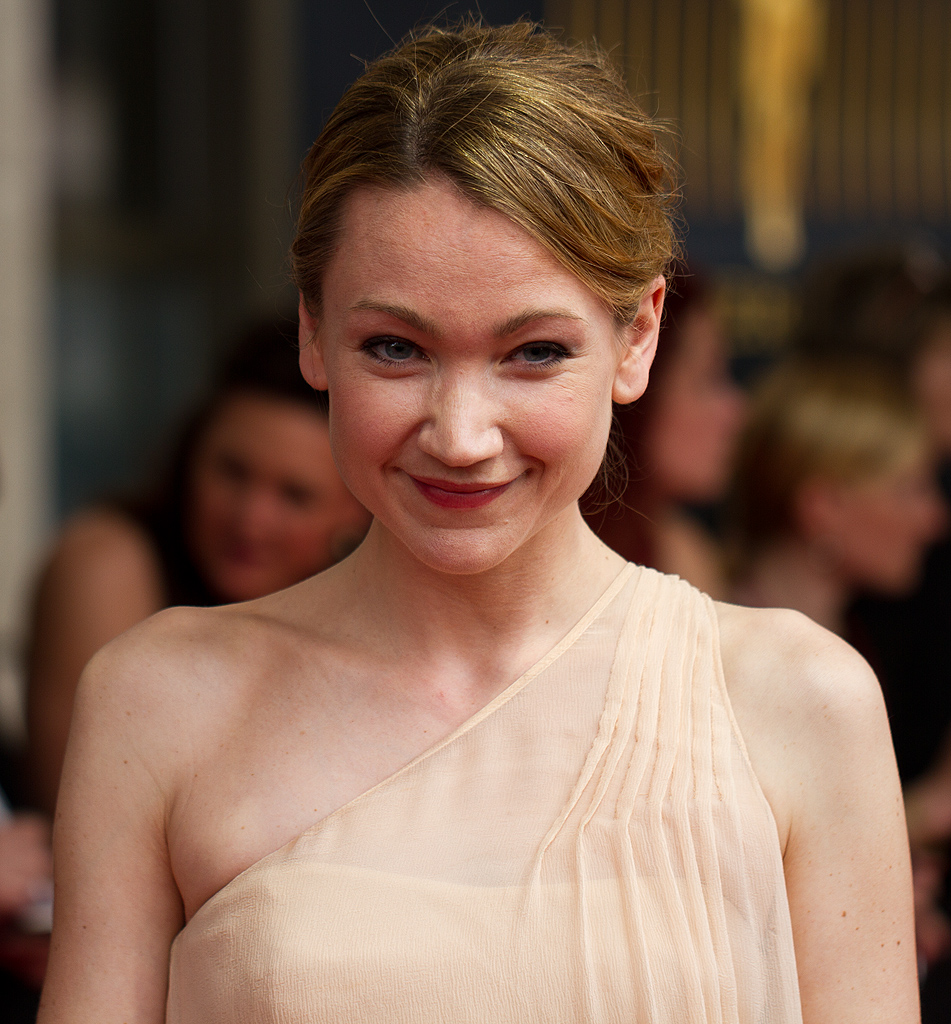
- Potthoff in 2012
- Born: 25 July 1978 (age 46); West Berlin, West Germany
- Occupation: Actress
- Children: 2

Lisa Maria Potthoff (born West Berlin, 25 July 1978) is a German actress.

== Career ==
Potthoff grew up in Munich, where she also completed her acting training at Schauspiel München. Even before and during her apprenticeship, she had her first roles in various television series from 1995, such as Polizeiruf 110 and SOKO 5113. On television, she had leading roles in Bitter Innocence, Holstein Lovers, A Christmas Tale, Summer Wind, Blond: Eva Blond!, Death Is No Proof and alongside Herbert Knaup in The Inspector's Daughter. In recent years, Potthoff has also played leading roles in films, including as "Braut Sophie" in the black comedy The Wedding Party, as "Nadja" in Soloalbum, as "Susanne", manager of a gay soccer team, in Guys and Balls and as Eleonore Schikaneder in Marcus H. Rosenmüller's Sommer der Gaukler. Since 2013 she has played the role of Susi in the homeland crime film series about the police officer Franz Eberhofer, based on the book series by Rita Falk. In 2014, ZDF released the Sarah Kohr series, with Potthoff in the leading role as police inspector.

== Personal life ==
Potthoff lives in Munich, Married with Thorsten Berg and has two children.
