= Lars Becker =

German film director and screenwriter (born 1954)

Lars Becker (born 12 January 1954, Hanover) is a German film director, screenwriter, and crime writer.

== Selected filmography ==
- Shadow Boxer (1992)
- Bunte Hunde (1995)
- Das Gelbe vom Ei (1999, TV film)
- Kanak Attack (2000)
- Run While You Can (2001, TV film)
- Nachtschicht (since 2003, TV series, 16 episodes)
- Schade um das schöne Geld (2008, TV film)
- Amigo (2010, TV film)
- Schief gewickelt (2011, TV film)
- Never Trust Your Wife (2012, TV film)
- Unter Feinden (2013–2021, TV series, 4 episodes)
- Der gute Bulle (since 2017, TV series, 4 episodes)
