= Rainer Bock =

German actor and voice actor (born 1954)

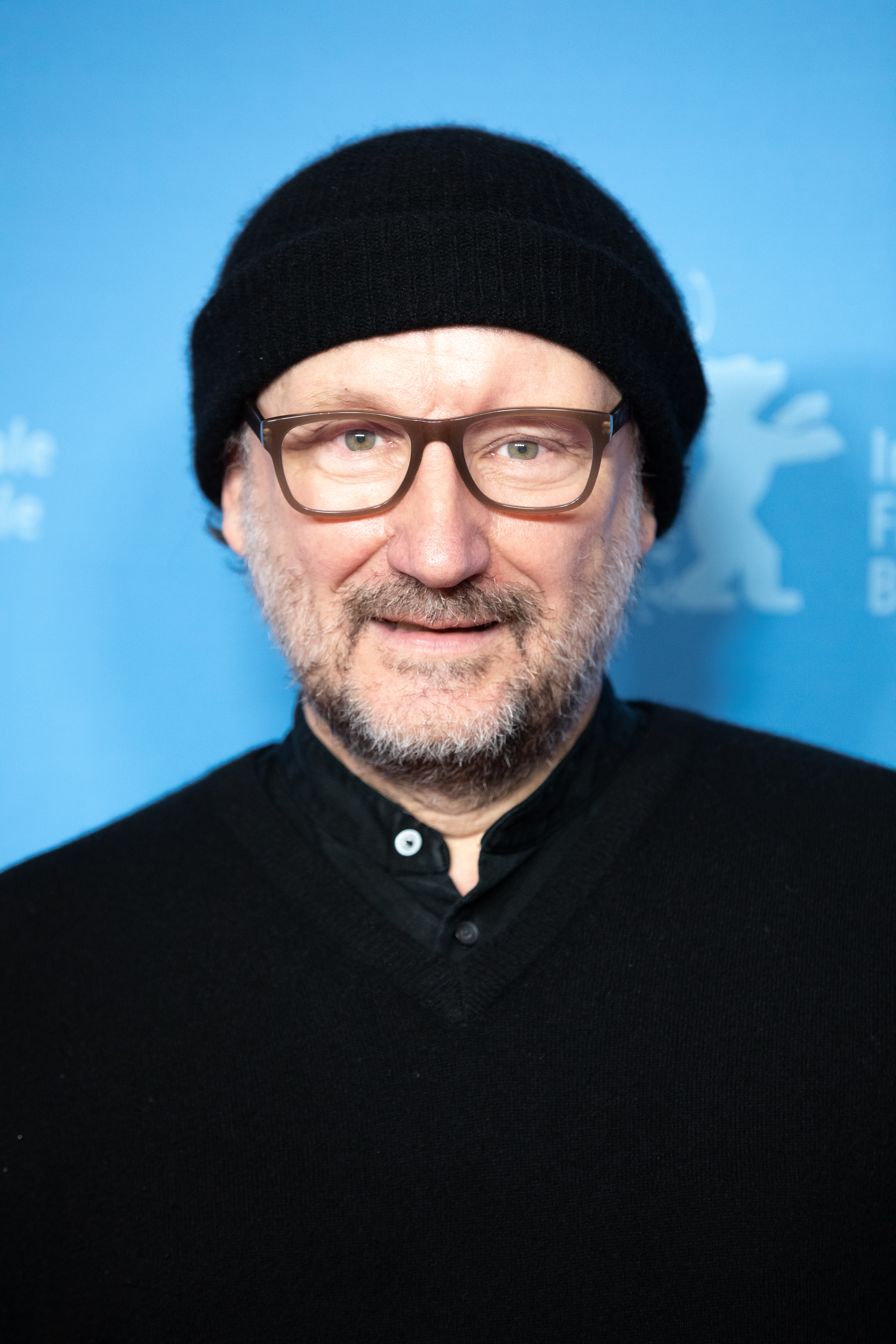
- Bock in 2020
- Born: 31 July 1954 (age 72); Kiel, West Germany
- Occupation: Actor
- Years active: 1982–present

Rainer Bock (German pronunciation: [ˈʁaɪnɐ ˈbɔk]; born 31 July 1954) is a German actor and voice actor. To English-speaking audiences, he is best known for portraying Werner Ziegler in the fourth season of the AMC television series Better Call Saul.

== Early life and education ==
Bock was born in Kiel, Germany. After graduating from school, he ran a café in his hometown, where there was also a cabaret programme. After studying acting at a private drama school in Kiel, Bock made his debut in 1982 as a theatre actor on the stages of Kiel.

== Career ==
He had already worked as a stage actor for about 25 years, beginning in 1982, in Kiel, at the National Theatre Mannheim, the Staatstheater Stuttgart, and at the Bavarian State Theatre in Munich, before his film work increased by the end of the 2000s. In 2011, four films in which he acted were presented at the 61st Berlin International Film Festival.

Bock appeared in internationally known films directed by Steven Spielberg, Quentin Tarantino and Michael Haneke, and played minor roles in the TV shows Homeland, Better Call Saul, and SS-GB.

== Filmography ==
=== Film ===
Year	Title	Role	Notes
1998	Die Healthy	Christoph Wimmer	
2000	Now or Never	Makowski	
2003	Getting a Life		
2008	A Year Ago in Winter	Richard 'Ritschy' Peters	
2009	Inglourious Basterds	General Schonherr	
2009	The White Ribbon	The Doctor	
2010	Picco	Herr Reinhard	
2010	In the Shadows	Nico	
2011	My Best Enemy	SS-Hauptsturmführer Rauter	
2011	Unknown	Herr Strauss	
2011	If Not Us, Who?	Defense lawyer	
2011	Tabu: The Soul Is a Stranger on Earth	Prof. Albert Brückner	
2011	War Horse	Brandt	
2012	Barbara	Klaus Schütz	
2012	Russian Disco	Herr Kaminer	
2012	Guardians	Karl Falkner	
2012	Passion	Inspector Bach	
2012	Two Lives	Hugo	
2013	Hansel and Gretel: Witch Hunters	Mayor Engleman	
2013	Tracks	Kurt	
2013	The Book Thief	Bürgermeister Hermann	
2013	Run Boy Run	SS-Officer	
2014	A Most Wanted Man	Dieter Mohr	
2014	Stereo	Wolfgang	
2014	Dessau Dancers	Hartmann Dietz	
2016	Scrappin'	Herr Seifert	
2016	The Most Beautiful Day	Dr. Wüst	
2017	Einsamkeit und Sex und Mitleid	Robert / Father	
2017	Wonder Woman	Paul von Hindenburg	
2017	Luna	Behringer	
2017	Die Anfängerin	Rolf Buschhaus	
2017	Godless Youth	Trainer	
2017	Arthur & Claire	Dr. Sebastian Hofer	
2018	Never Look Away	Dr. Burghart Kroll	
2018	Atlas	Walter Scholl	
2019	Rate Your Date	Bruno	
2019	The Collini Case	Dr. Reimers	
2020	Exile	Urs	
2026	The Idiot(s)		

=== Television ===
Year	Title	Role	Notes
2014	1864	Otto von Bismarck	6 episodes
2014	The Chosen Ones	Helmut Hoffmann	TV film
2015	Naked Among Wolves	Alois Schwahl	TV film
2015	Homeland	BND Officer Keller	Episode: "Better Call Saul"
2016	Winnetou	James Bancroft	2 episodes
2016	The Verdict	Oberstleutnant Lauterbach	TV film
2017	SS-GB	Fritz Kellermann	5 episodes
2018	Better Call Saul	Werner Ziegler	6 episodes Nominated – Saturn Award for Best Guest Starring Role on Television; Nominated – Screen Actors Guild Award for Outstanding Performance by an Ensemble in a Drama Series
2018–23	Das Boot	Gluck	20 episodes

== Audiobooks ==
- 2006: Agatha Christie: Die Morde des Herrn ABC (Hercule Poirot), publisher: Der Hörverlag, ISBN 978-3-89940-789-1
