= When Will It Be Again Like It Never Was Before =

2023 German-language comedy drama film

- Theatrical release poster
- Directed by: Sonja Heiss
- Written by: Sonja Heiss; Lars Hubrich
- Based on: Wann wird es endlich wieder so, wie es nie war by Joachim Meyerhoff
- Produced by: Janine Jackowski; Jonas Dornbach; Maren Ade
- Starring: Devid Striesow; Laura Tonke; Arsseni Bultmann; Axel Milberg
- Cinematography: Manuel Dacosse
- Edited by: Julia Karg
- Music by: Dickon Hinchliffe
- Production companies: Komplizen Film; Warner Bros. Film Productions Germany; Frakas Productions
- Distributed by: Warner Bros. Pictures (Germany); Belga Films (Belgium)
- Release date: 23 February 2023 (Germany)
- Running time: 116 minutes
- Countries: Germany; Belgium
- Language: German
- Box office: $4.3 million

When Will It Be Again Like It Never Was Before (German: Wann wird es endlich wieder so, wie es nie war) is a 2023 German-language comedy drama film directed by Sonja Heiss, based on the autobiography Wann wird es endlich wieder so, wie es nie war by Joachim Meyerhoff.

The film was released in Germany on 23 February 2023 by Warner Bros. Pictures.

== Cast ==
- Arsseni Bultmann as Joachim Meyerhoff (14 years old)
  - Merlin Rose as Joachim Meyerhoff (25 years old)
    - Camille Moltzen as Joachim Meyerhoff (7 years old)
- Laura Tonke as Iris Meyerhoff
- Devid Striesow as Richard Meyerhoff
- Pola Geiger as Marlene
- Casper von Bülow as Philipp Meyerhoff
- Axel Milberg as Ministerpräsident
