= Laura Tonke =

German actress (born 1974)

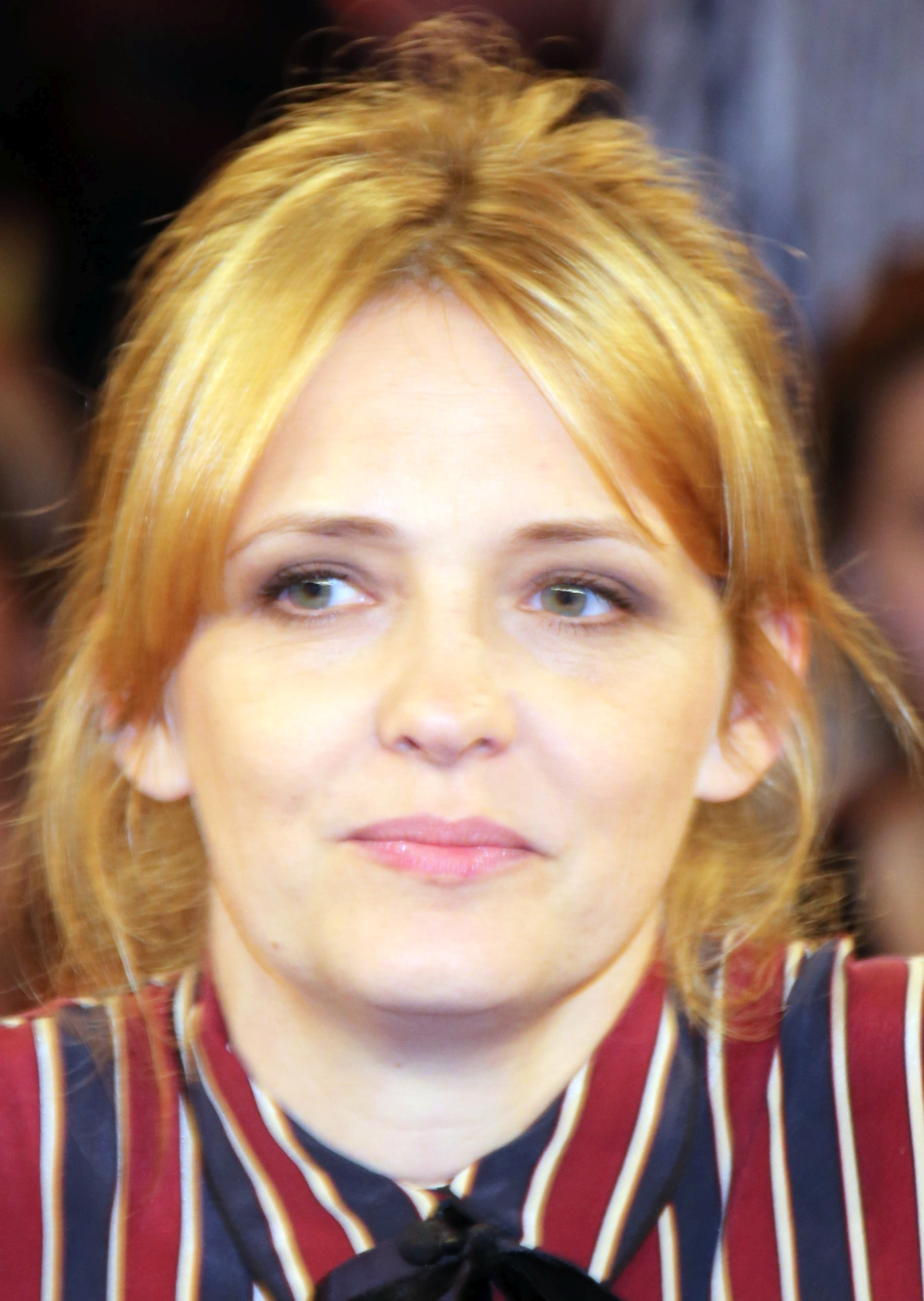
Laura Tonke

Laura Tonke (born 14 April 1974 in West Berlin) is a German actress.

== Selected filmography ==
Year	Title	Role	Notes
1991	Ostkreuz		
1994	Turn Down the Music	Anne	TV film
1997	Winter Sleepers	Jill	
1998	Just Married	Frangipani	
1999	Angel Express		
2001	Heart	Gisela Kenter	
2002	Baader		
2004	Farland	Karla	
2005	I Am Guilty	Christiane Steeb	
2007	Day of Disaster	Katharina Wolters	TV film
2010	Eine flexible Frau	Ann	
2014	Worst Case Scenario	Meike	
2015	Hedi Schneider Is Stuck		
2015	The People vs. Fritz Bauer		
2016	Too Hard to Handle		
2017	Axolotl Overkill		
2023	When Will It Be Again Like It Never Was Before	Iris Meyerhoff	
2025	Amrum	Hille Hagener	
2026	Ach, diese Lücke, diese entsetzliche Lücke	Iris Meyerhoff	
