= Someday We'll Tell Each Other Everything =

2023 German drama film

Someday We’ll Tell Each Other Everything
- Promotional poster
- German: Irgendwann werden wir uns alles erzählen
- Directed by: Emily Atef
- Written by: Emily Atef; Daniela Krien
- Based on: Irgendwann werden wir uns alles erzählen by Daniela Krien
- Produced by: Karsten Stoeter
- Starring: Marlene Burow; Felix Kramer
- Cinematography: Armin Dierolf
- Edited by: Anne Fabini
- Music by: Christoph M. Kaiser; Julian Maas
- Production companies: Rohfilm Factory GmbH; Mitteldeutscher Rundfunk; Arte; Südwestrundfunk; Rundfunk Berlin-Brandenburg
- Distributed by: Pandora Film Medien GmbH; The Match Factory GmbH
- Release dates: 17 February 2023 (Berlinale); 14 April 2023 (Germany)
- Running time: 129 minutes
- Country: Germany
- Language: German

Someday We’ll Tell Each Other Everything (German: Irgendwann werden wir uns alles erzählen) is a 2023 German drama film directed by Emily Atef, and starring Marlene Burow and Felix Kramer. The film is based on the 2011 novel of the same name by Daniela Krien, and its screenplay was written by Krien and Atef. Set in 1990 in the former East Germany, the storyline follows a young woman who begins a relationship with a farmer twice her age.

Someday We’ll Tell Each Other Everything was selected to compete for the Golden Bear at the 73rd Berlin International Film Festival, where it had its world premiere on 17 February 2023. The film's script was nominated for the 2022 German Screenplay Award. It was released in cinemas on 14 April 2023. The film received mixed reviews from critics.

== Synopsis ==
It is the summer of 1990, the Berlin Wall has fallen and it is the last summer in the GDR before reunification. Maria, a delicate 19-year-old girl, lives with her boyfriend Johannes on his parents' Dreiseithof farm, the Brendel Hof. Right next to it is the Henner Hof, the largest farm in the area, where Henner, a 40-year-old morose and taciturn man, lives alone. His idiosyncratic demeanour and his reputation as a heartthrob amongst local women make socialisation between them difficult. Maria meets him by chance, and a single touch is enough to start a tragic love in a changing country.

The film's title refers to the phrase from The Brothers Karamazov by Dostoevsky—translated from original Russian into German (spoken by Alexei Karamazov on the last page almost at the very end of the novel); the book is read by Maria throughout the film and the final scene ends with that quotation being read aloud just before the closing credits:

- — Непременно восстанем, непременно увидим и весело, радостно расскажем друг другу всё, что было, — полусмеясь, полу в восторге ответил Алеша.
- »Sicherlich werden wir auferstehen, sicherlich werden wir uns wiedersehen und uns froh und heiter alles erzählen, was uns im Leben begegnet ist«, antwortete Aljoscha, halb lachend, halb begeistert.
- “Certainly we shall all rise again, certainly we shall see each other and shall tell each other with joy and gladness all that has happened!” Alyosha answered, half laughing, half enthusiastic.

— Fyodor Dostoevsky, The Brothers Karamazov, Epilogue, Chapter III "Ilusha’s Funeral. The Speech At The Stone"

== Cast ==
- Marlene Burow as Maria
- Felix Kramer as Henner
- Cedric Eich as Johannes Brendel
- Silke Bodenbender as Marianne
- Christine Schorn as Frieda Brendel
- Peter Schneider as Volker
- Victoria Mayer as Gisela
- Jördis Triebel as Hannah
- Tom Quaas as Lindenwirth
- German von Beug as Lukas Brendel
- Petra Kalkutschke as Oma Traudel
- Stephanie Petrowitz as Sabine
- Christian Erdmann as Hartmut
- Peter Rauch as Egon
- Anni Kaltwasser as Paula
- Philippine Pachl as Franzi (waitress in Munich)

== Production ==
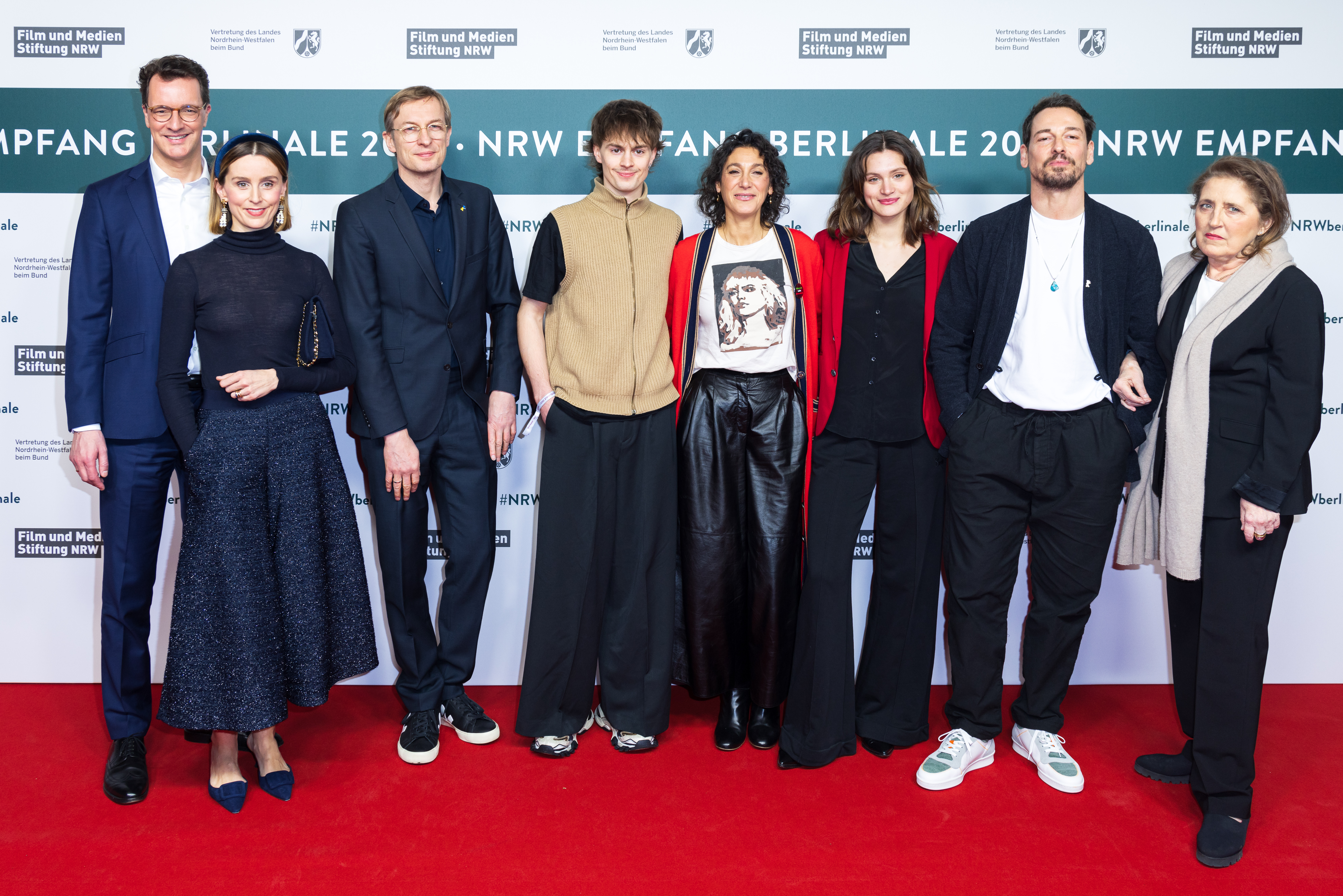
Hendrik Wüst, Katharina Wüst, Karsten Stöter, Cedric Eich, Emily Atef, Marlene Burow, Felix Kramer and Petra Müller, the film team of Someday We'll Tell Each Other Everything at the 20th Berlinale reception in the North Rhine-Westphalian state representation, Berlinale 2023

Based on Daniela Krien’s novel of the same name, the film is set in the summer of 1990 in the countryside of Thuringia, in the former East Germany. It was produced by Karsten Stöter for Row Pictures, with the cast featuring Marlene Burow and Felix Kramer.

Principal photography took place from 15 June to 27 July 2022 in the federal state of Thuringia, Germany.

== Release ==
The film had its premiere on 17 February 2023 in the Main Competition part of the 73rd Berlin Film Festival.

On 20 March 2023, it was reported that Strand Releasing acquired all North American rights to the film.

Someday We'll Tell Each Other Everything was released in German cinemas on 13 April 2023.

== Reception ==
On the review aggregator Rotten Tomatoes website, the film has an approval rating of 38% based on 8 reviews, with an average rating of 6/10. On Metacritic, it has a weighted average score of 67 out of 100 based on 5 reviews, indicating "generally favorable reviews".

Peter Bradshaw of The Guardian rated the film with 4 stars out of 5 and wrote, "It’s a vehement movie, with a driving narrative force and a robust sense of time and place."

Guy Lodge, reviewing at Berlin Film Festival for Variety wrote, "Beyond the festival circuit, this pretty but somewhat dreary mood piece is unlikely to end up on many people’s radars at all." Concluding, Lodge quotes dialogue of the protagonist Maria's mother, “Life can be very painful, but it will pass,” and Lodge then writes, "The film waits it out." Jordan Mintzer for The Hollywood Reporter stated that the film is "fraught with passion and platitudes", and opined that it "veers toward caricature midway through, never to find its way again". He concluded, "A movie that starts off as an intriguing and well-observed coming-of-age drama, until it opts for the bedroom over the bigger picture."

Writing for Cineuropa, Davide Abbatescianni billed it as "a sappy coming-of-age melodrama" which sports "cheesy dialogues, slow pacing, a rather over-explanatory approach when dealing with the period it covers, many relatives whose presence does not add anything to the development of the plot - such as the lost son who fled to the West, and returns home with his wife and kids - and a communist Pioneers childhood song performed by Maria out of the blue, among other things."

Jonathan Romney for ScreenDaily wrote in review that the film is "Atef’s new film, a small-scale drama nevertheless attaining novelistic richness, stands to be her most successful yet, especially given contemporary demand for intelligent stories told from a perspective of female desire."

Steph Green writing for British Film Institute graded the film 3/5 and wrote, "But for all its beauty and sexual slipperiness, the film trips itself up with juvenile plot developments ripped from a romance paperback."

== Accolades ==
| Award | Date | Category | Recipient | Result | Ref. |
|---|---|---|---|---|---|
| Berlin International Film Festival | 16–26 February 2023 | Golden Bear | Someday We’ll Tell Each Other Everything | Nominated | |
| German Film Award | 12 May 2023 | 73rd German Film Awards Pre-selection | Someday We’ll Tell Each Other Everything | Nominated | |
