= Ruby O. Fee =

German actress

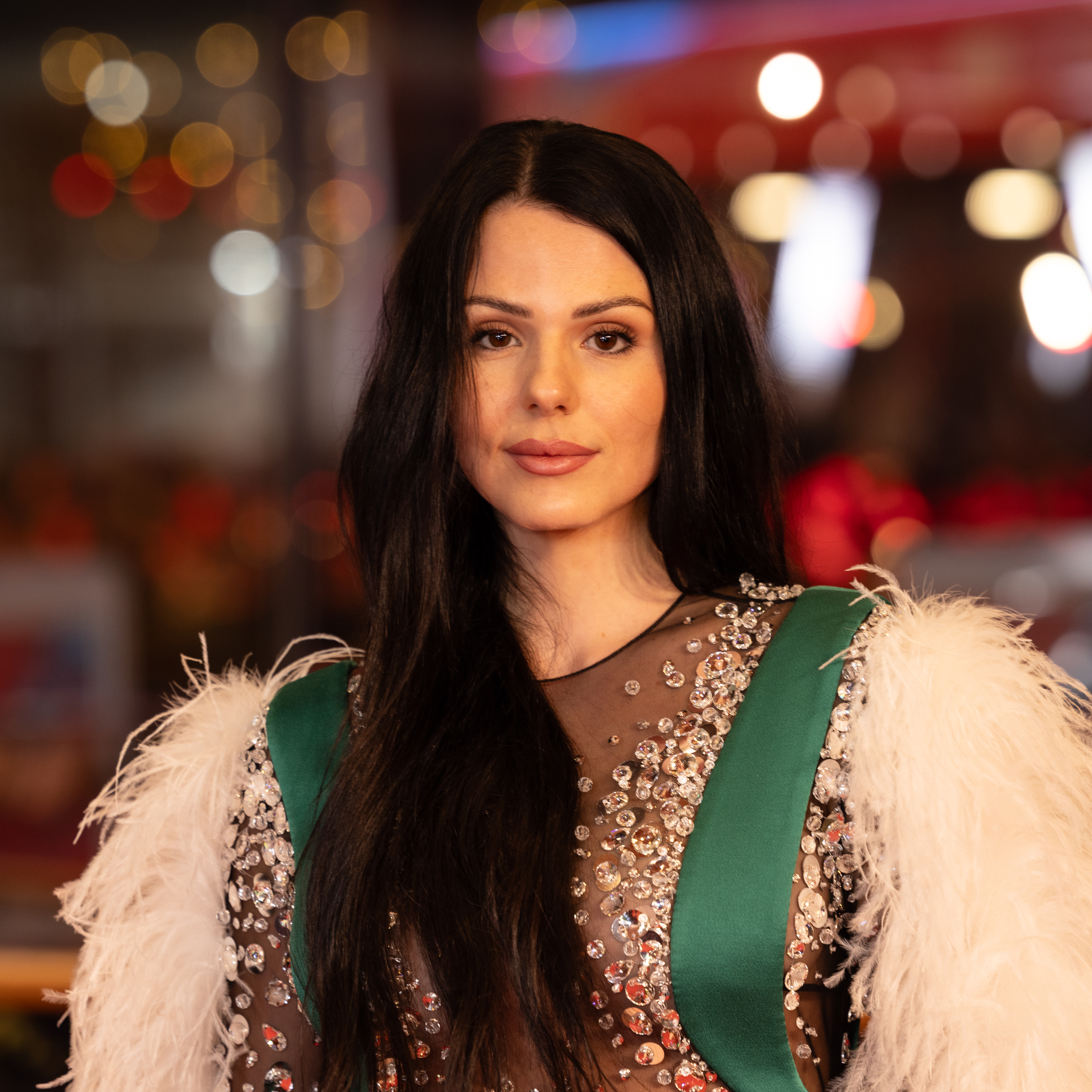
- Ruby O. Fee at the 75th Berlin International Film Festival 2025
- Born: Ruby Moonstone Camilla Willow Fee; 7 February 1996 (age 30); Puerto Viejo de Talamanca, Costa Rica
- Education: Béla Bartók Music School
- Occupations: Actress; model
- Years active: 2010-present
- Height: 168 cm (5 ft 6 in)
- Spouse: Matthias Schweighöfer (m. 2026)
- Mother: Camilla Willow

Ruby Moonstone Camilla Willow Fee (born 7 February 1996) is a German actress.

== Early and personal life ==
Fee was born in Costa Rica to a German mother and a British father. She was raised by her single mother, a costume designer, with whom she lived in places such as Bali and India, before they moved to Brazil when she reached school age, where she spent much of her childhood. In 2008, the family moved to Berlin, Germany. She was enrolled at Béla Bartók Music School.

Fee speaks at least three languages fluently, namenly German, English and Portuguese. According to Glamour, she also speaks Spanish and French fluently.

She has been in a relationship with actor and director Matthias Schweighöfer since early 2019, and they appeard together in Army of Thieves (2021) and Brick (2025). The couple married in 2026.

== Career ==
In 2010, Ruby O. Fee's career took off with her leading role as Sophie Kellermann in the television series Allein gegen die Zeit. Her versatility was further showcased in her first feature film, Womb (2010), where she played the teenage Rebecca (played as an adult by Eva Green). She also received a leading role as Laila in the feature film Dandelion – The Cinematic Adventure.

In the summer of 2012, the shooting of a film adaptation of the children's book Die schwarzen Brüder with Moritz Bleibtreu took place, in which Ruby O. Fee took over the role of Angeletta. She then got the role in the TV movie Lotta & the Happy Future, in which she played a sick girl who is lovesick. She received much praise for portraying suspect Sarah in the Tatort episode Happy Birthday, Sarah. In the summer of 2013, Fee appeared in front of the camera for Detlev Buck's film Bibi & Tina as Sophia von Gelenberg.

In 2015, she played one of the leading roles in Andreas Dresen's film As We Were Dreaming, based on the novel of the same name by Clemens Meyer. In 2016, she played the female lead in the two-part historical film Marthe's Secret (D/CZ). In the German psychological thriller Zazy, by Matthias X. Oberg, from 2016, she played the female lead. In the 2019 US-German action film Polar, she played a supporting role alongside Mads Mikkelsen. In Lindenberg! Mach dein Ding (2020), plays Paula aus Sankt Pauli, immortalized in the song "Alles klar auf der Andrea Doria" by Udo Lindenberg.

In 2021, Ruby played the role of Korina in the film Army of Thieves, directed by Matthias Schweighöfer, who also starred in the movie. Fee later starred as Vanessa in the television series Testo, and appeared in the 2025 Netflix film Brick. In 2025 she was named GLAMOUR magazine´s Rising Actor at its Women of the Year awards, and she has founded her own production company with the aim of developing female-led scripts and directing.

== Filmography ==
Key
†	Denotes films that have not yet been released

=== Film ===
Year	Title	Role	Notes
2010	Womb	Rebecca - 9 Years	
2011	Löwenzahn - Das Kinoabenteuer	Laila	
2013	DeAD	Romy	
2013	Die schwarzen Brüder	Angeletta	
2014	Bibi & Tina - Der Film	Sophia von Gelenberg	
2014	Bibi & Tina: Voll verhext!	Sophia von Gelenberg	
2015	Als wir träumten	Sternchen	
2015	Gespensterjäger – Auf eisiger Spur	Lola Tomsky	
2016	Rockabilly Requiem	Debbie	
2016	Zazy	Zazy	
2016	Seitenwechsel	Julia Paschke	
2016	Verrückt nach Fixi	Jessy	
2016	Zazy	—N/a	Associate producer
2017	Die Unsichtbaren - Wir wollen leben	Ruth Arndt	Docudrama
2017	Hard Way - The Action Musical	Emily	Short film
2018	Fünf Freunde und das Tal der Dinosaurier	Melanie	
2019	Sweethearts	Coco	
2019	Polar	Sindy	Video-on-demand
2019	Deine Farbe	Zoe	Video-on-demand
2020	Lindenberg! Mach dein Ding	Paula	
2020	Børning 3	Romy	Video-on-demand
2021	Army of Thieves	Korina Dominguez	Video-on-demand
2025	Brick	Olivia	Video-on-demand
2025	Das Leben der Wünsche †	Jill	Post-production

=== Television ===
Year	Title	Role	Notes
2010–2012	Allein gegen die Zeit	Sophie Kellermann	Main cast
2013	Lotta	Peggy	Episode: "Lotta & die frohe Zukunft"
2013	Letzte Spur Berlin	Helen	Episode: "Ewige Dunkelheit"
2014	Kein Entkommen	Chrissi	TV movie
2013, 2016, 2018	Tatort	Sarah Baumbach, Laura Hartmann, Lollo Sassen	1 episode for each character
2016	Sechs auf einen Streich	Fee Lupine	Episode: "Prinz Himmelblau und Fee Lupine"
2016	Das Geheimnis der Hebamme	Marthe	TV movie
2016	Shakespeares letzte Runde	Desdemona	TV movie
2017	Schuld nach Ferdinand von Schirach	Chiara Ebert	Episode: "Anatomie"
2017	Die Ketzerbraut	Genoveva "Veva" Leibert	TV movie
2018	Der Alte	Valerie Spectre	Episode: "In voller Absicht"
2018	Rosamunde Pilcher	Amy Truman	Episode: "Nanny verzweifelt gesucht"
2019	Morden im Norden	Mia Watzke	Episode: "Heile Familie"
2020	SOKO Leipzig	Lisa Koch	Episode: "Die Falle"
2022	Zimmer mit Stall	Stella	Episode: "So ein Zirkus"
2024–2025	Testo	Vanessa	Main cast

=== Music Videos ===
Year	Artist	Title	Role	Notes
2016	Jacob Whitesides	Focus (Rufus Dipper Remix)	Jessy	Archival Footage from the 2016 film Verrückt nach Fixi

== Awards ==
- 2014: Jupiter Award for Best German TV Actress, for Tatort: Happy Birthday, Sarah
- 2014: Golden Sparrow Award for Best Actor, for The Black Brothers
- 2014: Günter-Strack-Fernsehpreis Award for Tatort: Happy Birthday, Sarah
- 2016: Immenhof Film Award for Best Actress
