= Claudia Schreiber =

German journalist and author (born 1958)

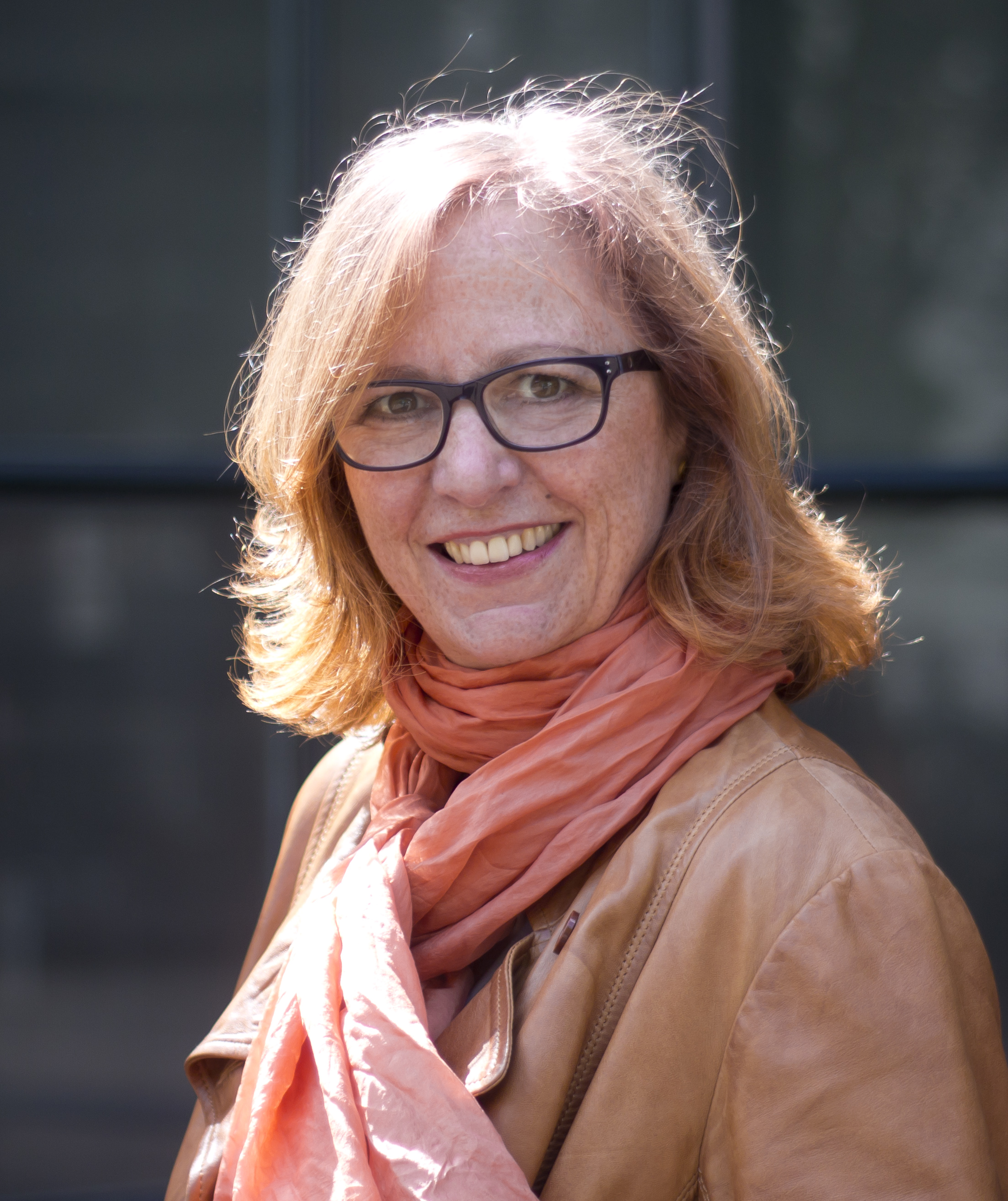
Claudia Schreiber 2013

Claudia Schreiber (born 1958 in Grebenstein, Hesse) is a German journalist and author.

After studying journalism, education science and sociology at the University of Göttingen and University of Mainz, 1979 – 1985, M.A. degree, she worked as editor, reporter and anchorwoman for Südwestfunk (SWF) and Zweites Deutsches Fernsehen (ZDF), (children's newscast logo!, among others) broadcast networks. After stages in Moscow (1992 – 1996) and Brussels (1996 – 1998), she has been making her home in Cologne and is working as a freelance writer.

In her novel Emmas Glück (Emma’s Bliss) of 2003, translated into nine languages, she included motifs from her hometown in northern Hesse. It has been her most successful work so far. With its crisp and witty sentences, its deadpan presentation of the improbable and eccentric and its deep sympathy for its cast of misfits, Schreiber's style in this book somewhat recalls that of Heinrich Böll. A film of this book, directed by Sven Taddicken and starring Jördis Triebel and Jürgen Vogel was released in Germany in 2006; its English title is Emma's Bliss.

Her children's book Sultan und Kotzbrocken (Sultan and Scumbag), first published in 2004, has so far been translated into four languages. It was produced as a theater play in the “Theater Junge Generation” in Dresden in an adaptation by Rüdiger Pape (director) and Jörg Hückler (dramaturgy). The “Theaterkumpanei Ludwigshafen” has produced a bilingual version of the play in an adaptation by Bärbel Maier; they perform it in German and Persian, both in Germany and Iran, at the Fadjr Festival, among others. At the 17th Hamedan Theater Festival ForChirldren&Adults 2010 it won several prices.

Schreiber's book Ihr ständiger Begleiter (Her Constant Companion, subtitle: Fast eine Liebesgeschichte - Almost a Love Story) also draws on her personal history: It is the story of a young woman growing up in a strict and narrow-minded Christian community, as Schreiber did. The novel recounts the heroine's struggle to liberate herself from her pervading relationship with God, who constantly appears to her and with whom she converses familiarly. A Dutch translation of this book appeared in 2007.

Her latest novel Süß wie Schattenmorellen (Sweet as Morello Cherries) is a coming-of-age-story, most of it taking place in a cherry orchard. While in Emma’s Luck Schreiber's topic was the end of life, she writes here about its beginning. A film of this book will be produced by Makido Production/Wien und Weimar, directed by Manuel Siebenmann. Together with him Claudia Schreiber is writing the script and again adopting her own novel.

== Awards ==
- In 1989, Claudia Schreiber received the “Journalistenpreis Entwicklungspolitik” (“Journalistic Award for Third World Politics”), sponsored by the President of the Federal Republic of Germany.
- Her ZDF television production “Mich hat keiner gefragt – Wie Tony im Westen klarkommt” was awarded the highly respected Prix Jeunesse International for the year 1990.
- In 2006, her novel Emmas Glück (Emma’s Luck) received the Euregio-Schüler-Literaturpreis.
- Zichermann Family Foundation Award for Best Screenplay for Emmas Glück at the 2006 Hamptons International Film Festival, together with Ruth Toma.
- Her children's book Sultan und Kotzbrocken (Sultan and Scumbag) was included in the list of Germany's Seven Best Books for Young Readers in March and April, 2004.
- In 2003, Claudia Schreiber received a grant for screenplay development from the Commissioner of the German Federal Government for Culture and Media.
- In 2008, she was awarded a work stipend at the International Writers Colony, Ledig House, in Art Omi, N.Y.
- 2011 „Scrivere per Amore“ for best Lovestory in Italy for La felicità di Emma (Emmas Glück), Verona
- 2012 Claudia Schreiber received a grant for screenplay development from the German Federal Film Board (FFA) for adaption Süß wie Schattenmorellen, now called „Kirsche“, (together with Manuel Siebenmann)

== Works ==
- Moskau ist anders (Moscow Is Different), non-fiction book published under the author's name Claudia Siebert, Claassen, 1994, ISBN 978-3-546-00088-8
- Der Auslandskorrespondent (The Foreign Correspondent), novel published under the author's name Claudia Siebert, Kiepenheuer & Witsch, Cologne, 1997, ISBN 978-3-462-02660-3
- Emmas Glück (Emma’s Bliss), novel, Reclam, Leipzig, 2003, ISBN 978-3-379-00805-1
- Sultan und Kotzbrocken (Sultan and Scumbag), children's book, Hanser, Munich, 2004, ISBN 978-3-446-20435-5
- Ihr ständiger Begleiter (Her Constant Companion), novel, Piper, Munich/Zürich, 2007, ISBN 978-3-492-04973-3
- Heimische Männerarten. Ein Bestimmungsbuch (Indigenous Species of Men. A Field Guide), Sanssouci/Hanser, Munich, 2009, ISBN 978-3-8363-0168-8
- Oben Himmel unten Gras. Ein Kuhspiel in sechs Akten (Sky Above Grass Below. A Cow Play in Six Acts), Artemis&Winkler, Mannheim, 2010, ISBN 978-3-538-07289-3
- Heimische Frauenarten. Ein Bestimmungsbuch (Indigenous Species of Women. A Field Guide), Sanssouci/Hanser, Munich 2010, 978-3-8363-0226-5
- Süß wie Schattenmorellen (Sweet as Morello Cherries), novel, Kein & Aber, Zürich and Berlin, 2011, ISBN 978-3-0369-5600-8
- Beipackzettel zum Mann : Risks and sideeffekts of love. Humor. Hanser Verlag 2012, ISBN 978-3-8363-0327-9
