= Alexander Scheer =

German actor (born 1976)

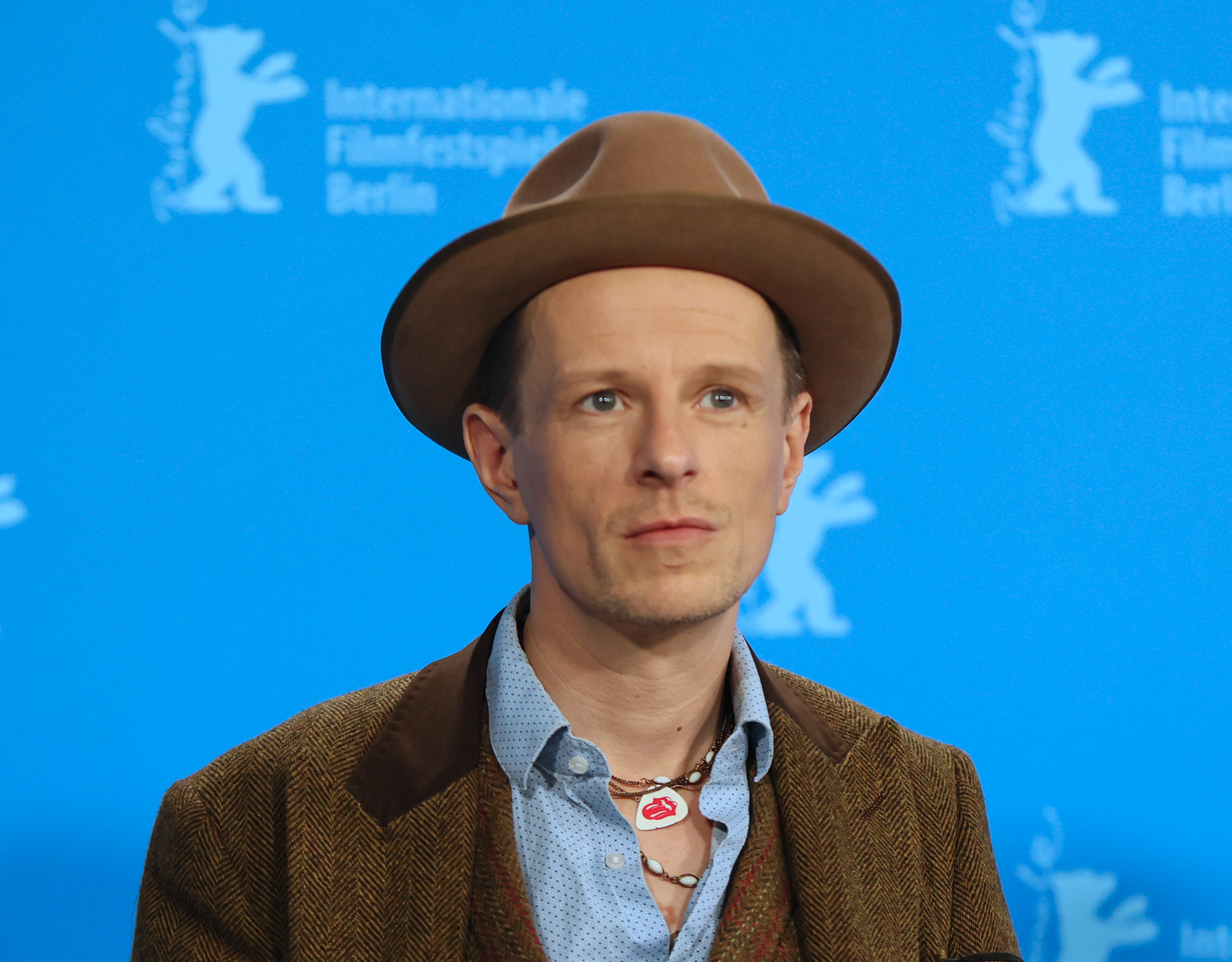
- Scheer at the 72nd Berlin International Film Festival, 2022
- Born: 1 June 1976 (age 49); East Berlin, East Germany
- Occupations: Actor; musician
- Years active: 1999–present
- Partner: Esther Perbandt (former)

Alexander Scheer (born 1 June 1976 in East Berlin) is a German actor and musician. He has won several national awards for his performances in film and theater, including one German Film Award for "Best Actor in a Leading Role" and one Bavarian Film Award for "Best Actor", both in the year 2019.

== Biography ==
Scheer studied at Georg-Friedrich-Händel-Gymnasium in Berlin with main focus on music. In addition to the singing, he played piano and drums in different bands. He left school after the 11th grade and then took up various occupations. He also performed in commercials during this period and turned their own amateur films with his friends. The film series "American Showdown" by André Jagusch, when Scheer stood in front of the camera, became a small festival hit and was shown, for example, at the Werkstatt der Jungen Filmszene (Workshop of the young film scene) and at the Open Air Filmfest Weiterstadt (Weiterstadt Open Air Film Festival). During a casting, he was discovered by the director Leander Haussmann, who cast him in his 1999 film Sonnenallee. After the shooting, Scheer and Haußmann followed to the Schauspiel Bochum theater. There he played among other things in various plays such as Much Ado About Nothing, Leonce and Lena, and The Tempest.

As a result, he worked with the directors like Christoph Marthaler, Frank Castorf, and Stefan Pucher, played in theaters such as "Berlin Alexanderplatz", "the idiot" at the Volksbühne Berlin, and "The Seagull" at the Deutsches Schauspielhaus in Hamburg. For his acting performances, he was awarded the Ulrich-Wildgruber-Preis (the Ulrich Wildgruber prize). For the personification of the English Shakespearean actor Edmund Kean in Frank Castorf's production of the same name in 2009, Scheer was voted Actor of the Year by the theater magazine Theater heute. In addition to his theater engagements, he was also in the national and international productions such as Viktor Vogel – Commercial Man, Eight Miles High, Mrs Ratcliffe's Revolution, and Carlos (miniseries) which its full 5½-hour version was shown out of competition at the 2010 Cannes Film Festival.

To prepare for the portrayal of Keith Richards in the film Eight Miles High, Scheer founded the band The Rockboys which played concerts for one summer. In 2007 he joined Jan Opoczynski as guitarist in his band Der Internationale Wettbewerb. In the following year, he became the front man of the Viennese band Gruppe Pegel. In 2009 he toured Europe as a percussionist with The Whitest Boy Alive. In 2012 he appeared as Mephistopheles in the Johann Wolfgang von Goethe's tragedy play Faust, Part One.

Scheer played a total of 16 years under the direction of Frank Castorf at the Volksbühne Berlin. The decision of the secretary for cultural affairs of Berlin, Tim Renner, caused Castorf's contract as director not to be extended and Scheer was critical of it. He then asked Tim Renner not to enter the theater again, and when Scheer met Renner there in 2018 after a film screening, he poured a glass of beer over his head.

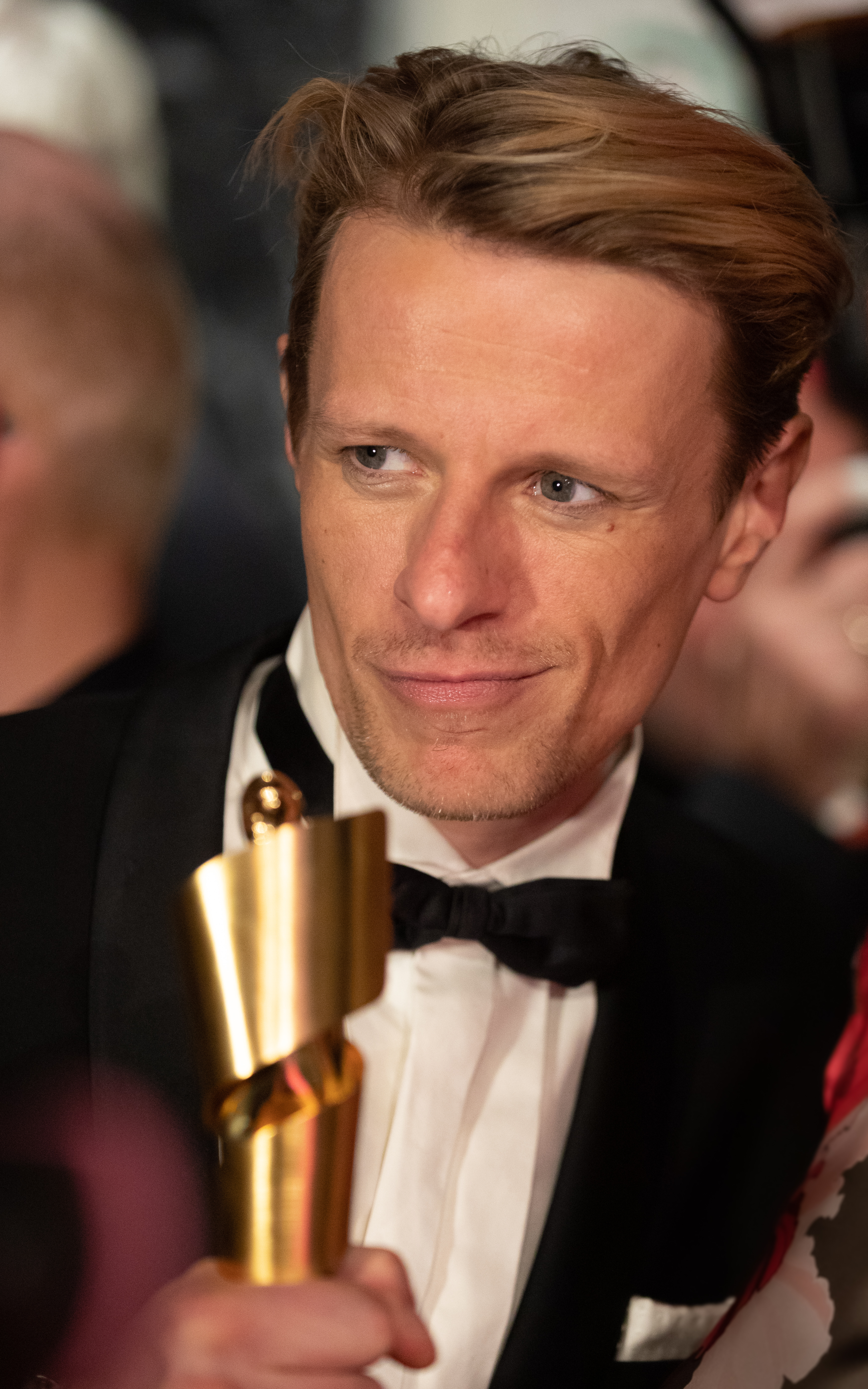
Scheer at the 2019 German Film Awards

In the Andreas Dresen's 2018 biographical film Gundermann about the East German songwriter, rock musician, and skilled excavator operator Gerhard Gundermann, Scheer played the title role and sang all the songs himself. For this role, he was awarded German Film Award (Deutscher Filmpreis) the most important cinema awards in Germany and the most highly endowed German cultural awards, for the Best Actor in a Leading Role in 2019.

In the television series Wir Kinder vom Bahnhof Zoo, he embodied the British musician David Bowie.

Scheer was in a long-term relationship with the fashion designer Esther Perbandt.

== Filmography ==
=== Film ===
Year	Title	Role	Notes
1999	Sonnenallee	Micha Ehrenreich	
2001	Viktor Vogel – Commercial Man	Viktor Vogel	
2001	Getting My Brother Laid	Manu	
2006	Lulu	Walter Schwarz	TV film
2006	Burning Heart	Kurt	TV film
2007	Eight Miles High	Keith Richards	
2008	Meine fremde Tochter	Markus Bergkamp	TV film
2008	Tangerine	Tom	
2009	12 Paces Without a Head	Herman Lange	
2010	At Ellen's Age	Bennett	
2010	Carlos	Johannes Weinrich	Film and TV miniseries
2011	Schief gewickelt	Vincent	TV film
2011	When Santa Fell to Earth	Niklas Julebukk	Christmas film
2012	Eine Hand wäscht die andere	Jakob Kronibus	TV film
2013	West	Hans Pischke	
2014	Fiddlesticks	GKF-Manager	
2015	Punk Berlin 1982	Blixa Bargeld	
2016	Scrappin'	Rambo Weiler	
2016	Lou Andreas-Salomé, The Audacity to be Free	Friedrich Nietzsche	
2016	Goodbye Berlin	Judge	
2017	Schnitzel geht immer	Klaus Ullmann	film
2017	The Young Karl Marx	Wilhelm Weitling	
2017	Pirates of the Caribbean: Dead Men Tell No Tales	Young Edward Teague	
2018	54 Hours	Dieter Degowski	film
2018	Gundermann	Gerhard Gundermann	
2018	Wach		
2019	The Aftermath	Siegfried Leitmann	
2020	Enfant Terrible	Andy Warhol	
2021	Blood Red Sky	Eightball	
2022	Rabiye Kurnaz vs. George W. Bush	Bernhard Docke	
2022	Das Wunder von Kapstadt	Christiaan Barnard	TV film
2023	Blood & Gold	Obersturmbannführer von Starnfeld	
2025	Köln 75	Manfred Eicher	
2025	Leonora in the Morning Light	Max Ernst	

=== Television series ===
Year	Title	Role	Notes
1999	Tatort	Michael Grabowski	episode Tödliches Labyrinth
2003–2005	Berlin, Berlin	Lenny	60 episodes
2004	SK Kölsch	Beck	episode Schmock
2005	The Eagle: A Crime Odyssey	Betjenten	episodes 9 and 10 (Kronos)
2009	Stralsund	Wolf Broder	episode Mörderische Verfolgung
2012	Nachtschicht	Marvin Weber	episode Geld regiert die Welt
2014	Alarm für Cobra 11 – Die Autobahnpolizei	Leonid Tessla	season 18, episode No. 261 Revolution
2014	Letzte Spur Berlin	Sir	episode Machtspiele
2014	Tatort	Donny	episode Im Schmerz geboren
2015	Tatort	Matthias Harries	episode Niedere Instinkte
2015	Kommissar Marthaler	Jörg Gessner	episode Ein allzu schönes Mädchen
2015	Blochin	Kirill Korolyov	episode Das letzte Kapitel
2016	Nachtschicht	Marvin Weber	episode Ladies First
2016	Morgen hör ich auf	Hauptkommissar Schnabelbach	3 episodes
2020	Sløborn	Nikolai Wagner	14 episodes
2020	Hausen	Kater	8 episodes
2021	Wir Kinder vom Bahnhof Zoo	David Bowie	2 episodes

== Awards ==
- 2006: Der Faust (a German theater prize), the best performer of a drama performance (nomination)
- 2008: Ulrich-Wildgruber-Preis (a German theater prize), originality and best actor
- 2009: Schauspieler des Jahres, honorary title by the German magazine Theater heute, for Kean
- 2018: Günter-Rohrbach-Filmpreis (a German film awards), best actor for his role in Gundermann
- 2019: Bavarian Film Awards, best actor for Gundermann
- 2019: Berliner Kunstpreis (Berlin Art Prize) for performing arts (Darstellende Kunst)
- 2019: German Film Award – "Best Actor in a Leading Role" for Gundermann
