= Werner Walde =

German politician (1926–2010)

- Walde in 1984

First Secretary of the Socialist Unity Party in Bezirk Cottbus
- In office 1 June 1969 – 9 November 1989
- Second Secretary: Hans Wetzel; Albrecht Schauerhammer
- Preceded by: Albert Stief
- Succeeded by: Wolfgang Thiel
Volkskammer
Member of the Volkskammer for Bezirk Cottbus
In office 29 October 1976 – 16 November 1989
Preceded by	Herbert Warnke
Succeeded by	Karin Winkel
Constituency	Hoyerswerda, Senftenberg Weißwasser
In office 29 November 1971 – 29 October 1976
Preceded by	Albert Stief
Succeeded by	Helga Labs
Constituency	Bad Liebenwerda, Finsterwalde, Herzberg, Jessen, Luckau, Lübben

Personal details
- Born: Werner Walde; 12 February 1926 Döbeln, Free State of Saxony, Weimar Republic
- Died: 26 June 2010 (aged 84) Cottbus, Brandenburg, Germany
- Party: SED-PDS (1989–1990)
- Other political affiliations: Socialist Unity Party (1946–1989); Social Democratic Party (1946)
- Education: "Karl Marx" Party Academy (Dipl.-Ges.-Wiss.); Hochschule für Ökonomie Berlin (Dipl.-Ök.)
- Occupation: Politician; Party Functionary; Teacher
- Awards: Verdienstmedaille der DDR; Patriotic Order of Merit, 1st class; Hero of Labour; Order of Karl Marx; Kampforden „Für Verdienste um Volk und Vaterland“; Distinguished Service Medal of the National People's Army
- Central institution membership: 1976–1989: Candidate member, Politburo of the Central Committee; 1971–1989: Full member, Central Committee; Other offices held: 1966–1969: Second Secretary, Socialist Unity Party in Bezirk Cottbus; 1961–1964: First Secretary, Socialist Unity Party in Senftenberg district

Werner Walde (12 February 1926 – 26 June 2010) was a German politician and party functionary of the Socialist Unity Party (SED).

Throughout the 1970s and 1980s, he served as First Secretary of the SED in Bezirk Cottbus, the GDR's coal and energy Bezirk, and eventually became a candidate member of the SED Politburo.

== Life and career ==
Walde came from a working-class family. After attending elementary school in Döbeln-Großbauchlitz, he completed training as an administrative employee from 1940 to 1943. He held leadership positions in the German Youth and the Hitler Youth. From June 1943 to April 1945, he was deployed in the Reich Labor Service in Poland, France, and the Netherlands, ultimately as the head foreman. In April 1945, he was conscripted into the Wehrmacht as a soldier and was captured in early May 1945 in Hagenow, initially by American forces, later ending up in British captivity from June to July 1945 in Eutin.

After his release, he worked as a farm laborer for a farmer in Westerode until August 1945. He subsequently worked as an employee of the Social Security Fund in Döbeln until December 1950. In 1945, he became a member of the Free German Trade Union Federation (FDGB) and was a member of the trade union leadership at his workplace from 1946.

=== Early political career ===
In February 1946, he joined the Social Democratic Party (SPD), which was forcibly merged with the Communist Party of Germany (KPD) to form the Socialist Unity Party of Germany (SED) April, and in 1948, he joined the Free German Youth (FDJ).

In 1950, he attended the local SED Party School in Meißen. Afterward, Walde became a full-time SED party functionary, initially as assistant and teacher at the Meißen Party School, moving up to become deputy principal of the Bezirk Cottbus SED Party School in 1953, briefly serving as acting principal.

=== Bezirk Cottbus SED career ===
From 1954 to 1960, he pursued a distance learning program at the SED's "Karl Marx" Party Academy in Berlin, graduating with a diploma in social sciences (Dipl.-Ges.-Wiss.). Concurrently, he worked as a staff member and department head of the Bezirk Cottbus SED.

In August 1961, he was made First Secretary of the SED in the mostly rural Bezirk Cottbus Senftenberg district, joining the SED's nomenklatura.

He stepped down in February 1964 to study at the University of Economics in Berlin, earning a degree in economics (Dipl.-Ök.) in 1966. Walde subsequently rose to the Bezirk Cottbus SED Secretariat, being made Second Secretary, also responsible for Organization and Cadre Affairs, in April.

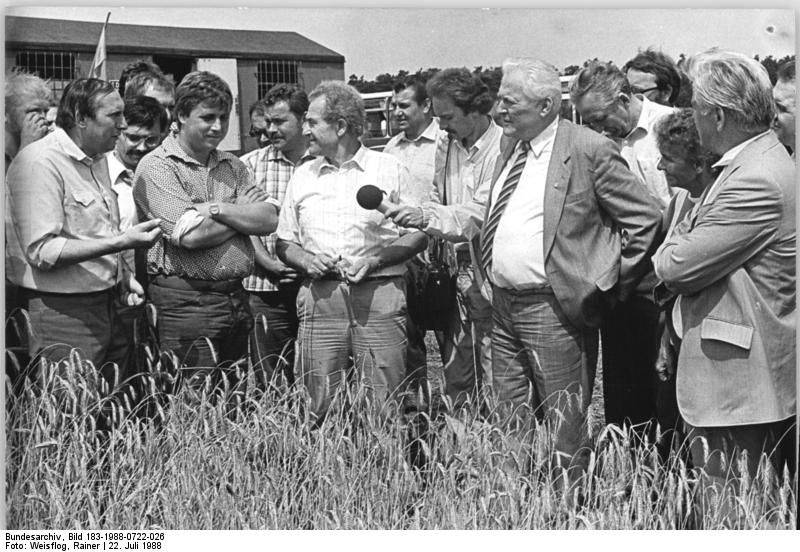
Walde (right) and SED Agriculture Secretary Werner Felfe (right of center) visiting farmers in Schwarze Pumpe in July 1988

On 1 June 1969, Walde rose to the position of the First Secretary of the Bezirk Cottbus SED. Albert Stief, who was ill at the time, was transferred to the Council of Ministers of East Germany as Minister for the Guidance and Control of Bezirk and District Councils.

From 19 June 1971 (VIII. Party Congress) until its collective resignation in December 1989, he was a member of the Central Committee of the SED. From 22 May 1976 (IX. Party Congress) until his resignation in November 1989, he was a candidate member of the Politburo of the Central Committee of the SED, the de facto highest leadership body in East Germany, the Bezirk Cottbus being an important centre for coal and energy.

He additionally became a member of the Volkskammer in 1971, nominally representing rural constituencies in his Bezirk, first the west, then the southeast.

Walde's twenty-year rule of Bezirk Cottbus was viewed was viewed ambivalently. While he lived a modest lifestyle for a top SED functionary and was viewed as sticking up for the districts in his Bezirk, he was known for being a hardliner when it came to military service and those refusing to do so. When it came to art and culture, he was orthodox and clueless, something he later admitted.

Walde was awarded the Patriotic Order of Merit in 1967, 1969 and 1974, the Order of Karl Marx in 1976, and the Hero of Labour title in 1986.

=== Peaceful Revolution ===
On 8 November 1989, on the eve of the fall of the Berlin Wall, Böhme was reelected to the Politburo at the 9th Meeting of the Central Committee. Only a day later, he agreed to step down amidst pressure. The Bezirk Cottbus SED installed reformer Wolfgang Thiel as his successor. Walde consequently resigned from the Politburo he had just been reelected to. He was removed by his party from the Volkskammer a week later, on 16 November 1989.

On 20 January 1990, he was expelled from the now-renamed SED-PDS party in a unanimous vote, the party Central Arbitration Commission citing personal enrichment and his energy policy mismanagement. Nevertheless, Walde was contrite that he can no longer be "useful to the party of the working class".

After the Peaceful Revolution, Walde retired, dying in Cottbus on 26 June 2010.

== In popular culture ==
In the 2018 Gerhard Gundermann biopic Gundermann, Walde was portrayed by Hilmar Eichhorn.
