= Blood and Gold (disambiguation) =

Blood and Gold is a 2001 vampire novel by Anne Rice.

Blood and Gold may also refer to:

== Arts and entertainment ==
- Blood and Gold, a 2001 epic fantasy novel by George R. R. Martin and the second part of A Storm of Swords in several countries
- Blood & Gold, a 2023 action film by Peter Thorwarth

== Sports ==
- The Blood and Gold (French: Les Sang et Or), a nickname for French football club RC Lens
- Blood and Gold (French: Sang et Or), a nickname for French football club ESA Linas-Montlhéry
