= Allein gegen die Zeit =

- Also known as: Alone Against Time
- Genre: Action/Adventure; Teen drama
- Created by: Ceylan Yildirim; Silja Clemens; Stephan Rick
- Starring: Timon Wloka; Janina Fautz; Timmi Trinks; Uğur Ekeroğlu; Ruby O. Fee; Peter Lohmeyer
- Composers: Pivo Deinert; Hans Hafner
- Country of origin: Germany
- Original language: German
- No. of seasons: 2
- No. of episodes: 26

Production
- Producers: Ceylan Yildirim; Martin Hofmann
- Running time: 25 minutes approx.

Original release
- Network: KI.KA
- Release: 3 February 2010 – 4 January 2012

Allein gegen die Zeit (Alone Against Time) is a German real-time television series, aired since 2010. Broadcast on KI.KA, structurally, it resembles the American TV series 24. It was followed in 2016 by a special TV movie.

== Plot ==
=== Season 1 ===
The Teenagers Ben, Leo, Jonas, Sophie and Özzi have a detention on a Saturday morning. When their teacher Mr. Funke, Ben's father, leaves the classroom and does not return, the five children go and look for him. While passing another classroom, they realise that a group of criminals took the whole astronomy set hostage. Immediately the five students want to run away to get help, but all exits are blocked. Soon they realise that the gangsters seek to get hold of the "nanotron", which was designed by Mr. Funke to heal cancer. Mr. Funke turns out to be in fact a Professor with the last name Brehmer. Rather than healing, the criminals plan an attack on the heads of state of all European countries, this is possible because the "nanotron" is a device that controls little robots called "nanobots", these can not only destroy cancer cells but also they allow the owner of the "nanotron" to control the mind of his victim. The five children as well as two policemen, the streetgang of Özzi's brother and Sophie's mother manage to interfere the gangsters plan and save Europe from being ruled by an authoritarian ruler. The pupils act in an extraordinary way: Özzi is the technology freak – he hacks computers and builds machines; Sophie is the science genius – she manages to produce an antidote for the "nanobots"; Leo is a martial arts expert; Ben is the primary target of the villains as he is the professor's son, also he is the first person, whose mind gets controlled; Jonas is the show-off in the group, but in the end he proves his courage and loyalty, this saves all the kids in the end.

=== Season 2 ===
In season 2, the five teenagers are on a trip to a lake. Upon arriving there, they are watched by a group of military-like behaving people. When these people kidnap Ben, the others look for him in the forest. They meet up with a dying man. He tells them that if the villains succeed, thousands will die, then he dies himself. Later the 4 pupils find a former GDR military base. They manage to get in, and slowly they begin to uncover the mystery: the villains have added a toxin to about 350 flowers, these flowers are kept in a vacuum, 2 minutes after leaving it they spray the toxic everybody who gets in touch with it dies within 3 hours, however Sophie finds out that a bee sting from a local bee is an antidote. Again the teenagers manage to defeat the villains step by step. The villains this time are led by Alexandre Legard, a terrorist suffering from a light allergy. Legard plans to take revenge on the German government because they destroyed his terror unit 2 years ago. During the season it is revealed that Ben's mother, who was believed to be dead for 2 years, is still alive and also taken hostage by Legard, which is why Ben had been kidnapped. After an exciting showdown the children and their friends stop the contamination of more people and Ben's mother returns home.

== Cast and characters ==
=== Main characters ===
Character	Actor	Seasons	Episode count
Ben Brehmer	Timon Wloka	1-2	26
Leonora "Leo" Largareta	Janina Fautz	1-2	26
Jonas Stürmer	Timmi Trinks	1-2	26
Özgür "Özzi" Delikaya	Uğur Ekeroğlu	1-2	26
Sophie Kellermann	Ruby O. Fee	1-2	26
Herr Funke/Professor Michael Brehmer	Peter Lohmeyer	1-2	25

=== Supporting characters ===
Character	Actor	Seasons	Episode count
Cenk Delikaya	Eralp Uzun	1-2	26
Jacqueline "Jacky" Fritsche	Shalin Tanita Rogall	1-2	24
Lennart "Lenny" Merz	Sascha Chmelensky	1-2	24
Miriam "Miri" Meyer	Alexandra Weis	1-2	24
Tanja Greve	Alwara Höfels	1-2	23
Harald Jakobs	Denis Moschitto	1-2	23
Marvin	Bejean Banner	1-2	10
Max Forck	Tim Wilde	1	13
Rocky	Oliver Wnuk	1	13
Bianca	Emily Behr	1	13
Thomas Kern	Augustin Kramann	1	11
Frau Kellermann	Anika Mauer	1	10
Andreas Schier	Ralph Herforth	1	5
Frau Dehning	Julika Jenkins	1	4
Johann Bauer	Florian Martens	1	3
Paul	Conrad F. Geier	1	13
Basti	Jan Jakob Müller	1	13
Tobias	Dorian Brunz	1	13
Bodo	Nenad Lucic	1	13
Boris	Thomas Arnold	2	13
Götz	Paul Maaß	2	12
Julio	Moritz Gaa	2	11
Vadim	Timur Isik	2	11
Tom	Mirko Lang	2	11
Lasinski	Arnd Klawitter	2	10
Martin Vogt	Veit Stübner	2	8
Dorfpolizist HaJo (village policeman HaJo)	Ronald Kukulies	2	8
Alexander Legard	Richard Sammel	2	7
Elisabeth Genthin	Julia Jäger	2	7
Marius	Mickey Hardt	2	7
Dr. Crohn	Dietrich Hollinderbäumer	2	6
Laurenz Georgi	Hartmut Volle	2	5
Innenminister (Interior Minister)	Lennardt Krüger	2	5
Carla Brehmer	Suzan Anbeh	2	4
Frank Brandner	Peter Prager	2	4
Schneider	Dirc Simpson	2	5
Wolters	Alexander Sternberg	2	3
Einbrecher (Burglar)	Thomas Jester	2	5
Wolf Weller	Steffen Groth	2	3
Agent	Philipp Mauritz	2	2
Agent	Lars Löllmann	2	2
Polizist	Armin Dillenberger	2	2
Polizist	Cyrus David	2	2
Bundespräsidentin (Federal President)	Henriette Gonnermann	2	1

== Episodes ==
=== Season 1: 2010 ===
Series #	Episode #	Title	Original air date	Written by	Directed by
01	01	08:00	February 3, 2010	Silja Clemens & Stephan Rick	Stephan Rick
02	02	09:00	February 4, 2010	Silja Clemens	Stephan Rick
03	03	10:00	February 8, 2010	Silja Clemens	Stephan Rick
04	04	11:00	February 9, 2010	Catharina Junk	Stephan Rick
05	05	12:00	February 10, 2010	Catharina Junk & Michael Demuth	Stephan Rick
06	06	13:00	February 11, 2010	Silja Clemens & Michael Demuth	Stephan Rick
07	07	14:00	February 15, 2010	Silja Clemens	Stephan Rick
08	08	15:00	February 16, 2010	Catharina Junk	Stephan Rick
09	09	16:00	February 17, 2010	Catharina Junk	Andreas Morell
10	10	17:00	February 18, 2010	Catharina Junk	Andreas Morell
11	11	18:00	February 22, 2010	Catharina Junk & Michael Demuth	Andreas Morell
12	12	19:00	February 23, 2010	Silja Clemens & Michael Demuth	Andreas Morell
13	13	20:00	February 24, 2010	Silja Clemens	Andreas Morell

=== Season 2: 2011-2012 ===
Series #	Episode #	Title	Original air date	Written by	Directed by
14	01	08:00	December 26, 2011	Ceylan Yildirim, Michael Demuth & Oke Stielow	Andreas Morell
15	02	09:00	December 27, 2011	Ceylan Yildirim, Michael Demuth & Oke Stielow	Andreas Morell
16	03	10:00	December 27, 2011	Ceylan Yildirim, Michael Demuth & Oke Stielow	Andreas Morell
17	04	11:00	December 28, 2011	Ceylan Yildirim, Michael Demuth & Oke Stielow	Andreas Morell
18	05	12:00	December 28, 2011	Ceylan Yildirim, Michael Demuth & Oke Stielow	Andreas Morell
19	06	13:00	December 29, 2011	Ceylan Yildirim, Michael Demuth & Oke Stielow	Andreas Morell
20	07	14:00	December 29, 2011	Ceylan Yildirim, Michael Demuth & Oke Stielow	Andreas Morell
21	08	15:00	January 2, 2012	Ceylan Yildirim, Michael Demuth & Oke Stielow	Andreas Morell
22	09	16:00	January 2, 2012	Ceylan Yildirim, Michael Demuth & Oke Stielow	Andreas Morell
23	10	17:00	January 3, 2012	Ceylan Yildirim, Michael Demuth & Oke Stielow	Andreas Morell
24	11	18:00	January 3, 2012	Ceylan Yildirim, Michael Demuth & Oke Stielow	Andreas Morell
25	12	19:00	January 4, 2012	Ceylan Yildirim, Michael Demuth & Oke Stielow	Andreas Morell
26	13	20:00	January 4, 2012	Ceylan Yildirim, Michael Demuth & Oke Stielow	Andreas Morell
