= Henryk from the Back Row =

- Directed by: Andreas Dresen
- Written by: Andreas Dresen
- Produced by: Andreas Leusink
- Edited by: Jörg Hauschild
- Release dates: February 12, 2012 (Berlinale); September 6, 2012 (Germany)
- Running time: 93 minutes
- Country: Germany
- Language: German

Henryk from the Back Row (German: Herr Wichmann aus der dritten Reihe) is a German documentary film directed by Andreas Dresen. The film was released in 2012 and follows the CDU politician Henryk Wichmann as a member of the Landtag of Brandenburg.

== Production ==
Wichmann was previously the subject of Dresen's documentary Herr Wichmann von der CDU. After Wichmann was elected to the Landtag of Brandenburg in 2009, Dresen had the idea to direct a sequel. Dresen followed Wichmann for one parliamentary year and produced around 100 hours of uncut material, which he edited down to 1.5 hours of uncommented film.

The film premiered on February 12, 2012, at the 62nd Berlin International Film Festival in the Panorama section.

== Reception ==
- Filmkunstfest Mecklenburg-Vorpommern 2012: Audience award
