= West (2013 film) =

2013 German drama film

- Film poster
- Directed by: Christian Schwochow
- Written by: Heide Schwochow; Julia Franck (novel)
- Produced by: Thomas Kufus; Barbara Buhl
- Starring: Jördis Triebel; Tristan Göbel; Alexander Scheer; Jacky Ido
- Cinematography: Frank Lamm
- Edited by: Jens Klüber
- Music by: Lorenz Dangel
- Distributed by: Main Street Films
- Release dates: August 25, 2013 (Montréal World Film Festival); November 7, 2014 (USA)
- Running time: 102 minutes
- Country: Germany
- Language: German

West (German: Westen) is a 2013 German drama film directed by Christian Schwochow and written by his mother Heide Schwochow. The film is based on the German novel Lagerfeuer by Julia Franck. Westen had its premiere at the 25th Montreal World Film Festival and was released in the United States on November 7, 2014.

== Plot ==
The film tells the story of the East German Nelly Senff and her young son Alexej, who emigrate to the Federal Republic of Germany in the late 1970s, three years after Nelly's boyfriend Wassilij was killed in an auto accident. In the west, she wants to start a new life, but at first she and Alexej land at Marienfelde refugee transit camp in West Berlin. There, Allied intelligence agencies interrogate Nelly and demand information about her dead boyfriend, who is suspected to have been a spy.

== Cast ==
- Jördis Triebel as Dr. Nelly Senff
- Tristan Göbel as Alexej Senff
- Jacky Ido as John Bird - CIA Agent
- Anja Antonowicz as Krystyna Jablonowska
- Ryszard Ronczewski as Jakub as Krystynas Vater
- Andreas Nickl as Gerd Becker
- Polina Voskresenskaya as Jelena
- Alexander Scheer as Hans Pischke
- Hendrik Arnst as Pförtner Neumann
- Michael Benthin as Arthur Wilhelm
- Tatjana Berges as Großmutter von Jelena
- Angelika Böttiger as Dame vom ärztlichen Dienst
- Winnie Böwe as Susanne
- Stefan Lampadius as Jürgen Lüttich
- Gabriele Schulze as Frau Breitscheit
- Michael Witte as Joachim Fierlinger
- Tania Carlin as Britische Geheimdienstlerin in Zivil
- Rike Eckermann as Britische Geheimdienstlerin
- Carlo Ljubek as Wassilij
- Diana Maria Breuer as Beamtin
- Hacky Rumpel as Nachbar
- Luise Weiß as Kellnerin

== Awards and nominations ==
- 2012: German Film Awards - Film Award in Gold-nomination in the category Best Screenplay - Unproduced for Heide Schwochow
- 2013: Montréal World Film Festival - Prize Best Actress for Jördis Triebel, FIPRESCI Prize in the category World Competition for Christian Schwochow, Grand Prix des Amériques-nomination in the category World Competition for Christian Schwochow
- 2014: Seattle International Film Festival - Golden Space Needle Award-nomination in the category Best Actress for Jördis Triebel
- 2014: German Film Awards - Film Award in Gold in the category Best Performance by an Actress in a Leading Role for Jördis Triebel
