= What We Wanted =

2020 film by Ulrike Kofler

- Official release poster
- German: Was wir wollten
- Directed by: Ulrike Kofler
- Screenplay by: Ulrike Kofler; Sandra Bohle; Marie Kreutzer
- Based on: Der Lauf der Dinge by Peter Stamm
- Produced by: Alexander Glehr; Johanna Scherz
- Starring: Lavinia Wilson; Elyas M'Barek; Anna Unterberger; Lukas Spisser; Iva Höpperger; Fedor Teyml; Marta Manduca
- Cinematography: Robert Oberrainer
- Edited by: Marie Kreutzer
- Production company: Film AG
- Distributed by: Netflix
- Release date: 11 November 2020
- Running time: 93 minutes
- Country: Austria
- Language: German

What We Wanted (German: Was wir wollten) is a 2020 Austrian drama film directed by Ulrike Kofler, in her feature directorial debut, based on the short story Der Lauf der Dinge by Peter Stamm. It was selected as the Austrian entry for the Best International Feature Film at the 93rd Academy Awards, but it was not nominated.

The film was originally set to premiere at the Gartenbaukino in Vienna on 2 November 2020, followed by a theatrical release in Austria on 6 November 2020, but it was delayed due to the COVID-19 pandemic. What We Wanted was ultimately released on Netflix outside Austria on 11 November 2020 and in Austria on 22 December 2020. The film was well received by critics.

== Plot ==
Alice and Niklas are a married couple living in Austria. After several failed attempts at in-vitro fertilization (IVF), their dream of having a child is slowly unraveling. To escape the emotional weight, they decide to take a vacation to Sardinia.

At their holiday resort, they meet a lively family from Germany — a couple with two children. This new friendship intensifies Alice and Niklas's emotional struggles, as they are constantly reminded of what they lack and what they long for.

Tensions simmer between Alice and Niklas as they confront their frustrations, envy, and unspoken grief. The vacation, meant to be a break, becomes a crucible for deep personal and relational reflection. At one point, Alice disappears briefly, causing panic — a symbol of her internal collapse. But she returns, and this moment seems to ground her — it’s a turning point in her grief.

The neighbours' teenage son attempts suicide by taking several over the counter medications, and is found unconscious by the pool. This makes Alice and Niklas reconsider having children.

The film ends quietly, with Alice and Niklas sharing a small, tender moment, the couple seems to have reached a fragile peace — accepting their loss and beginning to redefine their future without children.

The final scene leaves their future open-ended, but it's implied that healing has begun, and they are closer than they were at the start.

== Cast ==
- Lavinia Wilson as Alice
- Elyas M'Barek as Niklas
- Anna Unterberger as Christl
- Lukas Spisser as Romed
- Iva Höpperger as Denise
- Fedor Teyml as David
- Marta Manduca as Sabrina

== See also ==
- List of submissions to the 93rd Academy Awards for Best International Feature Film
- List of Austrian submissions for the Academy Award for Best International Feature Film
