= Emma's Bliss =

- Directed by: Sven Taddicken
- Based on: Emmas Glück by Claudia Schreiber
- Starring: Jördis Triebel; Jürgen Vogel
- Cinematography: Daniela Knapp
- Edited by: Andreas Wodraschke
- Music by: Christoph Blaser; Steffen Kahles
- Release date: 2006
- Running time: 99 minutes
- Country: Germany
- Language: German

Emma's Bliss is a 2006 romantic tragic-comedy that takes place in contemporary rural Germany. The movie, directed by Sven Taddicken, is based on the novel Emmas Glück (now translated into English under the title Emma's Luck) by Claudia Schreiber.

== Plot ==
Upon being informed that he is terminally ill with pancreatic cancer, Max, who works at a used car lot, steals over seventy thousand illegally gained euro (perhaps around $1 million) from Hans, his employer and best friend, and drives off in his Jaguar. Hans gives chase, but quits when it becomes too dangerous. Max crashes the roadside barrier at high speed, ending up in a small pig and poultry farm miles from anywhere. He is lifted unconscious from the wreck by the farmer, Emma, a strong woman who lives alone. She discovers the money, torches the car and tends to Max's injuries, which are not serious.

When Max regains consciousness she lies about the fire and denies having taken anything from the car. Max hides from her the fact that he is dying. He also hides from the police, in the form of the nearby village's young officer, Henner, who has many times offered to marry Emma and help solve her debt problems. Love blooms between Max and Emma after some stumbles, such as his finding out that she had taken the money. She surreptitiously returns the money to him and he, just as surreptitiously, pays off her debts. His sickness worsens and they marry.

A recurring theme is Emma's love for her animals and the way she slaughters a pig by caressing it while gently cutting its throat with a sharp blade. After what is clearly to be Max and Emma's last roll in the hay (literally), she reaches for the knife but then returns it — she cannot bring herself to do the deed. Max then presses it into her hand. The camera then focuses on his face as he loses consciousness.

== Cast ==
- Jördis Triebel - Emma
- Jürgen Vogel - Max
- Hinnerk Schönemann - Henner
- Martin Feifel - Hans Hilfinger
- Nina Petri - Dagmar
- Karin Neuhäuser - Henners Mutter
- Arved Birnbaum - Karl

== Production ==
It was filmed in 2005 in Gummersbach (Berghausen), Rönsahl, Gimborn bei Marienheide and Bergneustadt (a local vehicle displays a license-plate indicating it is from Hochsauerlandkreis in Nordrhein-Westfalen). It was released the following year.

== Awards ==
- Jördis Triebel received an Undine Award for Best Young Character Portraitist in 2006.
- Jürgen Vogel was given the Bavarian Film Prize award for Best Actor in 2007

== DVD ==
The film was released on a DVD in 2008 with German soundtrack and Korean subtitles. The running time is listed as 99 minutes (136 minutes total) NTSC format is given as 16:9. It has been released in Australia (PAL, 16:9) with English subtitles by Gryphon Entertainment.
