= Viktor Vogel – Commercial Man =

2001 film

Viktor Vogel - Commercial Man
- Theatrical release poster
- Directed by: Lars Kraume
- Written by: Lara Kraume; Thomas Schlesinger
- Produced by: Joachim von Vietinghoff
- Starring: Alexander Scheer; Götz George; Chulpan Khamatova
- Cinematography: Andreas Doub
- Edited by: Benjamin Hembus
- Music by: Minus 8
- Production companies: Deutsche Columbia Pictures Filmproduktion; Von Vietinghoff Filmproduktion
- Distributed by: Columbia TriStar Film Distributors International
- Release date: 12 April 2001
- Running time: 108 minutes
- Country: Germany
- Language: German

Viktor Vogel – Commercial Man is a 2001 German comedy film released in 2001 in the US and other countries as Advertising Rules! Directed by Lars Kraume, the cast includes Alexander Scheer, Götz George, and Chulpan Khamatova.

== Plot ==
During a meeting between Opel and the advertising agency Brainstorm, would-be ad man Viktor Vogel sneaks in and volunteers his views on how the agency's new campaign is boring and lacking in irony. As a result, the already dissatisfied Opel executives tell Brainstorm they need to come up with a new idea. After some discussion at Brainstorm the agency decides that they need to find Viktor, whom they threw out after the meeting, and hire him to work on the campaign. Eventually Viktor is partnered with Edward Kaminsky, a veteran ad man who is hoping to retire soon. They begin work on a creative strategy that will help struggling Brainstorm land the lucrative Opel account.

Meanwhile, Viktor meets the artist Rosa and they start a relationship, albeit rocky at first. While at a party that Rosa has thrown, Viktor and Rosa work out an idea for a gallery exhibit where Rosa is in a shopping mart hunting (literally) for her groceries. Sometime later at a meeting with Opel, Viktor accidentally blurts out the idea, which Opel loves, and they are told to begin work on the idea.

Now Viktor, torn between his work and his girlfriend, must decide what is most important to him. Edward tells him that all he has to do is pay her for the idea, but Viktor knows that for this artist the idea is more important than money. However, Rosa's parents feel that they can butt into her life all the time because they give her an allowance and Viktor, seeing this as his opportunity to save himself from his mistake, tries to convince her that this is her opportunity to liberate herself from this cycle. With no exhibit Rosa is now forced to create something for the gallery that already has her booked and she ends up being turned into a dove as a magic act.

In an attempt to help out his new friend, Viktor, Kaminsky tries to get the agency to change from the hunting idea to something else, costing him his job. After this, Eddie hatches a plan which culminates with Viktor defecting from Brainstorm and stealing a client in the process. Viktor tries to patch things up with his girlfriend, but as she is still a dove we are left to our own imagination about how it will work out.

== Cast ==
- Alexander Scheer as Viktor Vogel
- Götz George as Edward Kaminsky
- Chulpan Khamatova as Rosa Braun
- Maria Schrader as Johanna von Schulenberg
- Vadim Glowna as Werner Stahl
- Nele Mueller-Stöfen as Michelle
