= Anna Unterberger =

Italian actress (born 1985)

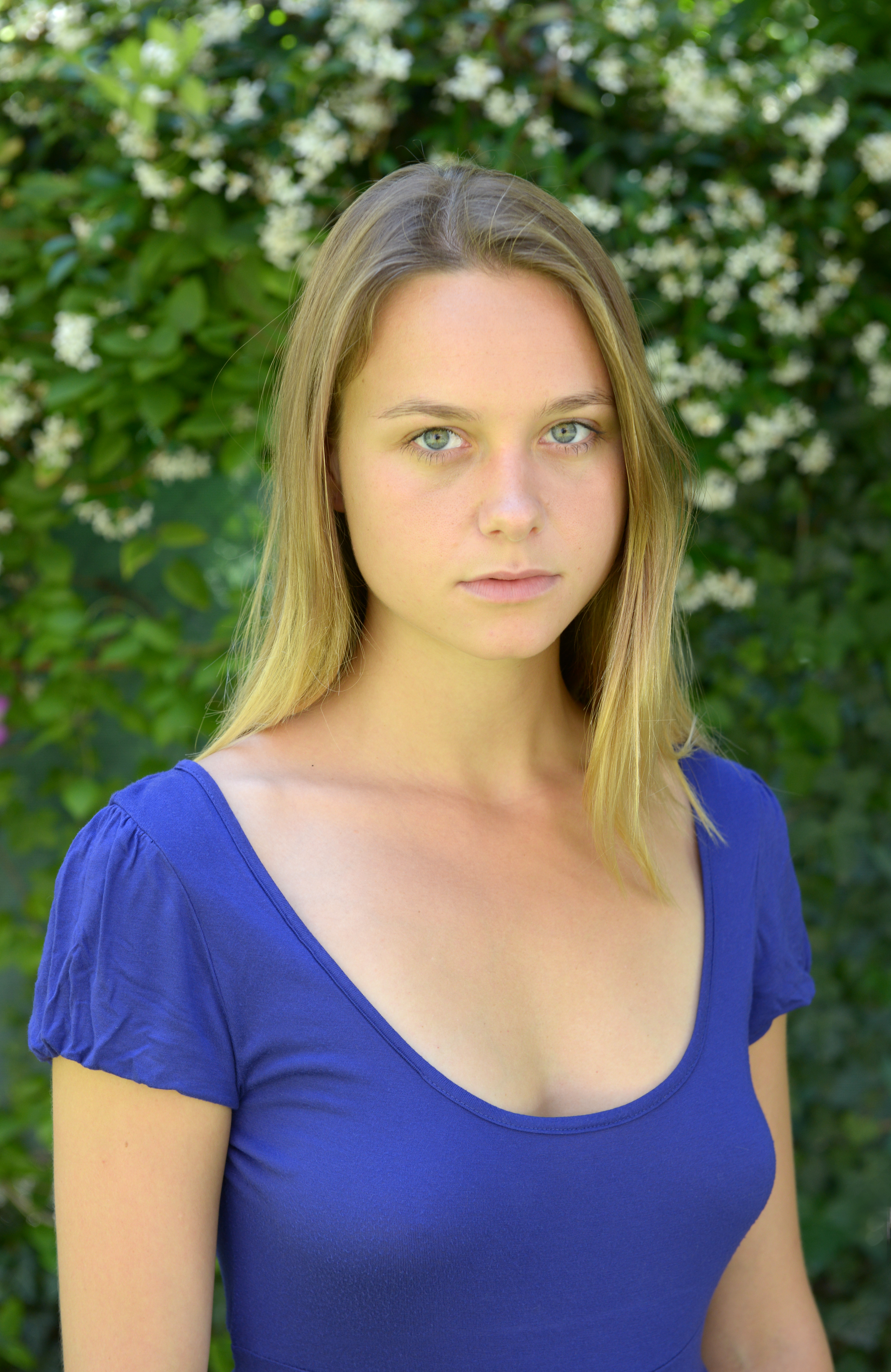
- Unterberger in 2012
- Born: 23 September 1985 (age 40); Bolzano, Italy
- Occupation: Actress

Anna Unterberger (born 23 September 1985) is an Italian actress from Bozen.

== Early life ==
While Anna was a child, her Danish mother worked in a theatre with disabled people. By the time she was in high school she knew she wanted to be an actress. After finishing high school she financed her early drama and vocal training by doing odd jobs. Her native languages are Danish and German, and she is fluent in Italian and English.

From 2005 to 2009, she went to school at the Vienna Conservatory.

== Career ==
Early in her career she acted at the State Theater in Copenhagen, at the Summer Festival in Kottingbrunn, and in the Drachengasse theater in Vienna. In 2008 she also appeared in film productions and in 2009 and 2010 she became an ensemble member at the Salzburger Landestheater.

=== Stage roles ===
In 2007 she got her first acting roles at the Summer Festival in Kottingbrunn as Helena in the Pirate and the Daughter and in Friedrich Dürrenmatt's The Visit. While at the Copenhagen drama school she also acted in Aristophanes Lysistrata.

In 2009, while working at Salzburger Landestheater, she took over the roles of Recha in Gotthold Ephraim Lessing's Nathan the Wise, The Lord in Johann Wolfgang von Goethe's Faust, Peppi in Johann Nestroy's The Evil Spirit Lumpacivagabundus, and Evelyn in Neil Labute's The Measure of All Things.

=== Film and television ===
In 2008 she got her first film role during her training at the Conservatory of Vienna, where she portrayed Gretchen in Urs Odermatt's film Dawn of Evil: Rise of the Reich, based on a play by George Tabori. In 2010, she portrayed Britta in the Oskar Roehler's film Jud Süss – Film ohne Gewissen. In 2012 she was given a guest star role in the German television series The Old Fox. In October 2012 she portrayed Minna in the film adaptation of Daniel Kehlmann's Measuring the World. In 2012 she also played the role of Nadja Bredow in Snow White Must Die. In April 2012, she was a jury member at the Bolzano Film Festival.

She was part of the cast of the 2018 biographical musical film Gundermann, and the 2020 Austrian drama What We Wanted.

== Personal life ==
She currently lives in Salzburg, Vienna, Berlin, or Munich, traveling between them as her job requires her.

== Awards ==
- 2008: Award in the Fidelio talent competition in the category of interpretation
