= Gundermann (film) =

2018 German film

- Theatrical release poster
- Directed by: Andreas Dresen
- Written by: Laila Stieler
- Produced by: Christoph Friedel; Claudia Steffen
- Starring: Alexander Scheer; Anna Unterberger; Axel Prahl; Thorsten Merten; Eva Weißenborn; Benjamin Kramme; Kathrin Angerer; Milan Peschel; Bjarne Mädel; Peter Sodann
- Cinematography: Andreas Höfer
- Edited by: Jörg Hauschild
- Music by: Gerhard Gundermann; Jens Quandt
- Production companies: Pandora Film Produktion; Kineo Filmporduktion; Rundfunk Berlin-Brandenburg; Kinoinitiative Leuchtstoff Arte
- Release date: 23 August 2018 (Germany)
- Running time: 127 minutes
- Country: Germany
- Language: German

Gundermann is a 2018 biographical musical film based on the life of East German singer-songwriter Gerhard Gundermann. Directed by Andreas Dresen and written by Leila Stiehler, the film premiered on 23 August 2018 and won six awards at the subsequent German Film Awards 2019, including Best Film, Best Director and Best Actor.

== Plot ==
Beginning in 1992 with the unmasking of Gundermann as a former unofficial collaborator of the East German security service Stasi, the film shows selected episodes from the life of singer-songwriter and excavator operator Gerhard Gundermann.

Cutbacks show how he involved himself in the politics of the GDR and met his wife Conny. Making him responsible for his shortcoming, Gundermann's father breaks ties with him.

Gundermann's life and environment are marked by contradictions. He finds inspiration for his music while operating the bucket-wheel excavator that produces coal. However, his music is about the beauty of nature that his very work destroys. Even though he is a committed communist, his directness and willfulness clash with the prevalent conformism and lead to his exclusion from the Socialist Unity Party of Germany. He takes up the work as an unofficial collaborator in the hopes of improving working conditions and health and safety protection for his fellow workers. Only after the collapse of the GDR does he realize how much harm he could have caused. At the same time, he learns he too was spied on by friends and acquaintances for the Stasi, although his Stai file has disappeared from the Stasi Records Agency. In an interview, he refuses to apologize in the usual formulaic way that was common for former IMs at the time. He reasons that having read his reports to the Stasi, sometimes referred to as a "perpetrator file" (German: Täterakte), he first and foremost couldn't forgive himself. Instead, he personally reaches out to several of his colleagues and band members, confessing to having been an IM in the past.

As Gundermann becomes a father and his wife expects him to spend less time on tour and on his music, he promises improvement.

In the end, he reconciles with his band members and the audience after his genuine confession about his ties to the Stasi.

== Cast ==
- Alexander Scheer as Gerhard Gundermann
- Anna Unterberger as Conny
- Benjamin Kramme as Wenni
- Eva Weißenborn as Helga
- Kathrin Angerer as Irene
- Peter Schneider as Helmut
- Milan Peschel as Volker
- Bjarne Mädel as Party Secretary
- Axel Prahl as Commanding Officer
- Peter Sodann as Veteran
- Steffen Lehmann as Andy
- Hilmar Eichhorn as Werner Walde
- Thorsten Merten as Puppeteer
- Alexander Hörbe as Staff Member of Gauck Commission
- Alexander Schubert as Head of open-pit mining
- Peter Rappenglück as Hamacher
- Leni Wesselman as Young Nurse
- Hans-Dieter Schütt as Reporter

== Production ==
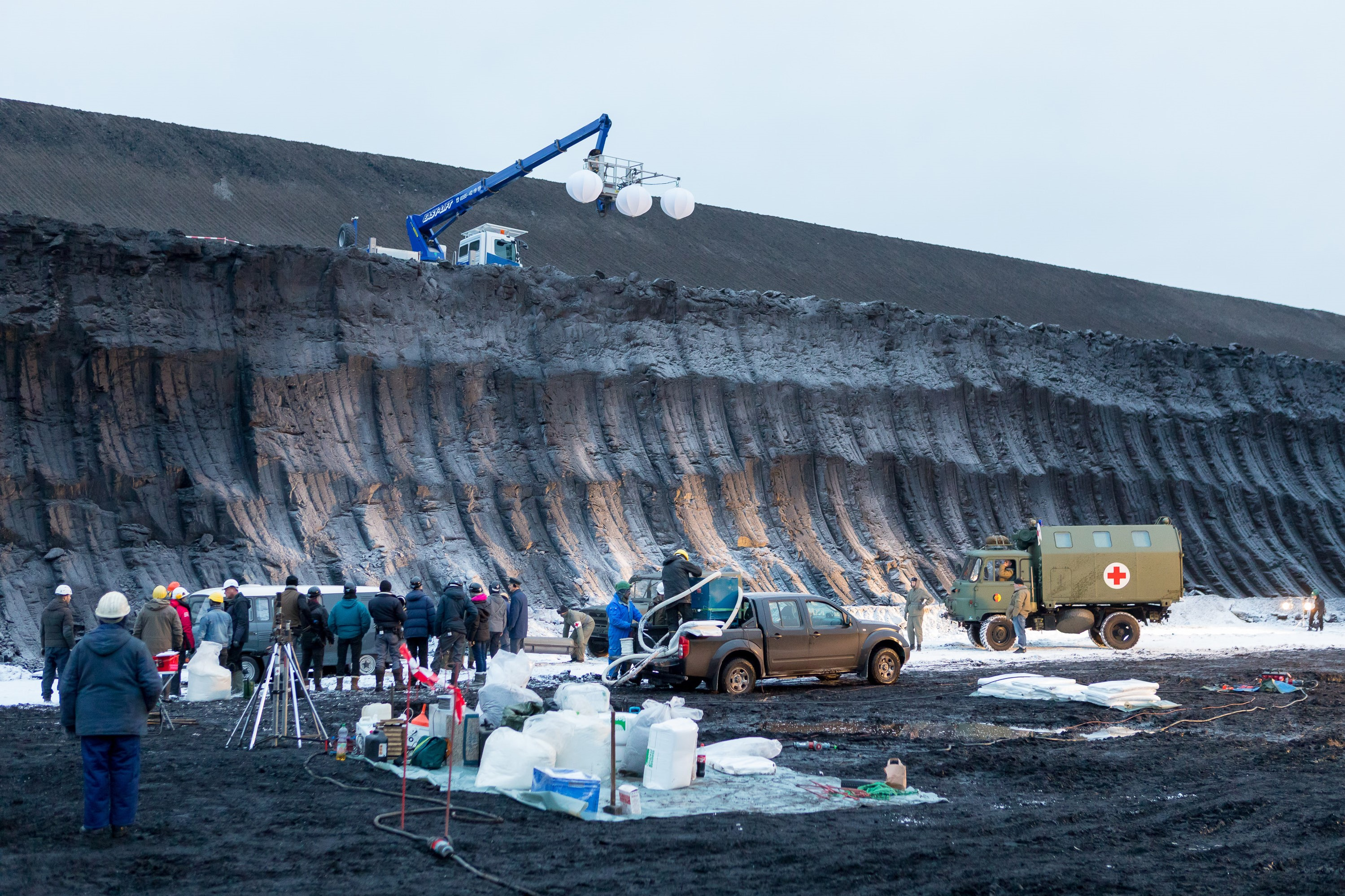
Shooting in Nochten open-pit mine

In 2006, Laila Stieler began to work on the screenplay. Conny Gundermann, the widow of Gundermann, was involved in the development of the script.

Locations included the Nochten open-pit coal mine and its surface installations in Mühlrose in the Lusatian lignite mining region, just under 20 km from Gundermann's former workplace. Additionally, some scenes were shot in Gelsenkirchen-Hassel.

== Music ==
The 13 soundtracks and 2 bonus tracks were released by German music publisher Buschfunk under the title Gundermann – the Soundtrack (German: Gundermann - Die Musik zum Film). Jens Quandt produced the soundtracks which feature vocals from leading actor Alexander Scheer. The instrumentals were performed by Gunnar Ennen (guitar, keyboard), Jens Fricke (guitar), Frenzy Suhr (bass), Sebastian Deufel (drums, grand piano) and Andreas Wieczorek (saxophone).
