= As We Were Dreaming =

2015 German film

- Directed by: Andreas Dresen
- Written by: Wolfgang Kohlhaase; Clemens Meyer
- Starring: Ruby O. Fee
- Release dates: 9 February 2015 (Berlin); 26 February 2015 (Germany)
- Country: Germany
- Language: German

As We Were Dreaming (German: Als wir träumten) is a 2015 German film directed by Andreas Dresen, based on the novel of the same name by author Clemens Meyer. It was screened in the main competition section of the 65th Berlin International Film Festival.

== Plot ==
A group of boys in the early stage of the German reunification: Dani, Rico, Mark, and Paul try out some new things after the recent reunification of Berlin and the fall of East Germany. They steal cars, experiment with drugs, and open their own Techno nightclub.

== Cast ==
- Ruby O. Fee as Sternchen
- Joel Basman as Mark
- Pit Bukowski as Fred
- Merlin Rose as Dani
- Julius Nitschkoff as Rico
- Gerdy Zint as Kehlmann
- Henning Peker as Marks Vater
- Peter Schneider as Trinker Thilo
- Ramona Kunze-Libnow as Frau im Jugendgericht
- Dorothea Walda as Kohlenoma
- Anja Schneider as Frau Dachboden
