= Gerhard Gundermann =

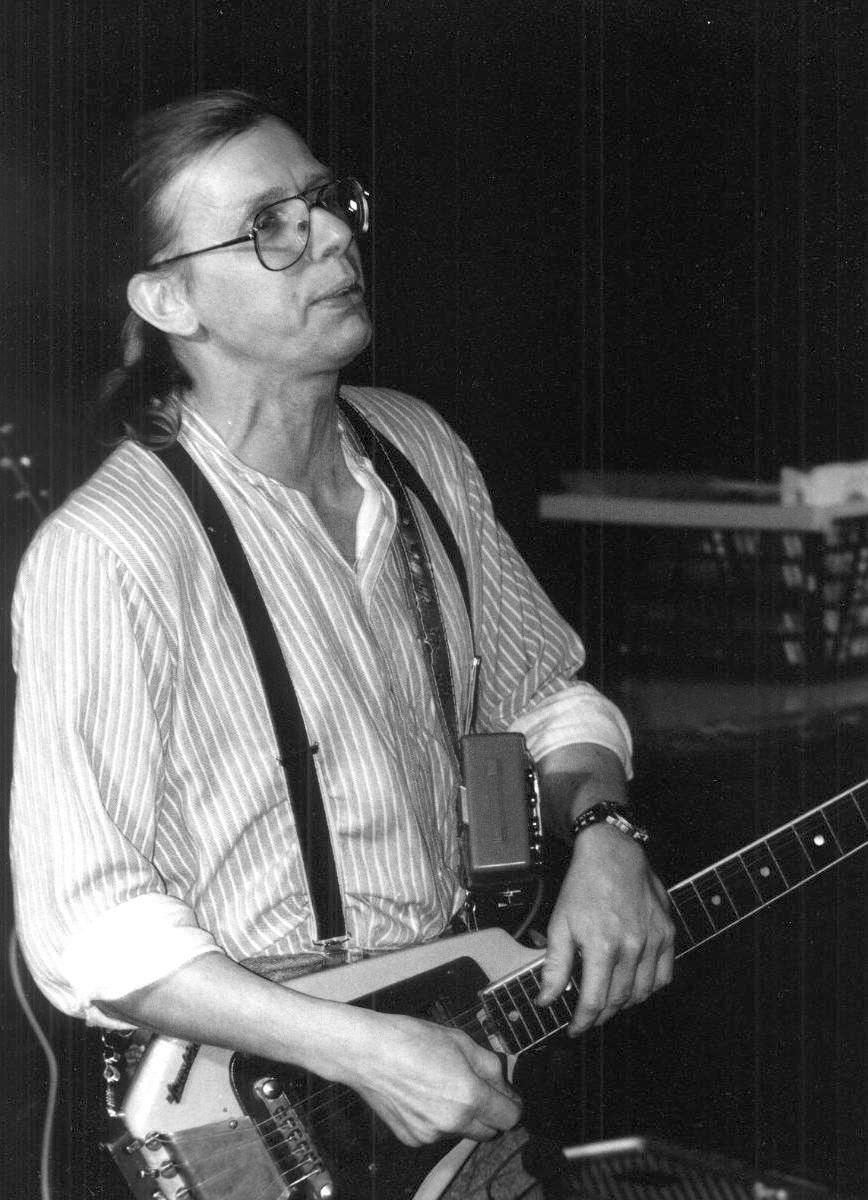
- Gundermann in 1994

Background information
- Also known as: Gundermann
- Born: Gerhard Rüdiger Gundermann; February 21, 1955; Weimar, Bezirk Erfurt, East Germany
- Origin: Hoyerswerda, East Germany
- Died: June 21, 1998 (aged 43) Spreetal, Germany
- Genres: Rock; folk
- Occupations: Bucket-wheel excavator operator, joiner
- Instrument: Guitar
- Years active: 1986–1998
- Label: SPV
- Website: members.aol.com/seilschaft/index2.htm

Gerhard Rüdiger Gundermann, who generally performed as simply Gundermann (February 21, 1955 – June 21, 1998), was a German singer-songwriter and rock musician. A skilled excavator operator, his musical career began in the former East Germany, where he became known for his clever, often melancholic lyrics imbued with social commentary. After German reunification, he became especially popular among former East Germans who felt alienated and marginalized in the reunited country.

== Career ==
Born in Weimar, Gundermann moved with his family to Hoyerswerda in 1967. After completing his secondary education, he studied for a year at the military academy in Löbau, but was expelled in 1975, after which he was forced to seek work in the coal mining area of the Spreetal (in today's Saxony). In 1976 he began evening school, and was recruited by the East German domestic intelligence service, the Stasi, as unofficial collaborator (codename "Grigori"). In 1977 he applied to join the ruling party, the SED, but was asked to leave the following year (after uttering contrary opinions), although this was reduced to a "strong rebuke" after he appealed. In 1983 he married Conny. The following year he was again expelled from the party and also from the Stasi.

Gundermann's first appearances as a singer-songwriter came in 1986, and a year later he won the grand prize and a recording contract in the East German national song contest. His first LP Männer, Frauen und Maschinen (Men, Women, and Machines) appeared in 1988, but in contrast to his solo acoustic performances it was a rock record album with a backing band, with uptempo numbers like "Halte durch" ("Hang in there!"). It included a song of praise for his hometown Hoyerswerda, "Hoy Woy."

After the Fall of the Wall, Gundermann ran unsuccessfully for a parliamentary seat in the Volkskammer in the March 1990 elections as a candidate for the leftist alliance Aktionsbündnis Vereinigte Linke.

Gundermann lived an ascetic lifestyle, eschewing alcohol, drugs, and smoking, and was a committed vegetarian. However, he was a workaholic; besides a full recording and performing schedule, Gundermann continued to work operating a rotary excavator, digging up seams of brown coal. He was worried that his music would lose its authenticity if it became his sole way of life. Perhaps because of overwork exhaustion, Gundermann died of an apoplexy on June 21, 1998, at the age of 43 at his home in Spreetal. He left behind a wife and four children. His decease followed that of his friend and co-musician Tamara Danz, also gone at an age of 43 years, by less than two years.

In 2018, a biographical movie by director Andreas Dresen, Gundermann. Gundermann was personated by actor Alexander Scheer. The biographical film feature film was awarded six German Movie Awards (Deutscher Filmpreis) in 2019 of 10 nominations, among them the "German Oscars" for the Best Film, Best Actor in a Leading Role, Best Screenplay (Laila Stieler) and Best Director.

== Discography ==
- 1988 Männer, Frauen und Maschinen (Men, Women, and Machines)
- 1992 Einsame Spitze (One of a Kind)
- 1993 Der 7te Samurai (The Seventh Samurai)
- 1995 Frühstück für immer (Breakfast For Ever)
- 1997 Engel über dem Revier (Angel Above the Coalfield)
- 1998 Krams – Das letzte Konzert
- 1999 Unplugged (Silly + Gundermann & Seilschaft)
- 2000 Live-Stücke I (currently unavailable due to a legal dispute)
- 2004 Werkstücke II. Die Wilderer
- 2005 Torero... Werkstücke III (Solo/live)
- 2005 Oma Else. Werkstücke IV
- 2008 Alle oder Keiner. Auswahl I
