= Blood & Gold =

2023 film by Peter Thorwarth

- Directed by: Peter Thorwarth
- Written by: Stefan Barth
- Produced by: Christian Becker; Pavel Muller; Mark Nolting; Amara Palacios
- Starring: Robert Maaser; Marie Hacke; Alexander Scheer; Jördis Triebel
- Music by: Jessica de Rooij; Hendrik Nölle
- Distributed by: Netflix
- Release dates: April 21, 2023 (Fantasy Filmfest); May 26, 2023 (Netflix)
- Running time: 100 minutes
- Country: Germany
- Language: German

Blood & Gold is a 2023 film released in Germany on April 21, 2023, at the Fantasy Filmfest, and worldwide on May 26, 2023, on Netflix.

== Plot ==
In the spring of 1945, the Allied armies invade Nazi Germany as the end of World War II draws near. Heinrich, a decorated Wehrmacht veteran, is captured after his desertion attempt and hanged by a platoon of Waffen-SS led by a fanatical and somewhat deranged Obersturmbannführer (lieutenant colonel) von Starnfeld. He is rescued by Elsa, who brings him to her farm home that she shares with her brother Paule, who has Down syndrome. Meanwhile, the SS arrive in the nearby village and begin to search looking for a large amount of hidden gold in a destroyed house previously occupied by a Jewish family much to the protest of his second-in-command Dörfler as he fears that digging for the golds would leave them too exhausted to fight the approaching allied troops from the US and France.

Several SS soldiers with Oberscharführer Dörfler in charge are sent to Elsa's farmhouse to plunder it for supplies. As Heinrich hides in the attic, the SS abuse Paule, and then attempt to rape Elsa. Heinrich intervenes, and in the ensuing melee the soldiers are killed by Heinrich and Elsa, but their Oberscharführer escapes. Heinrich, Elsa, and Paule leave the farmhouse and hide in the forest. However, Paule is troubled by distress to his beloved dairy cow from being left unmilked and goes back overnight to the farm, where he is captured by Dörfler returning there the following morning with a few soldiers and shooting Paule's cow dead for meat.

The SS bring Paule to the local church and abuse him in front of the villagers. He is marched to the top of the church steeple to be hanged. However, Paule pushes one SS soldier from the tower, grabs that man's MP40 and kills the second SS soldier. Paule then begins to fire on the SS in the plaza. Heinrich and Elsa arrive as Paule is killed by von Starnfeld with a sniper rifle. In the ensuing battle Elsa charges at von Starnfeld, firing her pistol until empty. Failing to kill von Starnfeld, Elsa crumbles to the ground in defeat, effectively surrendering herself to the SS. Heinrich and Dörfler meanwhile engage in a running battle across town, with both men wounding the other before Dörfler flees. Heinrich absconds to the house of the widow Irmgardner who aids him. Later that night Irmgardner welcomes the village priest into the house, where he reveals to Heinrich that he had witnessed four townspeople, including the mayor and the scheming Nazi sympathizer Sonja, steal the gold from the rightful owners during the events of Kristallnacht and burn down their home; the priest in turn stole the gold from them and hid it in his church. Heinrich plans to use the gold to draw the SS in and to free Elsa.

Elsa poisons the Obersturmbannführer with his cyanide capsule, and a firefight between the remainder of the SS platoon and Heinrich erupts after he throws a gold bar retrieved from the church into the SS headquarters. Heinrich collapses before he can reunite with Elsa due to blood loss from a shrapnel injury. Dörfler transfuses blood to Heinrich to save his life so that he can locate the gold in the church. However, the priest has already revealed the location of the gold to Sonja and her comrades, though the booby trap on the gold goes off, leaving the Nazi sympathizers dead. Dörfler arrives with Heinrich just after the explosion and murders the priest. Elsa and Irmgardner engage the SS, wherein Irmgardner and Dörfler are killed. The fight ends with the SS defeated, allowing Heinrich and Elsa to leave the village. Sonja regains consciousness, having not been killed earlier, and shoots the last surviving SS soldier, who had hid in the rubble to survive. She drives off unobserved with the stolen gold in a Volkswagen Kübelwagen, but an American Sherman tank crew destroys her vehicle as she is driving through the countryside. The soldiers discover her lying mortally wounded and the gold scattered all around the destroyed car; while at first they consider reporting in the discovery, their sergeant then tells them not to, so the group could split it among themselves instead. Later Heinrich and Elsa are seen arriving at the city of Hagen, where Heinrich has an emotional reunion with his daughter.

== Cast ==
- Robert Maaser as Heinrich
- Marie Hacke as Elsa
- Alexander Scheer as Obersturmbannführer von Starnfeld
- Florian Schmidtke as Oberscharführer Dörfler
- Simon Rupp as Paule
- Jördis Triebel as Sonja
- Jochen Nickel as Priest

=== English dubbing ===
The English version was produced by Roundabout Entertainment in Burbank, California. Jessica Rookeward adapted the script and Jude Prest directed the dub.

Role	Actor	Voice actor
Heinrich	Robert Maaser	Daniel Rashid
Elsa	Marie Hacke	Andria Kozica
Obersturmbannführer von Starnfeld	Alexander Scheer	Christopher W. Jones
Oberscharführer Dörfler	Florian Schmidtke	Jamison Jones
Paule	Simon Rupp	Connor Long
Sonja	Jördis Triebel	Gabrielle Carteris
Priest	Jochen Nickel	Michael C. Pizzuto

== Critical reception ==
On the review aggregator website Rotten Tomatoes, 85% of 13 critics' reviews are positive.

Leslie Felperin of The Guardian gave the film 3 out of 5 stars, describing the film as "effectively a spaghetti western that just happens to unfold in Germany in the last days of the second world war", and finding the last hour of the film to be "predictable but tightly staged and well paced". Felperin recommended Blood & Gold by concluding that "if you’re scrolling through the streaming platform looking for something fresh, it’s not a bad choice for switch-your-brain-off entertainment."

== Bibliography ==
Notes
