= Andreas Dresen =

German film director

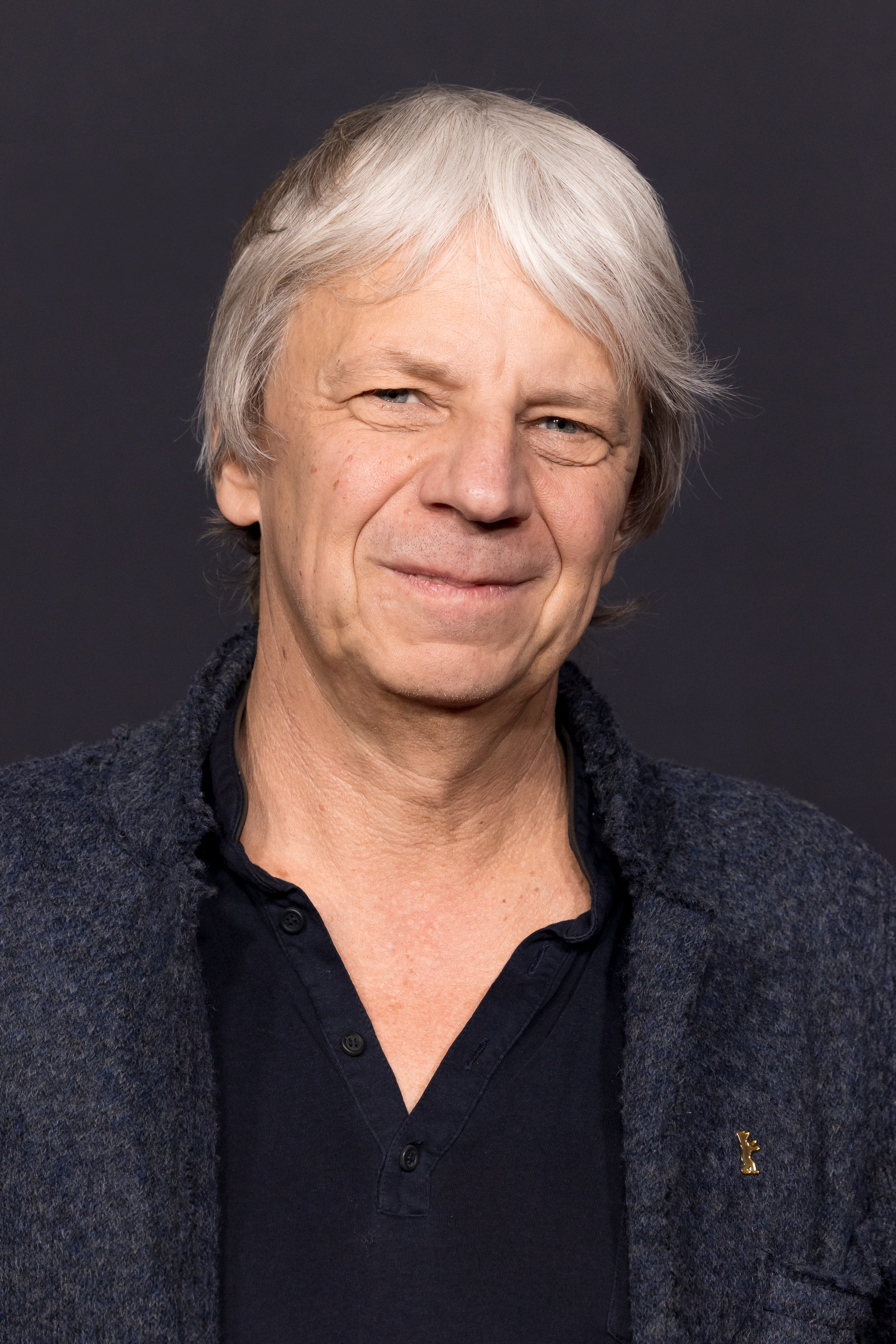
- Dresen 2024
- Born: 16 August 1963 (age 62); Gera, East Germany (now Germany)
- Occupation: Film director
- Years active: 1989–present

Andreas Dresen (born 16 August 1963) is a German film director. His directing credits include Cloud 9, Summer in Berlin, Grill Point and Night Shapes. His film Stopped on Track premiered at the Un Certain Regard section at the 2011 Cannes Film Festival, where it won the Prize of Un Certain Regard. Dresen is known for his realistic style, which gives his films a semi-documentary feel. He works very team-oriented and heavily uses improvisation. In 2013 he was a member of the jury at the 63rd Berlin International Film Festival.

== Early life and education ==
Dresen was born in Gera. From 1984-85 Dresen worked as a sound engineer for the Schwerin Theatre. From 1984-1986 he was a trainee at East Germany's DEFA Studio for Feature Films as an assistant director to Günter Reisch. Between 1989-91 he studied directing at the Konrad Wolf College of Film and Television in Potsdam-Babelsberg and was a Master student in Günter Reisch's class at the Berlin Art Academy.

== Career ==
Starting in 1985, Dresen directed several short films, documentaries, and films for television, and wrote screenplays. His most successful film to date is Gundermann, a bio pic about the East German singer-songwriter Gerhard Gundermann, who died prematurely in 1998. It had taken Dresen twelve years to get funding for the film, which ended up focussing on Gundermann as a spy for the East German secret service instead of his spokesmanship for East German grievances both before and after 1989, his innovative concepts of theater and performance, or his staunchly leftist political ideas that included alternative visions of globalization and democracy.

== Filmography ==
- 1990: Shortcut to Istanbul (TV film) — (based on a story by Jurek Becker)
- 1992: Silent Country
- 1994: Mein unbekannter Ehemann (TV film)
- 1994: Das andere Leben des Herrn Kreins (TV film) — (based on the play The Professional by Dušan Kovačević)
- 1996: Polizeiruf 110: Der Tausch (TV series episode)
- 1997: Changing Skins (TV film)
- 1999: Nightshapes
- 2000: Policewoman (TV film) — (based on a novel by Annegret Held)
- 2002: Grill Point (Halbe Treppe)
- 2005: Willenbrock — (based on a novel by Christoph Hein)
- 2005: Summer in Berlin — (screenplay by Wolfgang Kohlhaase)
- 2008: Cloud 9
- 2009: Whiskey with Vodka — (screenplay by Wolfgang Kohlhaase)
- 2011: Stopped on Track
- 2015: As We Were Dreaming — (based on a novel by Clemens Meyer)
- 2017: Timm Thaler oder Das verkaufte Lachen — (based on the novel Timm Thaler by James Krüss)
- 2018: Gundermann
- 2022: Rabiye Kurnaz vs. George W. Bush
- 2024: From Hilde, With Love

Documentaries

- 1989: Jenseits von Klein Wanzleben
- 1994: Kuckuckskinder
- 2003: Denk ich an Deutschland … – Herr Wichmann von der CDU
- 2010: 20 x Brandenburg (TV)
- 2012: Henryk from the Back Row

== Awards ==
=== German Awards ===
- German Film Critics Association Awards

o 1999: Best feature film for Night Shapes
o 2003: Best feature film for Grill Point

- Bavarian Film Award

o 2003: Director's Award for Grill Point
o 2006: Director's Award for Summer in Berlin

- Hessian Film Award

o 1992: for Stilles Land

- Grimme-Award

o 2001: Adolf-Grimme-Award in Gold for Policewoman
o 2011: Grimme-Award, Section Information and Kultur, for the artistic direction of 20 x Brandenburg

- Fernsehfilm-Festival Baden-Baden

o 2000: Hauptpreis für Policewoman

- German Film Award

o 1999: Nominated for the Film Award in Gold for Extraordinary Achievements in Directing for Night Shapes
o 2002: Film Award in Silber for Grill Point
o 2002: Nominated for the Film Award for Extraordinary Achievements in Directing for Grill Point
o 2009: Best Director for Cloud 9

- German Television Award

o 2001: Award for best Director for Policewoman

- Internationales Filmfest Emden Aurich Norderney

o 1999: Nominated for the Film Award for Night Shapes

- 1992: German Film Critics Award

- 2007: Order of Merit of the Federal Republic of Germany

- 2011: Douglas-Sirk-Award of the Filmfest Hamburg

=== International Awards ===
- International Children's and Youth Filmfestival

o 1998: Lucas for the age group 12- and 13 for Changing Skins

- Max-Ophüls-Award

o 1995: Sponsorship Award for Feature Film for Mein unbekannter Ehemann

- International Filmfestival Berlin

o 1999: Nominated for the Golden Bear for Night Shapes
o 2002: Silver Bear of the jury for Grill Point

- Montréal Film Festival

o 2000: Nominated for the Grand Prix for Policewoman

- International Filmfestival Flandern

o 2002: Silver Spur for Grill Point

- Chicago International Film Festival

o 2002: Silver Hugo – Best Director for Grill Point

- European Film Award

o 2002: Nominated for Best Director for Grill Point
o 2008: Nominated for Best Director for Cloud 9

- International Film Festival of Cannes

o 2008: Coup de coeur du jury for Grill Point
o 2011: Prix Un Certain Regard for Stopped on Track

- International Filmfestival Karlovy Vary

o 2009: Best Director for Whiskey with Vodka
