= Jördis Triebel =

German actress

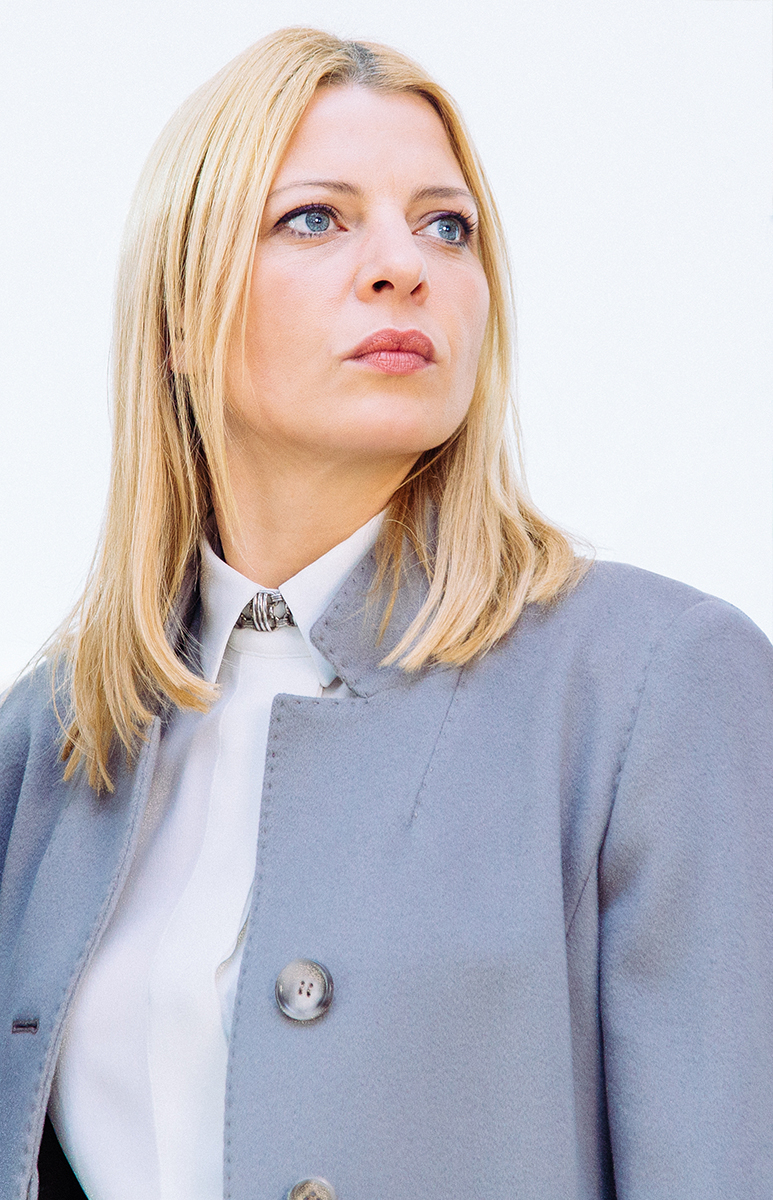
- Triebel in 2014
- Born: 30 October 1977 (age 48); East Berlin, East Germany
- Occupation: Actress
- Years active: 2002–present
- Spouse: Matthias Weidenhöfer (div. 2014)
- Children: 2

Jördis Triebel (born 30 October 1977) is a German film and stage actress.

== Early life ==
Triebel grew up the second oldest of four sisters in the Prenzlauer Berg locality of Berlin. She was exposed to the world of theatre early on through her mother, who before the fall of the Berlin Wall was a props mistress at the "Theater der Freundschaft" (English: Theater of Friendship, today known as the Theater an der Parkaue), and was sometimes able to sit in on rehearsals.

== Education ==
From 1997 to 2001, Triebel studied acting at the Ernst Busch Academy of Dramatic Arts.

== Career ==
=== Theatre ===
After she graduated, Triebel was an actress with the Bremer Theater. She belonged to the ensemble cast up until 2004. Whilst there Triebel among other things worked on the production of Henrik Ibsen's The Master Builder, Shakespeare's Romeo and Juliet, Hamlet and additionally Mark Ravenhill's Some Explicit Polaroids.

After cutting ties with the Bremer Theater in 2004, Triebel worked with the Schauspielhaus Zürich (English: the Zürich playhouse) during 2004 and 2005 for a short time, where she acted in Arthur Schnitzler's Das weite Land, a 1911 tragi-comedy about light-bulb producer Friedrich Hofreiter and his affair with his wife's banker's accountant, Adele. In 2006, she personified "Italy" in the Cologne playhouse's production of Europa für Anfanger (English: Europe for beginners).

=== Television and film ===
After a guest role in the TV series Wolffs Revier in 2005, Triebel gained her first major role in a film as the strongwoman/pig farmer Emma in Emma's Bliss. For this role, she received a nomination to the Deutscher Filmpreis (English: the German Film Awards). She was awarded a further nomination to the Deutscher Filmpreis for her performance as a supporting actress as the mother of the titular pope in Pope Joan. For the main role in West, Triebel was awarded best actress in the 2013 Montreal World Film Festival. Triebel received international attention for her portrayal of Katharina Nielsen in the 2017 Netflix series Dark. She subsequently performed in supporting roles in the Netflix series Babylon Berlin (2017) and The Empress (2022).

Triebel's film credits include A Good Summer, West, Lagerfeuer (English: Campfire) and Emma's Bliss. She has also had a re-occurring role in the television series KDD – Kriminaldauerdienst.

== Personal life ==
Triebel has two sons with German actor Matthias Weidenhöfer, from whom she separated in 2014.

== Filmography ==
- 2003: Lange Tage, Director: Antje Busse, Short film, Deutsche Film- und Fernsehakademie Berlin (dffb)
- 2005: Wolffs Revier: Herzblut, Director: Jürgen Heinrich, TV Series, SAT.1
- 2006: Emma's Bliss, Director: Sven Taddicken
- 2006: heteros nomos, Director: Kai Gero Lenke, Short film
- 2006: Speed Dating, Director: Gregor Buchkremer, Short film
- 2007–2010: KDD – Kriminaldauerdienst, TV Series, ZDF
- 2007: Suddenly Gina, Director: Maria von Heland, Straight-to-TV Movie, SAT.1
- 2007: Eine gute Mutter, Director: Matthias Glasner, Straight-to-TV Movie
- 2007: Der Kommissar und das Meer: Den du nicht siehst, Director: Anno Saul, TV Series, ZDF
- 2008: A Woman in Berlin, Director: Max Färberböck
- 2008: Das Duo, Director: Maris Pfeiffer, TV Series, ZDF
- 2008: Waiting for Angelina, Director: Hans-Christoph Blumenberg
- 2009: This Is Love, Director: Matthias Glasner
- 2009: Pope Joan, Director: Sönke Wortmann
- 2010: The Hairdresser, Director: Doris Dörrie
- 2010: Tatort: Am Ende des Tages, Director: Titus Selge, TV Series
- 2011: Familiengeheimnisse, Director: Carlo Rola, Straight-to-TV Movie, ZDF
- 2011: Freilaufende Männer, Director: Matthias Tiefenbacher, Straight-to-TV Movie, WDR
- 2011: A Good Summer, Director: Edward Berger, Straight-to-TV Movie, ARD
- 2012: Rosa Roth: Trauma, Director: Carlo Rola, TV Series, ZDF
- 2013: My Sisters, Director: Lars Kraume
- 2013: West, Director: Christian Schwochow
- 2013: Das Jerusalem-Syndrom, Director: Dror Zahavi, Straight-to-TV Movie, ARD
- 2013: The Almost Perfect Man, Director: Vanessa Jopp
- 2013: Wolf Children, Director: Rick Ostermann
- 2015: Me and Kaminski, Director: Wolfgang Becker
- 2015: Blochin – Die Lebenden und die Toten, Director: Matthias Glasner, TV Miniseries, ZDF
- 2015: Family Party, Director: Lars Kraume
- 2015: One Breath, Director: Christian Zübert
- 2016: The Verdict, Director: Lars Kraume, Straight-to-TV Movie, ARD
- 2017: Dark, TV Series
- 2017: Babylon Berlin, TV Series
- 2018: The Silent Revolution, Director: Lars Kraume
- 2022: The Empress as Princess Ludovika of Bavaria, mother of Helene and Elisabeth
- 2023: Someday We'll Tell Each Other Everything
- 2023: Blood & Gold
- 2023: Die drei ??? - Erbe des Drachen
- 2025: Köln 75
