= Clemens Meyer =

German writer (born 1977)

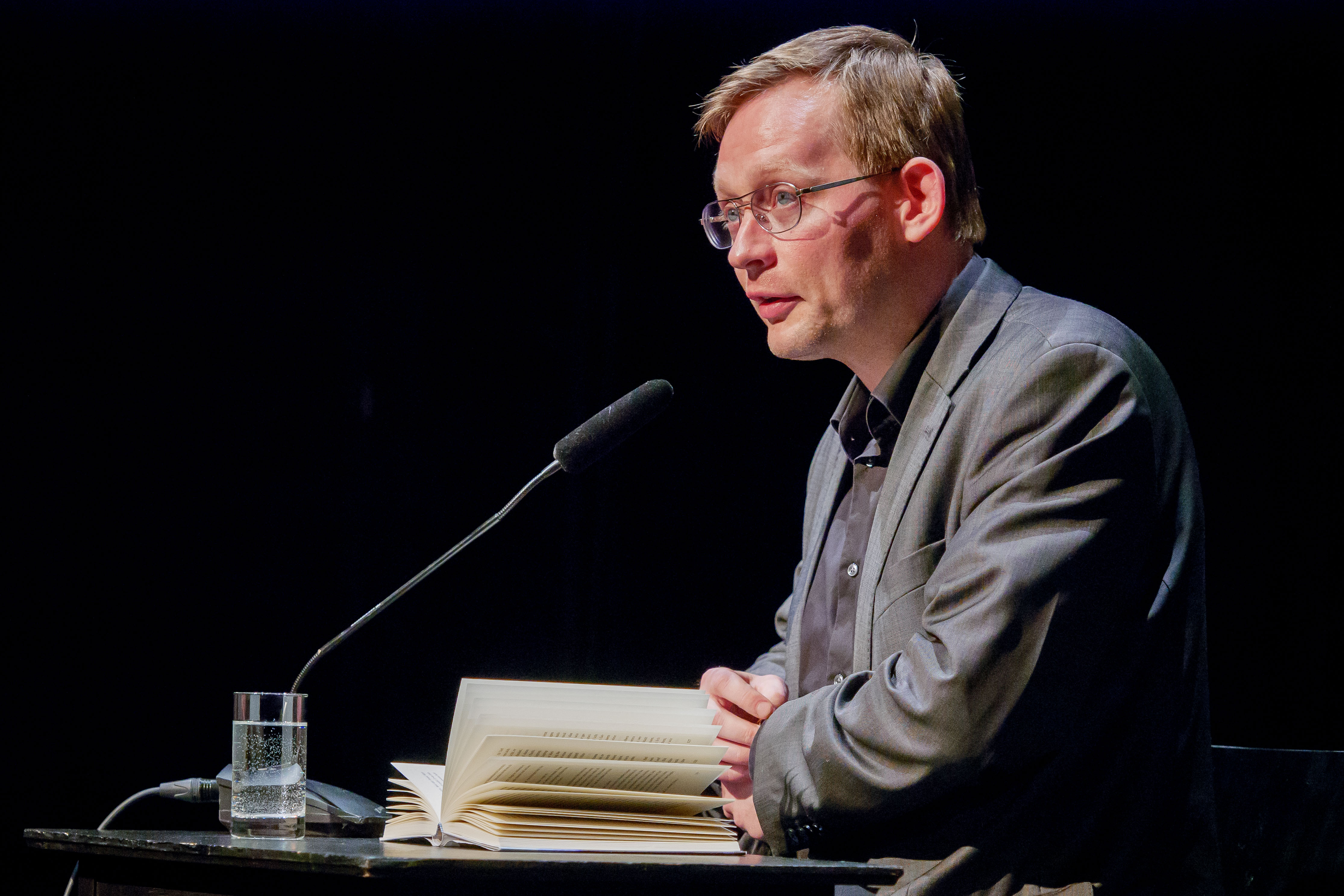
- Meyer at the Deutsch-Israelische Literaturtage in 2018.
- Born: 3 October 1977 (age 48); Halle an der Saale, Saxony-Anhalt, East Germany
- Occupations: Author, screenwriter
- Notable work: As We Were Dreaming; In the Aisles
- Website: www.meyer-clemens.de

Clemens Meyer (born 1977) is a German writer. He is the author of Als wir träumten (As We Were Dreaming, 2006), Die Nacht, die Lichter (All the Lights, 2008), Gewalten (Acts of Violence, 2010), Im Stein (Bricks and Mortar, 2013), and Die stillen Trabanten (Dark Satellites, 2017). Of Meyer's works, All the Lights, Bricks and Mortar, As We Were Dreaming, and Dark Satellites have been translated into English. Meyer lives in Leipzig.

== Early life ==
Meyer was born on 20 August 1977 in Halle an der Saale. His studies at the German Literature Institute, Leipzig, were interrupted by a spell in a youth detention centre. He worked as a security guard, forklift driver and construction worker before he became a published novelist.

== Work ==
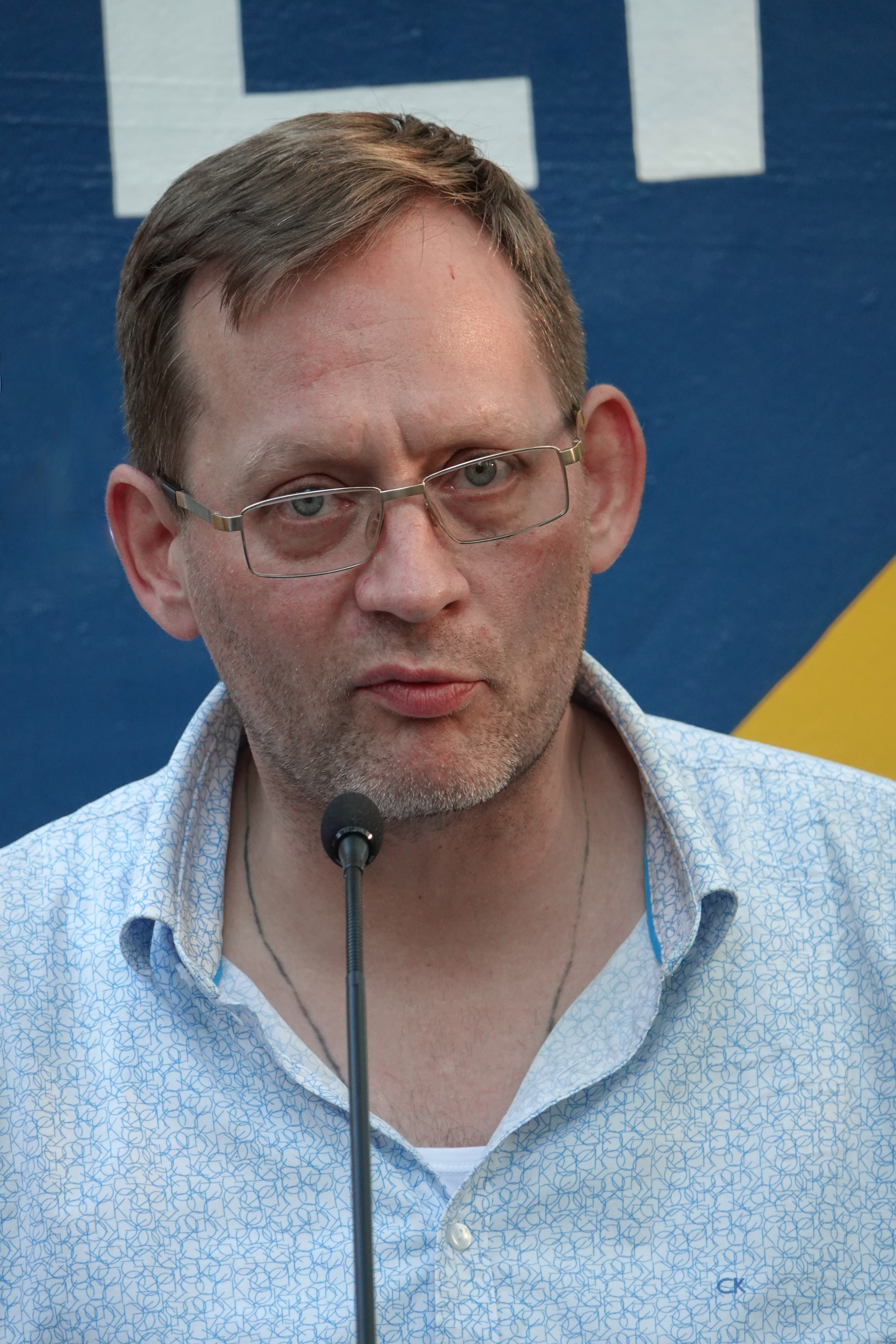
Clemens Meyer in 2024.

Meyer won a number of prizes for his first novel Als wir träumten (As We Were Dreaming), published in 2006, in which a group of friends grow up and go off the rails in East Germany after the fall of the Berlin Wall. He received the Rheingau Literatur Preis in 2006. It has been adapted into a film As We Were Dreaming, released in 2015.

His second book, Die Nacht, die Lichter (All the Lights, 2008), was translated by Katy Derbyshire and published by independent London publisher And Other Stories in 2011. It won the Leipzig Book Fair Prize in 2008. His third book, Gewalten (Acts of Violence), is a diary of 2009 in eleven stories.

Meyer published his second novel in 2013. Im Stein (Bricks and Mortar) was translated by Katy Derbyshire and included in the long list for the International Man Booker Prize in 2017. The novel won the prestigious Bremer Literaturpreis in 2014, and was shortlisted for the German Book Prize (Deutscher Buchpreis) in 2013. The English translation won the "Straelener Übersetzerpreis" of the Kunststiftung NRW in 2018 and was shortlisted for the 2019 Best Translated Book Award.

His third novel, Die Projektoren, was published in 2024. Meyer worked on the 1,040-page book for more than eight years. It was praised by the press and repeatedly described as an "epic" and Meyer's magnum opus. Die Projektoren was shortlisted for the German Book Prize. When he again failed to win, Meyer called the jury "bloody wankers" ("verdammte Wichser") and left the prizegiving ceremony, explaining later that he considered the decision "a shame for literature". Meyer also stated that he had financial debts and needed the prize money to pay them off. At the end of the year, Meyer won the Bavarian Book Prize for Die Projektoren.

== Awards ==
- Winner of the Rheingau Literatur Preis 2006
- Winner of the Leipzig Book Fair Prize 2008
- Winner of the Literaturpreis der Stadt Bremen 2014
- Winner of the German Screenplay Award 2015 for In the Aisles
- Winner of the Bavarian Book Prize 2024 for Die Projektoren
- Winner of the Lessing Prize of the Free State of Saxony 2025

== Bibliography ==
Novels

- Als wir träumten (2006). S. Fischer Verlag, Frankfurt am Main.
  - translated by Katy Derbyshire, While We Were Dreaming, London: Fitzcarraldo Editions, 2023. ISBN 978-1-8042-7028-8
- Im Stein (2013). S. Fischer Verlag, Frankfurt am Main.
  - trans. Katy Derbyshire, Bricks and Mortar, London: Fitzcarraldo Editions, 2016
- Die Projektoren (2024). S. Fischer Verlag, Frankfurt am Main. ISBN 978-3-10-002246-2

Short stories and collected writings

- Die Nacht, die Lichter (2008). S. Fischer Verlag, Frankfurt am Main.
  - trans. Katy Derbyshire, All the Lights, London: And Other Stories, 2011. ISBN 978-1-908276-01-8
- Gewalten. Ein Tagebuch (2010). S. Fischer Verlag, Frankfurt am Main.
- Der Untergang der Äkschn GmbH: Frankfurter Poetikvorlesungen (2016). S. Fischer Verlag, Frankfurt am Main.
- Die stillen Trabanten (2017). S. Fischer Verlag, Frankfurt am Main.
  - trans. Katy Derbyshire, Dark Satellites, London: Fitzcarraldo Editions, 2020.
- Stäube (2023). S. Fischer Verlag, Frankfurt am Main.

Other publications

- Zwei Himmelhunde: Irre Filme, die man besser liest (Movies that you better read, with Claudius Nießen, 2016)

Translation

- Amy Hempel, Jim Shepard: Dir zu Füßen: Gedichte von Hunden (German translation, 2010)
- Art Spiegelman, Robert Coover: Street Cop (German translation, 2023)

== Filmography ==
Screenplays

- Herbert (directed and co-written by Thomas Stuber, 2015)
- Der Dicke liebt (short film, directed and co-written by Alexander Khuon, 2016)
- In the Aisles (directed and co-written by Thomas Stuber, 2018)
- Tatort: Angriff auf Wache 08 (TV film, directed and co-written by Thomas Stuber, 2019)
- Polizeiruf 110: An der Saale hellem Strande (TV film, directed and co-written by Thomas Stuber, 2021)
- Die stillen Trabanten (directed and co-written by Thomas Stuber, 2022)
- Polizeiruf 110: Der Dicke liebt (TV film, directed and co-written by Thomas Stuber, 2024)

Acting roles

- Als wir träumten (2015)
- Herbert (2015)
- In the Aisles (2018)
- Tatort: Angriff auf Wache 08 (2019)
- Polizeiruf 110: An der Saale hellem Strande (2021)
