= Kafka (TV series) =

- Genre: Historical drama
- Written by: Daniel Kehlmann; David Schalko
- Directed by: David Schalko
- Starring: Joel Basman; David Kross
- Narrated by: Michael Maertens
- Composer: Kyrre Kvam
- Countries of origin: Austria; Germany
- No. of seasons: 1
- No. of episodes: 6

Production
- Executive producer: John Lueftner
- Producers: Florian Engelhardt; David Schalko
- Production location: Austria
- Cinematography: Martin Gschlacht
- Running time: 51–61 minutes
- Production company: Superfilm

Original release
- Network: ARD
- Release: 24 March – 25 March 2024

Kafka is a 2024 Austrian and German television series which centers on the life of Franz Kafka, who had a troubled personal life, including a difficult relationship with his tyrannical father and love affairs with Felice Bauer, Milena Jesenská, and Dora Diamant, which influenced his writing. The six-part miniseries was presented in the program of the Berlinale Series Market in February 2024 as part of the 74th Berlin International Film Festival.

== Plot ==
In addition to Kafka's difficult relationship with his tyrannical father, the series deals with his love affairs with Felice Bauer, Milena Jesenská and Dora Diamant and his friendship with Max Brod. The screenplay is based on the three-volume biography of Kafka by Reiner Stach.

== Production and background ==
Filming took place from February 28 to June 19, 2023 in Vienna, Salzburg and Lower Austria, including the Strasshof Railway Museum.

The series was produced by the Austrian Production Company Superfilm (producers David Schalko and John Lueftner), with the Austrian Broadcasting Corporation and the ARD broadcasters (NDR, WDR, SWR, BR, MDR, rbb, hr, SR and Radio Bremen) involved. The production was supported by FISA+, Fernsehfonds Austria and Filmfonds Wien.

Joel Basman was cast in the title role of Franz Kafka, with David Kross as Max Brod (Daniel Brühl was originally announced for this role), Nicholas Ofczarek as Hermann Kafka and Liv Lisa Fries as Milena Jesenská. Reiner Stach, on whose three-volume biography of Kafka the screenplay is based, acted as technical advisor. A recurring plot element is Horace Fletcher's chewing method, which Kafka advocated, according to which food must be chewed thoroughly before swallowing.

Martin Gschlacht worked as cinematographer, the costume design by Alfred Mayerhofer, the set design by Hannes Salat, the sound by Odo Grötschnig and the make-up by Cordula Lingler and Christine Akbaba. Katharina Haudum acted as intimacy coordinator.

== Publication ==
The film biography was presented in February 2024 as part of the Berlinale 2024 in the Berlinale Series Market program.

The ORF premiere was on March 24. and 25. 2024 with three episodes each. Since March 20, 2024, all six episodes have been available via the ARD Mediathek. The first broadcast on the channel Das Erste with three episodes each took place on March 26 and 27, 2024 on the occasion of the 100th anniversary of Kafka's death on June 3. The series is scheduled to be released on DVD on June 28, 2024.

The series has been licensed to the Czech Republic, Slovakia, Slovenia, Finland, Sweden, the UK, Mexico and Switzerland, among others.

In March 2024, the film adaptation of the novel The Glory of Life about the last year of Kafka's life was also released in German cinemas.

== Cast ==
- Joel Basman as Franz Kafka
- David Kross as Max Brod
- Nicholas Ofczarek as Hermann Kafka
- Liv Lisa Fries as Milena Jesenská
- Lia von Blarer as Felice Bauer
- Tamara Romera Ginés as Dora Dymant
- Robert Stadlober as Felix Weltsch
- Verena Altenberger as Robert Musil
- Judith Altenberger as Erna Bauer
- Lars Eidinger as Rainer Maria Rilke
- Konstantin Frank as Jizchak Löwy
- Christian Friedel as Franz Werfel
- Charly Hübner as Ernst Rowohlt
- Anne Bennent as Anna Bauer
- Laurence Rupp as Kurt Wolff
- Marie-Lou Sellem as Julie Kafka
- Johannes Silberschneider as Robert Marschner
- Marie-Luise Stockinger as Grete Bloch
- Mariam Avaliani as Elli Kafka
- Naemi Latzer as Valli Kafka
- Maresi Riegner as Ottla Kafka
- Daniel Kehlmann as Arthur Schnitzler
