= Camill Hoffmann =

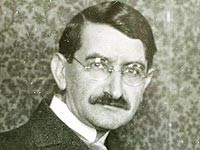
Image of Camill Hoffmann

Camill Hoffmann (1878-1944) was a Czechoslovak Jewish diplomat and writer born in 1878. He was murdered in the Holocaust.

An ardent Czechoslovak nationalist, Hoffmann was appointed to the diplomatic corps as a cultural attaché in Berlin. As the rising Nazi Party became increasingly belligerent, Hoffmann began using his political clout and connections to help German Jews, including Leon Trotsky's son, who he aided in escaping Berlin.

During 1939 he was mobilized on behalf of Max Brod, Franz Kafka's friend and literary executor. Hoffmann was asked to try to rescue Kafka's writings and personal correspondence confiscated by the Gestapo from Kafka's mistress, Dora Diamant. He was unsuccessful, however, and the materials remain lost, pursued still by the Kafka Project at San Diego State University.

His diary from his time as a diplomat, "Politicky Denik", translated as "The Political Diaries of Camill Hoffmann from 1932 to 1939," was recently published in Czech.

Hoffmann was murdered in the Auschwitz concentration camp in 1944.
