= The Glory of Life =

The Glory of Life may refer to:

- The Glow of Life, also known as The Glory of Life, a 1919 Japanese film
- The Glory of Life (2024 film), a 2024 German-Austrian drama film
