= Beloved Sisters =

2014 film

- Film poster
- Directed by: Dominik Graf
- Written by: Dominik Graf
- Produced by: Uschi Reich
- Starring: Hannah Herzsprung; Florian Stetter; Henriette Confurius; Claudia Messner; Ronald Zehrfeld; Maja Maranow; Michael Wittenborn
- Cinematography: Michael Wiesweg
- Edited by: Claudia Wolscht
- Music by: Sven Rossenbach; Florian van Volxem
- Release dates: 8 February 2014 (Berlin); 31 July 2014 (Germany)
- Running time: 138 minutes
- Country: Germany
- Language: German

Beloved Sisters (German: Die geliebten Schwestern) is a 2014 German biographical film written and directed by Dominik Graf. The film is based on the life of the German poet Friedrich Schiller (1759–1805) and upon his long relationships with two sisters, Caroline and Charlotte von Lengefeld. Schiller was ultimately married to Charlotte von Lengefeld.

The film was nominated for the Golden Bear Award at the 64th Berlin International Film Festival, and had its premiere at the festival. It was selected as the German entry for the Best Foreign Language Film at the 87th Academy Awards, but was not nominated.

== Cast ==
- Henriette Confurius as Charlotte von Lengefeld
- Florian Stetter as Friedrich Schiller
- Hannah Herzsprung as Caroline von Beulwitz
- Claudia Messner as Madame Lengefeld
- Ronald Zehrfeld as Wolzogen
- Andreas Pietschmann as Friedrich von Beulwitz
- Maja Maranow as Frau von Stein
- Peter Schneider as Christian Gottfried Körner
- Anne Schäfer as Charlotte von Kalb
- Michael Wittenborn as Knebel
- Thomas Kornack as Kutscher in Weimar
- Christine Zart as Housekeeper Stein

== Reception ==
On review aggregator website Rotten Tomatoes, the film holds an approval rating of 71% based on 42 reviews, with an average rating of 6.7/10.

== See also ==
- List of submissions to the 87th Academy Awards for Best Foreign Language Film
- List of German submissions for the Academy Award for Best Foreign Language Film
