= Ludwig II (2012 film) =

- Theatrical release poster
- Directed by: Peter Sehr; Marie Noëlle
- Screenplay by: Peter Sehr; Marie Noëlle
- Produced by: Ronald Mühlfellner
- Starring: Sabin Tambrea; Sebastian Schipper; Hannah Herzsprung; Edgar Selge
- Cinematography: Christian Berger
- Edited by: Hans Funck
- Music by: Bruno Coulais
- Production companies: Bavaria Pictures; Dor Film; Warner Bros. Film Productions Germany
- Distributed by: Warner Bros. Pictures
- Release date: 26 December 2012
- Running time: 130 minutes
- Country: Germany
- Language: German
- Budget: €16,000,000 (estimated)

Ludwig II is a 2012 German-Austrian historical film directed by Peter Sehr and Marie Noëlle, starring Sabin Tambrea as the younger Bavarian King Ludwig II and Sebastian Schipper as the king in his later years.

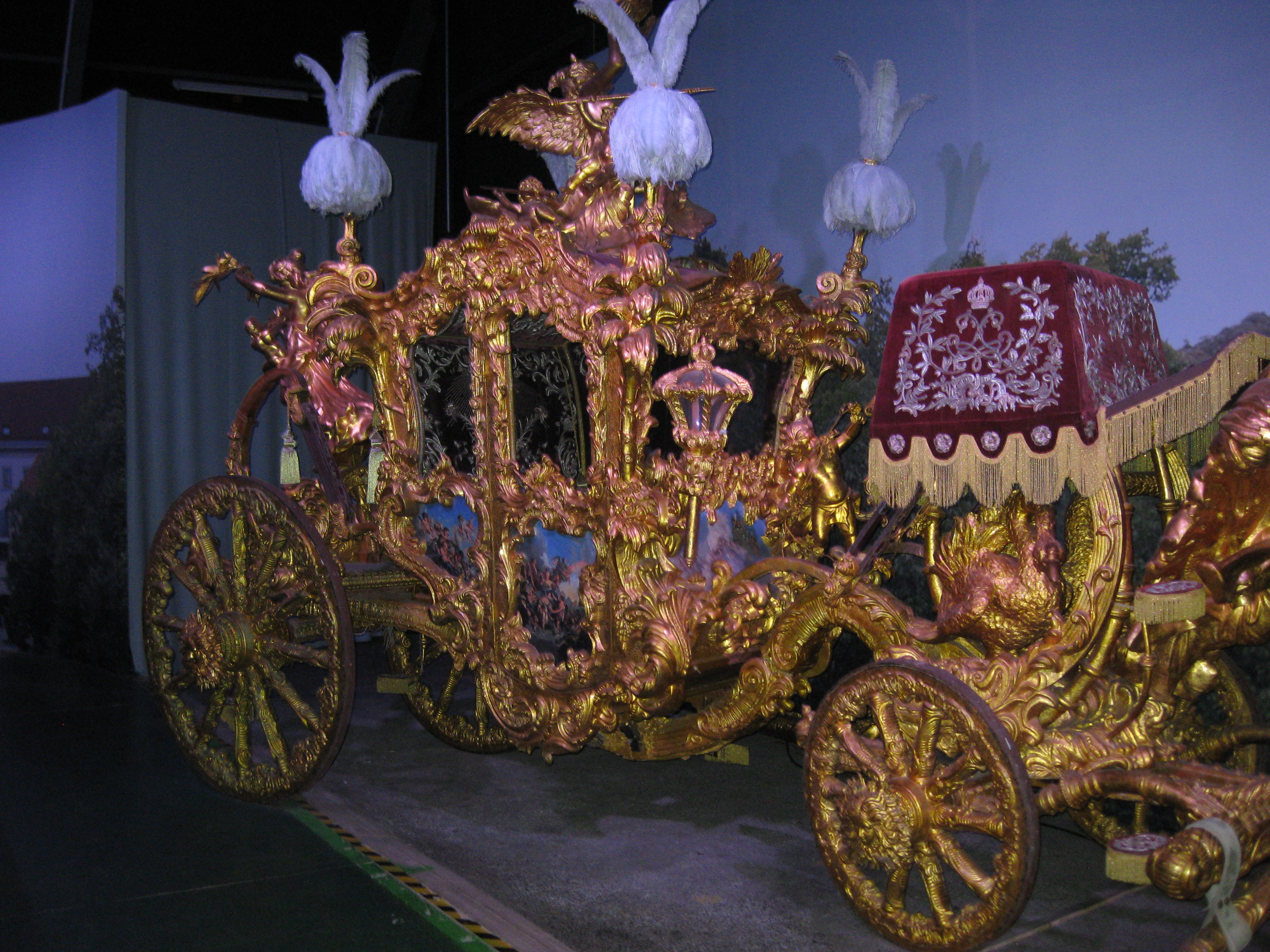
The carriage used by Ludwig in the film

== Plot ==
Crown Prince Ludwig suffers under the authoritarian education of his father King Maximilian II and has no interest in his militaristic attitude. In addition, because of his love for music and the fine arts, Ludwig repeatedly incurs the displeasure of his father. For Ludwig, art is more important than daily bread.

Maximilian II dies unexpectedly of erysipelas, so Ludwig, full of idealism, ascends the Bavarian throne at the age of 18. At a time when war and poverty are omnipresent, he believes in a better world and wants to use his power to ensure that his people can live in peace and happiness. He wants his kingdom to become a place where beauty, art and culture will flourish; instead of weapons, Ludwig wants to invest public money in theatre, music and education.

He spends his free time with his young cousin, Sophie, the sister of the Austrian Empress Sissi. With her he can philosophise about music and the beauty of the world. Moreover, he has all of his rooms in the castle remodelled and designed according to his ideas.

He loves Richard Wagner's operas, and his passion and admiration for the controversial composer's works and their legends are so great that he wants to bring Wagner to his court. To achieve this, he instructs the well-known music lover Johann von Lutz to track down Wagner and bring him to his court. He awaits the arrival of his idol impatiently and receives him with great respect. He settles Wagner's debts and obtains a pardon for the revolutionary and politically persecuted composer. However, his ministers rebel against his expensive sponsorship of the composer.

At first, Ludwig throws himself into political business with enthusiasm. He initiates a school reform and distributes musical instruments instead of weapons to his young cadets. He is of the opinion that if Bavaria should ever be attacked, the sound of Wagner's music will immediately disarm them. Even a conversation with his cousin, Elisabeth of Austria, who wants to ask for help in preventing Prussia from waging war against Austria, fails because of his naive belief that music alone is capable of keeping people's hearts peaceful.

Ludwig's ministers are not satisfied with the power that Wagner's ideas seem to have over the young king. Ludwig increasingly neglects the affairs of government. The news of an impending war reaches him while he is on the road with Wagner in the Bavarian mountains. The composer suggests that he replace the ministers who now want to go to war. They in turn threaten to resign from their positions if Ludwig does not part with Wagner and his influence. Since the king fears for his friend's life, he urges him to leave Bavaria. He realises that circumstances are against him, and his beloved kingdom gets involved in the war with Prussia against his will. Disheartened, and showing first signs of delusional illnesses, Ludwig withdraws from public life.

The news of the defeat of his army hits him hard, since he has spent the money that was intended for modern rifles on musical instruments. His stable master, Richard Hornig, is at his side and is willing to support him, but Ludwig does not want to admit his affection for men. In order to deal with the war defeat, he travels his country and shows himself to his people. Moreover, he plans his wedding with Sophie because he is convinced that the people expect this from him. As part of the wedding preparations, Wagner arrives at court again to take over the musical design. As a result, Ludwig meets a young singer, Heinrich Vogel, whom he wants to hear singing as Lohengrin, which incurs Wagner's displeasure.

Sophie demands proof of love in the form of a kiss from her future husband. This leads to a scandal, and Ludwig cancels his already planned and longed-for wedding because he realises that, due to his homosexuality, which he does not confess to her or to others, he cannot have more than friendship with his fiancée. In a letter, he asks Sophie's forgiveness and understanding. In his opinion, she has the right to be happy, which would not be possible at his side in the long run.

In addition to those private problems, political events are catching up with him again. Bavaria's defeat by Prussia forces the country to enter the 1870-71 war against France as a compulsory ally of Otto von Bismarck. Bismarck's efforts to create an all-German empire, headed by an emperor, destroys the dream of a sovereign Bavarian kingdom continuing to exist. Ludwig's brother Otto suffers a nervous breakdown and has to be taken to a sanatorium. The attending physician assumes that Otto will not recover from his mental derangement. Ludwig promises to build his brother a castle where he can be who he is, just as he also longs himself to have a place where he can be who he is. With this in mind, he has Neuschwanstein Castle built.

Nevertheless, Ludwig does not achieve peace: the abysses of his soul are too deep, tormenting him and making him despair. Disillusioned, he retires again from public life and takes refuge in the world of opera melodies. He does not want to admit the financial problems that the state budget has to suffer due to his excessive construction activities. But reality catches up with him, and Ludwig's opponents team up to depose him and the castles in his dream realm of fantasy. Even his long-standing devotee Johann von Lutz, whom he had made minister, comes to doubt Ludwig's common sense. After a fire breaks out in the castle, Richard Hornig is seriously injured. The sadness of never being allowed to stand by his love for the stable master drives him even further into madness, which his opponents are now increasingly aware of. One of his ministers has a medical report drawn up in order to justify deposing the king.

Ludwig senses the plan and intends to blow himself up with his castles before he can be chased away from them, but the project fails due to the inappropriate explosives. Following that, the minister succeeds in taking the king into medical care against his will in Castle Berg.

Desperate about the disregard for his royal privileges, and his treatment as a "poor lunatic", he decided to escape his treatment. While taking a walk with his doctor, he escapes him and runs into Lake Starnberg, where he drowns.

== Cast ==
- Sabin Tambrea as King Ludwig II (young)
- Sebastian Schipper as King Ludwig II
- Hannah Herzsprung as Empress Elisabeth of Austria
- Edgar Selge as Richard Wagner
- Tom Schilling as Prince Otto
- Justus von Dohnányi as Johann von Lutz
- Friedrich Mücke as Richard Hornig
- Samuel Finzi as Lorenz Mayr
- Christophe Malavoy as Napoleon III
- Axel Milberg as King Maximilian II
- Katharina Thalbach as Queen Marie
- Uwe Ochsenknecht as Prince Luitpold
- Paula Beer as Duchess Sophie in Bavaria
- August Wittgenstein as Alfred Eckbrecht von Dürckheim-Montmartin

== Historical inaccuracies ==
- The death of King Maximilian II, Ludwig's father, in the film is shown as if it were extremely sudden. Actually, the sickness which led to his death lasted for many weeks, during which Ludwig was criticized for the audiences he granted to the tenor Albert Niemann, a behaviour considered disrespectful towards his sick father.
- The meeting between Ludwig and Richard Hornig where Hornig himself finds Wagner, which in the film takes place in March 1864, happened instead in May 1867
- In the film the famous official portrait of Ludwig is painted in 1867 while in reality it was already painted in 1865.
- In the film Richard Wagner is found by Hornig while in reality he was found by the king's minister Pfistermeister. Indeed, it was to him that Ludwig gave the photograph with the ruby to give to the composer, and not to Lutz as seen in the film.
- Ludwig decides to curl his hair for the arrival of Wagner, but this decision was actually made when he was still crown prince to hide his protruding ears, a physical defect that he could not bear.
- In the film Ludwig signs the famous Kaiserbrief in the Residenz, while it happened in Hohenschwangau, which is neither shown nor mentioned, although it was a castle very dear to Ludwig.
