= Port Erin Women's Detention Camp =

WWII internment camp, Isle of Man, UK

Port Erin Women's Detention Camp was a World War II internment camp on the Isle of Man at Port Erin. It was Europe's only all-female internment camp. Notable internees included Dora Diamant, the lover of Franz Kafka in the last year of his life, and Fay Taylour, champion motorcycle, speedway and racing car driver.

== Other camps ==
Other WWII internment camps at on the Isle of Man included the Hutchinson Internment Camp in Douglas, noted as "the artists' camp”, the Metropole Internment Camp also in Douglas, predominantly for Italians, Sefton Internment Camp on the promenade in Douglas, the Peel Internment Camp, and Mooragh Internment Camp in Ramsey. Rushen Camp was later established for couples, but run by civilian owners who remained in the camp, instead of the military.

=== Notable internees ===
- Hedy Bienenfeld (1907–1976), Austrian-American Olympic swimmer
