= Charlotte von Lengefeld =

Wife of German poet Friedrich Schiller

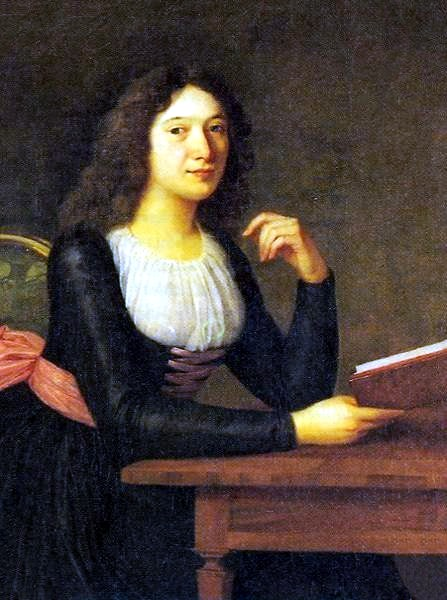
- Portrait by Ludovike Simanowiz, 1794
- Born: November 22, 1766; Rudolstadt
- Died: July 9, 1826 (aged 59)
- Occupations: author; translator

Charlotte Luise Antoinette von Schiller (née von Lengefeld; 22 November 1766 – 9 July 1826) was the wife of German poet Friedrich Schiller and was herself an author and translator.

== Early life ==
Lengefeld was born in Rudolstadt, Schwarzburg-Rudolstadt, into an aristocratic family, and given an education appropriate to a life at the ducal court of Weimar. Her father Carl Christoph von Lengefeld (1715–1775), who died when she was a young girl, had been a forest administrator (Oberlandjägermeister, Master of the Hunt) of Louis Günther II, Prince of Schwarzburg-Rudolstadt, while her mother was Louise von Lengefeld, nee Wurmb (1743–1823). In her young adulthood she was introduced to the literary circles of Weimar. She became friendly with Charlotte von Stein, who was at the center of the circle of Weimar Classicism as a friend of Schiller and sometime mistress of Johann Wolfgang von Goethe. Stein confided in her throughout her complex relationship with Goethe.

Her first love was a soldier, but after her family's opposition the engagement was dropped.

== Marriage to Schiller ==
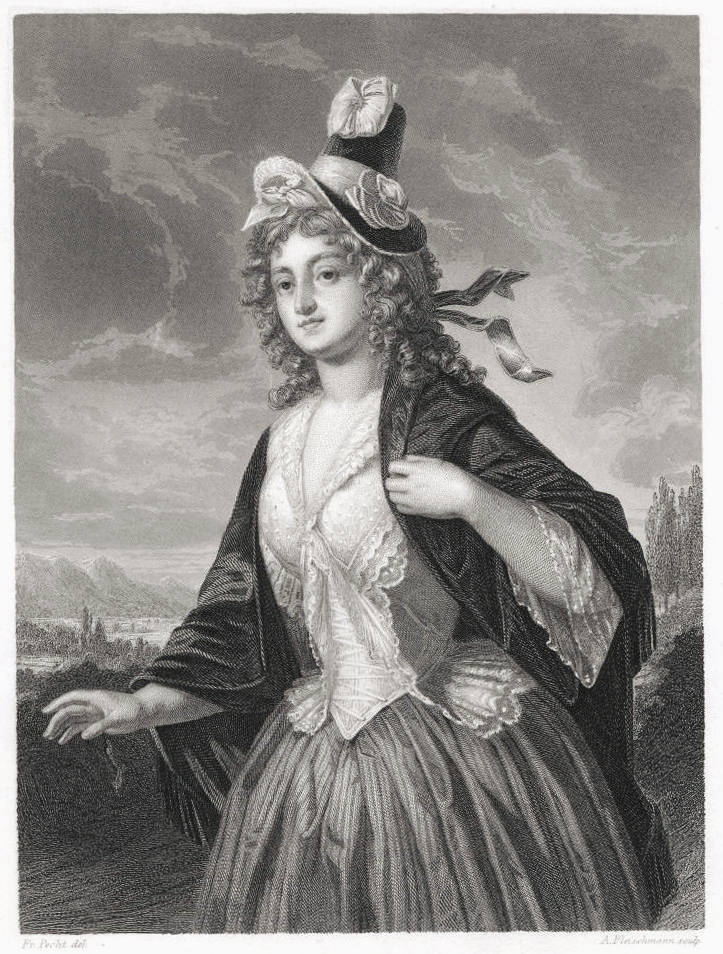
Print of a portrait of Charlotte von Lengefeld, probably by Auguste Christian Fleischman.

Lengefeld first met Schiller, then a little-known and impoverished poet, in 1785, through her older sister Caroline and her cousin Wilhelm von Wolzogen, who later became Caroline's second husband. They began a correspondence in 1788, and, aided by the Lengefelds, Schiller took up residence near Rudolstadt shortly thereafter. He seems to have made his affections clear to her that year, though they were confirmed to each by Caroline the following summer; Schiller wrote to Charlotte in August, 1789: "Am I to hope that Caroline read in your soul and answered from your heart what I did not dare to confess? Oh how hard it has been for me to keep this secret which I was obliged to do from the beginning of our acquaintance."

The precise nature of Schiller's relationship to the two sisters has been disputed. In Caroline's later novel Agnes von Lilien, two women both pursue a relationship with a young baron, and critics have debated whether to understand the novel's love triangle as a reflection of Caroline, Charlotte, and Schiller (more recent critics are less inclined to do so). The letters later published from Schiller's correspondence with Charlotte are both deeply affectionate and literate; according to Edward Bulwer-Lytton, Lengefeld's admiration for Schiller's early work, particularly "The Artists," was important to their courtship. They married on 22 February 1790 in the small church of Wenigenjena (now named Schillerkirche) in Jena.

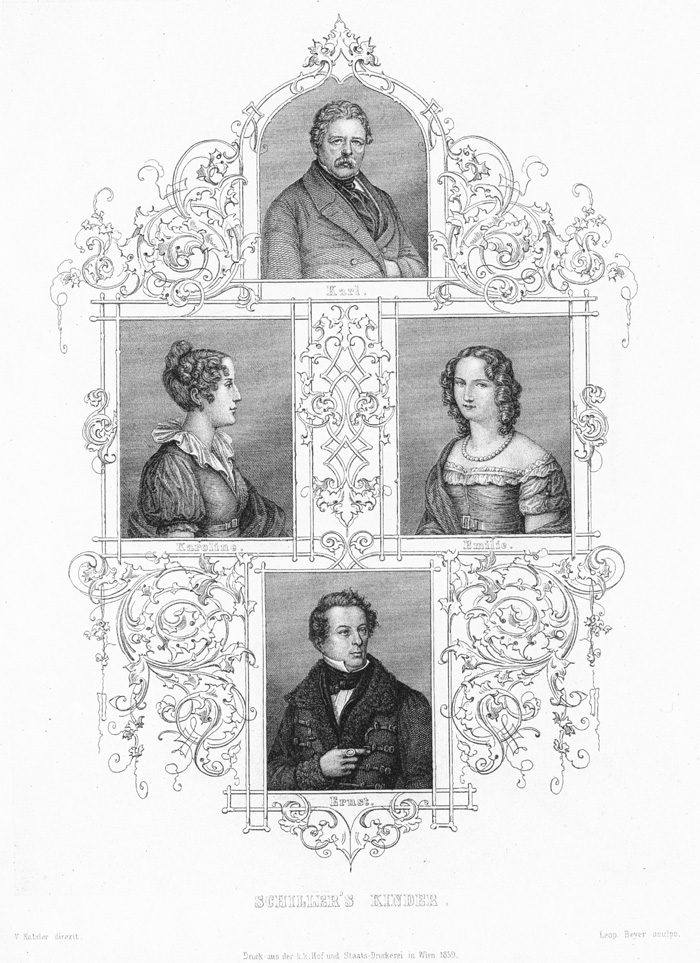
The Schillers' four children

The Schillers had four children:

- Karl Ludwig Friedrich (1793–1857),
- Ernst Friedrich Wilhelm (1796–1841),
- Karoline Luise Friederike Schiller (1799–1850), and
- Emilie Henriette Luise (1804–1872).

== Works ==
Though never a published author during her lifetime, Lengefeld was a writer her entire life. Her letters to her husband, her sister, Stein, Goethe, and others have been published in multiple editions. She has also been identified as the author of several works found among her husband's papers and posthumously included in collected editions alongside his work, notably the novel Die heimliche Heirat (The Secret Marriage). She was a gifted translator and embarked (probably in 1802) on a transaltion of Racine's "Britannicus" (shortly to be edited by Pailer and Nebrig). Along with other women in the Goethe-Schiller circle, Lengefeld has been receiving increased critical attention; critic Gaby Pailer wrote the first full-length scholarly book on her life and work, published in 2009.

== See also ==
- Beloved Sisters [Die geliebten Schwestern]. A 2014 German biographical film.
