= Joel Basman =

Swiss-Israeli actor (born 1990)

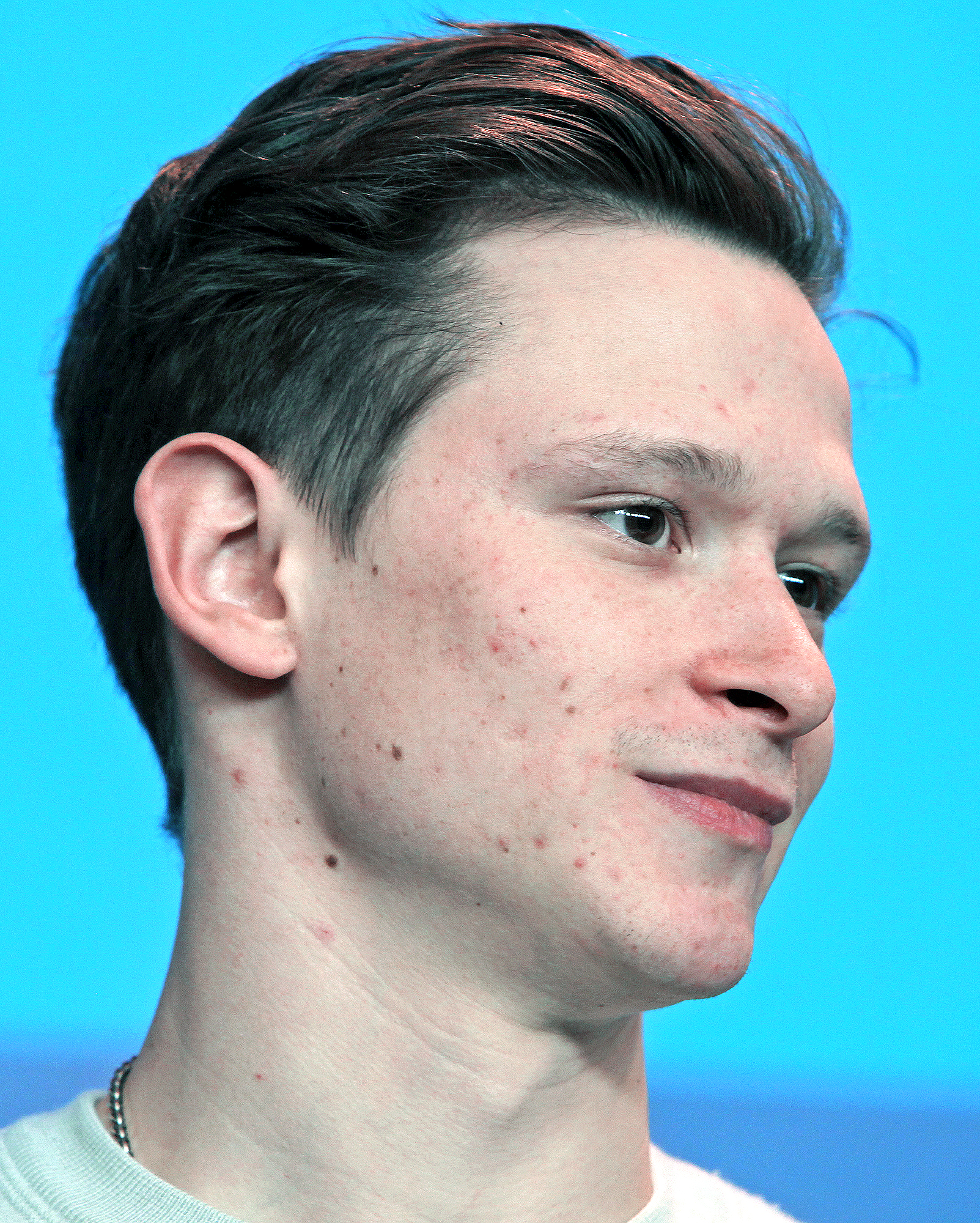
- Joel Basman at the 65th Berlinale in February 2015
- Born: 23 January 1990 (age 36); Zurich, Switzerland
- Occupation: Actor
- Years active: 2004–present

Joel Basman (born 23 January 1990) is a Swiss-Israeli actor best known for having played Franz Kafka in the ARD Miniseries Kafka (2024).

== Early life ==
Basman was born in Zurich, Switzerland, to a Swiss Christian mother and an Israeli-Jewish father, both of whom were tailors in the Swiss fashion industry. He grew up in the neighborhood of Aussersihl and was raised bilingual, speaking Swiss-German and Hebrew. He has one older sister who resides in Israel.

== Career ==
In 2004, he started his career and played a bold teenager named Zizou for the weekly soap opera Lüthi und Blanc.

In 2007, director Tobias Ineichen gave the main part to Basman for his film Jimmie. There, he played an autistic boy. In February 2008, he got the prize Shooting Star for his part as a Russian teenager on the film Luftibus, written by director Dominque de Rivaz. In September 2008, Basman received the Schweizer Fernsehpreis (Swiss TV-Prize) in the category film. In October 2008, he got the prize for the best main part from Cinema Tous Ecrans.

At the Schauspielhaus Zürich, Joel Basman acted in 2003 for a youth-theatre project. In 2004 and 2005, he played with students, who were at their final project. He finished his studies at the European Film Actor School in October 2008.

In 2012, Basman got a part as Bertel in the three-part TV film Unsere Mütter, unsere Väter (Our mothers, our fathers). He also played Pascal in the Swiss TV-film Ziellos (Aimless).

Joel Basman starred as Sebastien Leclercq in a game called Late Shift in 2016.

In 2018, Basman played the lead role in The Awakening of Motti Wolkenbruch, which was picked up by Netflix.

== Filmography ==
Year	Film	Name	Director
2004–2006	Lüthi und Blanc	Zizou Imboden	Sabine Boss and others
2004	Mein Name ist Eugen		Michael Steiner
2005	Ausgrenzungen		Liliane Steiner
2006	Breakout	Silenzio	Mike Eschmann
2006	Cannabis – Probieren geht über Regieren	Remo	Niklaus Hilber
2007	Mikado		Silvia Zeitlinger
2007	Tausend Ozeane	Eric	Luki Frieden
2007	Jimmie	Jimmie	Tobias Ineichen
2007	Luftbusiness	Liocha	Dominique de Rivaz
2008	Happy New Year	Oskar	Christoph Schaub
2008	Tatort: Liebeswirren	Werner Weißenbach	Tobias Ineichen
2008	Mein Schüler, seine Mutter & ich	Franz	Andreas Linke
2010	Picco	Tommy	Philip Koch
2010	Sennentuntschi	Albert	Michael Steiner
2010	Tatort: Der letzte Patient	Tim König	Friedemann Fromm
2010	Rosannas Tochter	Ruben	
2011	Löwenzahn – Das Kinoabenteuer	Ronny	Peter Timm
2011	Hanna	Razor	Joe Wright
2012	Polizeiruf 110: Eine andere Welt	Dennis Kuscinsky	Nicolai Rohde
2013	Unsere Mütter, unsere Väter	Bartel	Philipp Kadelbach
2013	Tatort: Freunde bis in den Tod	Manu	Nicolai Rohde
2013	Summer Outside	Theo	Friederike Jehn
2013	Puppylove	Paul	Delphine Lehericey
2013	Keep Rollin'	Paul	Stefan Hillebrand, Oliver Paulus
2014	Dawn	Elisha	Romed Wyder
2014	The Monuments Men	German soldier	George Clooney
2014	Ziellos	Pascal	Niklaus Hilber
2014	Wir Sind Jung. Wir Sind Stark	Robbie	Burhan Qurbani
2015	Tatort: Borowski und der Himmel über Kiel	Mike Nickel	Christian Schwochow
2015	Land of Mine	Helmut Morbach	Martin Zandvliet
2017	Papillon	Maturette	Aaron Guzikowski
2018	Kursk	Leo	Thomas Vinterberg
2018	Wolkenbruch's Wondrous Journey Into the Arms of a Shiksa	Mordechai Wolkenbruch	Michael Steiner
2018	Zauberer	Marcel	Sebastian Brauneis
2019	A Hidden Life	Military trainee	Terrence Malick
2020	Adventures of a Mathematician	Edward Teller	Thor Klein
2021	The King's Man	Gavrilo Princip	Matthew Vaughn
2021	Tides	Paling	Tim Fehlbaum
2023	Kafka	Franz Kafka	David Schalko
2023	Stella. A Life.	Peter	Kilian Riedhof
2026	The Girl with the Leica		Alina Marazzi
TBA	Storm	Walter Storm	Ivan Madeo

== Audio drama ==
- 2013: Hattie Naylor: Ivan und die Hunde; Regie: Reto Ott (SRF)

== Distinctions ==
- 2008: Schweizer Fernsehpreis
- 2008: Shooting Star
