= Sabin Tambrea =

German actor

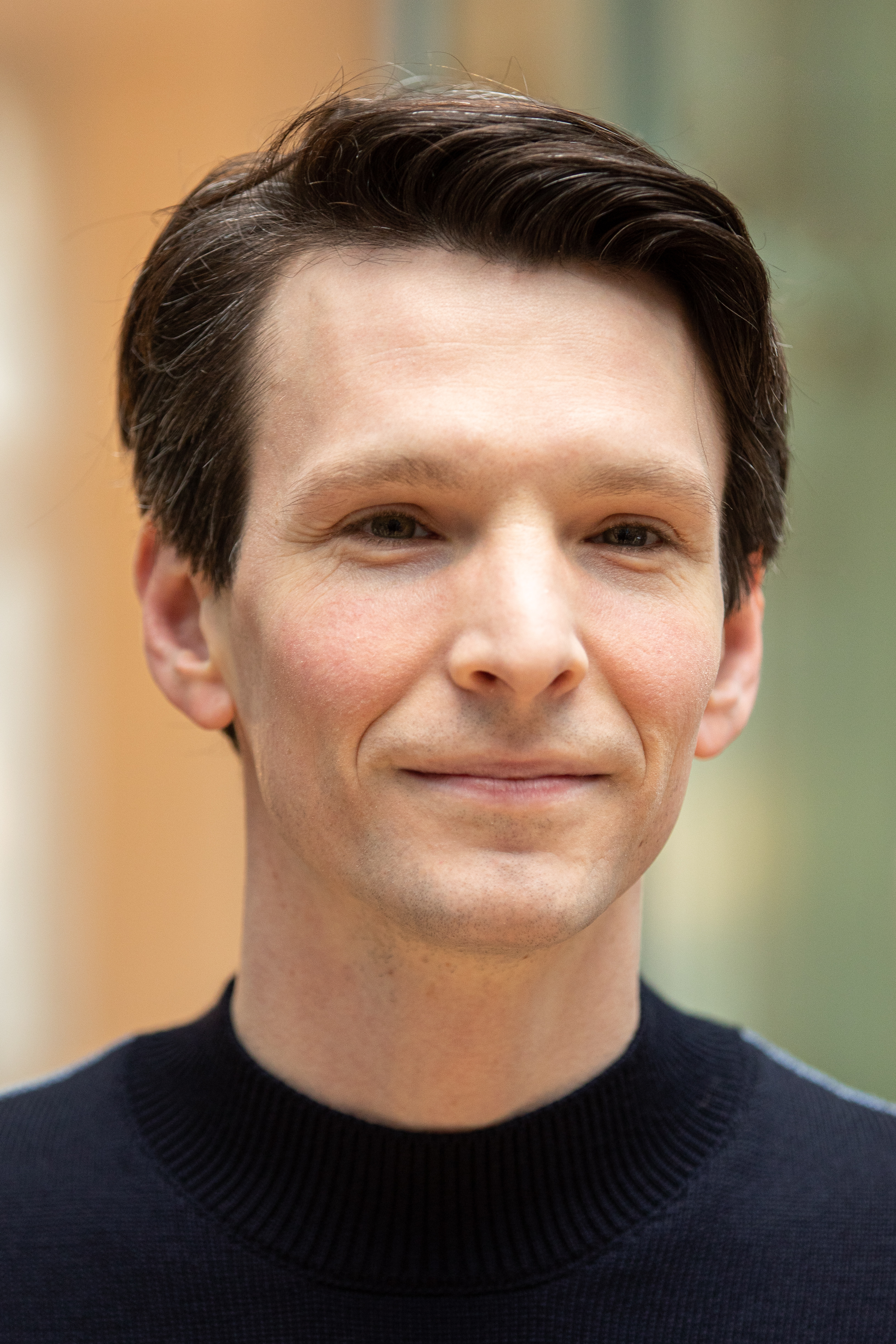
- Born: 18 November 1984 (age 41); Târgu Mureș, Romania
- Occupation: Actor
- Years active: 2009–present

Sabin Tambrea (born 18 November 1984) is a German actor. He is best known for his role as Ludwig II of Bavaria in Ludwig II.

== Personal life ==
Tambrea was born in Romania and moved to Germany at the age of three. He married actress Alice Dwyer in 2018.

== Selected filmography ==
Film
Year	Title	Role	Notes
2012	Ludwig II	Ludwig II of Bavaria	
2016	Marie Curie: The Courage of Knowledge		
2017	Iceman	Tasar	
2017	The Whistlers	Zsolt	
2020	Narcissus and Goldmund	Monk Narziss	
2023	The Interpreter of Silence	Dr. Fritz Jerichow	
2024	The Glory of Life	Franz Kafka	
2024	Calendar Killer	Jules	

TV
Year	Title	Role	Notes
2015	Naked Among Wolves		
2016	Ku'damm 56	Joachim Frank	
2016	Berlin Station	Julian De Vos	
2020	Babylon Berlin	Tristan Rot	
