= Kafka project =

Research project to discover lost Kafka writings

The Kafka Project is a non-profit literary research initiative founded in 1998 at San Diego State University. Working on behalf of the Kafka estate in London, England, the SDSU Kafka Project is working to recover materials written by Franz Kafka, the widely acclaimed modernist author, stolen by the Gestapo in 1933. The search continues in Eastern Europe and Israel.

The SDSU Kafka Project, headed by SDSU adjunct professor and biographer Kathi Diamant, with an international board of advisors, is searching for Kafka's notebooks and letters written in correspondence to Dora Diamant, his lover at the time of his death in 1924, as well as Dora's correspondence with Kafka's friend, literary executor and first biographer Max Brod. Kafka's missing writings consist of 35 letters written to Dora Diamant between 1923–1924 and up to 20 notebooks, representing the last year of his life. The contents of these letters and notebooks is unknown and has never been published. The 70 letters that Dora wrote to Max Brod between 1924 and 1952 are amongst the hotly contested Brod Collection. Dora Diamant's letters to Max Brod contain information to further identify the missing materials

Kafka requested that all his extant writings be destroyed. However, Dora secretly kept them in her Berlin home. Following the Nazi takeover in 1933, the Gestapo ransacked her Berlin flat and confiscated every piece of paper, looking for Communist propaganda. In the early 1930s, Dora and her husband, Lutz Lask, were members of the KPD and Lask was the editor of the illegal Communist organ, "Die Rote Fahne." After the theft of her secret Kafka treasure, Dora contacted Max Brod to beg that he rescue the materials. Brod was told that the mountainous stacks of papers confiscated in the early days of Nazi rule made it impossible to recover at the time. In the mid-1950s, Brod, now living in Tel Aviv, worked with Kafka scholar and biographer Klaus Wagenbach to attempt recovery of Kafka's lost writings. However, their search ended at the Iron Curtain when the Berlin Chief of Police informed them Kafka's papers were most likely amongst confiscated materials taken out of Berlin in a train transport during the Allied bombing for safekeeping in Silesia.

The Kafka Project has conducted two extensive research projects, in 1998 in the German archives and in 2008 in Poland. The Kafka Project has been responsible for the discoveries of three original Kafka letters, Dora Diamant's missing diaries and letters, and the only extant personal possession of Kafka, his hairbrush. "also found in Kafka Project Discoveries", Kafka Project. The Project has been supported by the Hadassah Research Institute Brandeis University, the Weingart Foundation, the Ludwig Vogelstein Foundation, Hedgebrook, and individual donors.
