= Caroline von Wolzogen =

German writer of Weimar Classicism

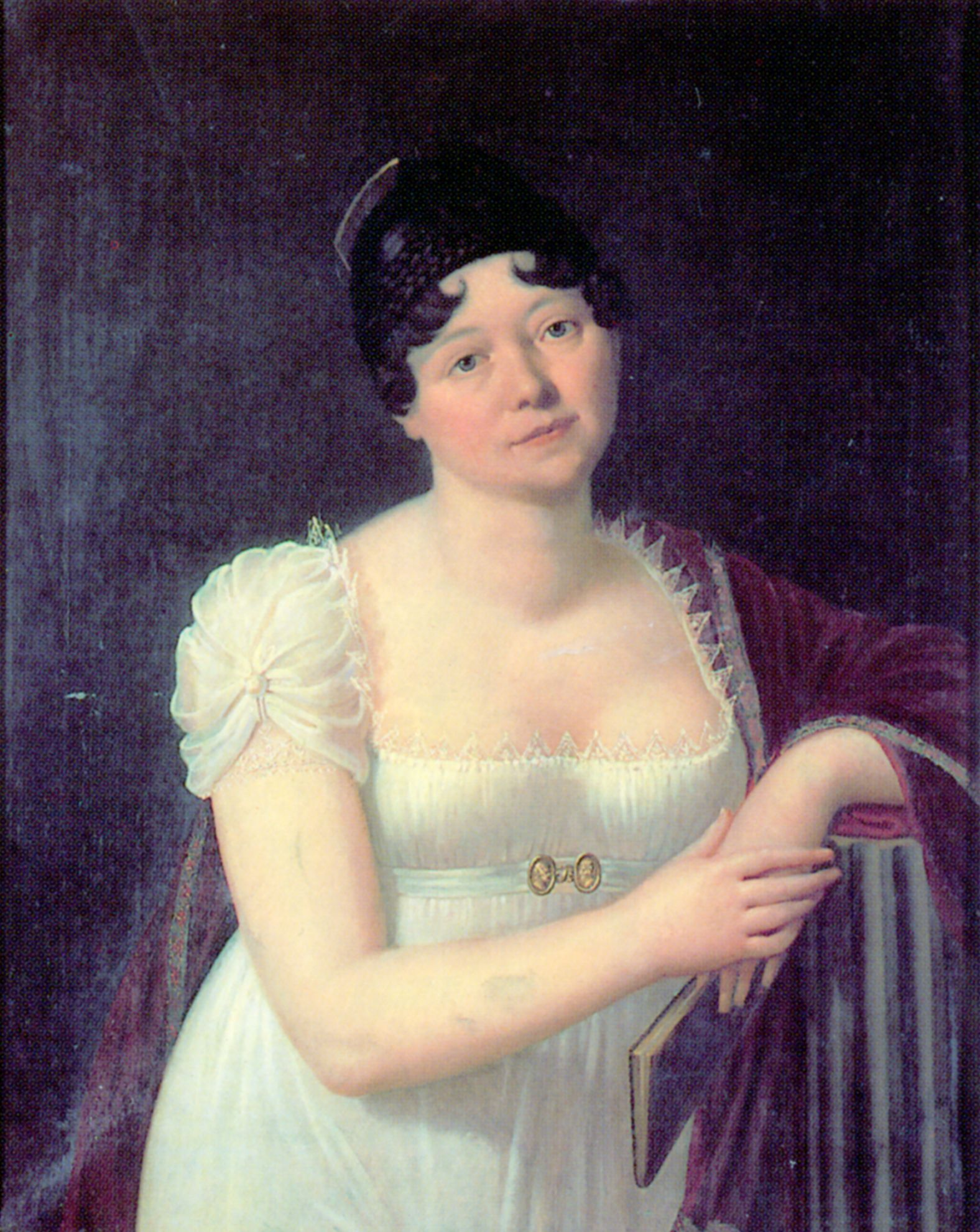
- Caroline von Wolzogen in a portrait by Carl von Ambère, 1808
- Born: Caroline von Lengefeld; 3 February 1763; Rudolstadt, Schwarzburg-Rudolstadt, Holy Roman Emperor
- Died: 11 January 1847 (aged 83); Jena, Saxe-Weimar-Eisenach, Holy Roman Emperor
- Spouses: Friedrich Wilhelm Ludwig von Beulwitz; Wilhelm von Wolzogen
- Writing career
- Language: German
- Notable work: Agnes von Lilien
- Literary movement: Weimar Classicism

Caroline von Wolzogen (née von Lengefeld; 3 February 1763 – 11 January 1847) was a German writer in the Weimar Classicism circle. Her best-known works are a novel, Agnes von Lilien, and a biography of Friedrich Schiller, her brother-in-law.

== Early life ==
Caroline von Lengefeld was the oldest child of an aristocratic family in Rudolstadt; she was raised and educated with a younger sister, Charlotte. Though her family belonged to the lower nobility, after her father died the financial situation was somewhat troubled. At 16, Caroline became engaged to Friedrich Wilhelm Ludwig von Beulwitz (1755–1829), a prominent local courtier, through the arrangement of both families. Much of her long engagement was spent with her family in Switzerland, a trip paid for by von Beulwitz; they married shortly after Caroline's return in 1784. Lacking shared interests, the marriage was unhappy from the start.

Caroline's closest confidante in the early years of her marriage was her cousin Wilhelm von Wolzogen, who, in 1785, introduced her and her sister to his friend Schiller, then a young and rather poor Weimar poet. In 1788, Schiller moved to a nearby town to be closer to the Lengefelds, and both Caroline and her sister became closer to him. Caroline felt a strong attraction toward him, though how far she considered taking it has been disputed by scholars. Schiller became engaged to Charlotte in August 1789, and credited Caroline for bringing them together. In the early 1790s, inspired by her friendship with Schiller and other literary figures in Weimar, Caroline began writing herself; her first substantial work was a dramatic fragment in classical form, Der leukadische Fels, in 1792.

== Agnes von Lilien ==
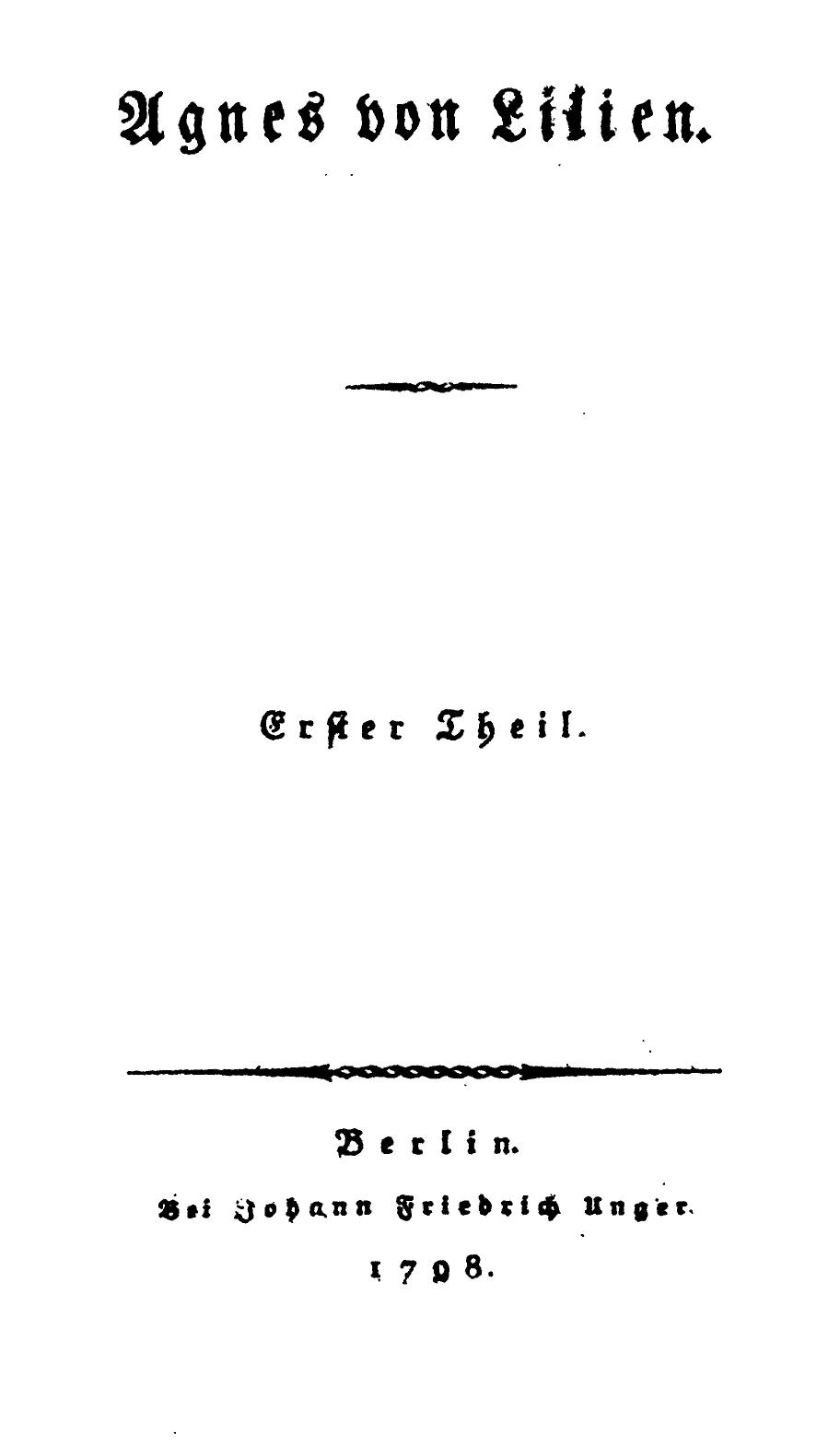
Title page of the 1798 edition of Agnes von Lilien

Caroline von Beulwitz began writing her first novel, Agnes von Lilien, in 1793. The novel describes a young woman raised by a stepfather and growing up in isolation in the countryside, poor but educated in both classical and modern learning. A meeting with a much older and wealthier man, with whom she falls in love, begins a process of discovery of the world at large, including the politics and scandals of court life. Agnes eventually discovers that her own background, previously unknown to her, ties her closely to that world, which she eventually embraces. As one critic has said, despite its interest in female subjectivity, "Agnes von Lilien is less about the establishment of a new society than it is about the restoration of the old to new legitimacy."

In 1795, Schiller began a new periodical called Die Horen, which would contain articles on philosophy and history as well as fiction, organized around the central tenets of Weimar classicism. Knowing his sister-in-law was writing, Schiller asked for a submission, and Agnes von Lilien was published anonymously in Die Horen in installments, from 1796 to 1797. This publication, and its eventual publication as a two-volume novel (still anonymous) in 1798, led to considerable attention for the novel, and speculation as to its author's identity. Some believed it was a work of Schiller's, and others a work of Goethe's, though Friedrich Schlegel was quick to dismiss the latter claim. The fuss eventually led to the revelation of its true author, who was treated to much celebration, albeit short-lived.

After this brief burst of activity and fame, Caroline's literary output greatly slowed, and her other major works were written at a much later date, toward the end of her life. She and the other women writers included in Die Horen demonstrated a new potential for both aesthetically and commercially successful writing by women, but the ultimate role of women in the Weimar circle, and the intellectual legacy of works like Agnes von Lilien, has been debated. Critic Peter McIsaac has observed that, though they included women writers in Die Horen, Schiller and Goethe wrote of expunging their "feminine" qualities, and continued to regard works by women as "dilettantish" and belonging to a lower form than their own work. The novel was republished in 1988, and has gotten much more widespread and sympathetic treatment since.

== Weimar literary life ==
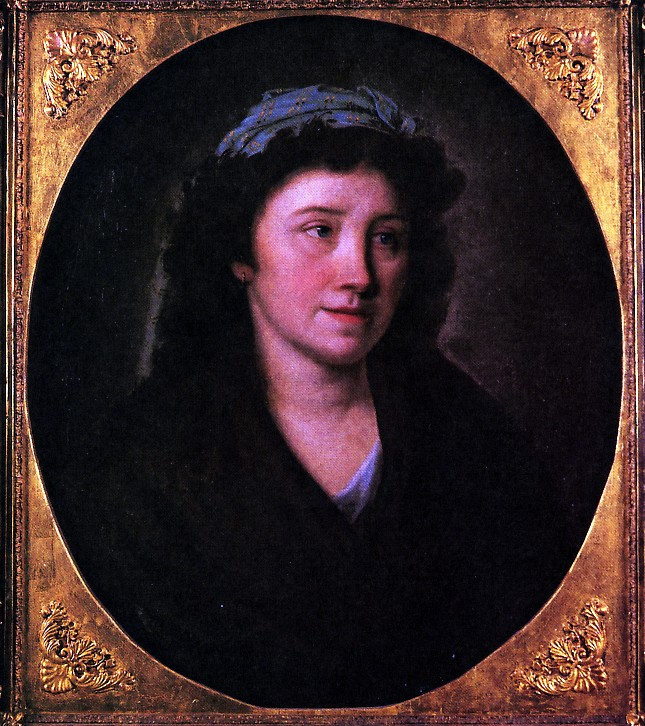
Caroline von Wolzogen in a portrait by Philipp Friedrich Hetsch, circa 1800

Between the writing and publication of Agnes von Lilien, Caroline's life had changed markedly. In 1794, after years of unhappiness, she left von Beulwitz and married Wilhelm von Wolzogen, the cousin who had introduced her to Schiller. Her family, including Schiller, responded negatively to this decision, and she and von Wolzogen spent the next two years removed from their relations, primarily in Stein am Rhein, Switzerland. The von Wolzogens returned to Weimar in 1796, where the success of Agnes von Lilien created new connections for Caroline in the literary world. In 1802 she was contacted by Anne Louise Germaine de Staël, who had read and admired the novel, which led to an extended visit and correspondence between de Staël and the Weimar circle.

After Schiller's death in 1805 and the subsequent growth of his literary reputation, Caroline von Wolzogen began collecting correspondence and reminiscences of her and her sister's life with the poet. These were published under the title Schillers Leben (Schiller's Life) in 1830, the first biography of Schiller to be published. In the biography, Caroline depicted her subject as a man continually beset by illness and dying young, but whose determination to carry on with his literary efforts nonetheless is cast as heroic. As the first biography and the only one written by an intimate associate, it has remained the first source for most biographical work on Schiller ever since.

In the final years of her life, decades after Agnes, Caroline von Wolzogen wrote her second and final novel, Cordelia, which was published in 1840. Set during the Wars of Liberation, the novel centers around a woman torn between an obscure soldier she loves and an aristocrat she is pressured to marry by her family. The novel celebrates the soldier's national devotion even while Cordelia marries the aristocrat, albeit without consummating the marriage.

Two years after her death in 1847, her letters and unpublished manuscripts were published as Literary Remains.

== Publications ==
Karoline von Wolzogen's published works as cited by An Encyclopedia of Continental Women Writers, unless otherwise indicated.

- Briefe aus der Schweiz [Letters from Switzerland], 1792
- Der Leukadische Fels [The Leucadian Rock], a play. Leipzig: Göschen, 1792.
- Agnes von Lilien. Berlin: J. F. Unger, 1796, 1798, 1800, 1801. Republished Stuttgart: W. Spemann, 1884.
- Walther und Nanny [Walther and Nanny], 1802.
- Erzählungen von der Verfasserin der Agnes von Lilien [Tales from the Author of Agnes von Lilien]. Tübingen : J. G. Cotta'sche Buchhandlung, 1826
- Schillers Leben. Verfasst aus Erinnerungen der Familie, seinen eigenen Briefen und den Nachrichten seines Freundes Körner [Schiller's Life. Composed out of Memories of the Family, His Own Letters and News From His Friend Körner]. Stuttgart: J. B. Cotta, 1830.
- Adele, 1839.
- Cordelia. Leipzig: F. A. Brockhaus, 1840.
- Das neue Jahr [The New Year], 1842.
- Literarischer Nachlass der Frau Caroline von Wolzogen [Literary Remains of Lady Caroline von Wolzogen]. Leipzig, Breitkopf und Härtel, 1849.
- Gesammelte Schriften [Collected Works]. Hildesheim: Olms, 1988.

== See also ==
- Beloved Sisters [Die geliebten Schwestern], a 2014 German biographical film.
