= The Girl and the Spider =

- Promotional release poster
- German: Das Mädchen und die Spinne
- Directed by: Ramon Zürcher; Silvan Zürcher
- Written by: Ramon Zürcher; Silvan Zürcher
- Produced by: Adrian Blaser; Aline Schmid
- Starring: Henriette Confurius; Liliane Amuat
- Cinematography: Alexander Haßkerl
- Edited by: Katharina Bhend; Ramon Zürcher
- Music by: Philipp Moll
- Production companies: Beauvoir Films; Schweizer Radio und Fernsehen; Zürcher Film
- Distributed by: Edition Salzgeber; Xenix Filmdistribution
- Release date: July 8, 2021 (Berlinale)
- Running time: 99 minutes
- Country: Switzerland
- Language: German

The Girl and the Spider (German: Das Mädchen und die Spinne) is a 2021 Swiss drama film written and directed by Ramon and Silvan Zürcher. The film centres on Mara (Henriette Confurius) and Lisa (Liliane Amuat), two women who have been living together, and portrays the emotional complications as Lisa moves out to a new apartment.

The film premiered in the Encounters program at the 71st Berlin International Film Festival, where the Zürchers won the award for Best Director in the program alongside Denis Côté for Social Hygiene (Hygiène sociale). It had its North American premiere at the 46th Toronto International Film Festival.

== Cast ==
- Henriette Confurius as Mara
- Liliane Amuat as Lisa
- Ursina Lardi as Astrid
- Flurin Giger as Jan
- André Hennicke as Jurek
- Ivan Georgiev as Markus
- Dagna Litzenberger-Vinet as Kerstin
- Lea Draeger as Nora
- Sabine Timoteo as Karen
- Birte Schnöink as

== Reception ==
On Rotten Tomatoes the film has a 93% rating based on 29 reviews, with an average rating of 7.4/10. The critics consensus reads: "Beneath its deceptively placid surface, The Girl and the Spider grapples with deeply meaningful questions of personal identity in the face of fundamental change." On Metacritic, the film holds a weighted average score of 83 out of 100, based on 11 critics, indicating "universal acclaim".
