= The Interpreter of Silence =

German television limited series

- Genre: Historical drama
- Created by: Annette Hess
- Directed by: Isabel Prahl; Randa Chahoud
- Starring: Katharina Stark; Aaron Altaras; Max von der Groeben; Thomas Prenn; Anke Engelke; Iris Berben; Heiner Lauterbach; Hans-Jochen Wagner; Ricarda Seifried; Uwe Preuss; Sabin Tambrea; Henry Hübchen
- Music by: Dascha Dauenhauer
- Countries of origin: Germany; Poland
- Original languages: German; Polish; Yiddish
- No. of seasons: 1
- No. of episodes: 5

Production
- Executive producer: Sabine de Mardt
- Cinematography: Andreas Köhler; Julian Hohndorf
- Editors: Daniel Scheuch; Adrienne Hudson; Andrea Mertens
- Running time: 56-63 minutes
- Production company: Gaumont GmbH

Original release
- Network: Disney+
- Release: November 15, 2023

The Interpreter of Silence is a 2023 German historical drama television limited series based on the 2018 novel Deutsches Haus (The German House) by Annette Hess. The world premiere took place on November 8, 2023, at the Zoo Palast in Berlin. The five-episode series was released on Disney+ on November 15, 2023, as Star Original. The series has received critical acclaim, praising directing, writing as well as the lead performances. It received a nomination at the 29th Critics' Choice Awards for "Best Foreign Language Series".

== Synopsis ==
In the backdrop of Frankfurt am Main in 1963, Eva Bruhns, a young woman working as an interpreter for Polish language, lives with her family above the "Deutsches Haus", a renowned pub that is run by her parents Edith and Ludwig. Eva is unexpectedly summoned to the court for a criminal trial, necessitating her services as an interpreter. Initially assuming it's a routine commercial or contract law case, she unwittingly translates witness statements using business terms, only to discover, when corrected by the prosecutor, that it is the first Auschwitz trial in Frankfurt – prosecuting former SS members for crimes at the Auschwitz concentration camp. Despite facing opposition from her parents and well-to-do fiancé Jürgen and having never heard of Auschwitz before, Eva feels an internal obligation to persist as an interpreter. As the trial unfolds, she comprehends the staggering extent of the Nazi extermination machinery, realizing a personal connection to this harrowing place. Amid the prevailing hypocritical normality of post-war Germany, Eva proceeds in her role in court, unveiling a concealed chapter of history marked by atrocities, suffering, and guilt. Undeterred by generational suppression, she tenaciously advances the criminal case while confronting the secrets of her very own family entwined with a brutal truth.

== Cast and characters ==
=== Main ===
- Katharina Stark as Eva Bruhns, an interpreter for Polish language who takes part in court as translator in the Frankfurt Auschwitz trials
- Aaron Altaras as David Miller, a representative of the prosecution
- Max von der Groeben as Hans Kübler, a state prosecutor in the trial
- Thomas Prenn as Jürgen Schoormann, Eva's fiancé-to-be and heir of his father's mail-order company
- Anke Engelke as Edith Bruhns, Eva's mother who runs the restaurant Deutsches Haus with her husband Ludwig
- Iris Berben as Rachel Cohen, a Jewish Auschwitz survivor and witness to the prosecution
- Heiner Lauterbach as Wilhelm Boger, a defendant in the trial
- Hans-Jochen Wagner as Ludwig Bruhns, Eva's father who runs the restaurant Deutsches Haus with his wife Edith
- Ricarda Seifried as Annegret Bruhns, Eva's sister who works as a nurse in a hospital
- Uwe Preuss as Hans Hofmeyer, the Chief Judge in the trial
- Sabin Tambrea as Dr. Fritz Jerichow, a counsel for the defense in the trial
- Henry Hübchen as Walther Schoormann, Jürgen's father and owner of a mail-order company

=== Recurring ===
- Thomas Bading as Fritz Bauer, the lead prosecutor in the trial
- Martin Horn as Robert Mulka, a defendant in the trial

== Episodes ==
No.	Title	Directed by	Written by	Original release date
1	"The Engagement"	Isabel Prahl	Annette Hess	15 November 2023
It is December 1963 and Eva introduces her family to her boyfriend Jürgen. During the meal, Eva is called by her boss with a last-minute request to work as a Polish-German interpreter in a trial. Later, she translates the statement of an elderly Polish man detailing how hundreds of people were gassed to death in 1941. The account shakes her to the core. At the Christmas market, Eva helps an elderly Polish woman and discovers that she, too, is in the city to testify in the trial against SS officers. On the first day of the trial, Eva hears the charges and for the first time learns about Auschwitz and the atrocities committed there. Jürgen is waiting for her at home, having asked her father for her hand in marriage. Eva tells Jürgen and her family that she intends to interpret at the trial.
2	"Rachel Cohen"	Isabel Prahl	Annette Hess	15 November 2023
Eva takes the oath in court and nervously starts to interpret. Jürgen doesn't support her decision to take the job, but nevertheless introduces Eva to his father and stepmother. In court, a Jewish woman called Rachel Cohen identifies one of the defendants as the officer in charge of "selection" on the camp's arrival platform. She also confronts the defendants who claim to have known nothing about the gas chambers. After giving her statement, she leaves the courthouse in an agitated state. On the street she is hit by car and dies shortly thereafter. Eva witnesses the whole thing. That evening, still in a state of shock, Eva helps her parents in the restaurant. All of a sudden, the lead defendant Mulka appears. He seems to know Eva's mother and spits on the ground in front of her. But why?
3	"The Father"	Isabel Prahl	Annett Hess	15 November 2023
Eva's parents Edith and Ludwig deny knowing the Mulkas. The defendant Wilhelm Boger tells his family that it may take some time before he is released from prison. Diana goes to visit her Italian lover and reveals to her mother that she is pregnant, while Eva questions her parents about the Mulkas. Jürgen and Eva try to spend time together as a couple, but Jürgen is unable to have sex with Eva. In the family living room, Eva discovers a child's drawing that she later recognizes as very similar to the staff housing at Auschwitz. In search of the truth, Eva looks for her father's name in the file listing the officers who served at Auschwitz. She finds it and confronts her parents and her sister about having lived at Auschwitz.
4	"The Site"	Randa Chahoud	Annette Hess	15 November 2023
Eva and Jürgen are engaged, but Eva is struggling to come to terms with her parents' past. Jürgen sees Eva's distress and asks the prosecutor's office to release her from her duties. Eva is furious and breaks off their engagement. A delegation from the court travels to Auschwitz to get a firsthand impression of the camp layout and circumstances. Visiting the camp has a profound impact on everyone involved. In the guesthouse that evening, David Miller is provoked into a fight. He confesses to Eva and Kübler that he lied about his family been in the Auschwitz death camp. Eva does not want him to be alone that night and stays with him. The next day, David has vanished, but the members of the delegation must take their flight back to Germany.
5	"The Verdict"	Randa Chahoud	Annette Hess	15 November 2023
Back in Frankfurt, Eva discovers that her father has had a heart attack and is in hospital. When Mulka is finally convicted of having known about the gas chambers after presenting new evidence, Eva's mother Edith Bruhns is called as a defense witness. Eva learns that her parents denounced the defendant Mulka in 1943 for making subversive statements. Eva leaves the court, breaks off contact with her parents, and moves out of the family home. She quits her job, the sentences are pronounced and are shockingly lenient. Eva travels to Kraków to see a Jewish hairdresser from Auschwitz who she remembers from her childhood. She asks for forgiveness, but he refuses to absolve her of her guilt. Matured, Eva returns to Frankfurt where she applies to be an interpreter in the follow-up trial.

== Reception ==
The reviews of the limited series were very positive. The online magazine Neues Deutschland described The Interpreter of Silence as the best real-life fiction the genre has ever produced. The Neue Zürcher Zeitung also praised the series as an "outstanding mini-series" that captures the "mendacious silence in post-war Germany". According to the Frankfurter Allgemeine Zeitung, the strengths of the miniseries lie above all in the dramaturgy, "which attempts to do justice to the subject matter with as many facets as possible, without being overly didactic". BR24 reviewed it as "the best German series of the year".
