= Katharina Stark =

German actress (born 1998)

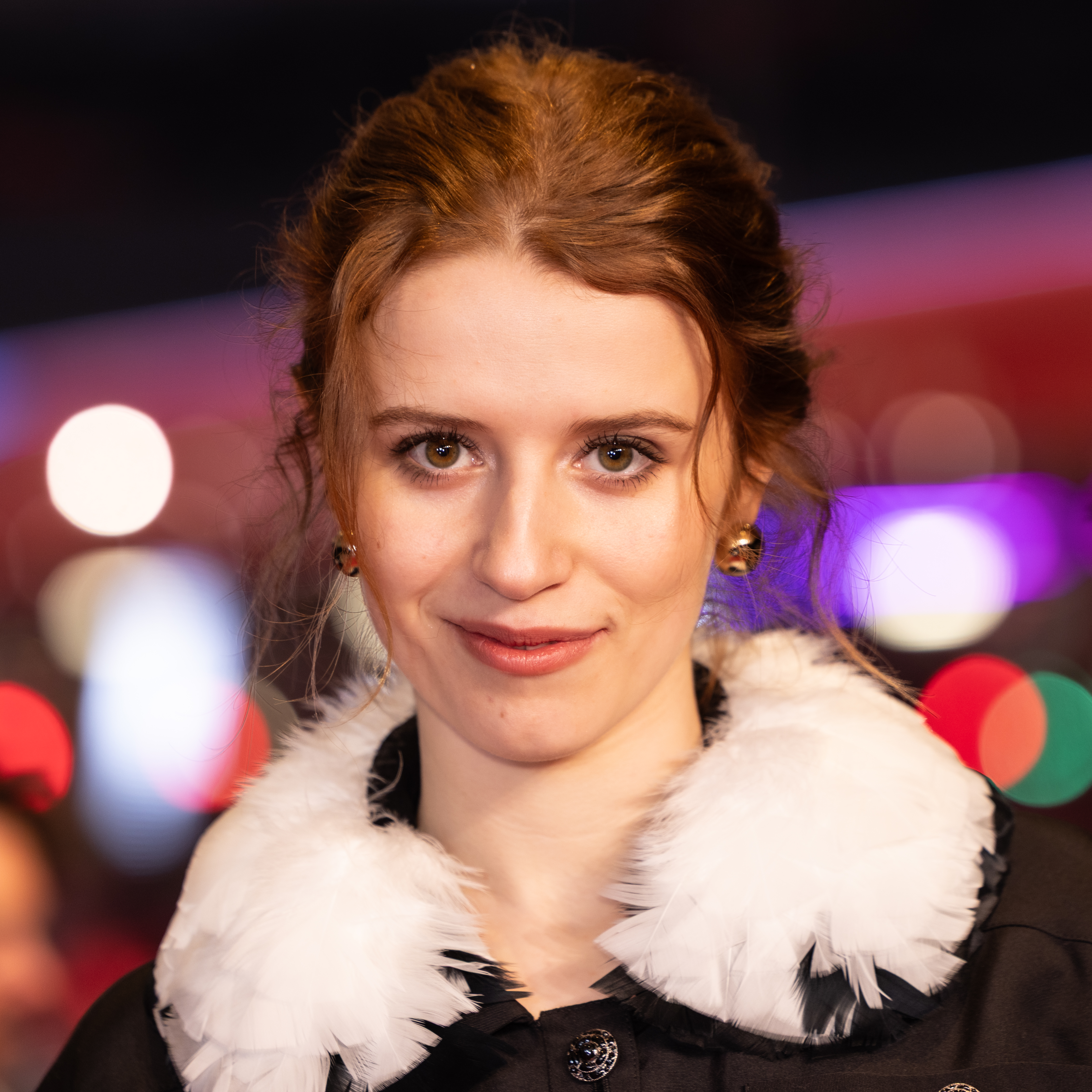
- Stark at the 75th Berlin International Film Festival
- Born: 26 September 1998 (age 28); Illertissen, Bavaria, Germany
- Years active: 2016–present
- Notable work: The Interpreter of Silence

Katharina Stark (born 26 September 1998) is a German actress. In 2024 she was awarded the European Shooting Star Award.

== Biography ==
Stark was born on 26 September 1998 in Illertissen. She has said that she has always wanted to be an actress. When she was eight years old, she began taking acting classes in Munich, roughly 90 minutes from Illertissen. Show got her first acting role at 15, in a film called King Laurin. Stark struggled to balance acting with school during this time, sometimes needing to the film shoot on the same day as completing her Abitur exams.

Following positive reception of the film, Stark took a number of one-off jobs in episodes of popular German television programs. After high school, Stark studied at the Otto Falckenberg School of the Performing Arts. While studying, she got her first lead role in a series, playing Eva Bruhns in The Interpreter of Silence, a historical drama about the Auschwitz trial. Stark later starred in Nuremberg 45, which follows Seweryna Szmaglewska, an Auchwitz survivor and witness at the Nuremberg trials. Stark said that "it's important to consider the social impact of the stories you tell".

In 2024, Stark was awarded the European Shooting Star Award, a film award for up-and-coming young actors, for her performance in The Interpreter of Silence. The judges of the award said that she played "an emotionally charged and demanding role with ease".

Stark has said that she would like to act in English-language productions, having only played parts in German films and series so far. She has also written scripts for several short films, and is planning to write a feature-length film. Outside of acting, Stark studies health sciences, and enjoys playing music and doing sports such as skiing and horse riding.

== Filmography ==
Film
Year	Title	Ref.
2016	King Laurin	
2018	Der Staatsfeind	
2022	Und ihr schaut zu	
2023	Dead Girls Dancing	
2024	Bernhard Hoetger - Zwischen den Welten	
2025	I Am the Greatest	
2025	Franz	
2025	Ein Abend im Dezember	
2025	Nuremberg 45	
2026	23 000 Leben	
2026	Ach, diese Lücke, diese entsetzliche Lücke	

Television
Year	Title	Ref.
2017	Dahoam is Dahoam	
2017	Inga Lindström	
2017	Kreuzfahrt ins Glück	
2018	SOKO München	
2018	Tatort	
2018	In aller Freundschaft - Die jungen Ärzte	
2018	The Team	
2019	Der Alte	
2021	Heiter bis tödlich: Morden im Norden	
2021	In aller Freundschaft	
2022–2024	Polizeiruf 110	
2023	The Interpreter of Silence	
