= Phantoms of July =

2025 German comedy drama film

- Promotional poster
- German: Sehnsucht in Sangerhausen
- Literally: Longing in Sangerhausen
- Directed by: Julian Radlmaier
- Screenplay by: Julian Radlmaier
- Produced by: Kirill Krasovski
- Starring: Clara Schwinning; Maral Keshavarz; Henriette Confurius; Paula Schindler
- Cinematography: Faraz Fesharaki
- Edited by: Julian Radlmaier
- Production company: Blue Monticola Film
- Distributed by: Grandfilm
- Release dates: 7 August 2025 (Locarno); 27 November 2025 (Germany)
- Running time: 90 minutes
- Country: Germany
- Languages: German; Iranian

Phantoms of July (German: Sehnsucht in Sangerhausen) is a 2025 German comedy drama film written and directed by Julian Radlmaier. The film is a romantic adventure that explores an unexpected friendship and a deep yearning for a different life.

The film had its world premiere at the 78th Locarno Film Festival on 7 August 2025, in the Main Competition section, where it competed for Golden Leopard.

== Cast ==
- Clara Schwinning as Ursula
- Maral Keshavarz as Neda
- Paula Schindler as Lotte (historic plot)
- Henriette Confurius as Zulima
- Ghazal Shojaei as Marjam
- Kyung-Taek Lie as Sung-Nam
- Buksori Lie as Buk
- Marlene Hauser as Daniella the cellist
- Jérémie Galiana as Paul the viola player
- Jérémie Galiana as wanderer Paul
- Andreas Bittl as wanderer Horst
- Jakob Schmidt as Norbert (historic plot)
- Luise von Stein as Grete (historic plot)
- Valerie Neuenfels as Frau Markgraf
- Leonard Scheicher as Robert, car mechanic
- Nils Ramme as Novalis (historic plot)

== Production ==
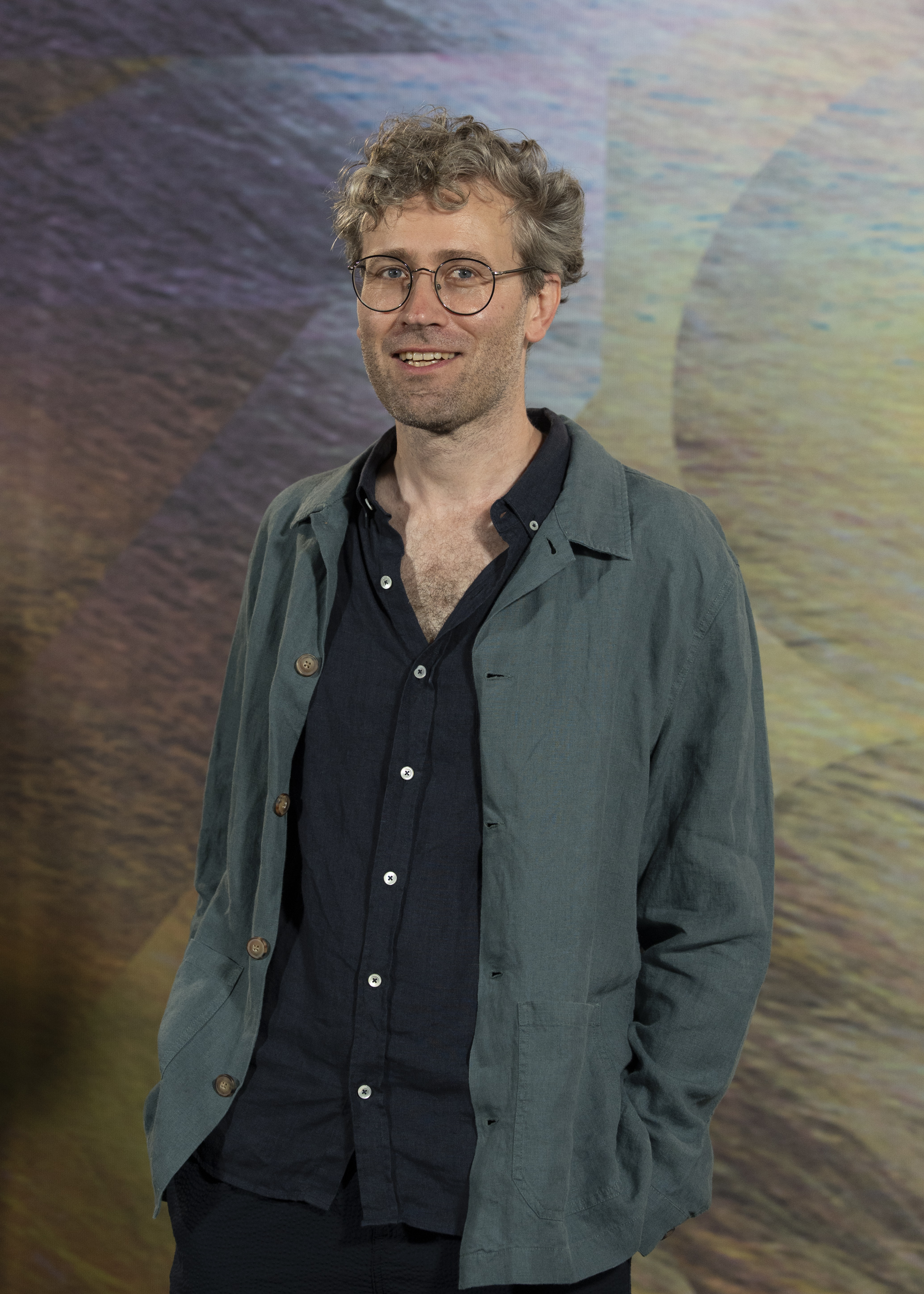
Julian Radlmaier, director of the film

Principal photography began on 29 July 2024 in the regions of Saxony-Anhalt, and Thuringia in Germany. The filming ended on 12 September 2024.

== Release ==
Phantoms of July had its World Premiere at the 78th Locarno Film Festival on 7 August 2025, and competed for Golden Leopard. It was also showcased at the 31st Sarajevo Film Festival in 'Kinoscope' section in August. It was also presented in the World Cinema section at the 30th Busan International Film Festival on 18 September 2025. It also made it to the 'Meeting Point' slate of the 70th Valladolid International Film Festival.

It was also screened in International Perspective at the São Paulo International Film Festival on 17 October 2025.

It had its Australian Premiere as part of the feature fiction at the Adelaide Film Festival on 18 October 2025. It will be presented in 'Cinema of the World - 2025' section of the 56th International Film Festival of India in November 2025.

The film will be released on 27 November 2025 in the German cinemas.

== Reception ==
In his review at Locarno, Joseph Jenner of the International Cinephile Society rated the film with 4 stars out of five and praised the director Julian Radlmaier and called him "the heir apparent to the likes of Peter Greenaway." Jenner opined that the film stands out as a thoughtful and imaginative cultural critique, envisioning an ideal world where harmony prevails. He further described the film as vibrant, distinctive, and thoroughly engaging. Concluding review Jenner wrote that Phantoms of July is one of the year’s most captivating works, demanding careful "attention and patience," yet "where the reward is worth absolutely every minute of our time."

== Accolades ==
Award	Date of ceremony	Category	Recipient	Result	Ref.
Locarno Film Festival	16 August 2025	Golden Leopard	Phantoms of July	Nominated	
