= Henriette Confurius =

German actress (born 1991)

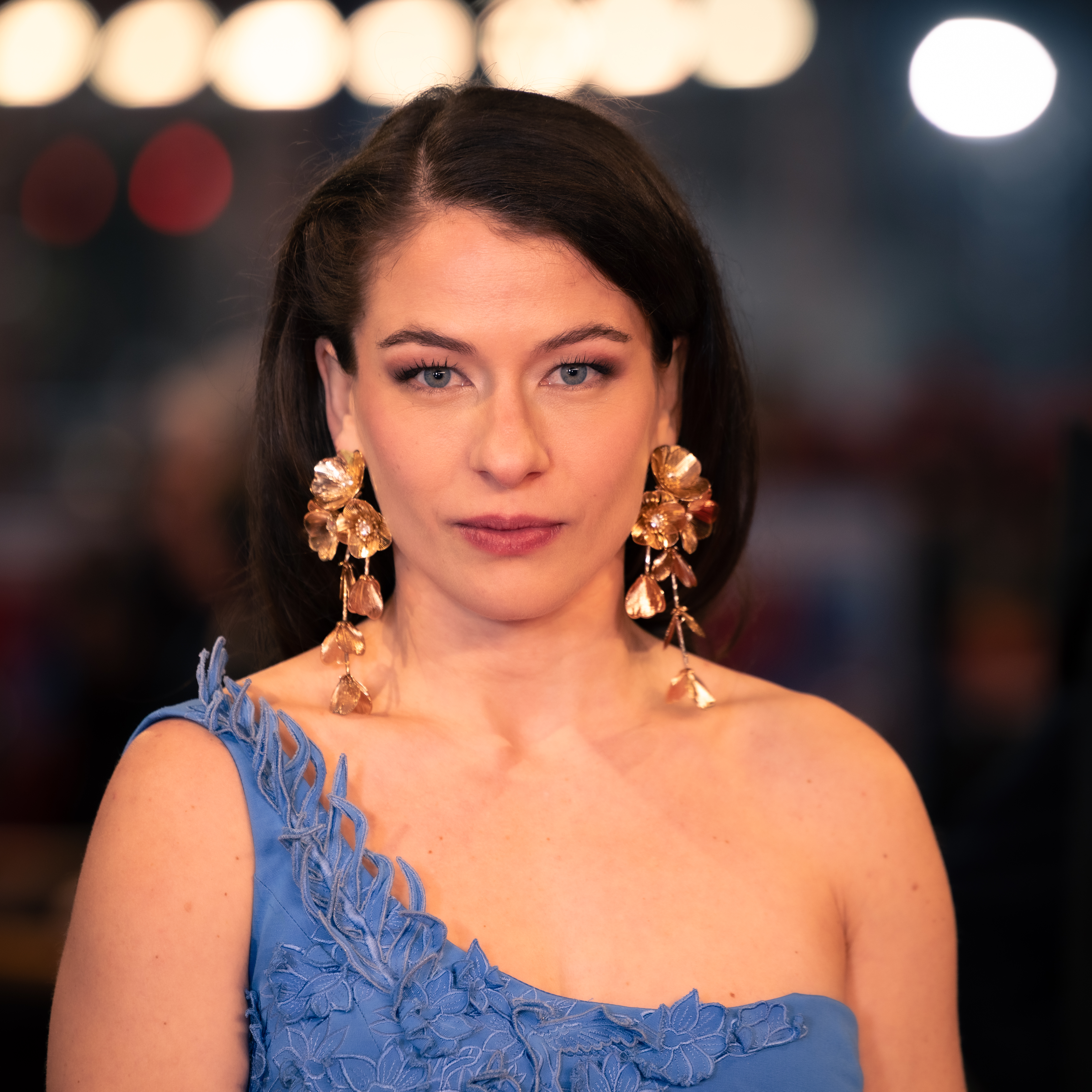
- Confurius in 2025
- Born: 5 February 1991 (age 35); Berlin, Germany
- Occupation: Actress
- Years active: 2001–present

Henriette Confurius (born 5 February 1991) is a German actress known to international audiences for her role in the Netflix sci-fi television series Tribes of Europa.

== Life and career ==
Henriette Confurius' father is German-Dutch writer Gerrit Confurius, her mother is a Dutch theatre actress, and she has two brothers, Lucas and Carl, who are also actors. She did not study acting and moved around during her youth. She studied hand-skilled trades but says "I always went back to acting sooner or later".

She is noted for her role as Kayla in the film The Countess. In Wir sind wieder wer, she played a young German woman who falls in love with a member of the American occupying force (Jerry Hoffmann). The film received the 2012 No Fear Award at the First Steps Awards. Confurius played the main role of Charlotte von Lengefeld in the 2014 film Beloved Sisters.

In 2021, she was cast as the lead in the Netflix series Tribes of Europa.

== Selected filmography ==
Film
Year	Title	Role	Notes
2009	The Countess	Kayla	
2011	Lessons of a Dream	Rosalie	
2014	Beloved Sisters	Charlotte von Lengefeld	
2016	Fog in August	Sister Edith Kiefer	
2021	The Girl and the Spider	Mara	
2022	The Silent Forest	Anja Grimm	
2024	The Glory of Life	Dora Diamant	
2025	Phantoms of July	Zulima	Set to premiere at the 78th Locarno Film Festival

Television
Year	Title	Role	Notes
2003	Polizeiruf 110	Kim Krinowsky	1 episode
2004	Bella Block	Laura Hoffmann	1 episode
2005	Ein starkes Team	Jenny	1 episode
2007	Tatort	Julia März	1 episode
2007	Notruf Hafenkante	Svenja	1 episode
2007	In aller Freundschaft	Kristin Schreiber	1 episode
2009	Die Wölfe	Lotte	1 episode
2009	Ein Fall für zwei	Romy Kobilke	1 episode
2010	Küstenwache	Clara Eschenbach	1 episode
2011	Tatort	Nele Klarbach	1 episode
2012	SOKO Wismar	Ilka Carstensen	1 episode
2012	Die Bergretter	Paula Gastein	1 episode
2012	Countdown – Die Jagd beginnt	Lola Heinrich	1 episode
2013	Tatort	Kalter Engel	1 episode
2015–18	Tannbach	Anna von Striesow	6 episodes
2021	Tribes of Europa	Liv	6 episodes
2023	Transatlantic	Lena Fischmann	7 episodes
