= Dora Diamant =

Polish-Yiddish actress

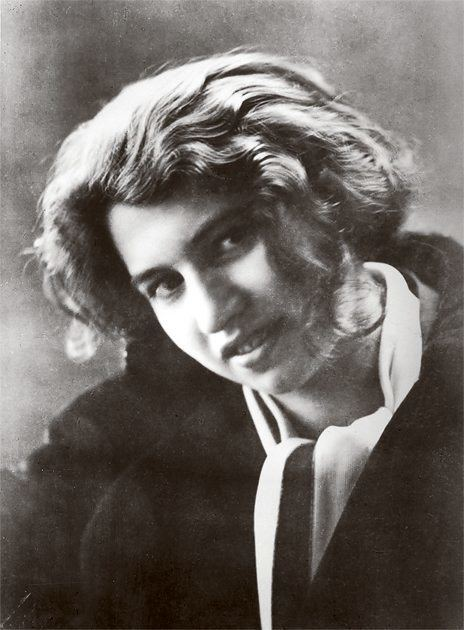
- Portrait of Diamant, 1920s
- Born: c.1900 Pabianice, Piotrków Governorate, Congress Poland
- Died: 15 August 1952; Plaistow, County Borough of West Ham, Essex, England
- Other names: Dora Dymant
- Citizenship: Polish
- Occupation(s): Teacher, actress
- Known for: Last lover of writer Franz Kafka
- Spouse: Lutz Lask (m. 1932)
- Partner: Franz Kafka (1923–24)

Dora Diamant (Dwojra Diament, also Dymant) (c. 1900 – 1952) (Note: According to biographer Kathi Diamant, "By most accounts, including hers, Dora Diamant was only nineteen when she met Kafka ... in July 1923. However, Gestapo files list her birthdate as 1898 (not 1903) and her husband's SED files indicate that she was born in 1900, which is the date recorded on her death certificate in London, England.") (Note: Kathi Diamant also writes that, in Franz Kafka: A Biography, Max Brod "had written that Dora 'must have been nineteen or twenty' when she met Kafka [meaning that she had been born in 1903 or 1904]. From then on, Dora dropped those six years from her age [meaning that she had really been born in 1897 or 1898], and for the rest of her life she maintained Brod's version of the story, as least as it related to her age, in the public record.") is best remembered as the lover of the writer Franz Kafka and the person who kept some of his last writings in her possession until they were confiscated by the Gestapo in 1933. This retention was against the wishes of Kafka, who had requested shortly before his death that they be destroyed.

== Biography ==
From a Jewish family, Diamant was born in Pabianice, Congress Poland on 4 March 1898 (sources differ on her year of birth), the daughter of Herschel Dymant, a successful small businessman and a devout follower of the Hasidic dynasty in Ger. After her mother's death around 1912, the family relocated to Będzin, near the German border. At the end of World War I, after helping to raise her ten siblings, Dora refused to marry and was sent to Kraków to study to be a kindergarten teacher. She ran away and went to Berlin, where she worked in the Berlin Jewish community as a teacher and seamstress in an orphanage (and changed the spelling of her name to Diamant).

In July 1923, she was a volunteer at a camp "organized and run by the Berlin Jewish People's Home" at Graal-Müritz on the Baltic Sea, when she met Franz Kafka, who was 40 years old and suffering from tuberculosis. It was love at first sight, and they spent every day of the next three weeks together, making plans to live together in Berlin. In September, after returning briefly to Prague, Kafka moved to Berlin, where he and Dora shared three different flats before his tuberculosis required hospitalization. Dora stayed with him, moving even to the sanatorium outside Vienna where he died in her arms on 3 June 1924.

After Kafka's death, Diamant was criticized for burning Kafka's papers under his gaze and at his request during his last months of life, as well as for her decision to retain some of his journals and thirty-six of his letters to her. Despite Max Brod's request that she turn over to him all the Kafka papers in her possession, Diamant kept letters Kafka had written to her. Max Brod, along with others in possession of letters and related materials also chose not to comply with Kafka's final requests that all his writing be destroyed. Diamant also secretly kept an unknown number of Kafka's notebooks, which remained in her possession until they were stolen from her apartment, along with her other papers, in a 1933 Gestapo raid. It is not known which notebooks ended in Diamant's possession and which had already been passed on to Brod during Kafka's last illness. Searches for these missing papers have been conducted by Max Brod and German Kafka scholar Klaus Wagenbach in the 1950s, and since the 1990s by the Kafka Project, based at San Diego State University in California.

In the late 1920s, Dora studied theatre at the Academy for Dramatic Art of the Düsseldorf Playhouse and worked as a professional actress. She had a "great triumph and her first rave review" in 1928 as the female lead, Princess Alma, in Frank Wedekind's King Nicolo, or Such is Life. In the 1930s Dora joined the Communist Party of Germany (KPD) as an agitprop actress and married Ludwig (Lutz) Lask, editor of Die Rote Fahne, the KPD's newspaper. She gave birth to a daughter, Franziska Marianne Lask, named after Franz Kafka, on 1 March 1934. The daughter died in London in September 1982.

Dora escaped Germany with her daughter in 1936, joining her husband in Soviet Russia. After Lask was arrested in March 1938 and sent to "a labor camp on the Kolyma River on the Arctic Circle in far eastern Siberia" during Joseph Stalin's Great Purge, Dora left the Soviet Union, traveling across Europe, reaching safety in England one week before Germany invaded Poland in 1939. In 1940, Dora and her daughter were interned as enemy aliens at the Port Erin Women's Detention Camp on the Isle of Man, then released in 1941. In 1942, she returned to London, where she lectured and gave readings of Yiddish stories for Friends of Yiddish, working to keep the Jewish language and culture alive. She also "worked as a dress designer and opened a restaurant". In 1945, she "published her first theater review in Loshn un Leben. Over the next four years she wrote a half dozen articles and essays in the [Yiddish] journal." In 1949 she finally realized her lifelong dream and visited the new state of Israel. She died of kidney failure at Plaistow Hospital in east London on 15 August 1952 and was buried in an unmarked grave in the United Synagogue Cemetery on Marlowe Road in East Ham. In 1999, her relatives from Israel and Germany gathered at her gravesite for a stone setting, which reads "Who knows Dora, knows what love means".

Diamant is played by actress Henriette Confurius in the 2024 Kafka biographical film Die Herrlichkeit des Lebens (The Glory of Life).
