= Kurt Wolff =

Kurt Wolff may refer to:

- Kurt Wolff (publisher) (1887–1963), German publisher, editor, writer and journalist
- Kurt Wolff (aviator) (1895–1917), Germany World War I fighter ace
- Kurt Wolff (entrepreneur) (1907–1978), German entrepreneur
- Kurt Heinrich Wolff (1912–2003), Jewish German-born sociologist
