= Charlotte von Stein =

German playwright and close friend of Goethe and Schiller

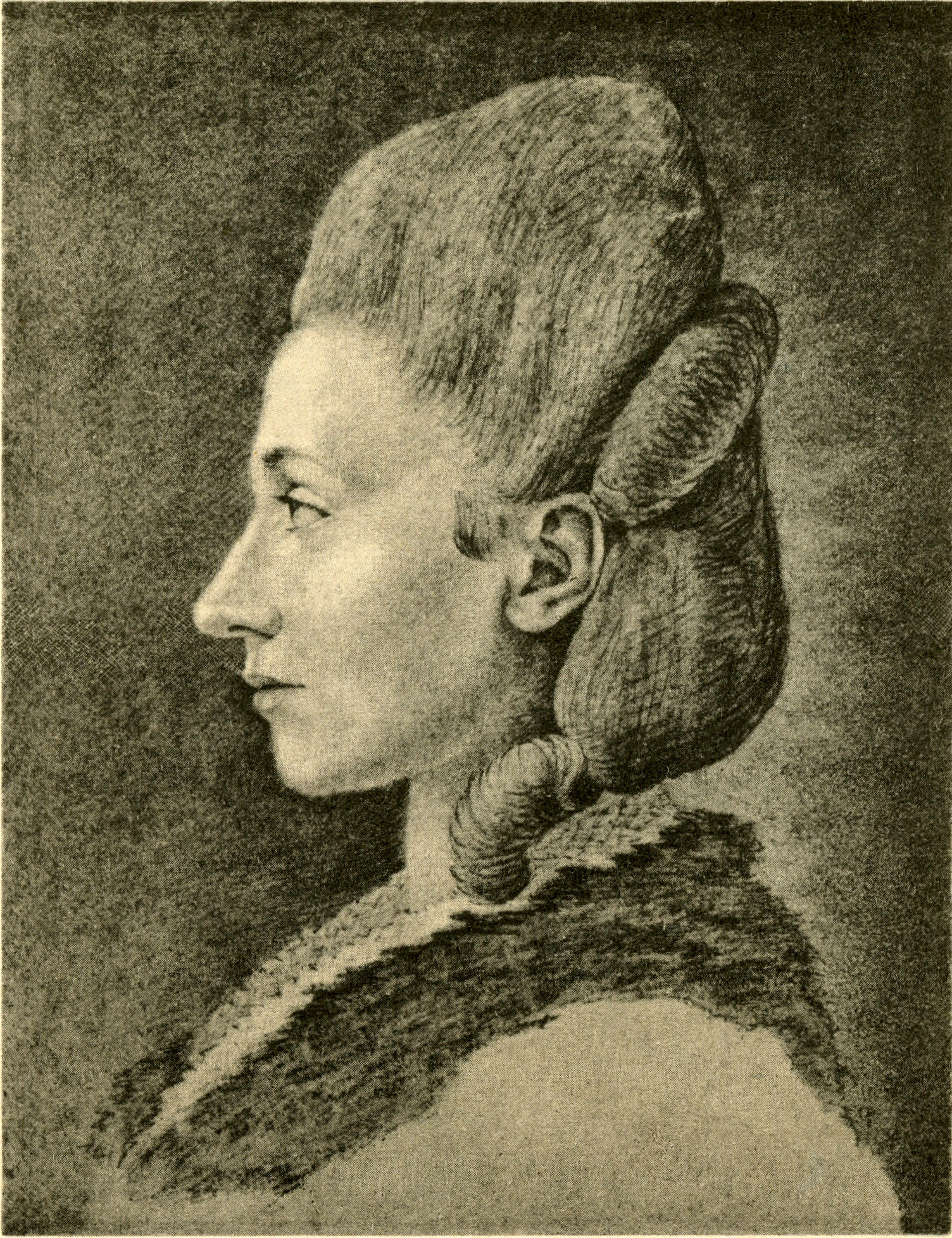
Portrait of Charlotte von Stein, painted by Goethe

Charlotte Albertine Ernestine von Stein (alternatively Charlotta Ernestina Bernadina von Stein; née von Schardt; 25 December 1742 – 6 January 1827) was a German lady-in-waiting at the court in Weimar and a close friend to both Friedrich Schiller and Johann Wolfgang von Goethe, whose work and life were influenced by her.

== Childhood ==
Von Stein was born on 25 December 1742, in Eisenach. Her parents moved to Weimar when von Stein was young and she was prepared for working as a lady-in-waiting. Her education included literature, art, singing and dancing. Von Stein was described as unobtrusive, witty, graceful and dutiful like her mother was. She had a weak constitution but was an avid writer.

== Profession and family ==
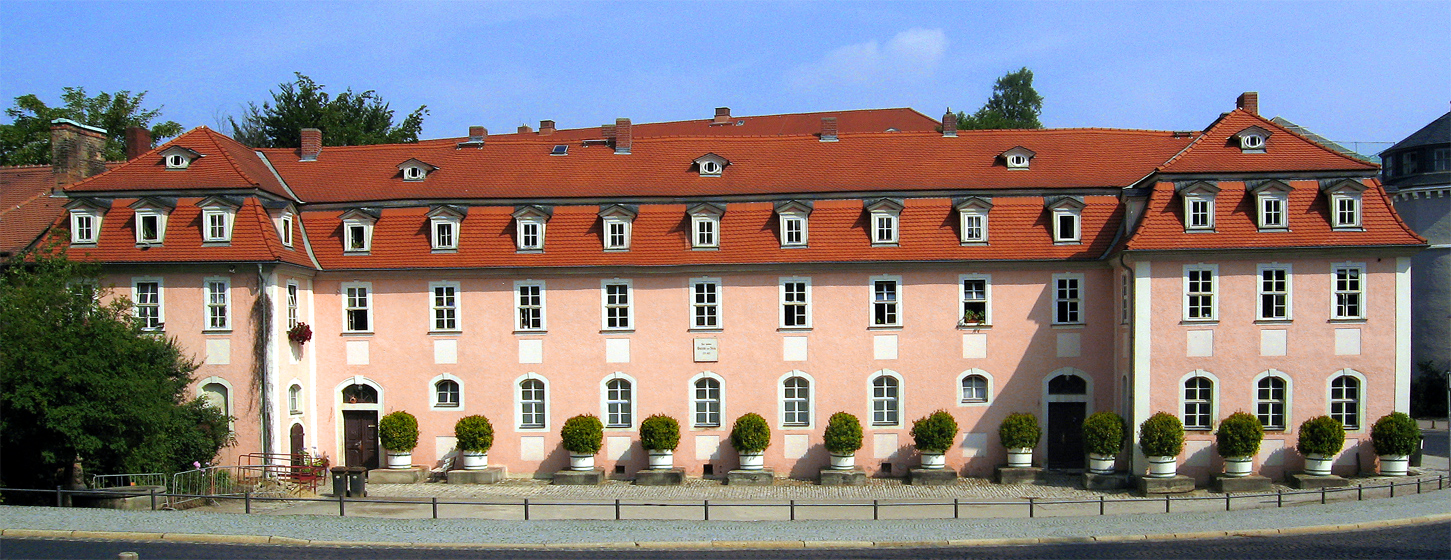
The palace of Charlotte von Stein in Weimar

In 1758 von Stein became a lady-in-waiting to Anna Amalia, Duchess of Saxe-Weimar-Eisenach, whom she served until the Duchess's death in 1807. On 17 May 1764 she married Baron Gottlob Ernst Josias Friedrich von Stein. It was not a marriage for love, but for social and political interests. Von Stein often remained alone in Weimar, as her husband travelled a great deal in the service of the Duke of Saxe-Weimar in Jena. From 1764 to 1773 she gave birth to seven children. Four daughters died; three boys, Karl, Ernst and Fritz, survived. After her seventh child was born, von Stein was physically exhausted, and took a succession of cures. She was also the aunt of Amalia von Helvig, who became a member of the Royal Swedish Academy of Music.

== Works ==
Von Stein wrote four plays, only one was published during her lifetime, Die zwey Emilien (The Two Emilies). The play was published anonymously, but with Schiller's name on the cover, which led many to believe that he was the author. Not until 1923 was Die zwey Emilien published under Charlotte von Stein's name. A second play, Die Probe (The Trial or The Rehearsal), may have been written by Charlotte von Stein. It was published in 1809 and has since disappeared. Charlotte von Stein wrote two more texts, both of which were untitled and have also been lost. The first was a story and the second another comedy.

- Rino (1776)
- Dido (1794)
- Neues Freiheitssystem oder die Verschwörungen gegen die Liebe (New System of Freedom or the Conspiracy Against Love) (1798)
- Die zwey Emilien (The Two Emilies) (1800)

== Charlotte and Goethe ==
In 1774 Johann Wolfgang von Goethe and von Stein met in Weimar. It was the beginning of a deep friendship which lasted for twelve years. During this time she had a strong influence on Goethe's work and life. Goethe took into his house her eleven-year-old son Fritz (her darling), in May 1783, and took over the boy's education to her satisfaction.

This period of her life might have been the happiest since she was in the center of social life and attention and met many famous personalities, e.g., Friedrich Schiller, Karl Ludwig Knebel, and Johann Georg Zimmermann. She frequently corresponded with Schiller's wife Charlotte.

== In the eyes of her contemporaries ==
Knebel has given an outstanding depiction of von Stein's nature:

Pure, correct feeling combined with a natural, passionless, light disposition have worked together with own diligence, furthered by the contact to excellent people that harmonized with her utterly fine thirst for knowledge, to form her into a personality whose nature and existence are hardly probable to come about, in Germany, very often again. She lacks any pretentiousness or affectation; she is straight, free in a natural way, not too heavy and not too light, without enthusiasm, and yet, with spiritual warmth, takes an interest in all reasonable and in all human, is well informed and possesses a fine delicacy, even aptitude for art.

— Karl Ludwig Knebel, letter to his sister Henriette, 18 April 1788

== Loneliness and death ==
In 1786 the deep friendship between Charlotte and Johann Wolfgang von Goethe ended with his sudden departure to Italy without telling her. Not until after 1800 did their relationship begin to normalize and even then it never became as close as before.

After her husband had died in 1793 Charlotte retired from society and became more and more lonely. In 1794 she wrote the drama Dido— a literary self-portrait that also depicted her disappointment about Goethe's behavior. It reflected the years from 1770 to 1790 and the situation in Weimar at that time. As depicted by Virgil, Dido (Queen of Carthage) was forsaken by her lover Aeneas who set off for Italy - an obvious parallel to von Stein herself and Goethe.

Von Stein died on 6 January 1827, in Weimar, at the age of 84.

== Legacy ==
The German poet Peter Hacks presented his play "Gespräch im Hause Stein über den abwesenden Herrn von Goethe" (A Discussion in the Stein Home about the Absent Mr. Goethe) in 1974. This monodrama became a worldwide success and is seen as a subtle analysis of the fate of Charlotte von Stein.
