= The Glory of Life (2024 film) =

2024 German-Austrian film by Judith Kaufmann and Georg Maas

- German theatrical release poster
- German: Die Herrlichkeit des Lebens
- Directed by: Judith Kaufmann; Georg Maas
- Written by: Georg Maas; Michael Guttmann
- Based on: The Glory of Life by Michael Kumpfmüller
- Produced by: Helge Sasse; Solveig Fina; Tommy Pridnig
- Starring: Henriette Confurius; Sabin Tambrea
- Cinematography: Judith Kaufmann
- Edited by: Gisela Zick
- Music by: Paul Eisenach; Jonas Hofer
- Production companies: Tempest Film; Lotus Film
- Distributed by: Majestic Film; TrustNordisk
- Release date: 14 March 2024 (Germany)
- Running time: 99 minutes
- Countries: Germany; Austria
- Language: German

The Glory of Life (German: Die Herrlichkeit des Lebens) is a 2024 drama film directed by Judith Kaufmann and Georg Maas from a script written by Maas, Michael Gutmann and Michael Kumpfmüller based on Kumpfmüller's 2011 novel of the same name. An international co-production between Austria and Germany, the film stars Sabin Tambrea and Henriette Confurius as Franz Kafka and Dora Diamant, respectively. It was released in Germany on 14 March 2024.

== Premise ==
In 1923, the last year of Franz Kafka's life, he meets Dora Diamant on the Baltic Sea coast and the two fall in love.

== Cast ==
- Henriette Confurius as Dora Diamant
- Sabin Tambrea as Franz Kafka
- Manuel Rubey as Max Brod
- Daniela Golpashin as Elli Hermann
- Alma Hasun as Ottla Kafka
- Peter Moltzen as Karl Hermann

== Production ==
Principal photography took place in Vienna, Berlin, and Mecklenburg-Vorpommern in 2023. TrustNordisk acquired international distribution rights to the film in June 2024.

== Accolades ==
The Glory of Life was nominated for 2024 German Film Award in Best Costume Design (German: Bestes Kostümbild) category.
