= Klaus Wagenbach =

German publisher and literary editor (1930–2021)

Klaus Wagenbach (11 July 1930 – 17 December 2021) was a German author and publisher who was the founder of the Klaus Wagenbach publishing house.

== Life and career ==
Wagenbach was born in Berlin, Brandenburg, Prussia, Germany, on 11 July 1930. In 1949 Wagenbach started an apprenticeship at the publishing house Suhrkamp/ Fischer (at this time one company). Wagenbach wrote his Ph.D. thesis about the work of Franz Kafka. When Fischer was sold to Holtzbrinck Publishing Group, the new bosses fired Wagenbach. Wagenbach had complained about the arrest of the GDR-publisher at Leipzig Book Fair.

As a result, he moved to West Berlin, West Germany, and founded his own publishing house in 1964 with Katharina, his then wife. When he founded his publishing house in West Berlin, it was supposed to be a German publishing house of authors of West Germany and East Germany. He published authors like Wolf Biermann, Günter Grass, Hans Werner Richter, Ingeborg Bachmann and others. He supported the poet Erich Fried and was friends with the Italian publisher Giangiacomo Feltrinelli.

At the end of 1969 Wagenbach initiated the experiment of collective and solidarity publishing work. This included that the publishing house was one of the first in the Federal Republic of Germany to receive a statute that clearly regulated the rights and obligations of all employees – including the owners. In its essential points, it provided for extensive co-determination of the publishing house members in all economic processes, the same salary for all employees and regular discussions of all important matters. In this publishing constitution, editing was expressly excluded from collectivization and was given an autonomous constitution. Manuscripts were edited by the company's three editors and only published with the consent of all three. In 1971, Wagenbach converted his publishing company into a GmbH with two shareholders, giving the collective half of his shares of the publishing house Verlag Klaus Wagenbach.

Wagenbach stood for a culture of interference and democratic dispute. He was considered the prototype of the political publisher of the 1968 movement. Wagenbach Verlag had several house searches, trials and convictions. Wagenbach saw himself as the most accused surviving German publisher. The lawyer at his side was Otto Schily, who later became the Red Army Faction lawyer and was later to become the German Federal Minister of the Interior.

Wagenbach also stood for lavishly made books; they should "last a hundred years", he said. Several books of Wagenbach where also published by the trade union book club Büchergilde Gutenberg. In 2002 Susanne Schüssler, Wagenbach's third wife, took over the publishing house. One of the greatest successes of Wagenbach Verlag in 2008 was the German edition of Alan Bennett's The Uncommon Reader, Die souveräne Leserin.

Wagenbach wrote three books on Franz Kafka, all of which have been translated into English.

He died on 17 December 2021, at the age of 91.

== Awards and honors ==
- 1979: Deutscher Kritikerpreis
- 1985: Premio Montecchio
- 1988: Cavaliere dell' Ordine al Merito della Repubblica Italiana
- 1990: Premio Nazionale per la Traduzione
- Verdienstorden der Bundesrepublik Deutschland
  - 1990 Verdienstkreuz Erster Klasse
  - 2001 Großes Verdienstkreuz
- 1994: Honorarprofessor für neuere deutsche Literatur an der Freien Universität Berlin
- 1999: Hugo-Ball-Preis
- 2001: Knight of the French Legion of Honour
- 2002: Kythera-Preis
- 2006: Honorary doctorate University of Urbino
- 2006: Ehrenpreis des österreichischen Buchhandels für Toleranz in Denken und Handeln
- 2006: Rahel-Varnhagen-von-Ense-Medaille
- 2010: Kurt Wolff Prize
- 2014: Enrico-Filippini-Preis
- 2017: Max-Herrmann Prize
- Honorary chairman of the Johannes Bobrowski Society
- Honorary member of the presidium of the Erich Fried Society
