= Rude Boy Records =

European independent record label

Rude Boy Records is a European independent record label focusing in underground hip hop and rap based in Germany.

== Company history ==
Rude Boy Records is a European independent record label focusing in underground hip hop and rap based in South Germany that was founded in the beginning of the 1990s as its own enterprise by Andric Stanelle Records. Also, Rude Boy Records is a production by Andric Stanelle Records and a publishing company with distributions by SPV GmbH. The independent hip hop record label is headed by chief executive officer and On the Mix Records employee Mike and Andric.

In the beginning of its company history, the label mainly dropped rap music inspired by Advanced Chemistrys Co-Founder DJ Mike MD. The founding label roster consisted of Colours United, Dee Smoove, Mike MD, Frank Riley & the Boyz, .... Today, Rude Boy Records productions is basing on the development and support of Underground Hip Hop, Rap and the love of it. For the professional realization, one label-owned studio in close proximity to

== Artists ==
=== Current roster ===
- DJ Mighty Mic - Rude Boy Records' chief executive officer, label-owner and producer. By the end of 2004 leading into 2005, he connected with DJ Reen and DJ Edward Sizzerhand of Square One and started working for Germany's Webzine No.1 in Underground Hip Hop and Rap HipHopNews.de Website. Since then, he's also an employee of Sizzerhand's tape label called On the Mix Records which is based in Munich, Germany.

=== Former Artists ===
- Colours United - Hip hop crew which consisted of Bronx (NYC) born Dee Smoove (rap, lyrics), DJ Mike MD (music, scratches) and the C.U. Posse. Together they fought against racism and were signed to Rude Boy Records.
- Dee Smoove - Manhattan (NYC) born emcee called Dee Smoove alias Damon Talton who was part of a hip hop group called Colours United. He also was signed to Rude Boy Records.
- DJ Mike MD - German DJ and producer who was signed to Rude Boy Records. Mike produced Tracks and Remixes for Chart Acts like Sqeezer, Bobby Womack, Gloria Gaynor, Carolina Escolano, The Southside Rockers and Royal Melody. He is performing with Jazzamore, an Electro Jazz Band since 2004.
- Vincent Wilkie & The Unexpected - Music band focusing in rap, rock and experimental sounds founded by Vincent Wilkie, who later became lotte ohm. Vincent Wilkie is now reborn as Instant Wilkie for reasons best known to himself. Apparently, he knows what it means, but he can't explain.

== Discography ==
=== Albums ===
- 1994 - Vincent Wilkie & The Unexpected - A Pocketful of Truth (Audio CD)
- 1995 - Colours United - You Talk 2 Much (Vinyl LP/ Audio CD)

=== Singles ===
- 1991 - Colours United - Legally Dope (Vinyl Maxi-Single, Maxi-CD)
- 1993 - Vincent Wilkie & The Unexpected - Waited Far Too Long (Maxi-CD)
- 1993 - Colours United - Stop The Racism (Vinyl Maxi-Single, Maxi-CD)
- 1995 - Frank Riley & The Boyz - Never Fall in Love Again (Maxi-CD)
- 1995 - Colours United - Smoove Is The Name (Vinyl Maxi-Single, Maxi-CD)

=== Mixtapes ===
- 1993 - Various - Kein Hass im wilden Süden 2 (Audio CD) (Intercord Records)
- 2005 - Various - Double Trouble Vol. 1 (HipHopNews.de Mixtape) (Audio CD) (On the Mix Records / Rude Boy Records)

== See also ==
- Advanced Chemistry
- List of record labels
