= Aleardi =

Aleardi is a surname. Notable people with the surname include:

- Aleardo Aleardi (1812–1878), Italian poet
- Pasquale Aleardi (born 1971), Swiss actor
