= Michelangelo Fortuzzi =

German actor (born 2001)

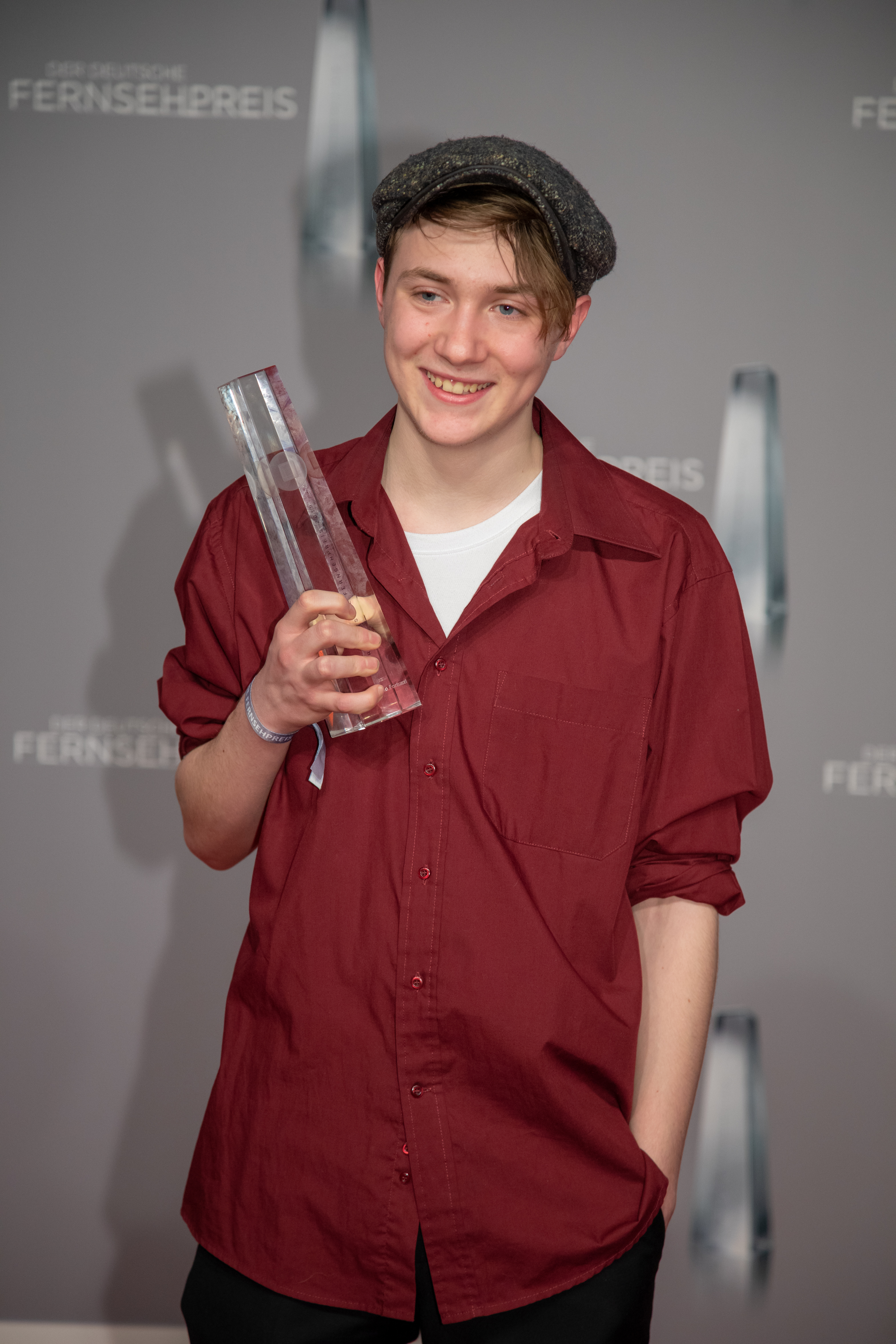
- Michelangelo Fortuzzi in 2019
- Born: 23 January 2001 (age 25); Erlangen, Germany
- Occupation: actor
- Years active: 2013–present

Michelangelo Fortuzzi (born 23 January 2001) is a German actor.

== Biography ==
Fortuzzi comes from a German-Italian theatrical family. The actor and director Alberto Fortuzzi is his father, and his older brother Valentino Fortuzzi is also an actor. He attended the Sophie-Scholl-Schule in Schöneberg. In 2019, Fortuzzi received the 2019 German Television Award for Young Talent for his performance in the multi-award-winning RBB drama Alles Isy (written and directed by Mark Monheim and Max Eipp). He played the film's main character, 16-year-old Jonas Vanderberg, who, after raping a classmate with two friends, is plagued by guilt and searches for a solution to his seemingly hopeless situation.

Fortuzzi also played the role of Matteo Florenzi, a man searching for his sexual orientation, in the web series Druck, the German adaptation of the Norwegian original SKAM. Fortuzzi starred in Druck alongside Milena Tscharntke and Lukas Alexander von Horbatschewsky.

In the 2021 Amazon Prime series "Wir Kinder vom Bahnhof Zoo" (We Children from Bahnhof Zoo), an eight-part adaptation of the book of the same name, he played the role of Benno.

Fortuzzi is a native speaker of German, Italian, and English. From 2020 to 2022, he studied acting at the Giles Foreman Centre for Acting in London.

== Filmography ==
=== Films ===
- 2013: Kopfüber
- 2014: Rico, Oskar und die Tieferschatten
- 2015: Inga Lindström: Familienbande (TV series)
- 2016: Ente gut! Mädchen allein zu Haus
- 2018: Alles Isy
- 2018: Einmal Sohn, immer Sohn
- 2019: Tatort: Leonessa (TV series)
- 2019: Berlin, I Love You
- 2019: Im Niemandsland
- 2020: Nackte Tiere
- 2021: Sörensen hat Angst
- 2023: Tatort: Die Kälte der Erde (TV series)
- 2024: Gotteskinder
- 2025: Tatort: Das Ende der Nacht (TV series)
- 2026: Sarah Kohr: Bis auf den Grund (TV series)

=== TV series ===
- 2013: Pinocchio
- 2018–2019: Druck
- 2019: Notruf Hafenkante (Episode My name is Maja)
- 2019: Preis der Freiheit (TV three-parter)
- 2020: Mapa (Episode 1x01)
- Since 2021: Wir Kinder vom Bahnhof Zoo
- 2023: Watch Me
