= Verrückt nach Clara =

- Starring: Julia-Maria Köhler, Sascha Göpel, Pasquale Aleardi
- Music by: Oren Lavie – "Her Morning Elegance"
- Country of origin: Germany
- No. of seasons: 1
- No. of episodes: 8

Production
- Producers: Nico Hofmann, Ariane Krampe
- Running time: 45 minutes

Original release
- Network: ProSieben
- Release: 11 January 2007

Verrückt nach Clara (Crazy About Clara) is a 2007 German television series, which was produced by TeamWorx and Film GmbH in Berlin, on behalf of the television station ProSieben. A dramedy, it is an eight-part adaptation of the French series Clara Sheller, which had already been produced and broadcast in France and Italy.

== Plot ==
29-year-old Clara (Julia-Maria Köhler), who lives in a Berlin apartment together with her good, gay friend Paul (Sascha Göpel), feels lonely and tries by hook or crook to find a suitable man for herself. But this happens with obstacles. After a night with her gay boyfriend she finds out that she is pregnant by him. The reason why her boss at the tabloid newspaper where she works is not considered the father is that he cannot father children. Meanwhile, Paul meets his first great love, who even moves in with him and Clara. But the great love for Paul is not mutual and he separates from him. Meanwhile Clara is tormented by the thought of how and if she should tell him that she is pregnant by him. When she does tell him and he gradually decides to have the child, Clara loses the child.

== Cast ==
- Julia-Maria Köhler as Clara Stern
- Sascha Göpel as Paul
- Pasquale Aleardi as Simon
- Cordelia Wege as Marie
- Huub Stapel as Bernd
- Sebastian Ströbel as Fotograf Patrick
- Florian Jahr as Nick
- Charlotte Schwab as Daniela Stern
- Lotte Ohm as Eva
- Nina Liu as Miu

== Production and broadcasting ==
The eight episodes of the first and last season were already shot in 2006, but the start of the series was postponed several times. ProSieben showed the first two episodes on January 11 and 18, 2007 at 8:15 p.m., but postponed the series' broadcast from January 25 to 10:15 p.m., after the ratings for the second episode had already fallen below the 1 million mark. Even in the new time slot, the production only achieved an average market share of 5.4 percent in the advertising-relevant target group, which is why the station felt compelled to wait until after midnight to broadcast the last two episodes. The last episode was watched by 210,000 viewers, giving it a market share of 5.4 percent. On average, Verrückt nach Clara reached a market share of 3.8 percent.

== See also ==
- List of German television series
