= Sira-Anna Faal =

Gambian actress (born 2000)

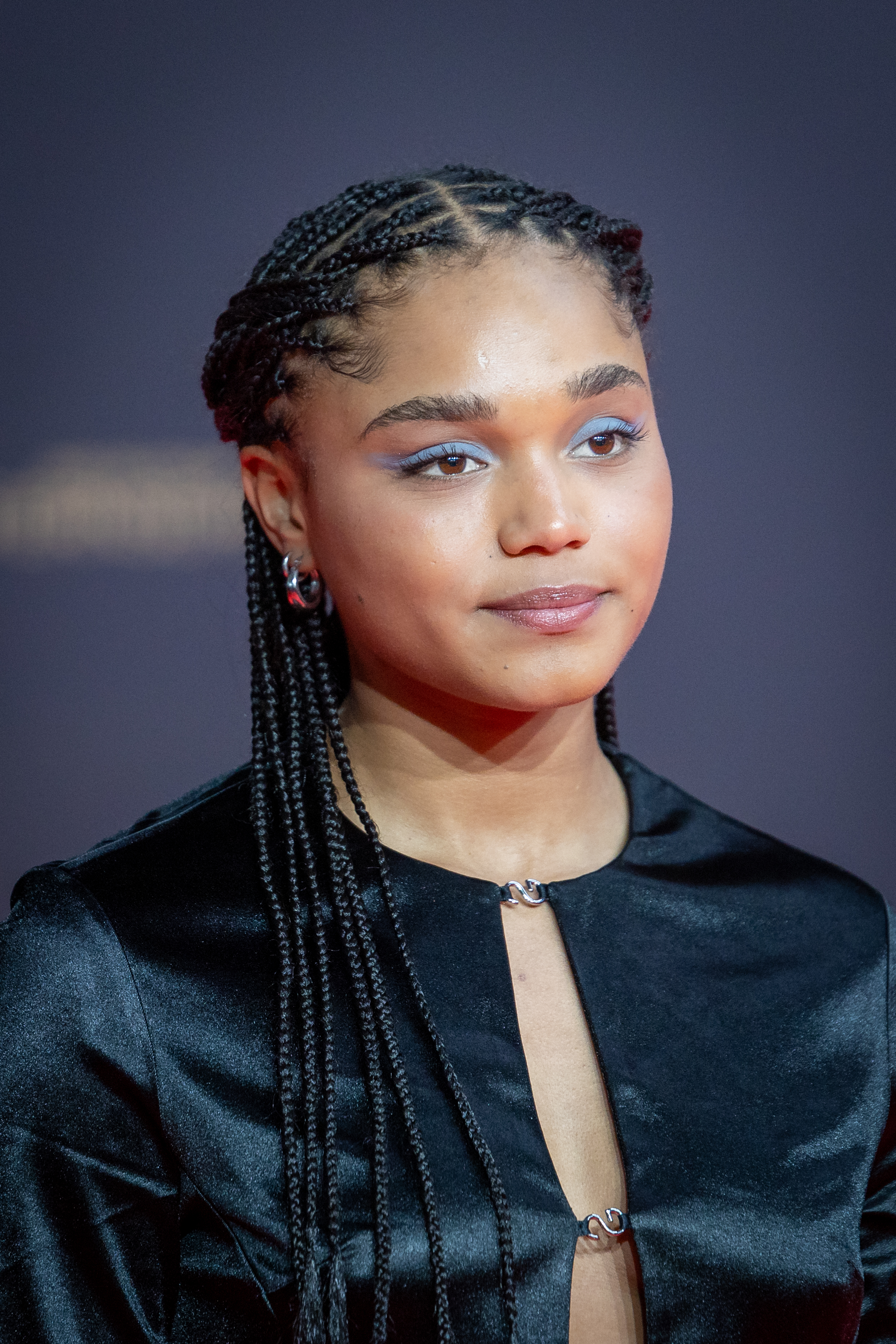
- Sira-Anna Faal in 2024
- Born: 2000 (age 25–26)
- Other names: Sira Faal, Sira
- Occupations: actress, singer, rapper

Sira-Anna Faal (born 2000), also known as Sira Faal and by her stage name Sira, is a German-Gambian actress, singer and rapper.

== Career ==
=== Acting ===
Faal made her acting debut in 2020 in the fifth season of the web and television series Druck. In the series, she plays Fatou Jallow, who becomes a main character in the sixth season. For this role, she received an ensemble award at the 2021 German Acting Awards. In 2023, her first feature film, The Ordinaries, was released. A year earlier, Faal had been nominated for a New German Cinema Award in the acting category for her work.

=== Music ===
She first appeared musically under her stage name Sira in 2020 as a guest on California's album Penso . In July 2021, she collaborated with Gate21 on the single Augen rot . Her first solo single, Koma, released that same year, was chosen as the recommendation of the day by the online music magazine Diffus. In 2022, Sira released her debut EP, Noema , in collaboration with music producer KazOnDaBeat, who had also produced her debut single. Also featured in Diffus was the 2022 single Miete by rapper Xaver and KazOnDaBeat featuring Sira in the UK-Garage style, the 2022 single Lonely in the Hyperpop style, the 2023 single Winterherz in the boom bap style, and the 2023 single Klar, released in the same year with actor and rapper Dead Dawg, again in the hyperpop style. Sira's second EP, HyperAktiv, was released in 2023, exclusively via KazOnDaBeat's SoundCloud account. On 18 January 2024 , she released the single Phase together with Xaver and Gustav from 01099.

== Filmography ==
- 2020–2022: Druck (web and television series)
- 2021: Die Carolin Kebekus Show (TV show)
- 2022: Becoming Charlie (TV show)
- 2023: Berlin Nobody
- 2023: Like a Loser (TV show)
- 2023: SOKO Leipzig (TV show)
- 2023: The Ordinaries
- 2024: Die feige Schönheit
- 2024: Pauline (TV show)
- 2025: Ungeduld des Herzens
- 2025: Die drei ??? und der Karpatenhund
- 2025: Brick
- 2025: Euphorie (TV show)
- 2025: Kroymann (satire show, Road to reality)
- 2026: Havelland-Krimi

== Discography ==
EPs

- 2022: Noema (with KazOnDaBeat)
- 2023: HyperAktiv (with KazOnDaBeat)

Singles

- 2021: Augen rot (as part of Gate21)
- 2021: too much (jun feat. Sira & Noé)
- 2021: Koma
- 2022: Passos (with Carlifornia & Ish)
- 2022: Miete (Xaver & KazOnDaBeat feat. Sira)
- 2022: Lonely
- 2023: Winterherz
- 2023: Klar (with Dead Dawg)
- 2024: Phase (with Xaver & Gustav)
- 2024: Pauline

== Awards ==
- 2021: Ensemble Prize of the German Acting Prize for Druck
