= The Ordinaries =

- Theatrical release poster
- Directed by: Sophie Linnenbaum
- Written by: Sophie Linnenbaum; Michael Fetter Nathansky
- Produced by: Laura Klippel; Britta Strampe
- Starring: Fine Sendel
- Cinematography: Valentin Selmke
- Edited by: Kai Eiermann
- Music by: Fabian Zeidler
- Production companies: Bandenfilm; Das kleine Fernsehspiel; Filmuniversität Babelsberg Konrad Wolf
- Distributed by: Notsold; Port au Prince Pictures
- Release dates: 27 June 2022 (München); 30 March 2023 (Germany)
- Running time: 124 minutes
- Country: Germany
- Language: German

The Ordinaries is a 2022 German science fiction tragicomedy film directed by Sophie Linnenbaum (in her directorial debut) who co-wrote with Michael Fetter Nathansky. It stars Fine Sendel. It is about Paula, a supporting character who wants to be a lead like her dead father, but inconsistencies surrounding his death will make her question her world.

The Ordinaries had its international premiere at the 56th Karlovy Vary International Film Festival on July 3, 2022, where it competed for the Crystal Globe.

== Synopsis ==
In a repressive three class-society, Paula, a simple supporting character, is about to face the most important test of her life: she has to prove she deserves to be a lead. She is at the top of her class at the Main Character School – but so far has failed in generating great emotional music. In search of a solution, she finds herself in the abyss of the cinematic world, on the fringes of the storyline and lost amongst the Outtakes.

== Cast ==
The actors participating in this film are:

- Fine Sendel as Paula Feinmann
- Jule Böwe as Elisa Feinmann
- Henning Peker as Maid Hilde
- Noah Tinwa as Simon
- Michael Pink as Henry F. Dotter
- Sira-Anna Faal as Hannah Cooper
- Denise M'Baye as Frau Dr. Cooper
- Pasquale Aleardi as Herr Cooper
- Noah Bailey as Elio Cooper
- Benita Sarah Bailey as Police woman
- Paul Michael Stiehler as Leon
- Christian Steyer as Feinmann
- Birgit Berthold as Clara

== Release ==
=== Festivals ===
The Ordinaries had its world premiere on June 27, 2022, at the Munich International Film Festival, then screened on July 3, 2022, at the 56th Karlovy Vary International Film Festival, where it competed for the Crystal Globe, on August 25, 2022, at the Fünf Seen Filmfestival, at the end of September 2022 at the 18th Zurich Film Festival, on November 12, 2022, at the 26th Tallinn Black Nights Film Festival, on January 30, 2023, at the 46th Göteborg Film Festival, on March 10, 2023, at the South by Southwest Film Festival and on March 24, 2023, at the 27th Berlin & Beyond Film Festival.

=== Theatrical ===
It was released commercially on March 30, 2023, in German theaters to later expand to the Australian market on July 6, 2023.

== Reception ==
=== Critical reception ===
Jonathan Romney from Screen Daily highlights the narrative capacity of the production, calling it twisted and ingenious, although it can become complicated for the viewer due to the complexity of the themes. Also, praises the production design, sound design, and cinematography reminiscent of East Germany. Ricardo Gallegos from La Estatuilla concludes that it is a fascinating and fun film, as well as being creative in building and shaping the foundations of the parallel cinematographic world that the director and her co-writer wrote despite the fact that the basic idea is simple and not very innovative.

=== Accolades ===
Year	Award / Festival	Category	Recipient	Result	Ref.
2022	Munich International Film Festival	German Cinema New Talent Award - Best Director	Sophie Linnenbaum	Won	
2022	Munich International Film Festival	German Cinema New Talent Award - Best Producer	Britta Strampe & Laura Klippel	Won	
2022	Munich International Film Festival	German Cinema New Talent Award - Best Screenplay	Sophie Linnenbaum & Michael Fetter Nathansky	Nominated	
2022	Karlovy Vary International Film Festival	Crystal Globe	The Ordinaries	Nominated	
2022	New Faces Award	Best Debut Film	Sophie Linnenbaum	Won	
2022	Zurich Film Festival	Focus Competition - Best Film	The Ordinaries	Nominated	
2022	International Film Festival for Children and Young Audience SCHLiNGEL	Children's and Youth Film Award of the Goethe-Institut	The Ordinaries	Won	
2022	Exground Filmfest	Audience Award	The Ordinaries	Won	
2022	Filmkunstfest MV	Förderpreis der DEFA-Stiftung - Jury Prize	The Ordinaries	Won	
2023	Minneapolis St. Paul International Film Festival	Emerging Filmmaker Award	Sophie Linnenbaum	Nominated	
2023	Minneapolis St. Paul International Film Festival	Special Jury Prize	Sophie Linnenbaum	Won	
2023	German Film Award	Best Costume Design	Josefine Lindner & Max-Josef Schönborn	Nominated	
2023	German Film Award	Best Visual Effects	Johannes Blech	Nominated	
2023	Glasgow Film Festival	Audience Award	The Ordinaries	Nominated	
2023	Cinedays Festival of European Film	Golden Star	The Ordinaries	Won	
2023	Cinedays Festival of European Film	Best Screenplay	Sophie Linnenbaum & Michael Fetter Nathansky	Won	
