= Just Something Nice =

- Theatrical release poster
- Directed by: Karoline Herfurth
- Written by: Monika Fässler; Tim Hebborn; Karoline Herfurth
- Produced by: Lothar Hellinger; Christopher Doll
- Starring: Karoline Herfurth; Nora Tschirner; Milena Tscharntke
- Cinematography: Daniel Gottschalk
- Edited by: Linda Bosch
- Music by: Annette Focks
- Production companies: Hellinger / Doll Filmproduktion; Warner Bros. Film Productions Germany
- Distributed by: Warner Bros. Pictures
- Release date: 17 November 2022
- Running time: 116 minutes
- Country: Germany
- Language: German
- Box office: $5.7 million

Just Something Nice (German: Einfach mal was Schönes) is a 2022 German romantic comedy film directed by directed by and starring Karoline Herfurth.

The film was released in Germany on 17 November 2022 by Warner Bros. Pictures.

== Plot ==
Radio host Karla has tried for a long time, but she simply cannot find the right person with whom to start a family. She decides to have a child on her own. Then she meets Ole, a nurse; he is the dream man she has been looking for all along but Ole doesn't want to have children yet.

== Cast ==
- Karoline Herfurth as Karla
- Nora Tschirner as Jule
- Milena Tscharntke as Johanna
- Jasmin Shakeri as Senay
- Ulrike Kriener as Marion
- Herbert Knaup as Robert
- Kathrin Angerer as Sandy
- Aaron Altaras as Ole
- Inga Dietrich as Nachbarin Jutta
- Raphael Rubino as Simon
