= Zethphan Smith-Gneist =

German actor (born 2001)

- Born: 2001 (age 24–25); New York City, New York, U.S.
- Occupation: Actor
- Notable work: Druck; Tár
- Height: 186 cm (6 ft 1 in)

Zethphan Smith-Gneist (born 2001) is a German actor, best known for his main role as Josh Zimmermann in Druck, the German adaptation of Skam, and as Max, a Juilliard student in the 2022 psychological drama, Tár, written and directed by Todd Field and starring Cate Blanchett.

== Early life ==
Smith-Gneist was born in New York City. After his parents separated, his mother, actress Aímee Gneist, raised him in Berlin. Because of his mother's profession, he grew up fond of film, citing Léon: The Professional and Inglourious Basterds as two of his favorites. He can play piano, saxophone, drums, and guitar. He also enjoys playing table tennis, basketball, football, and volleyball, and is skilled in parkour.

== Career ==
In September 2020, Smith-Gneist rose to fame after being cast as Josh Zimmermann in the ZDF and funk series, Druck, an adaptation of the popular Norwegian teen drama series, Skam. This was one of Smith-Gneist's first acting roles ever, as he only decided to focus on acting as a result of the COVID-19 pandemic. The project reunited him with his Lucie - geheult wird nicht co-star, Mina-Giselle Rüffer, where they again played love interests. Season five was the first original season produced by the German adaptation, surpassing the four original Skam storylines, focusing on Rüffer's character of Nora, who is struggling with dissociative disorder while balancing new friendships and a new love interest in Josh. The season incorporated Smith-Gneist's interest in parkour. Druck and Rüffer were nominated for the Grimme-Preis 2020, in the Kids and Teens category, and for her portrayal of Nora in season five, which she won. Druck also won the Deutscher Schauspielpreis in 2021 for outstanding casting of the ensemble cast for seasons five and six.

Smith-Gneist continued to appear on the show in a recurring role as Josh through seasons six to eight, which brought the "second generation" of Druck to a close.

He appeared in other television series in recurring or guest roles throughout 2021 and 2022, including Netflix's Kleo as Mark Petzold, Notruf Hafenkante as Samir Madu, and WaPo Berlin as Yusuf Cevikus.

Smith-Gneist's next big role came in Todd Field's 2022 film, Tár, where he played Max, a Juilliard student who gets into a heated debate with Cate Blanchett's character, marking a pivotal moment in the film. This also marked his English-language debut. For his role, he was interviewed by The Hollywood Reporter, which discussed his audition, acting background, and details on how he prepared for his scene opposite Blanchett. Tár went on to receive critical acclaim, and was named the best film of 2022 by more critics than any other film that year. At the 95th Academy Awards, Tár was nominated for six awards, including Best Picture, and Best Director.

In 2023, Smith-Gneist has gone on to appear in movies Sprich mit mir as Viktor, and Mein Vater, der Esel und ich as Florian Zeller. As of 2023, an upcoming project was the television show Zeit Verbrechen - X-Box Lounge, set to be released on Paramount+.

== Filmography ==
=== Television ===
Year	Title	Character	Notes
2020	Lucie - geheult wird nicht	Maxim	Guest cast; one episode
2020–2022	Druck	Josh Zimmermann	Main cast (season 5), recurring cast (season 6–8); 18 episodes
2021	Notruf Hafenkante	Samir Madu	Guest cast; 1 episode
2022	WaPo Berlin	Yusuf Cevikus	Guest cast; 1 episode
2022	Kleo	Mark Petzold	Recurring cast; 3 episodes
2023	Zeit Verbrechen - X-Box Lounge	TBA	

=== Film ===
Year	Title	Character	Notes
2021	Nachtfalter		Short film
2022	Tár	Max	English-language debut
2023	Sprich mit mir	Viktor	
2023	Mein Vater, der Esel und ich	Florian Zeller	German TV movie

== Discography ==
=== Music ===
Year	Title	Notes
2022	Tár	Soundtrack; featured on "Ró"
