= Druck (TV series) =

German television series

- Genre: Teen drama
- Based on: Skam by Julie Andem
- Starring: Lilly Dreesen; Milena Tscharntke; Michelangelo Fortuzzi; Tua El-Fawwal; Mina-Giselle Rüffer; Sira-Anna Faal; Eren M. Güvercin; Frida Stittrich
- Country of origin: Germany
- Original language: German
- No. of seasons: 8
- No. of episodes: 80

Production
- Executive producers: Lasse Scharpen; Jan Kromschröder
- Producers: Eva Kaesgen; Edgar Derzian; Nikolaas Meinshausen; Julia Zechiel; Felix Schwegler
- Production location: Berlin
- Running time: 11–40 minutes
- Production company: Bantry Bay Productions

Original release
- Network: ZDF; Funk
- Release: March 19, 2018 – July 1, 2022

Druck (English: Pressure) is a German teen drama streaming television series, based on the Norwegian TV series Skam, created by Julie Andem. It premiered with its first full episode on March 23, 2018 on Funk and YouTube.

Employing the same distribution method and overall storylines as the original Norwegian production, Druck is shown in real-time through short clips on a nearly daily basis on YouTube, supplemented with screenshots of messages between the characters over WhatsApp or Telegram and compiled clips into full episodes on Friday. Real social media accounts created for the fictional characters on Instagram allow viewers greater insight into the show beyond its clips. The first of these short clips was released on March 19, 2018. On December 24, 2019 a fifth season was announced to premier summer 2020. On April 12, 2020 it was announced, that season 5 will focus on Nora Machwitz, while also introducing a new generation. On August 10, 2020 a teaser was released, announcing that season 5 would start on September 20, 2020. On September 1, 2020, Lukas von Horbatschewsky announced that a sixth season is in pre-production. On December 13, 2020, the first clip of season 6 dropped and revealed the new main, Fatou Jallow. On August 18, 2021, Druck released a teaser on instagram announcing season 7 to premier in autumn 2021. On August 31, 2021, Druck revealed on Telegram that this season would center around Isi Inci. On September 26, 2021, it was announced that the new season will start on October 24, 2021 with its first clip. On January 13, 2022, the official Instagram of the show revealed that the eighth season would begin airing in Spring 2022. On February 17, the Druck Instagram account revealed that the season would feature Mailin as its lead and on March 28, it was revealed that the season would start on April 24, 2022.

The show was nominated for the 55. Grimme-Preis 2019 and the 56. Grimme-Preis 2020, both times in the category Kids & Teens.

== Premise and plot ==
Druck follows a group of friends in their teen life in Berlin and deals with daily and current events, like friendship, love and the search for their own identity. Every season centers on a new character.

The first season centers on Hanna and started with the first clip on March 19, 2018. After having "stolen" her best friend's boyfriend, Hanna suddenly loses all her friends and her former crew ostracizes and nags her. Her relationship with her boyfriend Jonas suffers from this. Hanna finally finds a new group of friends who help her get a grip on her life.

The second season centers on Mia, a close friend of Hanna. Mia is a feminist and dislikes the arrogant Alexander Hardenberg, who exerts a bad influence on her friend Kiki. After Mia asks Alex to end his relationship with Kiki, she gets to know another side of Alex and slowly develops feelings for him, which in turn threatens her friendship with Kiki. The first clip for the second season was released on December 17, 2018.

The third season centers on Matteo and his relationships, both with the boys and girls in the group. While the upperclassman prepare for their final exams and graduation, Matteo struggles with the pressure from his friends to be intimate with the girl he is dating while hiding that he is actually gay. He is also grappling with mental health and family dynamics that create an increasing reliance on substances to cope with them. While he stresses about school and girls, he experiences the rise and fall of his developing romance with the mysterious new boy in school, who has his own secret. The first clip of season three was released on March 9, 2019.

The fourth season centers on Amira and the expectations put upon her by faith, family, and friends. While she prepares to find independence abroad she also wants to be true to her beliefs and to herself. There is a lot of pressure on her from the communities she belongs to, which her younger brother is also experiencing. While she helps those around her with their own difficulties, she finds a conflict between her commitment to her religion and the feelings that grow between her and Mohammed, who is not Muslim. She begins to isolate herself from the other girls, and must find a balance between all the parts of her life. The first clip of season four was released on June 8, 2019.

The fifth season centers on Nora, one of Kiki's two sisters. After breaking up with Constantin, all her former friends reject her. Her mom is an alcoholic and she has to face everything on her own, as Kiki moves to another city with Carlos, and Zoe, her other sister, avoids staying home with their mother as much as possible. She finds some new friends and a new love interest while she deals with her own mental health. COVID-19 is also one of the themes of this season. The first clip of season five was released on September 20, 2020.

The sixth season centers on Fatou, member of Nora's new group of friends. The first clip of season six was released on December 13, 2020. Fatou starts a relationship with her crush Kieu My, while facing problems at school. She discovers she has dyscalculia and because of bad marks, she might not be able to graduate. Meanwhile, her friends' group is collapsing due to some arguments. For example, Ava and Mailin fight over the theme of social justice. Although only some COVID-19 restrictions are shown on screen, the season was filmed before the new lockdown, therefore it does not reflect the real German Coronavirus situation between December and February.

The seventh season centers on Isi. The first clip of season seven was released on October 24, 2021. Having grown distant from their former clique, Ismail rekindles their friendship with childhood friend Sascha and befriends newcomer to school Lou, which will bring them closer to Constantin once more, as he also appears to be interested in Lou. The series also explores how Isi handles their non-binary identity with their loving yet absent parents and brother Umut, who is reacting increasingly negatively to his sibling’s androgynous expression.

The eighth season centers on Mailin. The first clip of the season was released on April 24, 2022.

== Characters ==
The following are characters in Druck, and their counterparts from the original Norwegian series:

=== Central characters ===
Actor	Character	Based on	Instagram	First Generation				Second Generation			
Actor	Character	Based on	Instagram	1	2	3	4	5	6	7	8
Lilly Charlotte Dreesen	Hanna Jung	Eva Kviig Mohn	ha.nnanananana	Central	Main	Recurring	Main				
Milena Tscharntke	Mia Amalie Winter	Noora Amalie Sætre	mia_hollycaulfield	Main	Central	Recurring	Main				
Michelangelo Fortuzzi	Matteo Florenzi	Isak Valtersen	matteohno	Main	Recurring	Central	Recurring				
Tua El-Fawwal	Amira Thalia Mahmood	Sana Bakkoush	amira.da.queen	Main	Main	Main	Central				
Mina-Giselle Rüffer	Nora Machwitz		norangensaft					Central	Main	Recurring	Main
Sira-Anna Faal	Fatou Jallow		chibifatou					Main	Central	Recurring	Main
Eren M. Güvercin	Isi Inci		isi.downtoearth					Recurring	Recurring	Central	Recurring
Frida Stittrich	Mailin Richter		__mai_lin__					Main	Main	Recurring	Central

=== Main characters ===
Actor	Character	Based on	Instagram	First Generation				Second Generation			
Actor	Character	Based on	Instagram	1	2	3	4	5	6	7	8
Leanora Zoë Voss	Kiki Machwitz	Vilde Hellerud Lien	kikirekiii	Main	Main	Recurring	Main	Recurring			
Jobel Mokonzi	Sam M'Pele	Christina "Chris" Berg	sampagner	Main	Main	Recurring	Recurring				
Anselm Bresgott	Jonas Augustin	Jonas Noah Vasquez	jon_astronaut	Main	Main	Main	Recurring				
Chris Veres	Alexander Hardenberg	William Magnusson	alex.hardenberg	Recurring	Main	Guest	Recurring				
Louis Daniel	Carlos Schmidt	Magnus Fossbakken	car_lospolloshermanos	Guest	Recurring	Main		style="background: #FFE3E3; color:black; vertical-align: middle; text-align: center; " class="table-cast"| Recurring			data-sort-value="" style="background: var(--background-color-interactive, #ececec); color: var(--color-base, inherit); vertical-align: middle; text-align: center; " class="table-na" |
Louis Daniel	Carlos Schmidt	Elias	car_lospolloshermanos	Guest	Recurring	Main		style="background: #FFE3E3; color:black; vertical-align: middle; text-align: center; " class="table-cast"| Recurring			data-sort-value="" style="background: var(--background-color-interactive, #ececec); color: var(--color-base, inherit); vertical-align: middle; text-align: center; " class="table-na" |
Arda Göerkem	Abdi Ates	Mahdi Disi	kebab.di	Guest	Guest	Main	Recurring				
Florian Appelius	Hans Brecht	Eskild Tryggvasson	super.sch_hans		Main	Main	Guest				
Lukas von Horbatschewsky	David Schreibner	Even Bech Næsheim	da_vid.gif		Guest	Main	Recurring			Guest	
Hassan Kello	Mohammed Razzouk	Yousef Acar	mo_zouk				Main				
Madeleine Wagenitz	Zoe Machwitz		zoe.keinwitz				Guest	Main	Recurring	Main	Recurring
Aicha Lopes	Ava Celeste Pereira		its.your_girl_ava					Main	Main	Recurring	Main
Zethphan Smith-Gneist	Josh Zimmermann		dieser_josh					Main	Guest	Recurring	Recurring
Nhung Hong	Kieu My Vu		q.meeee					Recurring	Main	Main	Recurring
Quang Anh Le	Finn Nguyen		nguyen.finn					Recurring	Recurring	Main	Main
Casper von Bülow	Constantin Ostendorf		consti.ost					Recurring	Recurring	Main	Recurring
Paul Ahrens	Sascha Belin		holzwurm138							Main	Recurring
Paula Goos	Louise "Lou" Schäfer		currywurst_und_aut0s							Main	Recurring

=== Recurring and guest characters ===
Actor	Character	Based on	Instagram	First Generation				Second Generation			
Actor	Character	Based on	Instagram	1	2	3	4	5	6	7	8
Luise Emilie Tschersich	Sara Adamczyk	Sara Nørstelien	sara.czyk	Guest		style="background: #FFE3E3; color:black; vertical-align: middle; text-align: center; " class="table-cast"| Recurring		Guest		data-sort-value="" style="background: var(--background-color-interactive, #ececec); color: var(--color-base, inherit); vertical-align: middle; text-align: center; " class="table-na" |	
Luise Emilie Tschersich	Sara Adamczyk	Emma W. Larzen	sara.czyk	Guest		style="background: #FFE3E3; color:black; vertical-align: middle; text-align: center; " class="table-cast"| Recurring		Guest		data-sort-value="" style="background: var(--background-color-interactive, #ececec); color: var(--color-base, inherit); vertical-align: middle; text-align: center; " class="table-na" |	
Juliane Schütze	Leonie Richter	Ingrid Theis Gaupseth	leonie.rchtr	Recurring	Guest	Recurring	Guest		data-sort-value="" style="background: var(--background-color-interactive, #ececec); color: var(--color-base, inherit); vertical-align: middle; text-align: center; " class="table-na" |		
Juliane Schütze	Leonie Richter	Sonja	leonie.rchtr	Recurring	Guest	Recurring	Guest		data-sort-value="" style="background: var(--background-color-interactive, #ececec); color: var(--color-base, inherit); vertical-align: middle; text-align: center; " class="table-na" |		
Pablo Grant	Samuel Fischer	Christoffer Schistad	sam_el.fischer	Recurring	Guest						
Ada Philine Stappenbeck	Linn Shira	Linn Larsen Hansen	linn.sensuppe		Recurring	Recurring					
Malte Thomsen	Björn Quisling	Nikolai Magnusson	bjoern.quisling		Recurring						
Naomi Achternbusch	Laura Schreibner	Sonja				Recurring					
Samy Abdel Fattah	Omar Mahmood	Elias Bakkoush	phara_omar				Recurring				
Hussein Eliraqui	Essam Mahmood	Elias Bakkoush	er.sie.essam				Recurring				
Rana Farahani	Nadia Mansour	Jamilla Bikarim	nad.ya.amar				Recurring				
Carl Bagnar	Stefan Wiese						Recurring				
Tijan Marei	Victoria						Recurring				
Elena Ployphailin Siepe	Yara Aimsakul		yara.cita					Recurring	Guest	Recurring	Recurring
Adama Cefalu	Ilai Jallow								Recurring		
Mety Kalan	Umut Inci									Recurring	
Christoph Moreno	Ben										Recurring

=== Central cast ===
==== First Generation ====
- Lilly Charlotte Dreesen as Hanna Jung (born 2001), the central character of the first season. When the series begins, Hanna is dating Jonas, who also used to date Leonie, Hanna's former best friend. Because of this, Hanna has lost her friend group, and is almost completely dependent on Jonas, who she struggles to trust. As the first season continues, she finds a new group of friends in Mia, Amira, Kiki, and Sam, and decides to break up with Jonas to focus on herself for a while. She dates Stefan in the fourth season, but later breaks up with him as she still has unresolved feelings for Jonas.
- Milena Tscharntke as Mia Winter (born October 3, 2000), the protagonist of the second season. Hanna's new best friend, and a recent transplant to Berlin from Spain. She is passionate about social justice and feminist causes. Mia struggles with her relationship with her parents, who still live in Spain, and remain indifferent to their daughter's life and interests. While in Berlin, Mia lives with roommates Hans, Linn, and Matteo. Throughout the series, Mia has a turbulent romantic relationship with Alexander Hardenberg, a popular boy who also had a relationship with her friend, Kiki. They break up for good in the fourth season, and Mia begins to pursue Victoria.
- Michelangelo Fortuzzi as Matteo Florenzi (born 2001), the central character of season 3. Matteo is Jonas' best friend, and struggles with depression. His mother also struggles with mental illness, and as a result, he moves in with Mia, Hans and Linn when the third season begins. Matteo also struggles with being gay, something that becomes more complicated by his growing feelings for David, a transgender boy and a new student at school. With the support and love of his roommates and his friends, Matteo comes out publicly and becomes a happier, more positive person.
- Tua al Fawwal as Amira Thalia Mahmood (born 2000), the protagonist of season 4. After graduating high school, Amira struggles with impending adulthood, as well as maintaining a balance between her "two worlds," one where she is a typical German teenager, and the other where she carries the responsibilities and duties of a young Muslim woman in her community. This is further complicated when Amira begins to fall in love with her brother's best friend, Mohammed, a refugee who identifies as a non-Muslim.

==== Second Generation ====
- Mina-Giselle Rüffer as Nora Machwitz (born September 11, 2003), the central character of the fifth season. She is Kiki and Zoe's younger sister, and a gifted artist. When her season begins, she is still living with her mother, who struggles with alcoholism. As the season progresses and their mother goes to rehab, Nora begins to struggle with her own mental health. She is eventually diagnosed with dissociative disorder, and moves in with Ava and Zoe into Kiki's old apartment to focus on herself and her recovery. She also begins dating Josh Zimmermann, who is supportive of Nora's mental health journey.
- Sira-Anna Faal as Fatou Jallow (born June 17, 2004), the protagonist of the sixth season. In the fifth season, Fatou is portrayed as fairly laid-back and easygoing, but the sixth season reveals her struggles in school, particularly with math and numbers. She is eventually tested and diagnosed with dyscalculia. She also struggles with her feelings for Kieu My Vu, a popular girl at school, who stood by while Constantin and Isi bullied Fatou's best friend, Ava in the past.
- Eren M. Güvercin as Isi Inci (born 2003), the central character of season 7. Isi is Constantin's best friend, but begins to struggle with how his friend's actions make him and others feel. Isi also struggles with her gender identity throughout season 7, eventually affirming her non-binary identity, and their usage of any pronoun. They also apologize to Ava for their past behavior, and begin a romantic relationship with Sascha, a childhood friend.
- Frida Stittrich as Mailin Richter (born 2003), the protagonist of season 8. Mailin lives primarily with her mother and stepfather, and has a vested interest in feminism and environmental causes from her grandmother, who used to be active in political spaces. Mailin struggles with her growing feelings for Finn, who used to date Zoe, and also becomes a target for revenge porn after sharing an intimate photo with classmate Ben.

== Episodes ==
The episodes listed here corresponds to the appearance on funk.net and YouTube.

=== Series overview ===
Season	Episodes	Originally released		
Season	Episodes	First released	Last released	Network
1	10	March 19, 2018	June 8, 2018	ZDFneo funk
2	10	December 17, 2018	March 1, 2019	ZDFneo funk
3	10	March 9, 2019	May 17, 2019	ZDFneo funk
4	10	June 8, 2019	September 22, 2019	ZDFneo funk
5	10	September 20, 2020	November 27, 2020	ZDFneo funk
6	10	December 13, 2020	February 20, 2021	ZDFneo funk
7	10	October 24, 2021	December 31, 2021	ZDFneo funk
8	10	April 24, 2022	July 1, 2022	ZDFneo funk

=== Season 1 ===
The first season contains ten episodes and centers on Hanna Jung and her relationship with Jonas.

No. overall	No. in season	Title	Duration	Original release date
1	1	"Liebe ist alles (Love is everything)"	18 min	24 March 2018
2	2	"Wir alle zusammen (All of us together)"	14 min	30 March 2018
3	3	"Freunde (Friends)"	13 min	6 April 2018
4	4	"Die Party ist vorbei (The party is over)"	11 min	20 April 2018
5	5	"Vorfreude (Anticipation)"	18 min	29 April 2018
6	6	"Fick dich! (Fuck you!)"	18 min	4 May 2018
7	7	"Einmal Schlampe, immer Schlampe! (Once a slut, always a slut!)"	23 min	18 May 2018
8	8	"Blutige Drohung (Bloody Threat)"	25 min	25 May 2018
9	9	"Abstürze (Crashes)"	19 min	1 June 2018
10	10	"Partyhelden (Hero-Party)"	30 min	8 June 2018

=== Season 2 ===
The second season contains ten episodes and centers on Mia Winter and her relationship with Alex.

No. overall	No. in season	Title	Duration	Original release date
11	1	"Jungs sind scheiße! (Boys Suck!)"	22 min	21 December 2018
12	2	"Brüste, Fatshaming & Kakao (Breasts, Fatshaming & Cocoa)"	27 min	28 December 2018
13	3	"Mach mit ihr Schluss!!! (Break up with her!!!)"	23 min	4 January 2019
14	4	"Die schönste Frau der Welt (The prettiest Woman on Earth)"	33 min	11 January 2019
15	5	"Der Abi Chaker Clan (The Abi Chaker Clan)"	28 min	25 January 2019
16	6	"Perfectly Wrong"	22 min	1 February 2019
17	7	"Panikherz (Panic Heart)"	30 min	8 February 2019
18	8	"Ghost Girl"	18 min	15 February 2019
19	9	"Keine Angst! #MeToo (No fear! #metoo)"	34 min	22 February 2019
20	10	"Liebst du mich? (Do you love me?)"	30 min	1 March 2019

=== Season 3 ===
The third season contains ten episodes and centers on Matteo Florenzi and his relationship with David.

No. overall	No. in season	Title	Duration	Original release date
21	1	"Einfach abhauen! (Just running away!)"	21 min	15 March 2019
22	2	"Joints & Sandwiches"	23 min	22 March 2019
23	3	"Neon-Schmetterlinge (Neon butterflies)"	20 min	29 March 2019
24	4	"Unter Wasser (Under Water)"	21 min	5 April 2019
25	5	"Ich bin nicht schwul (I'm not gay)"	20 min	12 April 2019
26	6	"Das Wichtigste im Leben (The most important thing in life)"	25 min	19 April 2019
27	7	"Zusammen oder allein? (Together or alone?)"	26 min	26 April 2019
28	8	"Outing"	21 min	3 May 2019
29	9	"Liebe (Love)"	22 min	10 May 2019
30	10	"Unsere Zeit ist jetzt (Our time is now)"	23 min	17 May 2019

=== Season 4 ===
The fourth season contains ten episodes and centers on Amira Thalia Mahmood. The first episode links this with the last season and the last two episodes center around Mia and Hanna and bring their story to a conclusion.

No. overall	No. in season	Title	Duration	Original release date
31	1	"Der Abiball! (Prom!)"	20 min	14 June 2019
32	2	"Die Frau mit dem kalten Blick (The woman with the cold gaze)"	17 min	26 July 2019
33	3	"Herzklopfen (Racing Heart)"	22 min	2 August 2019
34	4	"Das erste Date (The first Date)"	29 min	9 August 2019
35	5	"Gebrochene Herzen (Broken Hearts)"	24 min	16 August 2019
36	6	"Eskalation (Escalation)"	25 min	23 August 2019
37	7	"Du bist so wie du bist (You are who you are)"	22 min	30 August 2019
38	8	"Verliebt (In love)"	30 min	6 September 2019
39	9	"Hör auf dein Herz! (Follow your heart!)"	33 min	13 September 2019
40	10	"Alles ist Liebe (Everything is love)"	35 min	22 September 2019

=== Season 5 ===
The fifth season contains ten episodes and centers on Nora Machwitz, younger sister of Kiki Machwitz, while also introducing a new generation.

No. overall	No. in season	Title	Duration	Original release date
41	1	"Alles neu! (Everything new!)"	27 min	25 September 2020
42	2	"Angriff (Attack)"	21 min	2 October 2020
43	3	"Stalker"	27 min	9 October 2020
44	4	"Kalte Küsse (Cold kisses)"	28 min	16 October 2020
45	5	"Ende und Anfang (End and Beginning)"	32 min	23 October 2020
46	6	"Unterdruck (Underpressure)"	24 min	30 October 2020
47	7	"Ich fühle nichts (I don't feel anything)"	21 min	6 November 2020
48	8	"Absturz (Crash)"	27 min	13 November 2020
49	9	"Du bist nicht allein (You are not alone)"	34 min	20 November 2020
50	10	"Fühlen (Feel)"	40 min	27 November 2020

=== Season 6 ===
The sixth season contains ten episodes and centers on Fatou Jallow.

No. overall	No. in season	Title	Duration	Original release date
51	1	"Neue Galaxien (New Galaxies)"	20 min	18 December 2020
52	2	"Gay Silence"	23 min	25 December 2020
53	3	"Supernova"	26 min	1 January 2021
54	4	"Du bist fake (You are fake)"	19 min	8 January 2021
55	5	"Ich bin nicht gut genug (I'm not good enough)"	22 min	15 January 2021
56	6	"Schwerelos (Weightless)"	28 min	22 January 2021
57	7	"Einfach vergessen (Just forgot)"	24 min	29 January 2021
58	8	"Lichtjahre entfernt (Lightyears away)"	21 min	5 February 2021
59	9	"Der Antrag (The Proposal)"	26 min	12 February 2021
60	10	"Bis in die Unendlichkeit? (Until eternity?)"	28 min	20 February 2021

=== Season 7 ===
The seventh season contains ten episodes. It centers on the character of Isi Inci.

No. overall	No. in season	Title	Duration	Original release date
61	1	"Alles ist verzaubert (Everything is enchanted)"	21 min	29 October 2021
62	2	"Friendzone?"	24 min	5 November 2021
63	3	"Fühlst du es? (Can you feel it?)"	23 min	12 November 2021
64	4	"Too much!"	20 min	19 November 2021
65	5	"Wir sind anders (We are different)"	21 min	26 November 2021
66	6	"Nur ein Kuss (Just a kiss)"	17 min	3 December 2021
67	7	"Wer willst du sein? (Who do you wanna be?)"	22 min	10 December 2021
68	8	"Love is Pain"	19 min	17 December 2021
69	9	"Mehr als Freundschaft (More than friendship)"	24 min	24 December 2021
70	10	"BE YOURSELF!"	28 min	31 December 2021

=== Season 8 ===
The eighth season contains ten episodes and centers around the character of Mailin Richter. This season also concludes the stories of the "second generation" of characters introduced in season five.

No. overall	No. in season	Title	Duration	Original release date
71	1	"Kein kitschiger Scheiß (No kitschy shit)"	20 min	29 April 2022
72	2	"Hirn gegen Herz (Brain vs heart)"	24 min	6 May 2022
73	3	"Der erste Kuss (The first kiss)"	21 min	13 May 2022
74	4	"On Fire"	21 min	20 May 2022
75	5	"So wie du bist (The way you are)"	20 min	27 May 2022
76	6	"Chaos"	15 min	3 June 2022
77	7	"Zeit zurückdrehen (Turning back time)"	25 min	10 June 2022
78	8	"Nichts ist wie es war (Nothing is as it was)"	20 min	17 June 2022
79	9	"Total verletzt (Totally hurt)"	25 min	24 June 2022
80	10	"Für immer (Forever)"	31 min	1 July 2022
