= Die Discounter =

2021–2024 German TV series

- Genre: Mockumentary
- Inspired by: Vakkenvullers
- Directed by: Emil Belton; Oskar Belton; Bruno Alexander
- Starring: Marc Hosemann; Bruno Alexander; Ludger Bökelmann; Klara Lange; Merlin Sandmeyer; Marie Bloching; David Ali Rashed; Nura Habib Omer; Wolfgang Michael; Doris Kunstmann
- Country of origin: Germany
- Original language: German
- No. of seasons: 4
- No. of episodes: 40

Production
- Producers: Christian Ulmen *Carsten Kelber
- Running time: 15–25
- Production company: Pyjama Pictures

Original release
- Network: Amazon Prime Video
- Release: 17 December 2021 – present

Die Discounter is a German mockumentary by Pyjama Pictures, the production agency owned by Christian Ulmen and Carsten Kelber. It was developed, written, and directed by twin brothers Emil and Oskar Belton and Bruno Alexander and premiered on Amazon Prime on December 17th 2021. The series is based on the Dutch TV show Vakkenvullers. There are content similarities to the US sitcom Superstore, as well as formal similarities to mockumentaries like The Office and its German version Stromberg.

== Plot ==
The show takes place in and around the fictitous discount store „Feinkost Kolinski" (= "delicatessen Kolinski", a small supermarket in Hamburg-Altona (seasons 1 and 2) and later in Hamburg-Billstedt (season 3 onward). A documentary crew films the daily work life of branch manager Thorsten, the assistant manager Pina, the floor workers Titus, Peter, Flora, Lia, Samy, Wilhelm, Mrs. Jensen, and security guard Jonas. Talking head interviews with select characters appear as regular intermissions.

Themes of the show include the chronically terrible daily balances of the branch, a childish rivalry between the three Hamburg Kolinski branches, as well as Thorsten's tense relationship with his boss Sabine Kolinski. Apart from Thorsten's branch, there are Kolinski branches in Hamburg-Eimsbüttel and Hamburg-Eppendorf. The first two seasons take place in Hamburg-Altona but at the end of season two Thorsten and his team are forced to relocate to the run down branch in Hamburg-Billstedt as punishment. Though almost all of the employees do not take their jobs seriously (e.g. lacking hygiene of the supermarket) and lack a sense of responsibility they do show a strong group cohesiveness.

Season one begins with Thorsten embezzling €15,000 meant for security cameras. He uses it to inflate his branch's less than great balances. Because of a silly rivalry between the Kolinski branches, this seems to become Thorsten's downfall. The first season covers the events until Thorsten's 20 years as manager anniversary party. The last episode of the season is a making-of featuring interviews with all the actors as well as directors.

== Cast ==
=== Main characters ===
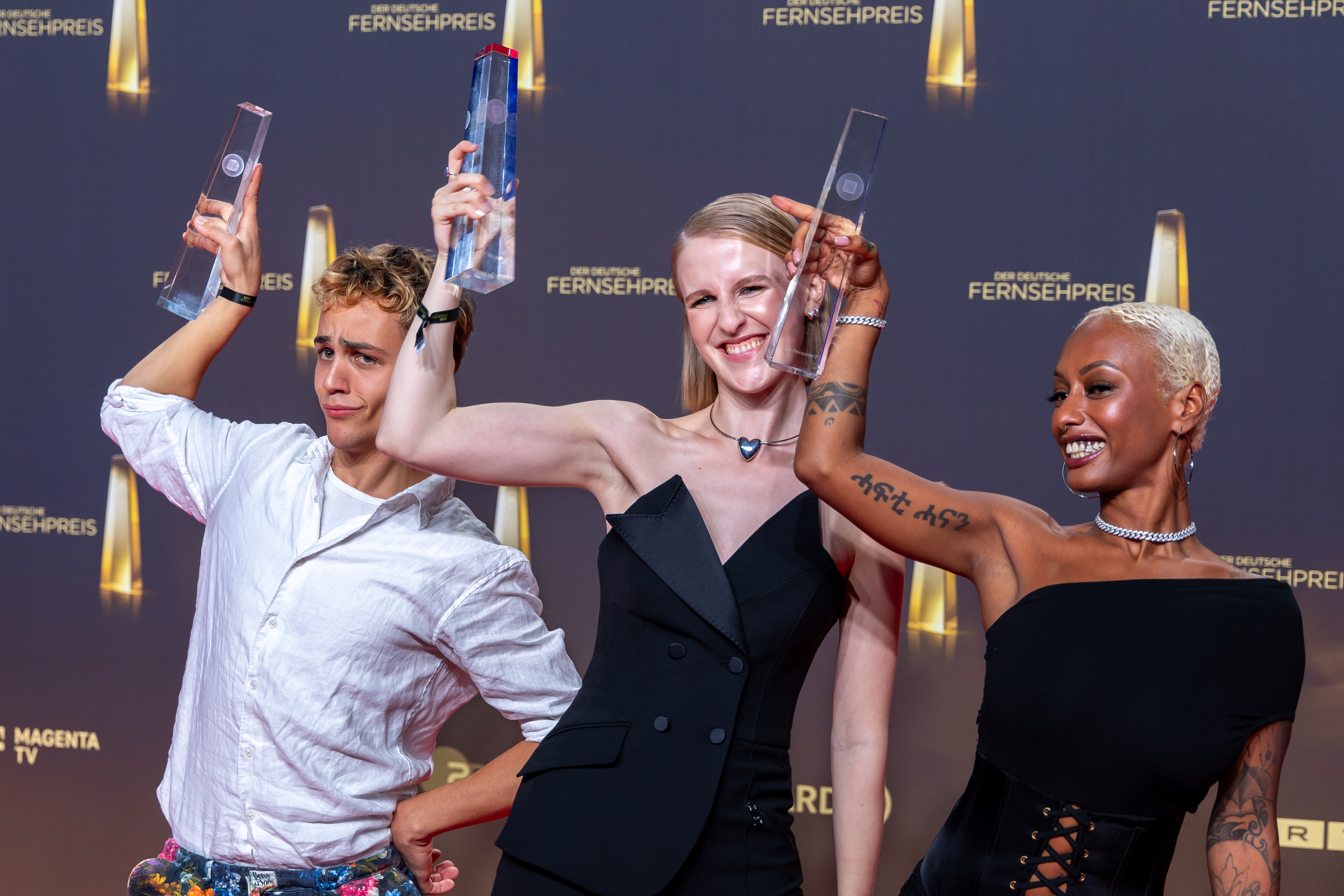
David Ali Rashed, Klara Lange and Nura Habib Omer with the Deutscher Fernsehpreis 2024 (German TV Award) für Die Discounter

- Marc Hosemann as Thorsten Kruse is an egocentric boss who is willing to do anything to look like he is doing better than his rivals. He grew up in Hamburg Mümmelmannsberg and often claims to have received "business education from the streets", a harsh contrast to his branch consistently failing. He runs the store authoritatively, underpaying his employees and offending several other labour laws as we find out in season 2. The success of his leadership style is mixed; most of his employees do not take him very seriously. However, he can be skilled motivator, though usually only on issues of battling with the other Kolinski branches or avoiding change.
- Bruno Alexander as Titus Paulsen is the new guy on the team. Because he is the quiet type he initially has some trouble settling in. He functions as a protagonist for the viewer commenting on the actions of everyone else. Throughout the course of the show he falls for Lia, though various circumstances consistently avoid the two of them getting closer.
- Merlin Sandmeyer as Jonas, security guard of the store. He is a little shy, very vulnerable and can hardly ever assert himself. The show often hints at him never having successfully caught a shoplifter yet. He is also a recovering alcoholic who relapses several times throughout the show. His shyness makes it hard for him to live out his homosexuality. He discovers in season 2 that he has Savant syndrome for mathematics.
- Ludger Bökelmann as Peter is bit of a yob and very full of himself. He sometimes hurts people acting like that, like Pina, who loses her virginity to him. Throughout the series it becomes clear that he acts this way to cover a softer, more vulnerable side of himself.
- Klara Lange as Pina Kaiser is the assistant branch manager. She is the only employee of Thorsten's who is competent and conscientious at her job. Because of this, management considers firing Thorsten and making Pina branch manager in several episodes, however Thorsten always finds a way to prevent it. Her truly smart ideas to raise the balances of the branch almost always fail due to Thorsten's lack of interesent in them. Pina appears shy and held back, in many ways an emodiment of the wallflower archetype. At the same time she has unexpected (to the rest of the cast) sexual partners and hidden talents.
- Marie Bloching as Lia is rather bored. She works the register wearing a neck cushion since she occasionally likes to fall asleep there. Her biggest worry is getting stuck working at the supermarket for the rest of her life since she originally intended for the job to be short term employment. She is interested in Titus, the viewer only finds this out later when Titus also falls for her.
- Nura Habib Omer as Flora wants to become a famous rapper. She is very self confident and has a big mouth.
- David Ali Rashed as Samy/450er is 450er through and through. He is cool and a bit stuck in a rut.
- Doris Kunstmann as Misses Jensen is a veteran at Koliniski. Her younger colleagues often seek her life advice.
- Wolfgang Michael as Wilhelm has been working as a janitor forever. Since the passing of his wife he has started Candle-making in her honor. Him trying to sell the handmade candles in the supermarket is a source of conflict between him and Thorsten. He lived in the attic of the supermarket for while because Thorsten didn't want him to sleep at a homeless shelter. During this time and with Thorsten's consent, he ate expired food from the store and worked for free in exchange for room and board. In season 2 the health department busts his shelter during a routine visit and he has to return to the homeless shelter. Wilhelm has problems recognizing his limits with regards to alcohol and drinks himself into oblivion in several episodes.

=== Side characters ===
- Alexander Merbeth as Claude, a homeless man living outside the supermarket (who moves with Thorsten's team to Billstedt in season 3)
- Lo Rivera as Beyza, Mrs Kolinski's right-hand woman and Thorsten's crush in season 1, who herself has a crush on Pina.
- Catrin Striebeck as Sabine Kolinski, owner and boss of all Kolinski branches. She is similarly authoritarian as Thorsten and likes to let the three branch managers - her own husband among them - feel her power. One of the branches is run by a woman (Britta) at the beginning of the show, but Sabine fires her because men are easier to suppress, according to her. Her relationship with Thorsten is extremely tense and she tries to fire him on more than one occasion. When at one point the opportunity arises, they also have a sexual affair, which further fuels the rivalry between the branches.
- Samirah Breuer as Kimi, Samy's girlfriend. She works at Kolinski Eimsbüttel.
- Emil Belton as Henry and Oskar Belton as Pelle. The twin brothers both work at Kolinski Eimsbüttel and appear as friends or foes to Titus especially.
- Lisa-Marie Koroll as Lisa, Titus' short-term girlfriend. He ends the relationship when he realizes his feelings for Lia.
- Regine Hentschel as Judith, Jonas' mother who uses a wheelchair.
- Adam Bousdoukos as Georgios, branch manager of Kolinski Eimsbüttel starting in season 2. In the early days he is wrapped up in his rivalry with Thorsten. They both like to play dirty, for example when Georgios has his team kidnap Jonas. After wiping the slate clean following that conflict, the managers become friends and start helping each other out; they warn the other when the health department is coming for a surprise checkup or combine forces to outdo the snobby Eppendorf branch. In one episode Georgios mentions having had a sexual affair with Sabine Kolinski just like Thorsten did.
- Fridolin Sandmeyer as Kalle, Jonas' boyfriend and (as they later found out) brother.
- Lisa Hagmeister as Susanne, cleaner at Kolinski, Peter's mother and at some point girlfriend of Thorsten.
- Oskar Bökelmann as Anton, Peter's older brother.
- Eric Cordes as Kevo, a temporary replacement for Jonas as the security guard. He is the total opposite of Jonas; assertive, intelligent and physically strong, as well as popular with his coworkers. Since he repeatedly points out Thorsten's countless labour law violations to his colleagues, Thorsten finds a pretense to fire him.
- Hannah Schiller as Zoe, neighbour to the Billstedt branch and girlfriend of Samy/450er.

=== Special Appearances ===
==== Season 1 ====
- Fahri Yardım as himself in Episode 1.
- Buddy Ogün as shoplifter in episode 2.
- Peter Fox as himself in episodes 5 and 9.
- Nina Petri as Britta, branch manager in episode 5.
- Christian Ulmen has a Cameo appearance as a disguised customer in episode 5.
- Christoph Glaubacker as Tobias, instructor for nonviolent communication in episode 8.
- Leon Blaschke as Felix in episodes 4 and 9 as soccer player and Lia's boyfriend.
- Magnus Mariuson as Carlos, love interest of Jonas in episodes 7 and 9.

==== Season 2 ====
- Kida Khodr Ramadan as himself in episode 1.
- Frederick Lau as himself in episode 1.
- Mats Hummels as himself in episodes 4 and 5.
- Caro Daur as herself in episode 5.
- Anna Böttcher as Misses Jakubi of the department of health in episode 6.
- Ralph Herforth as Andreas, Sabine Kolinski's husband and branch manager in Eppendorf in episodes 6 and 8.
- Stephan Schad as Mr Lewicki, hired by sabine Kolinski to raise the daily balances of Thorsten's branch in episode 7.
- Paula Hartmann as Charly, contestant in the Koliniski summer games for one of the other branches.

==== Season 3 ====
- Heinz Strunk as branch manager in Hamburg-Eppendorf in episode 3.
- Martin Brambach and Luise Wolfram in episode 4 as staff of the skidome.
- Cem-Ali Gültekin as Döner salesman in episode 7.
- Celo & Abdi (German rap duo) as themselves in episode 7.

==== Season 4 ====
- Anke Engelke as herself in episode 1.
- Claudia Obert as herself in episode 1.
- Gisa Flake as Miss Ukena, safety instructor in episode 1.
- Axel Milberg als Ludwig, Manager of the Eppendorf branch in episodes 1 and 6.
- Milena Tscharntke as Lieschen, employee at Kolinski Eppendorf and temporarily Titus' girlfriend in episodes 1 through 3 and 8.
- Johanna Götting, Elias Bachmann and Leon Seidel as employees at Kolinski Eppendorf in episodes 1 through 3.
- Luisa Vohrer as customer Lou in episode 2.
- Jonas Nay as Moritz, policeman and boyfriend of Lia in episodes 3 and 5.
- Flari Meyer as Airsoft-child in episode 3.
- Fahri Yardım as himself in episode 4.
- Luisa Neubauer as herself in episode 4.
- Adam Bousdoukos as Georgios in episode 6.
- Anja Herden as Mrs Ötü, lecturer of the regional managers training seminar in episode 6.
- Maximilian Janisch as himself in episode 6.
- Jan Böhmermann as himself in episode 7.
- Oliver Schulz as himself in episode 7.
- Fabian Rommel as Mr Onur, sales agent for tents in episode 8.

== Production ==
The twin brothers Emil and Oskar Belton along with Bruno Alexander directed the TV show. The latter played one of the main characters "Titus" while the Belton-twins occasionally appeared in two smaller roles as employees of the Eimsbüttel branch. The producers Christian Ulmen and Carsten Kelber gave complete creative freedom to the three young directors. The original idea came from the dutch TV show Vakkenvullers (English: „shelf stockers"). Season one was filmed over the course of 23 days and is mostly improvised. While the plot of each episode was provided by the directors, all resulting dialogue and character interactions are spontaneous improvisation. The most exaggerated plots were occasionally shared in advance with the relevant actor(s) only. This made the shocked reactions of other characters authentic.

The first two seasons were filmed in what was previously an Aldi on Kieler Straße in Hamburg Stellingen quarter. Seasons three and four were filmed in a different former Aldi on Gubener Straße in Hamburg-Jenfeld. The move happened because the old location was turned into refugee housing.

Flora is portrayed by German Rapper Nura. Her song Niemals Stress mit Bullen (Englisch: "no beef with cops") can be heard twice throughout the series. 9

== Episodes ==
Season one debuted on December 17^{th}, 2021 on Amazon Prime Video. Season two followed on November 11^{th}, 2022, season three on November 22^{nd}, 2023. Season four came out in two parts; the first six episodes launched on November 27^{th}, 2024, the latter four were released on December 23^{rd}, 2024. There are a total of 40 episodes, ten per season. The last episode of season one is a Making-of and the last episode of season two is a Mockumentary of a Making-of.

== Reception ==
Die Discounter has been compared to Stromberg (German The Office) because of the workplace mockumentary setting and its portrayal of the branch manager as its main character. Reception of the series was predominantly positive.

Birgit Fuß wrote for Rolling Stone, "[...] most of it is indeed quite funny. It's a bit heavy on the potty humor and cheap punchlines, but what's really too bad is season one ending in retching - in episode nine. Episode 10 is merely a making-of, likebale, but not a proper season finale. Dramaturgically a little dissappointing.""

Aurelie von Blazekovic wrote rather negatively for Süddeutsche Zeitung: "Die Discounter is the good kind of German comedy. Since the series follows international formats it has to be measured against those as well, and it can't [...] Unfortunately, the loveable charm is where die Discounter often fall short. Characters suddenly act abysmally mean to a point you're left wondering who or what you are supposed to be laughing at. Assholes are only funny when they're not really assholes."

Nina Pauer of Die Zeit wrote: "The trio Alexander/Belton [...] achieved something truly rare in German TV and streaming with Die Discounter: a breath of fresh air. Not one that was advertised and staged beforehand, but a true, spontaneous one."

Jan Freitag of Tagesspiegel called the TV show's concept "more economically than socioculturally founded. Still, die discounter is worth a watch, at least for those unfamiliar with Stromberg"

== Awards ==
- 2022: Blue Panther – TV & Streaming Award for Most popular TV series
- 2022: Mönchengladbacher Videopreise –for Low Budget Production
- 2024: Deutscher Fernsehpreis for Best Comedy Series

== Weblinks ==
- Die Discounter at IMDb
- Die Discounter at fernsehserien.de
