= Pablo Grant =

German actor and rapper (1997–2024)

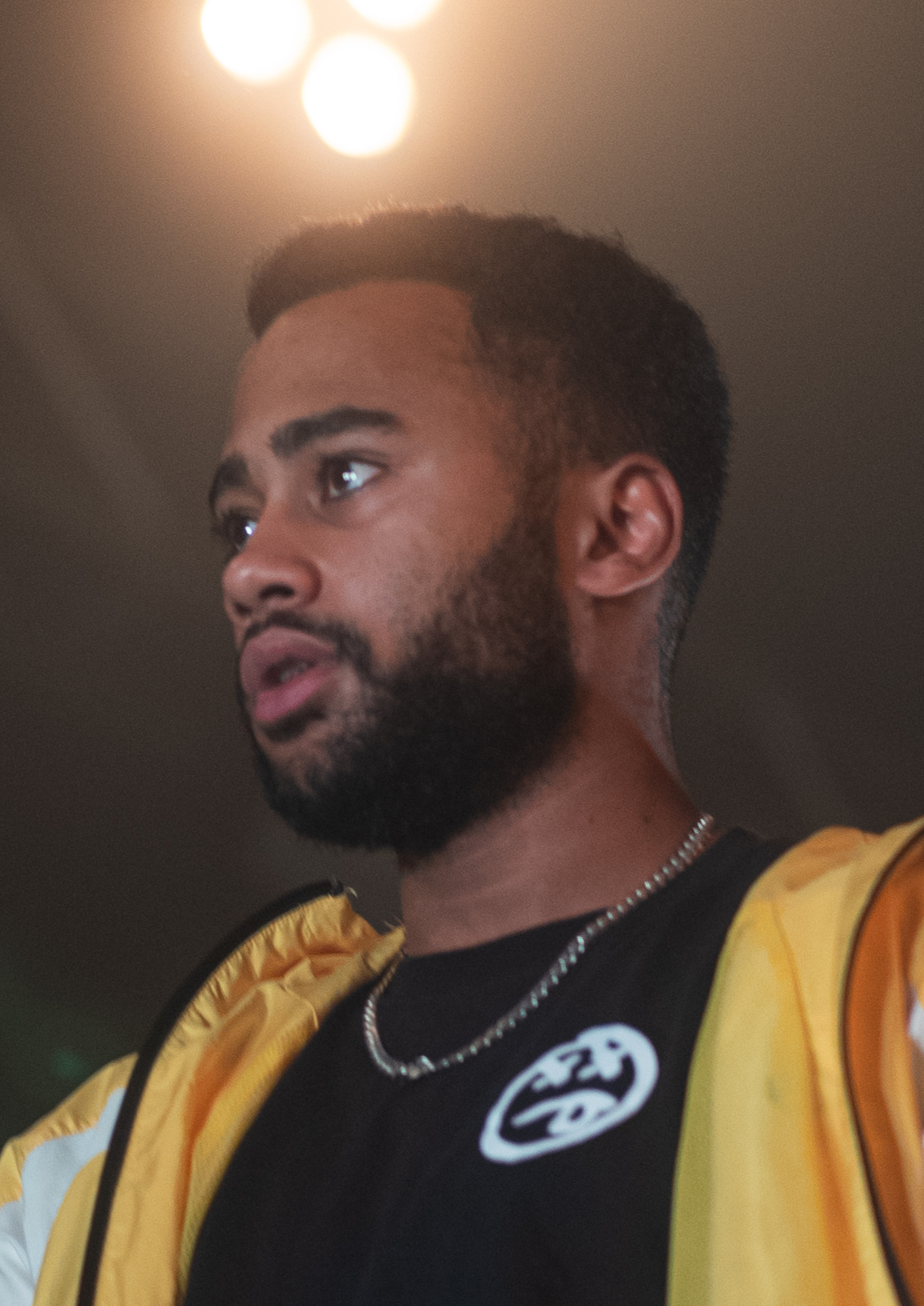
Grant in 2019

Pablo Grant (25 October 1997 – 6 February 2024) was a German actor and rapper based in Berlin. He was also a member of the Berlin rap collective BHZ under the name Dead Dawg. He died at age 26 on 6 February 2024 of a thrombosis.

== Biography ==
Pablo Grant was born in Berlin in 1997, and completed his acting studies in 2017 at the Transform Schauspielschule (Transform Acting School) in Berlin. He started acting in television and films in 2015, and made his film debut in the German Bibi and Tina movie Bibi & Tina: Mädchen gegen Jungs. In 2018–2019 he appeared in the streaming and ZDFneo-broadcast series Druck. In 2020, he joined the Magdeburg cast of German detective series Polizeiruf 110 in the role of criminal detective Günther Márquez. He also appeared in numerous other German television series through 2023.

Grant was also a musician. Under the name "Dead Dawg" he was a member of the rap collective BHZ based in the Schöneberg area of Berlin. He released his first solo album Dunklschwarz in 2019.

On 6 February 2024, Grant died from a thrombosis at the age of 26. His death was announced by BHZ on social media on 11 February 2024. A few days before his death, the group cancelled a planned tour, citing short-term illness related reasons.
