= Edward Sizzerhand =

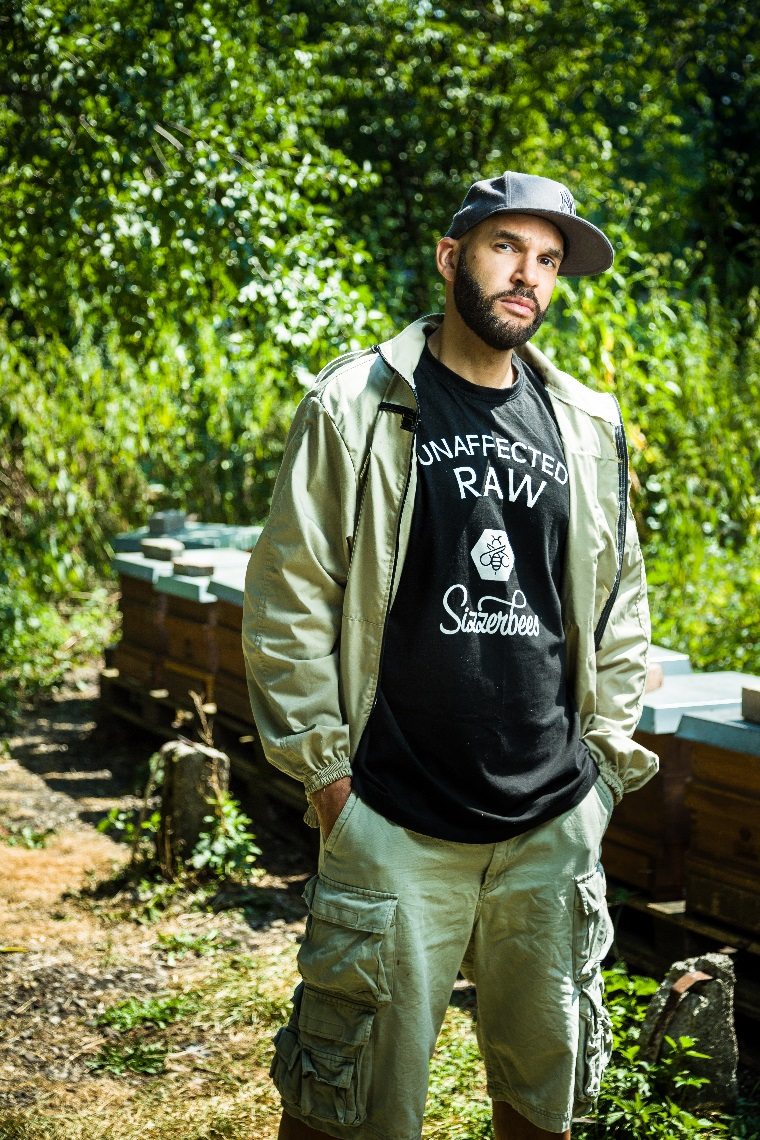
Edward Sizzerhand - 2019

Edward Sizzerhand also known as Steady Fingaz is a Brooklyn (NYC) born DJ and record producer who has won a number of renown competitions as a DJ and together with his group Square One performed in collaboration with American artists in Europe. He is also one half of the DJ duo "Unorthodox Twinz", together with DJ Oz.

== Biography ==
Sizzerhand has won a number of renown competitions as a DJ and together with his group Square One performed in collaboration with American artists in Europe. Through the publication of several Mixtapes and his US underground hiphop and rap supporting website www.hiphopnews.de he reached a high level of professional recognition. On Square One Walk of Life, launched in 2001, he published his first Production. This LP featured on Show Down / WEA did not only raise great interest in Europe but also in Japan and North America.

Sizzerhand also did tracks and remixes with acts like Diggin In The Crates' A.G. and Party Arty, Fiva MC & Radrum, and many more.

== Label ownership ==
DJ Edward Sizzerhand currently owns a tape label called "OnTheMix Records" which was founded in 1999 and has so far released several mixtapes including drops of other DJs such as DJ Oz, DJ Man at Arms, Spill, Sir Cut, DJ Web, DJ K-One, Rob Reece and M-Tech who has won the German DMC championship 2002 have done joint projects with OnTheMix.

== Discography ==
=== Albums ===
- 2001: Square One – Walk of Life (Show Down Records)
- 2002: Square One – Walk of Life +1 (Japan Import) (MicLife Records)

=== Singles ===
- 1998: Square One – Mind.Body.Soul. (Show Down Records)
- 1999: Square One – State Of The Art (Show Down Records)
- 2001: Square One – Applause (Show Down Records)
- 2001: Square One – Can't Mess / Backstabbers (Show Down Records)
- 2001: Square One – Fallen Angels (Show Down Records)
- 2001: Square One – Countdown (Show Down Records)

=== Mixtapes ===
- 1996: Edward Sizzerhand – The Low Wheels of the Industry (OnTheMix Records)
- 2000: Edward Sizzerhand & DJ Man-At-Arms – OnTheMix (OnTheMix Records)
- 2000: Edward Sizzerhand – Exhilarating Archive (Phlatline Records)
- 2005: Edward Sizzerhand – ClubSoul
- 2006: Edward Sizzerhand – ClubSoul K1X Edition

== See also ==
- List of turntablists
