= Pasquale Aleardi =

Swiss actor

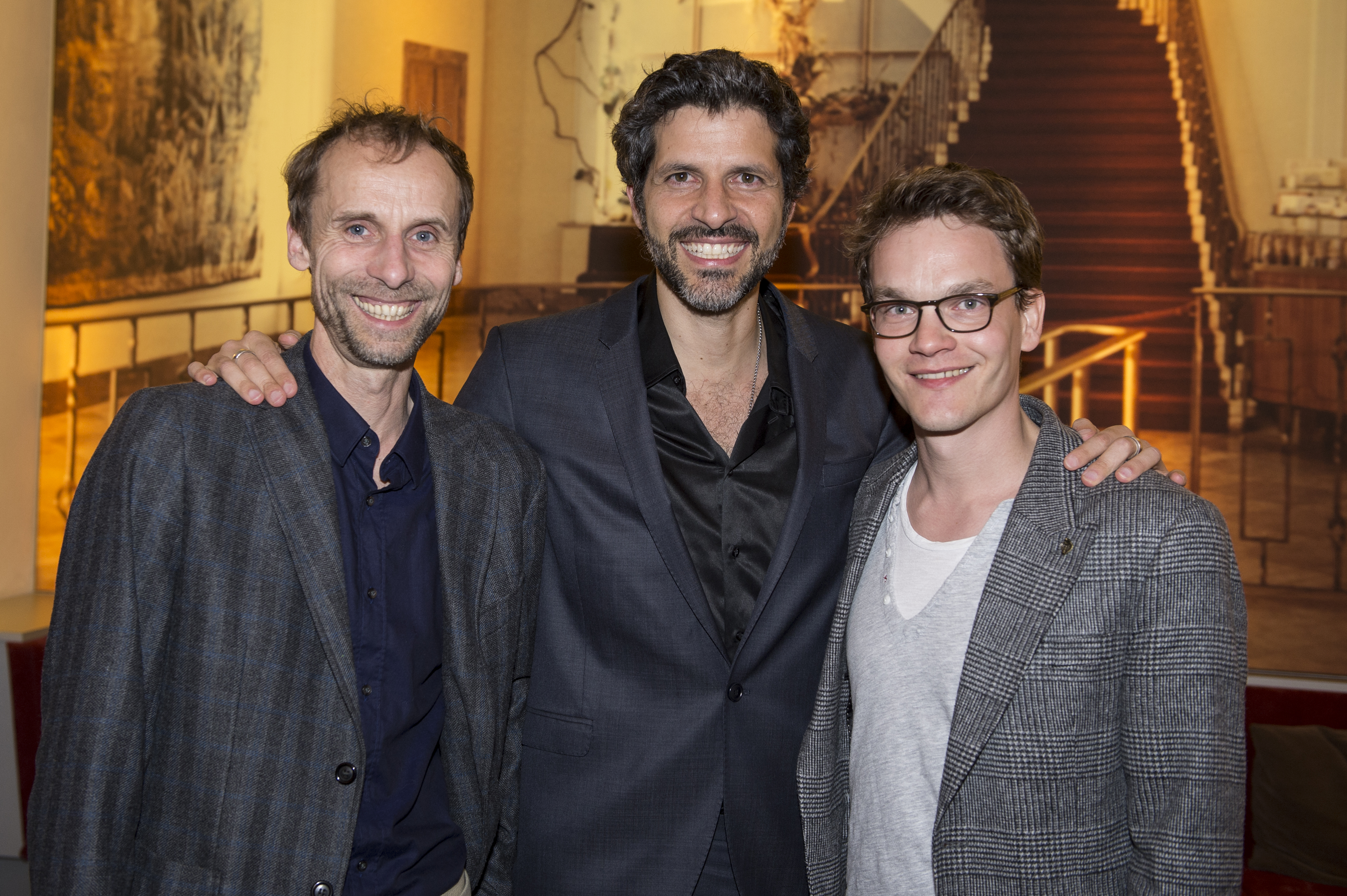
- Jan Georg Schütte, Pasquale Aleardi (centre) and Ludwig Blochberger in 2014, cast of Death in Brittany
- Born: 1 June 1971 (age 55); Zürich, Switzerland
- Occupation: Actor
- Years active: 1994–present

Pasquale Aleardi (born 1 June 1971) is a Swiss actor. He is known for playing the role of J.D. Salinas in Resident Evil. He also starred as Billy Flynn in the Broadway production of Chicago.

In 2016, Aleardi starred in the lead role of Tommaso, an Italian miner, in Gotthard (2016). The film is the largest-scale Swiss TV production ever made and had its world premiere on 2 August 2016 during the traditional Prefestival evening at the Locarno Film Festival.

Aleardi is the son of Greco-Italian emigrants. He was hired for his first Swiss film role in Jazz (1994). Despite the sudden success, he left the Zurich University of the Arts in 1995 and went to Germany, where he took up acting engagements at theaters in Bonn, Düsseldorf and Cologne.

After several theatrical successes on German stages with plays such as The Big Bang by Arthur Miller (Best Production NRW 96 / Berliner-Theatertreffen), his interest focused on film. He played alongside Veronica Ferres in the TV movie Für immer verloren ("Forever Lost") and made his German cinema debut in At Night in the Park, acting alongside Heike Makatsch and Heino Ferch. He played the main role in a film version of Bertolt Brecht's Baal, where he played the role of Ekart alongside Matthias Schweighöfer, and his performance alongside Milla Jovovich in Resident Evil gave him his first exposure on the international stage.

One of his greatest successes was when he played copilot Peter Landolt in the 2006 film Grounding – Die letzten Tage der Swissair ("Grounding – The Last Days of Swissair").

In Germany, Aleardi acted in the 2006 film Schöner Leben ("A More Beautiful Life"), as well as in the film adaptation of Frank Wedekind's play Lulu. In the Anke Engelke series Frauengeschichten ("Stories of Women"), he showcased his comedic talents. In autumn 2006, the German film comedy Wo ist Fred? ("Where Is Fred?") was released, in which Aleardi played an egocentric marketing manager, whose life is made difficult by Alexandra Maria Lara, Jürgen Vogel and Til Schweiger. At the same time, the Swiss television production Süssigkeiten ("Sweets") was released, in which he plays a charming show-off who tries everything to save his company from ruin.

Pasquale Aleardi lives in Zurich and speaks five languages. In addition to acting, he is active in music. He sings, plays the piano and has been a member of the Cologne music project Big Gee since 2004.

In 2017, he won a Swiss Film Award for Best Leading Actor for playing the role of Tommaso in Gotthard in (2016).

== Selected filmography ==
- 1994: Jazz – Renato
- 1995: Das sprechende Grab – Adrian, the Magician
- 2001: Die Salsaprinzessin (TV Movie) – Ruben
- 2001: Mein Vater die Tunte – Max
- 2002: Resident Evil – J.D.
- 2002: At Night in the Park – Rosenblum
- 2002: 24 heures de la vie d' une femme – Paulo
- 2002: Weihnachtsmann gesucht (TV Movie) – Phillip Wittkamp
- 2003: Instinct for Crime (TV Movie) – Frieder Goltz
- 2003: Für immer verloren (TV Movie) – Yussuf Öztürk
- 2004: Baal (TV Movie) – Ekart
- 2004: Chaos Mum (TV Movie) – Cesar
- 2004: Schöne Männer hat man nie für sich alleine (TV Movie) – Daniel
- 2005: Die Bullenbraut – Ihr erster Fall (TV Movie) – Dr. Alexander Pahlenberg
- 2006: Grounding – Die letzten Tage der Swissair – Peter Landolt
- 2006: Schöner leben – Josef Maurer
- 2006: Storm Tide (TV Movie) – Mario Puzzo
- 2006: Süssigkeiten (TV Movie) – Nick Sander
- 2006: Where Is Fred? – Benno Held
- 2007: Verrückt nach Clara (TV Series) – Simon
- 2007: Sperling (Episode: "Sperling und die kalte Angst") – Barras
- 2007: Der letzte Zeuge (Episode: "Totgeschwiegen")
- 2007: Polizeiruf 110 – Tod eines Fahnders (TV Series) – Robert Sakowski
- 2007: Manatu (TV Movie) – Mark Mickler
- 2007: Missing (TV Movie) – Gabriel Siebert
- 2007: Erdbeereis mit Liebe (TV Movie) – Fabio
- 2007: Keinohrhasen – Anwalt
- 2008: Fast Track: No Limits – Gregor Gargolov
- 2008: Willkommen im Westerwald (TV Movie) – Ahmad al Mansur
- 2008: Eine bärenstarke Liebe (TV Movie) – Beat Geser
- 2008: Der Tag, an dem ich meinen toten Mann traf (TV Movie) – Torben / Robert
- 2009: Dutschke (TV Movie) – Gaston Salvatore
- 2009: Volcano (TV Movie) – Phil Friedrichs
- 2010: Spook Inn (TV Movie) – Ralf Dienert
- 2010: Masserberg (TV Movie) – Carlo Sanchez
- 2010: Taxiphone – Oliver
- 2011: Schicksalsjahre (TV Series) – Wolfgang Heye
- 2011: Ein Sommer in Paris (TV Movie) – Philippe Clement
- 2011: What a Man – Etienne
- 2011: Men in the City 2 – Maurizio Marquez
- 2012: Im Brautkleid meiner Schwester (TV Movie) – Xavier
- 2012: Munich '72 (TV Movie) – André Spitzer
- 2012: The Spinning Program (TV Movie) – Angelo Manuardi
- 2012: Nur eine Nacht (TV Movie) – Marc Simon
- 2013: Bereullin – Dagan
- 2013: Wer liebt, lässt los! (TV Movie) – Stephan Iwersen
- 2013: Herztöne (TV Movie) – Paul Ingwersen
- 2013: Scale 6 (TV Movie) – Sebastian Scherrer
- 2013: Tatort (Episode: "Die Wahrheit stirbt zuerst") – Peter Albrecht
- 2013: Robin Hood and I (TV Movie) – Robin Hood
- 2013: The Dad Test (TV Movie) – Moritz Kaiser
- since 2014: Brittany Mystery (TV Series, 11 episodes) – Commissaire Georges Dupin
- 2014: Head Full of Honey – Carabinieri Straßensperre
- 2015: Famous Five 4 – Prosecutor
- 2015: The Small and the Wicked – Rolf Schäfers
- 2016: Gotthard (TV Movie) – Tommaso Lazzaroni
- 2019: Bingo im Kopf (TV Movie) – Mirko Mortauk
- 2022: The Ordinaries – Herr Cooper

== Awards and nominations ==
Year	Award	Category	Nominated work	Result
2011	Monte-Carlo Television Festival Award	Mini-Series – Best Performance by an Actor	Men in the City 2	Nominated
2017	Swiss Film Award	Best Actor	Gotthard (TV mini series)	Won
