= Milena Tscharntke =

German actress (born 1996)

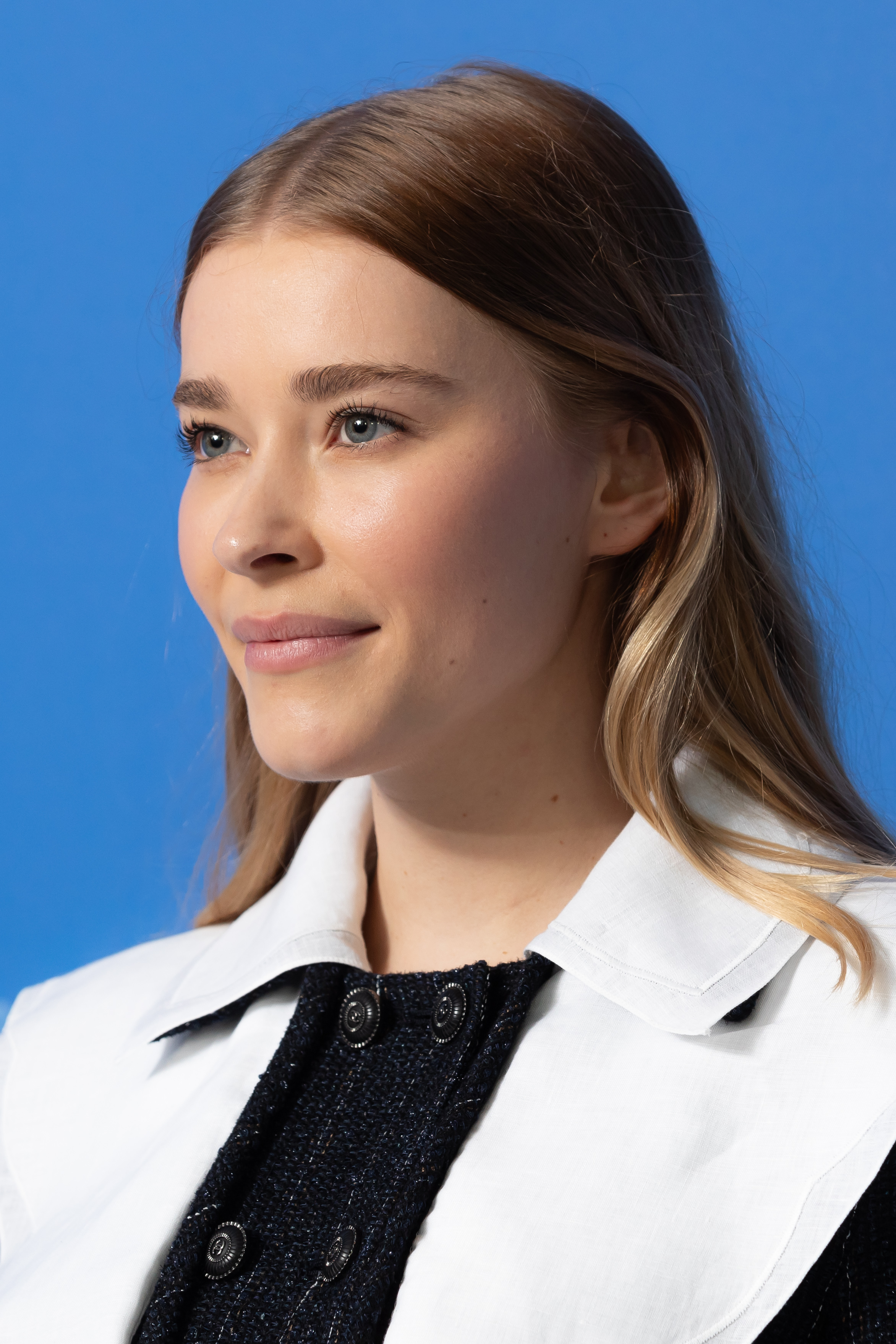
- Tscharntke at the 2020 Berlin International Film Festival
- Born: 1996 (age 29–30); Hamburg, Germany
- Occupation: Actress
- Years active: 2004–present
- Mother: Andrea Lüdke

Milena Tscharntke (German pronunciation: [miˈleːna ˈtʃaʁntkə]; born 1996) is a German actress. She won a Goldene Kamera for her role in the television film Alles Isy (2018).

== Biography ==
Tscharntke was born in Sasel district of Hamburg. Her mother, Andrea Lüdke, is also an actress. She has two sisters. She was discovered after accompanying her older sister to a casting call, and began acting at the age of eight. She attended school at the Carl-von-Ossietzky-Gymnasium, graduating in 2014.

== Filmography ==
=== Film ===
| Year | Title | Role | Ref. |
|---|---|---|---|
| 2008 | The Wild Chicks and Life | Verena | |
| 2011 | Jungle Child | Young Judith | |
| 2015 | Bruder vor Luder | Jessy | |
| 2016 | Radio Heimat | Carola Rösler | |
| 2018 | The New End | Daughter | |
| 2018 | Raus | Judith | |
| 2019 | Bonnie & Bonnie | Girlfriend | |
| 2020 | The Roads Not Taken | Anni | |
| 2021 | One Night Off | Marie | |
| 2022 | Just Something Nice | Johanna | |
| 2024 | Chantal in Fairyland | Little Red Riding Hood | |

=== Television ===
| Year | Title | Role | Notes | Ref. |
|---|---|---|---|---|
| 2004 | Stubbe – Von Fall zu Fall | Lisa | 1 episode | |
| 2005 | Die Gerichtsmedizinerin | Girl in boutique | 1 episode | |
| 2007 | Schuld und Unschuld | Luise Behnsen | Television film | |
| 2007–2009 | Bernd das Brot | Anastasia Potzler | 21 episodes | |
| 2011–2013 | Sturmfrei | Kim | 9 episodes | |
| 2017 | Leipzig Homicide | Leonie Schott | 1 episode | |
| 2017 | Notruf Hafenkante | Amelie Steinbach | 1 episode | |
| 2018 | Der Lehrer | Louisa | 1 episode | |
| 2018 | SOKO Hamburg | Tine Harms | 1 episode | |
| 2018 | Alles Isy | Isy | Television film | |
| 2018 | Hanna's Homecoming | Eva | Television film | |
| 2018–2019 | Druck | Mia Amalie Winter | 33 episodes | |
| 2019 | Alarm for Cobra 11 – The Highway Police | Gwindil | 1 episode | |
| 2019 | We Are the Wave | Sophie | 5 episodes | |
| 2021 | Tod von Freunden | Cecilie Jensen | 7 episodes | |
| 2021 | The Witnesses | Theresa Stern | 1 episode | |
| 2021 | Tatort: Unsichtbar | Anna Schneider | 1 episode | |
| 2022 | The Privilege | Sophie Bergmann | Television film | |
| 2022 | Das Märchen vom Frosch und der goldenen Kugel | Princess Matilda | Television film | |
| 2022 | Yesterday We Were Still Children | Luisa | 6 episodes | |
| 2022–2024 | Die Discounter | Lieschen | 6 episodes | |
| 2023 | The World's Nicest People | Tanya | 2 episodes | |
| 2024 | Die stillen Mörder | Mia Stocker | Television film | |
| 2024 | Tatort: Unsichtbar | Zenaida | 1 episode | |
| 2024 | Turmschatten | Marie Stresemann | 6 episodes | |
| 2025 | Intimate | Charlotte | 3 episodes | |
| 2025 | Charlotte Link – Einsame Nacht | Mila Henderson | Television film | |

== Awards and nominations ==
| Award | Year | Category | Nominated work | Result | Ref. |
|---|---|---|---|---|---|
| Goldene Kamera | 2019 | Best Young Actress | Alles Isy | Won | |
