= Vincent Wilkie =

Vincent Wilkie (born 1969) is a German electronic singer-songwriter and webdesigner of British descent.

In the period between 1995 and 2000, Wilkie mainly released as "lotte ohm." (not to be confused with the German actress by the same name). This included several albums, singles, remixes and collaborations with various members of Germany's electronic and hip hop scene. He also appeared as "The Dope Fiend" and as a member of zany dada-electro duo "Pieter Bohlen & Dieter Maffay", together with Gautsch (a.k.a. DJ Malente). In 1996, he produced Empty Chairs by Colin Wilkie, his father.

Wilkie's biggest hit was "Hinter Diesen Mauern" in 1999, a collaboration with ex-Fischmob rapper Sven Mikolajewicz as "Sven Franzisko". The single, released as the "official soundtrack single" of computer game Dungeon Keeper 2 entered the German single charts within a week of release and remained there for eleven weeks, peaking at no. 32.

In 2006, Wilkie resurfaced as "Instant Wilkie", releasing an album called Big in Japan.

== Discography ==
As "Vincent Wilkie & The Unexpected":

- 1994 A Pocketful of Truth (CD, Rude Boy Records)

Als "lotte ohm.":

- 1996 Die Liebe in den Zeiten des Rinderwahns (EP, Disko Grönland)
- 1997 Letzte Tanke vor Babylon (LP/CD, Disko Grönland)
- 1997 Wenn sie wirklich will (EP, WEA)
- 1998 Lotte Ohm. (LP, Disko Grönland)
- 1998 Das Ohmsche Gesetz (LP/CD, WEA)
- 1998 Besserwisser (EP, WEA)
- 1998 Besserwisser-Remixes (EP, WEA)
- 2000 17 Grad (CD, WEA)
- 2000 Wege zur Glückseligkeit (EP, WEA)
- 2000 Die Abenteuer des Gustav Gans (EP, WEA)

As "The Dope Fiend":

- 1998 Slack Bobs Are Delicious (LP/CD, WEA)

As "Sven Franzisko":

- 1999 Hinter diesen Mauern (EP with Sven Mikolajewicz, WEA)

As "Pieter Bohlen & Dieter Maffay":

- 2000 Gehirn Amputiert (CD, Plattenmeister)

As "Instant Wilkie":

- 2006 Big In Japan (Online album, lichterkettenraucher.)
- 2007 Big In Japan Remixes (Online album, lichterkettenraucher.)
- 2008 A Robot In Your Headlights (Online album, lichterkettenraucher.)
