= Silent Friend =

2025 film by Ildikó Enyedi

- German theatrical release poster
- German: Stille Freundin
- Directed by: Ildikó Enyedi
- Written by: Ildikó Enyedi
- Produced by: Reinhard Brundig; Nicolas Elghozi; Mónika Mécs; Meng Xie
- Starring: Tony Leung Chiu-wai; Luna Wedler; Enzo Brumm; Yun Huang; Sylvester Groth; Martin Wuttke; Johannes Hegemann; Rainer Bock; Léa Seydoux
- Cinematography: Gergely Pálos
- Edited by: Károly Szalai
- Music by: Gábor Keresztes; Kristóf Kelemen
- Production companies: Pandora Film; Galatée Films; Inforg-M&M Film; Radiance Films; Arte France Cinéma; ZDF/Arte
- Distributed by: Pandora Film (Germany); Mozinet (Hungary)
- Release dates: 5 September 2025 (Venice); 15 January 2026 (Germany)
- Running time: 147 minutes
- Countries: Germany; France; Hungary; Hong Kong
- Languages: German; English; Cantonese
- Box office: $2 million

Silent Friend (German: Stille Freundin) is a 2025 historical drama film written and directed by Ildikó Enyedi. Starring Tony Leung Chiu-wai, Léa Seydoux, Luna Wedler, Enzo Brumm, Sylvester Groth and Martin Wuttke, it follows a single ginkgo tree through three loosely connected stories in different eras: 1908, 1972, and 2020, taking place in the old university town of Marburg, Germany.

The film had its world premiere in the main competition of the 82nd Venice International Film Festival on 5 September 2025, where it won the FIPRESCI Prize and the Marcello Mastroianni Award for Wedler. It was theatrically released in Germany by Pandora Film on 15 January 2026.

It was also selected as the Hungarian entry for the Best International Feature Film at the 99th Academy Awards.

== Plot ==
In 1908, Grete, a determined young German woman, applies to become one of the first female students admitted to the Marburg University. During her entrance examination, the botanic department professor's board attempts to humiliate her with sexually charged questions on Linnaeus' classification of plants, that reveal both the professors' gender bias and her scientific knowledge. Distressed but well-prepared, Grete easily answers them. Overwhelmed, she runs to the Botanischer Garten Marburg adjacent to the campus, which includes an old ginkgo tree. She is found by Thomas who shares that she was the only woman accepted by the committee. After attending a female group gathering at the ginkgo tree in the early morning hours, Grete is expelled from a family home where she is renting a room, accused of promiscuity. Sheltered by Herr Fuchs, who hires her as an assistant in to his photography studio, Grete grows fond of professional photography work, capturing her research objects. At the University, she applies to a Thomas-led college trip to the "East Indies", offering her work as a professional photographer.

In 1972, solitary student Hannes lives in a shared house near the campus, but spends most of his free time reading at the botanical garden near the ginkgo tree. One of his housemates, Gundula, researches people-plant interactions. Hannes is initially indifferent, due to the farm work he endured in his youth, but attempts to connect with her through Goethe's Metamorphosis of Plants;but she rebukes him for his lack of knowledge. During a camp fire with Gundula's friends, she asks whether he would have sex with her since he's supposedly still a virgin, which a confused Hannes quickly denies. Gundula leaves for a trip, leaving him responsible for watering the plants, particularly a purple geranium in her room connected to an activity sensor. Hannes overwaters it, displaying a strong reaction on the sensor. Fascinated, he improves the functions of the sensor, enabling it to open the gate of the residence when it senses his presence. After leaving a student protest to water the garden, with two classmates accompanying him, the gate opens as the men carelessly drink and smoke in the same room as the geranium; Hannes quickly kicks them out. Later, Hannes receives a postcard from Gundula where she mentions another student named Peter has expressed interest in her. Hannes is annoyed, and the geranium sensor mirrors his disapproval.

In early 2020, neurologist Dr. Tony Wong travels from Hong Kong to Marburg aiming to complete his research on newborn brain activity. But shortly after his first class, the COVID-19 pandemic disrupts his plans. Adjusting to his new life under lockdown and unable to continue his work, Wong regularly visits the botanical garden, where he grows fond of the old ginkgo tree, dating back to 1832. Advised through video calls by French botanist Dr. Alice Sauvage, he quickly adapts a new research study trying to match his own neurological activity with the ginkgo's activity. Attaching an improvised brain scanner on it, he suspects a deep relationship between what is seen and unseen. Anton, the University's janitor, appears to be distressed by the research and destroys the equipment. Alice sends male ginkgo tree pollen to fertilize the Marburg's solitary female ginkgo, while Anton comes to terms with Wong, offering him a local German dish. Both of them watch the ginkgo's fertilization process through the scanner.

== Cast ==
- Tony Leung Chiu-wai as Dr. Tony Wong
- Léa Seydoux as Dr. Alice Sauvage
- Luna Wedler as Grete
- Enzo Brumm as Hannes
- Sylvester Groth as Anton
- Marlene Burow as Gundula
- Martin Wuttke as Herr Fuchs
- Johannes Hegemann as Thomas
- Rainer Bock as Prof. Winterhalter
- Yun Huang as Jule
- Luca Valentini as Francesco
- Sky Hofmann as Peter
- Felix Burose as Max
- Jan Hofmann
- Johannes Scheidweiler as Udo

== Production ==
=== Development ===
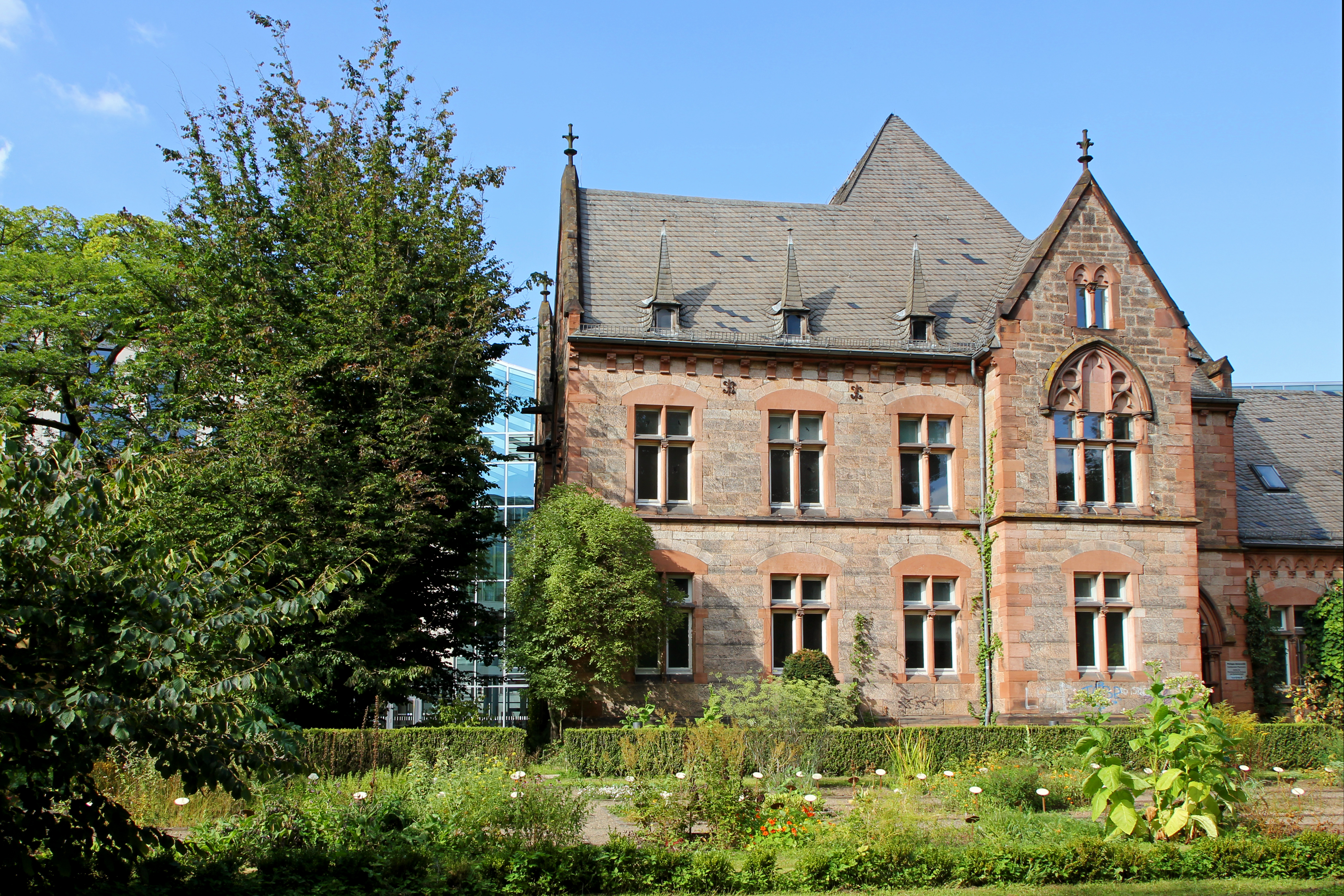
The film was shot at the Alter Botanischer Garten Marburg.

Tony Leung Chiu-wai was announced as a cast member in August 2023; director Ildikó Enyedi stated that she wrote the role specifically for him. It marked Leung's second film outside of Asia, after Shang-Chi and the Legend of the Ten Rings (2021), and his first European production.

It is a German-French-Hungarian-Chinese co-production, and is produced by Pandora Film (Germany), Galatée Films (France), Inforg - M&M Film (Hungary) and Radiance Films (China), in co-production with Arte France Cinéma and ZDF/Arte.

In November 2023, the film received a €500,000 production grant from Eurimages. The Hesse Film Office awarded the film €550,000. The film was also supported by National Film Institute Hungary, German Federal Film Fund (DFFF), Film- und Medienstiftung NRW, BKM, Filmförderungsanstalt, Centre national du cinéma et de l'image animée, Moin Filmförderung and MEDIA Programme of the European Union.

=== Filming ===
Principal photography began in April 2024. The film was primarily shot in Marburg, specifically at the Alter Botanischer Garten Marburg at Marburg University. Filming also took place in Cologne. The film includes a scene depicting the animated videos used in a prior experiment with infants.

Aiming to distinguish the time periods, Hungarian cinematographer Gergely Pálos shot them in various formats: the 1908 German Empire segment was filmed in black-and-white 35 mm film; the 1972 West Germany segment was filmed in 16 mm film; and the 2020 contemporary Germany segment was filmed digitally. It marked Pálos first collaboration with Enyedi. Károly Szalai served as editor. Hungarian musicians Gábor Keresztes and Kristóf Kelemen composed the original score.

== Release ==
Films Boutique acquired the international sales rights to the film in May 2024. The film was presented at the Cannes Film Market in May 2025. A trailer was released on 4 September 2025. The film had its world premiere in the main competition of the 82nd Venice International Film Festival on 5 September 2025, followed by its North American premiere on 9 September at the 2025 Toronto International Film Festival. It was also screened at the BFI London Film Festival. In November 2025, Silent Friend screened at the 46th Cairo International Film Festival where Ildikó Enyedi received a lifetime achievement Award and presented a masterclass titled "Poetry of reality".

It was theatrically released in Germany by Pandora Film on 15 January 2026.

== Reception ==
=== Critical response ===
On the review aggregator website Rotten Tomatoes, 94% of 72 critics' reviews are positive, with an average rating of 8.2/10. The website's critical consensus states: "Surveying the natural world and the people who wander through it with generous empathy, Silent Friend is one of writer-director Idikó Enyedi's most lyrical and profound efforts yet". Metacritic, which uses a weighted average, assigned the film a score of 90 out of 100, based on 17 critics, indicating "universal acclaim".

Stephanie Bunbury of Deadline wrote that the film is "beautiful, elusive and peppered with provocative nuggets about the nature of life and our place in it."

=== Accolades ===
Award	Date of ceremony	Category	Recipient(s)	Result	Ref.
Venice Film Festival	6 September 2025	Golden Lion	Ildikó Enyedi	Nominated	
Venice Film Festival	6 September 2025	FIPRESCI Prize	Ildikó Enyedi	Won	
Venice Film Festival	6 September 2025	Premio CinemaSarà	Ildikó Enyedi	Won	
Venice Film Festival	6 September 2025	Edipo Re Award	Ildikó Enyedi	Won	
Venice Film Festival	6 September 2025	Green Drop Award	Ildikó Enyedi	Won	
Venice Film Festival	6 September 2025	Leoncino d'Oro Award – Cinema of UNICEF	Ildikó Enyedi	Won	
Venice Film Festival	6 September 2025	Marcello Mastroianni Award	Luna Wedler	Won	
Chicago International Film Festival	24 October 2025	Gold Hugo	Silent Friend	Nominated	
Chicago International Film Festival	24 October 2025	Best Cinematography	Gergely Pálos	Won	
Valladolid International Film Festival	1 November 2025	Silver Spike	Silent Friend	Won	
San Francisco International Film Festival	26 April 2026	Sloan Science on Screen Award	Silent Friend	Won	

== See also ==
- List of submissions to the 99th Academy Awards for Best International Feature Film
- List of Hungarian submissions for the Academy Award for Best International Feature Film
