= Dimitrij Schaad =

German actor (born 1985)

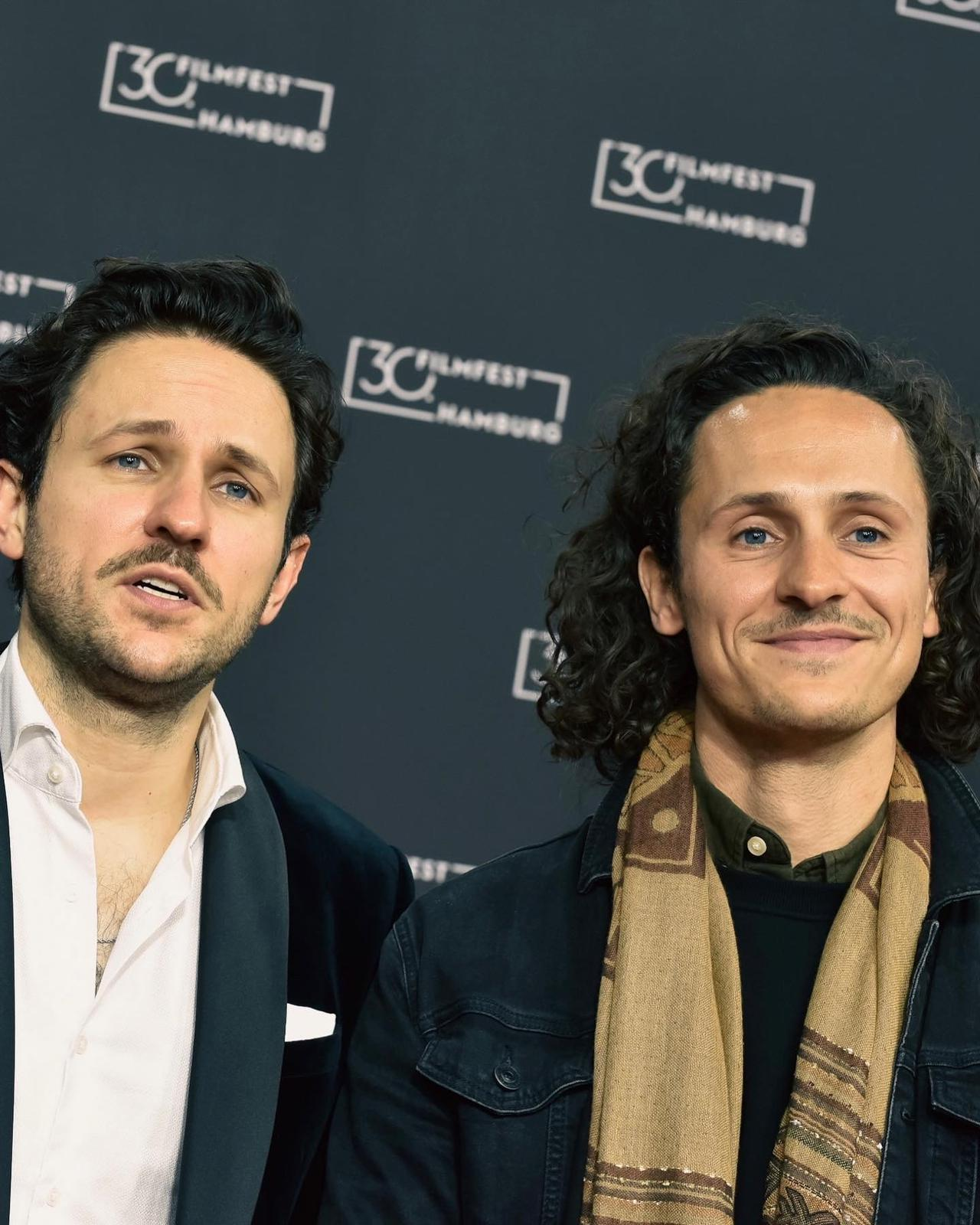
- Schaad (left) with his brother Alex in 2022
- Born: 17 September 1985 (age 40); Kaskelen, Kazakh Soviet Socialist Republic
- Occupations: Actor and screenwriter/playwright

Dimitrij Schaad (Russian: Дмитрий Александрович Шаад, Dmitri Alexandrovich Schaad; born 17 September 1985) is a German actor, screenwriter, and playwright. In addition to a stage career in Germany, he is known for his acting roles in the Netflix series Kleo, German film adaptations of The Kangaroo Chronicles series, and other screen roles.

== Early life and education ==
Schaad was born in Kaskelen, Kazakh Soviet Socialist Republic, and grew up near Almaty, Kazakhstan, until he was eight years old. In 1993, he moved with his family to Germany, not knowing a word of the language.

He went to high school in Mengen, a small town in Baden-Württemberg. After graduation he studied at the Bayerische Theaterakademie August Everding in Munich from 2005 to 2009, and in 2009 at the State Institute for the Performing Arts in Saint Petersburg in Russia.

He performed at the Metropol-Theater and Munich Kammerspiele in Munich, and had an acting scholarship from the Deutscher Bühnenverein (German Theatre and Orchestra Association) from 2006 to 2008.

== Theatre ==
In 2009 Schaad joined a theatre group in Essen and moved to Schauspiel Bochum from 2010 to 2013. He joined the troupe at the Maxim Gorki Theater in Berlin in 2013. In many of the productions there, Schaad performed monologues that he had written himself. For the 2013/14 season he was voted Young Actor of the Year in the Theater Heute (Theatre Today) critics' poll.

He has been a freelance lecturer at the Ernst Busch Academy of Dramatic Arts since 2015.

From 2019 he started devoting more time to film roles and writing, while still doing some theatre roles.

== Film and TV ==
Schaad had roles in the TV series Killing Eve, Das Boot, and Wir Kinder vom Bahnhof Zoo. From 2022 he played the lead male role of Sven Petzold in the Netflix series Kleo.

He had his first lead film role in the film adaptation of The Kangaroo Chronicles (2020), as well as its 2022 sequel.

In 2022, Skin Deep, the feature film directing debut of his brother Alex Schaad, was released, a movie they wrote together and in which Schaad has a leading role. He also starred in the 2023 film Sophia, der Tod und ich.

He has been a member of the Deutsche Filmakademie since 2022.

== Awards ==
Schaad has won a number of acting and writing awards in Germany, including the Ulrich-Wildgruber-Preis in 2023, and the Deutscher Schauspielpreis in 2023 for best duo with Jella Haase for their performance in Kleo.
