= Alter Botanischer Garten Marburg =

Arboretum in Marburg, Hesse, Germany

Coordinates: 50°48′44.57″N 8°46′20.49″E

- Alter Botanischer Garten am Pilgrimstein
- Interactive map of Alter Botanischer Garten Marburg
- Type: Historic arboretum and botanical garden
- Location: Pilgrimstein 3, Marburg, Hesse, Germany
- Area: 3.6 hectares (8.9 acres)
- Established: 1810
- Founder: Georg Wilhelm Franz Wenderoth (1774–1861)
- Operator: University of Marburg
- Open: Daily, free admission

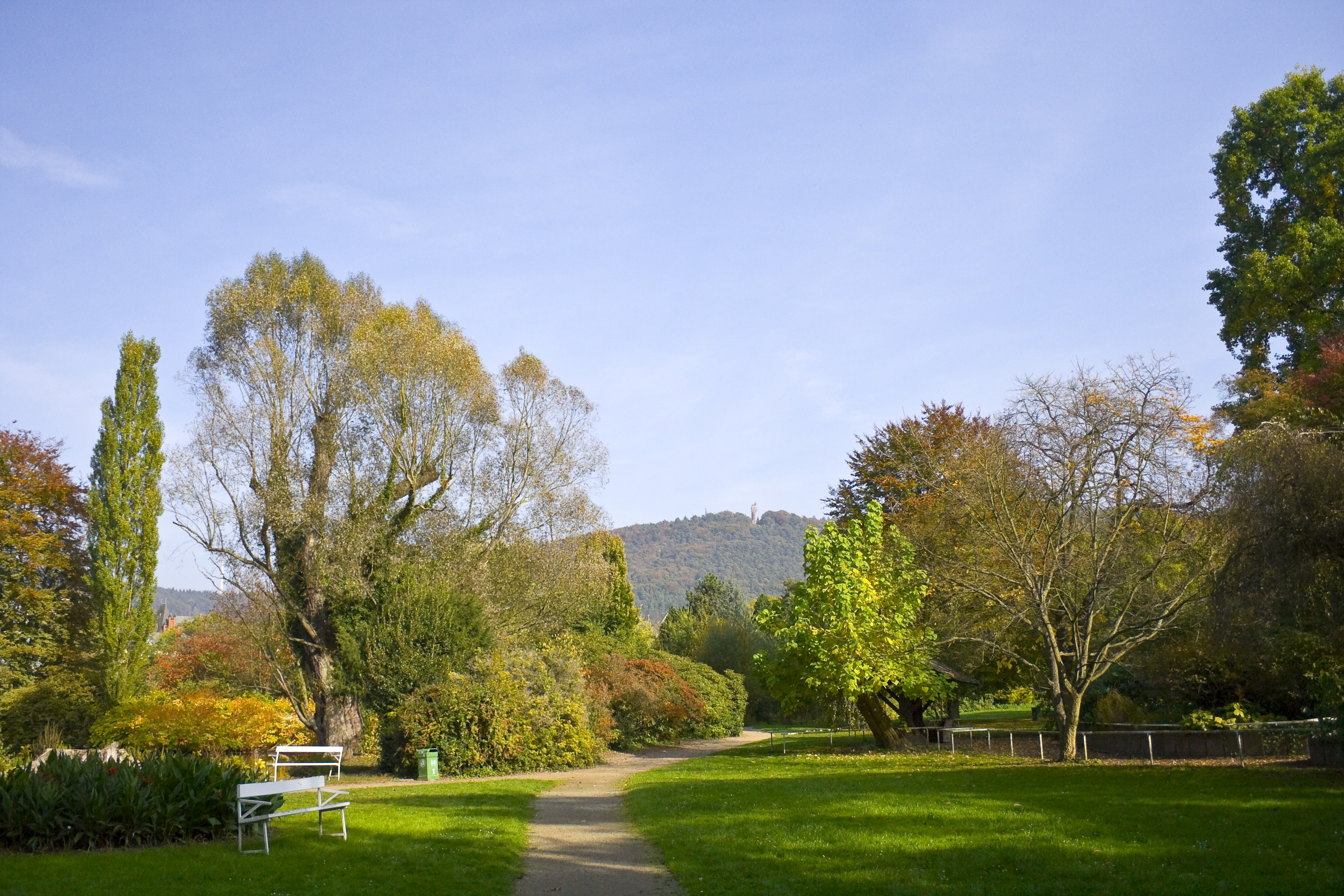
Alter Botanischer Garten Marburg

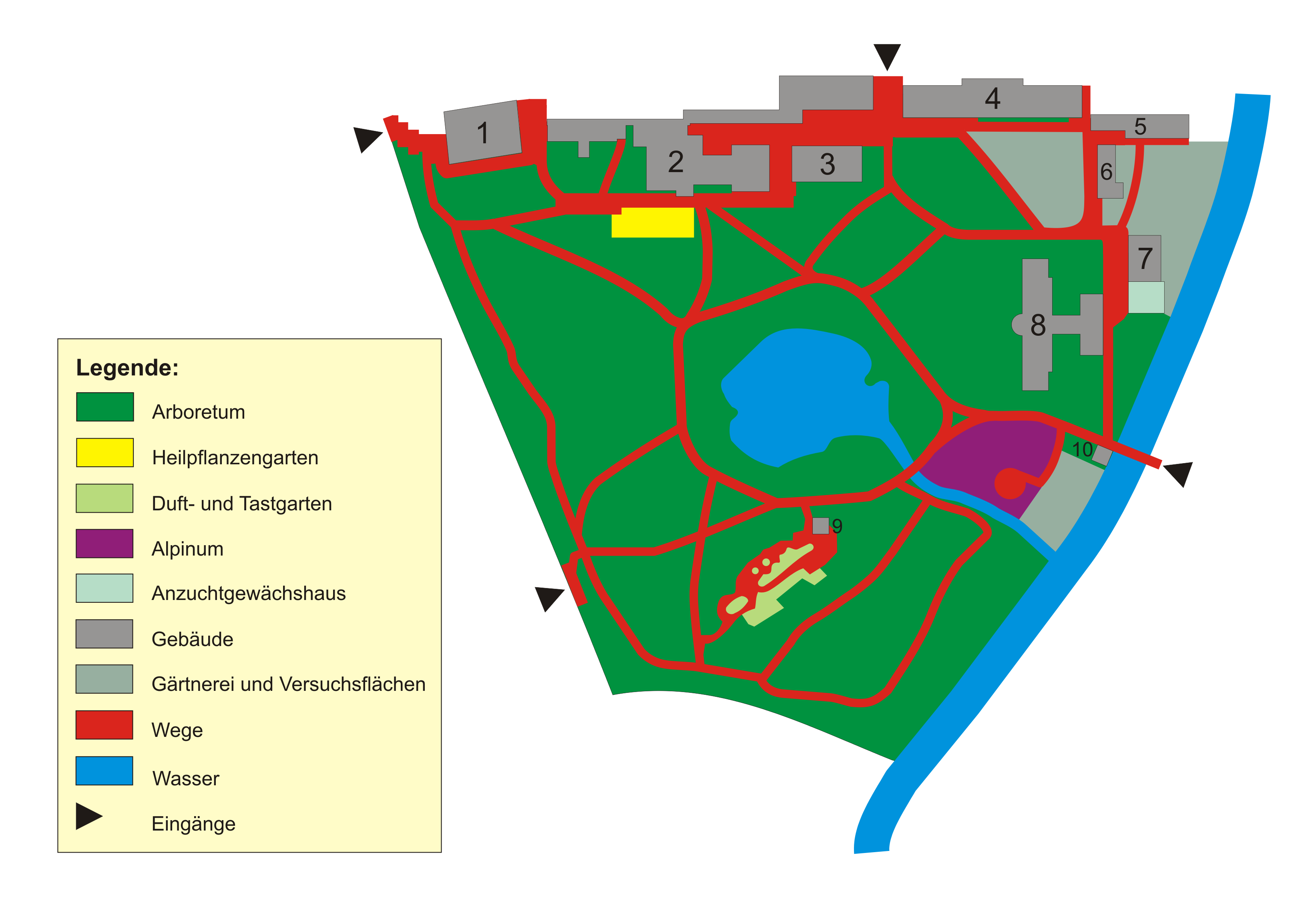
Map of the botanical garden

The Alter Botanischer Garten Marburg (3.6 hectares), also known as the Alter Botanischer Garten am Pilgrimstein, is a historic arboretum and botanical garden maintained by the University of Marburg and located at Pilgrimstein 3, Marburg, Hesse, Germany. It is open daily without charge.

Marburg's first botanical garden was established between 1527 and 1533 when the humanist, poet, physician and botanist Euricius Cordus, considered a founder of scientific botany in Germany, is known to have set up a private botanical garden of which designs little is known today. In 1786 a second garden attempt was created by Professor Conrad Moench near the Elisabeth Church (Marburg).

Today's garden dates to 1810 when Georg Wilhelm Franz Wenderoth (1774–1861) obtained the site from Jérôme Bonaparte in exchange for the earlier Ketzerbach garden, which he then developed into the English style to create a combination of park landscape and scientific garden. In 1861 Albert Wigand transformed the garden to conform with the school of Peter Joseph Lenné and Johann Heinrich Gustav Meyer, creating sections especially for trees. Later on, 1873–1875 the Botanical Institute was built at Pilgrimstein 4 in Gothic Revival style.

In 1977 the university's gardens were transferred to the Neuer Botanischer Garten Marburg, and in 1994 the Old Botanical Garden became a registered cultural monument. Although still owned by the university, it is now used mainly as a public park containing a fine arboretum of mature trees that are over 200 years old, including specimens Quercus petraea, Platanus × hispanica, Salix alba, Liriodendron tulipifera, and many conifers.

== See also ==
- Neuer Botanischer Garten Marburg
- List of botanical gardens in Germany
