= Skin Deep (2022 film) =

2022 film by Alex Schaad

- Theatrical release poster
- German: Aus meiner Haut
- Directed by: Alex Schaad
- Written by: Alex Schaad; Dimitrij Schaad
- Produced by: Tobias Walker; Philipp Worm
- Starring: Jonas Dassler; Mala Emde; Dimitrij Schaad; Maryam Zaree; Thomas Wodianka
- Cinematography: Ahmed El Nagar
- Edited by: Franziska Köppel
- Music by: Richard Ruzicka
- Production company: Walker Worm Film
- Distributed by: X Verleih AG (through Warner Bros.)
- Release date: 5 September 2022 (Venice)
- Running time: 103 minutes
- Country: Germany
- Language: German

Skin Deep (German: Aus meiner Haut) is a German psychological science fiction drama film, directed by Alex Schaad and released in 2022. The film stars Jonas Dassler and Mala Emde as Tristan and Leyla, a couple who are trying to work through their relationship difficulties by travelling to an island that offers temporary body swaps with other people to see the world through different eyes.

They are initially paired with Mo (Dimitrij Schaad) and Fabienne (Maryam Zaree), with Leyla happy in a different woman's body, but after Tristan aborts the swap due to his inability to perform as a musician in Mo's body, Leyla is instead offered the opportunity to swap bodies with Roman (Thomas Wodianka), a gay man grieving the recent death of his partner; however, she finds even greater happiness inhabiting Roman's body, thus raising the questions of whether Tristan can still love her in a male form and whether she's even willing to give Roman back his own body when the swap is due to end.

The cast also includes Edgar Selge, Adam Bousdoukos, Selma Poyraz and Louise von Plessen in supporting roles.

== Production ==
Brothers Alex and Dimitrij Schaad had originally written the screenplay with the intention of Dimitrij playing Tristan, but opted to switch the casting and have him play Mo during development.

== Distribution ==
The film premiered at the 79th Venice International Film Festival.

It went into commercial distribution in Germany in 2023, and in the United States in 2024.

== Critical response ==
Allan Hunter of Screen Daily wrote that "All of the principals play at least one character but also variations of that character that are influenced and shaped by the temporary inhabitant of their body. When Tristan is inhabited by Mo, it allows Dassler to reveal a broad comic talent. When Mo is inhabited by Tristan, Schaad brings a more bashful, sensitive interpretation to the character. Emilie has the most challenging of gear shifts as Leyla constantly seems on the verge of a nervous breakdown until being take over by Fabienne. She is subsequently liberated and carefree when she inhabits the body of alcoholic sailor and island resident Roman (Thomas Wodianka). It all sounds horribly confusing, but there is a clarity and confidence in Alex Schaad’s approach."

David Ehrlich of IndieWire wrote that "As this thoughtful and full-bodied dramatic mess-around wends its way towards some kind of an ending, the movie’s inability to wrangle its infinite possibilities is buoyed by a series of well-blocked scenes that manage to convey all sorts of dysphoria through their camerawork alone. And yet, Leyla’s refusal to go back to her body eventually becomes urgent enough to involve other people, and “Skin Deep” finagles it to do so in a way that faintly resembles something like closure. Escape, however, is another story altogether, but at least these characters might come to appreciate all of the ways in which they're trapped with themselves — and each other."

For The New York Times, Alissa Wilkinson wrote that "once you’ve accepted the more fantastical trappings, the film moves into a different mode. There are metaphors for body image issues and for the experiences of transgender people, rendered in a way that feels unforced. Each swap brings new questions. If you loved someone, and they were suffering, what would it mean to give them your body? If your lover finally felt like themselves in a new body — even one of a different sex — would that change your relationship? When we love someone, what does that actually mean? We love their body? Their soul? Are they even separable?"

== Awards ==
At Venice, it was named the winner of the Queer Lion. In an interview with Variety around the time of the film's American release, the Schaads spoke of having been relieved by the film's reception, as they had feared the possibility of facing criticism as heterosexual men making a film that introduced LGBTQ-related themes.
