= Yun Huang =

Chinese German actress

- Born: November 1, 1991 (age 34); China

Yun Huang (born November 1, 1991) is a Chinese German actress best known for recurring roles in Der Alte and Rote Rosen.

== Early life and education ==
Huang was born in China. She moved to Germany at age 6, and also briefly lived in Japan, Switzerland and Israel. In 2015, she graduated with a bachelor's degree in physical theatre from the Accademia Teatro Dimitri in Switzerland.

== Career ==
Huang's career began in television with a 2018 appearance in an episode of Tatort. She followed this with television roles in In aller Freundschaft and Rote Rosen as well as in the 2020 film Sleep. In 2022, she had recurring roles on Der Alte and the Netflix miniseries Kleo. She appeared in the 2025 Ildikó Enyedi film Silent Friend.

== Filmography ==
=== Film ===
Year	Title	Role
2020	Sleep	Alex
2024	Alter weißer Mann	Kerstin Li Yan Bell
2025	Silent Friend	Julie
2026	Enjoy Your Stay	Sarah

=== Television ===
Year	Title	Role	Notes
2018-2024	Tatort	Maggie, Mina Jiang, Shen Bo	3 episodes
2019	In aller Freundschaft	Chen Mi Lian	4 episodes
2020–2021	Rote Rosen	Ellen Reichard	235 episodes
2021	Leipzig Homicide	Ai Chen	1 episode
2021	Dreiraumwohnung		TV movie
2022	Kleo	Min Sun	6 episodes
2022	Spreewaldkrimi	Toni	1 episode
2022-2026	Der Alte	Julia Luisa Zhao	40 episodes
2023	SOKO Hamburg	Mel Schumann	1 episode
2023	Ostfriesenfeur	Rebecca Simon	TV movie
2024	Bettys Diagnose	Chen Lu Chao	1 episode
2024	SOKO Köln	Leonie Aschmann	1 episode
2026	Der Bergdoktor	Sarah Graupner	1 episode
