= A Christmas Carol (2020 film) =

- Poster
- Directed by: Jacqui Morris
- Written by: David Morris
- Based on: A Christmas Carol by Charles Dickens
- Produced by: Jacqui Morris; David Morris
- Starring: Simon Russell Beale; Carey Mulligan; Martin Freeman; Daniel Kaluuya; Andy Serkis; Leslie Caron
- Cinematography: Michael Wood
- Edited by: Gary Forrester
- Music by: Alex Baranowski
- Production company: Frith Street Films
- Release date: 20 November 2020
- Running time: 95 minutes
- Country: United Kingdom
- Language: English

A Christmas Carol is a 2020 British Christmas drama dance film directed by Jacqui Morris and David Morris and based on Charles Dickens' 1843 novella A Christmas Carol. It features the voices of Simon Russell Beale, Siân Phillips, Carey Mulligan, Daniel Kaluuya, Andy Serkis, Martin Freeman and Leslie Caron. It received mixed reviews from critics.

== Plot ==
The story starts with a grandmother narrating the story to her children as the children prepare a toy theatre for their annual performance of A Christmas Carol. The movie enters the imagination of Emily - the young girl in the family, and the cardboard stage transforms to reveal a magical world.

A close adaptation of the book's prose, this version of A Christmas Carol opens on a bleak, cold Christmas Eve in London, seven years after the death of Ebenezer Scrooge's business partner, Jacob Marley. Scrooge, an elderly miser, despises Christmas and refuses a dinner invitation from his nephew Fred, the son of Scrooge's long-dead sister Fan. He turns away two men who seek a donation from him to provide food and heating for the poor and only grudgingly allows his overworked, underpaid clerk, Bob Cratchit, Christmas Day off with pay to conform to the social custom.

That night Scrooge is visited at home by Marley's ghost, who wanders the Earth entwined by heavy chains and money boxes forged during a lifetime of greed and selfishness. Marley tells Scrooge that he has one chance to avoid the same fate: he will be visited by three spirits and must listen or be cursed to carry much heavier chains of his own.

The first spirit, the Ghost of Christmas Past, takes Scrooge to Christmas scenes of his boyhood. The scenes reveal Scrooge's lonely childhood at boarding school, his relationship with his beloved sister Fan, and a Christmas party hosted by his first employer, Mr Fezziwig, who treated him like a son. Scrooge's neglected fiancée Belle is shown ending their relationship, as she realizes that he will never love her as much as he loves money. Finally, they visit a now-married Belle with her large, happy family on the Christmas Eve that Marley died. When Belle speaks of Scrooge with pity, demands that the ghost remove him from the house.

The second spirit, the Ghost of Christmas Present, takes Scrooge to a joyous market with people buying the makings of Christmas dinner and to celebrations of Christmas in a miner's cottage and in a lighthouse. Scrooge and the ghost also visit Fred's Christmas party. A major part of this stave is taken up with Bob Cratchit's family feast and introduces his youngest son Tiny Tim, who is seriously ill. The spirit informs Scrooge that Tiny Tim will die unless the course of events changes. Before disappearing, the spirit shows Scrooge two hideous, emaciated children named Ignorance and Want. He tells Scrooge to beware the former above all and mocks Scrooge's concern for their welfare. A short, heavily-edited dance number demonstrates what the two children might become; Ignorance, a street fighter, and Want, a prostitute.

The third spirit, the Ghost of Christmas Yet to Come, shows Scrooge a Christmas Day in the future. The silent ghost reveals scenes involving the death of a disliked man whose funeral is attended by local businessmen only on condition that lunch is provided. His charwoman, laundress and the local undertaker steal his possessions to sell to a fence. When he asks the spirit to show a single person who feels emotion over his death, he is only given the pleasure of a poor couple who rejoice that his death gives them more time to put their finances in order. When Scrooge asks to see tenderness connected with any death, the ghost shows him Bob Cratchit and his family mourning the death of Tiny Tim. The ghost then allows Scrooge to see a neglected grave, with a tombstone bearing Scrooge's name. Sobbing, Scrooge pledges to change his ways.

Scrooge awakens on Christmas morning a changed man. He makes a large donation to the charity he rejected the previous day, anonymously sends a large turkey to the Cratchit home for Christmas dinner and spends the afternoon with Fred's family. The following day he gives Cratchit an increase in pay, and begins to become a father figure to Tiny Tim. From then on, Scrooge treats everyone with kindness, generosity and compassion, embodying the spirit of Christmas.

Emily is delighted by the performance and the grandmother finishes her narration.

== Cast ==
- Siân Phillips as Grandmother/Narrator
- Thea Achillea as Emily
- Michael Nunn as Ebenezer Scrooge
  - Simon Russell Beale as the voice of Ebenezer Scrooge
- Grace Jabbari as Belle
  - Carey Mulligan as the voice of Belle
- Brekke Fagerlund Karl as Bob Cratchit/The Ghost of Christmas Yet to Come
  - Martin Freeman as the voice of Bob Cratchit
- Mikey Boateng as The Ghost of Christmas Present
  - Daniel Kaluuya as the voice of The Ghost of Christmas Present
- Russell Maliphant as Marley's Ghost
  - Andy Serkis as the voice of Marley's Ghost
- Dana Maliphant as The Ghost of Christmas Past
  - Leslie Caron as the voice of The Ghost of Christmas Past
- Danil Golovam as Tiny Tim
  - Archie Durrant as the voice of Tiny Tim
- Simone Donati as Fred
  - Oliver John Lock as Fred's voice
- Faith Prendergast as Martha
  - Sydney Craven as the voice of Martha
- Elleanor Perry as Sarah
  - Sarah Schoenbeck as Sarah's voice
- Robert Cotton as Father
- Georgina Sutcliffe as Mother
- Andrej Kaminsky as Dancer

== Release ==
The film was released theatrically in the United Kingdom on 20 November 2020. It was also released theatrically in the United States on 4 December 2020.

== Reception ==
On the review aggregator website Rotten Tomatoes, 58% of 12 critics' reviews are positive, with an average rating of 6.2/10.

Tracey Petherick of Common Sense Media awarded the film four stars out of five, calling it "creepy in places, bleak in others, but the overall takeaway is an elegant, dynamic, and ultimately uplifting festive treat." Martin Unsworth of Starburst wrote, "It's a tale that has been retold numerous times to varying effect. This adaptation utilises Charles Dickens' original text as a spoken story over a dazzling ballet-esque depiction of the ultimate Yuletide story."

Stephen Dalton of The Hollywood Reporter gave the film a negative review, calling it "Technically impressive but dramatically flat." The Timess Kevin Maher gave it 2/5 stars, saying it "mash[es] together a wholesome kids' movie with an underwhelming ballet, a low-fi cartoon and a curious overdub featuring famous actors lending their voices to the dancers."

== See also ==
- List of Christmas films
- Adaptations of A Christmas Carol
