= Georg Wilhelm Franz Wenderoth =

German botanist (1774-1861)

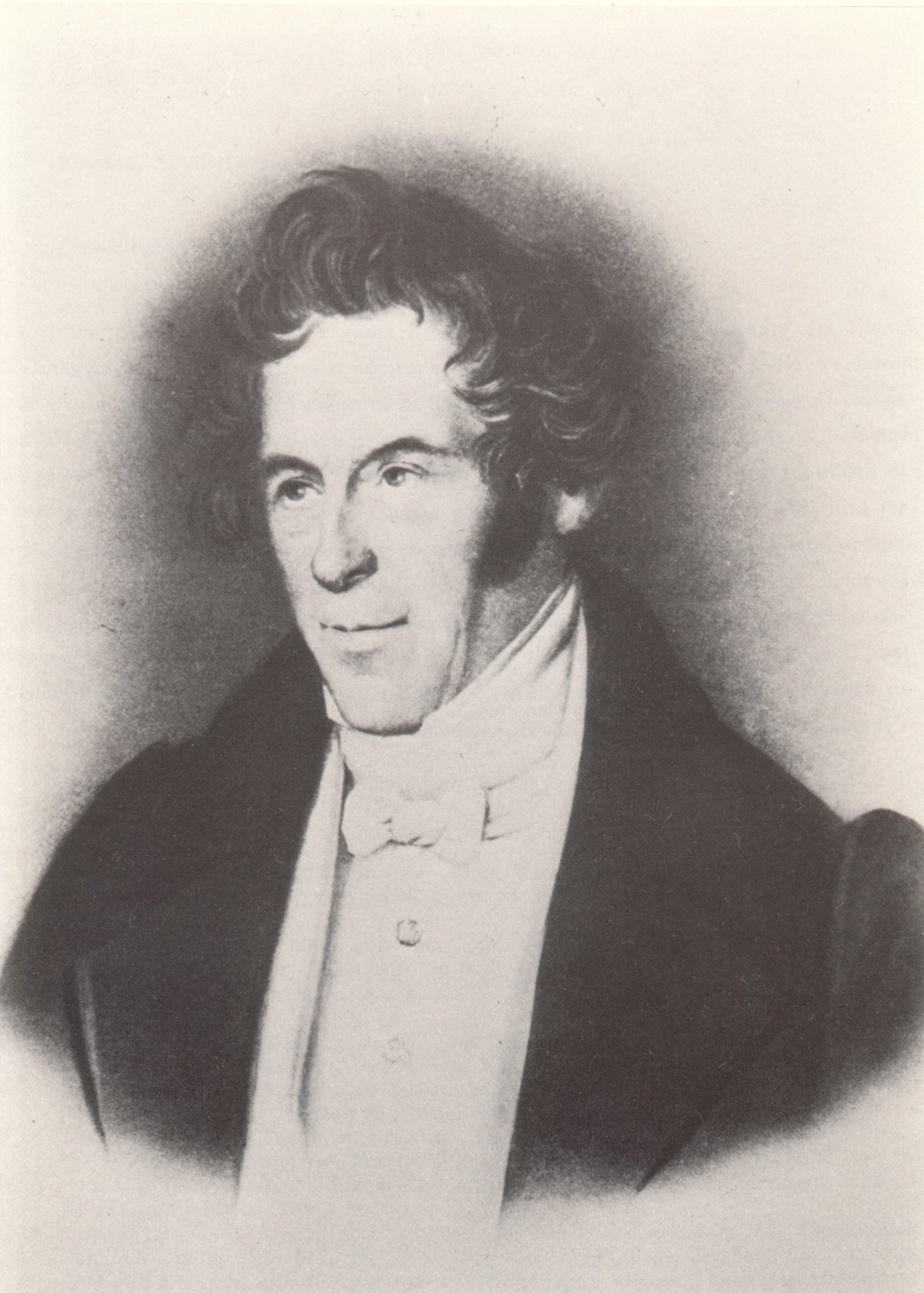
Georg Wilhelm Franz Wenderoth (1774–1861)

Georg Wilhelm Franz Wenderoth (17 January 1774, Marburg – 5 June 1861) was a German pharmacist and botanist.

Initially trained as a pharmacist, he was employed for a few years at the Rathsapotheke in Schweinfurt, where his free time was spent on botanical excursions in the vicinity of the city. From 1796 he studied medicine and natural sciences at the University of Marburg, obtaining his habilitation in pharmacology and botany in 1806. Afterwards, he taught classes in physics, chemistry and botany at Rinteln. In 1810 he returned to Marburg as a professor of botany, distinguishing himself with work done at the Alter Botanischer Garten Marburg.

The botanical genus Wenderothia is named in his honor by Diederich Franz Leonhard von Schlechtendal (1794–1866).

== Principal writings ==
- Lehrbuch der Botanik zu Vorlesungen un zum Selbststudium, 1821.
- Flora Hassiaca : oder systematische Verzeichniss aller bis jetzt in Kurhessen ... beobachteten Pflanzen, enthaltend die offen blühenden Gewächse, 1846.
- Die pflanzen botanischer gärten, zunächst die des pflanzengartens der Universität Marburg, unter ihren catalognummern systematisch aufgefürt und synoptisch beschrieben, 1851.
