= Kleo =

German action-thriller television series

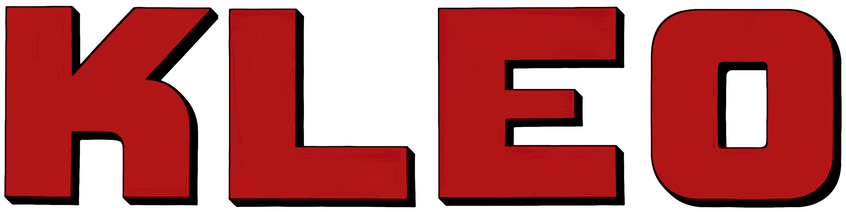
- Genre: Action; Thriller; Dark-comedy
- Created by: Hanno Hackfort; Richard Kropf; Bob Konrad
- Written by: Hanno Hackfort; Richard Kropf; Bob Konrad; Elena Senft
- Directed by: Viviane Andereggen; Jano Ben Chaabane
- Starring: Jella Haase; Dimitrij Schaad; Julius Feldmeier; Vladimir Burlakov; Vincent Redetzki; Yun Huang; Alessija Lause; Andrej Kaminsky
- Music by: Johnny Klimek; Justin Bell; Gene Pritsker
- Original language: German (Note: With some dialogue in English, Spanish, Russian and Serbian)
- No. of seasons: 2
- No. of episodes: 14

Production
- Executive producers: Hanno Hackfort; Richard Kropf; Bob Konrad; Elena Senft; Michael Souvignier; Till Derenbach
- Production locations: Berlin, Germany; Eisenhüttenstadt, Germany; Mallorca, Spain; Belgrade, Serbia
- Cinematography: Martin Langer; Tobias Koppe
- Editors: Constantin Von Seld; Piet Schmelz; Katja Fischer; Felix Rudek
- Running time: 48–60 minutes
- Production companies: Candy Shop Productions; Zeitsprung Pictures

Original release
- Network: Netflix
- Release: 19 August 2022 – present

Kleo is a German action-thriller comedy television series co-created by Hanno Hackfort, Richard Kropf, and Bob Konrad for Netflix, premiering in 2022. It follows the revenge journey of a former East German Stasi assassin, Kleo Straub (Jella Haase), after her arrest and subsequent imprisonment until the fall of the Berlin Wall.

It premiered on Netflix on 19 August 2022, with the second season released on 25 July 2024.

== Synopsis ==
In 1987, after successfully assassinating a double agent in a West Berlin club, East German Stasi assassin Kleo Straub is falsely imprisoned by her agency. When she is released after the Berlin Wall is taken down in 1989, she plans her revenge on the conspirators who framed her. Meanwhile, Sven Petzold, an underappreciated fraud policeman who witnessed the 1987 murder, finds connections between it and Straub, leading him to impede her vengeance quest.

== Cast ==
- Jella Haase as Kleo Straub, an unofficial East German Stasi assassin who was imprisoned for an alleged act of treason
  - Rosa Wirtz plays a younger version of her.
- Dimitrij Schaad as Sven Petzold, an underachieving West Berlin police officer who initially worked in the fraud section
- Julius Feldmeier as Thilo, current occupant of Kleo's old apartment who came from West Germany
- Vincent Redetzki as Uwe Mittig, an unofficial East German Stasi agent who was an accomplice of Kleo's during her 1987 mission
- Vladimir Burlakov as Andi Wolf, a former East German Stasi supervisor who was romantically involved with Kleo
- Marta Sroka as Anja, Wolf's spouse who is pregnant with his child
- Jürgen Heinrich as Otto Straub, an East German Stasi general commander and Kleo's grandfather
- Alessija Lause as Anne Geike, a West German BND officer who previously met Otto Straub
- Andrej Kaminsky as Nikolai Zhukov, a Soviet KGB officer based in Germany with a connection with Kleo

=== Recurring ===
- Steffi Kühnert as Margot Honecker, the wife of East German leader Erich Honecker and a high-ranking communist party official in her own right, who is Kleo's aunt
- Thandi Sebe as Jenny Schneider, Sven's wife who becomes emotionally distant from him
- Taner Sahintürk as Frederick "Freddy" Lembach, Sven's friend and colleague in the police
- Yun Huang as Min Sun, a BND officer of Chinese origin who works under Anne Geike
- Zethphan Smith-Gneist as Mark Petzold, Sven and Jenny's teenage son
- Alexander Hörbe as Ludger Wieczorek, a former East German colonel who was in charge of Kleo's 1987 mission
- Rodrigo Rojo as Jorge Gonzalez, a Stasi agent who immigrated from Chile
- Gunnar Helm as Erich Mielke, the head of the Stasi who is involved in Kleo's imprisonment
- Anna Stieblich as Brigitte Straub, Kleo's mother who abandoned her for West Germany
- Garry Fischmann as Matthias Frey, a man Kleo assassinated in West Berlin on 1987, setting the stage for her predicament
- Jonas Stenzel as Dopi, Thilo's friend who is a techno music DJ
- Robin Gooch as Rose Carmichael, a CIA agent
- Alli Neumann as Ciana, Thilo's friend whom he met in a techno club

=== Guest starring ===
- Harry Schäfer as Alexander Belov, a Soviet KGB agent who has made a deal with Wieczorek
- Kathrin Angerer as Gabriela Wieczorek, Ludger's wife, who resides in Mallorca after faking their deaths
- Bruno F. Apitz as Walter Blum, East German Party secretary and a close friend of Wieczorek's who knows his whereabouts
- Lina Wendel as Ms. Lobrecht, Mielke's secretary, who has been assigned with the protection of a red briefcase
- Anselm Bresgott as Holger, Kleo's childhood friend and former love interest
  - Jakob Albert plays a younger version of him
- Thiago Braga de Oliveira as a concierge in Hotel Carrera

Show creators Richard Kropf and Hanno Hackfort also have cameo roles.

=== English dub ===
The English version was produced by Liquid Violet in London. Ed Hughes was responsible for adapting the script and directing the dub.

Role	Actor	Voice actor
Kleo Straub	Jella Haase; Rosa Wirtz (young)	Anna Rust; Julieta Lyons (young)
Sven Petzold	Dimitrij Schaad	Stephen Campbell Moore
Thilo	Julius Feldmeier	Alexander Arnold
Uwe Mittig	Vincent Redetzki	Rory Alexander
Andi Wolf	Vladimir Burlakov	Jeremy Neumark Jones
Anja	Marta Sroka	Charlotte Gray
Otto Straub	Jürgen Heinrich	Rupert Vansittart
Walter Blum	Bruno F. Apitz	Rupert Vansittart
Anne Geike	Alessija Lause	Julia Brahms
Nikolai Zhukov	Andrej Kaminsky	Branko Tomovic
Margot Honecker	Steffi Kühnert	Clare Corbett
Jenny Schneider	Thandi Sebe	Natasha Gordon
Frederick "Freddy" Lembach	Taner Sahintürk	Mathew McQuinn
Min Sun	Yun Huang	Molly Harris
Mark Petzold	Zethphan Smith-Gneist	Matthew Jacobs Morgan
Ludger Wieczorek	Alexander Hörbe	William Gaminara
Jorge Gonzalez	Rodrigo Rojo	Alvaro Flores
Erich Mielke	Gunnar Helm	David Holt
Brigitte Straub	Anna Stieblich	Kara Tointon; Margaret Ashley
Rose Carmichael	Robin Gooch	Robin Gooch
Ciana	Alli Neumann	Kristin Atherton
Alexander Belov	Harry Schäfer	Ed Hughes
Holger	Anselm Bresgott; Jakob Albert (young)	Mathew McQuinn; Tom Moloney (young)

== Episodes ==
Series	Episodes	Originally released
1	8	19 August 2022
2	6	25 July 2024

=== Season 1 (2022) ===
No. overall	No. in season	Title	Directed by	Written by	Original release date
1	1	"Big Eden" "Big Eden"	Viviane Andereggen	Richard Kropf	19 August 2022
In 1987, Kleo Jennifer Straub, an East German Stasi agent, kills an unknown man during a mission in a West Berlin nightclub called Big Eden. Sven Petzold, a police officer, witnesses the murder and reports it, only to be ignored while the case is quietly shelved. After her mission, Kleo celebrates with her supervisor and boyfriend, Andi Wolf, and reveals that she is pregnant with his child and intends to retire. However, she is framed and imprisoned for passing intelligence to a foreign agent and most of her comrades, including her grandfather, Stasi general Otto Straub, testify against her. While imprisoned, Kleo is severely injured by inmates, resulting in a miscarriage and subsequent permanent infertility. In May 1990, Kleo is freed as a part of general amnesty granted by the GDR after the Fall of the Berlin Wall. She soon visits her old apartment, now occupied by Thilo, a West German techno music enthusiast, to retrieve her belongings and weapons. She then proceeds to kill the judge who ordered her imprisonment and find clues as to why she was set up. She later visits Otto's house and plays his testimony on a tape player. Upon his arrival Kleo confronts him, whereupon he claims that he had no other choice. He attempts to shoot her, but Kleo kills him and buries him in his garden. Sven rediscovers the cold case file involving Kleo. In Chile, two unknown men exchange a red briefcase, with one of them insisting it be hidden from Kleo.
2	2	"The Reunion" "Das Wiedersehen"	Viviane Andereggen	Bob Konrad	19 August 2022
Using a false identity, Kleo tracks Andi and is met at his apartment by his pregnant spouse Anja. Andi notices Kleo and tries to pursue her, only to be pinned down and interrogated by her. Andi claims Ludger Wieczorek, their commanding officer, is responsible for Kleo's betrayal and tells her that he had died in a car crash. Meanwhile, Sven, after reading Kleo's file, launches his own investigation, visits her old apartment, and talks with Thilo. Seeking more answers, Kleo infiltrates Stasi headquarters and finds evidence that Wieczorek is still alive. Sven also goes to Stasi headquarters to investigate, only to find Kleo as she leaves the premises. He then tails her to Otto's house, which he breaks into to find more clues. Kleo then infiltrates the apartment of Walter Blum, a close comrade of Wieczorek, murdering him and acquiring Wieczorek's location in Mallorca to kill him next. Kleo later notices Sven's business card in Thilo's pants and visits the Petzold household, warning Sven to not interfere. Meanwhile, Uwe Mittig, one of Kleo's comrades during the Big Eden assassination, is given the order to assassinate Kleo, to which he complies.
3	3	"Snow in Sóller" "Schnee in Sóller"	Viviane Andereggen	Hanno Hackfort	19 August 2022
Kleo travels to Mallorca and starts to inquire about Wieczorek's activities, later discovering that he has assumed a new identity. Kleo then calls Thilo, already blackmailed by Sven to reveal her whereabouts, before hanging up when Thilo discreetly tells her they are being eavesdropped. Later, Kleo is ambushed by Alexander Belov, a KGB agent who made illegal deals with Wieczorek. Kleo, however, manages to overpower Belov before forcing him to leak information regarding Wieczorek's dealings with him and make a deal with her. Meanwhile, Sven figures out Kleo's whereabouts and flies to Mallorca under the pretense of police work, tracking Kleo's activities. Kleo infiltrates the Wieczorek residence under a false identity and gathers information regarding him while rigging his tuxedo with explosives. Wieczorek then invites Kleo to a party. Sven catches up to Kleo, warning her that he will stop her, but Kleo frames him instead for drug dealing. At the party, Kleo poisons Ludger's wife Gabriela and makes him reveal the truth of her arrest in exchange for an antidote, revealing Stasi Minister Erich Mielke's involvement. Kleo later kills Ludger with the rigged tuxedo in front of his wife before cashing out Gabriela's bank account. Uwe later arrives at Ludger's residence and kills Gabriela. Belov makes an anonymous report to the BND, implicating Kleo.
4	4	"The Minister" "Der Minister"	Jano Ben Chaabane	Elena Senft	19 August 2022
Kleo sneaks into Andi's apartment, informing him of Wieczorek's assassination and her next target, Erich Mielke, in custody in Hohenschönhausen Prison. Sven, who is bailed out by his superior, laments his failure to arrest Kleo to his friend, Freddy Lembech, who accidentally gives Sven a clue involving Kleo's next target. After a reprimand from his superior, Sven quits his job to pursue Kleo. Min Sun, who receives Belov's report at the BND, informs her superior, Anne Geike, regarding the report. Geike then assigns Min with the Big Eden case. Kleo goes to Hohenschönhausen in an attempt to assassinate Mielke, only to be thwarted by Sven through a wanted poster he put there earlier. Kleo soon tries to kill Sven by setting up a booby-trap in his garage. She later poisons Mielke before visiting him in the hospital, masquerading as a nurse and giving the doctors a medical report to keep him from dying. Unaware that his life is in danger, Sven, who opts to share a ride with Freddy instead, tracks Kleo before choosing to pursue Uwe, who is also monitoring her, to his warehouse. Sven and Freddy monitor Uwe briefly before he leaves, with Sven entering the warehouse afterwards. Sven is then approached by Min, who is also tracking him, offering him a position in the BND should he manage to capture Kleo. Kleo enters Erich's hospital room and forces him to tell her who were responsible for her arrest. Mielke reveals that Otto Straub had pulled the strings but tries to choke her before Kleo shoots him. Kleo digs up Otto's grave and finds a message revealing that she killed a West German agent who had information that could threaten the existence of the GDR. In despair, Kleo meets with Andi, before telling him she killed her grandfather. Andi, who is infuriated by Mielke's assassination, soothes her and tries to convince her to go in hiding, which she refuses. Andi then visits Uwe and authorizes him to eliminate Kleo.
5	5	"Uwe" "Uwe"	Jano Ben Chaabane	Elena Senft	19 August 2022
Kleo rushes to Sven's garage and narrowly saves him from her booby-trap in exchange for his help. Later, Kleo is visited by Anne, who was expecting her grandfather to answer. Kleo, seeing Anne's BND card, questions her connection to Otto but Anne abruptly leaves. Uwe visits Otto's house at night, failing to kill Kleo before taking Thilo away as a hostage. Meanwhile, Sven and Freddy acquire some knowledge of Kleo's target in 1987 and learn of a red briefcase that was constantly carried by the victim. Min then tells Sven to get the briefcase instead in return for his position in the BND. Kleo eventually frees Thilo with Andi's help before approaching Sven for information. Their exchange is interrupted by his wife, Jenny, who calls the police before Sven defuses the situation. Infuriated by Sven, Jenny evicts him from their house, forcing him to move to Otto's house. Kleo sets up an appointment with Uwe in exchange for information on her case. However, Andi unsuccessfully tries to kill her with a sniper rifle. Kleo then flees before being shot by Uwe. As Uwe is about to finish her off, a gunshot is heard as the screen fades to black.
6	6	"Object Else" "Objekt Else"	Jano Ben Chaabane	Hanno Hackfort	19 August 2022
Sven shoots Uwe just as he is about to kill Kleo, who becomes unconscious from her wounds. While unconscious, Kleo reminisces her childhood under the care of her mother, Brigitte, alongside Otto. Kleo vaguely remembers her mother's argument with her grandfather before he took full custody of her. Otto tells her that her mother abandoned her and defected to West Germany, where she later died. Otto eventually enrolls her in an FDJ school while she develops a long romantic relationship with her childhood friend, Holger before Otto orders her to cut ties with him for being a class enemy. Kleo then has a brief relationship with Chilean refugee Jorge Gonzalez, before joining the Stasi as an agent, where she meets Uwe and Andi during her training. She then goes on to assassinate several figures to impress her grandfather. As she receives a medal, Kleo notices the target she murdered and a woman who carried a red briefcase before she wakes up. Kleo then informs Sven, that the two individuals are Mielke's aide, Matthias Frey, whom she had killed in 1987, and secretary, Ms. Lobrecht. Kleo and Sven drive to Mielke's funeral where Kleo meets with Margot Honecker, her aunt, while Sven exchanges information with Min. They subsequently tail Ms. Lobrecht, to her house where she commits suicide to protect the briefcase and also because of Sven's condescending statements on the GDR. Kleo however, soon finds the briefcase, but finds out that someone else has swapped its contents. Sven later notices Andi in Kleo's photo, naming him as Uwe's accomplice he saw earlier, to Kleo's surprise.
7	7	"The Snipe and The Clam" "Schnepfe und Miesmuschel"	Jano Ben Chaabane	Bob Konrad	19 August 2022
Kleo and Sven barge into Andi's apartment, with Kleo shooting Andi in the shoulder. Andi then proceeds to tell Kleo that the red briefcase contains several classified documents and Matthias had attempted to sell its contents to the BND. Andi also tells her that Frey's efforts failed when a double agent reported him to the GDR beforehand, with the GDR sending Kleo to assassinate him in response. Before Andi tells her any further details, Anja shoots him in the head, revealing herself as Ramona Brandt, a legendary Stasi agent who had been assigned to keep an eye on Andi after Kleo's arrest. Holding Sven hostage, Ramona orders Kleo to drop her gun, before letting them go and leaving. Kleo and Sven, and separately Min, find out that Anne was the double agent. Before Kleo and Sven leave to track down Anne in West Germany, they are interrupted by Jenny, who reveals her affair with Freddy in front of their son, Mark, who greets Kleo, whom he had met earlier. Anne is confronted by Kleo and Sven in her house as she burns compromising evidence. After injuring Sven, Anne engages Kleo in an intense fight, with Anne accidentally dying after falling into her fireplace. Afterwards, Sven and Kleo figure out that Jorge is also involved with the red briefcase, and go to Santiago. Min later enters Anne's house and discovers her body and CCTV footage of Anne's altercation with Kleo and Sven. Meanwhile, Ramona, who is also in Santiago, receives the red briefcase's coordinates from Margot along with orders to kill Kleo.
8	8	"The Purple Witch" "Die Iila Hexe"	Viviane Andereggen	Richard Kropf	19 August 2022
Kleo and Sven arrive at Santiago and go to Jorge's house, only to be told that he is dead. Kleo, however, sees through the ruse and finds Jorge. Kleo demands the location of the briefcase but is strangled by his aide Carmen as he escapes. Outside, Sven chases Jorge before distracting him long enough to be accidentally run over. Meanwhile, Ramona arranges for a meeting with Kleo, who manages to kill Carmen, at a bar. Kleo instructs Sven to go to Ramona's hotel room and find the briefcase's location, which he does. At the bar, Kleo interrogates Ramona before realizing she had been poisoned with TTX by Ramona upon entry as Ramona leaves Kleo to die. Sven arrives and saves Kleo by injecting her with dopamine. Sven and Kleo race with Ramona on their way to the briefcase. Ramona eventually corners the two before her water breaks. Kleo, who decides to help her, successfully delivers the baby. Overjoyed, Ramona abandons her mission, allowing Kleo and Sven to retrieve the briefcase. After reading the contents, Kleo and Sven are visited by Margot, who confirms the documents contained an agreement between US President Ronald Reagan and her husband, East German leader Erich Honecker, that arranged for the United States giving financial aid to the GDR to keep it stable enough to justify the existence of the two Germanies and Washington's Cold War policy, and reveals that Mielke had blackmailed Honecker with the papers before Frey stole it. Margot demands Kleo and Sven return the briefcase to her in exchange for Brigitte's whereabouts, revealing that Otto had her imprisoned before West Germany bailed her out. Despite Sven's objections, Kleo chooses to return the briefcase. Kleo and Sven fly to West Berlin, heading to Brigitte's house. Kleo meets Brigitte, only to be told that she does not want Kleo back into her life, despite telling Kleo how hard it is to be apart from her. Sven and Kleo later return to Otto's house and have sex. The next day, Kleo wakes up regretting returning the briefcase to Margot only for Sven to reveal that he had called the BND about the briefcase. Kleo angrily chases Sven with a gun. In the epilogue, Min, who had swapped the briefcase with an identical one containing toilet paper while Margot was in transit, gives the briefcase to a CIA agent, while Ramona breastfeeds her newborn baby by the roadside in Chile. In Berlin, Uwe is shown to have survived and plots his revenge.

=== Season 2 (2024) ===
No. overall	No. in season	Title	Directed by	Written by	Original release date
9	1	"The Seahorse" "Das Seepferd"	Isabel Braak	Bob Konrad	25 July 2024
The car carrying the red briefcase is waylaid at the Olympiastadion by a female agent, who kills those transporting it before blowing up the vehicle. At her home, Kleo is visited by her mother, who explains that she was under surveillance when they last met and has been in hiding. After learning of the briefcase's disappearance, Kleo goes to the Olympiastadion and is accosted by CIA agent Rose Carmichael, who reveals that she is spying on her mother. Sven also learns of the disappearance and seeks out Min Sun, only to be told by Rose that she had been eliminated as part of a coverup regarding the briefcase. Rose offers to help Sven in exchange for betraying Kleo, which he refuses. Kleo goes to the Honeckers and is met by Uwe and Margot, who denies any role in the disappearance. She later begins experiencing flashbacks of her childhood. Thilo moves in into Kleo's house with his new girlfriend Ciana. Later that evening, Sven visits Kleo, who refuses his help. Shortly afterwards, she receives a KGB agent named Nikolai, who drops off a seahorse necklace that was taken away from her as a child.
10	2	"Object Moni" "Objekt Moni"	Isabel Braak	Katharina Sophie Brauer	25 July 2024
11	3	"The Bear" "Der Bär"	Nina Vukovic	Hanno Hackfort	25 July 2024
12	4	"Beer and Schnapps" "Molle und Korn"	Isabel Braak	Katharina Sophie Brauer	25 July 2024
13	5	"From Russia with Love" "Liebesgrüße aus Moskau"	Isabel Braak	Hanno Hackfort	25 July 2024
14	6	"Harald" "Harald"	Nina Vukovic	Bob Konrad	25 July 2024

== Production ==
=== Development ===
On 8 February 2022, Netflix ordered Kleo as a part of 19 German-language productions worth US$571 million. Hanno Hackfort, Richard Kropf and Bob Konrad, co-creators of 4 Blocks, were revealed as series creators, writers and executive producers, with Elena Senft set to co-write. Michael Souvigner and Till Derenbach of Zeitsprung Pictures were also announced as co-producers, while Viviane Andereggen and Jano Ben Chaabane were signed as directors. The series was renewed on 29 September 2022. Series two was released on Netflix on 25 July 2024.

=== Casting ===
Upon the series announcement on 8 February 2022, Jella Haase was announced as the eponymus lead of the series.

=== Filming ===
Principal photography for the series reportedly began in June 2021, with Berlin, Eisenhüttenstadt, and Mallorca revealed as filming locations. In the second series Berlin and Belgrade were used as filming locations.

== Release ==
The series' first official trailer was launched on YouTube on 14 July 2022. Kleo premiered worldwide on 19 August 2022, and was renewed for a second season on 29 September 2022.

The second season was released on 25 July 2024.

== Reception ==
The first season of Kleo received positive reviews from critics. On the review aggregator website Rotten Tomatoes, 100% of 10 critics' reviews are positive, with an average rating of 7.3/10. Rebecca Nicholson of The Guardian rated the series 3/5 stars, criticizing its similarity with Killing Eve, but praised its casting, characterization, screenplay and pacing, calling it "nevertheless an entertaining, highly stylized and cinematic adventure". Maria Hunstig of Vogue Germany praised the casting, screenplay and pacing, calling it "fast, hard, and incredibly entertaining". Joel Keller of Decider similarly praised its pacing and acting, particularly lauding Haase's performance. Stephen King also praised the series, calling it "a breath of fresh air—suspenseful and also very funny". Historian Katja Hoyer said that Kleo evoked a new curiosity in East Germany through Ostalgie motives.

=== Accolades ===
Year	Award	Category	Nominee(s)	Results	Ref.
2023	Romy	Most Popular Actress Series	Jella Haase	Won	
2023	Romy	Best Screenplay	Elena Senft, Hanno Hackfort, Richard Kropf and Bob Konrad	Nominated	
2023	Grimme-Preis	Best book fiction	Elena Senft, Hanno Hackfort, Richard Kropf and Bob Konrad	Won	
2023	Grimme-Preis	Best Director's Fiction	Viviane Andereggen and Jano Ben Chabaane	Won	
2023	Grimme-Preis	Best Actress	Jella Haase	Won	
2023	Jupiter Award	Best Actress	Jella Haase	Won	
2023	Deutscher Schauspielpreis 2023	Best Supporting Role	Vincent Redetzki	Nominated	
2023	Deutscher Schauspielpreis 2023	Best Comedic Role	Julius Feldmeier	Nominated	
2023	Deutscher Schauspielpreis 2023	Best Duo	Jella Haase and Dimitrij Schaad	Won	
2023	Critics' Choice Television Awards	Best Foreign Language Series	Kleo season 1	Nominated	
2023	Bavarian TV Awards	Audience Award: Best Series	Kleo season 1	Nominated	
2023	Bavarian TV Awards	Best Actress	Jella Haase	Nominated	
2023	Bavarian TV Awards	Best Actor	Dimitrij Schaad	Nominated	
2023	Deutscher Fernsehpreis	Best Drama Series	Kleo season 1	Won	
2023	Deutscher Fernsehpreis	Best Actress	Jella Haase	Won	
2023	Deutscher Fernsehpreis	Best book fiction	Elena Senft, Hanno Hackfort, Richard Kropf and Bob Konrad	Nominated	
2023	Deutscher Fernsehpreis	Best Director's Fiction	Viviane Andereggen and Jano Ben Chabaane	Nominated	
