= Andrej Kaminsky =

German actor (born 1964)

- Born: January 5, 1964 (age 62); Helsinki, Finland
- Education: Ernst Busch Academy of Dramatic Arts
- Occupations: Actor; director
- Years active: 1989–present

Andrej Kaminsky (born 1964) is a German actor and director of stage and screen.

== Career ==
The son of a German father and a Russian mother, he was born in Helsinki before moving to Berlin during his childhood. Kaminsky grew in Berlin and graduated in 1989 from the Ernst Busch Academy of Dramatic Arts. In 1992 he also received musical training.

He debuted in 1989 in the Rudolstadt theater, which he followed with a prolific career in Frankfurt, the Berliner Ensemble, Nordhausen, Sondershausen and Kassel. The same year he also debuted in television, appearing in popular series Polizeiruf 110 before diversifying as an occasional guest in television and film.

In 2000 he founded the stage and music group Harmonisch & Co., dedicated to social work with children, disabled and prison inmates. Since 2005 he is a drama teacher in the Ernst Busch Academy and the University of Film in Babelsberg, and since 2017 he is a member of the Augsburg theater. In 2018, he performed in Antje Thoms' production of Georg Kaiser's Gas trilogy, commended by Frankfurter Allgemeine Zeitung for the sensitivity with which he portrayed the broken billionare in Coral as well as the engineer frustrated with utopias in Gas.

He debuted in YouTube in 2016 as part of the Grim Hustle channel, produced by television and film veteran Felix Charin, where Kaminsky played a Russian mafia boss named Andrycha starring in a short personal development lecture. In May 2022 he became the main attraction of the channel, delivering continuous advice under the character of the ruthless yet honorable crime lord. The channel became the public voice of the real life Grim Foundation, co-founded by Kaminsky. Kaminsky played again Russian mafia members in the films John Wick: Chapter 4 and A Working Man between 2023 and 2025.

== Filmography ==
=== Film ===
Year	Title	Role	Notes
1989	Polizeiruf 110: Drei Flaschen Tokajer	Siegfried Muller	
2001	Enemy at the Gates	Russian officer	
2012	Europas Letzer Sommer	Sergejus	
2015	The People vs. Fritz Bauer	Police officer	
2015	Das Gestandnis	Steiner	
2018	Atlas	Correction officer	
2020	A Christmas Carol	Dancer	
2023	Der Zeuge	N.º 38	
2023	John Wick: Chapter 4	Orthodox priest	
2025	A Working Man	Symon Kharchenko	

=== Television ===
Year	Title	Role	Notes
1989	Johanna	Biker	
1991	Großstadtrevier	Das schwarze Schaf	
2007	Alle Alle	Joschka	
2010	Der Kriminalist	Superintendent	
2012	Tatort	Klaus Mohr	
2012	Ein starkes Team	Jakutow	
2016	SOKO Köln	Prosecutor Wolter	
2016	Alles was zählt	Andrej	
2017	SOKO Leipzig	Walter Klopek/Andrei Maximow	
2018	Tatverdach	Milan Vukovic	
2020	Schwester, Schwester	Mr. Sobolew	
2021	Hubert ohne Staller	Fake attorney	
2021	Zimmer mit Stall	Koszneouw	
2024	Kleo	Nikolai Zhukov	
