= Metropol-Theater (Munich) =

Theatre in Munich, Germany

Coordinates: 48°11′32″N 11°37′09″E

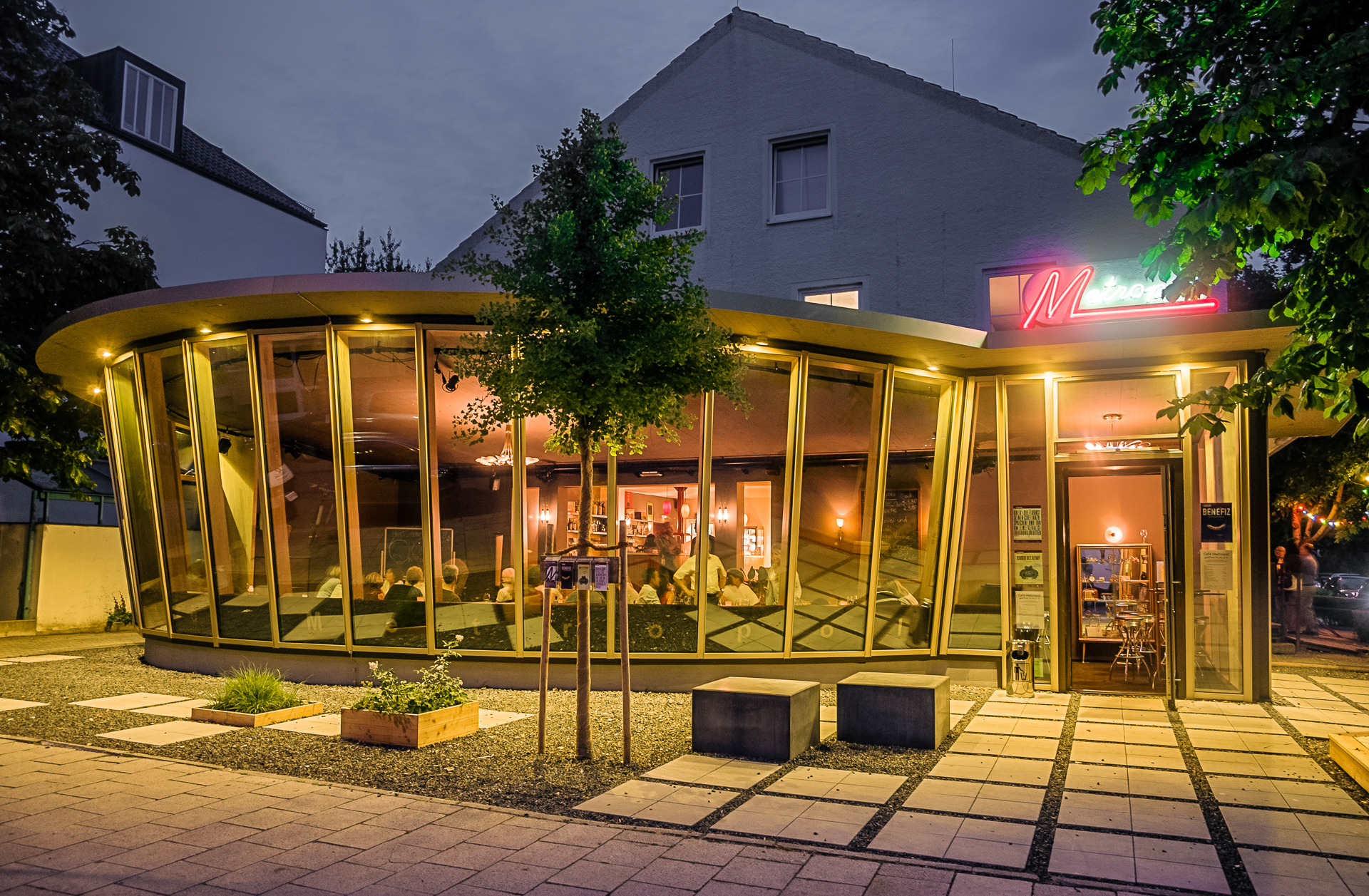
An image of Metropol-Theater (Munich)

Metropol-Theater is a theatre in Munich, Bavaria, Germany.
