= Botanischer Garten Marburg =

Botanical garden in Germany

Coordinates: 50°48′11″N 8°48′34″E

- Neuer Botanischer Garten Marburg
- Interactive map of Botanischer Garten Marburg
- Type: Botanical garden
- Location: Karl-von-Frisch-Straße, Marburg, Hesse, Germany
- Area: 20 hectares (49 acres)
- Established: 1977
- Operated by: University of Marburg
- Open: Daily (admission fee charged)

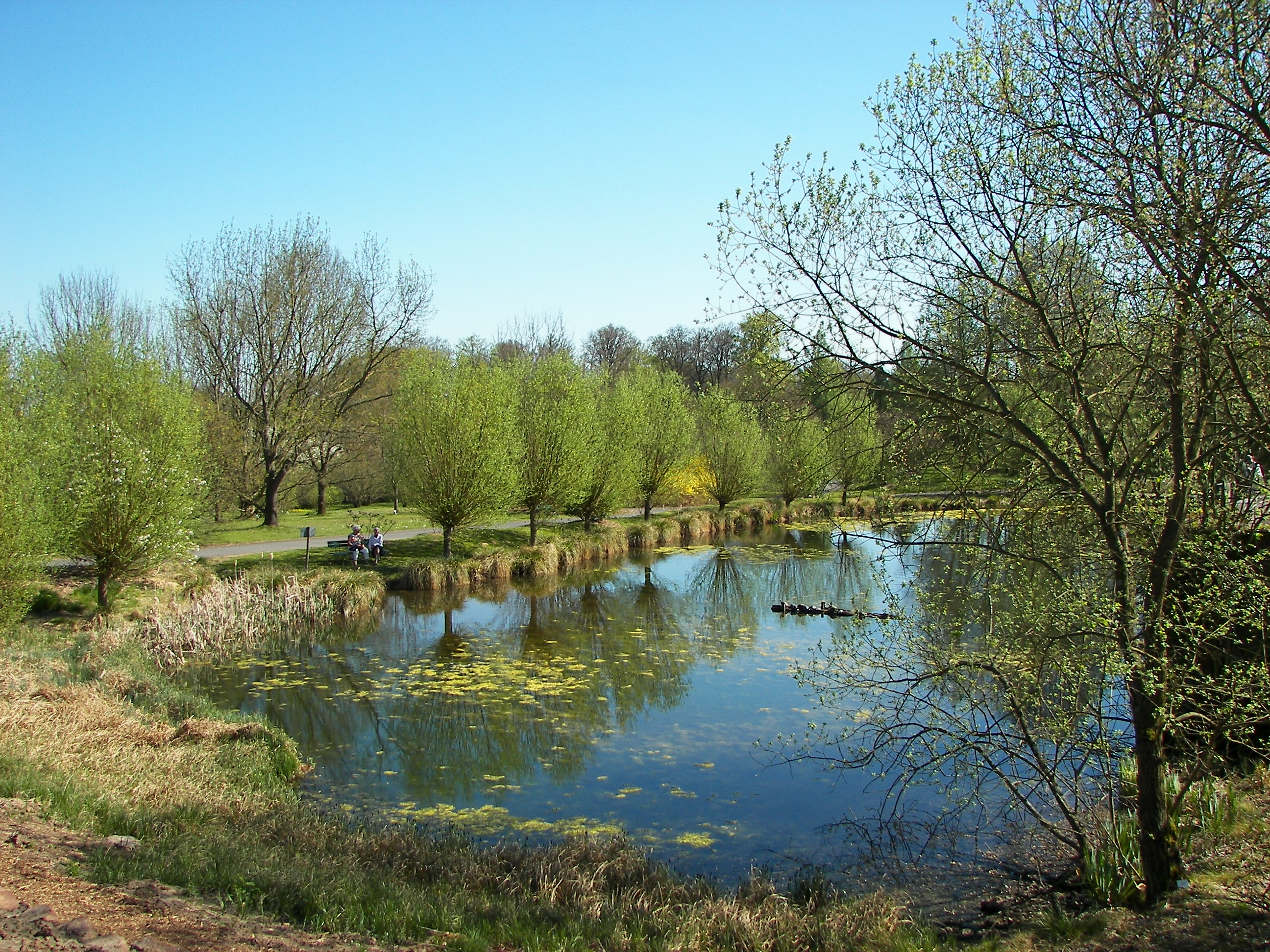
Botanischer Garten Marburg

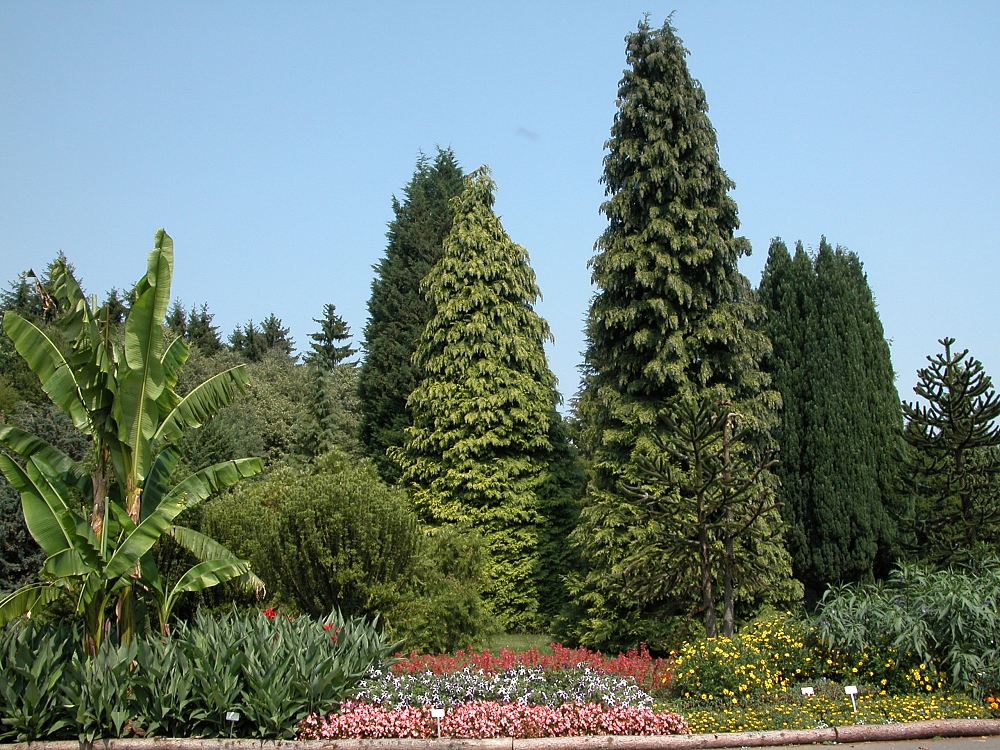
Arboretum

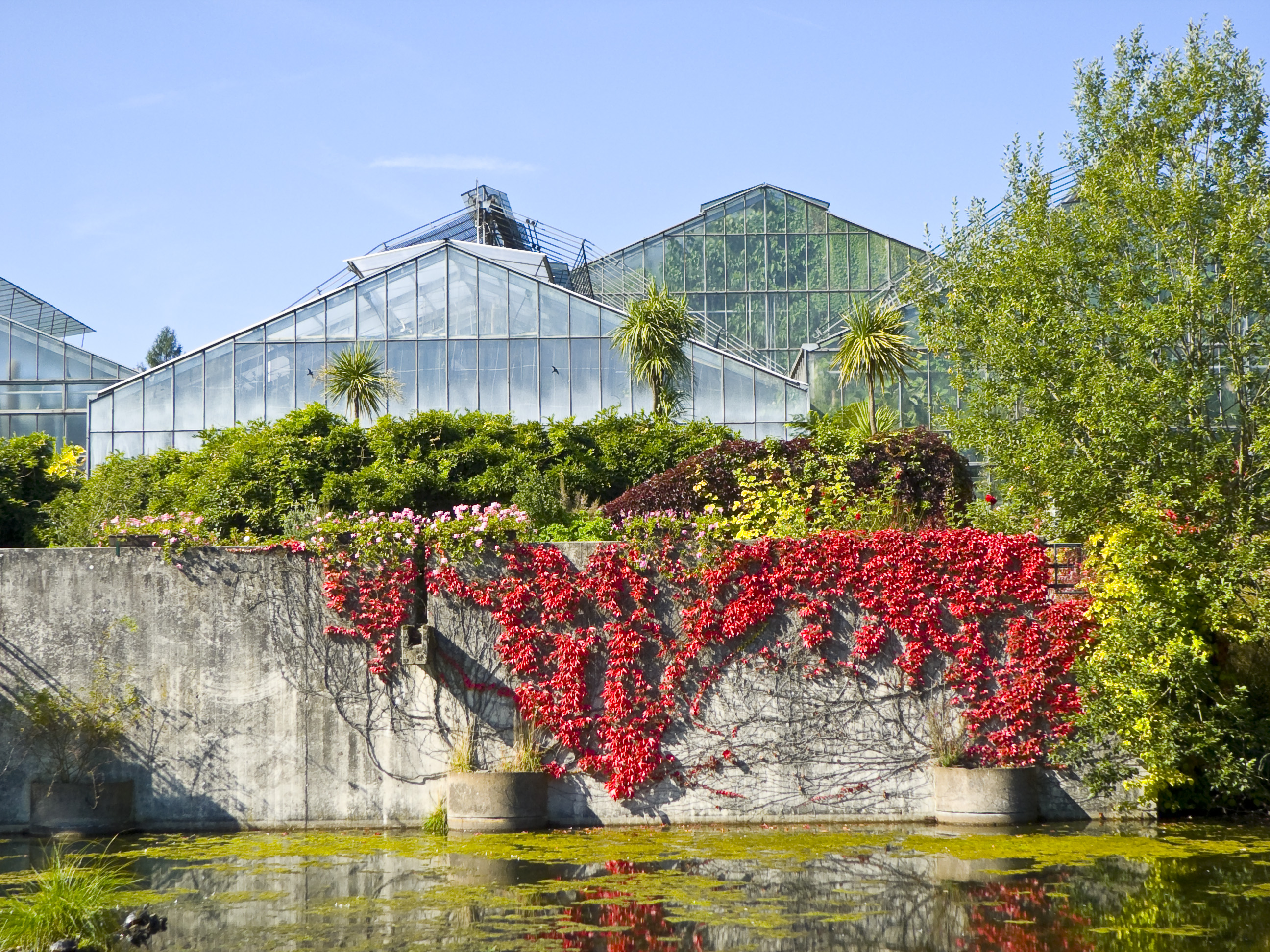
Greenhouses

The Botanischer Garten Marburg (20 hectares), also known as the Neuer Botanischer Garten Marburg, is a botanical garden maintained by the University of Marburg, located on Karl-von-Frisch-Straße, Marburg, Hesse, Germany, and open daily. An admission fee is charged.

The garden was created between 1961-1977 to replace the Alter Botanischer Garten Marburg, dating from 1810. Its construction involved movement of some 80,000 m^{3} of earth, creating a pond and a brook about 1 km long, as well as a major effort to build greenhouses. The garden was inaugurated in June 1977 to celebrate the university's 450th anniversary.

Outdoor areas of the garden are organized as follows:

- Alpinum - rock garden representing plants from the high mountains of Europe, western Asia, the Himalayas, Australia, and New Zealand.
- Arboretum - focusing on conifers, including Sequoiadendron giganteum and Metasequoia glyptostroboides, as well as alders, ash, birches, ginkgos, hazels, maples, oaks, deciduous poplars, sycamores, and willows, representing both native and exotic species.
- Burial mounds - Bronze Age graves.
- Fern collection - 80 fern species.
- Forest - spring-blooming plants including Anemone, Gagea, Iris, Narcissus, Pulsatilla, Scilla, and Tulipa.
- Heather and rhododendron garden - numerous heather and rhododendron species including Calluna vulgaris, Erica carnea, Erica cinerea, and Erica tetralix.
- Medicinal and useful plants - including cereals and other carbohydrates, succulents, vegetables, fiber plants, tobacco plants, rubber plants, and dye plants.
- Systematic garden - representatives of seed plant families organized by biological classification

In addition, the garden's greenhouses cover total area of 1,700 square meters as follows: tropical house (545 m², 12 m height); Canary Islands house (182 m² + 82 m², 7 m); tropical crop house (182 m², 7 m) with plants including Ananas comosus and Coffea arabica; Amazon house (123 m², 6 m) containing aquatic plants of the Amazon region including Bruguiera sexangula and Victoria amazonica; tropical fern house (182 m², 7 m); succulent house (227 m², 7 m); Australian outback house (182 m², 7 m); and carnivorous plant house (not open to the public). During summer time (May to October) one house is dedicated to butterflies and plants from the middle and south american region.

== See also ==
- Alter Botanischer Garten Marburg
- List of botanical gardens in Germany
