= Johann Heinrich Gustav Meyer =

German landscape architect and historian

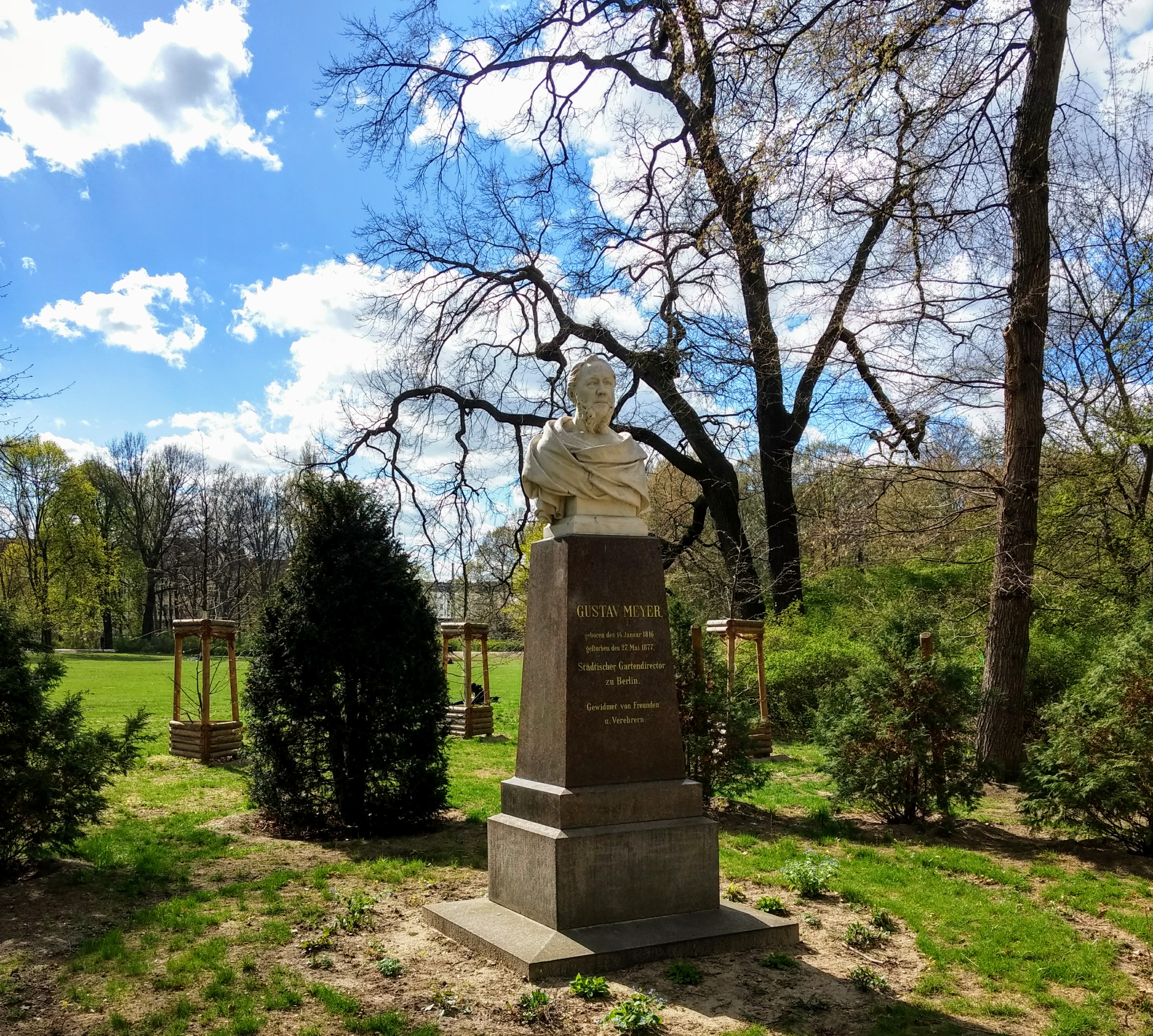
Bust of Gustav Meyer in Treptower Park

Johann Heinrich Gustav Meyer (14 January 1816, Frauendorf - 27 May 1877, Berlin) often just referred to as Gustav Meyer, was a German landscape architect and garden historian. As director of the gardens in the city of Berlin he designed parks and green areas for the city and use by the citizens. He also wrote a gardens manual Lehrbuch der schönen Gartenkunst: mit besonderer Rücksicht auf die praktische Ausführung von Gärten und Parkanlagen (1873) which included a historical view on gardening styles from Arabia, China, England, Italy, France and Holland.

Meyer trained at the Royal Gardening School in Potsdam under Peter Joseph Lenné and others. He worked on the planning of gardens, landscape photography and designed several gardens around Potsdam on orders from Frederick William IV. The style of gardening is called the Lenné Meyer school and used both geometric forms and free-form styles. He was appointed as court gardener in 1859. On July 1, 1870, he was appointed garden director of Berlin. His work included the design of Treptower Park and Humboldthain in which he used Humboldt's idea of using vegetation from different parts of the world.

He died in 1877 and is buried at Saarmunderstraße, now Heinrich-Mann-Allee 25, in Potsdam. He was succeeded by Hermann Mächtig (1837–1909). Gustav-Meyer-Allee and Gustav-Meyer-Straße (Zehlendorf) are named after him.
