= Jella Haase =

German actress (born 1992)

- Haase in 2026
- Born: 26 October 1992 (age 33); Berlin-Kreuzberg, Germany
- Occupation: Actress
- Years active: 2009–present

Jella Haase (born 26 October 1992) is a German actress, known internationally for her leading role in the Netflix action-thriller comedy television series Kleo. Her film credits include Lollipop Monster, Combat Girls (both 2011) and Fack ju Göhte (2013). She has also appeared on the television shows Polizeiruf 110 and Alpha 0.7 – Der Feind in dir. She won the Bavarian Film Award for Best Young Actress in 2012, the Günter Strack Television Award in 2013 and earned a nomination at the German Film Awards in 2014.

== Early life and education ==
Jella Haase was born on 26 October 1992 in Berlin-Kreuzberg. Her mother is a dentist.

== Career ==
Haase began her career as a child actor in drama theatre. In 2009, she made her film debut in the short film Der letzte Rest at age 17.

Her first major role was in the television film Mama kommt! It was followed by other TV productions, including two appearances in Polizeiruf 110. In 2010, she starred in six episodes of Alpha 0.7 – Der Feind in dir.

In 2011, she appeared in the movie Men in the City 2. She also had a leading role in David Wnendt's film about neo-Nazis, Combat Girls, where she appeared with Alina Levshin and Gerdy Zint. For this role, and also for the 2011 Ziska Riemann's directorial debut film Lollipop Monster, she received the Bavarian Film Award for Best Young Actress in 2012.

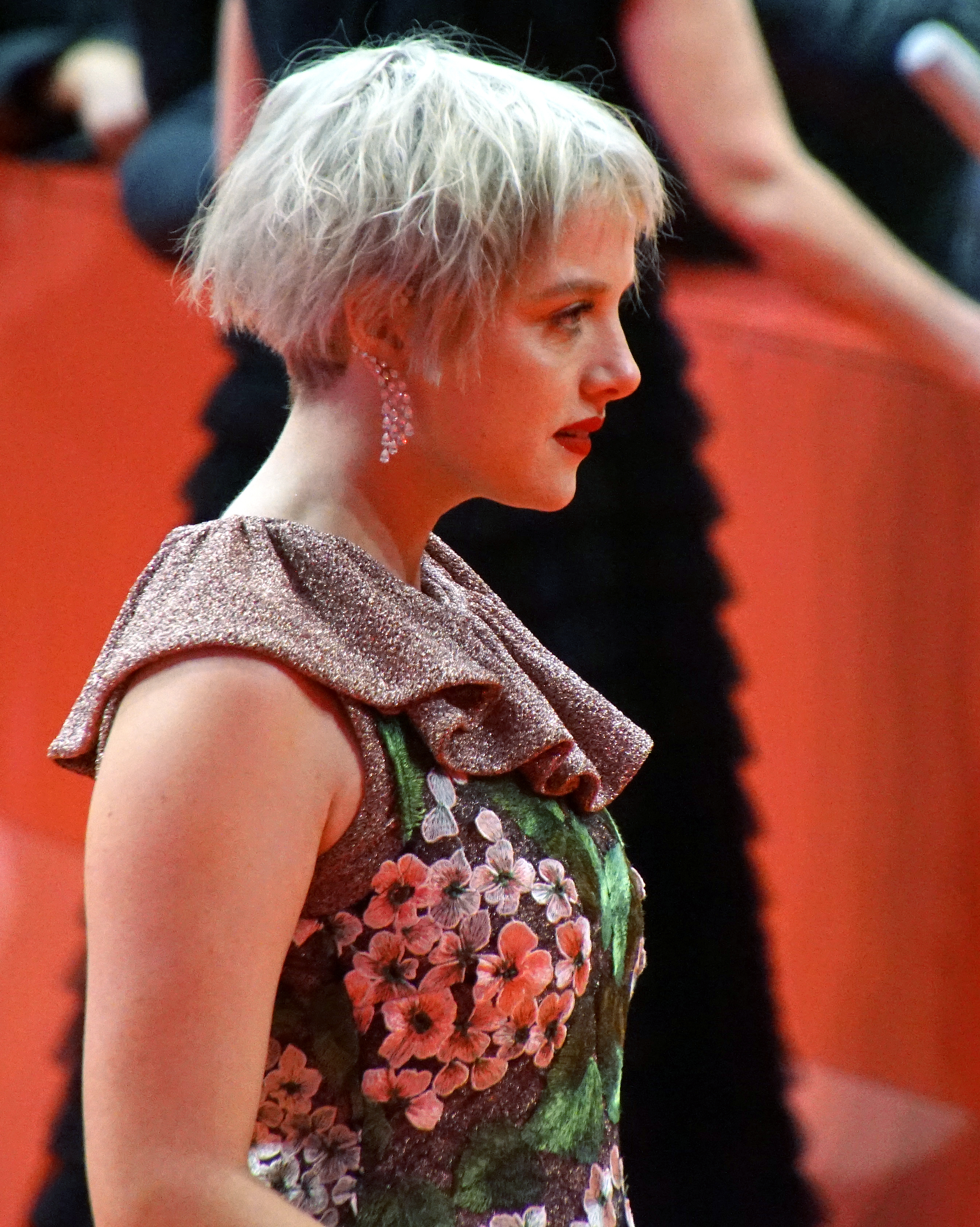
Haase at the Berlinale 2020

In 2013, she played an underage prostitute who films herself having sex with judges to blackmail them, in the film Puppenspieler. She also received the Günter-Strack-Television Award in June 2013 for Best Actress. In the same year, she played teenager Chantal Ackermann in the comedy film Fack ju Göhte directed by Bora Dağtekin. For her role, she was nominated for the German Film Award for Best Actress in a Supporting Role in 2014. In 2015, she starred as Lara in the film 4 Kings.

In 2022, she starred in the Netflix action-thriller comedy television series Kleo, which was renewed for a second season, airing in July 2024. She also voiced Violetta in My Fairy Troublemaker.

== Awards ==
| Year | Award | Category | For | Result |
|---|---|---|---|---|
| 2012 | Bavarian Film Awards | Best Young Actress | Lollipop Monster & Combat Girls | Won |
| 2014 | German Film Award | Best Performance by an Actress in a Supporting Role | Fack ju Göhte | Nominated |
| 2013 | Günter Strack TV Award | Best Young Actress | Polizeiruf 110 | Won |
| 2011 | Günter Strack TV Award | Best Young Actress | Polizeiruf 110 | Nominated |
| 2012 | Jupiter Award | Best German Actress | Lollipop Monster | Nominated |
