= Ruby Red (film) =

- Film poster
- German: Rubinrot
- Directed by: Felix Fuchssteiner
- Produced by: Philipp Budweg, Tom Blieninger, Hans W. Geißendörfer, Markus Zimmer
- Starring: Maria Ehrich; Jannis Niewöhner; Laura Berlin
- Cinematography: Sonja Rom
- Edited by: Wolfgang Weigl
- Music by: Philipp F. Kölmel
- Release date: 5 March 2013
- Running time: 122 minutes
- Country: Germany
- Language: German

Ruby Red (German: Rubinrot) is a 2013 German fantasy film based on the book with the same name by Kerstin Gier and is the first part in the Ruby Red Trilogy. A sequel was produced in 2014 under the title Sapphire Blue (German: Saphirblau), followed in 2016 by Emerald Green (German: Smaragdgrün).

== Plot ==
A young couple, Paul and Lucy, are chased by a group of men intent on killing them and taking their chronograph, a time travel machine, which they use to escape.

The day before Gwendolyn "Gwen" Shepherd's sixteenth birthday, she attends the birthday party of her cousin Charlotte, who is a day older than her. Charlotte plays an important role in the Order of Count Saint Germain and her party guests include several members of London's high society. When Charlotte seemingly almost faints she is brought to the Order, accompanied by the young and attractive Gideon de Villiers. As a member of the Order who has inherited the time travel gene, Charlotte is expected to complete the Order's mission.

In the following days, Gwen begins to see ghosts and feel dizzy before making several uncontrolled jumps into the past, and her friend Leslie deduces that she must be carrying the gene instead of Charlotte. Grace, Gwen's mother, brings her to the Order, which is in possession of a chronograph, a time travel machine for controlled jumps that she will do with Gideon de Villiers, a time traveller himself. Gideon is reluctant to work with Gwen due to her not receiving the same preparation for her role as Charlotte.

The Order's chronograph is hidden away due to a different one being stolen by Paul and Lucy with Grace's help. Gwen is eventually inducted as the last of twelve time travellers and learns about the mission: due to the theft of the previous chronograph by Gwen's cousin Lucy, blood samples have to be collected from all twelve time travellers to complete the samples of this chronograph. Gideon has been unable to collect blood from Lady Tilney, Gwen's great-great-grandmother, as she will only cooperate with Gwen. When they visit Lady Tilney in 1912, Lucy and Paul appear, warning Gwendolyn of the dangers of completing the blood samples and of the Count of Saint Germain's plans to sacrifice her life to achieve his goals.

Already sceptical of the Order's secrecy, Gwen sympathises with Lucy and Paul, while Gideon's loyalty to the Order begins to crack after the encounter. Back in the present, Charlotte recruits a teacher, Mr. Whitman, at their school to stop Gwen and her best friend Leslie from finding out more. Gwen and Gideon go to meet with the Count of Saint Germain in 1782, and he uses his magic, mind-reading and telekinesis, to threaten and strangle Gwen, while inquiring about her magic. Gwen and Gideon leave and are attacked before jumping to the present. During the fight, Gwen saves Gideon's life. Gwen wants to escape the Order, but Gideon says they can't because the Order "owns" them. Ultimately he decides to help her search for answers.

At night, they sneak into the Order's archives to find an ancient prophecy about themselves, but the documents are locked away in the present. Using a note from Gwen's grandfather, they convince Mr. George, a member of the Order, to let them find the documents in the past. Travelling to 1942, they find and read an incomplete version of the prophecy about how Gwen's death as the Ruby, bleeding out in the snow, will bring the circle of the twelve to completion. While trying to escape the security guards, Gwen falls from the top of a tower. She wakes up in a pool of her own blood in the snow-covered courtyard and makes it inside the building before fainting. Back in the present, Gwen is found unconscious from hypothermia but otherwise uninjured. Against the will of the Grand Master of the Order, Gideon carries her to the doctor to keep her alive and promises to keep her safe.

After she has recovered, Gwendolyn goes to her school's ball together with Gideon wearing Lucy's dress. She discovers from a family photo that the ghost boy she has been seeing was her grandfather's younger brother, and she concludes that seeing ghosts could be her magic. Still not knowing what will happen once the blood samples are complete, Gideon and Gwen share a kiss at the ball. The film concludes with Paul and Lucy escaping yet again from a group of men who are chasing them.

== Production Background ==
=== Origin ===
The film's rights were acquired by the production companies "schlicht und ergreifend GmbH" and "mem-Film" (mind's eye media GmbH). Katharina Schöde wrote the script and Felix Fuchssteiner directed. The film was created in collaboration with Concorde Filmverleih GmbH (a film distribution company) and Tele München Fernseh Produktionsgesellschaft (a manufacturing company).

=== Cast ===
After auditions, the main roles were given to the young actors Maria Ehrich, Jannis Niewöhner, and Laura Berlin. Some other well-known actors like Veronica Ferres, Axel Milberg, Katharina Thalbach, Kostja Ullmann and Josefine Preuß are in the movie too.

- Maria Ehrich as Gwendolyn "Gwen" Shepherd
- Jannis Niewöhner as Gideon de Villiers
- Laura Berlin as Charlotte Montrose
- Veronica Ferres as Grace Shepherd
- Uwe Kockisch as Falk de Villiers
- Katharina Thalbach as Tante Maddy
- Gottfried John as Dr. White
- Josefine Preuß as Lucy Montrose
- Florian Bartholomäi as Paul de Villiers
- Johannes Silberschneider as Mr. Bernhard
- Gerlinde Locker as Lady Arista
- Axel Milberg as Lucas Montrose
- Jennifer Lotsi as Leslie Hay
- Philip Wiegratz as Gordon Gelderman

=== Filming ===
The movie was filmed over 42 days, from February 21, 2012 to April 26, 2012 in Mulhouse/Thuringia, Eisenach, Weimar, Cologne, Aachen, Juelich, Coburg, Bayreuth, and London. All scenes were filmed at real locations and no backdrop was used. The filming locations must look like London architecture, but also look like their respective time periods.

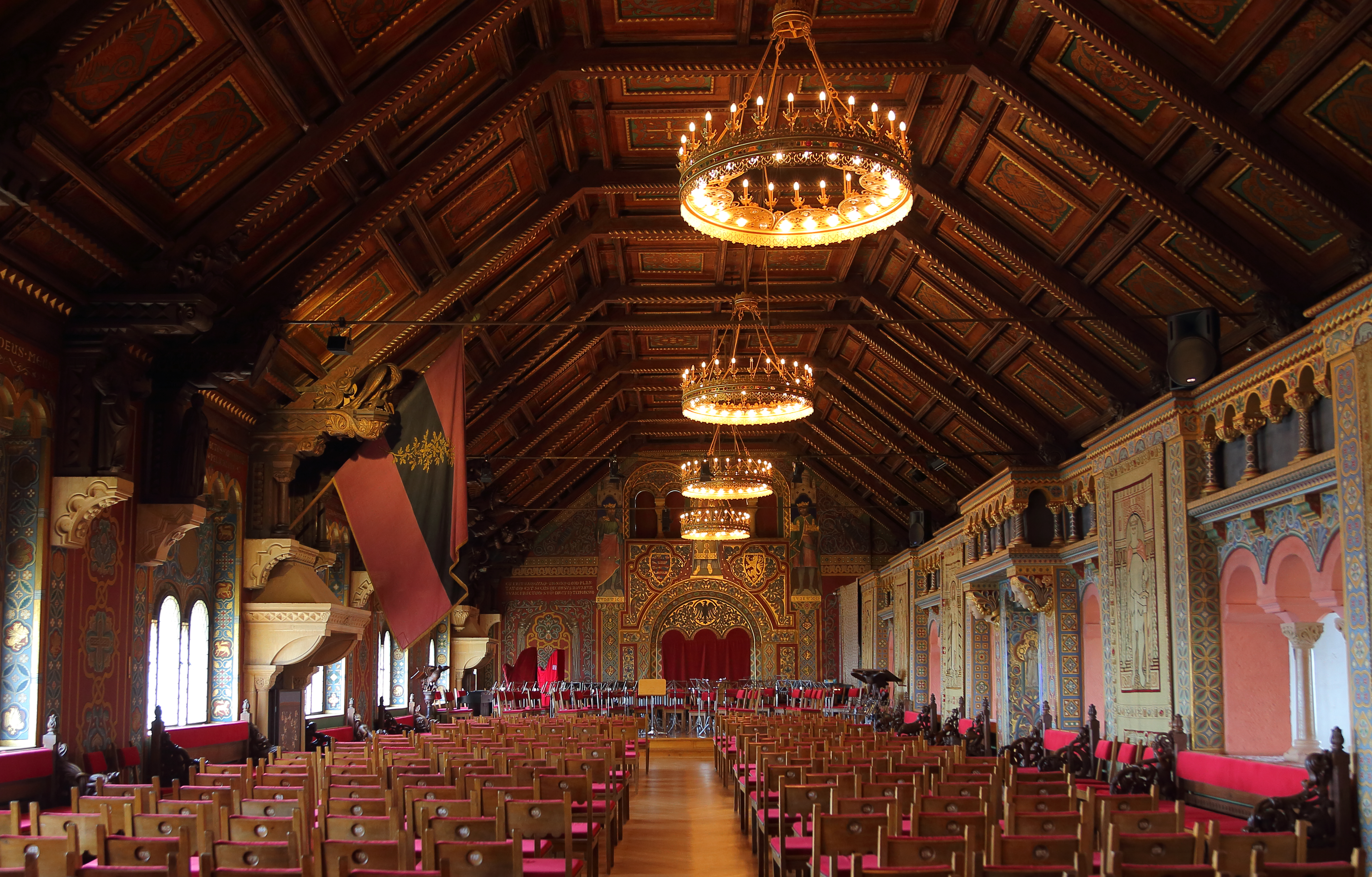
Ballroom in Wartburg Castle

The headquarters of the guards should resemble a middle age fortress. The filming for the scenes in the "Dragon Hall" is in a ballroom at Wartburg Castle near Eisenach. A few staircases and arcades (usually an arch covered walkways) were used as backdrops, but most scenes in the "underground secret passage of the Order" were filmed in the casemates of the Juelich Citadel. The historic walls of the Mulhouse Town Hall, including the large council hall, the City Council Archives, and the gatehouse were used to make up the Order's property. The filming of "Madame Rossini's Tailor Workshop" was at Callenberg Castle in Coburg, specifically in the castle chapel. The background for the "Observatory of the Secret Order" was at Aachen Observatory, with its historic telescope, and the theft of the Chronograph was filmed at the Paradise Fountain in the square of Aachen Cathedral. The cathedral courtyard was transformed into the "outdoor area of the headquarters" by using different historical streetlamps, cars with British license plates, and antique horse-drawn carriages for the three different time periods.

The film sequence of Christmas 1942, where Gwendolyn and Gideon sneak into the Observatory of the secret Order, was described by producer Felix Fuchssteiner as: "Ultimately Gwen and Gideon climb up the stairs at Wartburg Castle, then are in the Observatory in Aachen, Gwen falls out the Observatory into the courtyard in Coburg and goes through the door and arrives in Juelich."

The Ketschendorf Castle in Corburg, which has a Neo-Gothic style, is the main inspiration for the "Montrose House", Gwendolyn's family home. The now youth hostel was vacant, so the set designers had free rein to decorate the room for the years 1994 and 2010.

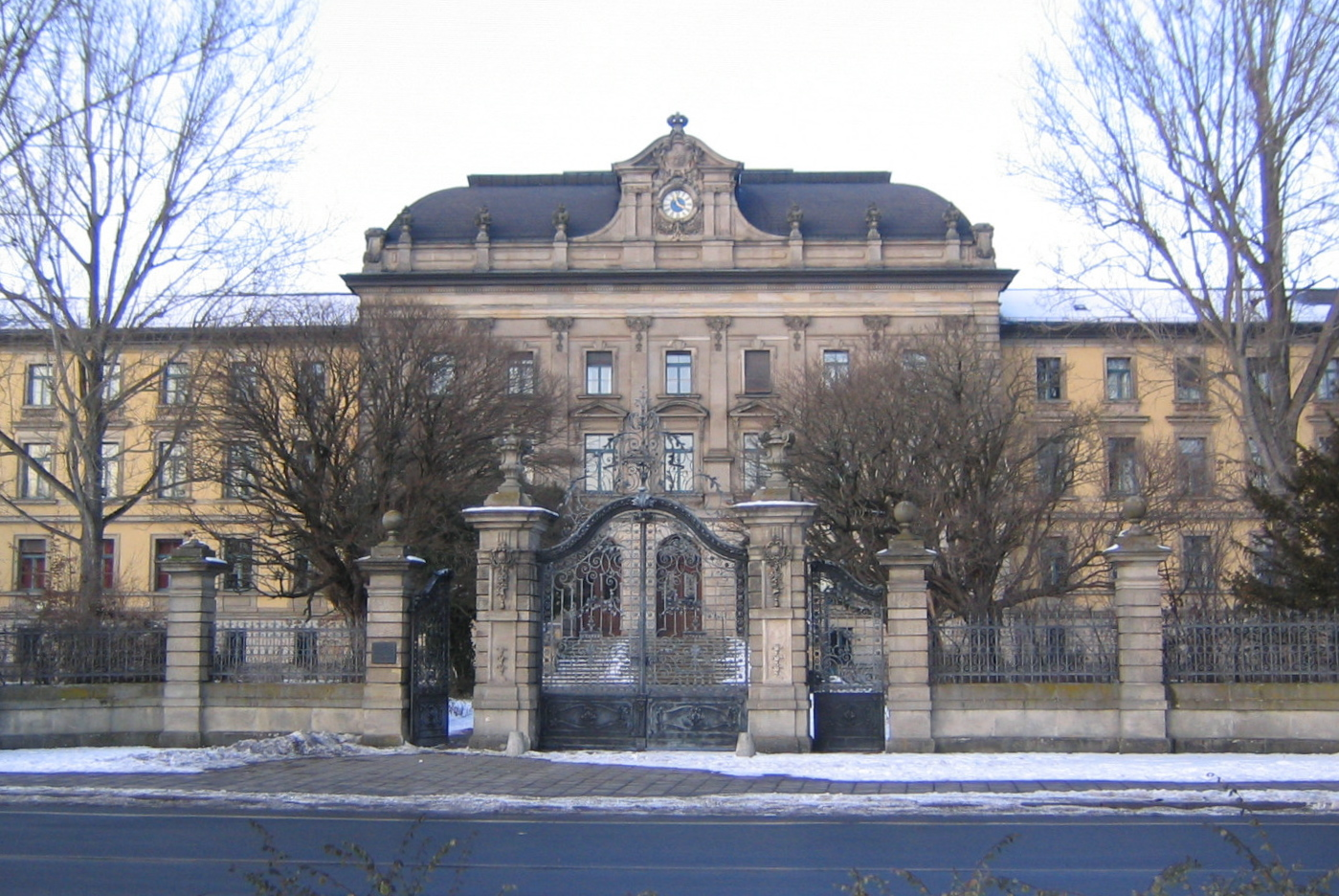
Markgräfin-Wilhelmine-Gymnasium in Bayreuth

Most of the interior shots for the school scenes at "St. Lennox High" are at the Markgräfin-Wilhelmine Gymnasium in Bayreuth during their 2012 spring break. Only the "Cherry Blossom Ball" was filmed in the Marble Hall of the Rosenau Castle in Coburg. For the outside of the college, Ehrenburg Castle was chosen for its Neo-Gothic facade and their spacious castle square became a "school parking lot" by adding British red telephone boxes and mailboxes.

For Gwendolyn's first time jump, Ludwigsstraße in Bayreuth was transformed into Victorian-era London in the middle of April in 2012. To achieve this, traffic signs were removed, additional window bars were put on windows facing the street, historical lanterns and lamps were put up, period accurate English street signs and ads were added, and the street had costumed extras, horse-drawn carriages, and vintage cars.

The setting for the visit to Lady Tilney in 1912 was in a luxurious mansion on Reuterweg in Eisenach. The attack on the carriage in 1787 was filmed at the Decksteiner Wieher (also known as "Hyde Park") in Cologne. Kerstin Gier got a cameo as a bypasser, who is frightened by the time traveler's sudden appearance. In action scenes, Jannis Niewoehner did most of his stunts himself. To prepare, he did intensive fencing and close combat training in Hungary beforehand.

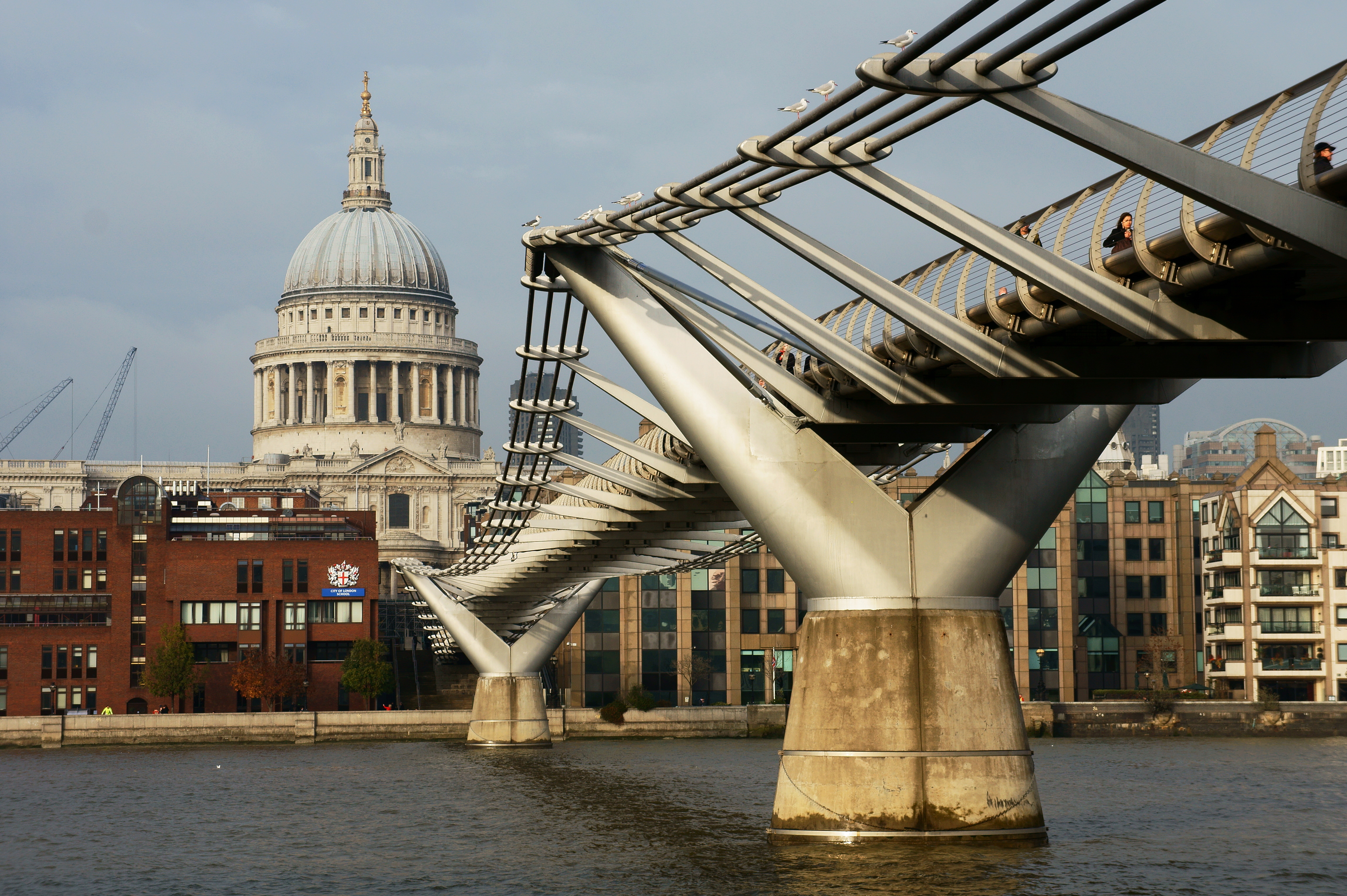
Millennium Bridge, London

During the four-day shoot near the end of April 2012 in London, only Maria Ehrich, Jannis Niewoehner, and Laura Berlin were there. They shot scenes from the book at the actual locations, for example scenes like Gwendolyn's telephone call on the Millennium Bridge, Gwen walking home from school along Camden High Street, Gwen's night-time bike trip, and the meeting between Gwen and Gideon at the Tower Bridge was filmed without barriers and during normal business hours. The aerial shots were taken on location out of a helicopter.

=== Music ===
On March 8th, 2013, Sony Classical released the soundtrack for the film. It had the title track Faster by Sofi de la Torre, as well as the songs The Perfect Fall, Recognize Me, and Wings by the same artist.

The classical score was rehearsed at Staatskapelle Weimar, was recorded at Volkshaus Jena, and was created by the film composer Philipp F. Kölmel.

=== Release ===
The film had its world premiere on March 5th, 2013 in Munich. The regular theater release in Germany was on March 14th, 2013. The DVD and Blu-ray released on September 30th, 2013.

== Differences between Book and Movie ==
Book	Movie
In the opening scene, Paul and Lucy land in Hyde Park in 1912. They just traveled to the past using the Chronograph. The guards of the Lodge don't know exactly where Paul and Lucy fled to, but they assume it's a few weeks before Gwendolyn's birth.	In the opening scene, Paul and Lucy are being chased by the members of the Lodge and are cornered in a courtyard. Falk de Villiers shoots at them as they escape to the past using the Chronograph. The guards know the exact time that Paul and Lucy fled to.
Gwen knows about the time travel gene in her family and assumes along with her family that her cousin, Charlotte, has it. As Gwen gets dizzy more often, she thinks that she could have the gene. (The initial jump for time travelers happens around their 16th birthday.)	Gwen doesn't know about the time travel gene in her family until she first experiences it.
Gwen's first uncontrolled jump takes her to around 1906 and passersbys are simply confused when she asks about the year and ignore her.	When Gwen first jumps to the past uncontrolled, she causes a commotion and is mistaken as a thief in front of her house and someone tries to arrest her. The movie mixes elements of the first and second time jump from the book.
Gwen's second uncontrolled jump takes her to the following night of the first jump and Gwen hides in her house on the 3rd floor. A servant thinks she is a thief and tries to catch her. Eventually all the servants are looking for her. Gwen makes friends with a stuffed crocodile as she hides in a storage room.	Gwen has another uncontrolled time jump to the following night of her first jump. There, Gwen meets her grandfather, Lucas Montrose, in the house. He was already mentioned in the book but wouldn't make an appearance until the 2nd volume in the Ruby Red Trilogy, Saphire Blue.
Charlotte and Gwen's birthday parties are not mentioned.	Gwen's cousin, Charlotte, has a big 16th birthday party with lots of guests.
Gwen sees Gideon for the first time when she does her third uncontrolled time jump at her school. She jumps to the 1700s and her school in this time is the Palace of the Pimplebottoms, who are the parents of the school ghost, James. Gideon doesn't see her and they both meet each other for the first time in Temple.	Gwen sees Gideon for the first time at Charlotte's big birthday party.
Falk de Villiers has gray, shoulder length hair and amber eyes.	Falk de Villiers has dark hair and eyes.
The members of the Order are confident in their mission that shutting the circle of blood in the Chronograph will help the welfare of humanity. Who it actually serves is left unanswered in the book and would be answered in the 3rd volume, Emerald Green.	Leslie suspects that the members of the Order want world domination, after Gwen's first contact with them.
Every member in the inner circle owns a ring of the 12 stars (on the ring is a 12-pointed star). Gideon also owns one. Gwen doesn't have a ring, but she is lent one by Thomas George after her 4th uncontrolled, but monitored time jump.	Gwen receives a unique ring from Falk de Villiers in Temple. It has an inserted red stone that looks like a ruby. All time travel gene carriers own a ring with a stone in the color of a gemstone that represents them.
Before her 4th time jump, Gwendolyn takes a key from the "Document Room" at the Order so she can give her friend Leslie a souvenir from the past.	Gwendolyn gets a necklace with a key from her "mom", Grace, on her birthday. The necklace was given to Lucy for safekeeping until Gwendolyn's 16th birthday.
Gwen's nine-year old sister, Caroline, plays an important role in the family.	Gwen's nine-year old sister, Caroline, is not in the movie. She is briefly mentioned in the second movie (Saphire Blue), when Great-Aunt Maddy said Caroline is at boarding school.
Thomas George explains to Gwendolyn that traveling to one's own lifetime with the Chronograph is not possible. A quote from Annals of the Guards confirms that and attributes it to the Continuum. Uncontrolled jumps to one's lifetime are not known to happen, but are highly unlikely, according to the Continuum.	During Gwendolyn's second jump (where she met her grandfather, Lucas Montrose) it's mentioned that Lucy and Paul just now came to the past with the Chronograph, which must be after Gwen's birth. Therefore, Gwen is traveling to her current time.
Gwen has seen ghosts since her childhood. For example, a ghost of a gargoyle in Durham and the ghost of James A.P Pimpblebottom in school.	Gwen first sees ghosts on her 16th birthday.
The small young boy Robert, that Gwen sees as a ghost, is the drowned son of Dr. White.	The small young boy is the dead brother of Lucas Montrose.
Lady Arista and Dr. White argues about whether Paul or Lucy convinced the other to steal the chronograph.	Gwen and Gideon argue about whether Paul or Lucy convinced the other to steal the chronograph.
Madame Rossini is described as short, chubby and strawberry blonde.	Madame Rossini is tall, slim and has dark hair.
The first time jump Gwen and Gideon make together is to visit the Count in 1782.	The order of Gwen and Gideon's time jump is reversed. The first time they jump together, they go to Lady Tilney in 1912.
After the time jump to 1782, Gideon explains to Gwen that the timeline is not allowed to be broken, otherwise she might not be born.	Before jumping to 1912, Gideon explains to Gwen that the timeline is not allowed to be broken, otherwise she might not be born.
No equivalent book scene.	The scenes with Gideon and Falk de Villiers practicing fencing, the Indian restaurant, Gwen's credit card, the Cherry Blossom Ball, the ceremonial initiation into the Lodge, the "rummaging" and spending a night in the Archive, and Gwen falling from the roof is not in the book. Also, Gwen narrates about Mr. George and Gideon at the Ball in the movie.
The Count suffocates Gwendolyn with telekinesis. She doesn't tell anyone.	When the Count suffocates Gwendolyn with telekinesis, Gideon senses danger and later sees the strangulation marks on her neck.
Gwendolyn and Gideon's relationship changes in the end. They realize how attracted they are to each other.	Gwen and Gideon decide at the end to explore the mysteries of the Order together, but this doesn't happen until the last part of the trilogy, Emerald Green.
The prophecy is something the protagonists know.	Only the Grandmaster (and the Count) know about the prophecy.
There's a rule that all time travelers must visit the Count after their initiation jump.	In the movie, Gwendolyn wants to visit the Count.
Leslie is blond and has freckles. The school ghost, James, doesn’t like these traits.	Leslie has black hair and is dark-skinned. James is bothered by her braces.
Before the jump to 1912, Falk de Villiers says that Gideon looks like a ringmaster with his mustache.	Before the jump to 1912, Gwen says that Gideon looks like a ringmaster with his mustache.
Gwen and Gideon kiss for the first time in a confessional box at a church after coming back from their time jump to Lady Tilney in 1912. The kiss distracts Gwen so much that she didn't notice that she and Gideon jumped back to the present.	Gwen and Gideon almost kiss in the confessional box, but are interrupted by the time jump and get thrown out of the box. The first kiss happens at a school ball (at the end of the film).

== Reception ==
"The time travel scenes leave you wanting more, but the romance hasn't sparked (yet): Felix Fuchssteiner's adaptation of the Young Adult best seller is a decent film, but above all, it holds the promise of an even better sequel."

– filmstart.de

"'Ruby Red' is best for female readers or fans of the book series. However, adults and those unfamiliar with the series can still be entertained by the intriguing story and detailed descriptions brought to life through beautiful illustrations."

– Movie Worlds

"Wherever special effects are used in 'Ruby Red', it works very well. Nevertheless, the film appears a bit too "international". When German actors say "Mom" and "Dad", it doesn't sound quite right. The characters browsing English websites and writing English text messages should cover that up, but it only causes confusion. The film doesn't really need it."

– www.freistunde-magazin.de

"Some narrative stumbles are covered up by the lead actress in particular."

– Lexikon des Internationalen Films

== Audience Attendance and Box Office Success ==
The film was seen by 480,000 viewers in theaters and earned 3.4 million Euros (~3.95 million USD) in the box office. The worldwide box office reported 5.5 million USD.

== Awards ==
In 2013, the score by Phillip F. Kömel was nominated for the International Film Music Critics Award (IFMCA) in the category "Best Score for Action/Adventure/Thrillers". Lead actor, Jannis Niewöhner, was nominated a year later for the New Faces Award as "Best Talented Young Actor".

== Sequel ==
In September 2013, the production of the second movie "Saphire Blue" was announced. It released on August 14th, 2014 in theaters.
