= Haasse =

Haasse is a surname. Notable people with the surname include:

- Hella Haasse (1918–2011), Dutch writer
- Jella Haase (born 1992), German actress
