= Nix Festes =

- Written by: Markus Barth
- Starring: Josefine Preuß; Sebastian Fräsdorf; Marie Rathscheck; Tim Kalkhof; Dirk Martens
- Country of origin: Germany
- Original language: German
- No. of seasons: 2
- No. of episodes: 12

Production
- Producer: ITV Studios Germany
- Production locations: Berlin, Germany
- Running time: 28 minutes

Original release
- Network: ZDFneo
- Release: 27 February 2018 – 26 October 2021

Nix Festes is a German television series that premieres on 27 February 2018 on ZDFneo.

== Plot ==
A flat share in one of the last not yet gentrified old buildings in Berlin-Kreuzberg has to deal with the ups and downs of life. All are in a kind of limbo of life, in which it does not want to work in a bourgeois way neither with the love nor the profession. But neither the authors' colleagues and ex-lovers Wiebke (Josefine Preuss) and Jonas (Sebastian Fräsdorf) nor their friends, student Jenny (Marie Rathscheck) and cook Basti (Tim Kalkhof), can be so easily diverted from their personal life. And if all else fails, Lennart (Dirk Martens), the owner of her favorite café, will surely be in the know.

== Episodes ==
The first season in 2018 had four episodes, followed by eight in 2021.

== Background ==
Originally, the series should start on 20 February 2018 on ZDFneo, but it was decided to postpone it to 27 February. Since on 20 February the Champions League match between Bayern Munich and Beşiktaş is running on ZDF, the new series will probably be taken out of the line of fire.

== See also ==
- List of German television series
