= Laura Berlin =

German actress and model

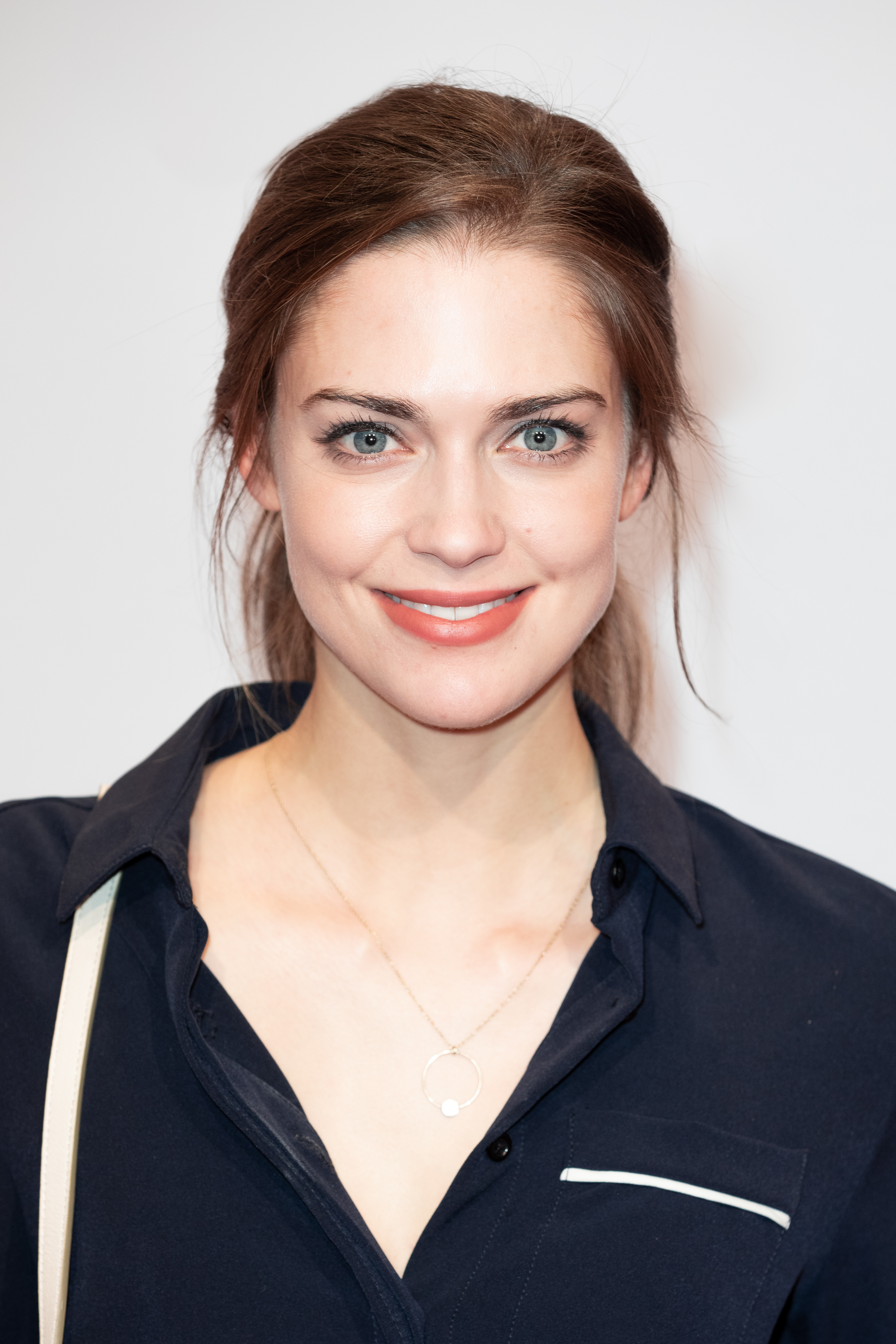
- Laura Berlin at the 2019 Berlinale Medienboard Party
- Born: 13 March 1990 (age 36); East Berlin, East Germany
- Occupation: Actress
- Years active: 2006–present

Laura Berlin (born 13 March 1990) is a German actress and model. She is known for her role as Emma of Normandy in the Netflix original series Vikings: Valhalla, which premiered in 2022.

== Modelling and early career ==
Laura Berlin was discovered by a model agency as a teenager, by the age of 17, she was featured on the front page of the Italian edition of Elle. She studied acting at Anja Joos Management school, where she participated in many school theatre productions such as "Der Streit" and "Frühlingserwachen". She also took 2009 Workshop "Directing and Acting" with Petra Zieser (dffb), and 2010 "Acting for young talents" with Teresa Harder (Frank Betzelt Coaching).

== Acting ==
In 2009, she played the main character in the Thomas Freundner film Schneewittchen ("Snow White") [2009], alongside: Sonja Kirchberger, Jaecki Schwarz, Martin Brambach and Jörg Schüttauf. She took the role of Charlotte Montrose in the films Ruby Red (2013), Sapphire Blue (2014) and Emerald Green (2016), inspired by Kerstin Gier's book series Ruby Red Trilogy. In 2016, she played the main role in the music video of Prinz Pi's song 1,40m. Moreover, she played the role of a bewildered ghost girl as a guest star in the series Binny and the Ghost (2016).

In 2016, she has appeared as Jenny Hülshoff in the YouTube series Alles Liebe, Annette.

Most recently, she stars as Queen Emma in the Netflix series Vikings: Valhalla directed by Jeb Stuart.

== Filmography ==
=== Film ===
Year	Title	Role	Notes
2010	Eternalsoul.org	Jessy	Short film
2011	Men in the City 2	Hippie	
2013	Ruby Red	Charlotte Montrose	
2014	Sapore di te	Ingrid	
2014	Sapphire Blue	Charlotte Montrose	
2015	Punk Berlin 1982	Hanna	
2015	Meine Bäckerblume	Bäckerin	Short film
2016	Emerald Green	Charlotte Montrose	
2016	UFO: It Is Here	Melissa Stein	
2017	Bullyparade – Der Film	Monirella	
2018	Ronny & Klaid	Angela	
2019	Immenhof – Das Abenteuer eines Sommers	Charly	
2021	The Witch and the Ottoman	Anne	

=== Television ===
Year	Title	Role	Notes
2009	Schneewittchen ("Snow White")	Snow White	Television film
2010	Tod einer Schülerin	Katja Weiss	Television film
2010	Vater aus heiterem Himmel	Bettina	Television film
2010	Notruf Hafenkante	Melissa Wiesenrath	Episode "Risiken und Nebenwirkungen"
2011–2012	SOKO Wismar	Jennifer Karlsen / Anna Blume	2 episodes
2011	SOKO Stuttgart	Denise May	Episode: "Auf die Plätze, fertig, tot"
2013, 2015	SOKO Leipzig	Lisa Braisch / Sarah Fischer	2 episodes
2014	Verbotene Liebe	Janine	4 episodes
2014	Polizeiruf 110	Vanessa	Episode: "Eine mörderische Idee"
2015	My Worst Best Friend	Jana	Television film
2015	Einstein	Julia Weigert	Television film
2015	In aller Freundschaft – Die jungen Ärzte	Smilla Eriksson	Episode: "Starke Mädchen"
2015	Alarm für Cobra 11 – Die Autobahnpolizei	Nadja	Episode: "Lockdown"
2016	Binny and the Ghost	Leonina	Episode: "Leona"
2017–2019	Einstein	Julia Weigert	9 episodes
2017	Blaumacher	Sascha Decker	6 episodes
2017	Bad Cop - kriminell gut	Svenja Althaus	Episode: "Feuer und Flamme"
2018	Der Staatsanwalt	Nina	Episode: "Die Enkelin"
2018	Split Homicide	Ivana Pokovic	Episode: "Mord auf Vis"
2018	Cologne P.D.	Yvonne Becker	Episode: "Monster"
2018	Professor T.	Maren	Episode: "Das verlorene Kind"
2018–2021	Notruf Hafenkante	Dr Eva Grünberg	37 episodes
2019	Inga Lindström	Astrid	Episode: "Auf der Suche nach Dir"
2020	Breaking Even	Charlotte Lindemann	Main role
2022–2024	Vikings: Valhalla	Emma of Normandy	Main role
2025	Foundation	Oceanglass-49	

=== Web ===
Year	Title	Role	Notes
2016–2017	Alles Liebe, Annette	Jenny	4 episodes

=== Music videos ===
Song	Year	Artist	Notes
"The Power of Love"	2006	Oomph!	
"1,40"	2016	Prinz Pi feat. Philipp Dittberner	
"Roundabouts"	2018	Michael Patrick Kelly	
