= Jannis Niewöhner =

German actor

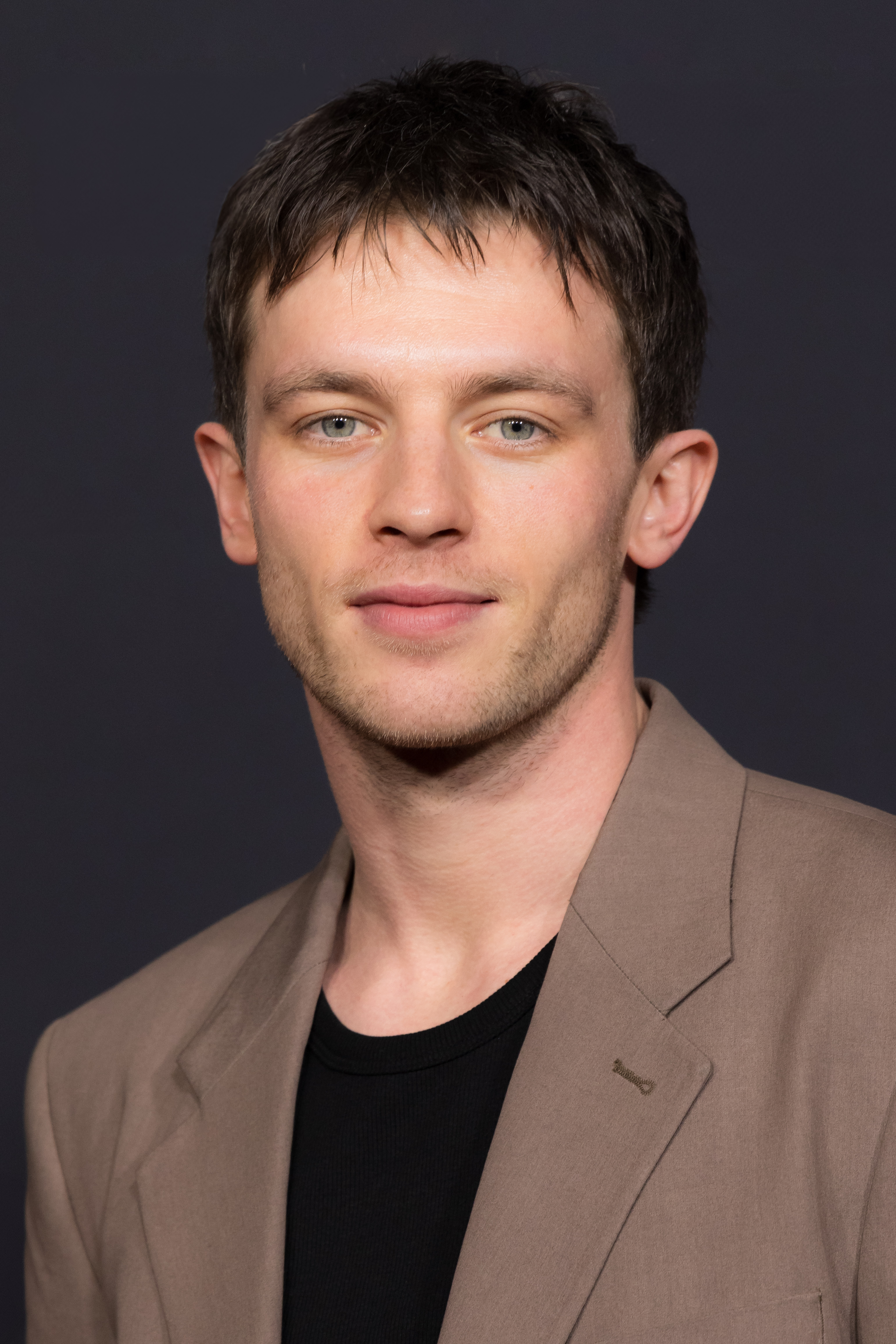
- Niewöhner in 2024
- Born: 30 March 1992 (age 34); Krefeld, North Rhine-Westphalia, Germany
- Occupation: Actor
- Years active: 2002–present

Jannis Niewöhner (German: [ˈjanɪs ˈniːvøːnɐ]) (born 30 March 1992) is a German actor known for his role in the Timeless trilogy of films: Ruby Red, Sapphire Blue, and Emerald Green, based on a book series written by Kerstin Gier. He has appeared in more than twenty films since 2002.

== Selected filmography ==
Film
| Year | Title | Role | Notes |
|---|---|---|---|
| 2006 | TKKG: The Secret of the Mysterious Mind Machine | Peter 'Tim' Carsten | |
| 2007 | Wild Chicks in Love | Maik | |
| 2008 | Summer | Lars | |
| 2009 | Gangs | Jan | |
| 2011 | Alive and Ticking | Young man in pet shop | |
| 2012 | A Year After Tomorrow | Julius Hofer | TV film |
| 2013 | Ruby Red | Gideon de Villiers | |
| 2013 | Heroes | Tobias Hölder | TV film |
| 2013 | Striving for Freedom | Mats | TV film |
| 2014 | Sapphire Blue | Gideon de Villiers | |
| 2015 | 4 Kings | Timo | |
| 2015 | Windstorm 2 | Milan | |
| 2016 | Jonathan | Jonathan | |
| 2016 | Emerald Green | Gideon de Villiers | |
| 2017 | Godless Youth | Zach | |
| 2017 | Windstorm 3: Windstorm and the Wild Horses | Milan | |
| 2017 | High Society | Yann | |
| 2017 | Berlin Station | Armando | |
| 2017 | Maximilian | Archduke Maximilian of Austria | |
| 2018 | Mute | Nicky | |
| 2018 | Asphaltgorillas | Frank | |
| 2018 | Beat (TV series) | Robert "Beat" Schlag | |
| 2019 | The Collini Case | Hans Meyer (young) | |
| 2020 | Narcissus and Goldmund | Goldmund | |
| 2020 | The Turncoat | Walter Proska | |
| 2020 | Cortex | Niko | |
| 2021 | Je suis Karl | Karl | |
| 2021 | Confessions of Felix Krull | Felix Krull | |
| 2021 | Munich - The Edge of War | Paul von Hartmann | |
| 2023 | Stella. A Life. | Rolf Isaakson | |
| 2023 | Napoleon | Hippolyte Charles | |
| 2024 | The New Look | Walter Schellenberg | |
| 2026 | Allegro Pastell | Jerome Daimler | |
| 2026 | Honey | Friedrich Bauman | |

== Awards ==
| Year | Award | Category | Work | Result | Ref. |
|---|---|---|---|---|---|
| 2017 | Jupiter Award | Best German Actor | Smaragdgrün (Emerald Green) | Won | |
| 2019 | International Emmy Awards | Best Actor | Beat | Nominated | |
