= Sapphire Blue (2014 film) =

- German: Saphirblau
- Directed by: Felix Fuchssteiner, Katharina Schöde
- Starring: Maria Ehrich; Jannis Niewöhner
- Release date: 14 August 2014

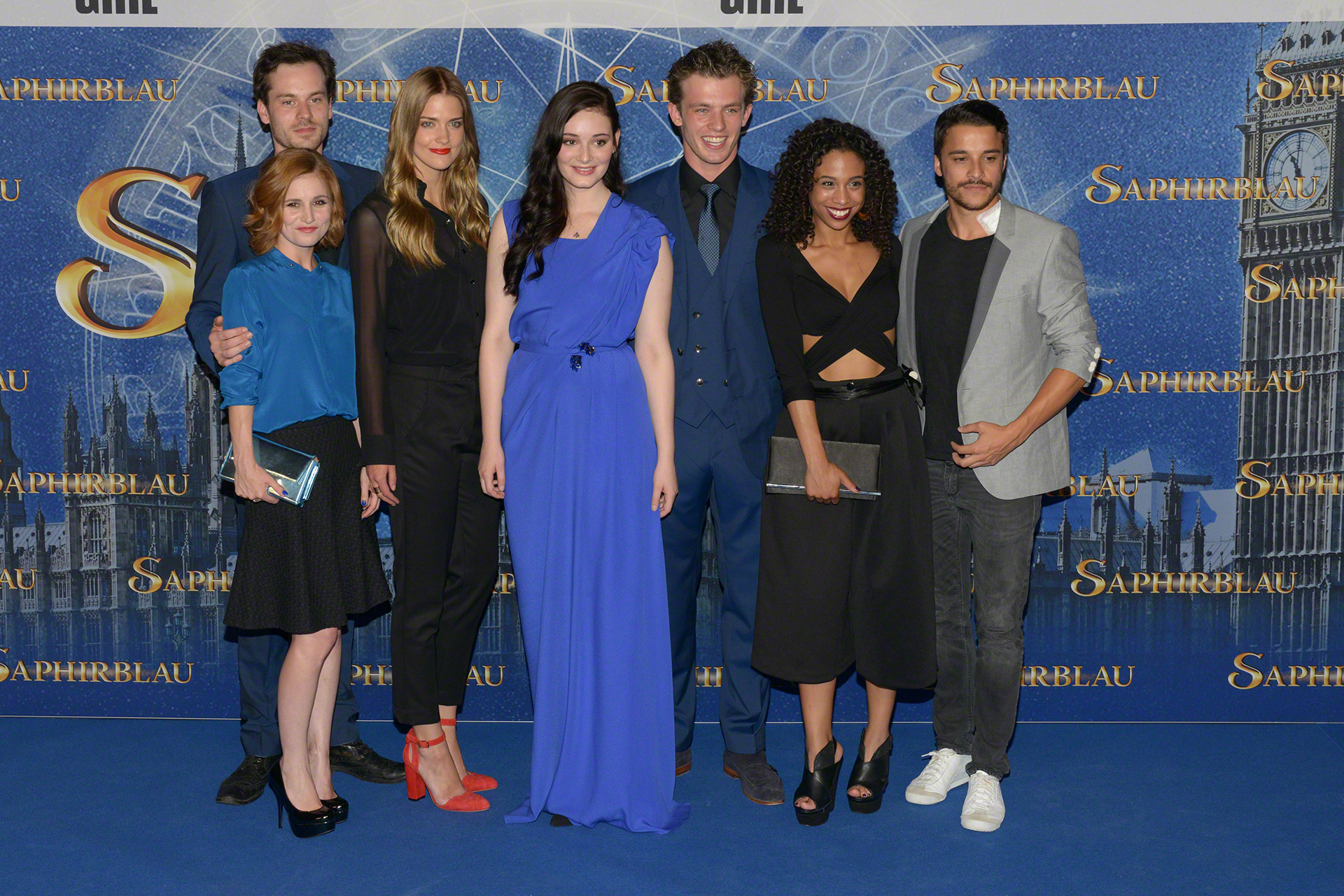
Actors from the film "Sapphire Blue" at the German premiere in the Cinedom Cologne on August 11, 2014.

Sapphire Blue (German: Saphirblau) is a German fantasy film, based on Kerstin Gier's book of the same name. It is the sequel to 2013's Ruby Red, and was followed in 2016 by Emerald Green.

== Cast ==
- Maria Ehrich as Gwendolyn Shepherd
- Jannis Niewöhner as Gideon de Villers
- Rufus Beck as Xemerius (voice only)
- Kostja Ullmann as James Pimplebottom
- Bastian Trost as Lucas Montrose
- Lion Wasczyk as Raphael de Villers
- Peter Simonischek as the Count of St. Germain
- Johannes Silberschneider as Mr. Bernhard
- Josefine Preuß as Lucy Montrose
- Florian Bartholomäi as Paul de Villers
- Veronica Ferres as Grace Shepherd
- Laura Berlin as Charlotte Montrose
- Jennifer Lotsi as Leslie Hay
- Justine del Corte as Madame Rossini
- Katharina Thalbach as Madeleine "Maddy" Montrose
- Sibylle Canonica as Glenda Montrose
- Johannes von Matuschka as Mr. Whitman
- Levin Henning as Nick Shepherd
- Oscar Ortega Sánchez as Lord Alastair
- Rolf Kanies as William de Villers

== Production ==
Filming started on October 7, 2013, and wrapped up on December 1st of the same year. Schloss Ketschendorf was used as the set for the Shepard family home.

== Reception ==
The film had a box office gross of €3.8 million domestically.
