= Nastulus =

10th-century astronomer and astrolabist

- محمد بن عبد الله نسطولس
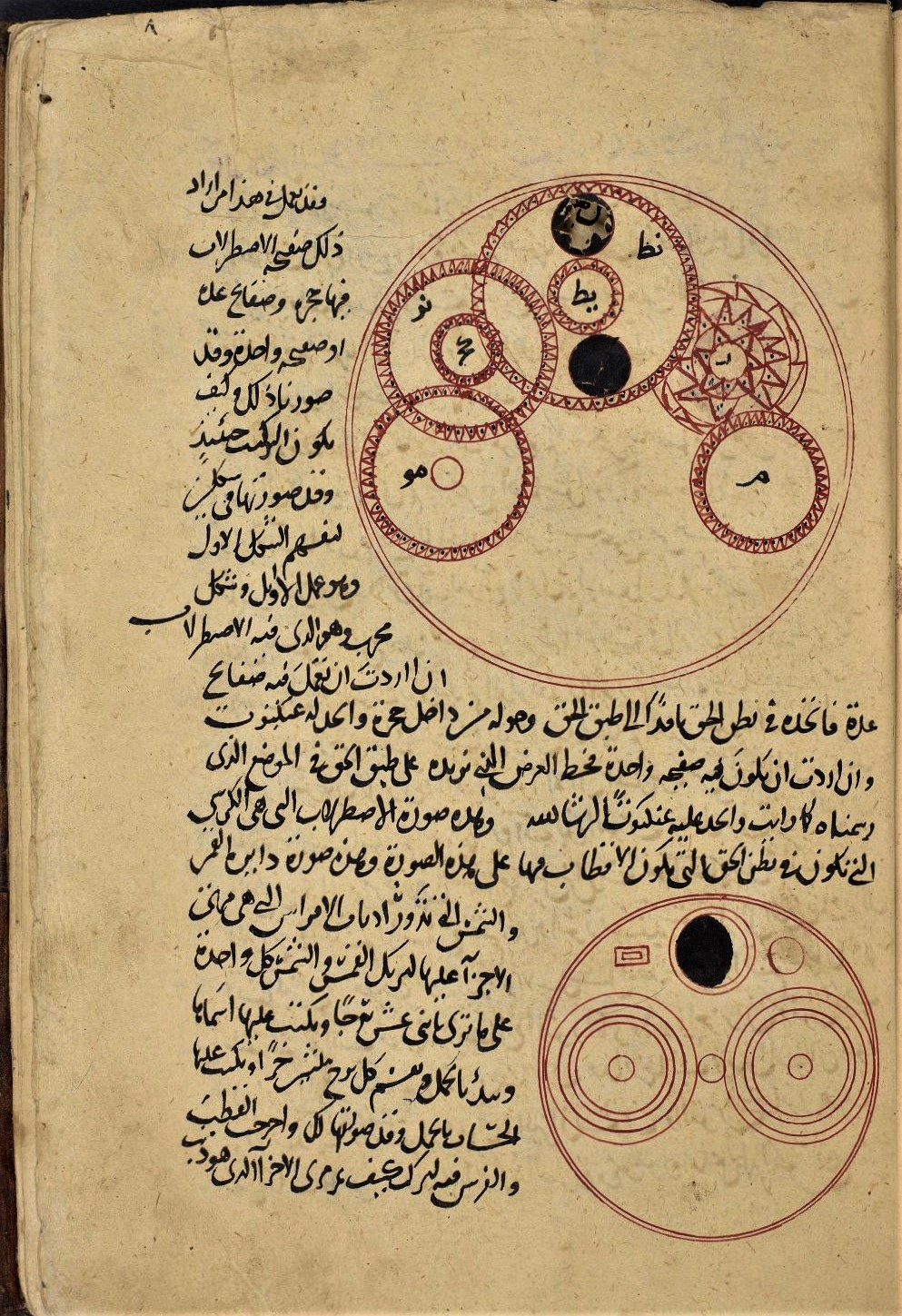
- Abū Rayhān Bīrūnī's description of Nasṭūlus’s astrolabe
- Born: fl. 10th century

Academic work
- Era: Islamic Golden Age
- Main interests: Astronomy
- Influenced: Al-ʻIjliyyah

Muḥammad ibn ʿAbd Allāh Nasṭūlus (Arabic: محمد بن عبد الله نسطولس; known as Nasṭūlus, but also referred to as Basṭūlus) was a 10th-century astronomer. He is known for making one of the oldest surviving astrolabes, dated 927/928, as well as of another partially preserved astrolabe that bears his signature, "Made by Nasṭūlus in the year 315" of hijra (925).

Very little is known about Nasṭūlus. His full name, based on a testimony given by a contemporary astronomer, Abu Sa'id al-Sijzi, indicates that he was a Muslim, but some modern historians have suggested that his foreign last name may indicate that he was Greek or Nestorian.

== Sources ==
- Dodge, Bayard (1970). The Fihrist of Al-Nadīm: A Tenth-century Survey of Muslim Culture. Columbia University Press. ISBN 978-0-231-02925-4.
- Rius, Mònica (2007). "Nasṭūlus: Muḥammad ibn ʿAbd Allāh". In Thomas Hockey; et al. (eds.). The Biographical Encyclopedia of Astronomers. New York: Springer. pp. 822–3. ISBN 9780387310220. (PDF version)
- King, David A. (1999). World Maps for Finding the Direction and Distance of Mecca: Examples of Innovation and Tradition in Islamic Science. Brill Publishers. ISBN 978-90-04-11367-1.
