= Jonathan (2016 film) =

2016 film

- Film poster
- Directed by: Piotr J. Lewandowski
- Written by: Piotr J. Lewandowski
- Starring: Jannis Niewöhner
- Music by: Lenny Mockridge
- Release dates: 12 February 2016 (Berlin); 5 May 2016 (Germany)
- Running time: 99 minutes
- Country: Germany
- Language: German

Jonathan is a 2016 German drama film directed by Piotr J. Lewandowski. It was screened in the Panorama section at the 66th Berlin International Film Festival.

== Cast ==
- Jannis Niewöhner as Jonathan
- André Hennicke as Burkhard
- Julia Koschitz as Anka
- Thomas Sarbacher as Ron
- Barbara Auer as Martha
- Max Mauff as Lasse
- Leon Seidel as Maik
