= Vikings: Valhalla =

Historical drama television series

- Also known as: Valhalla (recaps)
- Genre: Historical drama; Action; Adventure
- Created by: Jeb Stuart
- Based on: Vikings created by Michael Hirst
- Starring: Sam Corlett; Frida Gustavsson; Leo Suter; Bradley Freegard; Jóhannes Haukur Jóhannesson; Caroline Henderson; Laura Berlin; David Oakes
- Composer: Trevor Morris
- Countries of origin: Canada; Ireland; United States
- Original language: English
- No. of seasons: 3
- No. of episodes: 24

Production
- Executive producers: Jeb Stuart; Morgan O'Sullivan; Michael Hirst; Sheila Hockin; Steve Stark; James Flynn; John Weber; Niels Arden Oplev; Sherry Marsh; Alan Gasmer; Paul Buccieri
- Producers: Mark Murdoch; Cáit Collins
- Running time: 43–59 minutes
- Production companies: Metropolitan Films International; History; Toluca Pictures; MGM Television

Original release
- Network: Netflix
- Release: February 25, 2022 – July 11, 2024

Related
- Vikings

Vikings: Valhalla, or simply Valhalla, is a historical drama television series created by Jeb Stuart for Netflix that serves as a sequel to Vikings. The eight-episode first season premiered on February 25, 2022. With a 24-episode order announced in November 2019, the series was renewed for a second and third season in March 2022. The second season premiered on January 12, 2023. The third and final season premiered on July 11, 2024.

== Premise ==
Set more than 100 years after the events of Vikings; in England, tensions between the descendants of the Vikings (Norse or "Danes") and native English reach a bloody breaking point. The Norse also clash amongst themselves over conflicting Christian and pagan beliefs. The beginning of the series depicts the St. Brice's Day massacre in 1002 and covers the beginning of the end of the Viking Age.

== Cast and characters ==
=== Main ===
- Sam Corlett as Leif Erikson
- Frida Gustavsson as Freydís Eiríksdóttir
- Leo Suter as Harald Sigurdsson
- Bradley Freegard as King Canute the Great
- Jóhannes Haukur Jóhannesson as Jarl Olaf Haraldsson (seasons 1–2)
- Caroline Henderson as Jarl Estrid Haakon (season 1)
- Laura Berlin as Queen Emma
- David Oakes as Earl Godwin

=== Recurring ===
- Lujza Richter as Liv (season 1; guest season 2)
- Álfrún Laufeyjardóttir as Yrsa (season 1)
- Edward Franklin as Skarde (season 1)
- Gavan O'Connor-Duffy as Njal (season 1)
- Christopher Rygh as Agnarr
- Kenneth M. Christensen as Jarl Norí (season 1; guest season 3)
- Pääru Oja as Arne Gormsson (season 1)
- James Ballanger as Hallbjörn (seasons 1–2)
- Louis Davison as Prince / King Edmund II (season 1)
- Gavin Drea as Eadric Streona (season 1)
- Alan Devine as Cyneheard, Earl of Kent (season 1; guest season 3)
- Mark Huberman as Wulfhere, Earl of Sussex (season 1; guest seasons 2–3)
- Gavin O'Connor as Oswick, Earl of East Anglia (season 1; guest season 3)
- Martin Philips as Leofric, Earl of Northumbria (season 1)
- Asbjørn Krogh Nissen as Jarl Kåre (season 1)
- Pollyanna McIntosh as Queen Ælfgifu
- Henessi Schmidt as Princess Gytha (seasons 2–3; guest season 1)
- Charlie O'Connor (season 2; guest season 1) and Jakob Femerling Andersen (season 3) as Prince / King Svein Knutsson
- Stanislav Callas as Jorundr Torvilsson (season 2)
- Maria Guiver as Ælfwynn (season 2)
- Emily McEntire (season 2) and Amalia Holm (season 3) as Hrefna
- Aoibhinn McGinnity as Valgerda (seasons 2–3)
- Bradley James as Lord Hárekr (season 2)
- Yngvild Støen Grotmol as Lady Gudrid (season 2)
- Patrick Loftus as Kolr (season 2; guest season 3)
- Marcin Dorociński as Grand Prince Yaroslav the Wise (season 2; guest season 3)
- Hayat Kamille as Mariam (season 2)
- Taylor James as Batu (seasons 2–3)
- Kayode Akinyemi as Kaysan (seasons 2–3)
- Steven Brand as Lord Vitomir (season 2)
- Sofya Lebedeva as Eleana / Empress Zoe (seasons 2–3)
- Tolga Safer as Kurya (season 2)
- Eigil Hedegaard as Gestr (season 2)
- Ailbe Cowley as Brigtoc (season 2)
- Siobhán Callaghan as Cadlín (season 2)
- Eleanor McLynn as Dorn (seasons 2–3)
- Ruben Lawless (guest seasons 1–2) and Pyry Kähkönen (season 3) as Prince Harold Harefoot
- Stefán Haukur Jóhannesson (guest season 2) and Set Sjöstrand (season 3) as Magnus Olafsson
- Nikolai Kinski as Emperor Romanos III (season 3; guest season 2)
- Florian Munteanu as General Georgios Maniakes (season 3)
- Leander Vyvey as Stígr (season 3)
- Luke Harmon as Harald Haraldsson (season 3)
- Horatio James as Bishop Grimketel (season 3)
- Peter Claffey as Dunstan (season 3)
- Kate Bratchyna as Queen Katla (season 3)
- Cal O'Driscoll as Prince Edward (season 3)
- Henry Proctor as Prince Alfred (season 3)
- Huey O'Meara as Prince Harthacanute (season 3)
- Goran Višnjić as Erik the Red (season 3)
- Carrie Crowley as Hilde (season 3)

=== Guest ===
- Bosco Hogan as King Æthelred II (season 1)
- Wolfgang Cerny as Sten Sigurdsson (season 1)
- Yvonne Mai as Merin (season 1)
- Jack Mullarkey as Toke (season 1)
- Sam Stafford as Ulf (season 1)
- Frank Blake as Birger (season 1)
- Leifur Sigurðarson as Gunnar Magnússon (season 1)
- Julian Seager as Jarl Gorm (season 1)
- Bill Murphy as Øgda (season 1)
- Jaakko Ohtonen as Johan (season 1)
- Robert McCormack as Tomas (season 1)
- Ethan Dillon as Vestian (season 1; guest season 3)
- John Kavanagh as The Seer
- Annabelle Mandeng as Altöra (season 1)
- Søren Pilmark as King Sweyn Forkbeard
- Stephen Hogan as Sigeferth (season 1)
- Jack Hickey as Richard II, Duke of Normandy (seasons 1, 3)
- Owen J. Barton as Osparkr (season 2)
- Barry Calvert as Thorgills (season 2)
- Ciaran McMahon as Hamundr (seasons 2–3)
- Jade O'Connor as Gunn (seasons 2–3)
- Eoghain Francis Kiernan as Áki (seasons 2–3)
- Sharon McCoy as Skögul (seasons 2–3)
- Margarita Grillis as Bekkhild (seasons 2–3)
- Dan Poole as Baggi (season 2)
- Uriel Emil as Tyrach (season 2)
- Stany Coppet as The Khan of the Pechenegs (season 2)
- Christian Vit as The Emir (season 3)
- Cosimo Fusco as The Cardinal (season 3)
- Paul Ward as Pope John XIX (season 3)
- Kevork Malikyan as Mehmet (season 3)
- Christopher Sciueref as The Patriarch (season 3)
- Ely Solan as William, Duke of Normandy (season 3)
- Keith McErlean as Walter (season 3)
- James Collins as Harold Godwinson (season 3)
- Cooper Murray as Tostig Godwinson (season 3)
- Sónia Balacó as Tamar (season 3)
- Lucas Dutra as Niketas (season 3)
- Najib Oudghiri as Calinicus (season 3)
- Keith Murphy as Lang (season 3)

== Episodes ==
Season	Episodes	Originally released
1	8	February 25, 2022
2	8	January 12, 2023
3	8	July 11, 2024

=== Season 1 (2022) ===
No. overall	No. in season	Title	Directed by	Written by	Original release date
1	1	"The Greenlanders"	Niels Arden Oplev	Jeb Stuart	February 25, 2022
In the Danelaw, a region of England settled by Vikings, it is Saint Brice's Day and Harald Sigurdsson leaves for Norway. Meanwhile, King Æthelred II, the ruler of England, orders all Danish settlers in England to be killed, including Harald's brother Sten Sigurdsson. King Canute, the ruler of Denmark, calls all Viking warriors to meet in Kattegat to form an army to exact revenge. Greenlanders Leif Erikson and Freydís Eiríksdóttir travel to Kattegat through a great storm, unaware of the massacre, as Freydís seeks revenge on the man who raped and scarred her years earlier. She soon discovers the man responsible, Gunnar Magnússon, a follower of Harald's older half-brother Jarl Olaf Haraldsson, a devout Christian, who doesn't trust pagans. Leif later defends himself due to the reputation of his infamous father Erik the Red and Harald promises him glory if Leif joins his forces in England. Later that night, Freydís sneaks into the great hall and kills Gunnar. Before an enraged Olaf can kill Freydís, Jarl Estrid Haakon, the ruler of Kattegat, stops him. Harald defends Freydís's actions and she reveals a cruciform scar on her back. Haakon states that she will render judgment in the morning.
2	2	"Viking"	Steve Saint Leger	Jeb Stuart	February 25, 2022
Freydís challenges Olaf to a trial by combat but is denied. Instead, Harald has Leif join him in England to help exact revenge on the Saxons. Freydís bids farewell to Leif before he and the majority of the Greenlanders leave Kattegat with Canute's Viking army. Haakon sends Freydís to Uppsala, so that she may seek her destiny. During the journey to England, Jarl Gorm, one of the Viking leaders, and his son Arne Gormsson grow distrustful of Leif. Gorm later attacks him, killing the Greenlander Birger, which results in Leif killing Gorm just as they arrive on England's shores. In England, Æthelred and his advisor Godwin discuss the imminent Viking invasion as Æthelred's health deteriorates. Æthelred's wife, Queen Emma, later visits her now bedridden husband, who warns her that London needs to be defended. Emma sends her step-son Prince Edmund, the heir to the throne of England, to seek aid from the ealdorman of Mercia, Eadric Streona. Edmund is successful in convincing Streona to supply Mercian soldiers to help repel the Vikings but on his return to London, bells toll, signaling Æthelred's death.
3	3	"The Marshes"	Steve Saint Leger	Vanessa Alexander	February 25, 2022
The Viking army sack Kent and they learn of Æthelred's death, so they now set their sights on his son. The army later makes camp near London, as Leif and Harald lead a scouting party into the nearby marshes. They are soon ambushed by Mercian soldiers and are forced to retreat, whilst the Greenlander Ulf is killed, and Leif is left behind. Harald later returns and saves Leif before they make their way onto the bridge to London, where they discover that it has a drawbridge in its center. In London, Edmund practices his fighting skills whilst Godwin teaches him that he must be more ruthless to win a real battle. Edmund successfully gets the full support of the ealdormen who wish to move forward with his coronation and Edmund is crowned King of England. In Sweden, Freydís and several other pilgrims are attacked by a berserker who kills the Greenlander Toke and seriously wounds Yrsa. Freydís kills the attacker and brings Yrsa to a healer's hut before continuing her journey to Uppsala alone. Sometime later, the Christian zealot Jarl Kåre finds the body of the berserker and begins to follow a trail of blood left by Yrsa.
4	4	"The Bridge"	Steve Saint Leger	Declan Croghan	February 25, 2022
The Viking leaders discuss their impending assault on London by using the bridge to their advantage and drawing out Edmund. Meanwhile, Edmund discusses his plans for the defense of London with Streona, who will outflank the Vikings and trap them on the bridge. Whilst impressed by the king's strategy, Streona states that the Mercians will suffer heavy losses, but Edmund promises him that Mercia will have all the glory if they're victorious. As the Viking army arrives outside London, Canute taunts Edmund into charging into battle alongside his soldiers, against the advice of Emma and Godwin. Vikings and Saxons clash until Canute leads the Saxons into an ambush on the far side of the bridge. Meanwhile, Leif, Harald, and several others successfully weaken the drawbridge, attach ropes to its supports, and use Olaf's longships to pull it down. Emma notices the Viking's plan and commands Saxon archers to fire at the saboteurs, killing the Greenlanders Skarde and Njal. Godwin informs Edmund of the bridge's impending collapse, but Edmund fails to cross in time and is trapped, forcing him to surrender. Streona arrives to witness the Saxon army's defeat and decides to abandon Edmund.
5	5	"Miracle"	Hannah Quinn	Eoin McNamee	February 25, 2022
The Viking army successfully conquers London, taking Emma and the other nobles captive. Harald attempts to exact his revenge by executing Edmund but is stopped by Canute. He later promises to make Harald the king of Norway and reveals that Olaf has a secret son, Magnus Olafsson. Meanwhile, Leif discovers that Liv has survived the battle and the two become romantically involved. He mourns the deaths of his fellow Greenlanders, giving them a Viking funeral, but has a crisis of faith. During a celebratory feast, Canute awards his warriors the spoils of war and releases Leif from his sister's debt. Canute then executes Streona for breaking his oath to Edmund and crowns himself the first Viking King of England, who will rule alongside Edmund. He also befriends Emma and rescues her two children who had been taken captive by Olaf. In Uppsala, Freydís takes part in a pagan ceremony that provides a glimpse into her past. During a vision, she is visited by The Seer who gives her a cryptic warning. Kåre arrives at the healer's hut seeking vengeance and kills Yrsa. Freydís then awakens from her vision and leaves Uppsala.
6	6	"The Last Daughter of Uppsala"	Hannah Quinn	Vanessa Alexander	February 25, 2022
Freydís reaches the healer's hut and confronts Kåre who tells her to warn Haakon that he is coming to kill them all. Freydís returns to Kattegat and trains to become a shieldmaiden with Altöra, Haakon's second-in-command. Haakon recounts her own vision of The Seer and claims that Freydís is the "Last Daughter of Uppsala". Meanwhile, Kåre reaches Uppsala and receives his own mysterious vision from The Seer. Olaf leaves England with his forces and heads to Denmark whilst Leif and Harald return to Kattegat. In Denmark, Olaf asks Canute's Mercian wife, Queen Ælfgifu, for her support in becoming the ruler of Norway. Harald's forces soon arrive in Kattegat and Leif, Freydís and Liv reunite, now the only remaining Greenlanders. Freydís later beats Altöra in single combat and becomes a shieldmaiden by pledging herself to protect Kattegat. In London, Canute makes Godwin and Emma his advisors, with the latter informing him that the ealdormen are close to rebellion. Canute takes the ealdormen captive and reveals to them that he will restore their titles in return for their loyalty. Canute and Emma later become romantically involved but Canute becomes concerned after receiving a letter from Denmark.
7	7	"Choices"	David Frazee	Declan Croghan	February 25, 2022
Kåre sends the corpses of the priests of Uppsala to Kattegat as a warning. Leif, Freydís, and Harald head to Uppsala and witness the aftermath of Kåre's massacre with the survivors claiming that Kåre's God ordered him to destroy all pagans. Olaf meets with Kåre and they forge an alliance to take Kattegat in an effort to unite Norway. Harald learns of this, and his forces help Haakon prepare for Olaf and Kåre's arrival. In London, Edmund discovers that Canute has left England to fight the Wends in Denmark, but not before marrying Emma in secret. Canute's father, King Sweyn Forkbeard, arrives to rule in his place with Forkbeard's granddaughter Princess Gytha serving as Emma's lady-in-waiting. Edmund and Forkbeard are confronted by Sigeferth, the ealdorman of Wessex, who is later killed by Forkbeard after insulting him, and Godwin is made the first earl of Wessex. Angered by Forkbeard's presence, Edmund attempts to form a resistance, but Godwin betrays him by setting a trap and stabs him in the heart, leaving Canute as the sole King of England. Ælfgifu arrives in London, bringing with her Canute's fleet, and threatens Forkbeard that she will order it to aid Olaf and his conquest.
8	8	"The End of the Beginning"	David Frazee	Eoin McNamee	February 25, 2022
To prevent Ælfgifu from sending Canute's fleet to Olaf, Forkbeard seemingly banishes Emma to Normandy. Ælfgifu and Godwin then travel to Mercia and convince the Mercians to give Forkbeard their support. However, in Ælfgifu's absence, Forkbeard locates Canute's fleet and Emma retakes the throne of England. In Norway, Harald chooses to side with Olaf but secretly informs Leif of Olaf's attack plan. As the Battle for Kattegat begins, Kåre's forces assault the city walls, and whilst defending Kattegat, Haakon, Altöra, and Arne are killed by Kåre's followers. Obsessed with killing Freydís, Kåre hunts her down to the great hall but she outmaneuvers and beheads him. Knowing his brother would betray him, Olaf's attack plan is revealed to have been a ruse to weaken both Haakon and Kåre's forces. Olaf's army arrives in Kattegat with little resistance and Olaf mortally wounds Liv who dies in Leif's arms. Harald is wounded during the battle, but Freydís comes to his aid and they flee. Olaf claims victory, but after Forkbeard arrives with Canute's fleet, Olaf's forces quickly abandon Kattegat. Forkbeard's grandson Prince Harold Harefoot then discovers several of Kåre's followers slaughtered and an enraged Leif covered in blood.

=== Season 2 (2023) ===
No. overall	No. in season	Title	Directed by	Written by	Original release date
9	1	"The Web of Fate"	Ciaran Donnelly	Jeb Stuart	January 12, 2023
Following the Battle for Kattegat, Forkbeard's forces capture Olaf and his surviving men. Leif hunts for Olaf with the hope of avenging Liv's death and whilst in Kattegat, meets Jorundr Torvilsson, a mysterious stranger. To prevent his own execution, Olaf strikes a deal with Forkbeard that keeps his captive son Magnus alive in exchange for Olaf helping advise Canute's eldest son, Prince Svein Knutsson, to rule as King of Norway with Ælfgifu as regent. Forkbeard's forces then depart from Kattegat. In London, Godwin grows concerned regarding Emma's safety due to Canute's continued absence and successfully prevents an assassination attempt. Meanwhile, Freydís and Harald are in hiding and learn that many pagans now revere Freydís whilst Jomsvikings are taking them to Jomsborg for safety. They soon reunite with Leif who had tracked down bounty hunters sent to kill Harald. Jorundr, having followed Leif, reveals that he's a Jomsviking and agrees to help them escape. They successfully evade Olaf's forces, are rescued by Jorundr's longships and Freydís secretly reveals to Leif that she is pregnant with Harald's child. Leif and Harald then depart, hoping to get aid from Harald's uncle in Novgorod whilst Freydís sails for Jomsborg.
10	2	"Towers of Faith"	Ciaran Donnelly	Declan Croghan	January 12, 2023
In Norway, Olaf hunts down escaping pagans and has Svein kill one of them. Upon returning to Kattegat, Olaf meets with Ælfgifu who grows concerned for Svein's safety. In London, Godwin tortures the captured assassin, but he is later secretly killed to prevent Godwin from discovering who sent him. In Jomsborg, Freydís arrives and meets its rulers, Lord Hárekr and Lady Gudrid, who hope to turn Jomsborg into a "new Uppsala" with Freydís as their gyðja. In Novgorod, Leif and Harald arrive and meet with Harald's uncle, Grand Prince Yaroslav the Wise, and Lord Vitomir. However, Yaroslav refuses to aid Harald so he can continue trading with Canute's empire whilst the trade route to Constantinople is blocked by invading Pechenegs. Leif meets Mariam, an Astrolabe maker, and has vivid hallucinations of Liv. Hoping to buy an army with gold, Harald fights against the African warrior Kaysan, but despite Harald's victory, Kaysan and his partner Batu flee with the winnings. Impressed by Harald's fighting ability, Vitomir agrees to pay him to help escort precious cargo past the Pechenegs. In an attempt to hallucinate Liv once more, Leif takes opium and after nearly falling to his death, he collapses.
11	3	"Pieces of the Gods"	Monika Mitchell	Vanessa Alexander	January 12, 2023
Leif awakens in Mariam's lodgings, having been rescued from the cold, and discovers that she is terminally ill. Harald meets with Gestr, a slaver, and agrees to protect his boat on the journey to Constantinople but must first find a crew. He recruits the warrior Kaysan, con man Batu, and the blind Pecheneg Kurya who can guide them along the Dnieper River. Leif invites Miriam to join them whilst Vitomir and his servant Eleana join the crew carrying a precious silver chest. Together, the crew leaves Novgorod on a sled but shortly after beginning their journey, one of Gestr's slaves dies from the cold. In London, Emma discovers that Ælfwynn, one of her ladies-in-waiting and Godwin's lover, is the sister of the assassin and that Godwin has proposed marriage. In Jomsborg, many of the pagan refugees are forced into labor while Hárekr goes raiding, leaving his nephew Jorundr in charge. Hrefna, a young girl who idolizes Freydís, is tricked by Jorundr to journey alone to a nearby boneyard to prove her worth. Freydís finds Hrefna injured and defends her from a wild boar, before returning her home.
12	4	"The Thaw"	Monika Mitchell	Eoin McNamee	January 12, 2023
In Kievan Rus', the crew journeys along a frozen river until it breaks and the sled becomes trapped. Whilst the sled is eventually freed, the ice dam that kept the river frozen has since thawed. The crew is forced to release the boat from the sled but both Eleana and Vitomir fall through the ice. Only Eleana can be saved in time as Vitomir drowns and Eleana is revealed to be his daughter. In Kattegat, Olaf receives word that Harald has met with their uncle in Novgorod and plans to travel there with Svein. In London, Emma imprisons Ælfwynn and she is tortured by Canute's huscarl Agnarr for information about her brother and Godwin. Ælfwynn reveals that Godwin wishes for his future children to rule England as she succumbs to her wounds. Emma informs Godwin of Ælfwynn's death and Gytha confides in him. In Jomsborg, Gudrid chastises Jorundr for mixing with the pagan refugees and becomes suspicious of the now heavily pregnant Freydís, who wishes for the refugees to be treated as equals. Hárekr returns from raiding and angered by Freydís' actions, commands the Jomsvikings to massacre the refugees and imprisons both Jorundr and Freydís.
13	5	"Birth and Rebirth"	Jan Matthys	Niall Queenan	January 12, 2023
On the Dnieper River, the boat's rudder breaks, forcing the crew to stop. Leif and Harald travel to nearby ruins and smith a new rudder as Leif tells Harald about Freydís' pregnancy. A lone Varangian, Baggi, discovers the grounded boat and recognizes Kurya as the disgraced brother of the Pecheneg Khan before departing. A paranoid Gestr is then overthrown and locked inside the boat. Baggi later returns with several others, and they fight with the crew. As Leif and Harald arrive, Baggi and his men are killed and Gestr is stabbed to death by his slaves. In London, Emma prays for forgiveness for having caused Ælfwynn's death as Godwin and Gytha mourn her. Agnarr informs Emma that Godwin paid a large sum of money to a man known as "The Bear" days before her attempted assassination. Imprisoned in Jomsborg, Freydís gives birth to a son, who she names Harald. Hárekr immediately takes the child to claim as his own, angering the neglected Jorundr. Hárekr tells Jorundr that he must kill Freydís to regain his trust. However, Jorundr rescues the baby and helps fake Freydís' death before escaping Jomsborg. Hárekr soon intercepts them and Freydís is forced to flee alone.
14	6	"Leap of Faith"	Jan Matthys	Niall Queenan	January 12, 2023
In Sussex, Emma and Agnarr search for "The Bear" only to discover that he has been killed, although they find Godwin's father's ring. Canute returns to London and doubtful that Godwin is behind the assassination attempt, betroths his niece Gytha to him. In Novgorod, Olaf meets with Yaroslav and promises to stop the Jomsvikings from raiding the Baltic trade routes. In Jomsborg, Hrefna helps a weakened Freydís recover. Jorundr is put on trial, and after Hárekr frames him for Freydís' death, the Jomsborg elders decide to have Jorundr's right hand removed before he's exiled. Freydís later challenges Hárekr, who easily defeats her, but the Jomsvikings revolt and stone him to death, allowing Freydís to be reunited with her son. On the Dnieper River, after reaching a large waterfall, only Harald wants to keep going. Leif becomes romantically involved with Miriam who plans to eventually ingest poison to end her suffering as her illness has worsened. Eleana tells Harald that Vitomir was bringing the precious cargo to Constantinople to stop raids on their home in Chude. Harald then removes most of the cargo and the mast from the ship and together the crew heads over the waterfall.
15	7	"Pecheneg"	Emer Conroy	Vanessa Alexander	January 12, 2023
Having landed downstream of the waterfall, the crew is scattered. A group of Pechenegs find the grounded boat and capture Harald. The rest of the crew reunite and discover that Cadlín, one of the former slaves, didn't survive the fall. Harald is brought before Tyrach, a Pecheneg leader, who tortures him until Leif arrives with Kurya and Tyrach sends word to the Khan of his brother's return. Eleana and the former slaves Brigtoc and Dorn soon free Leif and Harald, who kill Tyrach, but the group is forced to flee when the Khan's forces arrive. They reach the boat and return it to the water but Kurya remains behind to confront his brother and kills him with Miriam's poison. Before Kurya can be dismembered by the Khan's vengeful men, Leif shoots him with an arrow out of mercy. Departing from Novgorod, Olaf begins his search for Jomsborg after his ambitions are renewed when he's blessed by a Bishop. In Jomsborg, Freydís brings the Jomsvikings and pagan refugees together, allowing them to worship in the previously restricted temple, whilst Gudrid regrets allowing Jorundr's exile. Alone and dying at sea, Jorundr is discovered by Olaf.
16	8	"The Reckoning"	Emer Conroy	Declan Croghan	January 12, 2023
Olaf's forces arrive in Pomerania, and Olaf tells Jorundr about his father which convinces him to reveal Jomsborg's location. Olaf soon meets with Freydís to taunt her whilst Gudrid gives Jorundr a secret message. Jorundr then leads Hallbjörn, Olaf's second-in-command, to an ambush at Jomsborg's sentinel and they kill each other. Olaf's forces attack Jomsborg but Freydís leads them into a trap, burning them all alive. An enraged Olaf battles Freydís until she impales him with a spear, killing him, and leaving Svein as the sole survivor. Freydís later brings Svein to Kattegat in exchange for peace with Ælfgifu. In London, despite Emma's protests, Godwin and Gytha are married, putting their future children in line for the throne of England. Hoping to torment Godwin, Emma gifts Gytha the ring she recovered from Sussex to act as a constant reminder of Godwin's father's shameful past. On the Dnieper River, Mariam's condition forces the crew to stop. Alone with Leif, she gifts him the key to her home in Constantinople before succumbing to her illness. The Byzantine Emperor, Romanos III, meets the crew, revealing Eleana as his betrothed and Harald gains his favor. Their journey complete, the crew finally reaches Constantinople.

=== Season 3 (2024) ===
No. overall	No. in season	Title	Directed by	Written by	Original release date
17	1	"Seven Years Later"	David Frazee	Rachel Kilfeather	July 11, 2024
Seven years later, Harald and Leif are fighting the Saracens in Sicily to capture the fortress of Syracuse. They are led by General Maniakes but have not been able to capture it in the six months of the siege. Harald tells Emperor Romanos that his Varangians can take the fortress. Leif shows Harald the tunnel that they have been digging under the Saracen wall where a secret tunnel filled with explosives branches off from the main tunnel. Their plan works and the secret tunnel collapses when the Saracens pour oil into it by mistake, allowing the Emperor's army to gain access to the fortress. Meanwhile in Jomsborg, Freydis is raising her and Harald's son, also called Harald, by herself and is the leader of the settlement. She is impressed with Stígr, a healer who is a new arrival at the settlement, and by his martial arts style skills which he claims to have learned during his travels in India. Freydis asks him to teach Harald and later, they sleep together. In Rome, King Canute and Queen Emma, along with Godwin, try to make a deal with the Pope. Godwin tries to bribe the Pope's Cardinal but Emma tells him it will not help them in the long term.
18	2	"Honour and Dishonour"	David Frazee	Jessica Sinyard	July 11, 2024
The Emir of Syracuse asks for a one-on-one fight, with the winner taking the fortress, and the Emperor accepts. Harald fights on the Emperor's behalf against the Emir himself and wins; Emperor Romanos offers the people of Syracuse mercy. Leif goes to the library of the fortress and finds a map he had been looking for years. Maniakes goes to Leif's tent and sees the explosive powder he used to destroy the fortress wall; he uses it to kill the people of Syracuse after the Emperor has left, with Leif arriving too late to stop Maniakes. In Jomsborg, people start falling sick; Stígr discovers that the flour they received from Kattegat has been laced with poisonous mushrooms. He makes a cure and is able to save a few, including Freydis and young Harald, but it is too late to save many of the other residents. Magnus Olafsson arrives in Kattegat with a group of priests and requests the permission of King Svein and his mother Queen Ælfgifu to build a shrine to his father as well as to go to Jomsborg and negotiate with Freydis to get back his father's bones; however Ælfgifu is suspicious of Magnus, since he is next in line after her son Svein to the throne of Norway. It is revealed that it was Magnus who poisoned the flour traded with Jomsborg. In Rome, Emma tries to meet the Pope by revealing to the Cardinal that she knows Godwin bribed him. When that does not work, they have the Cardinal killed and secure the deal with the Pope through threats.
19	3	"Lost"	Hannah Quinn	Delinda Jacobs	July 11, 2024
The Byzantine army returns to Constantinople, but Leif is traumatised by the use of his invention to slaughter the Syracuse civilians. Both Maniakes and Harald are awarded the title Spatharokandidatos by the Empress Zoe (formerly Eleana) which is the highest title awarded to warriors. It is revealed that Harald now has enough money to raise an army to take the throne of Norway and is secretly having an affair with Zoe. Harald finds Leif destroying his collection of scrolls to stop their contents being used to harm the innocent. Leif decides to leave for Corfu to locate the mapmaker who drew the map he found in Syracuse. King Canute and Queen Emma visit Emma's brother and her sons from her first husband, Edward and Alfred, in Normandy. Their own son Harthacanute and the Duke of Normandy, William, who is Emma's great-nephew, are also present. Godwin arrives in Denmark to meet Canute's father, King Forkbeard and his own wife Gytha and their two sons who introduce him to Harald Harefoot, the second son of Canute and Ælfgifu, who harbours ambitions to become the next king of England. During the Midsomar festival, they are attacked by Wends and, seeing Harald fight bravely, Godwin agrees to help him become king. In Jomsborg, Freydis has a vision of a land with golden trees and hears The Seer calling out to her. She mulls on whether to leave Jomsborg and find the land in her visions with Stígr. Magnus soon approaches and she makes a plan to save her people.
20	4	"The End of Jomsborg"	Hannah Quinn	Alex Straker	July 11, 2024
Freydis and the people of Jomsborg make funerary shrines; a spy reports this to Magnus, who thinks his plan has worked. Magnus finds his father's axe and Freydis, disguised as a dying woman, tells him that Freydis died of the sickness. She shows him the way to his father's grave but escapes when they reach the site, pursued by Magnus. Simultaneously, the people escape on Magnus's ships; Magnus's men follow in a third ship but most are killed and the ship sunk by a rock fall triggered at Freydis's command. Harald and Zoe are almost caught by Romanos but escape. Harald's uncle Yaroslav comes to petition the emperor for troops and privately tells Harald to raise an army and take the throne of Norway. Leif makes it to Greece and saves a nun, Tamar, and helps her re-build a church. After talking with her, he is finally able to forgive himself for what happened in Syracuse and continues his journey. In Normandy, Canute gives William valuable advice on gaining and keeping a throne. In Denmark, Godwin informs Canute's father King Forkbeard of Canute's dealings with the Pope.
21	5	"Greenland"	Jan Matthys	Katie Baxendale	July 11, 2024
Freydis and her people reach her father Erik the Red's settlement in Greenland. Their settlement is also struggling but Freydis brings them enough food for the summer. Erik tries to convince her to stay but Freydis tells him she means to sail west to find the golden land. In Corfu, Leif finds the mapmaker Calinicus and learns about currents as well as the spherical nature of the earth. Calinicus fits the map which Leif brought into a larger map which shows the golden land. In London, Canute realises he is ill and may die soon. He tells Emma to gather all their sons in Kattegat so that he can choose a successor. In Denmark, Forkbeard tells Godwin that he intends to take the throne of England after Canute's death. Harefoot reacts angrily to this. But after listening to the story of how Forkbeard killed his own father, he smothers Forkbeard in his bed with Godwin's help. In Constantinople, during a masked ball, Romanos tells Harald he knew about his affair with Zoe. He tells him that he encouraged it because he could not have children and needed a child to rule after him. As they talk, a woman takes out a knife and kills the Emperor. Maniakes bursts in and arrests Harald for murdering the Emperor.
22	6	"Return to Kattegat"	Jan Matthys	Dana Fainaru	July 11, 2024
Leif comes to Jomsborg to see Freydis but finds it abandoned. King Canute and Queen Emma arrive in Kattegat with their sons and meet Queen Ælfgifu, along with King Svein and his pregnant wife Queen Katla. Emma informs Ælfgifu that Canute is dying and is going to choose a successor. Harefoot and Godwin arrive as well and inform them of Forkbeard's death. Leif makes his way to Kattegat and Canute offers him a ship and crew to find the golden land, since Leif hadn't asked for anything after helping take London Bridge. In Greenland, Erik tries to unite the two groups. Freydis offers her father supplies, seeds and a ship but firmly tells him that they are leaving. Erik kills the captain of Freydis's ship, Aki, in secret and kidnaps Freydis's son Harald. In Constantinople, Zoe tells Harald that Maniakes turned his prosecution for Romanos's murder over to the church so she won't be able to pardon him. She apologises to him about her affair. During the trial, Maniakes accuses Harald and Zoe of plotting the murder of the Emperor together and tries to have one of Harald's friends, Batu, be a witness against him. Harald claims that he raped Zoe and then killed Romanos when the Emperor confronted him, thereby saving Zoe and Batu. Harald is sentenced to execution and is sent to an island prison where he sees the bodies of his friends Kaysan, Batu and Dorn, executed for protecting Harald.
23	7	"Hardrada"	Emer Conroy	Daisy Martey	July 11, 2024
In Greenland, Freydis finds Aki's body and demands justice when she confronts her father Erik over the murder. However, Erik tells her if she kills him, she will never see Harald again and locks her in a storehouse. Hilde, Freydis's mother, tells Stígr that Harald is with Kalaallit people in the north; Stígr leaves to find Harald while Freydis escapes and goes to Kattegat with the traders to get a ship. In Constantinople, Maniakes makes himself Emperor and gives Zoe two options: marry him and remain Empress or be killed and replaced; Zoe chooses to marry Maniakes. Meanwhile, Harald feeds the crows in the prison some bread soaked in wine and, when they are unconscious, ties strings to their feet which he sets on fire. The crows flee to their nests, which then catch fire and set the roof of the prison ablaze. Harald frees himself in the chaos and kills Maniakes in one-on-one combat. Magnus reaches Kattegat, kills one of his men, destroys his face and proclaims it to be the uncorrupted body of his father; he then forces Bishop Grimketel to lie for him. He meets Canute and Leif and goes to northern Norway. Bishop Grimketel tells Leif that Freydis was poisoned in Jomsborg by Magnus. Meanwhile, Canute appoints his successors: Svein to continue ruling Norway, Harthacanute to rule Denmark with Harefoot as his regent, and Emma to rule England. Canute and Emma make their peace with Ælfgifu and return to England, with Harthacanute and Harefoot going to Denmark and Emma's sons Edward and Alfred returning to Normandy.
24	8	"Destinies"	Emer Conroy	Declan Croghan	July 11, 2024
Leif rides north to find Magnus, however he meets Harald who has reached Norway and has gained the support of some of the nobles. Freydis reaches Kattegat and meets Ælfgifu and Katla, who tells them of the ship being built for Leif on Canute's orders. Svein and his men go after Magnus, however Magnus turns the men against Svein and kills him. He then comes to Kattegat and kills Ælfgifu and tries to kill Katla, but Katla makes a deal with Magnus to give up Freydis in return for letting her and her unborn child live. Freydis is captured by Magnus just as Harald and Leif arrive. The nobles' decision is to have Magnus and Harald co-rule Norway but Magnus will only consent to it if Freydis is killed. Harald seemingly agrees but secretly forms a plan with Leif to save Freydis. During Freydis' execution, Leif places the powder he had invented to capture Syracuse all over Kattegat and has Freydis escape in the confusion. Harald and Freydis admit their affection for each other but realise that their destinies have taken them along different paths. Harald expresses his hope of meeting his son one day. In Greenland, Stígr finds the cave where Harald lives with the Kalaallit people but is stabbed by a Greenlander sent by Eric to kill him, however, Stígr survives. In England, Canute dies and a Christian Mass is held for him; however, Emma secretly gives him a Viking funeral. Emma asks Godwin to bring her son Edward to make him the next king, however Godwin brings Harefoot instead, who is crowned king; Emma flirts with him and starts to manipulate him, to Godwin's dismay. Freydis and Leif sail out to pick up their people in Greenland and find the golden land. Harald imprisons Magnus and dares his supporters to challenge him; no-one does and he becomes the sole ruler of Norway taking the name "Harald Hardrada".

== Production ==
=== Development ===
On January 4, 2019, alongside the announcement that Vikings would end after its sixth season, it was announced that Michael Hirst and MGM Television were developing a spin-off series with writer Jeb Stuart. On November 19, 2019, it was announced that this series, titled Vikings: Valhalla, would take place a century after the end of the original series and would be released on Netflix. The 24-episode series was made by MGM Television, and filmed primarily in Ireland, working from the same Ashford Studios in County Wicklow. The series focuses "on the adventures of Leif Erikson, Freydís Eiríksdóttir and Harald Sigurdsson".

On March 9, 2022, the series was officially renewed for a second and third season. On November 21, 2022, it was announced that the second season would premiere on January 12, 2023. On June 12, 2024, it was announced that the third and final season would premiere on July 11, 2024.

=== Casting ===
In November 2020, it was reported that Jóhannes Haukur Jóhannesson, Frida Gustavsson, and David Oakes had been cast in the series. Gustavsson was later revealed to have been cast as Freydís Eiríksdóttir and Oakes as Godwin while Jóhannesson had been cast as Olaf Haraldsson though earlier reports stated that he had been cast as Harald Sigurdsson, a part later given to Leo Suter. Sam Corlett, Bradley Freegard, Laura Berlin and Caroline Henderson rounded out the main cast as Leif Erikson, King Canute, Queen Emma and Jarl Estrid Haakon respectively. Pollyanna McIntosh and Asbjørn Krogh Nissen were cast in the supporting roles of Queen Ælfgifu and Jarl Kåre.

In May 2022, Florian Munteanu was announced to be portraying General Georgios Maniakes in the third season. In June, Goran Višnjić was also announced to be portraying Erik the Red in the third season. In November, new cast members for the second season were announced that included Bradley James as Lord Hárekr, Hayat Kamille as Mariam, Marcin Dorocinski as Grand Prince Yaroslav the Wise, Sofya Lebedeva as Eleana, Tolga Safer as Kurya, and Stanislav Callas as Jorundr.

=== Writers ===
Showrunner Jeb Stuart's writing team includes Vanessa Alexander, Declan Croghan and Eoin McNamee. The first episode was directed by Niels Arden Oplev.

=== Filming ===
Vikings: Valhalla started filming in October 2020 at Ashford Studios, Wicklow, where the previous series Vikings was filmed. Shooting was suspended due to a number of positive COVID-19 tests, only to resume after a few days. At the time a number of cast and crew were reported to have tested positive; however, it emerged that the production had received a number of false positive tests. Directors for the first season included the BAFTA-winning Danish director Niels Arden Oplev, Steve Saint Leger, who directed several episodes of Vikings, and Hannah Quinn.

Filming later resumed at Ashford Studios in August 2021 and production on the second season wrapped later that year in November.

Production on the third season began in May 2022 and wrapped later that year in October. Some of the filming occurred in Croatia.

=== Music ===
The musical score for the first season was composed by Trevor Morris. Amalie Bruun of Myrkur provided the kulning vocals for the opening credits. The series also made heavy use of music from the album The Word as Power by Lustmord, which was also featured in Season 6 of Vikings.

== Reception ==
=== Critical response ===
The review aggregator website Rotten Tomatoes reports a 90% approval rating for the first season based on 29 reviews and an average rating of 7.0/10. The website's critical consensus reads, "Reveling in the glory of straightforward adventure storytelling, Valhalla is a bloody-good dramatization of Leif Eriksson's conquests." Metacritic gave it a weighted average score of 70 out of 100 based on reviews from 13 critics, indicating "generally favorable reviews". The second season has a 100% approval rating on Rotten Tomatoes based on seven reviews and an average rating of 7.7/10.

=== Accolades ===
The series was nominated for Outstanding Supporting Visual Effects in a Photoreal Episode at the 21st Visual Effects Society Awards.

=== Historical inaccuracies ===
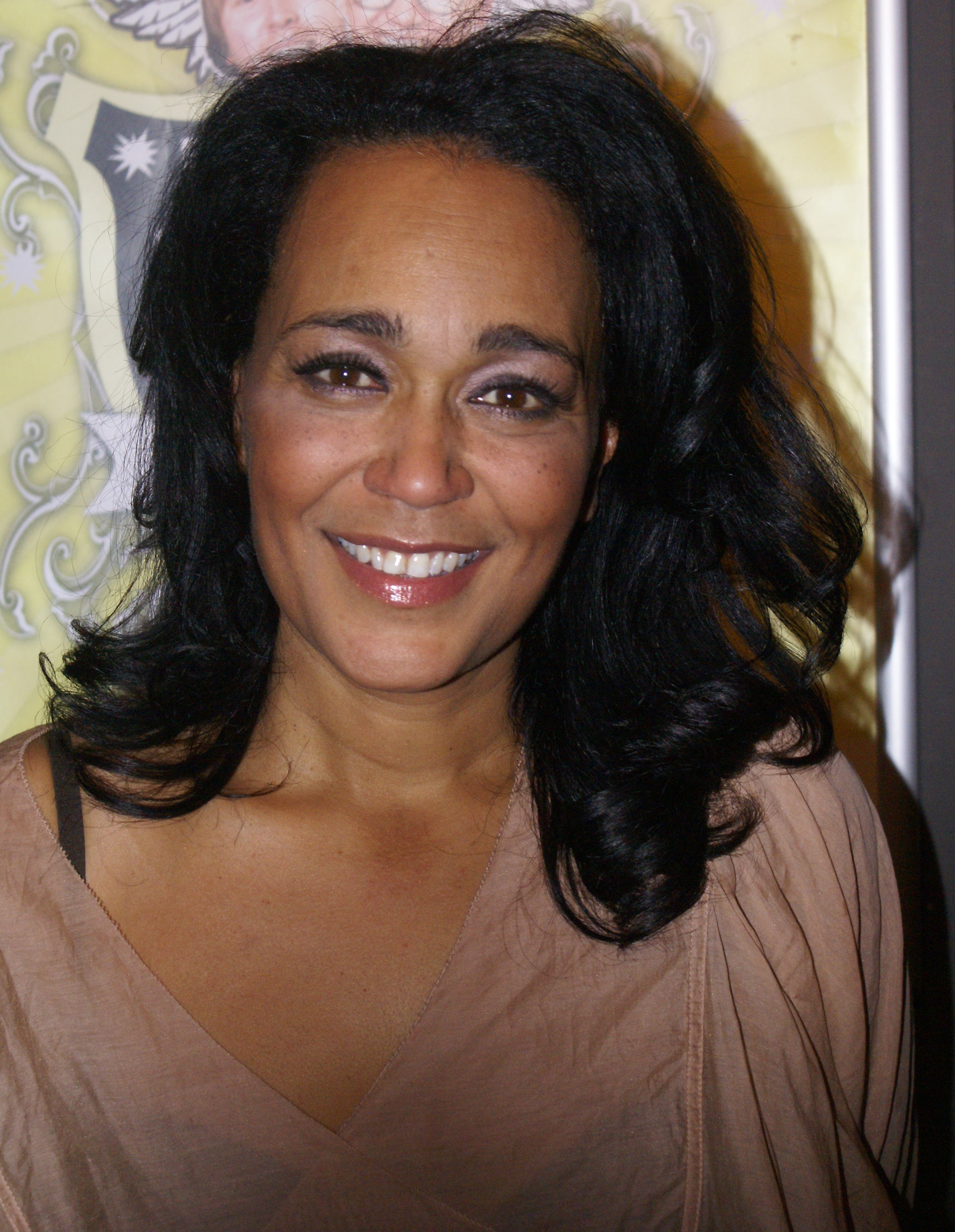
Caroline Henderson portrayed Jarl Estrid Haakon, a fictional character inspired by the historical ruler Haakon Ericsson.

The series depicts the Viking forces uniting under Cnut (Canute in the series) as ruler of the North Sea Empire. While they are at sea, Aethelred II dies of natural causes, with the crown of England then passing to his son Edmund II. Canute later becomes the joint ruler of England alongside Edmund, while Canute's father Swein Forkbeard (Sweyn in the series) only appears in an advisory role. This contrasts with the known history of the time period, where the Vikings were united under Swein and raided England for over a decade. Aethelred was then forced into exile, and Swein took the English throne. The series also depicts a trebuchet being used to defend the city of Kattegat from invasion, although no reference to them being used in Europe is known before 1187.

While other characters in the series are based on historical figures, Jarl Estrid Haakon is an entirely fictional character. Her backstory, featuring a Viking grandfather and a royal African grandmother who met in Alexandria, Egypt before returning to rule in Kattegat, was created specifically for the series.. As in the earlier Vikings series, the predominant Viking town of Kattegat is entirely fictional.

== Video game ==
Vikings: Valhalla, a mobile strategy game developed by Emerald City Games, was released on iOS and Android on September 7, 2023, and requires an active Netflix subscription to play.
