= Ruby Red Trilogy =

German young adult fantasy trilogy

Ruby Red
- First German editions
- Author: Kerstin Gier
- Original title: Rubinrot
- Translator: Anthea Bell
- Language: German
- Series: Ruby Red Trilogy
- Genre: Romance, Science Fiction, Fantasy, Historical Fiction
- Publisher: Arena Verlag (German), Henry Holt and Co.(English translation)
- Publication date: 2009
- Publication place: Germany (location of original publication)
- English publication date: 10 May 2011
- Media type: Print (hardback & paperback)
- Pages: 336
- ISBN: 978-142992121-3
- Followed by: Sapphire Blue

Sapphire Blue
- Author: Kerstin Gier
- Original title: Saphirblau
- Translator: Anthea Bell
- Language: German
- Series: Ruby Red Trilogy
- Genre: Romance, Science Fiction, Fantasy, Historical Fiction
- Publisher: Arena Verlag (German), Henry Holt and Co.(English translation)
- Publication date: 2010
- Publication place: Germany (location of original publication)
- English publication date: 10 May 2011
- Media type: Print (hardback & paperback)
- Pages: 362
- ISBN: 978-125003416-8
- Preceded by: Ruby Red
- Followed by: Emerald Green

Emerald Green
- Author: Kerstin Gier
- Original title: Smaragdgrün
- Translator: Anthea Bell
- Language: German
- Series: Ruby Red Trilogy
- Genre: Romance, Science Fiction, Fantasy, Historical Fiction
- Publisher: Arena Verlag (German), Henry Holt and Co.(English translation)
- Publication date: 2010
- Publication place: Germany (location of original publication)
- English publication date: 8 October 2013
- Media type: Print (hardback & paperback)
- Pages: 464
- ISBN: 978-080509267-7
- Preceded by: Sapphire Blue

The Ruby Red Trilogy is a series of three young adult fantasy novels by German writer Kerstin Gier. The three books are: Ruby Red, Sapphire Blue and Emerald Green. The books have been translated into over twenty-seven languages and sold internationally. The series follows the story of Gwyneth Shepherd, a time-traveling girl living in contemporary London.

== Plot ==
=== Ruby Red ===
Gwyneth Shepherd, a 16-year-old student, feels dizzy for the first time during lunch at her school in London. Not long after, she unintentionally jumps through time while leaving the house. At first, Gwyneth is doubtful about her jump in time, since her cousin Charlotte Montrose has always been destined to have inherited the time travel gene that is passed down through the women in their family. Charlotte had been prepared for that duty her whole life, and resents Gwyneth for messing up her life plans.

Gwyneth experiences two more uncontrolled jumps through time, during the third of which she witnesses herself, or a double of hers, kissing a boy she has never met at a ball in the 1700s. After her third jump, Gwyneth's best friend Lesley convinces her to tell her mother, who had apparently counterfeited Gwyneth's birth documents to protect her from the Guardians. The Lodge is skeptical of the circumstances, but decide to watch Gwen to confirm that she has in fact inherited the time travel gene. Gwyneth travels through time once more and is finally acknowledged as the final time traveler. Gwyneth's blood is fed to the chronograph, the time travel machine that contains secrets of its own, so that she can use it to travel through time smoothly and avoid uncontrolled jumps. Gwyneth is assigned the arrogant and disapproving Gideon de Villiers to watch her.

Gwyneth is scheduled to meet the founder of the lodge, the powerful Count Saint-Germain. Gwyneth travels to meet the Count, hoping she might find some answers. However, Gwyneth is only left with more questions, and is also suspicious of the Count, who is believed to possess telepathy. After the meeting, the stagecoach of their carriage is instructed by someone unknown to take the two to a park, where they are promptly attacked by three men. Gideon and Gwen ward them off, then travel back to their present time.

The next day, Gwyneth is called back to the Lodge, where she is surprised to find that she is needed in order to talk to someone in the past, her great-great-grandmother, and the eighth time traveler, Margaret Tilney, in order for her blood to be read in the chronograph, since Gideon had made two attempts to gather Margaret's blood, but both times, she had refused. The two travel back in time where Margaret is expecting them, despite the exact date that was set in the chronograph to travel back in time being kept secret. Lucy and Paul make their appearance, urging Gwyneth to trust them, and to make sure that all twelve time traveler's blood not be read into the chronograph, for fear that the big event that will happen that may cause more destruction than good. Gideon threatens Lucy with a gun, and makes her escort him and Gwyneth out the house, and as the two are running away, she tells Gwyneth to look up The Green Rider. The two make their escape to a nearby church, inside a confessional booth, where Gideon, unexpectedly, kisses Gwyneth.

=== Sapphire Blue ===
Gideon has just kissed Gwyneth when they are disturbed by a gargoyle demon named Xemerius, whom only Gwyneth can see. Xemerius follows them back to Temple. Gideon and Gwyneth meet with the members of the Inner Circle to discuss how Lucy and Paul knew about their visit to Lady Tilney. All the members, aside from Mr. George and Gideon, suspect that Gwyneth told them.

In order to fulfill her quota of time travel for the day, Gwyneth is sent to the year 1948, where she meets Lord Lucas Montrose, her grandfather.

Lady Arista tells Gwyneth that Charlotte will, from now on, be teaching her how to be a proper time traveler, much to Gwyneth's dismay. Gwyneth is taught dance and quizzed on history, all in preparation for a soiree that Gwyneth must attend on orders of Count Saint-Germain.

Xemerius informs Gwyneth that Gideon was knocked in the head and left unconscious.

After dance and history lessons, she is sent to 1956, where she meets Lucas under the disguise of being his cousin, Hazel, and the two go to a cafe. Lucas tells her that Count Saint-Germain murdered Lancelot de Villiers, the first time traveler, and his ancestor. Lucas tells her that the Count had enemies in the Florentine Alliance, that he had private documents not recorded in the Annals, and that reading all twelve of the time traveler's blood into the chronograph was not the only thing that had to be done in order to reveal its secret.

Gwyneth invites Lesley over, and Mr. Bernard brings Lord Montrose's copy of The Green Rider, which has a series of numbers on a paper; a code that Lesley breaks, but can't make out the meaning of the decoded message. At the soiree, Gideon is led away by Lavinia Rutland, and Gwyneth befriends Lady Brompton and another woman. She meets the Count again and also Lord Alastair, a man who founded the Florentine Alliance.

Raphael figures out that the numbers and letters in the Green Rider form a GPS code. After Gideon is sent away with Lady Lavinia, the Count is delighted to see that Gwen has fallen for Gideon, stating that women in love are much easier to control, and congratulates Gideon for his work. Shocked, angry, and sad, Gwyneth confronts Gideon about it after they elapse to the present again, and he doesn't deny that he planned to make her fall in love with him. Gwyneth leaves angry and heartbroken.

=== Emerald Green ===
Raphael discovers that the coordinates in Lord Montrose's copy of The Green Rider point to Gwyneth‘s house. Xemerius discovers a treasure chest hidden behind the painting of one of Gwyneth‘s ancestors. Mr. Bernard explains he was the one who hid the treasure on behalf of her grandfather and agrees to take it out of its hiding place that evening. Lucas figures out that the treasure is the first chronograph, and Gwyneth realizes that with it, she can travel back in time whenever she wants.

Gideon tries to patch things over, but Gwen still refuses and heads home. Upon opening the chest, they find the first chronograph (with blood from every time-traveller except for Gwyneth and Gideon). Charlotte strongly suspects that the object in the chest (which she saw carried through the house) was the chronograph. She also eavesdrops on Gwyneth, Lesley, Aunt Maddy, Nick, and Mr Bernhard opening the chest and warns Gwyneth about the seriousness of hiding the chronograph from the Lodge. When Gwyneth does not admit to having it, Charlotte alerts the Lodge as to her suspicions, and they come and search Gwyneth's room, where they find the chest and take it with them.

At the ball, Gideon tells the Count that he got Lady Tilney's blood, and he then leads Gwyneth to dance. After running away from Gideon, Gwyneth meets a drunken Rakoczy, who tries to get her to drink something strong, but is thwarted by Gideon. Gwyneth runs away again to an empty room, and Gideon follows her, trying to assure her that he has no feelings for Lady Lavinia. While arguing, Gwyneth discovers her past self staring at them from her third uncontrolled time travel and kisses Gideon as a distraction.

It is revealed that Lord Alcott is the traitor among the Guardians and that Lord Alastair paid a large amount of money to both Alcott and Lavinia to help in his plans. Lady Lavinia is sent away, and Alcott and Alastair fight Gideon and Gwyneth. Gwyneth is sent home, but Gideon shows up during supper and reveals that in order to get the Philosopher's Stone, the secret of the chronograph that will cure mankind's diseases, Gwyneth has to kill herself. Furthermore, she must kill herself specifically because of Gideon.

The next day, when Gwyneth is taken back to elapse, along with her mother, who was also invited, she accidentally overhears the Inner Circle's interrogation of her mother. Gideon has his blood read into the chronograph, and the Philosopher's Stone is revealed.

Gwyneth is poisoned by Rakoczy, and it is revealed that Mr. Whitman is really Count Saint-Germain. Mr. Whitman shoots Gideon, who reveals that he is now immortal, having dissolved the Philosopher's Stone in water and drinking it. He is now able to live forever with Gwyneth.

== Reception ==
The series has gained worldwide popularity after being published in over 27 languages, including German, English, Chinese, Czech, Danish, French, Greek, Hungarian, Hebrew, Italian, Japanese, Korean, Dutch, Polish, Romanian, Spanish, Thai, Turkish, and Norwegian. More than two million books in the series have been sold in Germany alone. In America, Ruby Red won the American Library Association Best Books for Young Adults award.

== Adaptations ==
=== Ruby Red ===
A movie based on the first book, Rubinrot, was released in Germany on 14 March 2013. Maria Ehrich was cast as Gwyneth, Jannis Niewöhner as Gideon, and Laura Berlin as Charlotte. The film was directed by Felix Fuchssteiner, and the screen play was written by Katharina Schöde and author Kerstin Gier. It was mainly shot in Germany but also in a few locations in London. The film was produced by Lieblingsfilm/Munich, mem-film/Berlin, in co-production with Geißendörfer Film and Fernsehproduktion/Cologne, Tele München/Munich. The original version of the movie is in German, but subtitles have been developed in English. Rubinrot was nominated for the International Film Music Critics Award (IFMCA) for Best Original Score for an Action/Adventure/Thriller Film in 2013, but did not win.

=== Sapphire Blue ===
Saphirblau, has been made into a movie as well, released in Germany on 18 December 2014. Many of the actors, actresses, producers, and screenwriters are the same as those of the first movie. The movie was released earlier in Luxembourg and Austria, on 14 and 15 August 2014, respectively. Like Rubinrot, Saphirblau was filmed mainly in Germany. Unlike Rubinrot, Saphirblau deviates significantly from the plot of the novel, as does its sequel, Smaragdgrün.

=== Emerald Green ===
Smaragdgrün was also made into a movie, released 7 July 2016 in Germany.
