= My Fairy Troublemaker =

- Poster
- Directed by: Caroline Origer
- Written by: Silja Clemens
- Produced by: Jean-Marie Musique; Christine Parisse; Maite Woköck; Sebastian Runschke
- Starring: Jella Haase; Lucy Carolan; Tammo Kaulbarsch
- Production companies: Fabrique D’Images; Ella Filmproduktion; SERU Animation
- Release date: 13 October 2022
- Running time: 85 minutes
- Countries: Germany; Luxembourg
- Language: German

My Fairy Troublemaker (Meine Chaosfee & ich) is a 2022 animated fantasy adventure comedy film directed by Caroline Origer. A Luxemburgian-German coproduction, the film revolves around a tooth fairy who remains stuck in the world of humans.

== Plot ==
Maxie, the teenage daughter of a single mother, is not happy to leave the countryside for the big city, but she and her mother move there to form a new family with Amir and his two sons, Sami and Derek.

In the world of fairies, Violetta misses her tooth-fairying exam one more time and she is denied the possibility of going to the world of humans. Despite all interdictions, she manages to go there with her firefly companion Gwen, and the fairy finds herself in Maxi's new room, thinking it is Sami's (who happens to have just lost a tooth).

She spends the night there as she can't go back to the world of fairies. Her presence is soon discovered by Maxie. The latter helps the fairy find another way to go home. Meanwhile, Yolando and the Professor, two fairies, try to access the world of human "the old way", through an old tree whose body leads to the world of humans.

Yolando is called to the world of humans anyway, as Sami has lost another tooth. There he gives Violetta the key to the portal in the tree. That tree happens to be in a warehouse a promoter wants to use to build a hotel. And although he cuts it in two, Violetta has the power to cure it and opens the gate. The Professor tells her that she will never be a tooth fairy, only to let her know she is in fact a powerful flower fairy who can cure plants and nature. Maxie and Violetta part promising to meet every full moon by the tree.

== Voice cast ==
- Jella Haase as Violetta
- Lucy Carolan as Maxie
- Tammo Kaulbarsch as Amir

== Release ==
The film was theatrically released in France as Magic!

== Reception ==
The Guardian gave the film a mixed review, stating: "Luckily, the animation has the finesse the story doesn't; competition for Pixar's rhythm and texture on presumably a fraction of the budget".

A review in Telerama criticized the colors and music in the film but found its plot clever. A similar assessment is found in a Spanish review. La Nación however described it as "a moving tale about the fear in front of changes".
