= Al-ʻIjliyyah =

Syrian scientist, mathematician, and astronomer

Al-ʻIjliyyah bint al-ʻIjliyy (Arabic: العجلية بنت العجلي) was a 10th-century maker of astrolabes active in Aleppo, in what is now northern Syria.

She is sometimes known in modern popular literature as Mariam al-Asṭurlābiyya (Arabic: مريم الأسطرلابية) but her supposed first name 'Mariam' is not mentioned in the only known source about her life.

== Life ==
According to ibn al-Nadim, she was the daughter of another astrolabe maker known as al-ʻIjliyy; she and her father were apprentices (tilmīthah) of an astrolabe maker from Baghdad, Nasṭūlus.

Al-ʻIjliyyah manufactured astrolabes, an astronomical instrument, during the 10th century; she was employed by the first Emir of Aleppo, Sayf al-Dawla, who reigned from 944 to 967.

Beyond that information, nothing is known about her. Her supposed name, "Mariam", is not supported by sources from her time, and the phrase "al-Asturlabiyy" in the names by which she and her father are known simply means "the astrolabist", and indicates their profession; astrolabes were long known by her time.

== Legacy ==
The main-belt asteroid 7060 Al-ʻIjliya, discovered by Henry E. Holt at Palomar Observatory in 1990, was named in her honor. The naming citation was published on 14 November 2016 (M.P.C. 102252).

She inspired a character in the 2015 award-winning book Binti and Netflix series Vikings: Valhalla. She was named an extraordinary woman from the Islamic Golden Age by 1001 Inventions.

== See also ==
- Astronomy in the medieval Islamic world
- List of Muslim astronomers
- List of women astronomers
- Timeline of women in science
