= Maria Ehrich =

German actress (born 1993)

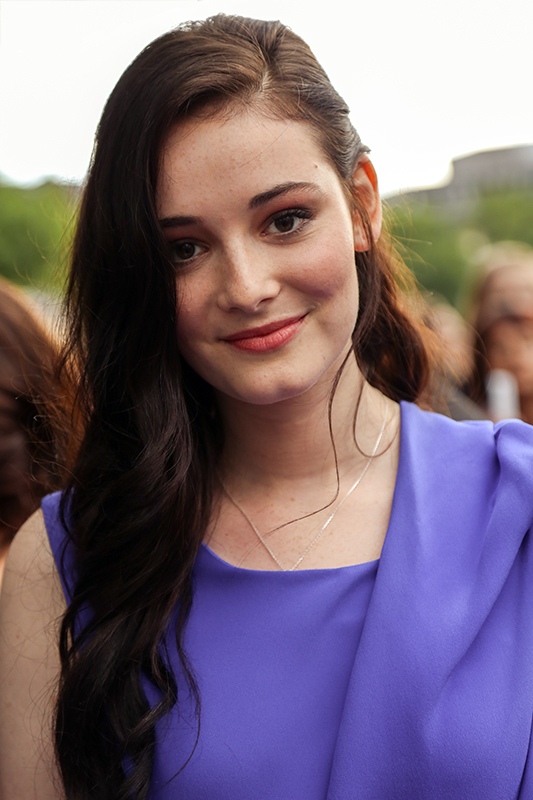
- Ehrich in 2014
- Born: 26 February 1993 (age 33); Erfurt, Thuringia, Germany
- Occupation: Actress
- Years active: 2003–present
- Spouse: Manuel Vering (m. 2021)
- Children: 1

Maria Ehrich (born 26 February 1993) is a German actress. She appeared in more than twenty films since 2013 including her role as Gwendolyn "Gwen" Shepard in the Ruby Red film series based on the book.

== Selected filmography ==
Film
Year	Title	Role	Notes
2021	Prey	Eva	
2016	Emerald Green	Gwendolyn "Gwen" Shepherd	
2015	Twilight Over Burma	Inge Sargent	
2014	Sapphire Blue	Gwendolyn "Gwen" Shepherd	
2013	Ruby Red	Gwendolyn "Gwen" Shepherd	
2004	My Brother Is a Dog	Marietta	

TV
Year	Title	Role	Notes
2013	Hotel Adlon: A Family Saga	Young Alma Schadt	
2011	Doctor's Diary	Peggy	

== Awards ==
- 2015: Goldene Kamera newcomer award
