= Prey (2021 film) =

- Directed by: Thomas Sieben
- Written by: Sonja Ewers; Thomas Sieben
- Produced by: Sonja Ewers; Barbara Mientus
- Starring: David Kross; Hanno Koffler; Maria Ehrich; Robert Finster; Yung Ngo; Klaus Steinbacher; Livia Matthes; Nellie Thalbach
- Cinematography: Andreas Berger
- Edited by: Robert Rzesacz
- Music by: Michael Kamm; Maximilian Stephan
- Production company: Senator Film Produktion
- Distributed by: Netflix
- Release date: 10 September 2021
- Running time: 87 minutes
- Country: Germany
- Language: German

Prey is a 2021 German film directed by Thomas Sieben and written by Sonja Ewers and Thomas Sieben and starring David Kross, Hanno Koffler and Maria Ehrich. It was released by Netflix on September 10, 2021.

== Plot ==
A group of friends go canoeing and then halt for a campfire. Suddenly, they hear a gunshot and wonder if hunting season has started. Albert sees a unicorn toy while hiking and pockets it.

They hear another gunshot and it sounds closer and they see that Vincent is hit and bleeding. They bandage his hand using a first aid kit, but more gunshots flatten their car tire and break the windows. They believe there's a sharpshooter hunting them, and decide to take cover inside the forest among the trees, before deciding to head in the direction of a nearby road.

Albert gets his foot stuck inside a hole, and his ankle is sprained, disabling him a bit. Wandering, the group sees a lady by the lake (Eva) and call out to her for help, but she takes a rifle and kills Stefan. They realize that she is the sharpshooter and flee the area. Running around, they come across an Information Center in the middle of the forest and request the lady at the desk to make an emergency phone call. While calling the emergency line, the lady at the desk is shot dead, as is Vincent. Eva is seen outside the window as the group leaves the place with only three survivors remaining - Peter, and brothers Roman & Albert.

As they walk to the road, Eva sees and points her gun at them, but lets them walk away without shooting at them. They arrive at a few abandoned forest homes with children's playgrounds. Roman goes to an abandoned home and sees a laptop with a video showing the shooting of Eva's baby. He learns that Eva was a mother whose baby was once shot by accident and is now insane, shooting at unarmed men.

Peter asks Albert to talk about Lisa, his brother Roman's girlfriend, and then leaves them. Walking on the road, Peter is shot in the leg and falls to the ground. Eva arrives at the scene and shoots Peter dead, even as he begs for his life. She then shoots and wounds Albert, but doesn't follow him, watching Roman assisting his brother away from her vicinity.

Roman unlocks Albert's phone with his fingerprint and sees naked photos of Lisa on the bed. Roman recalls his brother visiting him and being alone with his girlfriend Lisa. Albert wakes up and apologizes, but Roman slaps him and moves him into a cave. Roman takes the unicorn toy from his brother and enters the dark cave containing several other dead men shot by Eva. Climbing a ladder, he sees the shooter and sneaks up behind her. She hears him and turns around to shoot him in the foot. He shows her the unicorn toy, and when she reaches for it, he grapples with her, grabs the gun and throws it away. After being disarmed, Eva commits suicide by dropping down a cliff. Roman sits down and heaves a sigh of relief.

== Cast ==
- David Kross as Roman
- Hanno Koffler as Albert
- Maria Ehrich as Eva
- Robert Finster as Peter
- Yung Ngo as Vincent
- Klaus Steinbacher as Stefan
- Livia Matthes as Lisa
- Nellie Thalbach as Jenny
