= Combat Girls =

- Promotional poster
- Directed by: David Wnendt
- Written by: David Wnendt
- Produced by: Eva-Marie Martens
- Starring: Alina Levshin; Jella Haase
- Cinematography: Jonas Schmager
- Edited by: Andreas Wodraschke
- Music by: Johannes Repka
- Distributed by: Ascot Elite; EastWest Distribution
- Release dates: 28 June 2011 (Munich Film Festival); 19 January 2012 (Germany)
- Running time: 103 minutes
- Country: Germany
- Language: German

Combat Girls (the original title is Kriegerin, the German term for a female warrior) is a 2011 German drama film written and directed by David Wnendt. It had its international premiere at the 2011 São Paulo International Film Festival where Alina Levshin was awarded as best actress. It won the best screenplay and best female lead categories and came third in the best film category at the German Film Awards (Deutscher Filmpreis) in 2012.

== Plot ==
The movie opens showing Marisa (Alina Levshin) dying on a cold shore somewhere in Northern Germany in the presence of her friend Svenja (Jella Haase). The film develops the story which led to the shore scene and follows the journey of the two girls as they move into and partly also out of a neonazi group.

As a little girl Marisa is taught by her grandfather (Klaus Manchen) how to carry a heavy backpack filled with sand. Only when she meets his expectations he gives his "combat girl" a loving hug. At that point it is unknown to her that her beloved grandfather used to harass and beat Marisa's mother for being pregnant.

Twenty-year-old Marisa still lives in the same town and cherishes her grandpa. She visits him regularly in hospital where he lies ill, dying some time later. Yet on weekends she meets with her gang of violent Nazis, xenophobic working class kids. She and her boyfriend Sandro (Gerdy Zint) violently attack and beat down foreign-looking passengers on a train and even attack a conductor. Soon thereafter police raid her house while she is watering her grandpa's flowers. Both she and Sandro are arrested and Sandro is sent to prison.

Meanwhile it is shown that Svenja's stepfather is incredibly strict with her, against which she eventually rebels. She meets 20-year-old Markus (Lukas Steltner) who works for her family in their garden and they start hanging out. He turns out to be friends with Marisa and is a Neo-Nazi like Marisa. 15-year-old Svenja is very intrigued by the violent, partying, in-the-moment life-style these young Nazis have and becomes more and more involved.

Sandro is eventually about to be released from prison and Marisa's mother (Rosa Enskat) cannot stand the thought of Sandro moving in with her daughter while Marisa even wants to have a child with him. Mother and daughter have a sharp dispute over the issue in the local grocery shop where both of them work. After her fight with her mother two young refugee brothers from Afghanistan (Sayed Ahmad Wasil Mrowat as Rasul and Najebullah "Najeb" Ahmadi as Jamil) become the target of her bad mood.

Later Marisa and her gang enjoy themselves at the shore. They consume a lot of alcohol and chant aggressive slogans about Marisa's two former customers who arrive on the scene to take a swim. Rasul and Jamil are chased off. The appalled Rasul breaks the side mirror of Marisa's car as they leave. Marisa later finds her mirror broken off and chases the two who are heading "home" on Jamil's scooter. She uses her car as a weapon pushing them off the road at high speed. Then she flees the scene. Back with her friends she attempts to drown her qualms in alcohol. At this point Svenja and her new friend have also shown up at the beach but are chased away by a furious Marisa.

Some time later Marisa sees Rasul again at her workplace and he is short of money. She still lets him do his shopping. Meanwhile Rasul's situation has gotten worse. As a result of the accident Jamil's papers have been checked officially in hospital and he got deported. Rasul is supposed to live in an orphanage. He eludes his custodians and is caught red-handed while shoplifting by Marisa's mom. Marisa gets violent against her own mother just to free Rasul before she follows him to his hiding place where he offers her a drink and helps her bandage a foot injury.

Sandro is released from prison and Marisa picks him up and complies with his wish to visit a Neo-Nazi party where Sandro buys the pistol of an old Austrian Nazi. He frightens off Markus, beating him down and kicking him out of the gang. Little later Markus blindsides Sandro with some accomplices and they heavily beat down Sandro. He attempts to restore his self-confidence by forcing himself on Marisa. Afterwards he also threatens a number of immigrants with his pistol and beats up Rasul when he sees him in front of Marisa's house.

Marisa decides to help Rasul to get to Sweden where his uncle lives. She tells her friend Svenja to come with them because Svenja recently ran away from home with a large sum of money stolen from her stepfather. She takes revenge for Rasul and herself by beating up Sandro with a baseball bat who opposed her plan to get away from him. But Sandro catches up as they reach Rügen where a boat will leave to Sweden because Svenja has called him and asked him to pick her up revealing their position to him. He arrives on the scene and fires a single shot from the pistol he bought, shooting Marisa dead minutes after Rasul left on a boat.

== Cast ==
- Alina Levshin: Marisa
- Jella Haase: Svenja
- Sayed Ahmad Wasil Mrowat: Rasul
- Gerdy Zint: Sandro
- Lukas Steltner: Markus
- Uwe Preuss: Oliver, Svenja's step-father
- Winnie Böwe: Andrea, Svenja's mother
- Rosa Enskat: Bea, Marisa's mother
- Haymon Maria Buttinger: Clemens, the Austrian
- Klaus Manchen: Grandpa (Franz)

== Reception ==
On the review aggregator website Rotten Tomatoes, the film has an approval rating of 68% based on reviews from 14 critics, with an average rating of 6.7 out of 10, with audience reviews saying "A rambling, but fairly powerful character study that draws a vivid portrait of this violent lifestyle", and "Even though many films have brilliantly shown the topic of neo-Nazism and its rise in contemporary society, (the film) focuses on the role of women in this environment."

== See also ==
- American History X
- This is England
