= 4 Kings (2015 film) =

2015 film

- Directed by: Theresa von Eltz
- Starring: Paula Beer; Jella Haase; Jannis Niewöhner; Moritz Leu
- Release date: 4 October 2015 (FFH)
- Running time: 98 minutes
- Country: Germany
- Language: German

4 Kings (German: 4 Könige) is a 2015 German drama film directed by Theresa von Eltz.

== Cast ==
- Paula Beer - Alex
- Jella Haase - Lara
- Jannis Niewöhner - Timo
- Moritz Leu - Fedja
- Clemens Schick - Dr. Wolff
- Anneke Kim Sarnau - Schwester Simone
