= Alpha 0.7 – Der Feind in dir =

- Also known as: Alpha 0.7 – The Enemy Within You
- Country of origin: Germany

Original release
- Release: 14 November 2010

Alpha 0.7 – Der Feind in dir (German: Alpha 0.7 – The Enemy Within You) is a German transmedia science fiction series which first aired on 14 November 2010 on SWR TV. It is set in Stuttgart in 2017 where surveillance is omnipresent. It stars Victoria Mayer, Anna Maria Mühe, Arne Lenk, Tobias Schenke, Oliver Stritzel, Thomas Huber and Rolf Kanies.

== See also ==
- List of German television series
