= Alina Levshin =

Ukrainian/German actress

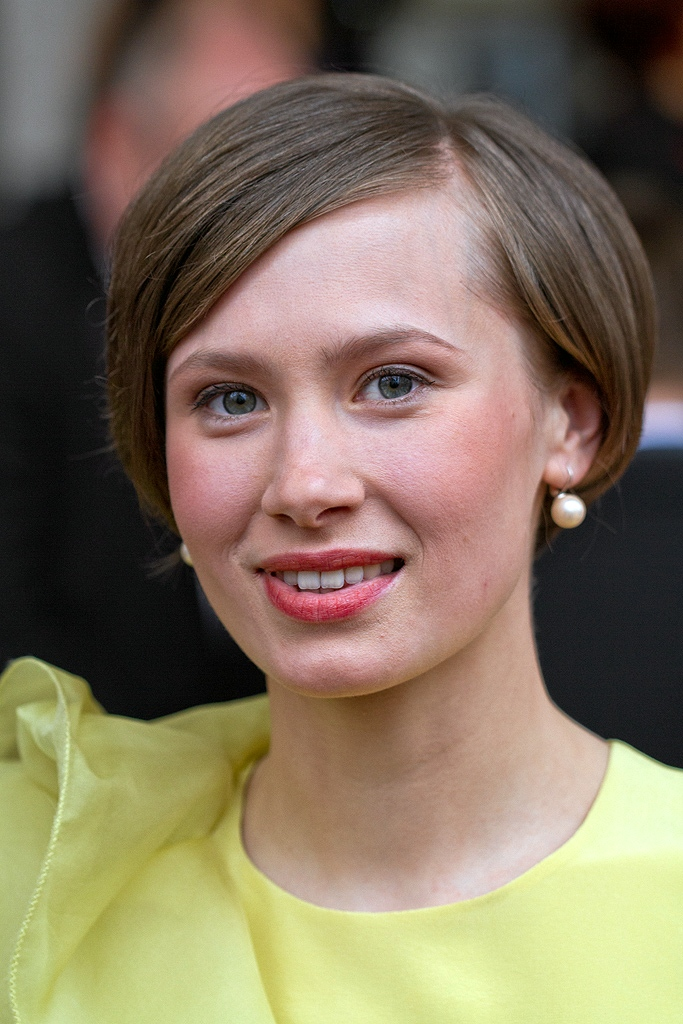
- Levshin at the German Film Awards in 2012
- Born: September 10, 1984 (age 41); Odesa, Ukrainian SSR, Soviet Union
- Occupation: Actress

Alina Levshin (born September 10, 1984) is a German-Ukrainian actress. She moved with her parents from the Soviet Union to Germany when she was six. From 2006 to 2010, she studied acting at the College of Film and Television "Konrad Wolf" in Potsdam.

Levshin was one of the main cast members in Dominik Graf’s television series Im Angesicht des Verbrechens who collectively received the German Television Award in 2010. She starred in the 2011 German film Combat Girls (Kriegerin), for which she won the best actress awards at the Deutscher Filmpreis awards and the São Paulo International Film Festival.

She appeared in Generation War (German: Unsere Mütter, unsere Väter, lit. 'Our mothers, our fathers'), a German World War II TV miniseries in 2013 as well as in Dunkelstadt, a TV series of ZDF.
