= Josefine Preuß =

German actress

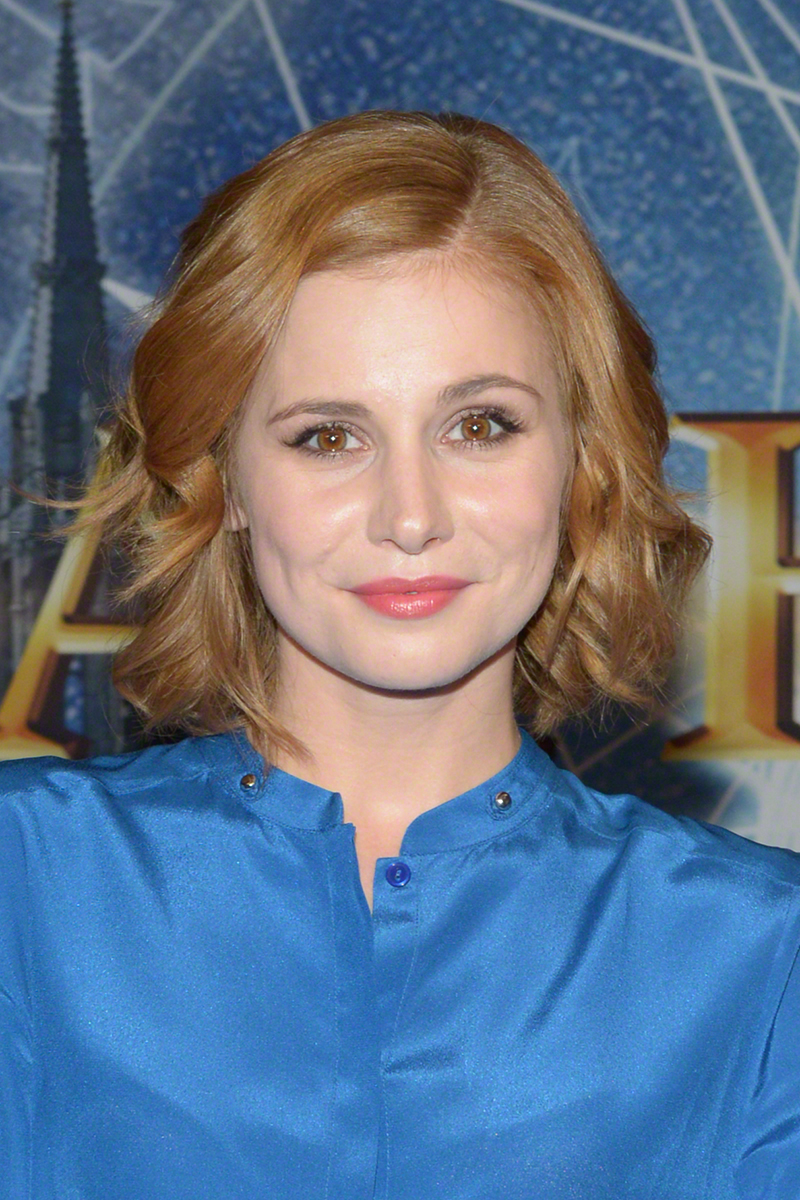
- Born: 13 January 1986 (age 39); Zehdenick, Bezirk Potsdam, East Germany
- Occupation: Actress
- Years active: 2000–present

Josefine Preuß (born 13 January 1986) is a German television actress.

== Early life ==
Preuß was born in Zehdenick, Brandenburg, near Berlin with an older sister. She won the Brandenburg Junior Championships in rhythmic gymnastics in 1993.

== Career ==
Her breakthrough role was Anna Reichenbach in Schloss Einstein (Einstein Castle), a broadcast for children, in which she starred from 1999 to 2001. Preuß also starred in numerous other movies and broadcasts like Abschnitt 40 or The School Trip. She won the German TV Award for Best Supporting Actress in 2005. Since 2005, she has been playing Lena, the lead role in the family comedy Türkisch für Anfänger (Turkish for Beginners). As "Josi" she hosts Quergelesen, a TV show for children about books. As a voice actor, she performed the German voices for Mary Katherine in the 2013 film Epic and as Judy Hopps in the 2016 film Zootropolis.

== Selected filmography ==
Year	Title	Role	Notes
2004	Jargo	Emilia	
2006–2009	Türkisch für Anfänger	Lena	TV series
2007	Küss mich, Genosse!	Alexandra Lütjens	TV film
2012	Turkish for Beginners	Lena	Feature film
2013	Hotel Adlon: A Family Saga	Sonja Schadt	TV miniseries
2013	Ruby Red	Lucy Montrose	
2013	Epic	Mary Katherine	voice; German version
2013	Lost Place	Jessica	
2014	The Midwife	Gesa Langwasser	TV film
2014	Therapy Crashers	Mia	
2014	Sapphire Blue	Lucy Montrose	
2016	Zootopia	Judy Hopps	voice; German version
2016	Emerald Green	Lucy Montrose	
2016	Das Sacher	Konstanze von Traunstein	TV movie
2017	Lotta & der Ernst des Lebens		TV movie
2018	Schattengrund – Ein Harz-Thriller		TV movie
2019	Lotta & der schöne Schein		TV movie
2019	Lotta & der Mittelpunkt der Welt		TV movie
