= Kerstin Gier =

German author

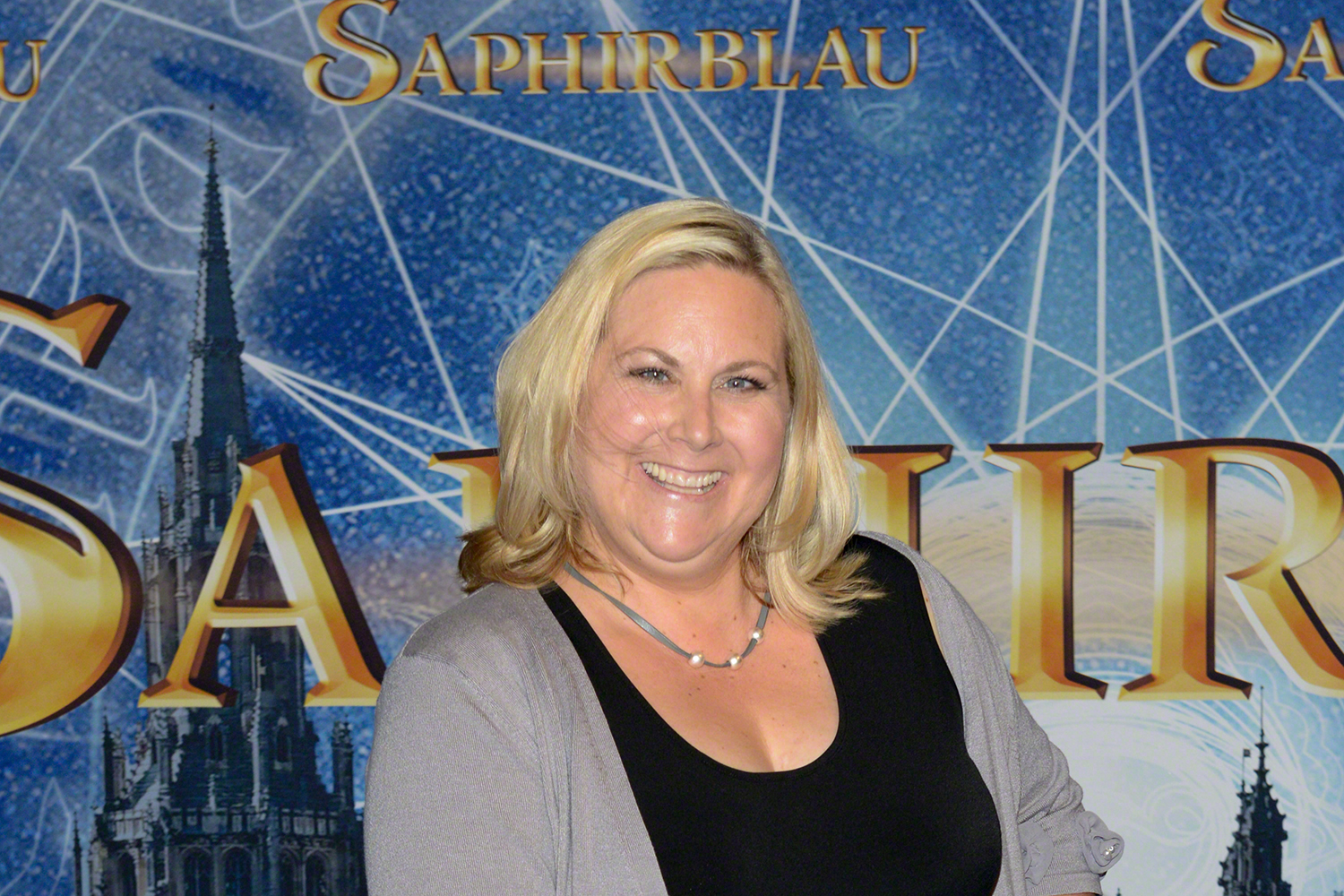
- Gier in 2014
- Born: 8 October 1968 (age 57)
- Occupation: novelist
- Writing career
- Pen name: Jule Brand Sophie Bérard
- Notable work: Ruby Red Trilogy

Kerstin Gier (born 8 October 1966) is a German author of novels for adults and young adults. Her young adult novel Rubinrot (Ruby Red) and its two sequels, as well as her Silber trilogy were translated into English by Anthea Bell.

== Personal life ==
She lives in Kürten with her husband Frank. She has a son, Lennart.

== Bibliography ==
=== Young adult books ===
==== Gem Trilogy ====
- Rubinrot, 2009 (Published in the United States as Ruby Red, Henry Holt and Co., 2011)
- Saphirblau, 2010 (Published in the United States as Sapphire Blue, Henry Holt and Co., 2012)
- Smaragdgrün, 2012 (Published in the United States as Emerald Green, Henry Holt and Co., 2013)
- Liebe geht durch alle Zeiten, 2012 (Published in the United States as The Ruby Red Trilogy Boxed Set, Square Fish, 2014)

==== Silver: The Book Of Dreams Trilogy ====
- Silber. Das erste Buch der Träume, 2013 (Published in the United States as Dream A Little Dream, Henry Holt and Co., 2015)
- Silber. Das zweite Buch der Träume, 2014 (Published in the United States as Dream On, Henry Holt and Co., 2016)
- Silber. Das dritte Buch der Träume, 2015 (Published in the United States as Just Dreaming, Henry Holt and Co., 2017)

==== Other ====
- Jungs sind wie Kaugummi, 2009
- Das Wolkenschloss, 2017 (Published in the United States as A Castle in the Clouds, Henry Holt and Co., 2020)
- Was man bei Licht nicht sehen kann, 2021

=== Adult books ===
- Männer und andere Katastrophen, 1996
- Die Laufmasche, 1997
- Die Braut sagt leider nein, 1998
- Fisherman's Friend in meiner Koje, 1998
- Die Mütter-Mafia, 2005
- Die Patin, 2006
- Ach, wär ich nur zu Hause geblieben, 2007
- Ehebrecher und andere Unschuldslämmer, 2007
- Für jede Lösung ein Problem, 2007
- Lügen, die von Herzen kommen, 2007
- Ein unmoralisches Sonderangebot, 2008
- Gegensätze ziehen sich aus, 2009
- In Wahrheit wird viel mehr gelogen, 2009
- Auf der anderen Seite ist das Gras viel grüner, 2011
- Die Mütter-Mafia und Friends, 2011
