= Nils Dörgeloh =

German actor (born 1979)

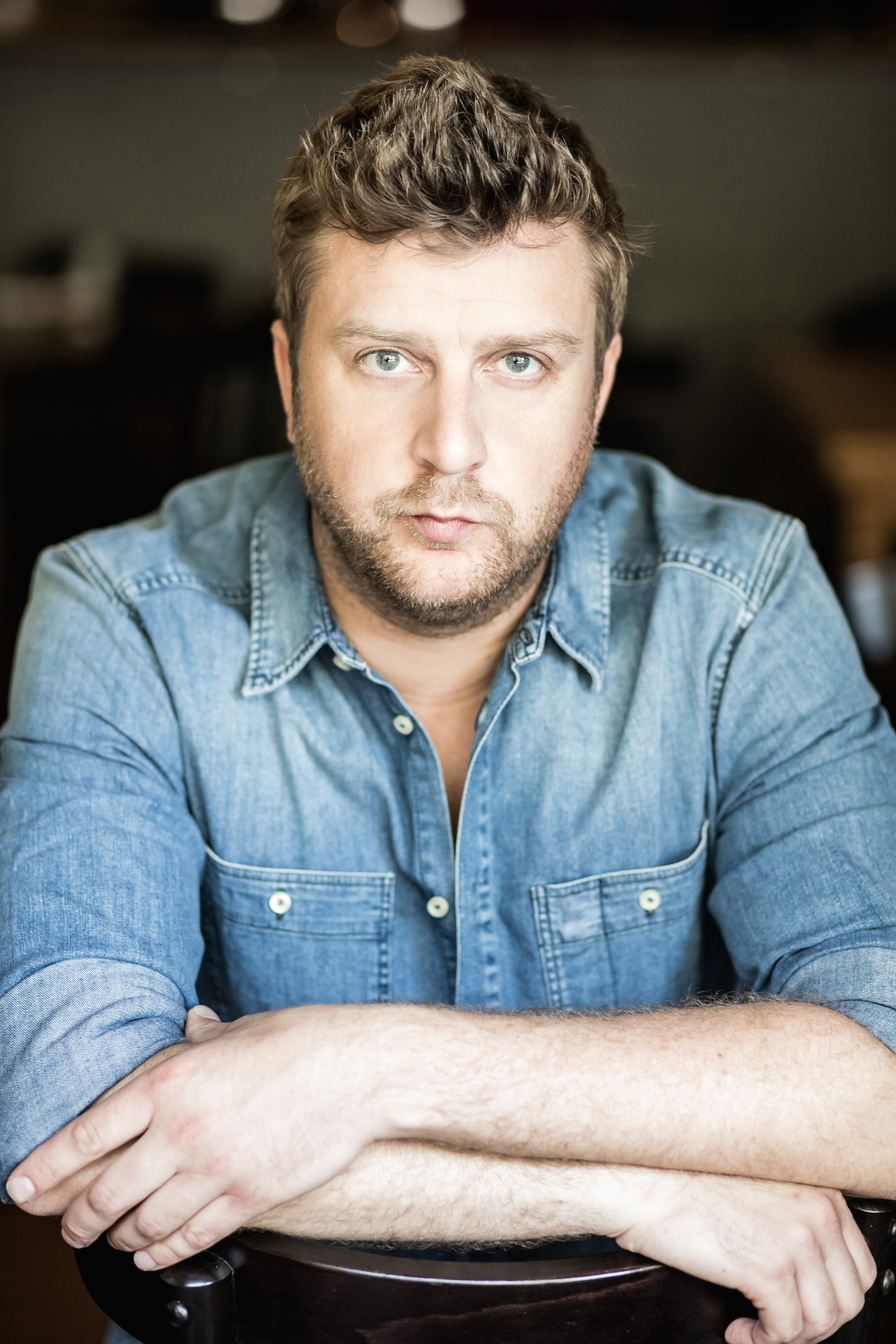
- Nils Dörgeloh Nils Dörgeloh (2016)
- Born: Nils Dörgeloh; 25 December 1979 (age 46); Delmenhorst, West Germany
- Occupation: Actor
- Years active: 2012-present

Nils Dörgeloh (born 25 December 1979) is a German actor.

== Life ==
Nils Dörgeloh has trained at the Schule für Schauspiel Hamburg and at the William Esper Studio in New York City. He later studied at the Michael Chekhov Acting Studio in Berlin. He also took acting lessons in Los Angeles.

In 2013, Nils Dörgeloh made his movie debut in Marco Kreuzpaintner’s comedy Coming In, alongside Kostja Ullmann and Aylin Tezel. His first big screen appearance was in Beck's Last Summer with Christian Ulmen debuted in German cinemas in 2015.

Since 2017 Nils Dörgeloh is a series regular in the comedy series Jerks alongside Christian Ulmen and Fahri Yardim.

He received the Quotenmeter Fernsehpreis as Best supporting actor for his portrayal of Jacob. Since January 2017 the series can be streamed on maxdome. In February 2017 it was broadcast on ProSieben.

Currently Nils Dörgeloh is involved in the SWR series Labaule und Erben, which will be shot until mid-December 2017. The story is based on an idea by Harald Schmidt and the script is written by Richard Kropf, Bob Konrad and Hanno Hackford, the authors of 4 Blocks. Nils Dörgeloh is working on the project together with actor Uwe Ochsenknecht and director Boris Kunz (Hindafing).

In October 2017 Nils Dörgeloh shot his second episode of the popular German crime series Tatort in Bremen. In the episode “Im toten Winkel” by director Philip Koch he will be seen in a main role. Furthermore he completed filming the ARD comedy Opa wird Papa, Der Mordanschlag, a TV movie in two parts by director Miguel Alexandre, and one episode of the RTL comedy series Jenny - echt gerecht. The Tatort episode Die dunkle Zeit (director: Niki Stein), on which Nils Dörgeloh worked together with Wotan Wilke Möhring premiered at Filmfest Hamburg 2017. The TV movie will air on 17 December 2017 on ARD. In 2018, Dörgeloh played a leading role in the new television series Milk & Honey.

== Filmography ==
- 2013: Coming In (Cinema)
- 2014: SOKO Wismar – Tödliche Nebenwirkungen
- 2014: 600 PS für zwei (TV movie)
- 2015: Kommissar Marthaler – Ein allzu schönes Mädchen (TV movie)
- 2015: Beck's Last Summer (Cinema)
- 2015: Big Fish, Small Fish (TV movie)
- Since 2017: Jerks (TV series)
- 2017: Tatort – Die dunkle Zeit (TV movie)
- 2017: Die Kanzlei – Absturz
- 2017: Familie Dr. Kleist – Freunde oder mehr
- 2017: Notruf Hafenkante – Entführt
- 2017: Tatort – Im toten Winkel (TV movie)
- 2017: Opa wird Papa (TV movie)
- 2017: SOKO Hamburg – Junggesellenabschied
- 2017: Jenny – echt gerecht – Fahrerflucht
- 2017: Ihr seid natürlich eingeladen (TV movie)
- 2017: Der Mordanschlag (TV movie)
- 2018: Milk & Honey (TV series, 10 episodes)
- 2018: Labaule & Erben (Miniseries, 6 episodes)
- 2019: Camping mit Herz (TV movie)
- 2020: The Kangaroo Chronicles (Cinema)
- 2021: Next Door (Cinema)
