= Hanno Koffler =

German actor, musician (born 1980)

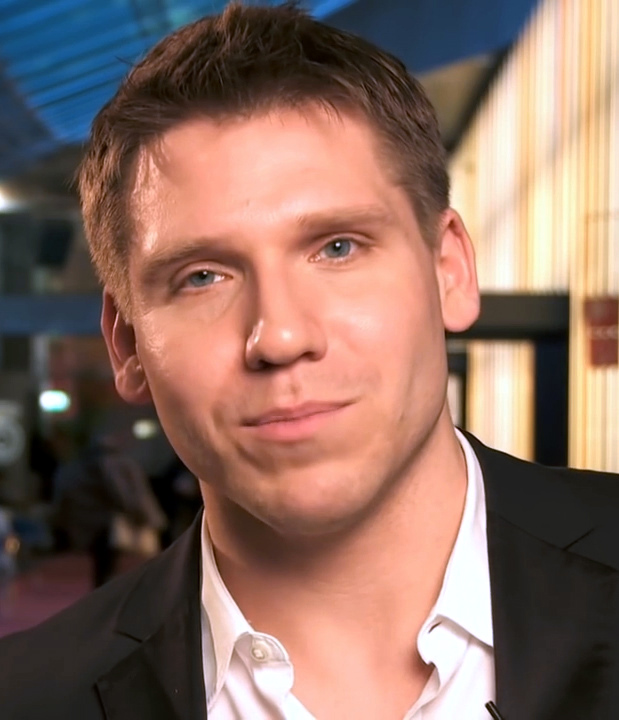
- Koffler in 2015
- Born: March 25, 1980 (age 46); West Berlin, West Germany
- Occupations: Actor; musician
- Years active: 2000–present

Hanno Koffler (born March 25, 1980) is a German actor and musician. His most famous films include Summer Storm, Krabat and Free Fall. He also starred in the Oscar-nominated film, Never Look Away (2018), directed by Florian Henckel von Donnersmarck.

== Life and career ==
Koffler was born in West Berlin, Federal Republic of Germany. He was raised with his three brothers in Charlottenburg by a working middle-class family. With the fall of the Berlin Wall, the Koffler family was severely affected, as Hanno's father fell professionally, forcing the family to move to Saxony-Anhalt. At an early age, Koffler began acting in small roles in plays.

In 1994 he founded the band "Kerosin" with his brother Max Koffler, Hanno being the drummer. The band ranked second in the world's largest live band contest "Emergenza" in 2002.

Upon returning to Berlin at the age of 18, Koffler applied for admission to the Ernst Busch Theater School, but was rejected. In 2002, he would officially begin his acting career with various roles in cinema films such as Anatomy 2 and in Marco Kreuzpaintner films, including the 2004 Summer Storm and Krabat in 2008. He later moved to Austria. to study acting until 2007 at the Max Reinhardt Seminar in Vienna, where he would play roles in various theatrical productions directed by Klaus Maria Brandauer.

After several performances in television, theater, and cinema, in 2013 he starred in the film Free Fall, along with Max Riemelt and Katharina Schüttler. The film was directed by Stephan Lacant and became a huge success both in Germany and internationally.

In 2015, he was nominated for a Best Actor for the Deutscher Filmpreis for the drama/documentary film Tough Love (Härte), by director Rosa von Praunheim, in which he plays Andreas Marquardt. It was screened in the Panorama section of the 65th Berlin International Film Festival where it won third place in the Panorama Audience Award.

In 2016, he appeared in the Rivals Forever: The Sneaker Battle miniseries, playing Rudolf Dassler.

In 2018, he starred in Florian Henckel von Donnersmarck's Oscar-nominated film Never Look Away with Tom Schilling, Sebastian Koch, Paula Beer, and Saskia Rosendahl.

In 2019, he joined the original Amazon Beat series, again under the direction of Marco Kreuzpaintner, playing the character of Paul. That same year, he was part of the cast of the first season of German series, Pagan Peak.

He assumed the recurring role of Walter Stennes in Babylon Berlin's third and fourth seasons.

== Awards ==
- Filmfestival Durban, South Africa (2008) - Best male Actor for A Hero's Welcome (Nacht vor Augen)
- Franz-Hofer-Preis, Filmhaus Saarbrücken (2009) for A Hero's Welcome (Nacht vor Augen)
- 2014 - German Film Award - Nominated Film Award in Gold Best Performance by an Actor in a Leading Role - Freier Fall (film)

== Filmography ==
- 2002: Die Dickköpfe (TV)
- 2003: Ganz und gar
- 2003: Anatomy 2
- 2004: Summer Storm
- 2004: Hallesche Kometen
- 2004: Charlotte und ihre Männer (TV)
- 2005: Rabenbrüder
- 2008: The Red Baron
- 2008: Krabat
- 2008: A Hero's Welcome
- 2009: Tatort – Im Sog des Bösen (TV)
- 2009: Live Wire
- 2010: The Frontier (TV)
- 2010: Keiner geht verloren (TV)
- 2011: If Not Us, Who?
- 2012: Foreign Deployment
- 2013: Free Fall
- 2014: Coming In
- 2014: Besondere Schwere der Schuld (TV)
- 2015: Tough Love
- 2015: Master of Death (TV)
- 2016: Rivals Forever: The Sneaker Battle (TV)
- 2017: Boarding-School Intrigue (TV)
- 2018: Beat (TV)
- 2018: Never Look Away
- 2019: Pagan Peak (TV)
- 2021: Prey
