= Boris Kunz =

Boris Kunz (born 1979 in Weiden in der Oberpfalz) is a German film director and screenwriter.

== Career ==
Kunz grew up near Lake Chiemsee and trained as a director at the University of Television and Film Munich. His graduation film, Drei Stunden, starring Nicholas Reinke and Claudia Eisinger—premiered at the 2012 Hof International Film Festival. That same year, the film was also screened at the Biberach Film Festival and was released in German cinemas in the summer of 2013. He directed the TV miniseries Labaule & Erben for SWR, based on an idea by Harald Schmidt and starring Uwe Ochsenknecht, with two episodes premiering at the Munich Film Festival on July 5, 2018. Further film and television projects followed, including 2023 Netflix science fiction action thriller Paradise, filmed in Lithuania, starring Iris Berben and Kostja Ullmann.

== Filmography ==
2007: Wie es bleibt (How It Remains) (Director) 2008: Tage wie Jahre (Days Like Years) (Director) 2010: Daniels Asche (Director and scriptwriter) 2010: Transit (Assistant director) 2011: Trans Bavaria (Assistant director) 2012: Drei Stunden (Three Hours) (Director and scriptwriter) 2017: Hindafing (Upwards Place), TV series (Director and scriptwriter) 2018: Labaule & Erben (Director) 2019: Hindafing (Upwards Place), TV series (Director and scriptwriter) 2020: Breaking Even, TV series (Director and scriptwriter) 2021: Tatort: Dreams (Director) 2023: Paradise (Director)
