= Coming In =

- Theatrical release poster
- Directed by: Marco Kreuzpaintner
- Screenplay by: Marco Kreuzpaintner; Jane Ainscough
- Story by: Marco Kreuzpaintner; Jane Ainscough; Christoph Müller
- Produced by: Gabriela Bacher; Christoph Müller; Christian Angermayer
- Starring: Kostja Ullmann; Aylin Tezel; Ken Duken; Katja Riemann
- Cinematography: Daniel Gottschalk
- Edited by: Hansjörg Weißbrich; Dunja Campregher
- Music by: Peter Plate; Ulf Leo Sommer; Daniel Faust
- Production companies: Summerstorm Entertainment; Warner Bros. Film Productions Germany; Bavaria Film Partners
- Distributed by: Warner Bros. Pictures
- Release date: 24 October 2014 (Germany)
- Running time: 104 minutes
- Country: Germany
- Language: German

Coming In is a 2014 German romantic comedy film directed by Marco Kreuzpaintner.

== Plot ==
Tom Herzner, a notoriously hip hairdresser, falls in love with a beauty parlor owner named Heidi. The only problem is that Tom is gay and has never had sex with a woman before. Tom is in a relationship with his business partner and boyfriend Robert, but finds himself falling for Heidi and facing the disapproval of his gay friends and community.

Filmmaker Marco Kreuzpaintner has said that he wanted to give a fresh twist on the genre of romantic comedy, stating how he "loved the idea of a totally politically incorrect story: a gay guy falling in love with a girl, and how this challenges his own and his friends' point of view."

== Cast ==
- Kostja Ullmann as Tom Herzner
- Aylin Tezel as Heidi
- Ken Duken as Robert
- Katja Riemann as Berta
- August Zirner as Salvatore
- Denis Moschitto as Bassam
- Tilo Prückner as Erich
- Paula Riemann as Maja
- Frederick Lau as Didi
- Bruno Eyron as Sam
- Mavie Hörbiger as Mona
- Hanno Koffler as Adrian
- Eugen Bauder as Joao
- Max Felder as Julian
- André Jung as Harry
- Nils Dörgeloh as Tybalt
