= Schuld nach Ferdinand von Schirach =

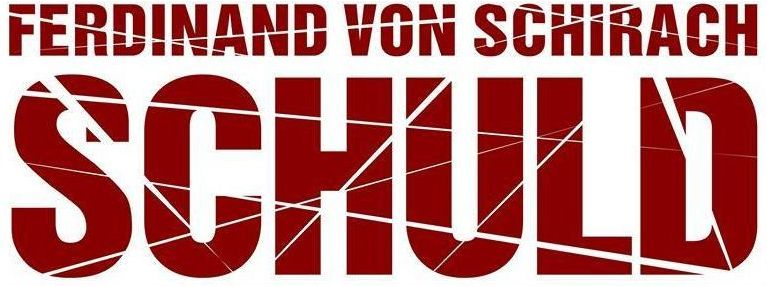
- Genre: Crime
- Based on: Schuld by Ferdinand von Schirach
- Written by: André Georgi; Jobst Oetzmann; Nina Grosse; Jan Ehlert
- Directed by: Maris Pfeiffer; Hannu Salonen
- Starring: Moritz Bleibtreu
- Opening theme: "Schlaflos" by Jennifer Rostock
- Composers: Marco Meister; Robert Meister
- Country of origin: Germany
- Original language: German
- No. of seasons: 1
- No. of episodes: 6

Production
- Executive producer: Jan Ehlert
- Producer: Oliver Berben
- Production location: Berlin
- Cinematography: Hanno Lentz
- Editor: Günther van Endert
- Running time: 45 Minutes
- Production company: Moovie – the art of entertainment

Original release
- Network: ZDF
- Release: 20 February – 27 March 2015

Shades of Guilt (German: Schuld nach Ferdinand von Schirach) is a German television series. It was first broadcast on 6 February 2015, on the internet. The television release was on 20 February 2015, on German television channel ZDF. It based on the novel Schuld written by Ferdinand von Schirach. Moritz Bleibtreu plays the main role of the defense lawyer Friedrich Kronberg.

== Plot ==
The lawyer and criminal defense attorney Friedrich Kronberg meets in his cases not only interesting characters from real life, but he is often confronted with moral issues.

== Cast ==
Main cast

- Moritz Bleibtreu as Friedrich Kronberg

Guest cast

- The other cast varies in every episode and can be seen in the episode list.
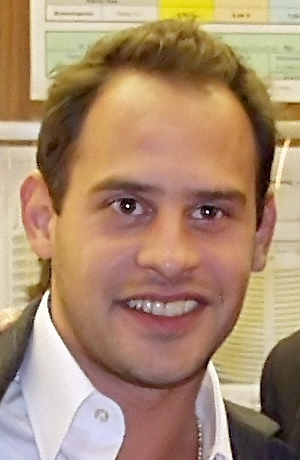
Moritz Bleibtreu (2004)

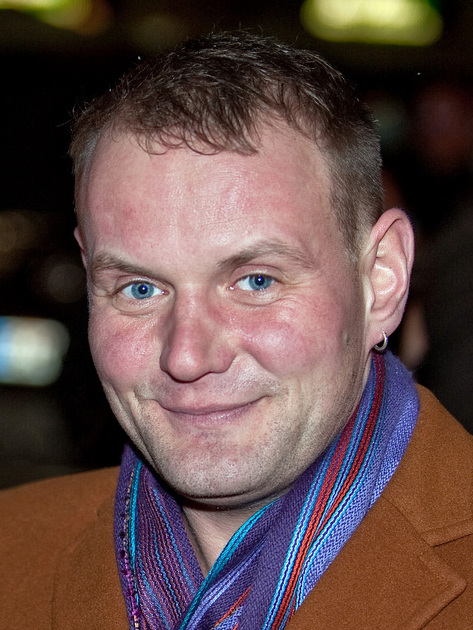
Devid Stresow (2010)

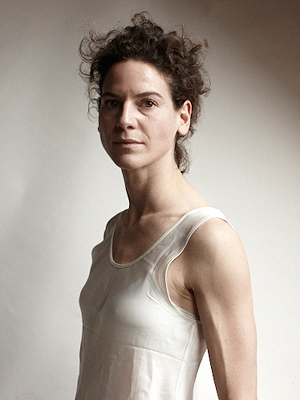
Bibiana Beglau (2009)

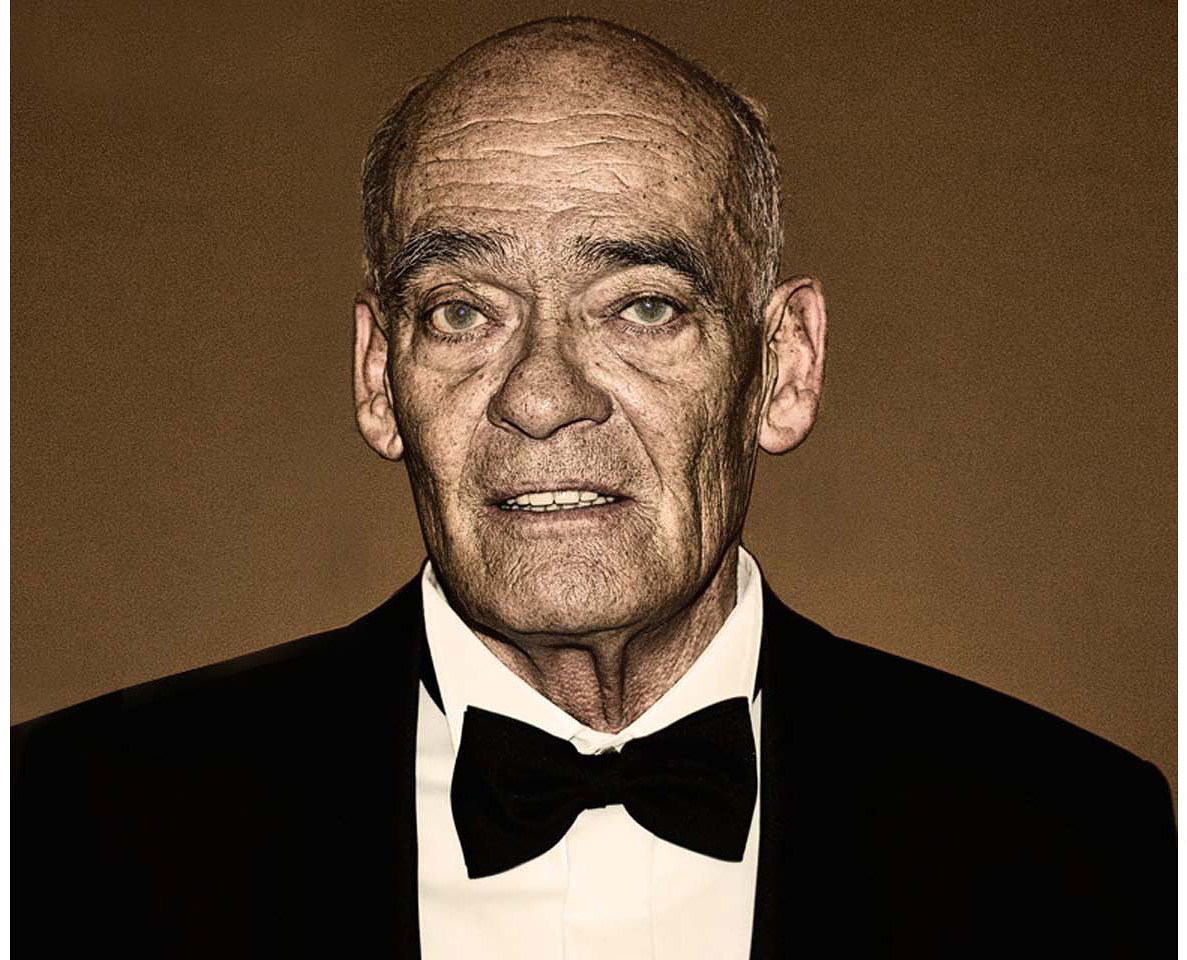
Hans-Michael Rehberg (2011)

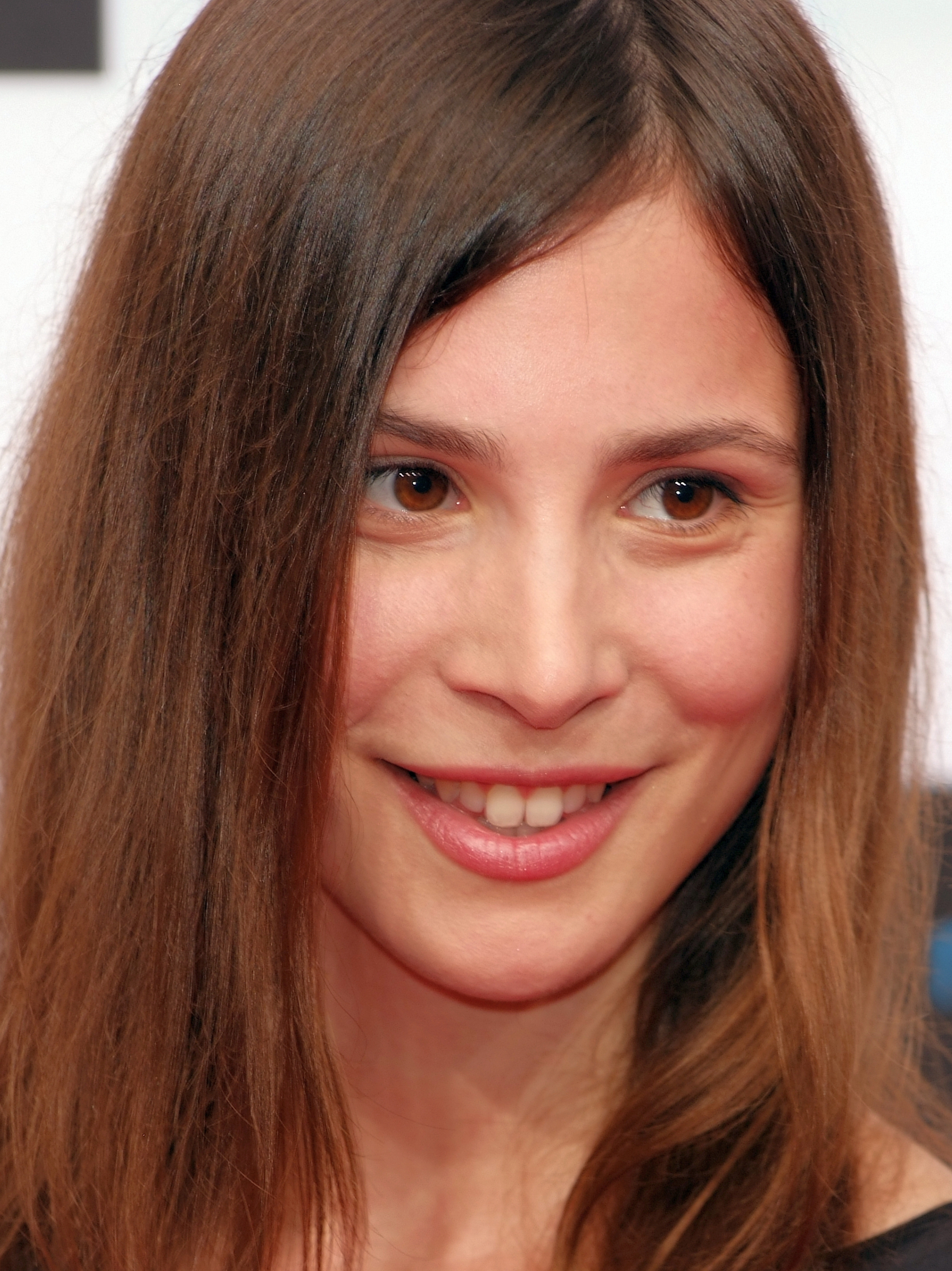
Aylin Tezel (2012)

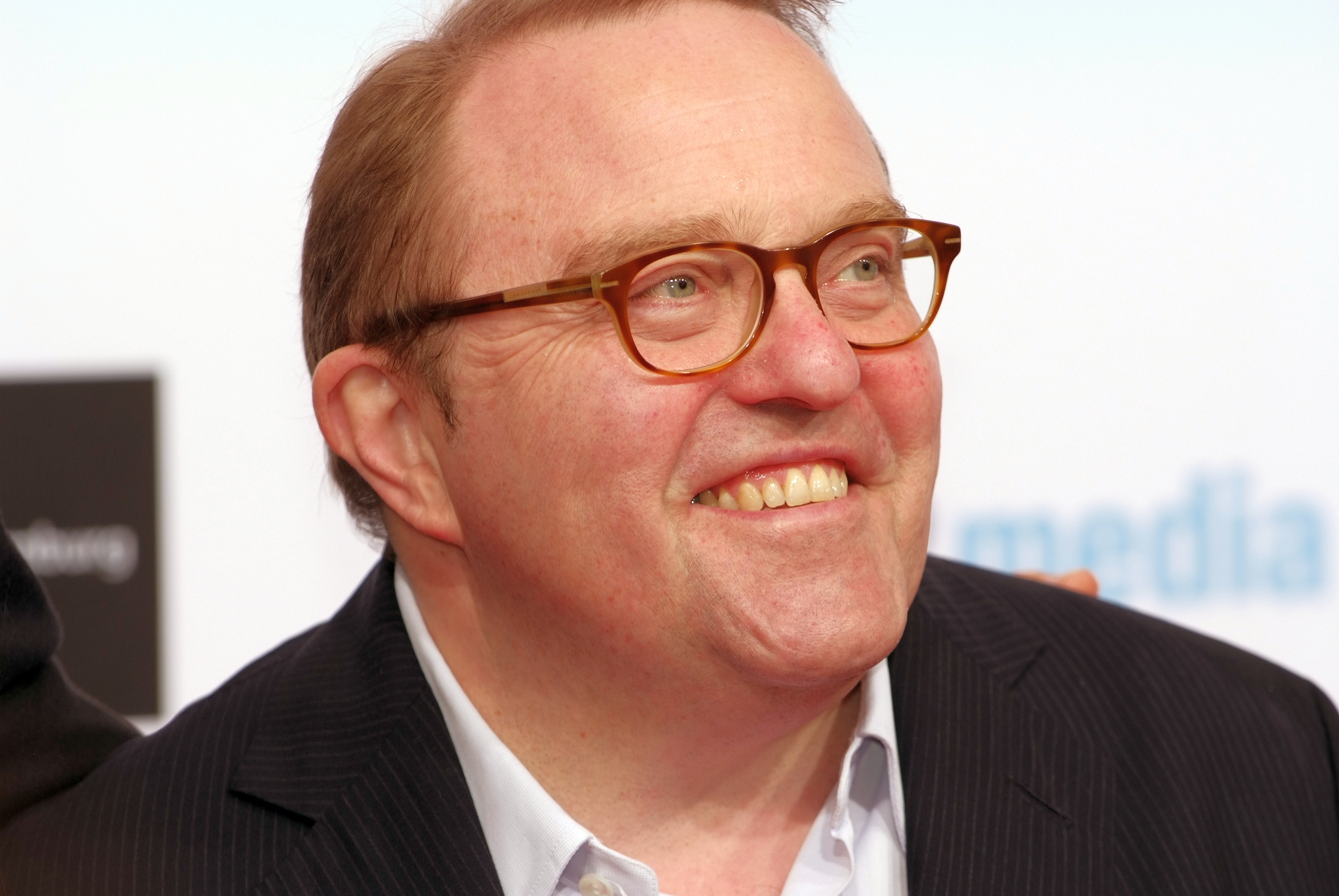
Gustav Peter Wöhler (2012)

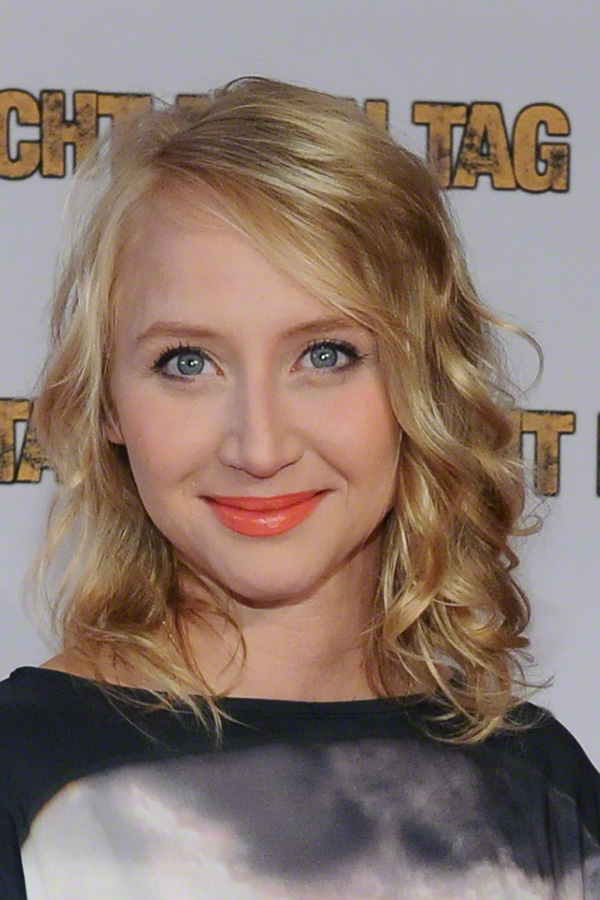
Anna Maria Mühe (2014)

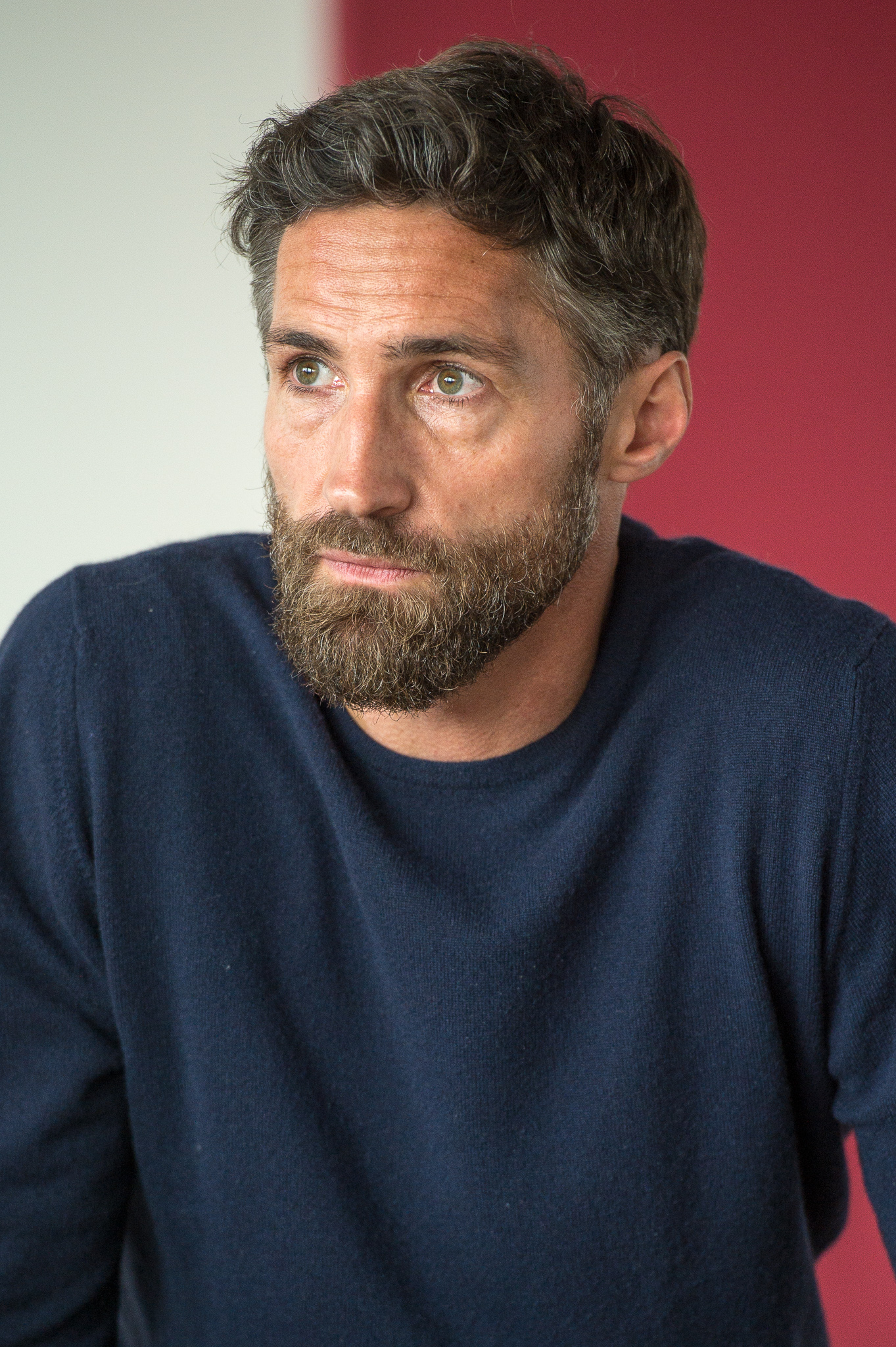
Benjamin Sadler (2015)

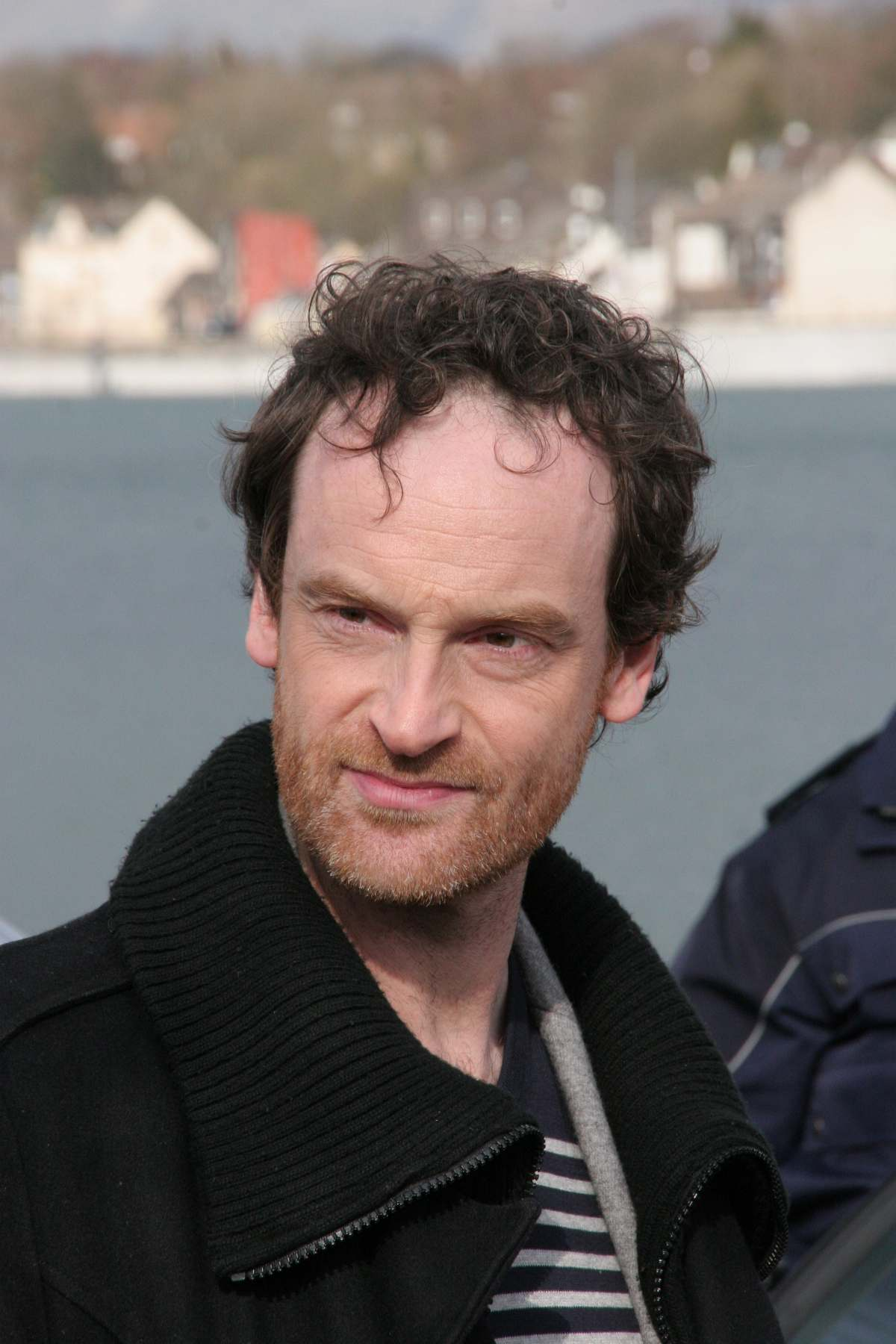
Jörg Hartmann (2012)

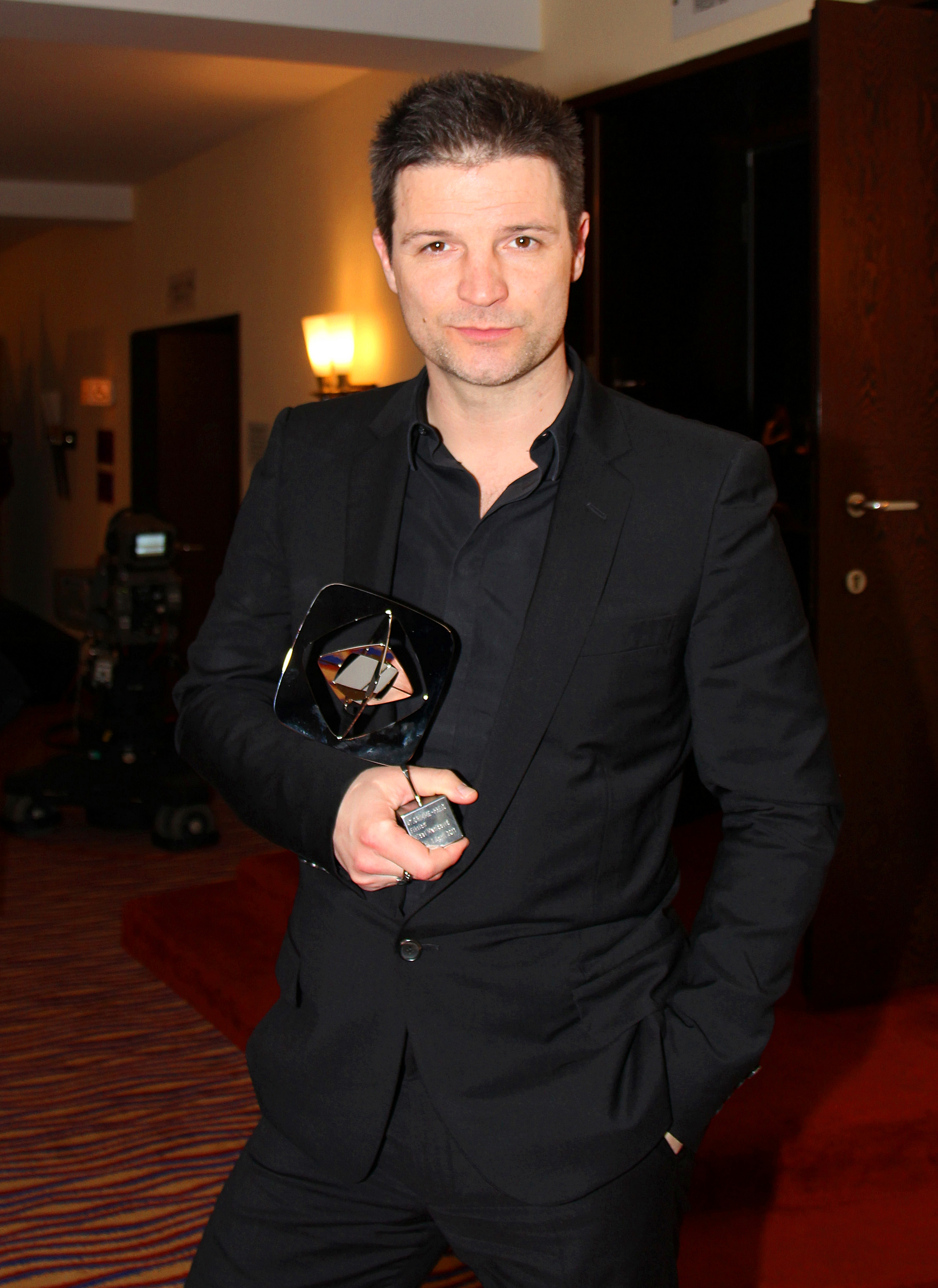
Mišel Matičević (2011)

== Episodes ==
No.	Title	Directed by	Written by	Original release date	Prod. code	German viewers (millions)
1	"Der Andere"	Maris Pfeiffer	Nina Grosse	20 February 2015	104	4.22
Guest stars: Devid Striesow as Thorsten Paulsberg, Bibiana Beglau as Lissy Paulsberg, Matthias Matschke as Rüdiger Timmer, Barnaby Metschurat as Sven, Susanne Bormann as Katja, Anna Stieblich as Vorsitzende Richterin, Peter Schneider as Staatsanwalt, Claudia Eisinger as Rezeptionistin
2	"Schnee"	Maris Pfeiffer	André Georgi, Jan Ehlert	27 February 2015	105	3.45
Guest stars: Hans-Michael Rehberg as Karl-Heinz Gronau, Aylin Tezel as Jana, Edin Hasanović as Hassan, Thure Lindhardt as Gerber, Gustav Peter Wöhler as Richter Lamprecht, Emily Cox as Ulrike Gronau, Maren Kroymann as Richterin
3	"Ausgleich"	Maris Pfeiffer	Jobst Christian Oetzmann	6 March 2015	106	4.95
Guest stars: Anna Maria Mühe as Alexandra Läufer, Benjamin Sadler as Thomas Läufer, Ludwig Trepte as Felix, Gitta Schweighöfer as Alexandras Mutter, Achim Hübner as Alexandras Großvater, Samuel Finzi as Richter Falk, Uwe Preuss as Staatsanwalt Kaulbach, Maximilian Dirr as Sachverständiger Bahnert
4	"Die Illuminaten"	Hannu Salonen	André Georgi	13 March 2015	102	3.57
Guest stars: Jörg Hartmann as Johannes Deittert, Max Hegewald as Henry, Jannik Schümann as Lukas, Teresa Harder as Marguerite Verdier, Lisa Maria Potthoff as Anna Kremer, Godehard Giese as Jürgen Kremer, Ceci Chuh as Francesca, Merlin Rose as Max, Til Schindler as Philipp
5	"DNA"	Hannu Salonen	Jobst Christian Oetzmann	20 March 2015	101	3.78
Guest stars: Alina Levshin as Nina Deggert, Mišel Matičević as Thomas Deggert, Rainer Reiners as Herrmann, Dirk Borchardt as Hauptkommissar, Frank Leo Schröder as Staatsanwalt, Anian Zollner as Siegfried Schubert, Bernhard Conrad as Jürgen Kremer
6	"Volksfest"	Hannu Salonen	André Georgi	27 March 2015	103	4.21
Guest stars: Michael Gwisdek as Alexander Albrecht, Richard Sammel as Staatsanwalt Wendland, Max Herbrechter as Jürgen Nolting, Helga Wretman as Marion Nolting, Adrian Topol as Claus Jakobi, Rick Okon as Polizist Steinmann, Pheline Roggan as Sekretärin

== Production ==
The serie is produced by Moovie – the art of entertainment. The filming have started in early April 2014 and lasted until the end of July 2014. It was filmed in and around Berlin, the backdrop of the boarding school is located in Naumburg. The 6th episode was filmed partly in Helmstedt.

== Literature ==
- Ferdinand von Schirach: Schuld. Piper Verlag, München 2010, ISBN 978-3492054225.

== See also ==
- List of German television series
