= Stadtlandliebe =

- Theatrical release poster
- Directed by: Marco Kreuzpaintner
- Written by: Conni Lubek
- Produced by: Alexander Thies; Clemens Schaeffer
- Starring: Jessica Schwarz; Tom Beck; Uwe Ochsenknecht; Gisa Flake; Christine Schorn
- Cinematography: Ueli Steiger
- Edited by: Claus Wehlisch
- Music by: Eike Hosenfeld; Tim Stanzel
- Production companies: NFP; Warner Bros. Film Productions Germany
- Distributed by: Warner Bros. Pictures
- Release date: 7 July 2016
- Country: Germany
- Language: German

Stadtlandliebe is a 2016 German comedy film directed by Marco Kreuzpaintner and released on 7 July 2016, by Warner Bros. Pictures.

== Plot ==
A couple moves from Berlin to a village looking for a more meaningful life.

== Cast ==
- Jessica Schwarz as Anna
- Tom Beck as Sam
- Uwe Ochsenknecht as Volker Garms
- Gisa Flake as Gertie
- Christine Schorn as Agathe
- Horst Sachtleben as Opa Döppe
- Vladimir Burlakov as Lou
- Hannes Wegener as Günni
- Anna Thalbach as Friedel
- Laura Schuhrk as Gitta

== Reception ==
Kino-Zeit reviewed the film, criticizing it as being too predictable and for its crude humor.
