= Paradise (2023 German film) =

- Directed by: Boris Kunz
- Screenplay by: Boris Kunz; Simon Amberger; Peter Kocyla
- Produced by: Nathalie Bouteiller-Marin; Nina Kammermeier
- Starring: Kostja Ullmann; Corinna Kirchhoff; Marlene Tanczik; Iris Berben; Lisa-Marie Koroll; Lorna Ishema; Numan Acar; Alina Levshin; Lisa Loven Kongsli
- Cinematography: Christian Stangassinger
- Edited by: Max Fey
- Music by: David Reichelt
- Production companies: NEUESUPER; PixStone Images; Respeecher
- Distributed by: Netflix
- Release dates: 24 June 2023 (Filmfest München); 27 July 2023 (Digital streaming)
- Running time: 127 minutes
- Countries: Germany; Lithuania
- Languages: German; English

Paradise is a 2023 German dystopian science fiction thriller film directed by Boris Kunz, starring Kostja Ullmann, Iris Berben, Lisa-Marie Koroll, Numan Acar, Alina Levshin and Lisa Loven Kongsli, premiering at Filmfest München on June 24, 2023, and released on Netflix on July 27, 2023.

== Plot ==
The biotech startup Aeon, under the leadership of its founder Sophie Theissen, has grown into a multi-billion-dollar corporation. The company transfers years of life from young people to willing donors through a medical procedure, who financially compensate the donors. The procedure requires unspecified genetic matches between donor and recipient, cataloged through cheek swabs. A collective known as "The Adam Group" opposes Aeon's technology and actively and violently opposes it. Their leader, Lilith, and her followers carry out several attacks on recipients of transferred life years.

Max Toma, an Aeon representative, persuades people to part with their years. He speaks from personal experience, having traded five years of his life to finance his studies. Max is a staunch supporter of his employer and appreciates the obvious benefits of the age exchange. His work has allowed him and his wife, Elena, to afford a luxurious apartment. He is unaware that his wife has pledged 40 years of debt as a condition of the loan. When their apartment burns down, the insurance company refuses to pay, arguing that the cause was Elena's carelessness. Max tries to negotiate with Sophie, but only manages to secure a marginally better job that doesn't provide enough money. When they can no longer repay the loan, Elena is arrested by the authorities and undergoes an operation at Aeon. During this procedure, 38 years are removed from her life. This causes her body to age abruptly, and within a few days, she becomes an old woman.

Max suspects that Sophie received Elena's years of her life to rejuvenate herself, as she needs more time for research and refining the age-donation procedure. It turns out that Sophie had already identified Elena as a suitable time donor years earlier and had set Max on her. However, Max fell in love with Elena, and the two married. To ensure Sophie still received her time donation, she set fire to their apartment. Max is furious and, with the help of an underground organization in Lithuania, plans to reverse the donation. He kidnaps the young Sophie, vandalizes the grave of Sophie's daughter Lucy who died of progeria and flees with Elena. However, it turns out that Max hasn't kidnapped Sophie, but her daughter Marie. He still intends to carry out his plan to teach Sophie a lesson. Elena is initially reluctant to accept Max's plan. However, since the two want to start a family, she eventually agrees.

The trio is captured by the Adam group. Lilith plans to lure Sophie into a trap and kill her. Max helps her because she threatens to kill Elena. A rejuvenated Sophie does indeed appear and wants to speak with her daughter. A confrontation ensues, during which Sophie is shot. The Adam group also suffers several casualties, including Lilith. Elena and Max manage to escape with Marie. They head to Dr. Berg, who is supposed to reverse the time donation. Max begins to have second thoughts about his plan, realizing that he's no better than Sophie. He confesses to Elena that he wants to abandon the plan. However, she refuses and throws Max out of the car. Upon arriving at their destination, she has the donation reversed using Marie as the donor. Marie is then rescued by her mother's security detail. However, she realizes that her mother has no intention of reversing her time donation, at least not for the time being.

Some time later, Max observes the pregnant Elena with a new man. Max is now the leader of the Adam group and organizes a raid on an Aeon campus.

== Cast ==
- Kostja Ullmann as Max
- Corinna Kirchhoff as Elena (old)
- Marlene Tanczik as Elena (young)
- Iris Berben as Sophie Theissen (old)
- Alina Levshin as Sophie Theissen (young)
- Lisa-Marie Koroll as Marie Theissen
- Lorna Ishema as Kaya
- Numan Acar as Viktor
- Tom Böttcher as Nils
- Gizem Emre as Professor Eva (clinic)
- Lisa Loven Kongsli as Lilith
- Cornelia Heyse as Marion (Elena's Mum)
- Andreas Windhuis as Vater von Elena
- Haley Louise Jones as Luna Ackermann

== Production ==
The production was announced by Netflix in March 2022. Filming took place between March 22, 2022, and June 12, 2022, over 53 days in Palanga, Klaipėda, Kaunas, Vilnius and Berlin.

== Reception ==
=== Critical response ===
As per Rotten Tomatoes, the film received 50% based on 10 critic reviews. Kathleen Hildebrand of the Süddeutsche Zeitung judged that the film evokes a carpe diem feeling which is “rare in the dystopian film genre”.

Ulf Lepelmeier of Filmstarts believes the film is "a successful Netflix sci-fi blockbuster – from Germany!" He also praises the film for its "exciting premise, strong acting performances, and an emotionally gripping first half hour." Furthermore, he notes its "socially critical elements."

According to Netflix, in its first week of release, the film reached 16.1 million viewing hours, which translates to 8.1 million viewers. This made it the most-watched non-English language film.

== External link ==
- Netflix - Paradise
- Paradise at IMDb
