= Christmas Crossfire =

2020 film

- German: Wir können nicht anders
- Directed by: Detlev Buck
- Written by: Martin Behnke; Detlev Buck
- Starring: Kostja Ullmann; Alli Neumann; Sascha Alexander Gersak
- Production companies: DCM Productions; Boje Buck Produktion
- Release date: 4 December 2020
- Running time: 105 minutes
- Country: Germany
- Language: German

Christmas Crossfire (German: Wir können nicht anders, lit. 'We can't help it') is a 2020 German comedy film directed by Detlev Buck, written by Martin Behnke and Detlev Buck and starring Kostja Ullmann, Alli Neumann and Sascha Alexander Gersak.

== Cast ==
- Kostja Ullmann as Samuel
- Alli Neumann as Edda
- Sascha Alexander Gersak as Herrmann
- Sophia Thomalla as Katja
- Merlin Rose as Rudi
- Peter Kurth as Rainer
- Detlev Buck as Sigi Köhler
- Anika Mauer as Antje Köhler
- Frederic Linkemann as Frank
- Bernd Hölscher as Wolf
- Karsten Mielke as Norbert
- Malte Thomsen as Ronny
- Roman Schomburg as Thoralf
- Jakob Schmidt as Steffen
- Steffen Scheumann as Bernd
