= Trade (film) =

- Promotional poster
- Directed by: Marco Kreuzpaintner
- Screenplay by: Jose Rivera
- Story by: Peter Landesman; Jose Rivera
- Based on: "The Girls Next Door" by Peter Landesman
- Produced by: Roland Emmerich; Rosilyn Heller
- Starring: Kevin Kline; Cesar Ramos; Paulina Gaitán; Alicja Bachleda
- Cinematography: Daniel Gottschalk
- Edited by: Hansjörg Weißbrich
- Music by: Leonardo Heiblum; Jacabo Lieberman
- Production companies: Centropolis Entertainment; VIP Medienfonds
- Distributed by: Roadside Attractions; Lionsgate (United States); 20th Century Fox (Germany)
- Release date: September 28, 2007
- Running time: 120 minutes
- Countries: United States; Germany
- Languages: English; Spanish; Polish; Russian
- Box office: $1.4 million

Trade is a 2007 drama film directed by Marco Kreuzpaintner and starring Kevin Kline. It was produced by Roland Emmerich and Rosilyn Heller. The film premiered January 23, 2007, at the 2007 Sundance Film Festival and opened in limited release on September 28, 2007. It is based on Peter Landesman's article "The Girls Next Door" about sex slaves, which was featured as the cover story in the January 24, 2004, issue of The New York Times Magazine.

== Plot ==
The film follows two people who are kidnapped by an international sexual slavery gang in Mexico City. Adriana (Gaitán), a 13-year-old local girl, is captured while riding the bike her brother, Jorge, got for her birthday. Veronica (Bachleda), a young woman from Poland, is kidnapped upon arriving at the airport, while her friend is killed after being hit by a vehicle trying to escape. She soon realizes that the whole modeling agency was a facade in which she was duped into a sex trafficking web orchestrated by the gang led by Russian gangster Vadim Youchenko. They are held captive and drugged along with some Latin American women and a young Thai boy.

Jorge, who made a living swindling and robbing tourists in the Zócalo, learns that his sister was kidnapped. He asks his friends to help him find her, but they balk when they learn how powerful the gang is. Jorge finds out that the kidnappers "sell" their victims as sex slaves through a connection in New Jersey. While searching for Adriana, he sees her among the other victims as they are hurried into a van by the kidnappers. He steals his friends' car and manages to follow the van to Juárez, but then loses track of it.

Adriana, Veronica, a Brazilian girl, and the Thai boy are smuggled into the US by Manuelo, a Mexican coyote, with the help of corrupt Federales and are forced to pose for a photo op, but after crossing the border, the group is caught in the middle of the night by the US Border Patrol. Manuelo keeps the kidnapped people from telling the agents that they were kidnapped by threatening to harm them and their families. Despite that, Veronica failed to convince the agents. Manuelo and the victims are sent back to Mexico, after which they sneak into the US again, this time during the daytime, in which Alex Green, a U.S. smuggler working with Traffickers, assists Manuelo in moving the victims.

When Jorge finds the safehouse in Juárez where the victims were kept, they are already gone. An American, Ray (Kline), also arrives to investigate the house. Jorge hides in the trunk of his car, revealing himself once they have crossed the U.S.-Mexico Border back into Texas. Ray assumed that Jorge was an illegal immigrant sneaking into the country, but after learning of his sisters abduction, he decides to help Jorge in rescuing his sister. Jorge learns that Ray is a Texas Ranger who was in Juárez to search for his estranged daughter, who may have also been a victim of the gang. They agree to travel to New Jersey, where the victims are being taken and where an internet auction will be held to sell them to the highest bidder. At a rest-stop diner with Ray, Jorge recognizes the young Thai boy the gang held captive. Ray frees him and forces the man who had purchased him to give him access to the auction before turning him over to the police.

The Brazilian girl OD's at a hotel and Manuelo and Alex pimp out Adriana and Veronica at various stops to acquire cash. At a stop, Adriana and Veronica manage to flee to a rural town. Veronica sees a policeman and tells Adriana to alert him, while Veronica herself phones her parents in Poland to warn them of her abduction, but learns that her little son has already been taken as collateral by the criminal organization. Adriana fails to tell the policeman, and during the phone call Adriana and Veronica are recaptured by the kidnappers. At another stop, Veronica commits suicide by jumping from a cliff, telling Manuelo that he will pay for his sins. Manuelo arrives in Jersey with Adriana at a house where his boss, Laura, keeps more victims. Laura scolds Manuelo for letting Veronica and the Brazilian die.

Ray and Jorge reach New Jersey and seek help from the state police for aid in rescuing Adriana, but they refuse as it would disrupt their strategy against the gang's larger criminal organization. Ray, assisted by Jorge, then participates in the auction, to discover Adriana's name and age were fabricated, but manages to win the bid at $32,000, in an effort to free her. Shortly after, Ray meets Manuelo and rides with him to the house blindfolded with the money, while Jorge trails them, but at the house, Ray asks Laura a personal question, which makes her suspicious. He then has to prove that he is not a cop by having sex with Adriana before leaving. In the bedroom, Adriana learns that Ray is a cop and is assisting Jorge. She then leaves blood on the sheets as per Laura's request. Manuelo catch her in the act and Adriana convinces him to let them leave. As they were prepared to leave, Jorge knocks out Manuelo with a tire iron, prompting Laura to draw a gun, and the police, who were staking out the house after all, arrest Laura and Manuelo, and free several children they find stowed away in the basement. Ray hands Jorge the bag of cash used in the bag, but Jorge chose to sneak the bag back in Rays car. The siblings are flown back to Mexico City, where Adriana is joyfully reunited with her mother, while Jorge tracks down Vadim in which he stabbed him. After killing Vadim and preparing to walk away, Vadim's young son exits the home, calling for his father, putting Jorge in a guilt-stricken state.

== Cast ==
- Kevin Kline as Ray Sheridan, a fraud investigator who helps Jorge search for his sister when he finds him.
- Cesar Ramos as Jorge, the trouble making 17-year-old brother of Adriana.
- Alicja Bachleda as Veronica, a Polish tourist who is kidnapped.
- Paulina Gaitán as Adriana, Jorge's younger sister who is also kidnapped.
- Marco Pérez as Manuelo, a Mexican coyote who smuggles abductees across the US-Mexico border
- Linda Emond as Patty Sheridan, Ray's wife
- Zack Ward as Alex Green, an American smuggler working with the Traffickers
- Kate del Castillo as Laura, the mastermind of the Sex Trafficking trade network based in New Jersey
- Tim Reid as Hank Jefferson
- Pasha D. Lychnikoff as Vadim Youchenko, a Russian gangster in charge of the trafficking ring in Mexico City
- Natalia Traven as Lupe
- José Sefami as Don Victor, a crime lord carrying knowledge of Mexico City crime network
- Leland Pascual as Thai Boy, a ten-year-old boy who is also kidnapped

== Production ==
In February 2004, it was reported that Roland Emmerich had struck a deal to adapt Peter Landesman's New York Times Magazine story "The Girls Next Door" into a feature film that he would direct and produce. He developed it alongside Landesman and Rosilyn Heller; the article was optioned with their own funds, and it was indicated at the time that Emmerich would not seek studio financing until the script was finished.

Following the release of his first film Summer Storm, director Marco Kreuzpaintner was contacted by Emmerich who was impressed by his debut film and struck up a dialogue with Kreuzpaintner. During one of Kreuzpaintner's visits to Emmerich in Los Angeles, Kreuzpaintner came across the script for the film, titled Trade, in Emmerich's office. Kreuzpaintner confessed to jealousy at Emmerich being attached to direct the script. Emmerich had already been looking for another director for Trade due to his commitments to 10,000 BC and offered Kreuzpaintner the job.

== Release ==
=== Box office ===
The film opened in limited release in the United States and Canada on September 28, 2007, and grossed an estimated $114,000 in 90 theaters, an average of $1,266 per theater.

=== Critical reception ===
Trade received mixed to negative reviews from critics. On review aggregator website Rotten Tomatoes, the film holds a 34% approval rating, based on 73 reviews with an average rating of 5/10. The website's critics consensus reads: "With an exploitative style that seems more suited for TV shows like CSI, Trade's message about the reality of child exploitation is easily lost". On Metacritic, the film had an average score of 42 out of 100, based on 22 reviews indicating "mixed or average reviews".

Robert Koehler of Variety said that "With all of the earmarks of being a serious and thoughtful drama written and based on Peter Landesman's investigative work on the international sex slave trade network, it comes as something of a shock to discover that the final film is little more than a exploitative thriller".

Jeannette Catsoulis of The New York Times called Trade "[a]n eagerly prurient dip into the sex-trafficking trough", adding that "[it] teeters between earnest exposé and salacious melodrama, but criticizing film's "near-visible weight of conscience", which if not for it, would have guaranteed a success in the second category.

== See also ==
- Abduction of Chloe Ayling
