= Aylin Tezel =

German actress and dancer

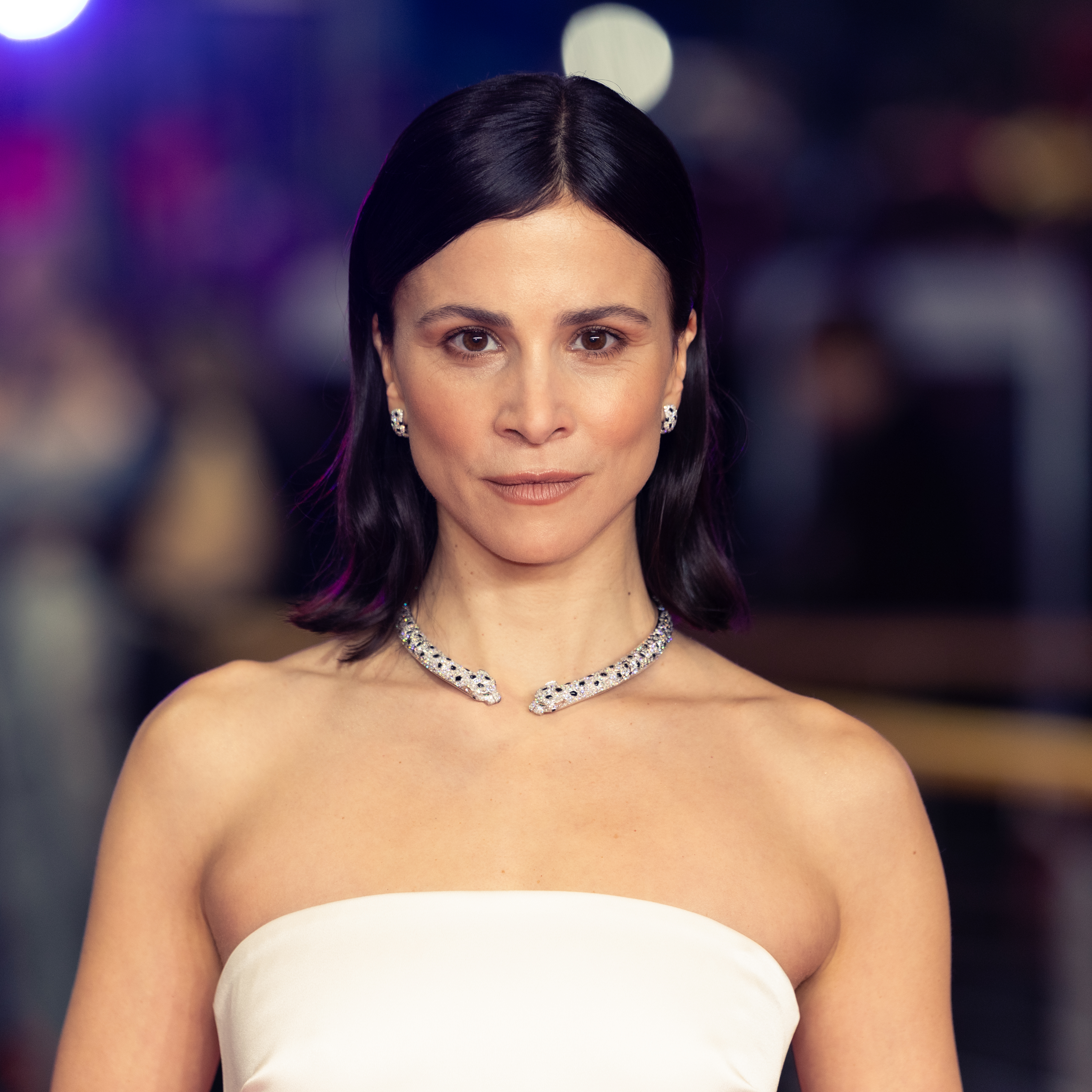
- Tezel in 2026
- Born: Bünde, West Germany
- Occupations: Film and television actress
- Years active: 2007–present

Aylin Tezel (German: [ˈaɪlɪn ˈteːtsl̩]) is a German actress, writer, and director. She gained recognition for her leading role in Almanya - Welcome to Germany, which premiered at the Berlin International Film Festival in 2011, and for her performance in Am Himmel der Tag (English title: Breaking Horizons), for which she received the Best Actress Award at the Torino Film Festival in 2012. In 2023, she made her feature directorial debut with Falling Into Place, which won the International Federation of Film Critics (FIPRESCI) Prize at the 27th Tallinn Black Nights Film Festival.

== Early life and education ==
Aylin Tezel was born in Germany to a Turkish father and a German mother. She never learned to speak Turkish at home.

== Career ==
After making her feature film debut in the arthouse drama Innocence (2008), Tezel played a central role in Oliver Kienle's award-winning film Stronger Than Blood, which received a First Steps Award in 2010.

Tezel gained wider recognition for her performance in Yasemin Şamdereli's Almanya - Welcome to Germany. The film premiered at the 61st Berlin International Film Festival, won the Deutscher Filmpreis (German Film Award) in 2011 and was a commercial success in German cinemas. It was subsequently released theatrically in numerous other countries.

At Christmas 2011, Tezel appeared as Cinderella in Uwe Janson's television film Aschenputtel. Soon afterwards, she joined Tatort, one of Germany's most popular crime television series, in the recurring role of young police officer Nora Dalay.

Irish director Shimmy Marcus cast Tezel in the leading role of his short film Rhinos (2011). The film premiered at the CFC Worldwide Short Film Festival in Toronto, Canada, and was nominated for an award at the Irish Film & Television Awards in 2013.

In 2012, Tezel starred in the feature films 3 Zimmer/Küche/Bad (English title: Move) and Breaking Horizons (original title: Am Himmel der Tag). Directed by Pola Beck, Breaking Horizons won the award for Best Film in the German-language feature film competition at the eighth Zurich Film Festival. Tezel received the Best Actress Award at the 30th Torino Film Festival for her performance.

Tezel subsequently appeared in Marco Kreuzpaintner's feature film Coming In, released by Warner Bros. in October 2014. She played the female lead, Heidi, who falls in love with a gay celebrity hairdresser portrayed by Kostja Ullmann.

In Macho Man, the film adaptation of a German bestselling novel, she played the female lead alongside German actor Christian Ulmen and Danish actor Dar Salim. The film was released by Universum Film in 2015.

Tezel also played the female lead, Sabine, in Robert Manson's English-language debut feature film Lost in the Living. The film was released theatrically in Ireland and Germany in 2017 and was later acquired by Amazon Prime.

To improve her opportunities for English-language roles, Tezel took voice lessons in London with the late voice coach Julia Wilson-Dickson.

In 2017, Tezel had a recurring role in the Canadian CBC Television spy thriller series X Company. She portrayed Zosia, a Polish-Jewish resistance fighter, in six episodes of the third season, appearing alongside Warren Brown and Evelyne Brochu. For the role, she spoke English with a Polish accent.

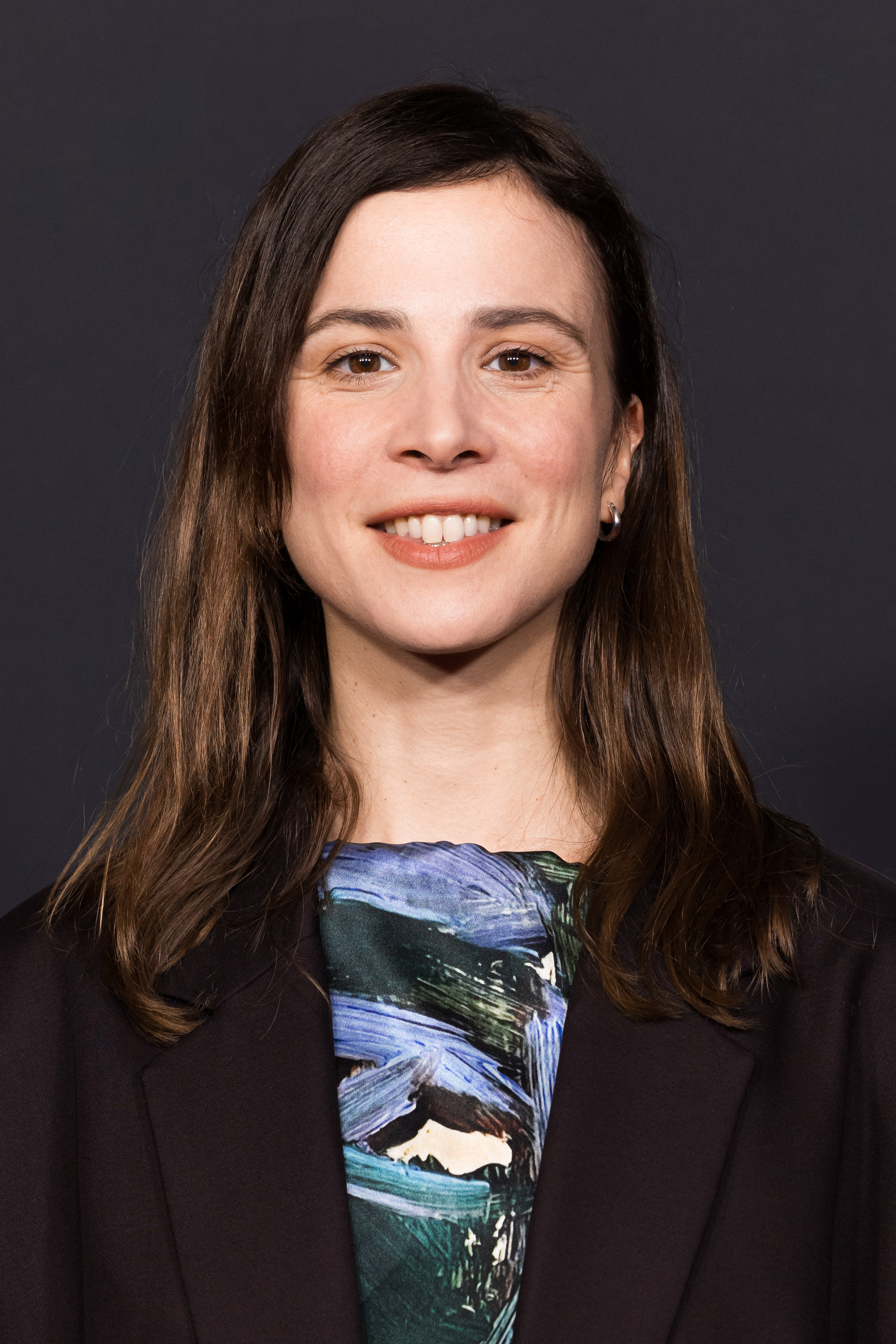
Tezel in 2024

In June 2020, Amazon Studios released the thriller 7500, following its competition premiere at the Locarno Festival and its theatrical release in Germany and Austria. The film stars Joseph Gordon-Levitt as a co-pilot whose aircraft is hijacked. Tezel plays his girlfriend, flight attendant Gökce.

In February 2021, ZDFneo released the six-part miniseries Unbroken, in which Tezel plays the lead role of Alex, a determined police officer searching for her child after being abducted. After its first week of streaming, the series was announced as ZDFneo's most successful television production on ZDF's streaming platform, ZDF Mediathek.

Tezel also wrote and directed the short film Phoenix (2020), starring Irish actors Killian Scott and Bríd Brennan, alongside German actress Leonie Benesch. The film premiered at the Max Ophüls Festival.

In 2023, Tezel made her feature directorial debut with the romantic drama Falling Into Place, which she also wrote and starred in alongside Chris Fulton. The film had its European premiere in the First Feature Competition at the 27th Tallinn Black Nights Film Festival, where it received the FIPRESCI Prize. It subsequently won several further awards and was scheduled for release in several European countries, as well as in Australia and New Zealand.

In 2026 she stars in the Canal+ TV series, Apollo Has Fallen.

== Selected filmography ==
Year	Title	Original title	Role	Notes
2007	Whom Honor Is Due	Wem Ehre gebührt	Selda Özkan (L)	Episode of the television crime series Tatort.
2008	Innocence	Unschuld	Derya (L)	
2009	Stronger Than Blood	Bis aufs Blut – Brüder auf Bewährung	Sina (S)	First Steps Award 2010.
2010	Bloch	Bloch – Inshallah	Dalia (L)	Television film.
2011	Almanya - Welcome to Germany	Almanya – Willkommen in Deutschland	Canan (L)	Screened in competition at the 61st Berlin International Film Festival. Won the 2011 Deutscher Filmpreis for Best Film and Best Screenplay.
2011	Cinderella	Aschenputtel	Cinderella (L)	Television film.
2012	Move	3 Zimmer/Küche/Bad	Maria (L)	
2012	Breaking Horizons	Am Himmel der Tag	Lara (L)	Best German-Language Film at the Zurich Film Festival (2012); Best Actress at the Torino Film Festival (2012); Best Upcoming Actress at the German Actors Awards (2013); Best Actress at the Sehsüchte Film Festival (2013).
2012	Rhinos	Rhinos	Ingrid (L)	Short film. Nominated for Best Short Film at the Irish Film & Television Awards (2012). Won the Prix du Public for Best Film at the Brest European Short Film Festival (2012) and the Audience Award for Best International Short Film at the Corona Cork Film Festival (2012).
2012–2019	Tatort	Tatort Dortmund	Nora Dalay (L)	Television series; 14 episodes.
2013	Kleine Schiffe	Kleine Schiffe	Lilli (L)	Television film.
2013	Inhale	Tanz mit ihr	She (L)	Short film. Tezel served as director, producer, actress and choreographer. Screened at the Berlin & Beyond Film Festival in San Francisco and the Cork Film Festival. Scheduled for release on Arte in 2015.
2014	Coming In	Coming In	Heidi (L)	
2014	To Life!	Auf das Leben!	Emily (S)	Vienna Film Award 2015.
2015	Macho Man	Macho Man	Aylin (L)	Released on 29 October 2015. Tezel plays a lead character who shares her first name.
2015	Lost in the Living	Lost in the Living	Sabine (L)	Tezel's first leading role in an English-language film. Released on DVD on 28 September 2018.
2015	Why Is This Night Different?	Why Is This Night Different?	Amena (S)	Episode of the television series Homeland, broadcast on 25 October 2015.
2016	The Informant	Die Informantin	Aylin (L)	Television film, broadcast on 19 March 2016. Tezel plays a lead character who shares her first name.
2017	X Company	X Company	Zosia (S)	Canadian television series. Tezel guest-starred as a Polish-Jewish resistance fighter in episodes 4, 5, 6, 7, 8 and 10 of the third season. She spoke English with a Polish accent for the role.
2017	Between Heaven and Hell	Zwischen Himmel und Hölle	Ottilie von Gersen (S)	Television film. Tezel portrays a historical figure in a drama about the Protestant Reformation. Broadcast on the 500th anniversary of the Reformation and also shown in the United Kingdom on the BBC with English subtitles.
2019	The Informant 2	Die Informantin – Der Fall Lissabon	Aylin (L)	Television film, broadcast in April 2019. Sequel to The Informant (2016).
2019	The Master Butcher	Der Club der singenden Metzger	Delphine (L)	Miniseries about a group of German emigrants in the 1920s seeking a new home in the United States. Jonas Nay and Tezel play the leading roles. Based on Louise Erdrich's novel The Master Butchers Singing Club, the production was broadcast on German television on 27 December 2019 as a three-hour film. It features dialogue in German and English and was directed by Uli Edel. Tezel received the Bavarian TV Award for her performance in 2020.
2019	7500	7500	Gökce (L)	Thriller about a terrorist hijacking aboard an aircraft. Joseph Gordon-Levitt stars as co-pilot Tobias Ellis, while Tezel plays his girlfriend Gökce, a flight attendant on the same flight. The film was released in German cinemas in December 2019 and internationally on Amazon Prime Video in June 2020.
2021	Unbroken	Unbroken	Alex (L)	German crime drama miniseries about police officer Alexandra Enders, who is nine months pregnant when she is attacked and disappears. Six days later, she wakes up in a forest, covered in blood and without her baby. Distrustful of those around her and struggling with her own inner demons, she tries to discover what happened and find her child. Tezel plays the lead role of Alex. The six-part series premiered on ZDFneo on 23 February 2021. One week later, ZDF announced that it had become the most-watched ZDFneo production on its streaming platform, ZDF Mediathek.
2023	Falling Into Place	Falling Into Place	Kira (L)	Romantic drama set in Scotland and London, following Kira and Ian, who meet briefly during a winter weekend while attempting to escape their personal difficulties. Tezel also wrote and directed the film.
2023	Weekend Rebels	Wochenendrebellen	Fatime (L)	The film follows a father and his autistic son as they visit the stadiums of all 56 football teams in search of the son's favourite club.

== Awards and nominations ==
Year	Award	Category	Project	Result
2012	Torino Film Festival	Best Actress	Breaking Horizons	Won
2013	Askania Award	Shooting Star	Tatort, Aschenputtel, Am Himmel der Tag	Won
2013	Sehsüchte Film Festival	Best Acting	Am Himmel der Tag	Won
2013	German Film Critics Association Awards	Best Actress	Am Himmel der Tag, 3 Zimmer/Küche/Bad	Nominated
2013	German Actors Award	Best Upcoming Actress	Am Himmel der Tag	Won
2013	Hessischer Film-und Kinopreis	Best Actress	Am Himmel der Tag	Nominated
2015	German Actors Award	Best Actress in a Comedy Role	Kleine Schiffe	Won
2015	Jupiter Award	Best TV Actress	Am Himmel der Tag, Tatort	Nominated
2016	Hof International Film Festival	Award for Filmmaker	Filmpreis der Stadt Hof	Won
2019	Festival of Animated Film	Best Voice Actor	Smallfoot	Nominated
2020	Jupiter Award	Best TV Actress	Tatort, Die Informantin – Der Fall Lissabon	Nominated
2020	Bavarian TV Awards	Best Actress	The Master Butcher (original title: Der Club der singenden Metzger)	Won
2021	Deutscher Fernsehpreis	Best Actress	Unbroken	Nominated
2021	Deutsche Akademie für Fernsehen	Best Actress in a Leading Role	Unbroken	Won
2023	Tallinn Black Nights Film Festival	FIPRESCI Award	Falling Into Place	Won
2024	Kinofest Lünen	Best Actress	Falling Into Place	Won
2024	Bavarian Film Awards	Best Newcomer Director	Falling Into Place	Won
2024	Festival del cinema tedesco	Audience Award	Falling Into Place	Won
2024	Raindance Film Festival	Best Debut Director	Falling Into Place	Nominated
2024	Raindance Film Festival	Best Performance in a Debut Feature	Falling Into Place	Nominated
2024	Raindance Film Festival	Best Debut Feature	Falling Into Place	Nominated
