= The Collini Case =

2019 film

- German film poster
- German: Der Fall Collini
- Directed by: Marco Kreuzpaintner
- Screenplay by: Christian Zübert; Robert Gold; Jens-Frederik Otto
- Based on: The Collini Case by Ferdinand von Schirach
- Produced by: Marcel Hartges; Christoph Müller; Kerstin Schmidbauer
- Starring: Elyas M'Barek; Franco Nero; Heiner Lauterbach
- Cinematography: Jakub Bejnarowicz
- Edited by: Johannes Hubrich
- Music by: Ben Lukas Boysen
- Production companies: Constantin Film; SevenPictures Film; Mythos Film; Rolize GmbH & Co.
- Distributed by: Constantin Film
- Release date: 18 April 2019
- Running time: 123 minutes
- Country: Germany
- Language: German
- Box office: $6.9 million

The Collini Case (German: Der Fall Collini) is a 2019 German drama film, directed by Marco Kreuzpaintner. It is based on the eponymous novel by Ferdinand von Schirach.

== Cast ==
- Elyas M'Barek as Caspar Leinen
- Heiner Lauterbach as Richard Mattinger
- Alexandra Maria Lara as Johanna Mayer
- Franco Nero as Fabrizio Collini
- Rainer Bock as Prosecutor Reimers
- Catrin Striebeck as the judge
- Manfred Zapatka as old Hans Meyer
- Jannis Niewöhner as young Hans Meyer
- Pia Stutzenstein as Nina, Caspar's interpreter and eventual secretary
- Peter Prager as Bernhard Leinen, Caspar's father
- Sabine Timoteo as weapon expert

== Reception ==
On the review aggregator website Rotten Tomatoes, 79% of 24 critics' reviews are positive. The website's consensus reads: "It stumbles a bit during its arguments, but strong performances and a suspenseful story help The Collini Case earn a winning verdict."

== Accolades ==
The Collini Case won The Cinema for Peace Award for Justice for 2019.
