= Beat (TV series) =

- Genre: Thriller
- Created by: Marco Kreuzpaintner
- Directed by: Marco Kreuzpaintner
- Starring: Jannis Niewöhner; Karoline Herfurth; Christian Berkel; Alexander Fehling; Hanno Koffler
- Theme music composer: Ben Lukas Boysen
- Country of origin: Germany
- Original language: German
- No. of series: 1
- No. of episodes: 7

Production
- Executive producers: Willi Geike; Dan Maag
- Producers: Lothar Hellinger; Christopher Doll
- Production locations: Berlin, Germany
- Cinematography: Philipp Haberlandt
- Editors: Johannes Hubrich; Alexander Murygin; Anja Siemens
- Running time: 54–70 minutes
- Production companies: Hellinger/Doll Filmproduktion; Pantaleon Films; Warner Bros.

Original release
- Network: Amazon Prime Video
- Release: 9 November 2018

Beat is a German thriller television series, created and directed by Marco Kreuzpaintner, which was first released on Amazon Prime Video on 9 November 2018. After You Are Wanted, it is the second German-language Amazon Original Series. It was awarded a 2019 Grimme-Preis for fiction.

On 30 April 2019, it was announced that Beat would not return for a second season.

== Cast ==
- Jannis Niewöhner as Robert "Beat" Schlag
- Karoline Herfurth as Emilia
- Christian Berkel as Richard Diemer
- Alexander Fehling as Philipp Vossberg
- Hanno Koffler as Paul
- Kostja Ullmann as Jasper Hoff
- Nina Gummich as Janine
- Ludwig Simon as Janik
- Владимир Бурлаков
