= Free Fall (2013 film) =

2013 film by Stephan Lacant

- Theatrical release poster
- German: Freier Fall
- Directed by: Stephan Lacant
- Written by: Karsten Dahlem; Stephan Lacant
- Produced by: Daniel Reich; Christoph Holthof
- Starring: Hanno Koffler; Max Riemelt; Katharina Schüttler; Oliver Bröcker; Stephanie Schönfeld; Britta Hammelstein; Shenja Lacher
- Cinematography: Sten Mende
- Edited by: Monika Schindler
- Music by: Dürbeck & Dohmen
- Production companies: Kurhaus Production; Südwestrundfunk
- Distributed by: Edition Salzgeber
- Release dates: 8 February 2013 (Berlin); 23 May 2013 (Germany)
- Running time: 100 minutes
- Country: Germany
- Language: German
- Box office: $599,721

Free Fall (German: Freier Fall) is a 2013 German drama film directed by Stephan Lacant who also wrote the script with Karsten Dahlem, and starring Hanno Koffler, Max Riemelt, and Katharina Schüttler. The film tells the story of police officer, Marc Borgmann (Koffler), who lives with his pregnant girlfriend, Bettina Bischoff (Schüttler). Whilst on a training course, Borgmann meets fellow police officer, Kay Engel (Riemelt), and a romance develops between the two men. Borgmann is torn between his love for Bettina and his new found feelings for another man. When Engel disappears for a while, Borgmann realises his life is rapidly going into "free fall", as he cannot meet the high expectations of the people he knows.

Filming began in Ludwigsburg, Germany, in the summer of 2012. Freier Fall has been compared to Brokeback Mountain and received good reviews following its première at the Berlin Film Festival on 8 February 2013, and at the Frameline Film Festival in the United States on 21 June 2013. The original motion picture soundtrack written by music duo Dürbeck & Dohmen was released digitally online by MovieScore Media to coincide with the film's opening release on 23 May 2013. It made a box office gross of $599,721.

== Plot ==
Marc Borgmann, a young police officer, is on a training course for the riot control unit. He is struggling at the police academy, being somewhat behind his peers in his physical training. Marc does not initially get along with his roommate at the academy, Kay Engel. They have a physical confrontation during a training exercise, but afterwards Marc apologizes for his aggressive behavior and they become friends. The two begin jogging together regularly, with Kay instructing Marc (on more than one occasion) to "breathe evenly". During one jog, Kay kisses Marc as they share a marijuana cigarette. Marc is reassured by Kay that he was joking. On a subsequent jog the two kiss and Kay gives him a handjob.

Kay is later transferred into Marc's police unit to fill a vacancy, where Marc finds it difficult to ignore him. Kay shows up with a colleague to a bowling alley where Marc and his family are having a game and is introduced to Bettina, Marc's pregnant longtime girlfriend. Marc attempts to stay committed to Bettina and forget about Kay, but goes back to the jogging trail, where Kay is waiting. The two have sex in the rain. Bettina grows suspicious of Marc's activities as Marc continues to have intimate encounters with Kay under the guise of having night shifts; Kay also gives him a key to his apartment. Marc finds himself less able to sexually perform with Bettina, which he explains is due to her pregnancy.

Marc and Kay later go to a gay bar, where Marc takes ecstasy. The next morning, Bettina rebuffs his advances and asks him if he is seeing another woman, which Marc denies. Bettina goes through Marc's phone and finds recent calls from Kay. Bettina gives birth to their son, and Marc tries to cut Kay out his life; however, Kay attempts to contact Marc, leading to a physical altercation with Marc demanding to be left alone.

Marc later finds out that Kay was discovered at a gay bar that the unit raided. He then shows up at Kay's apartment and accuses Kay of going to the bar to find other men to sleep with. Kay calls Marc selfish but says he loves him and that he is not sleeping with anyone else. Marc tries to leave but breaks down in Kay's arms and the two share a kiss.

Later, Kay attacks his fellow officer Limpinski, following a homophobic incident. Marc gets hit in an attempt to separate the two. Kay visits Marc in the hospital, and the two share a kiss that Marc's mother witnesses. After Marc catches up to her, they have an argument and Marc leaves alone. Later, Kay arrives at a party after Bettina's invitation, where Marc's parents tell him to stay away from Marc due to his new family. Marc, overhearing the conversation, tells him to leave.

Marc visits Kay at his apartment to find Kay's face bruised following an altercation with Limpinski. Marc advises him to transfer to another unit, and Kay asks about the future of their relationship. Marc returns the key to his apartment and departs. He returns home to find Bettina packing to leave with their son; she has learned that he has been lying about working night shifts and wants him gone by the time she has returned, questioning Marc's friendship with Kay. Marc visits her at Frank's house, and admits his affair with Kay.

Bettina eventually returns to the house with their son, but there is emotional distance between them. Marc tries to visit Kay at his apartment to find it empty; Kay has moved, also departing from the unit without notice. When Limpinski tries to goad Marc about his relationship with Kay, Marc taunts him, leading Limpinski to assault him. Frank witnesses this and implies that Limpinski will be let go. Marc, unhappy, visits the gay bar alone, and though he initiates a sexual encounter with another man, he ends up rebuffing him. Back at the house, Marc and Bettina admit to each other that they cannot see their relationship continuing. The film concludes with Marc at the academy, on a jog with his peers as in the first scene of the film; he outpaces them and runs ahead, alone.

== Cast ==
- Hanno Koffler as Marc Borgmann
- Max Riemelt as Kay Engel
- Katharina Schüttler as Bettina Bischoff
- Oliver Bröcker as Frank Richter
- Stephanie Schönfeld as Claudia Richter
- Britta Hammelstein as Britt Rebmann
- Shenja Lacher as Gregor Limpinski
- Maren Kroymann as Inge Borgmann
- Louis Lamprecht as Wolfgang Borgmann
- Vilmar Bieri as Lothar Bischoff
- Attila Borlan as Werner Brandt
- Horst Krebs as Bernd Eiden
- Samuel Schnepf as Benno Borgmann

== Awards and nominations ==
- 2013: Won Best Film during Philadelphia QFest 2013 (Stephan Lacant and Kurhaus Production)
- 2013: Won Best Director for Stephan Lacant during Filmkunstfest Mecklenburg-Vorpommern 2013
- 2013: Won Best Film for the director and the producers and Special Prize of the Mayor for Hanno Koffler and Max Riemelt during Günter-Rohrbach-Filmpreis 2013
- 2013: Nomination for MFG Star Baden-Baden for Stephan Lacant during Fernsehfilmfestival Baden-Baden
- 2013: Nomination for Best Film and Jury Awards during Berlinale 2013
- 2014: Nomination for Best Actor in a Secondary Role for Hanno Koffler during Deutscher Filmpreis 2014

== Soundtrack ==
Free Fall: Original Soundtrack

Soundtrack album by Dürbeck & Dohmen
- Released: 21 May 2013 (digital only)
- Length: 35:00
- Label: MovieScore Media / AWAL

Dürbeck & Dohmen chronology
Anduni - Fremde Heimat	Free Fall: Original Soundtrack	The Last Mentsch

Professional ratings
Review scores
Source	Rating
eMusic	5/5 stars
Google Play	5/5 stars
iTunes Germany	5/5 stars

Free Fall: Original Soundtrack was composed by Dürbeck & Dohmen, and released via digital download by MovieScore Media and AWAL on 21 May 2013.

No.	Title	Length
1.	"Wrong Turn"	2:32
2.	"Smoking Weed"	2:16
3.	"Under the Shower"	1:34
4.	"Marc Kissed Kay"	1:27
5.	"Nightswimming"	3:19
6.	"Run Away"	1:28
7.	"Keep Breathing Evenly, Pussy!"	1:39
8.	"In the Elevator"	2:13
9.	"The Woods: Love"	2:47
10.	"The Woods: Running"	2:29
11.	"At the Doorstep"	2:47
12.	"Police Operation Aftermath"	2:50
13.	"Abandoned Apartment"	2:23
14.	"Under the Shower II"	2:51
15.	"Heading Home"	1:29
16.	"Back on the Track (Theme of "Free Fall")"	1:44

== Sequel ==
On May 19, 2015, Max Riemelt confirmed that planning about a possible sequel to Free Fall was underway. In late 2016, the website freefall2.com was launched to inform the audience about the conception of a potential sequel.

A 2026 version entitled Free Fall: Who You Are has been released. IMDB states “More than a decade after becoming a cult classic, Free Fall returns — recut, reimagined, reinvented, reborn.”
