= Lisa-Marie Koroll =

German actress

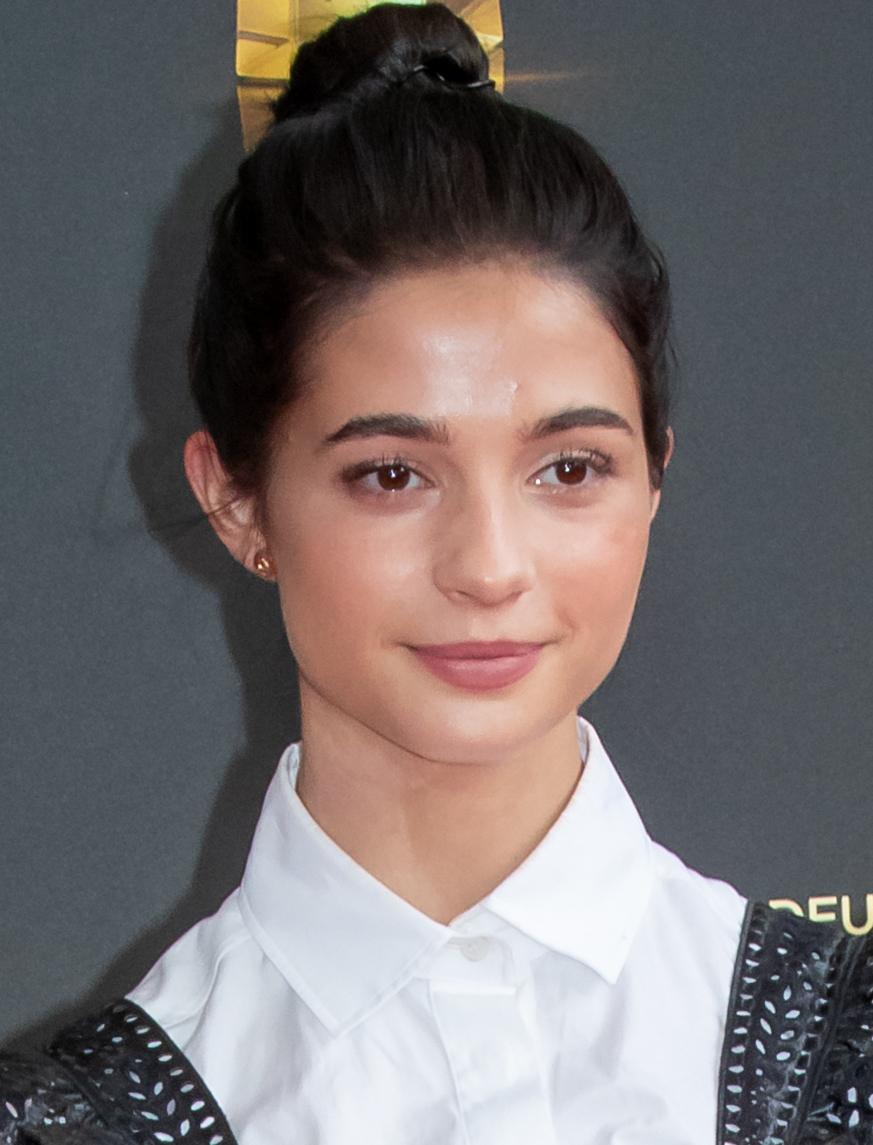
- Koroll in 2021
- Born: Lisa-Marie Werner; 26 December 1997 (age 28); Eisenach, Germany
- Occupations: Actress; model; singer; writer
- Years active: 2005–present
- Known for: Bibi & Tina
- Awards: Bunte New Faces Award

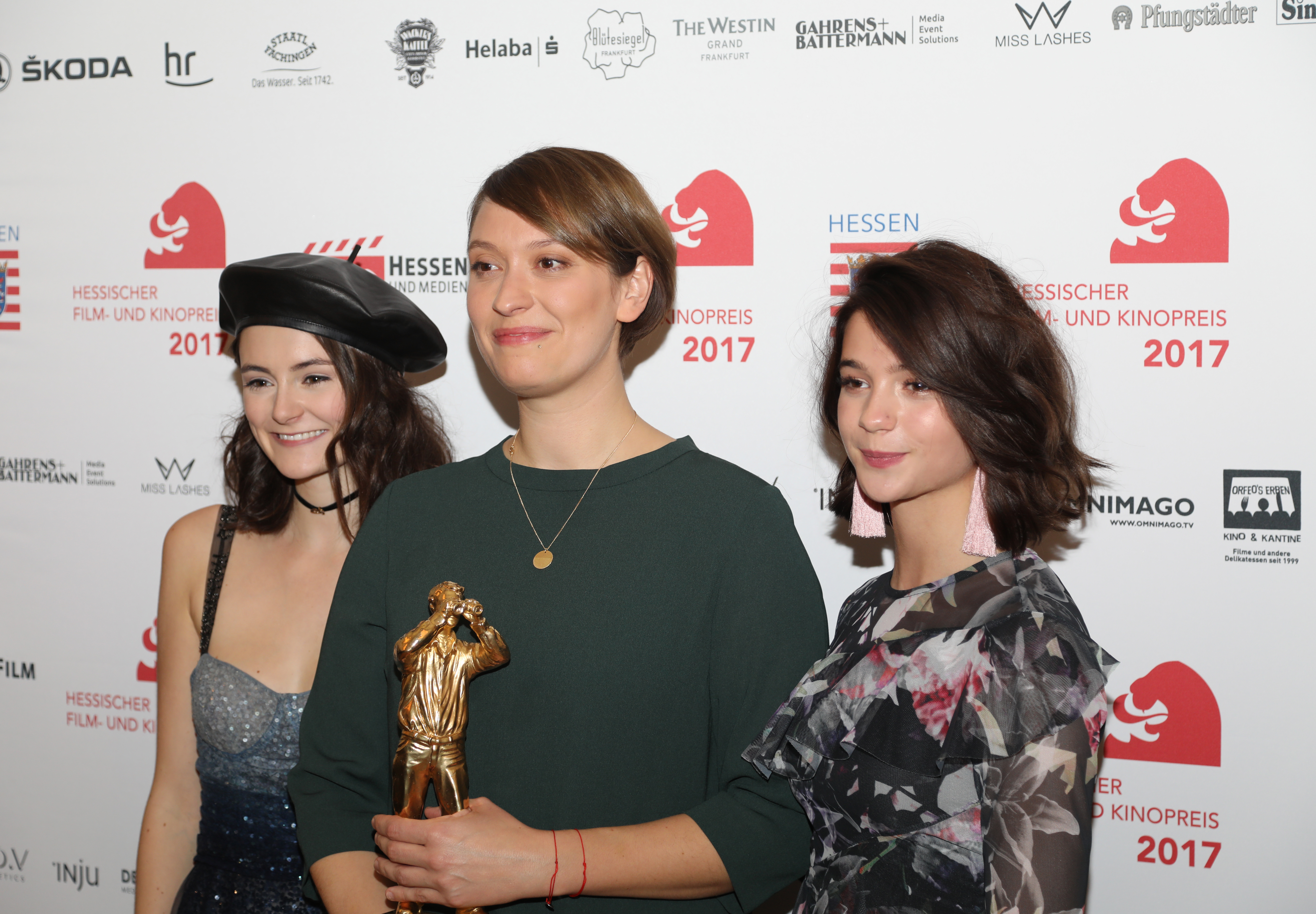
L to R: Lea van Acken, Teresa Hoerl & Lisa Marie Koroll (Hessischer Filmpreis 2017)

Lisa Marie Koroll (born 26 December 1997 in Eisenach, Germany) is a German actress and an author who popularly known for the role of "Tina Martin" in Bibi and Tina film series since 2014.

== Career ==
Lisa-Marie Koroll made her debut in 2005 as a child actress in the television series Familie Dr. Kleist, in which she was seen in the role of Clara Hofer from the second to the ninth and final seasons. In the summer of 2013 she was taken into the title role of Tina Martin in the cinema adaptations of the radio play series Bibi and Tina. She appeared in her first film in the role of Tina Martin in Bibi & Tina. It was directed by Detlev Buck and released on March 6, 2014.

She continuously played the role of Tina in all three films in the series. Koroll attended the Albert-Schweitzer-Gymnasium in Ruhla and passed her Abitur there in 2016. Koroll has not limited herself to acting, she is also an author. Her first book, (German: Lass Konfetti für dich regnen: Sei glücklich, nicht perfekt) was published in 2017.

In 2019 she was taken into a leading role in the RTL Zwei television series We are now and film Misfit and Abikalypse. In 2015 she was awarded the "Bunte New Faces Award" for the role in Bibi and Tina.

== Filmography ==
=== TV shows ===
Year	Title	Role	Ref.
2005–2019	Familie Dr. Kleist		
2017	In aller Freundschaft	Cora Gottschalk	
2018	Im Tal der wilden Rosen	Nike	
2019	Notruf Hafenkante	Alicia	
2019	Aus Haut und Knochen	Lara	
2006-2019	Circle of Life	Clara Kleist / Clara Hofer	
2019-2021	Wir sind jetzt	Laura	
2022	Ze Network	Melli Spitz	Main cast, 8 epis.

=== Films ===
Year	Title	Role	Ref.
2014	Bibi & Tina	Tina Martin	
2014	Bibi & Tina: Bewildered and Bewitched	Tina Martin	
2016	Bibi & Tina: Girls vs. Boys	Tina Martin	
2017	Bibi & Tina: Perfect Pandemonium	Tina Martin	
2018	Haunted Hospital	Emma	
2019	Misfit	Zelda	
2019	Abikalypse	Leonie	
2020	Takeover	Gia	
2020	Below Sweden	Chiara	
2020	It's for Your Own Good	Luna	
2022	The Kids Turned Out Fine	Chloé	
2023	Paradise	Marie Theissen	
2026	Drive - The Pretenders	Sarah Jenkins	

=== Short videos ===
Year	Title	Role	Ref.
2018	Lina - Egoist	Lisa-Marie	

== Awards ==
Year	Awards Ceremony	Category	Recommended Creation	Results
2015	Bunte New Faces Award	Special Award	Bibi & Tina	Won
