= Breaking Horizons =

- Film poster
- German: Am Himmel der Tag
- Directed by: Pola Schirin Beck
- Starring: Aylin Tezel; Henrike von Kuick
- Release date: 29 November 2012
- Running time: 90 minutes
- Country: Germany
- Language: German

Breaking Horizons (German: Am Himmel der Tag) is a 2012 German drama film directed by Pola Schirin Beck.

== Cast ==
- Aylin Tezel as Lara
- Henrike von Kuick as Nora
- Tómas Lemarquis as Elvar
- Godehard Giese as Martin
