= Next Door (2021 film) =

2021 comedy film

- Theatrical release poster
- Directed by: Daniel Brühl
- Written by: Daniel Kehlmann
- Produced by: Daniel Brühl; Malte Grunert
- Starring: Daniel Brühl; Peter Kurth
- Cinematography: Jens Harant
- Edited by: Marty Schenk
- Music by: Moritz Friedrich; Jakob Grunert
- Production companies: Amusement Park Films; Erfttal Film; Gretchenfilm; Warner Bros. Film Productions Germany
- Distributed by: Warner Bros. Pictures
- Release date: March 1, 2021 (Berlinale)
- Running time: 92 minutes
- Countries: Germany; United States
- Languages: German; English; Spanish

Next Door (German: Nebenan) is a German dark comedy-drama film directed by Daniel Brühl and written by Daniel Kehlmann. The film stars Daniel Brühl and Peter Kurth.

The film had its worldwide premiere at the 71st Berlin International Film Festival in March 2021.

== Cast ==
- Daniel Brühl as Daniel Weltz
- Peter Kurth as Bruno
- Rike Eckermann as Hilde
- Aenne Schwarz as Clara
- Gode Benedix as Micha
- Vicky Krieps as Actress
- Mex Schlüpfer as Guido
- Stefan Scheumann as Dirk
- Nils Doergelo as Nils

== Release ==
On February 11, 2021, Berlinale announced that the film would have its worldwide premiere at the 71st Berlin International Film Festival in the Berlinale Competition section, in March 2021.

== Reception ==
On the review aggregator website Rotten Tomatoes, 70% of 23 critics' reviews are positive. Metacritic, which uses a weighted average, assigned the film a score of 51 out of 100, based on 10 critics, indicating "mixed or average" reviews.
