= Weekend Rebels =

- Theatrical release poster
- Directed by: Marc Rothemund
- Screenplay by: Richard Kropf
- Based on: Wir Wochenendrebellen by Mirco Juterczenka and Jason von Juterczenka
- Produced by: Quirin Berg; Mara Fiedler; Justyna Müsch; Max Wiedemann
- Starring: Florian David Fitz; Aylin Tezel; Cecilio Andresen
- Cinematography: Philip Peschlow
- Edited by: Hans Horn; Chris Mühlbauer
- Music by: Hans Hafner; Johnny Klimek
- Production companies: Wiedemann & Berg Filmproduktion; Leonine Studios; SevenPictures Film
- Distributed by: Leonine Distribution
- Release date: 28 September 2023
- Running time: 109 minutes
- Country: Germany
- Languages: German; Albanian; Latvian; English
- Box office: $8,1 million

Weekend Rebels (German: Wochenendrebellen) is a 2023 German sports comedy-drama film directed by Marc Rothemund and written by Richard Kropf. Starring Florian David Fitz, Aylin Tezel and Cecilio Andresen. It is based on the autobiographical book Wir Wochenendrebellen by Mirco and Jason von Juterczenka. It is about the journey of a father and his autistic son to find the latter's favorite soccer team by visiting all 56 teams in their respective stadiums. It premiered on September 28, 2023, in German theaters.

== Synopsis ==
Mirco travels a lot for work, while his wife Fatime organizes the demanding family life. Their ten-year-old son Jason is autistic, and his everyday life consists of daily routines and set rules. When Jason's family is suggested to attend a special school, Mirco is also challenged as a parent. He makes a pact with his son: Jason promises to do his best not to be provoked at school if Mirco helps him find his favorite soccer club. However, Jason only wants to decide on a club once he has seen the 56 first, second, and third division teams live in their respective stadiums.

== Cast ==
The actors participating in this film are:

- Florian David Fitz as Mirco
- Aylin Tezel as Fatime
- Cecilio Andresen as Jason
- Florina Siegel as Lucy
- Joachim Król as Grandpa Gerd
- Petra-Maria Cammin as Ömchen (Manuela)
- Milena Dreißig as Miss Dr. Folke
- Leslie Malton as Mrs. Brinkhaus
- Tilo Nest as Professor Reinhard Sieben
- Michaela Wiebusch as Teacher Schönwalder
- Ilknur Boyraz as Rector Bussart
- Janina Kranz as Jessi
- Andreas Leopold Schadt as Folder Steve
- Elizabeth Heckel as Secretary
- Nela Bartsch as Elderly lady
- Markus Hoffmann as Folder
- Sabine Barth as Passenger
- Fritz Scheuermann as Bayern Fan
- Christo Klahr as Soccer Fan
- Frank Streffing

== Production ==
Principal photography finished at the end of November 2021 in Germany.

== Remake ==
An upcoming American remake will be directed by Stephen Chbosky.
