= Hansjörg Weißbrich =

German film editor (born 1967)

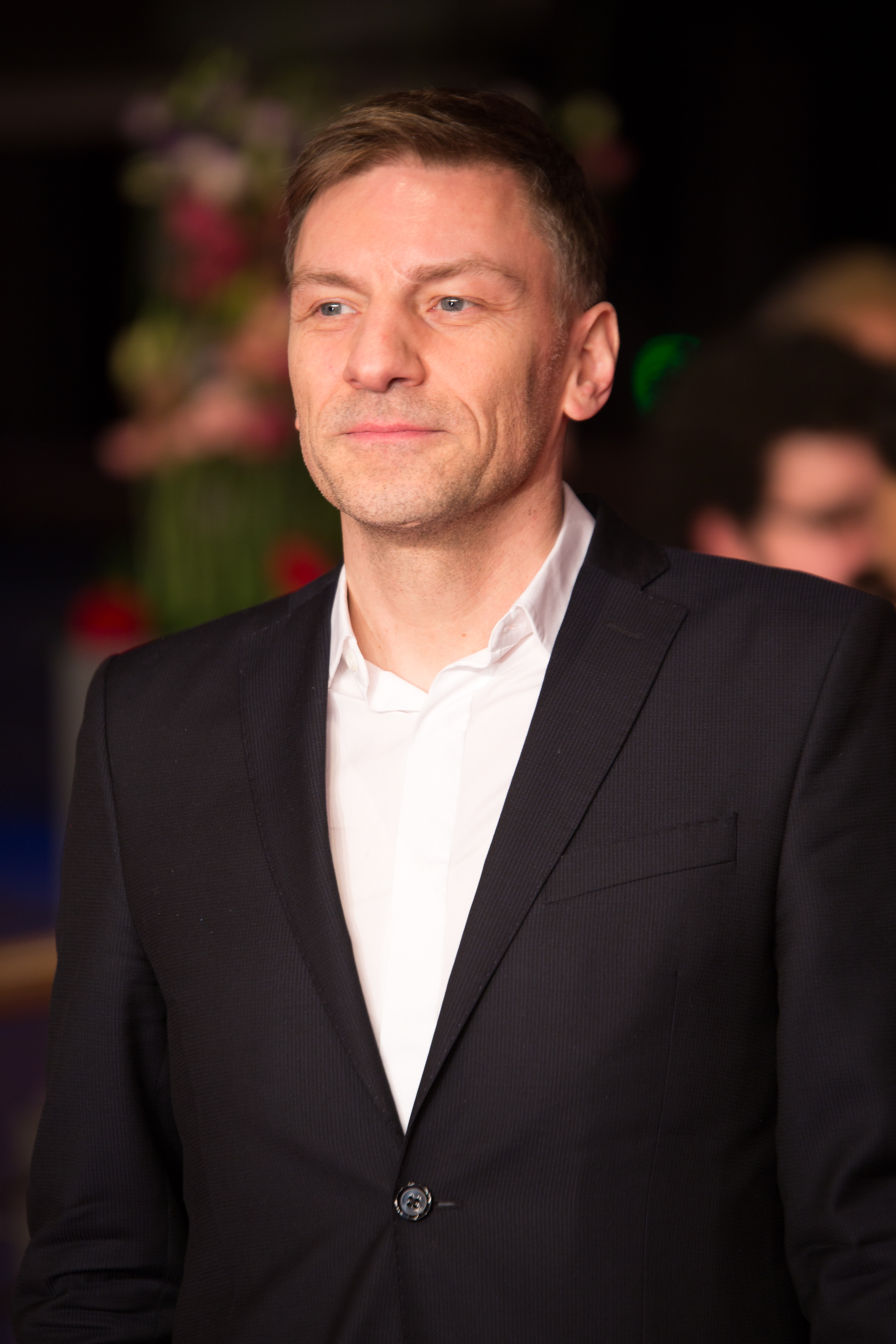
- Hansjörg Weißbrich at the Berlinale 2018
- Born: 6 February 1967 (age 59); Siegen, West Germany
- Occupation: Film editor
- Years active: 1995–present

Hansjörg Weißbrich (born 6 February 1967) is a German film editor. He contributed to more than sixty films since 1995 including Colonia, Trade and Night Train to Lisbon.

In 2025, he edited Late Shift (Heldin), a Switzerland/Germany co-production film selected at the 75th Berlin International Film Festival in Berlinale Special Gala section, which had its world premiere in February 2025 and was later released on 27 February 2025 in Swiss theaters.
