= Ferdinand von Schirach =

German lawyer and writer (born 1964)

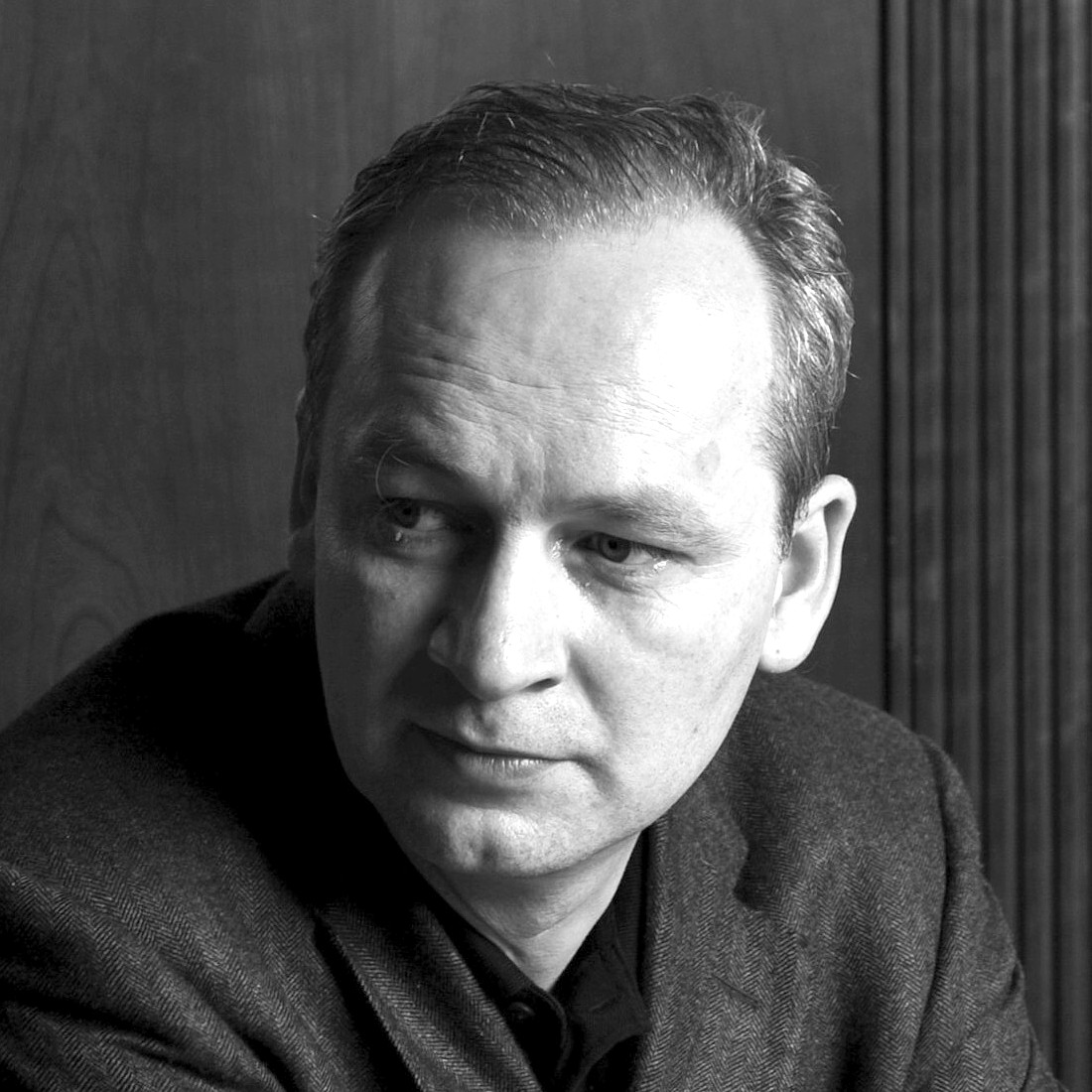
- Von Schirach in 2009
- Born: 12 May 1964 (age 62); Munich, West Germany
- Occupations: Lawyer, writer
- Website: www.schirach.de

Ferdinand Benedikt von Schirach (born 12 May 1964) is a German lawyer and writer. He published his first short stories at the age of forty-five. Shortly thereafter he became one of Germany's most successful authors. His books, which have been translated into more than 35 languages, have sold millions of copies worldwide and have made him "an internationally celebrated star of German literature."

== Life and work ==
Schirach was born in Munich. A member of the noble Sorbian (West Slavic) Schirach family, he is the son of Munich businessman Robert Benedict Wolf von Schirach (1938–1980) and his wife Elke (née Fähndrich, born 1942/1943, married 1962, divorced 1970). His father's parents were National Socialist youth leader Baldur von Schirach, and Henriette von Schirach née Hoffmann . His American great-grandmother was a descendant of Henry Middleton and John Parker. His mother Elke was the daughter of Ernst Fähndrich (died April 1945), who had worked for Heinrich Himmler, and Gretl Wieshofer-Kiehn, from her first marriage. Gretl was daughter of Fritz Kiehn (1885–1980), a former member of the Reichstag and owner of Efka-Werke.

He grew up in Munich and Trossingen and was educated at the Jesuit college Kolleg St. Blasien, about which he wrote in connection with sexual harassment in the Catholic Church in Der Spiegel. After studies in Bonn and his Referendariat in Aachen and in Berlin he became an attorney in 1994, specialised in criminal law. Von Schirach is considered a prominent attorney and represented, among others, the BND spy Norbert Juretzko, and, in the so-called "Politbüro trial", Günter Schabowski. He attracted attention in connection with the "Liechtenstein Tax Affair", in which charges were brought against the German Federal Intelligence Service Bundesnachrichtendienst and when he complained to the Berlin data protection agency on behalf of the family of actor Klaus Kinski, when it allowed the publication of Kinski's medical file. Schirach is active exclusively in the domain of criminal law.

In August 2009, Schirach published the book Verbrechen ("Crime") with the publisher Piper Verlag. The book remained on Der Spiegel's bestseller list for 54 weeks. The collection of stories is based on cases from his chambers. Rights to the book were sold in more than 30 countries.

In August 2010, his second book, Schuld ("Guilt") appeared, again with Piper Verlag, and again it contains short stories drawing on von Schirach's everyday experience as an attorney.

In September 2011, Piper Verlag published Schirach's third book, Der Fall Collini ("The Collini Case"), which reached no. 2 on the bestseller list of Der Spiegel. The book features a character based on Schirach's grandfather. It tells of the murder of the industrialist Hans Meyer, who had been a Nazi officer in Italy. It deals, controversially, with the sometimes excessively mild ways in which the post-World War II justice system in Germany dealt with former Nazis. It was adapted into a film in 2019.

He has since published another collection of three short stories Carl Tohrbergs Weihnachten ("Carl Tohrberg's Christmas"), a second Novel Tabu ("The Girl Who Wasn't There"), a collection of the essays he wrote for Der Spiegel titled Die Würde ist antastbar ("Dignity is violable", alluding to the first sentence of the German Constitution) and the theater play Terror. The play stages the court trial of an air force pilot accused of mass murder after having shot down a hijacked civil plane which was intended to crash into a soccer stadium. The audience gets to act as a jury and votes on the verdict on which the sentence at the end of the play is then based.

In 2018, he published another collection of twelve short stories, titled Strafe (Punishment). As explained in an interview with Deutschlandfunk Kultur, Strafe completes the trilogy he began with Verbrechen and Schuld; he had always planned it to take this form. Each of the volumes corresponds to the examination order of an indictment in a criminal court of law.

== Selected works ==
- „Kaffee und Zigaretten“, 2019
- „Trotzdem“, 2020
- „Jeder Mensch“, 2021
- „Nachmittage“, 2022
- „Der stille Freund“, 2025

=== Theater ===
- Terror, 2015
- Gott, 2020

=== Children's books ===
- Alexander, 2026

=== Film adaptations ===
- Glück, 2012
- Verbrechen, 2013
- Schuld, 2014–2019
- The Verdict, 2016
- Der weiße Äthiopier, 2016
- Asphaltgorillas, 2018
- The Collini Case, 2019
- Gott, 2020
- Feinde, 2021
- Glauben, 2021
