= Marco Kreuzpaintner =

German filmmaker (born 1977)

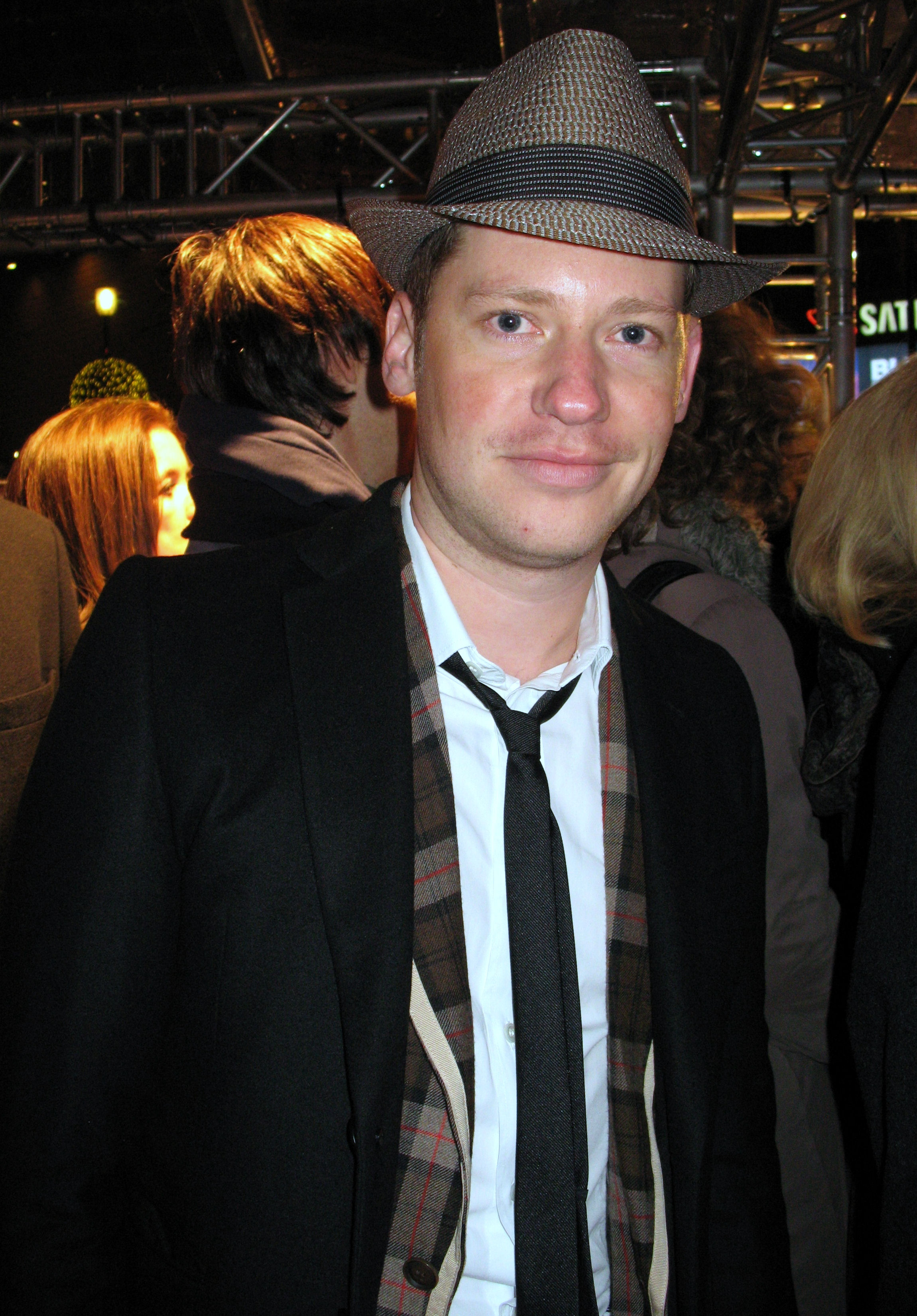
- Kreuzpaintner in 2009
- Born: 11 March 1977 (age 49); Rosenheim, West Germany
- Occupations: Film director; Screenwriter; Executive producer
- Years active: 1999–present
- Notable work: Bodies; Those About to Die; Summer Storm; Krabat; Beat; The Lazarus Project

Marco Johann Kreuzpaintner (born 11 March 1977) is a German film director, screenwriter, showrunner and executive producer. He is known for his gay coming-of-age feature film Summer Storm, the critical acclaimed Netflix series Bodies, the British Academy of Film and Television Arts winning series The Lazarus Project and his Amazon Prime series Beat which won him Germany's prestigious Grimme Preis. His fantasy film Krabat starring Daniel Brühl and David Kross and the screen adaptation of the Ferdinand von Schirach novel The Collini Case starring Elyas M'Barek, Alexandra Maria Lara and Franco Nero were box office hits in their original territory Germany. Kreuzpaintner's U.S. feature film Trade, starring Kevin Kline, is a story about human trafficking. It was the first film to premiere at the United Nations on invitation of former U.N. secretary-general Ban Ki-moon. The film played a key to finally passing a law against sex trafficking role in the state of New York.

== Career ==
In 1999, he began his career in the role of German dubbing assistant for the Stanley Kubrick film Eyes Wide Shut.

In the same year, his first short film, Entering Reality, starring August Diehl attracted attention at film festivals. In 1999, he founded the production company Die Filmmanufaktur with Oliver Weiss. In 2000, he made the short film Der Atemkünstler, for which he was nominated for the Talent award First Steps, and in 2002, he made a TV pilot, Rec – Kassettenmädchen/Kassettenjungs.

In 2003, his first feature-length film, Ganz und gar, which describes the life of a young leg amputee, was released in theaters.

This was followed in 2004 with the drama Summer Storm, which, according to Kreuzpaintner, resembles his own coming out as a young gay man. Summer Storm won the German Film Award for Best Young Director and earned him a nomination for Best Director and Best Screenplay. The film's lead was also nominated for Best Actor. Distributed by Warner Bros., the film was an official selection at over 50 film festivals worldwide, including Toronto, Berlin, London, and Palm Springs.

In 2006, he wrote the screenplay for the film version of the youth novel Die Wolke.

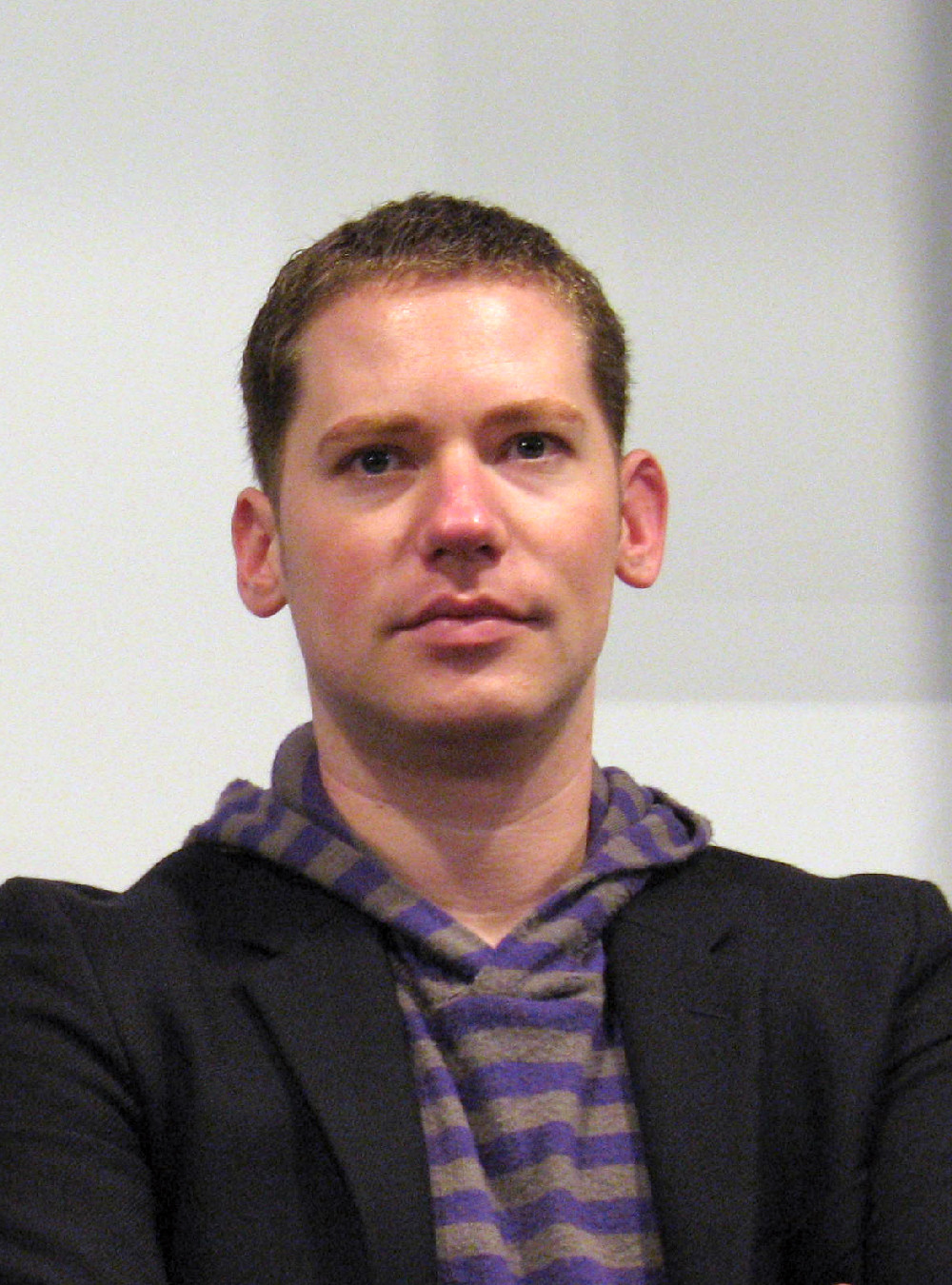
Kreuzpaintner at the German premiere of Trade in 2007

In 2007, Trade was released internationally. The film focuses on the subject of human trafficking, forced prostitution, and modern slavery. Trade was produced by Rosilyn Heller and was originally supposed to be directed by Roland Emmerich. However, as he was involved in preparation for directing 10,000 BC at the time, another director was sought, and Emmerich chose Kreuzpaintner, having met him previously in Munich in 2003. Trade was the first film to have its world premiere at the United Nations Headquarters in New York City. The premiere was hosted by Sigourney Weaver, with former Secretary-General of the United Nations Ban Ki-moon opening the event.

On 9 October 2008 Krabat, an adaptation of the youth novel of the same name by Otfried Preußler was released, starring Robert Stadlober, Daniel Brühl and David Kross. Krabat had a successful release both in Germany and international markets, breaking the domestic record in 2008 for German language film. Looking to expand into other areas of the filmmaking business, 2009 saw Kreuzpaintner co-found the production company Summerstorm Entertainment in Berlin, with producers Ossie von Richthofen and Fabian Wolfart. Summerstorm Entertainment continues to develop and produce English and German language films, it became a subsidiary of multi-faceted media company Film House Germany in 2011.

Following a break of a few years after the release of Krabat. Kreuzpaintner developed a screenplay originally set for an English language release. However, Kreuzpaintner eventually reworked the script into a German language romantic comedy, Coming In. Following Coming In, Kreuzpaintner found critical success and record ratings with TV movies distributed through German television network, ARD. During this time, he began the development of an original thriller.

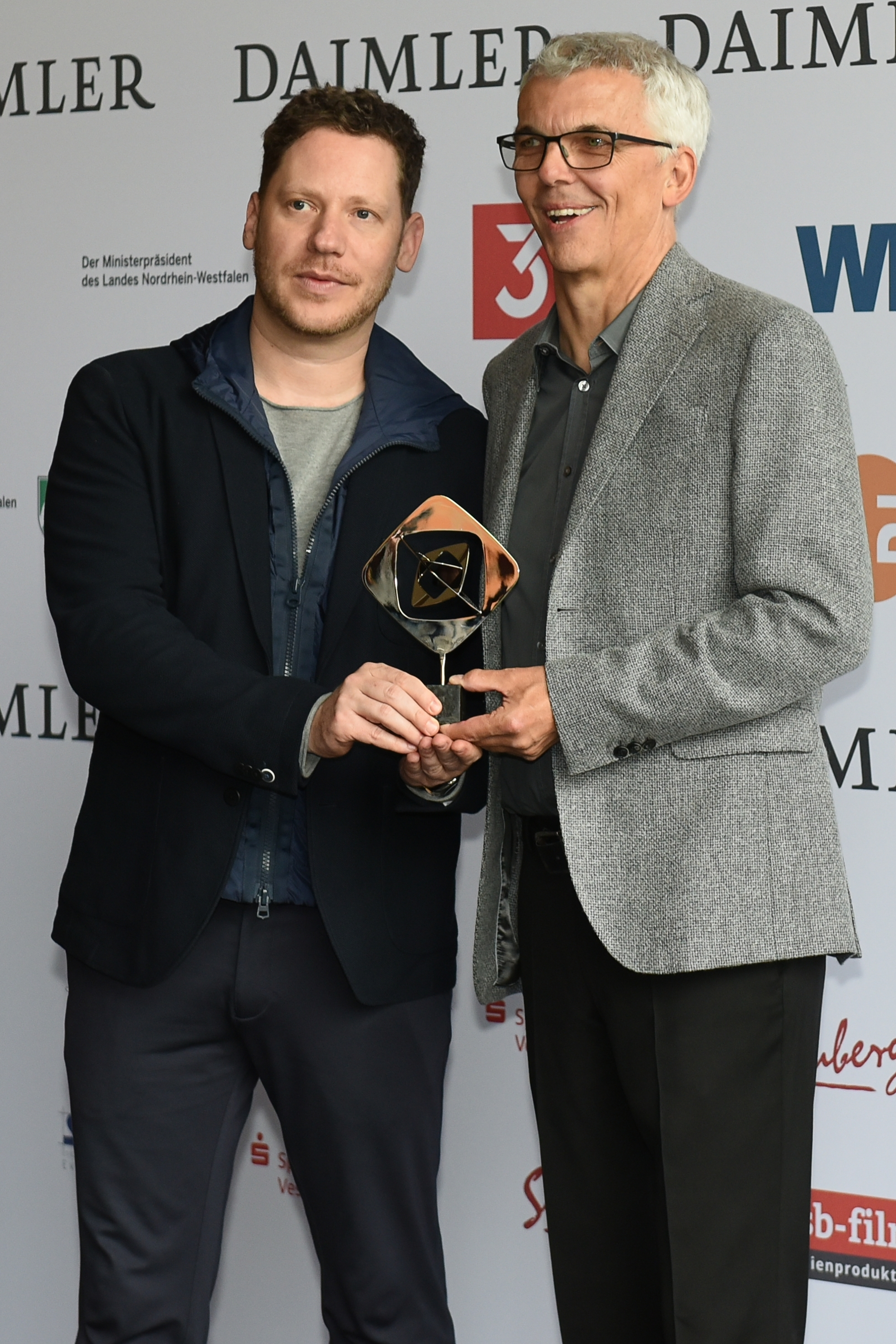
Kreuzpaintner (left) with Beat writer Norbert Eberlein

In 2018, Amazon Prime Video commissioned, Beat, a German thriller television show created and directed by Kreuzpaintner. It starred Jannis Niewöhner as the titular character. It was released on 9 November 2018.

Following the release of Beat, Kreuzpaintner moved back to feature filmmaking. In 2019, Kreuzpaintner directed The Collini Case, a film about a young lawyer who stumbles upon a vast conspiracy while investigating a brutal murder case. The film stars Franco Nero, Elyas M'Barek, Heiner Lauterbach, Alexandra Maria Lara and Rainer Bock. Returning to television in 2020, Kreuzpaintner directed two episodes ("Little Adventures" and "Layover") of the show Soulmates, a show created by William Bridges and Brett Goldstein. It was released on 5 October 2020 through Amazon Studios. In 2021, Kreuzpaintner joined The Lazarus Project, a project produced through Urban Myth Films and written by Joe Barton. Paapa Essiedu stars as George in the lead role, a character who is forced to choose between the love of his life and the fate of the world. Kreuzpaintner directed the first four episodes and was an executive producer for the series. The show was released on 16 June 2022 through Sky Max and Now. The series was awarded with a BAFTA Cymru for Best TV Drama in 2023.

In 2022, an adaptation of Si Spencer's graphic novel, Bodies began production. The eight part series is produced with Netflix through Moonage Pictures, with Susie Liggat as series producer and Kreuzpaintner directing the first four episodes. Bodies reached number 1 on the global Netflix charts for several weeks.

In 2023, Kreuzpaintner directed 5 out of 10 episodes of the TV series Those About to Die alongside his friend Roland Emmerich. The series was shot at the Cinecittà film studios in Rome starring Anthony Hopkins amongst an international ensemble cast.

== Filmography ==
=== Film ===
Year	Title	Distributor	Additional roles
1999	Entering Reality (short film)	Kreuzpaintner & Siebert Filmproduktion GbR	Concept and Producer
2000	Minorities (short film)	Hager Moss	
2000	Der Atemkünstler (short film)	Die Filmmanufaktur, Edgar Reitz Film, BR	
2001	REC – Kassettenjungs/Kassettenmädchen	ZDF	
2003	Ganz und gar	Constantin Film	
2004	Summer Storm	X Verleih AG	Co-wrote with Thomas Bahmann
2007	Trade	Roadside Attractions, Lionsgate (US), 20th Century Fox (DE)	
2008	Krabat	20th Century Fox	Co-wrote with Michael Gutmann
2014	Coming In	Warner Bros. Entertainment Inc.	Co-wrote with Jane Ainscough
2015	Country Love	Warner Bros. Entertainment Inc.	
2016	Stadtlandliebe	Warner Bros. Entertainment Inc.	
2019	The Collini Case	Constantin Film	

=== Television ===
Year	Title	Distributor	Additional Roles
2015	Your Children	ARD	TV movie
2016	Police Call 110 - And Forgive Us Our Debt	ARD	TV movie
2018	Beat	Amazon Studios	Creator, Director, Writer
2020	Soulmates	AMC	Director: Episodes 3 & 4
2022	The Lazarus Project	Sky Max	Director: Episodes 1-4, Executive producer
2023	Bodies	Netflix	Director: Episodes 1-4, Executive producer
2024	Those About to Die	Peacock	Director: 5 Episodes, Executive producer

=== Screenplay ===
Year	Title	Distributor
2006	Die Wolke	Concorde Filmverleih

== Awards ==
Year	Institution	Category	Nominated work	Result
2001	German Film Academy	First Step Award	Der Atemkünstler Nebensächlichkeiten	Nominated
2003	Max Ophüls Prize	Best Film	Ganz und Gar	Nominated
2004	Munich Film Festival	Audience Award	Summer Storm	Won
2005	New Faces	Best Young Director	Summer Storm	Won
2005	Milan International Lesbian and Gay Film Festival	Audience Award	Summer Storm	Won
2007	Munich Film Festival	Best Director	Himself	Won
2007	Munich Film Festival	Bernard Wicki Film Award	Trade	Won
2007	Hessian Film and Cinema Prize	Special Award - Shared with Roland Emmerich	Trade	Won
2007	Cinema for Peace	Special Award	Trade	Won
2008	Bavarian Film Award	Best Children's and Youth Film	Krabat	Won
2016	FilmOut Audience Awards	Best International Feature	Coming In	Won
2017	Grimme Institut	Grimme-Preis	Police Call 110 - And forgive Us Our Guilt	Nominated
2018	Studio Hamburg	Best Director	Your Children	Nominated
2019	Funke Mediengruppe	Goldene Kamera - Best Miniseries	Beat	Nominated
2019	Grimme Institut	Grimme-Preis	Beat	Won
2020	Bavarian Film Award	Best Film	The Collini Case	Nominated
2020	Norwegian International Film Festival	Best Film	The Collini Case	Won
2020	Berlin & Beyond Film Festival	Best Narrative Feature	The Collini Case	Won
2020	Cinema for Peace	Award for Justice	The Collini Case	Won
2020	Silicon Valley Jewish Film Festival	Best Feature	The Collini Case	Won
2023	BAFTA Cymru	Best Drama	The Lazarus Project	Won
