= Kostja Ullmann =

German actor (born 1984)

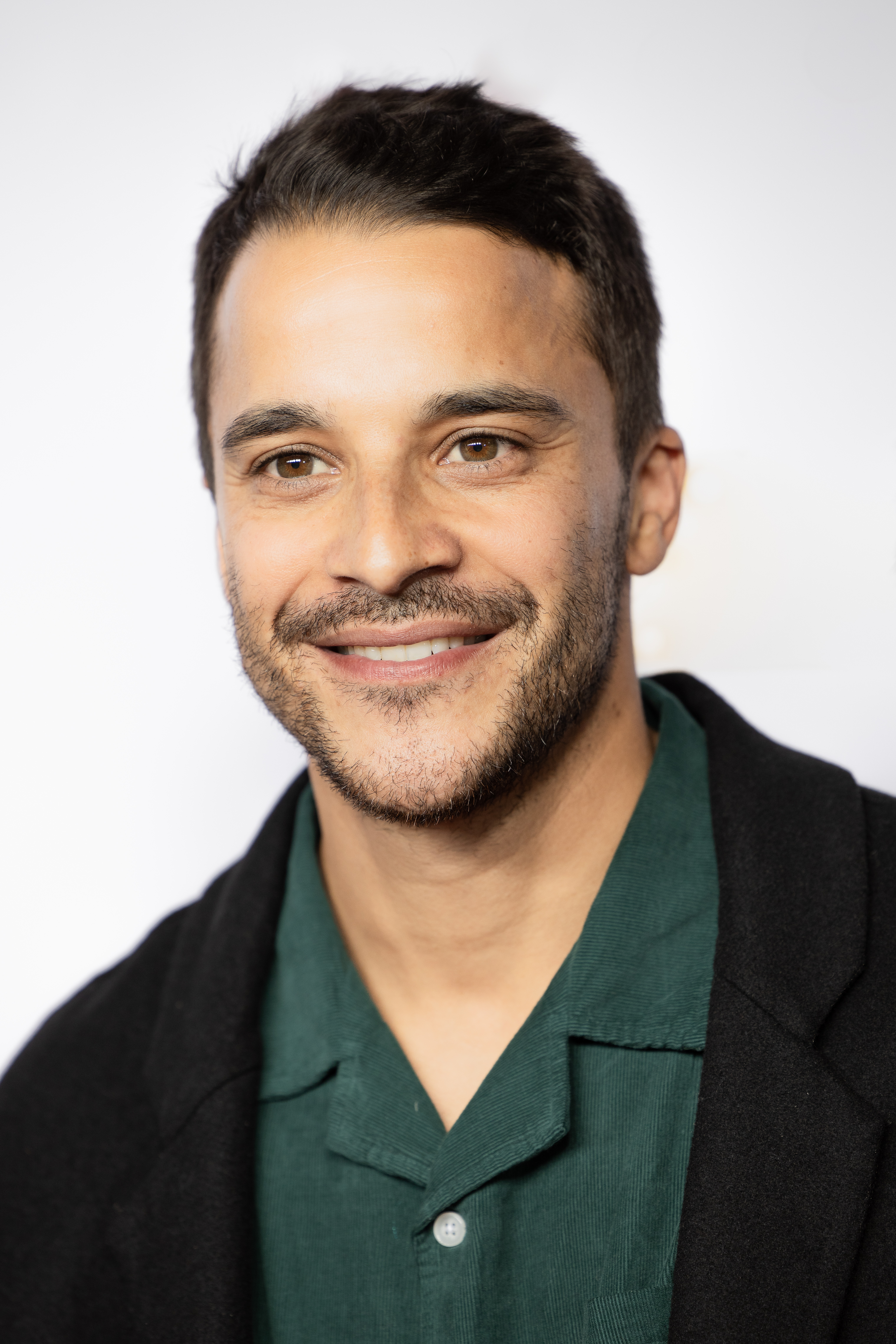
- Ullmann in 2020
- Born: Kostja Alexander Ullmann; 30 May 1984 (age 42); Hamburg, West Germany
- Occupation: Actor
- Years active: 1998–present

Kostja Ullmann (born 30 May 1984) is a German actor, best known for his leading role in the award-winning coming of age drama Sommersturm (Summer Storm) which gained a lot of praise throughout Europe.

== Life and career ==
Ullmann was born in Hamburg to a German father and an Indian mother. He entered the stage at the age of eleven and performed at Hamburg's Ernst Deutsch Theater and Winterhuder Fährhaus. In 1998, he made his TV debut in a minor part in the crime series Alphateam.

In the following years, Ullmann starred in several minor roles in TV series such as Stahlnetz, Großstadtrevier, and Leipzig Homicide as well as in TV movies such as the drama Albtraum einer Ehe (2001) alongside August Zirner. From 1999 to 2000, he was a cast member of the comedy series Zwei Männer am Herd with Wolfgang Fierek and Florian Fitz.

In 2004, Kostja Ullmann made his movie debut in a leading role in Marco Kreuzpaintner's award-winning film Sommersturm (Summer Storm). His performance in the romantic TV drama Heimliche Liebe (Secret Love) about the relationship of a schoolboy and an older woman won Ullmann the Günther-Strack-Fernsehpreis as Best Actor in 2006.

In his second movie, Hounded (2006), Ullmann stars in a similar role. Directed by Angelina Maccarone, he plays a young delinquent who engages in an "amour fou" with his probation officer who is more than 30 years older than he is. The film won a Golden Leopard at the 2006 Locarno International Film Festival. He acted as Hermann Lake in German-Japan collaborated movie Baruto no Gakuen (Ode an die Freude) in 2006.

Ullmann played the lead role, Luca Behrendt, in the 2008 movie Die Zeit, die man Leben nennt.

Ullmann will voice Wirt in the German dub of Over the Garden Wall.

== Filmography ==
Films
Year	Title	Role
1998	König auf Mallorca (King of Mallorca)	
2001	Albtraum einer Ehe (A Marriage Turned Nightmare)	Michael Schiffer
2002	Familie XXL (Family XXL)	Timo Kramer
2004	Mein Weg zu dir heißt Liebe (My Path to You is Called Love)	Alexander Niebauer
2004	Summer Storm	Achim
2004	The School Trip (The School Trip)	Tobi
2005/III	Game Over (Short)	Nick
2005	Secret Love: The Schoolboy and the Mailwoman	Joe Reinhardt
2005	Franziska Spiegel – Eine Erinnerung (Short) (Franziska Spiegel – A Memory)	Stefanies Freund
2006	Baruto no Gakuen (The Baltic Academy)	Hermann Lake
2006	Verliebt, na und wie! (In Love, and How!)	Partygast
2006	Hounded (Hounded)	Jan Winkler
2007	The Hunt for Troy (The Hunt for Troy)	Demetrios
2007	Special Escort (Special Escort)	Lasse
2008	Die Zeit, die man Leben nennt (The Time Called Life)	Luca
2008	The Miracle of Berlin (The Miracle of Berlin)	Marco Kaiser
2008	Waiting for Angelina (Waiting for Angelina)	Momme Ulmer
2008	Das tapfere Schneiderlein (The Brave Little Tailor)	Schneider David
2009	The Wild Chicks and Life (The Wild Chicks and Life)	Max Fischer
2009	Der verlorene Sohn (The Prodigal Son)	Rainer Schröder
2010	Single by Contract	Chriz
2010	Amigo (Amigo – Death Upon Arrival)	Rio Bosch
2011	My Own Flesh and Blood (My Own Flesh and Blood)	Oliver
2012	Die Tote ohne Alibi (The Dead Woman Without an Alibi)	Tim Berners
2012	Schutzengel (Guardian Angel)	Kurt
2012	Heiraten ist auch keine Lösung (Getting Married Isn't the Answer, Either)	Luca
2013	Sources of Life	Junger Klaus
2013	Ruby Red	James
2013/VIII	The Key (Short)	
2013	Grossstadtklein (Big City, Small Town)	Ronny
2014	A Most Wanted Man	Rasheed
2014	Sapphire Blue	James
2014	Coming In	Tom
2015	3 Türken und ein Baby (3 Turks and a Baby)	Celal Yildiz
2016	Bibi & Tina: Girls vs. Boys (Bibi & Tina: Girls vs. Boys)	Leo Schmackes
2017	My Blind Date With Life	Saliya Kahawatte
2017	Lotta y la cara sería de la vida (Lotta and the Serious Side of Life)	
2018	Beat	Jasper
2020	Christmas Crossfire	Samuel
2023	Paradise	Max Toma
