= Tom Wlaschiha =

German actor

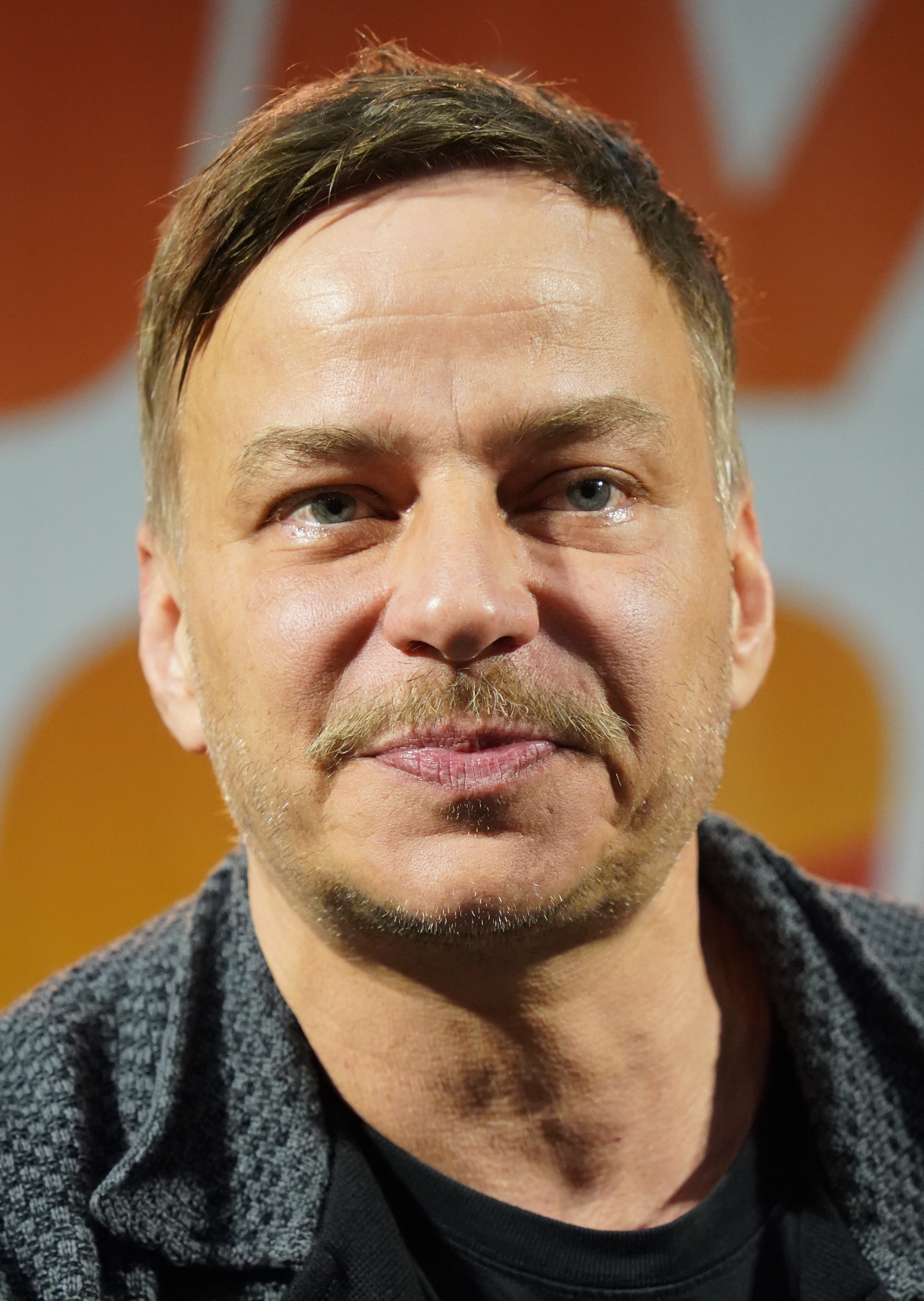
- Wlaschiha in 2023
- Born: Thomas Wlaschiha; 1973 (age 52–53); Dohna, Bezirk Dresden, East Germany
- Occupation: Actor
- Years active: 1995–present

Thomas Wlaschiha (born 1973) is a German actor. Internationally, he is known for his roles as Jaqen H'ghar in the second, fifth and sixth seasons of the TV series Game of Thrones, as well as Sebastian Berger in the police procedural Crossing Lines. He also appeared in four episodes of Jack Ryan as Max Schenkel. He plays Dmitri Antonov / "Enzo" in the fourth season of Stranger Things.

== Early life and education ==
Wlaschiha was born 20 June 1973 in Dohna, Bezirk Dresden, East Germany. At the age of 17, shortly after the fall of the Berlin Wall, he traveled to the United States as an exchange student, where he remained for a year studying English and performing in theater productions.

== Career ==
Since 1998 he has played mostly supporting roles in numerous German and international TV and film productions. In his first leading role he portrayed Stephan in the 2000 gay milieu study No One Sleeps.

On stage Wlaschiha has performed with the Theater Junge Generation (Young Generation) in Dresden from 1996 until 2000, with the Schauspielhaus Zürich in 2002, and with the Schauspiel Frankfurt in 2003.

In August 2011 he was cast as the convict and assassin Jaqen H'ghar in season 2 of the HBO fantasy TV series Game of Thrones, and reprised his role in seasons 5 and 6, starting in 2015. For his performance in Game of Thrones he was nominated for Outstanding Performance by an Ensemble in a Drama Series by the Screen Actors Guild Awards in 2016.

From 2013 to 2015 he starred in the crime series Crossing Lines as Kommissar Sebastian Berger, a German police officer.

Wlaschiha portrayed Gestapo inspector Hagan Forster in the 2018 television series Das Boot, and subsequently in the second and third series.

As a voice actor Wlaschiha is heard in film dubs, audiobooks, and commercials. For some of his international work (e.g., Game of Thrones), Wlaschiha dubs himself in German. He voiced Buzz Lightyear in the German dub of Lightyear.

== Personal life ==
Wlaschiha also speaks English, French, Italian, and Russian.

Baritone singer Ekkehard Wlaschiha was his uncle.

== Acting credits ==
=== Film ===
Year	Title	Role	Notes
1999	Ich wünsch Dir Liebe	Nachbar	Television film
2000	No One Sleeps	Stefan Hein	
2001	Enemy at the Gates	Soldier	
2001	Rent a Baby	Oliver	Television film
2002	Alibis for Sale	Stefan	Television film
2003	Fast perfekt verlobt	Nikas Kollege	Television film
2004	Pura vida Ibiza	Felix	
2004	Die Stunde der Offiziere	Hauptmann Axel von dem Bussche	Television film documentary
2004	Rock Crystal	Schafhirt Philipp	
2005	Icon	Mercedes Driver	Television film
2005	Munich	News Crew at Fürstenfeldbruck	
2006	16 Blocks	Bus Passenger	
2006	The Cloud	Hannes	
2007	My Little Boy	Wolfgang	Short film
2007	Fürchte dich nicht	Lt. Falk	Television film
2008	Ship of No Return: The Final Voyage of the Gustloff	Bootsmann	Television film
2008	Brideshead Revisited	Kurt	
2008	Krabat	Hanzo	
2008	Valkyrie	Communications Officer	
2011	Christopher and His Kind	Gerhardt Neddermayer	Television film
2011	Who's Watching Who	Thomas	Short film
2011	Stilles Tal	Olli Reschke	
2011	Anonymous	Captain of the Guard (uncredited)	
2011	Resistance	Albrecht	
2012	Freshly Squeezed	Chris	
2012	A Small Thing	Moritz Blank	Television film
2013	Ohne Gnade!	Baboo	
2013	Rush	Harald Ertl	
2014	Mr. Turner	Prince Albert	
2017	Eltern und andere Wahrheiten	Torsten Pfeffer	Television film
2017	Berlin Falling	Andreas	
2017	Dobermann	Siras	Short film
2018	I krig & kærlighed	Gerhard	
2019	Saturday Fiction	Saul Speyer	
2020	Rose Island	Wolfgang Rudy Neumann	
2022	Lightyear	Buzz Lightyear (voice)	German dub
2020	Escape to the Sea	Karl	Television film
2025	Yunan	Karl	Premiere at 75th Berlin International Film Festival.
2025	Damned If You Do, Damned If You Don't	Helmut	Premiere at 82nd Venice International Film Festival.

=== Television ===
Year	Title	Role	Notes
1995	Stubbe – Von Fall zu Fall	Koschi	Episode 1.1: "Stubbes Erbschaft"
1996	Max Wolkenstein	Kai	Episode 1.5: "Verbotene Liebe"
1997	Mama ist unmöglich	Rico	Episode 1.7: "Mama ahoi!"
1998	Der Fahnder	Dieter Feldberg	Episode 8.5: "Direkt ins Herz"
2000	Die Cleveren	Jochen	Episode 2.2: "Der Rosenkavalier"
2000	Tatort	Lars Kante	Episode: "Das letzte Rodeo"
2000–2004	Die Rettungsflieger	Feldwebel Torsten Biedenstedt	14 episodes
2003	Die Sitte	Bernd Horsten	Episode 1.2: "Auf gute Nachbarschaft"
2003	Unser Charly	Richy	Episode 8.2: "Charly sieht alles"
2003	Im Namen des Gesetzes	Tobias Ording	Episode 3.8: "Todesspiel"
2003	Küstenwache	Felix Kemper	Episode 6.12: "Entführung auf See"
2003	Hallo Robbie!	Horst	Episode 3.1: "In letzter Sekunde"
2004	Ein Fall für zwei		Episode 24.2: "Mord aus Liebe"
2004, 2007, 2012	In aller Freundschaft	Dr. Daniel Lohmann (season 7 & 9) / Julian Tessner (season 14; uncredited)	4 episodes
2006	Unter den Linden – Das Haus Gravenhorst	Hermann Pikeweit	13 episodes
2006	SOKO Wismar	Jens Holling	Episode 3.8: "Halbe Volte"
2006	Zwei Engel für Amor	Sebastian / Mann (uncredited)	3 episodes
2007	GSG 9 – Ihr Einsatz ist ihr Leben	Wetting	Episode 1.9: "Abgewiesen"
2007	Alarm für Cobra 11 – Die Autobahnpolizei	Nick Weiss	Episode 22.6: "Stunde der Wahrheit"
2008	Die Gustloff	Bootsmann	
2008	Spoons		
2008	Unschuldig	Endres	Episode 1.9: "Große Fische"
2008	Die Patin – Kein Weg zurück	Lew	
2009	Wilsberg	Stefan Wehnert	Episode 1.26: "Der Mann am Fenster"
2009	Eine für alle – Frauen können's besser	Sebastian Vollenbrinck	19 episodes
2009	Ihr Auftrag, Pater Castell	Thomas Welz	Episode 2.2: "Der Schatz des Kaufmanns"
2010	Der letzte Bulle	Markus Breckwoldt	Episode 1.2: "Überlebenstraining"
2010	The Deep	Arkady	4 episodes
2010	The Sarah Jane Adventures	Lt. Koenig	Episodes 4.9 and 4.10: "Lost in Time"
2011	Stuttgart Homicide	Benedikt Fahl	Episode 3.9: "Lavendeltod"
2012	Leipzig Homicide		Episode 11.12: "Junggesellinnenabschied"
2012; 2015–2016	Game of Thrones	Jaqen H'ghar	Recurring (season 2), main role (seasons 5–6); 17 episodes
2013–2015	Crossing Lines	Sebastian Berger	34 episodes
2013	Agatha Christie's Poirot	Schwartz	Episode 13.4: "The Labours of Hercules"
2014	Borgia	Philip of Habsburg	Episode 3.13: "1506"
2015	Tatort	Thorsten Rausch	Episode: "Borowski und die Kinder von Gaarden"
2017	Maigret	Carl Andersen	Episode 2.1: "Maigret's Night at the Crossroads"
2017	Schuld nach Ferdinand von Schirach	Kommissar Weinhauer	Episode 2.2: "Anatomie"
2017	Dengler	Marius Brauer	Episode 1.3: "Die schützende Hand"
2018	Das Boot	Hagen Forster	19 episodes
2019	Thanks for the Memories	Justin Beckmann	2 episodes
2019	Jack Ryan	Max Schenkel	4 episodes
2022	Stranger Things	Dmitri "Enzo" Antonov	Recurring (season 4); 8 episodes
2022	Last Light	Karl Bergmann	Recurring; 4 episodes
2022	Dangerous Liaisons	Henri de Montrachet	Recurring; 3 episodes
2023	Mrs. Davis	Hans Ziegler	Recurring; 5 episodes

=== Theatre ===
Year	Play	Role	Venue
1993	Saved	Fred	Schauspiel Leipzig
Year unknown	Volpore	Voltore	Schauspiel Leipzig
1999	Drei Schwestern	Tusenbach	tjg, Dresden
1999	Bluthochzeit	The Bridegroom	tjg, Dresden
2000	Faust ist tot	Donny	TiF, Dresden
2001	Tartuffe (Molière)	Valère	Mecklenburg State Theatre, Schwerin
2001	Engel der Tankstelle	Marshall	Volksbühne, Berlin
2003	Heinrich IV	Mortimer	Schauspielhaus Zürich
2003	Klinik	Markus	Schauspielhaus Zürich
2005	Maria Magdalena (Hebbel)	Secretary	Schauspiel Frankfurt
2006	231 East 47th Street	Andy Warhol	Sophiensæle, Berlin
2007	Das ist mein Bett (Franckh)	Phillip	Wechselbad, Dresden
2007	Der Freigeist (Schmitt)	Denis Diderot	Wechselbad, Dresden
2008	Frühling (Léhar)	Ewald	Volksbühne, Berlin
2009	Salome	Maraboth	Staatstheater Stuttgart
2025	The Land of the Living	Thomas	Royal National Theatre
