= Francis Fulton-Smith =

German-English actor (born 1966)

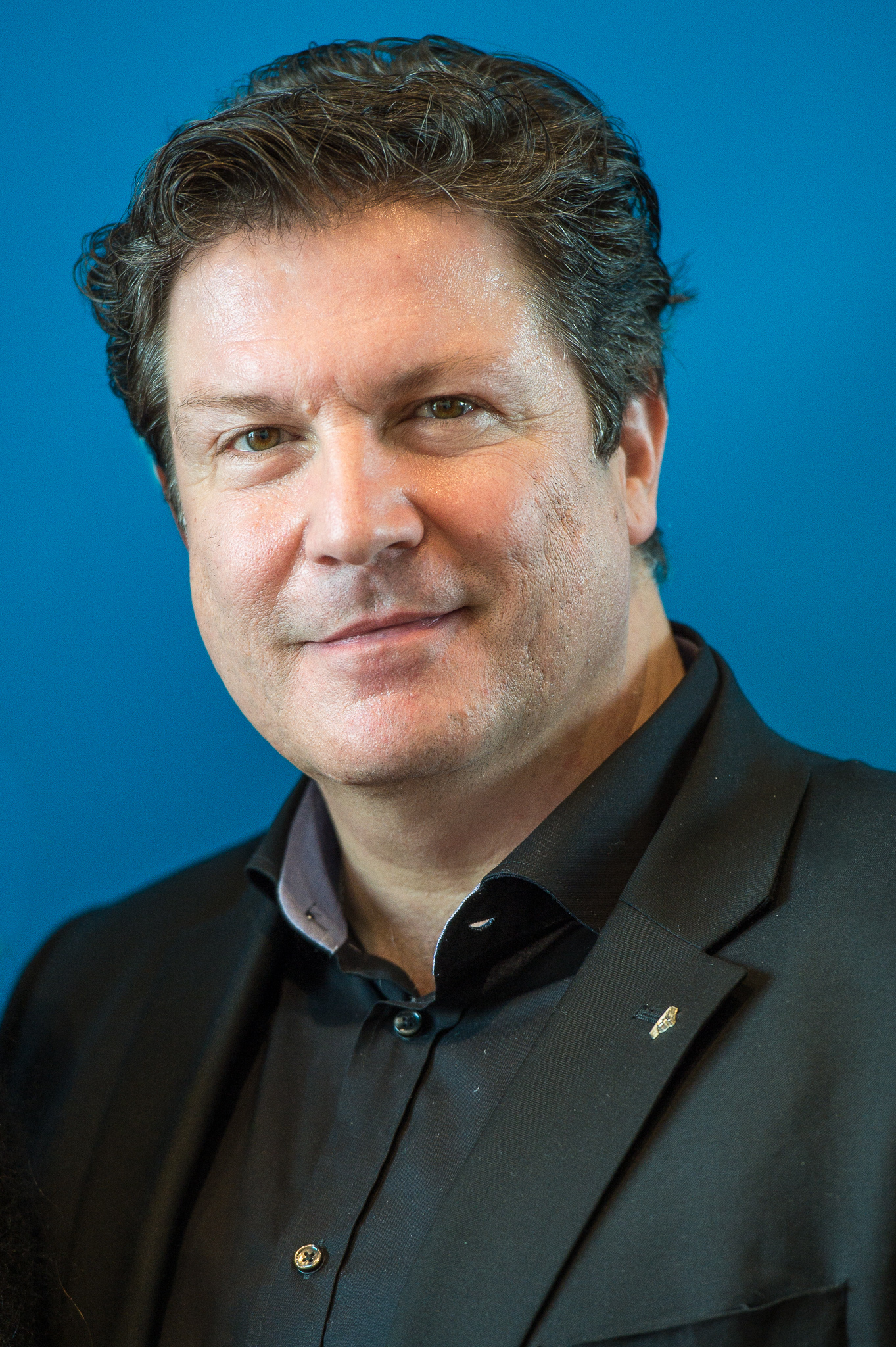
- Francis Fulton-Smith
- Born: 25 April 1966 (age 60); Munich, West Germany
- Occupation: actor
- Years active: 1985—
- Website: http://www.fulton-smith.de

Francis Fulton-Smith (born 25 April 1966) is a British-German television actor.

== Life ==
Fulton-Smith was born in Munich, West Germany, the son of a German mother and an English father. After graduating school he trained as an actor at the Otto-Falckenberg-Schule in Munich. Since 1991 he has performed in theater and has appeared in more than 150 films, mostly as a leading man. In 2013 he played the former Bavarian Prime Minister Franz-Josef Strauß in Public Enemies. In 2014 he won the “BAMBI” and the “German Acting Award” for this part. In 2016 he played Hermann Goering in “The Good Goering.”

He has two daughters (born 2009, 2012) living in Munich. In 2011 he founded a production company called Little Door Films and produced film “Murder in Athens” for the German broadcaster ARD. After winning the Special Jury Distinction Award and the Audience Award at EIFF in Canada, his short film “Someone” was qualified for an Academy Award.

== Acting career ==
=== Television, Movies ===
- 1993: Madame Bäurin (directed by Franz Xaver Bogner)
- 1993: Das Schicksal der Lilian H. (TV)
- 1993: Derrick (TV series)
- 1994: I Desire You (TV)
- 1994: Deutschlandlied (TV miniseries)
- 1994: Café Meineid (TV series)
- 1994: Schade um Papa (TV series)
- 1994: Ärzte: Dr. Schwarz und Dr. Martin (TV series)
- 1995: Kabel und Liebe (TV)
- 1995: Faust (TV series)
- 1995: Die Drei (TV series)
- 1995: Die Diebinnen (Regie: Peter Weck)
- 1996: Gestohlenes Mutterglück (Du bist mein Kind) (TV)
- 1996: Die Babysitterin – Schreie aus dem Kinderzimmer (TV)
- 1996: Die Geliebte (TV series)
- 1996: Sünde einer Nacht (TV)
- 1997: Child Murder (TV)
- 1997: Der dreckige Tod (TV)
- 1997: Dein Tod ist die gerechte Strafe (TV)
- 1997: Betrogen – Eine Ehe am Ende (TV)
- 1998: Gehetzt – Der Tod im Sucher (TV)
- 1998: Das Finale (TV)
- 1998: HeliCops – Einsatz über Berlin (TV series)
- 1998: Wolffs Revier (TV series)
- 1998: Tristan und Isolde – Eine Liebe für die Ewigkeit (Il cuore e la spada) (TV)
- 1998: Schmetterlinge der Nacht (TV)
- 1998: Der Schandfleck (TV)
- 1999: Café Meineid (TV series)
- 1999: Wolffs Revier (TV series)
- 1999–2002: Klinikum Berlin Mitte – Leben in Bereitschaft (TV series)
- 2000: Das Traumschiff – Las Vegas (TV series)
- 2000: Mutter wider Willen (TV)
- 2000: Ein Geschenk der Liebe (TV)
- 2001: Die Pferdefrau (TV)
- 2001: Der Club der grünen Witwen (TV)
- 2001: SOKO Kitzbühel (TV)
- 2001: Alicia (TV miniseries)
- 2001: Hässliche Vaterliebe ... und ihre Lippen schweigen (TV)
- 2001: The Time of Passion (TV)
- 2002: Drei mit Herz (TV series)
- 2002: Rosamunde Pilcher – Gewissheit des Herzens (TV)
- 2002: Tierärztin Dr. Mertens (TV)
- 2002: Club der Träume – Mexico/Yucatán (TV series)
- 2002: Club der Träume – Türkei/Marmaris (TV series)
- 2002: Cologne P.D. (TV series)
- 2002: Tatort (TV series)
- 2002: Wolffs Revier (TV series)
- 2002: Ich werde immer bei euch sein (TV)
- 2003: Baltic Storm (directed by Reuben Leder)
- 2003: Geerbtes Glück (TV)
- 2003–2020: Familie Dr. Kleist (TV series)
- 2003: Die Kinder meiner Braut (TV)
- 2004: Der Bulle von Tölz (TV series)
- 2004: Ein Paradies für Tiere (TV)
- 2004: SOKO 5113 (TV series)
- 2004: Die Rosenheim-Cops (TV series)
- 2004: Das Haus der Harmonie (TV)
- 2004: Die Landärztin (TV)
- 2004: Lieben und Töten (TV)
- 2005: Ein Paradies für Tiere
- 2005: Lauras Wunschzettel (TV)
- 2005: SOKO Kitzbühel (TV series)
- 2005: Unter den Linden – Das Haus Gravenhorst (TV series)
- 2005: Folge deinem Herzen (TV)
- 2006: Das Traumschiff – Shanghai (TV series)
- 2006: Vaterherz (TV)
- 2006: Ein Paradies für Pferde
- 2006: SOKO Rhein-Main (TV series)
- 2006: Für immer Afrika (TV)
- 2006: Günstige Prognose (directed by Peter Ladkani)
- 2007–2010: Ihr Auftrag, Pater Castell (TV series)
- 2007: Afrika im Herzen (TV)
- 2007: 80 Minutes (directed by Thomas Jahn)
- 2008: Ship of No Return: The Final Voyage of the Gustloff (TV)
- 2008: 30 Karat Liebe (TV)
- 2008: Ein Fall von Liebe (TV)
- 2008: Kommissar LaBréa – Tod an der Bastille (TV series)
- 2009: Baby frei Haus
- 2009: Kommissar LaBréa – Mord in der Rue St. Lazare (TV series)
- 2009: Kommissar LaBréa – Todesträume am Montparnasse (TV series)
- 2010: Funny Movie: Biss zur großen Pause – Das Highschool Vampir Grusical (TV)
- 2010: Das Traumhotel – Malediven (TV series)
- 2010: Ein Fall von Liebe – Saubermänner (TV)
- 2010: Der Film Deines Lebens (directed by Sebastian Goder)
- 2010: Willkommen in Kölleda (TV)
- 2010: Alarm für Cobra 11 – Die Autobahnpolizei (TV series)
- 2011: Lindburgs Fall (TV)
- 2011: Ein Fall für zwei (TV series)
- 2011: Die Rosenheim-Cops (TV series)
- 2011: Stuttgart Homicide (TV series)
- 2011: SOKO Wismar (TV series)
- 2011: Küstenwache (TV series)
- 2011: Das Traumschiff – Spezial – USA/Brasilien (TV series)
- 2012: Die Garmisch-Cops (TV series)
- 2012: Der Bergdoktor – Virus
- 2012: In aller Freundschaft (TV series)
- 2013: A World Beyond (TV)
- 2013: Heiter bis tödlich: Hubert & Staller (TV series)
- 2013: Kripo Holstein – Mord und Meer (TV series)
- 2013: SOKO 5113 (TV series)
- 2013: Rosamunde Pilcher – Evitas Rache (TV)
- 2014: Cologne P.D. (TV series)
- 2014: Public Enemies (TV)
- 2014: Ein Fall von Liebe – Annas Baby (TV)
- 2014: Ein Fall von Liebe (TV series)
- 2015: Er und Sie (Short)
- 2016: Der Staatsanwalt (TV series)
- 2016: Der gute Göring (TV film)
- 2016: Der Athen-Krimi – Trojanische Pferde (TV film)
- 2016: Schweinskopf al dente
- 2016: SOKO Wismar – Schwarzes Gold (TV series)
- 2017: Rosamunde Pilcher – Wie von einem anderen Stern (TV)
- 2017: Grießnockerlaffäre
- 2017: Irgendwer (Short)
- 2017: Gift
- 2017: Der Alte (TV series)
- 2017: Der Traum von der Neuen Welt – Rekorde
- 2017: SOKO Stuttgart – Mord am Grill (TV series)
- 2017: SOKO München – Puppen von Pasing (TV series)
- 2017: Mata Hari – Tanz mit dem Tod (TV film)
- 2018: Reich oder tot (TV film)
- 2018: Gefangen – Der Fall K. (TV film)
- 2018: Der Richter (TV film)
- 2018: Der Nesthocker (TV film)
- 2018: München Grill (TV series)
- 2018: Bella Germania – L'amore – Die Liebe (TV series)
- 2019: Ein Dorf wehrt sich
- 2019: Der Ballonmörder
- 2020: Matze, Kebab und Sauerkraut (TV film)
- 2020: Spides (TV series)
- 2020: Oktoberfest 1900 (TV series)
- 2021: Blackout (TV series)
- 2022: Herzogpark (TV series)
- 2022: Die Toten von Salzburg – Schattenspiel (TV series)
- 2022: Stubbe – Ausgeliefert (TV series)
- 2023: Wilsberg: Folge mir (TV series)
- 2023: Polizeiruf 110: Paranoia (TV series)
- 2023: Die Diplomatin – Vermisst in Rom (TV series)
- 2024: Al-Boom (TV series)

=== Theatre ===
- 1988–1990: Münchner Kammerspiele
- 1990–1993: Württembergische Landesbühne Esslingen
- 1993–1995: Staatstheater Braunschweig
- 1995/1996: Deutsches Schauspielhaus Hamburg
- 2012/2013: Jedermann in the Berliner Dom
- 2023: Club der toten Dichter in the Stiftsruine Bad Hersfeld, also with the assistance of Tom Schulman.
