= Grafenrheinfeld =

- Municipality
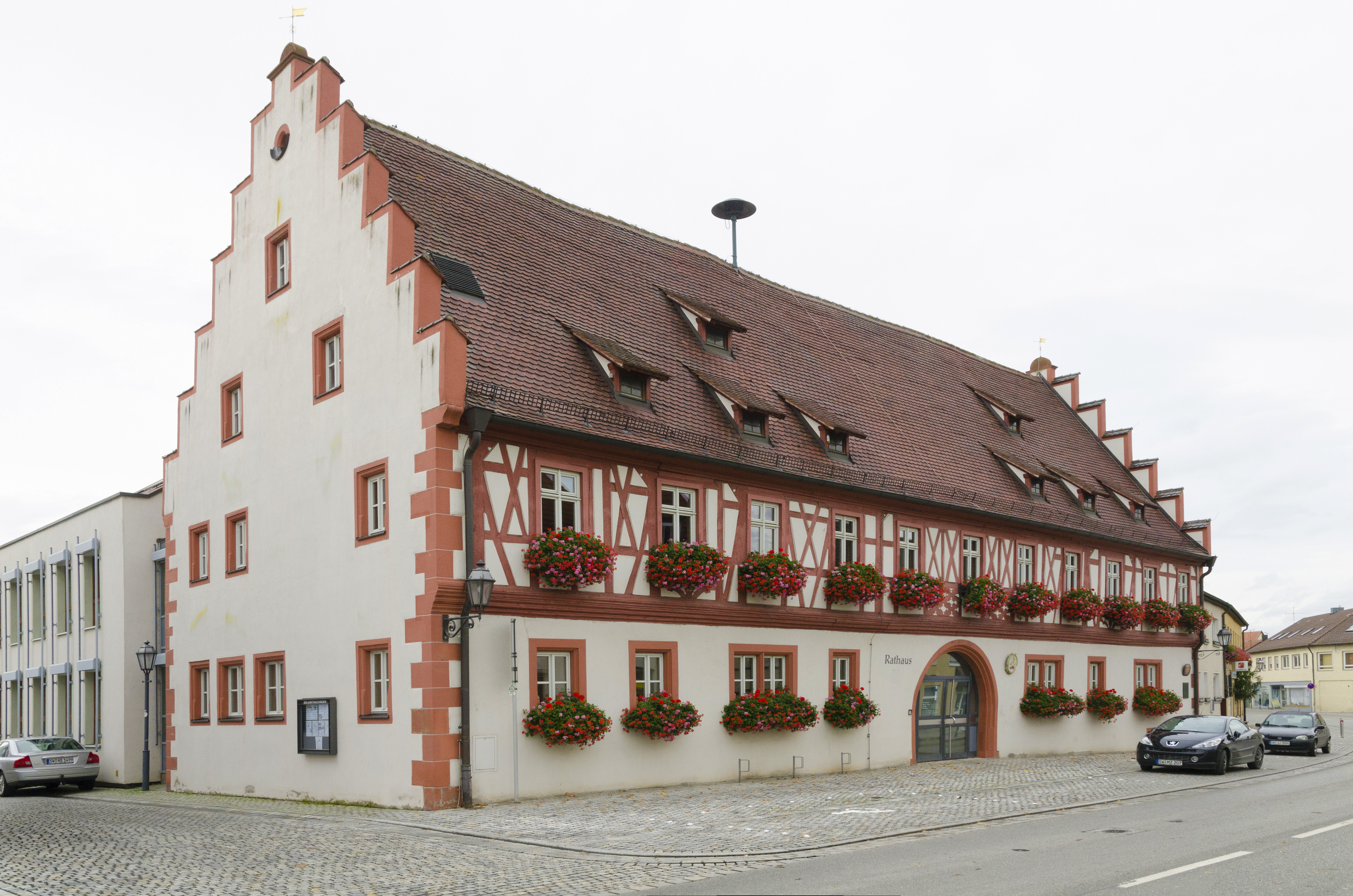
- Town hall

- Coat of arms

- Location of Grafenrheinfeld within Schweinfurt district
- Interactive map of Grafenrheinfeld
- Location within Germany Location within Bavaria
- Coordinates: 50°0′N 10°12′E
- Country: Germany
- State: Bavaria
- Admin. region: Unterfranken
- District: Schweinfurt

Government
  - Mayor (2019–25): Christian Keller (CSU)

Area
  - Total: 11.35 km^{2} (4.38 sq mi)
- Elevation: 208 m (682 ft)

Population (2025-12-31)
  - Total: 3,488
  - Density: 307.3/km^{2} (795.9/sq mi)
- Time zone: UTC+01:00 (CET)
  - Summer (DST): UTC+02:00 (CEST)
- Postal codes: 97506
- Dialling codes: 09723
- Vehicle registration: SW
- Website: www.grafenrheinfeld.de

Grafenrheinfeld is a municipality in the district of Schweinfurt in Bavaria, Germany. The municipality is home to the nuclear power station, Grafenrheinfeld, which opened in 1982.

== Grafenrheinfeld Nuclear Power Station ==
The nuclear power station Grafenrheinfeld (short: KKG - not to confused with the similarly abbreviated nuclear power station Goesgen in Switzerland) is located south of Schweinfurt at the Main. Commencement of construction was 1974, start-up took place 1981. It consists of a 3rd Generation pressurized water reactor ("pre-Konvoi") with an electrical output of 1345 MW. Operator is the E.ON nuclear power GmbH headquartered in Hanover. The two cooling towers with a height of 143 m are visible from far away. The nuclear power station was "power station world champion" in both years 1984 and 1985. In the much discussed anti-nuclear power novel Die Wolke by Gudrun Pausewang, a fictitious nuclear disaster occurs at Grafenrheinfeld, releasing a radioactive cloud which pollutes much of Germany. In the film of the same name, a fictitious plant name is used. Temporary storage facilities for depleted core fuel elements at the location went into use on 1 March 2006.

=== KFU-Mast ===
The KFU (nuclear reactor remote control, German Kernenergiefernüberwachung) mast Grafenrheinfeld is a guyed steel framework mast for the measurement of meteorological parameters and environmental radioactivity. It is visible for a long distance and is outside of the plant area approximately 750 meters south the power station. The KFU-mast is 164 meters high and was built in 1977/78.
