= KKG =

KKG may refer to:

- Gösgen Nuclear Power Plant, in Switzerland
- Grafenrheinfeld nuclear power plant, in Germany
- Kappa Kappa Gamma
- Kingdom Kerry Gaels, a Gaelic football club in London
- Mabaka Valley Kalinga language
