= Grafenrheinfeld nuclear power plant =

Decommissioned electricity-generating facility near Grafenrheinfeld, Germany

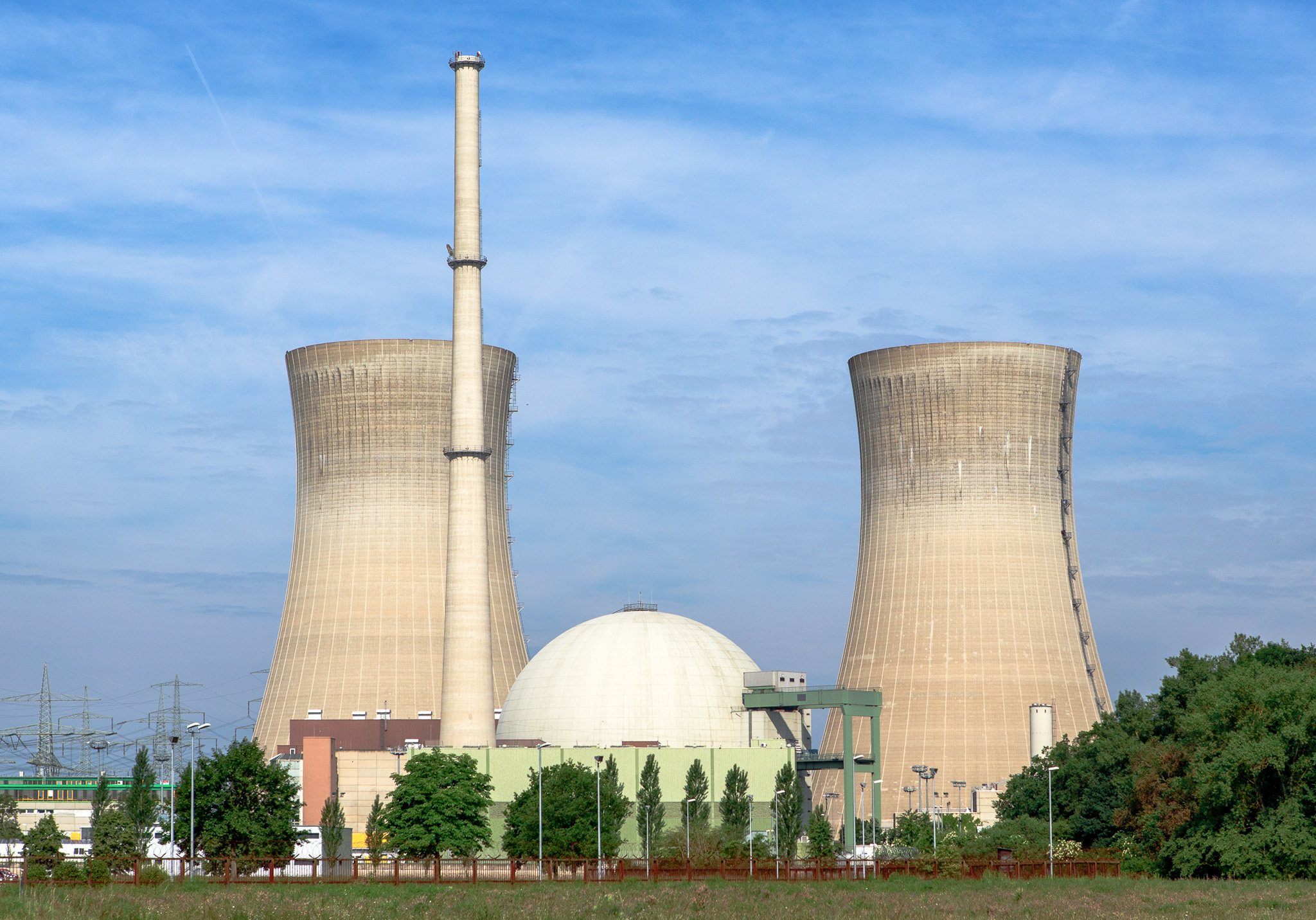
- Official name: Kernkraftwerk Grafenrheinfeld
- Country: Germany
- Location: Grafenrheinfeld
- Coordinates: 49°59′2.71″N 10°11′4.81″E
- Status: Demolished
- Construction began: January 1, 1975
- Commission date: December 21, 1981
- Decommission date: 28 June 2015
- Owner: PreussenElektra
- Operator: PreussenElektra

Nuclear power station
- Reactor type: PWR
- Reactor supplier: Siemens
- Cooling towers: 2
- Cooling source: River Main

Power generation
- Units operational: 1 x 1,345 MW
- Make and model: Siemens
- Nameplate capacity: 1,345 MW
- Capacity factor: 80.0%
- Annual net output: 9,425 GW·h

External links
- Website: Plant's site on E.ON's site
- Commons: Related media on Commons

The Grafenrheinfeld nuclear power plant (German: Kernkraftwerk Grafenrheinfeld, KKG) is a now-offline electricity-generating facility near Grafenrheinfeld, south of Schweinfurt at the river Main. The plant's single reactor had a nameplate capacity of 1,345 megawatts. The plant operated from 1981 to June 28, 2015, when it was taken offline as part of the phase out policy for nuclear power in Germany. As a result of the plant's closure, Germany has increasingly relied on coal, natural gas, and renewable energy to generate electricity.

== Construction and history ==
Construction took place between 1974 and 1981, which cost around 2.5 billion DM. The reactor, a Vor-Konvoi German third-generation pressurized water reactor, was built by Siemens and achieved first criticality on December 9, 1981.

The reactor had a maximum gross electrical power output of 1,345 megawatts, a maximum net electrical power output of 1,275 megawatts and a maximum thermal power output of 3765 megawatts.

The plant is managed by PreussenElektra GmbH. The two 143-metre (469 ft) tall cooling towers were visible from far away. As with almost all other nuclear plants, temporary storage facilities for spent nuclear fuel are present on site. There is an information center at the power station.

Under the phase out policy for nuclear power in Germany, the plant was scheduled to shut down on 31 December 2015. Citing economic reasons, E.ON declared intent to shut down the plant earlier, originally at the end of May 2015.

== Decommissioning and demolition ==
The Grafenrheinfeld plant was taken offline on June 28, 2015, six months before it was scheduled to close on December 3, 2015 as part of Germany's ongoing policy to shut all nuclear power plants down in the country by 2022. The plant owners decided it was uneconomical to continue operation as planned.

Since its closure, the plant was inoperative, and on 16th August 2024 the cooling towers were demolished using explosives. The demolition was delayed momentarily by a pro-nuclear protester who had climbed ten meters up a power transmission pole within the blast radius.

== In the media ==
In the anti-nuclear teen novel Die Wolke (1987), the power plant undergoes a meltdown.
