= Carina Wiese =

German actress (born 1968)

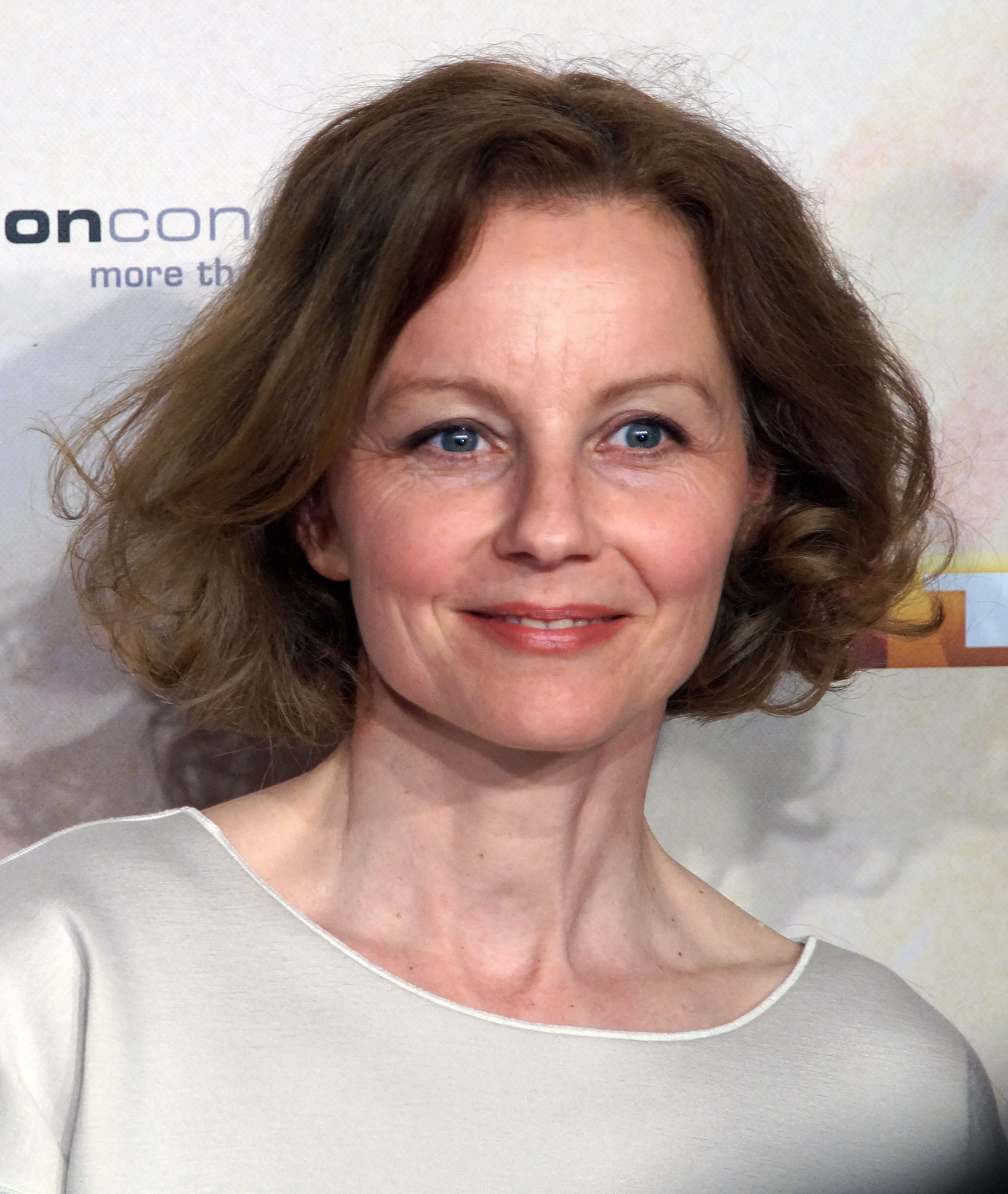
- Wiese in April 2016
- Born: 26 February 1968 (age 57); Dresden, Saxony, East Germany
- Occupation: Actress
- Website: carinawiese.de

Carina Nicolette Wiese (born 26 February 1968) is a German actress.

== Personal life and career ==
Wiese was born in Dresden, East Germany, where she went to school and began acting at a youth theatre in Pirna from a young age.

She completed an apprenticeship as a clothing worker with high school diploma as well as evening studies in painting and graphics at the academy of arts in Dresden, as she originally wanted to become a costume designer.

In 1988 Wiese went on to study acting at Theaterhochschule Leipzig. She finished her studies early in 1991, following her first acting engagement at Schauspiel Leipzig.

Having been a member of the ensemble of the Schauspiel Leipzig from 1991 to 1993 Wiese also appeared on theatre stages in Germany's capital, Berlin, and her home-town, Dresden. In addition to theatre Wiese has performed in radio dramas, feature films and a variety of popular German TV shows of different genres.

In 2006 she played the role of the mother in the film adaptation of the novel of the same name by Gudrun Pausewang, The Cloud. In the film Your Happiness Depends on Me by Sören Senn Wiese starred as the young assistant doctor Katja. In 2008 she acted in Everyone Else, and in Phantom Pain in 2009. In 2010, Wiese took on the role of the daughter in the marriage drama Colors in the Dark. In 2011 she was seen in Three. In 2013 Wiese appeared in the film The Book Thief. Wiese portrayed the supporting role of Andrea Schäfer in the German TV series Alarm für Cobra 11 – Die Autobahnpolizei for nearly ten years, and returns occasionally as a guest star.

Wiese is a member of The German Film Academy. From 2005 to 2007, Wiese also trained as an astrologer at the Astrology Centre Berlin with Alexander von Schlieffen and Markus Jehle. In 2006, Wiese started teaching as a lecturer at the acting school Art of Acting Berlin and at Hochschule für Musik und Theater Leipzig from 2011 to 2013 with a focus in "working in front of the camera".

Wiese has a son, born in 1992.

== Selected filmography ==
- since 1997: Alarm für Cobra 11 – Die Autobahnpolizei (German TV series)
- 1998: Der Clown – In der Zange (German TV series)
- 2001–2003: Der Ermittler (German TV series, 6 episodes)
- 2003–2005: Alarm für Cobra 11 – Einsatz für Team 2 ( German TV series, 2 episodes)
- 2005: Your Happiness Depends on Me (Feature film)
- 2006: The Cloud (Feature film)
- 2006–2010: SOKO Wismar (German TV series, 2 episodes)
- 2007: Leipzig Homicide (German TV series, episode: " Der Komplize")
- 2007: Die Rosenheim-Cops (German TV series, episode: "Fit in den Tod")
- 2009: Der Kriminalist (German TV series, episode: "Mauer im Kopf")
- 2009: Effi Briest (Feature film)
- 2009: Phantom Pain (Feature film)
- 2009: Everyone Else (Feature film)
- 2010: Three (Feature film)
- 2011: Colors in the Dark (Feature film)
- 2011: Der Kriminalist (German TV series, episode: "Sucht")
- 2012: Letzte Spur Berlin (German TV series, episode: "Erlebensfall")
- 2012: Leipzig Homicide (German TV series, episode: "Wir sind nicht allein")
- 2012: The Tower (Feature film)
- 2012: Tatort – Todesschütze (German TV series)
- 2012: Notruf Hafenkante (German TV series, episode: "Riskante Entscheidung")
- 2012: Shores of Hope (Feature film)
- 2013: The Book Thief (Feature film)
- 2014: Cologne P.D. (German TV series, episode: "Auf der schiefen Bahn")
- 2014: Ein Fall von Liebe (Feature film)
- 2015: Deutschland 83 (German miniseries, 8 episodes)
- 2015: Tatort – Kälter als der Tod (German TV series)
- 2016: Zwei Leben. Eine Hoffnung (Feature film)
- 2017: Marie Brand und das ewige Wettrennen (Feature film)
- 2017: Dengler – Die schützende Hand (German TV series)
- 2018: The Silent Revolution (Feature film)
- 2018: Deutschland 86 (German miniseries, 2 episodes)
- 2019–: Dark (German TV series)
