= The Final Game =

The Final Game may refer to:

- The Final Game (1998 film), 1998 German film;
- The Final Game (2022 film), 2022 Spanish-Andorran film.
- The Final Game, an unmade serial of the British science fiction television series Doctor Who
