= Mladkov =

- Market town
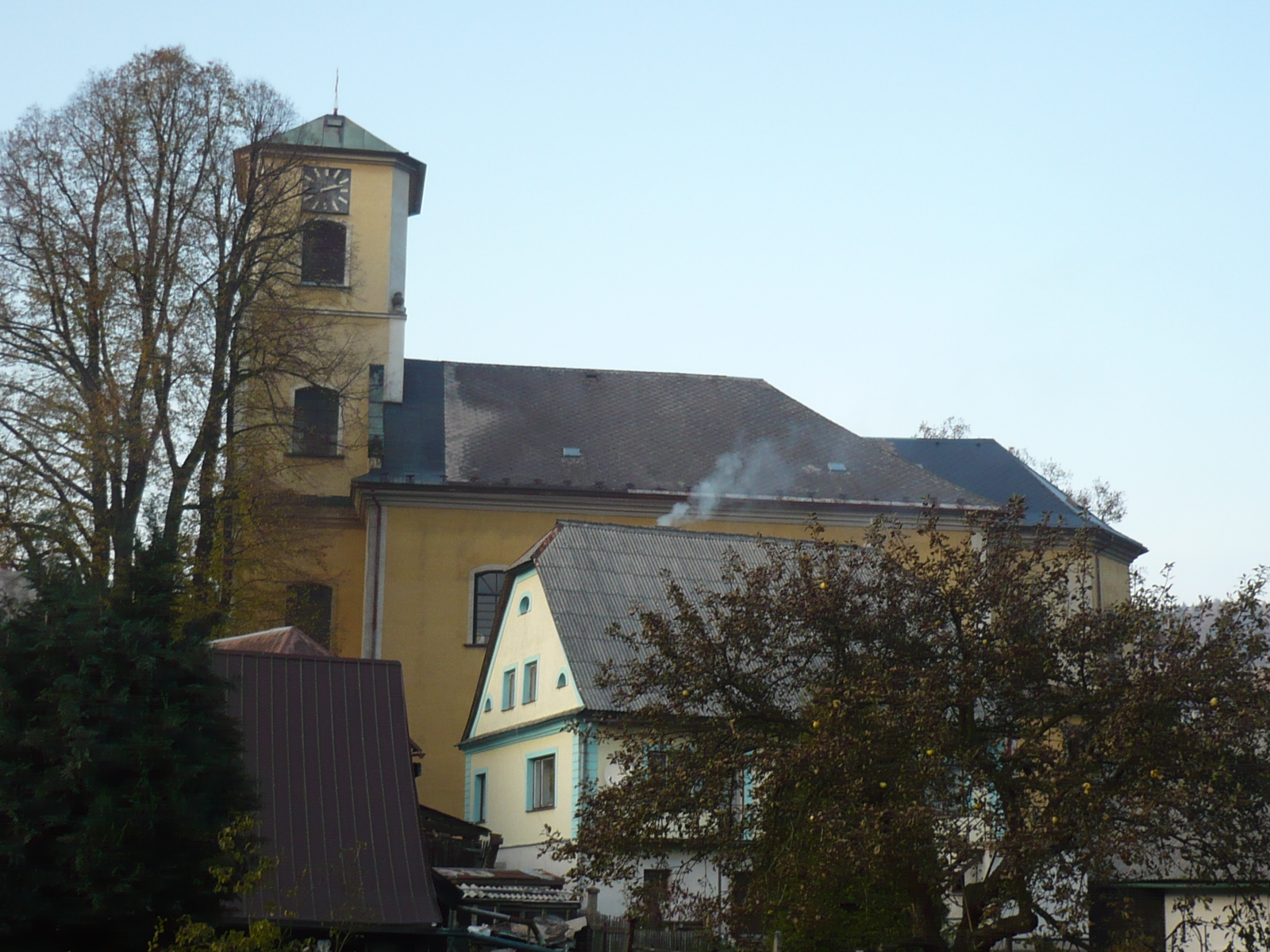
- Church of Saint John the Baptist

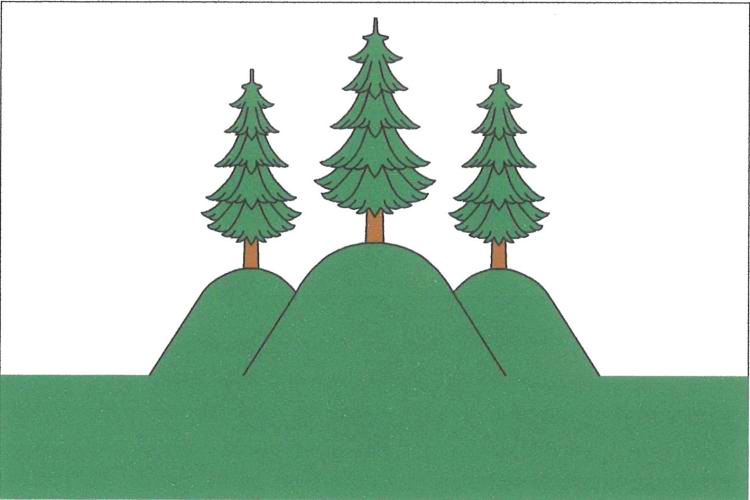
- Flag Coat of arms

- Location in the Czech Republic
- Coordinates: 50°5′49″N 16°37′37″E
- Country: Czech Republic
- Region: Pardubice
- District: Ústí nad Orlicí
- First mentioned: 1350

Area
  - Total: 12.80 km^{2} (4.94 sq mi)
- Elevation: 508 m (1,667 ft)

Population (2026-01-01)
  - Total: 555
  - Density: 43.4/km^{2} (112/sq mi)
- Time zone: UTC+1 (CET)
  - Summer (DST): UTC+2 (CEST)
- Postal code: 561 67
- Website: www.mladkov.cz

Mladkov (Czech pronunciation: [ˈmlatkof]; German: Wichstadtl) is a market town in Ústí nad Orlicí District in the Pardubice Region of the Czech Republic. It has about 600 inhabitants.

== Administrative division ==
Mladkov consists of four municipal parts (in brackets population according to the 2021 census):

- Mladkov (380)
- Dolany (19)
- Petrovičky (5)
- Vlčkovice (102)

== Etymology ==
The name Mladkov is derived from the personal name Mládek, meaning "Mládek's (court)".

== Geography ==
Mladkov is located about 21 kilometres (13 mi) northeast of Ústí nad Orlicí and 59 km (37 mi) east of Pardubice. It lies in the Orlické Mountains. The highest point is the mountain Vysoký kámen at 843 m (2,766 ft) above sea level. The market town is situated on the right bank of the Tichá Orlice River.

== History ==
The first written mention of Mladkov is from 1350. Until the early 16th century, it was part of the Žampach estate. In 1513, a small wooden fortress was built here and Mladkov became a separate estate. Already in 1548, the fortress was in a desolate state and Mladkov ceased to be a separate estate.

From 1938 to 1945, Mladkov was annexed by Nazi Germany and administered as part of the Reichsgau Sudetenland. After World War II, the German-speaking population was expelled.

== Demographics ==
Historical population

Year	Pop.	±%
1869	1,826	—
1880	1,850	+1.3%
1890	1,712	−7.5%
1900	1,500	−12.4%
1910	1,347	−10.2%

Year	Pop.	±%
1921	1,194	−11.4%
1930	1,195	+0.1%
1950	698	−41.6%
1961	763	+9.3%
1970	805	+5.5%

Year	Pop.	±%
1980	669	−16.9%
1991	601	−10.2%
2001	585	−2.7%
2011	520	−11.1%
2021	506	−2.7%

Source: Censuses

== Transport ==
Mladkov is located on the railway line Ústí nad Orlicí–Moravský Karlov.

== Sights ==
The main landmark of Mladkov is the Church of Saint John the Baptist. It is a rural early Baroque church dating from 1697. It was modified in 1736–1744 and in 1842. The church area includes a statue of Saint John of Nepomuk from 1756.

== Notable people ==
- Gudrun Pausewang (1928–2020), German children's writer
