= Fifth Commandment =

The Fifth Commandment of the Ten Commandments may refer to:

- "Honour thy father and thy mother" under the Philonic division used by Hellenistic Jews, Greek Orthodox and Protestants except Lutherans, or the Talmudic division of the third-century Jewish Talmud.
- "Thou shalt not kill" under the Augustinian division used by Roman Catholics and Lutherans.
- The Fifth Commandment (film), a 1978 film with Helmut Berger, directed by Duccio Tessari
- The Fifth Commandment (TV series), a German television series
- The Fifth Commandment, a 2008 film written and produced by Rick Yune
- Ika-5 Utos
