= The Last Children of Schewenborn =

1983 book by Gudrun Pausewang

- German edition cover
- Author: Gudrun Pausewang
- Language: German
- Genre: Drama
- Publication date: 1983
- Publication place: West Germany
- Media type: Print (Hardback and paperback)

The Last Children of Schewenborn (German: Die letzten Kinder von Schewenborn) is a 1983 novel by Gudrun Pausewang, depicting life in rural Germany in the aftermath of a nuclear war.

While the story is entirely fictional, Pausewang confirmed in the book's epilogue that she created its main setting, the small town of Schewenborn, in the image of Schlitz in East Hesse, where she herself used to live.

== Plot summary ==
The plot is set within the framework of a Cold War scenario very similar to the geopolitical situation at the time of writing. It is told from the perspective of Roland Bennewitz, a 12-year-old boy from Bonames (a district of Frankfurt), who travels with his parents and sisters to visit his grandparents in Schewenborn.

During their journey, they are surprised by a nuclear attack. As emergency response systems fail to activate and no humanitarian aid reaches them, the survivors have to assume that the whole of Germany, or even the entire civilized world, may have been destroyed. During the course of the next few months, it becomes clear that Frankfurt, Berlin and major German cities, as well as the adjacent Netherlands and Czechoslovakia were also targeted, given the arrival of seriously burnt and radiation-scarred refugees from those areas. The question of whether this is actually the truth is only resolved by the end of the novel.

The Bennewitz family finds refuge in the house of their grandparents, who were in Fulda at the time of the nuclear explosion and presumably died there. Shortly afterwards, Roland's mother takes in a young brother and sister who had been made orphans by the bombs.

The later chapters of the story describe the weeks, months and years after the nuclear attack, and are almost exclusively set in Schewenborn.

The Last Children of Schewenborn does not have a happy ending. One by one, members of Roland Bennewitz' family, including his new foster-siblings, birth sisters, younger brother, mother and a severely impaired newborn sibling, die of radiation sickness, childbirth and uncontrollable epidemic disease given the absence of food and medicine, as do the village's other surviving adult inhabitants, orphaning any consequent children born after the nuclear holocaust. By the end of the book, only Roland, his father, and a small group of boys and girls who represent the titular last children remain alive, and the final paragraphs suggest that they, too, will perish, given the prevalence of cancer, uncurable pandemic disease, food shortages and nuclear fallout in the post-apocalyptic environment. Poignantly, Roland implies that the children probably will not survive to adulthood, given the widespread presence of genetic damage and consequent impaired health amongst them.

== Major themes ==
The book is written as a cautionary tale in its clear intent to deliver a stern warning to both civilians and world leaders, similar to other dystopian and post-apocalyptic literature.

It is aimed at a juvenile audience in particular, consequentially becoming part of recommended reading lists in several West German states, mostly directed at teenagers around the eighth grade.

A similar theme, also specifically targeted at a younger audience, appears in Pausewang's other great literary success, Die Wolke. Both books convey a feeling of dark, impending danger commonly shared by members of the German Environmentalist Movement of the 1980s.

== Translations into English ==
Given 1980s Cold War anxieties about the possible imminence of nuclear war between NATO and the Warsaw Pact, the book was translated into English in both Canada and the United Kingdom. It was also translated into French, Spanish, Danish and Braille.

== Awards and nominations ==
- Buxtehuder Bulle, 1983
- Zürcher Kinderbuchpreis (Zürich children's literature prize)
- Preis der Leseratten
- Gustav-Heinemann-Friedenspreis (Gustav Heinemann peace prize)
