= Gregor Schnitzler =

German film director (born 1964)

- Born: 1964 (age 61–62); Berlin, Germany
- Occupation: Film director
- Years active: 1991-present

Gregor Schnitzler (born 1964) is a German film director. He directed more than fifteen films since 1991. His best-known films are What to Do in Case of Fire? and The Cloud based on the novel by Gudrun Pausewang.

His father, Conrad, was well known for his work in experimental music and for being an early member of both Tangerine Dream and Cluster (spelled Kluster during his period with the group.)

== Selected filmography ==
Year	Title	Notes
2000	Finnlandia	
2001	What to Do in Case of Fire?	
2003	Soloalbum	
2006	The Cloud	
2008	Heat Wave	TV film
2013	Gaming Instinct	
2014	The Ingredients of Love	TV film
2015	Call Me Helen	TV film
2019	Lotte am Bauhaus	TV film
2019	Bella Germania	3-part miniseries
2021	School of Magical Animals	
2022	Auris	TV film
