= What to Do in Case of Fire? =

German film directed by Gregor Schnitzler

- Theatrical release poster
- Directed by: Gregor Schnitzler
- Written by: Stefan Dähnert; Anne Wild
- Produced by: Jakob Claussen; Andrea Wilson; Thomas Wöbke
- Starring: Til Schweiger; Martin Feifel
- Cinematography: Andreas Berger
- Edited by: Hansjörg Weißbrich
- Music by: Stephan Zacharias
- Production companies: Deutsche Columbia Pictures Filmproduktion; Claussen+Wöbke Filmproduktion
- Distributed by: Columbia TriStar Film GmbH
- Release dates: November 2001 (Germany); 19 July 2002 (U.S.)
- Running time: 101 minutes
- Language: German

What to Do in Case of Fire? (German: Was tun, wenn's brennt?) is a 2002 German film directed by Gregor Schnitzler. It premiered in November 2001 at the German film festival Kinofest Lünen and was released to theaters in 2002. Part comedy, part action and part drama, the movie is set in contemporary Berlin and stars German action star Til Schweiger.

The film received mixed reviews from critics.

== Plot ==
Set in Berlin, the film opens in 1987 to show a group of radicals battling police, but soon moves to the modern day to present the same radical characters brought together once more by an act they carried out in their anti-establishment heyday.

In 1987, the main characters of the film are anarchists squatting in an abandoned building in Kreuzberg and making propaganda films. In one of these films, they demonstrate how to make a homemade bomb out of a pressure cooker and chemicals available over the counter, and they plant the bomb in a vacant villa in Grunewald. However, the timer sticks, and the bomb does not go off until 12 years later, when it is jostled by a real estate broker and a potential buyer. They are injured in the blast, and the police are pressured to hunt down the "terrorists" responsible.

Two of the original anarchists, Tim (Schweiger) and Hotte (Martin Feifel), still live in the original building and engage in anti-police graffiti, anti-gentrification protests and petty theft. The current owner of the building, a nouveau riche Turk named Bülent, cannot evict them, because Hotte is disabled, having lost his legs. (It is later revealed that they were crushed by a water cannon during a riot.) While Tim is out, the police raid the building in a sweep for clues to the bombing and confiscate their cache of old films, including the incriminating bomb-making film. They cart the films off to the fortresslike police headquarters, a former Prussian military barracks. One by one, Tim and Hotte visit the former members of their group to warn them of the bust. They are distressed by the news, having gone on with their lives: Nele (Nadja Uhl) is a single mother of two young children; "Terror" (Matthias Matschke) is an attorney; Maik (Sebastian Blomberg) runs an advertising agency that exploits radical imagery; and Flo (Doris Schretzmayer), Tim's former lover, has evidently gone bourgeois, although her circumstances are never fully explained, and is about to get married. They balk when Tim and Hotte propose breaking into the police headquarters and destroying the evidence, but Terror's counter-suggestion that they should turn themselves in is met with even stronger disagreement, and finally the former radicals devise the plan of infiltrating the headquarters by pretending to be a television news crew.

A rift within the police department makes their plan possible: Manowsky (Klaus Löwitsch), an old-school Berlin cop, wants to use aggressive tactics and avoid press coverage, while Henkel (Devid Striesow), a technocrat from Bonn, prefers more modern, less intrusive methods and is eager to earn good public relations for the department. Henkel gives the "TV crew" a tour of the police headquarters, including the evidence room where the films are stashed. Manowsky interrupts the tour, and the former radicals barely manage to slip away.

To destroy the films, the radicals decide to smuggle a second homemade bomb into the evidence room as a Trojan horse: all the evidence is stored alphabetically according to the street where it was found, so they need only plant the bomb in a suspicious-looking crate in their old building and entice the police into picking it up. What the other radicals do not know is that Hotte intends to smuggle himself into the evidence room inside the crate along with the bomb, to make sure it's placed correctly. Hotte, without his wheelchair (he uses a dolly), is trapped in the evidence room when the emergency exit door is jammed. Frantically, he uses the phone in the room to call his compatriots, but they are all away from their phones. In desperation he calls Bülent, who at that moment is trying to talk Tim into abandoning their apartment and accepting a payoff for their few remaining goods. Tim rushes to Hotte's aid. The others eventually get Hotte's message and come to rescue him as well, but meanwhile, Manowsky intercepts Hotte and Tim in the evidence room. After a taunting lecture on their inability to let go of past ideals, Manowsky prepares to arrest the two, but the others arrive just in time to distract him. Tim seizes Manowsky's handcuffs and shackles him to the evidence cage. He threatens to leave the bomb in Manowsky's lap, but the others persuade him not to commit outright murder. Tim tosses Manowsky the handcuff keys, and the radicals flee as an alarm sounds.

Pursued by police through the headquarters, the former radicals stumble upon a water cannon and use it to drive back the police and escape. As Manowsky and Henkel observe their flight, Henkel confidently predicts that the evidence will lead to their capture. However, Manowsky – moved by the radicals' compassion, by his annoyance with Henkel and by reflection on his own long-held ideals – has left the bomb in the evidence room, and it destroys the evidence.

The group of friends walk through the streets of Berlin and end up on the floor of an S-Bahn car. Tim then pulls the incriminating film out of his bag, holds a lighter to it, and asks aloud: "What do you do if there's a fire?", and the friends answer, "Let it burn!"

The film contains mild nudity, mild drug use, and mature language.

== Cast ==
- Til Schweiger as Tim
- Sebastian Blomberg as Maik
- Martin Feifel as Hotte
- Nadja Uhl as Nele
- Doris Schretzmayer as Flo
- Matthias Matschke as Terror
- Klaus Löwitsch as Manowski
- Devid Striesow as Henkel
- Barbara Philipp as Pritt

== Reception ==
On Rotten Tomatoes the film has an approval rating of 50% based on reviews from 24 critics. On Metacritic it has a score of 47% based on reviews from 10 critics, indicating "mixed or average reviews".

Kevin Thomas of the Los Angeles Times called it "Thoughtful, even stinging at times, and lots of fun." Megan Lehmann of the New York Post wrote: "It's all entertaining enough, but don't look for any hefty anti-establishment message in what is essentially a whip-crack of a buddy movie that ends with a whimper."

Elvis Mitchell of The New York Times wrote: "This is a picture that Maik, the firebrand turned savvy ad man, would be envious of: it hijacks the heat of revolution and turns it into a sales tool."
