= Bella Germania =

- Also known as: Volevamo andare lontano - Bella Germania
- Genre: Family drama
- Based on: Bella Germania by Daniel Speck
- Written by: Robert Krause; Florian Puchert
- Directed by: Gregor Schnitzler
- Starring: Christoph Letkowski; Silvia Busuioc; Denis Moschitto; Deniz Arora; Natalia Belitski; Andrea Sawatzki
- Composer: Dominik Giesriegl
- Country of origin: Germany
- Original languages: German; Italian
- No. of series: 1
- No. of episodes: 3

Production
- Executive producer: Ronald Mühlfellner
- Running time: 270 minutes
- Production company: Bavaria Fiction

Original release
- Network: ZDF
- Release: 10 March – 13 March 2019
- Network: Rai 1
- Release: 3 June – 4 June 2019

Bella Germania ("Beautiful Germany" in Italian) is a 2019 German 3-part miniseries directed by Gregor Schnitzler, based on Daniel Speck's 2016 book of the same name. The series, consisting of three 90-minute episodes, narrates a German-Italian family story through three generations over 65 years (1954-2019).

The series premiered in Germany on ZDF in March 2019, with the episodes shown on 10, 11 and 13 March. In Italy, the series was first shown on Rai 1 on 3–4 June 2019, edited into two 135-minute episodes, under the name "Volevamo andare lontano - Bella Germania" (loosely translated as "We wanted to get far away"), which was the original Italian title for the Daniel Speck's book.

== Plot ==
=== Episode 1: L'Amore - die Liebe (The Love) ===
The series starts in Munich in 2018, when fashion designer Julia Becker (Natalia Belitski) is presenting her first very own collection. Just as she is called to the stage, she has a flashback and leaves the showroom. At the lobby, when she is trying to gather herself, she is approached by an old man, Alexander Schlewitz (Joachim Bißmeier), who tells her he wants to speak to her father, Vincenzo Marconi. Julia tells him that his father is dead, but Alexander says that he's still alive, but then collapses and is taken away by an ambulance. Julia lather goes to visit her mother Tanja (Andrea Sawatzki), a journalist and political reports author for television. Tanja continues to insist that Vincenzo died when she was eight. Julia still has her doubts, and finds out where Alexander lives, then visits him. Alexander tells Julia that he is her grandfather, then proceeds to tell Julia his story.

In 1954, Alexander is a young junior engineer (young Alexander played by Christoph Letkowski) working in BMW under Fritz Maier (Francis Fulton-Smith). BMW is currently having hard times, as the expensive 501s are not selling well. Schlewitz suggests to Maier that they sign a licensing agreement with Italian company Iso to produce Isettas, to which Maier agrees, and dispatches him to Milan to discuss it with Iso's owner Renzo Rivolta (Giovanni Moschella), with a two week deadline. Once in Milan, as Alexander attempts to talk it over with Mr. Rivolta, Rivolta doesn't understand him, but nearby, a young Sicilian woman, Giulietta Marconi (Silvia Busuioc), offers to translate for them. During a test drive, Alexander discovers a design flaw on the vehicle - it tends to lurch badly in curves and even threatens to tip over. With Giulietta's help, he promises Rivolta he can fix it in two days. With the help of Iso mechanics, including Giulietta's brother Giovanni (Denis Moschitto), he manages to fix it. Over lunch, he discovers Giulietta is very good at drawing and has a talent for fashion design. Over time, Alexander and Giulietta begin to fall in love. At a store, he buys Giulietta a pair of elegant red shoes, which she likes very much. He tells her that he has no family as his father died in the World War II Russian front and his mother and brothers were killed during the bombing of Dresden.

The test drive with Isetta is successful, and Alexander and Giulietta's brief romance blossoms. However, they're quickly brought back to earth when Giulietta tells him that she is engaged to Enzo (Deniz Arora), a co-worker at Iso. Soon, she is discovered to be pregnant out of wedlock, which in 1950s Italy is a huge scandal, and her mother insists she marry immediately. Enzo has the attributes of a southern Italian: he is quite macho, sometimes excessively temperamental, and believes quite naturally that "his" wife is also his property, and behaves accordingly. Giulietta tells Alexander that she has no other choice. Alexander then travels back to Munich. Only Giulietta knows that Alexander is the child's father.

Back in 2018, Alexander tells Julia to find her grand-uncle Giovanni, who runs an Italian restaurant in Munich. Julia locates Giovanni (Alessandro Bresanello as old man) and his wife Rosaria (Luciana Caglioti).

Milan, 1955. One year after Alexander's visit, Giulietta is now the mother of Vincenzo (who, as said in Giovanni's photo album, was baptized on 22 August 1955), and has settled into her married life with Enzo and the child. But she feels that something is missing. The confinement of the nuclear family and the red shoes, the only thing she has left from her time with Alexander, remind her that there could be another, a more fulfilling life. Giovanni then tells her that he's going to West Germany to work as a Gastarbeiter (in real life, the guest worker agreement between West Germany and Italy would be signed at the end of the same year). When Giovanni leaves, Giulietta asks him to look up Alexander in Munich. Giovanni arrives in Munich in 1956, and gets a job in Munich's Wholesale Market. At home, Enzo's jealousy is getting worse. While Giulietta receives letters from Alexander, she doesn't dare to read them and burns them in the oven.

In 1964, Giovanni returns to Italy to perform military service, and brings back for Giulietta a German sewing machine. When Giulietta, Giovanni, Enzo and Vincenzo (Mika Ullritz as a 9-year old) visit the Iso factory, they discover Alexander there talking to Renzo Rivolta. Alexander comes to them, and seeing Vincenzo, suspects that he must be his son. He gives Vincenzo, who has a fascination with anything German, a ride in his car on the Iso test track. He then tries to talk to Giulietta about coming back to Munich with him, but she tells him that her life is in Milan now, so he leaves again. However, one night, during dinner, Vincenzo and Enzo start to argue and Enzo ends up slapping Vincenzo, to which he runs off. However, Giulietta, remembering the sewing machine Giovanni brought her, remembers her passion and starts tailoring, making a red dress.

Four years later, in 1968, in the family's Sicilian village, Giovanni and Rosaria (Ana Sanchez as young adult) are getting married. At the party, when Giulietta dances with one of the musicians, Enzo gets jealous again and causes a scene. When Giulietta attempts to apologize, Enzo grabs her roughly, to which Vincenzo (played by Rafael Koussouris as a teenager) intervenes and pushes him off. Enzo tries to slap him again, but Vincenzo get the upper hand and slaps him instead before running off. Fed up with Enzo's behavior, Giulietta and Vincenzo accompany Giovanni and Rosaria as they travel to Munich, Giulietta saying that their "real" home in Italy is in Sicily, not Milan.

Back to 2018, Giovanni gives Julia the red dress Giulietta made. Julia then inspects it and decides to incorporate her grandmother's old design into her new design. Julia gets a call from Alexander's daughter Clara (Franziska Schlattner), telling her that he was hospitalized.

=== Episode 2: Il destino – das Schicksal (The Destiny) ===
In 2018, Julia travels to Turin with her grand-uncle Giovanni to meet her father, Vincenzo (played by Stefan Kurt as an old man). However, Vincenzo shows little enthusiasm for a reunion and doesn't want to see Alexander, as the latter had wished.

In 1968, when Giulietta and Vincenzo arrived in Munich with Giovanni and Rosaria, she again tried to reconnect with Alexander. She first called Alexander on the phone, but hung up without saying anything. Later, she tried to visit Alexander at his home, only to notice him with a pregnant blonde woman, Marianne (Friederike Ott), and left. Giovanni still works at the Wholesale Market, but Giulietta then helps him set up his own greengrocer's store in Munich, and she does bookkeeping for him and in her spare time sews clothes. However, suddenly she is visited by her mother and Enzo, furious that she left Italy for Germany in the dead of the night. Enzo is willing to separate, but demands that Vincenzo accompany him back to Italy. Vincenzo, however, prefers to stay with his mother. At the school, he is also bullied by the German children as a "child of immigrants". Giulietta and Alexander meet again at the hospital, where Rosaria gives birth to a boy, while Marianne also gives birth to a girl. After being rejected by several landlords for being an immigrant, Giulietta finally manages to find a room in an apartment with hippies. She is again called by Alexander, who tells her that he still can't forget her. One day, Enzo returns again. However, Giulietta does not want to return to Italy. Enzo then decides to stay in Munich and take up Giovanni's old job at the Wholesale Market, and he and Vincenzo becomes closer again. Giulietta sees that, and likes that her husband is willing to change. For some time, Alexander is forgotten. However, at Christmas, Alexander visits them while Vincenzo is alone at home, bringing for him a racing track set and for Giulietta a letter. In the letter, Giulietta finds two tickets for Rossini's Il turco in Italia at National Theatre Munich for 20 February 1969, and Alexander's phone number, causing Enzo to become jealous again. Giulietta and Alexander meet up again, and they kiss. He asks if he is Vincenzo's father, but gets no answer.

Back in 2018, Giovanni gives Julia his sister's old diary. From thereon, the story is now told on the basis of the diary.

By 1969, the relationship between Giulietta and Alexander has cooled down, because Giulietta doesn't want to choose the father of her son. Alexander agrees to pay Vincenzo's education, if Giulietta gives him photos of Vincenzo. They agree, but Giulietta doesn't tell anything to Enzo, who still believes he is the father. Enzo, meanwhile, quits his job at the Wholesale Market and takes another one at Munich U-Bahn construction, after witnessing an ad in the streets. Giulietta realizes she can't get away from Alexander any more than he can from her. However, as they kiss in Alexander's car, they witness Vincenzo being arrested with the rest of the hippies. One year later, Giulietta and Enzo finally manage to get an apartment. She continues to have an affair with Alexander. In June 1970 they make love in a hotel, the scenes interpersed with scenes of several people watching 1970 FIFA World Cup (where on 17 June, Italy ended up defeating West Germany in the semi-finals), including Vincenzo, who ends up meeting his girlfriend Tanja there. As Giulietta returns home, she is met by Vincenzo, telling her that Enzo was hospitalized. They rush to the hospital, where they find out that Enzo was involved in an accident and one of his co-workers was killed.

Three years, later, in 1973, Enzo can't find work and now wants to again return to Italy, however, Giulietta, having created a professional foothold for herself with her sewing work, and continues the affair with Alexander. Giulietta and Enzo then visit Alexander in his office, where he offers a job for Enzo. However, Enzo suspects Alexander is not doing it for his sake and leaves. Giulietta runs after him, and he tells her that he is infertile and Alexander must be Vincenzo's father. Giulietta is shocked that Enzo knew the truth from the beginning and played the charade for many years, Enzo then demands that Giulietta never see Alexander again. Giulietta later visits Alexander in his office, telling him she wants to divorce Enzo (divorce was just legalized in Italy in 1971 and would later be upheld in a 1974 referendum) to live with him. Marianne also suspects Alexander wants to leave her. In July 1973 (Giulietta's death date is marked as 23 July 1973 on her grave seen later), Alexander and Giulietta meet and set off for Venice in a red Alfa Romeo convertible. However, as they drive on the narrow Alpine serpentine road, finally experiencing perfect happiness after a long time, they don't know that the vehicle's brake line is loose and the fluid is leaking.

Back to 2018, Julia wants to know why Vincenzo abandoned her as a child. He finally agrees to tell her the truth and takes her on a trip back to Munich across the Alps to meet up with Alexander, on the exact same route his parents travelled on 45 years earlier.

=== Episode 3: Il segreto – das Geheimnis (The Secret) ===
In 1973 on the Alpine road, Giulietta can't brake the vehicle and she and Alexander drive into the abyss. Alexander was thrown out of the car in process, while she died on the scene. Back in 2018, Vincenzo tells Julia that Giulietta's diary was given to him back in 1973 by the police in the Munich apartment, having found it at the crash scene. Also Enzo was arrested, suspected of having had a motive for the attack, especially with him being a skilled car mechanic. At the trial, however, Enzo is acquitted for a lack of evidence. Vincenzo, who at the break at the trial saw Alexander with his wife embracing, later confronts him at his home.

By 1975, Vincenzo (Kostja Ullmann as a young adult) has become completely unstable and has slipped into Red Army Faction environment with his girlfriend Tanja (Marleen Lohse as a young adult).To show off to her, they break into Alexander's home garage and end up stealing one of the cars there. When Alexander hears the noise and tries to confront them with a poker, Vincenzo pulls a gun on him, but can't bring himself to shoot him, instead escaping in the car, almost running him over. After they have a fight with their comrade Olaf (Ulrich Brandhoff) in a parking garage, Vincenzo and Tanja make love in their apartment. However, as it is being raided by the police, they escape through the window, clad only in their underwear, and flee to Vincenzo's grandmother's home in Sicily. Tanja, wanting to still fight for the "world revolution", seeks contacts with Red Brigades. They briefly enjoy life in Sicily, but one day, while Vincenzo wants to make a life in Italy, Tanja doesn't want a bourgeois life with home and children, and leaves him, travelling to Palermo to meet up with the Red Brigades. Vincenzo doesn't know that Tanja is pregnant with his child.

One year later in 1976, Vincenzo sees in a bar a Targa Florio race and from thereon, gets involved in auto racing and becomes a mechanic in a garage. While there, he becomes romantically involved with Carmela (Lucie Aron). One day, Vincenzo get a call from uncle Giovanni in Munich, who has seen a pregnant Tanja. Vincenzo starts driving back to Germany, despite knowing that the police are looking for him. At the border with Austria, Vincenzo is arrested as he tries to flee. At a trial in Germany, Vincenzo assumes the blame for everything so Tanja, the mother of his child, doesn't have to go to jail. He is then sentenced to seven years' imprisonment. In 1977, Tanja brings their daughter Julia to meet him in jail. Meanwhile, Alexander's car is returned to him. In 1979, at prison, Tanja brings Vincenzo in prison an acorn stick figure that Julia made at preschool, while Vincenzo is taking a college course in prison. In his jail cell, Vincenzo plants the acorn in a flower pot, over time the oak starts to grow. In 1982, Vincenzo is finally released from prison, taking the oak with him, alongside a gravity racer for Julia. A home video from that time then shows Vincenzo, Tanja and Julia in the Munich Olympiapark, playing with the gravity racer, and planting the oak tree Vincenzo brought with him from prison. Back in 2018, in Julia's Munich apartment, Tanja arrives to bring Julia the letter she had saved, and sees Vincenzo again, and they finally talk things out. Vincenzo then tells Julia why he abandoned her 36 years ago.

In 1982, after Vincenzo's release, he, Tanja and Julia come to Tanja's office of Munich's alternative city magazine Blatt. After Vincenzo leaves the office, he saw another man, Bernd (Johannes Zirner) walk in and kiss Tanja and embrace Julia, causing him to lose it and rush back inside. Vincenzo and Bernd end up fighting, in a scene similar to the flashback Julia experienced in the first episode. Vincenzo then returns to Sicily and starts competing in Targa Florio Rally next year. In 1986, he wins the rally and lays the laurel wreath on his mother's grave. In the meantime, Tanja had told Julia that Vincenzo had died, believing that he did not want to know anything more about her and therefore had not contacted her.

Back in 2018, Vincenzo faces his last challenge, visiting Alexander in hospital with Julia. Alexander then explains that his late wife Marlena had confessed on her deathbed that she had manipulated the car he and Giulietta were travelling in back in 1973. Vincenzo also seeks out Enzo (played by Walter Hess as an old man) in a park and apologizes to him for having blamed him for Giulietta's death 45 years ago. They embrace, and Enzo agrees to accompany Vincenzo on his return trip to Italy. Meanwhile, Julia is preparing for another fashion show, having now added another red dress to her collection, which she says is meaningful to her as an evolution of her grandmother's old red dress. Her demonstration is a success.

One year later, in 2019, Julia now has her own small fashion house, and is celebrating her grand-uncle Giovanni's 85th birthday. The series concludes with Julia and her father Vincenzo sitting down under the oak tree in Olympiapark they planted back in 1982.
