= The Cloud (2006 film) =

- Poster
- Directed by: Gregor Schnitzler
- Written by: Marco Kreuzpaintner
- Based on: Die Wolke by Gudrun Pausewang
- Produced by: Markus Zimmer and Sandeep Singh
- Starring: Paula Kalenberg; Franz Dinda
- Release date: 16 March 2006
- Running time: 105 minutes
- Country: Germany
- Language: German

The Cloud (German: Die Wolke), is a 2006 German science fiction thriller drama film based on the 1987 novel Die Wolke by Gudrun Pausewang.

== Plot ==
Due to a malfunction in the fictitious nuclear power plant Markt Ebersberg near Schweinfurt, Bavaria, an MCA occurs and the whole area is evacuated extensively by the authorities. Hannah's school is also located in the affected area. She has to take care of her younger brother on this day since the mother is in Schweinfurt because of business matters; exactly where the disaster has occurred. Since there is no other way to get home to the East Hessian town of Schlitz, where her little brother Uli is already waiting for her, Hannah accepts the offer of her classmate Lars and lets herself be driven home by him and his friends. During the trip, the teenagers learn about the events on the radio, but they do not really understand - until they arrive in Schlitz, where Lars' mother drags him out of the car and tells the others that her son can not take them with him because he has to flee with his family.

Hannah finally goes home on foot, where Uli is already waiting for her. Since their mother is at a cosmetics congress, the two children are on their own. As recommended by the emergency management, the children want to go to the cellar for protection, while all neighbors are already fleeing. There, Hannah wants to wait with her younger brother for Elmar, a schoolmate from whom she got a kiss shortly before the alarm and who has promised her help in the escape. In the midst of the panic, the two finally receive a call from their mother: she does not want the children to go to the cellar, because the radiation reaches them there, but flee to Bad Hersfeld with the neighbors, from where they take the train to Aunt Helga in Hamburg. But since all the neighbors have already fled and Elmar has not appeared (he grapples with the car at home, wants to hot-wire it because he can not find the car keys of his parents), the children decide to go to Bad Hersfeld by bike alone. Uli is killed in a hit-and-run on the way there.

A little later, a family with several children takes Hannah to the Bad Hersfeld station after the family's father places Uli's body in a nearby cornfield. Since the motorways are crowded, many others want to flee with the trains, so Hannah has to pay attention to the little daughters of the family on the platform since the parents still have to fight their way through. Hannah however discovers her friend Elmar during the human masses and runs in his direction - but does not reach him. The couple who took Hannah to know where their children were, who she left behind in search of Elmar, but because she is still in shock, she does not reply. While the father finally finds the children, Hannah leaves the train station as if in a trance and enters the emptied station forecourt, where a few seconds later, the cloud burst happens. Hannah walks into the fallout and collapses shortly afterward. She wakes up in a hospital near Hamburg. Beside her is Ayşe, a girl of the same age, with whom she makes friends. Hannah feels tired and sick; shortly afterward she suffers from hair loss. A little later, Elmar comes to the hospital because he has found Hannah in a tracing file and wants to see her. Elmar is also contaminated, but his health is apparently much better than Hannah's.

A month later, Aunt Helga comes to pick up Hannah. She tells her that her mother is dead, and not missed like she'd been told in the hospital all the time. In Hamburg, where Aunt Helga lives, Hannah goes back to school but remains isolated there because her radiation damage is too obvious because of her baldness and the people avoid her. Only Elmar, whose family also escaped to Hamburg, keeps to her. Elmar's parents want to go to America with their son, but he refuses because he thinks he has no chance and will soon die from the radiation. He lets himself be admitted to the hospital like Hannah finds out from Ayşe, who is also treated there. Hannah wants to see her friend; she finds him just at the moment he wants to commit suicide, but can stop him at the last minute. When the (least-radiated) Zone 3, in which Hannah's hometown is located, is opened, she goes there with Elmar, mainly to bury her brother. After they have buried Uli in the cornfield, the two continue the journey to Schlitz. Elmar says he feels a fluff on Hannah's bald head, and Hannah sticks her head out of the sunroof of the car "to let her hair fly in the wind".

== Cast ==
- Paula Kalenberg as Hannah Meinecke
- Franz Dinda as Elmar Koch
- Hans-Laurin Beyerling as Uli
- Karl Kranzkowski as Dr. Salamander
- Richy Müller as Albert Koch
- Carina Wiese as Paula Meinecke
- Gabriela Maria Schmeide as Helga
