= Paula Kalenberg =

German actress (born 1986)

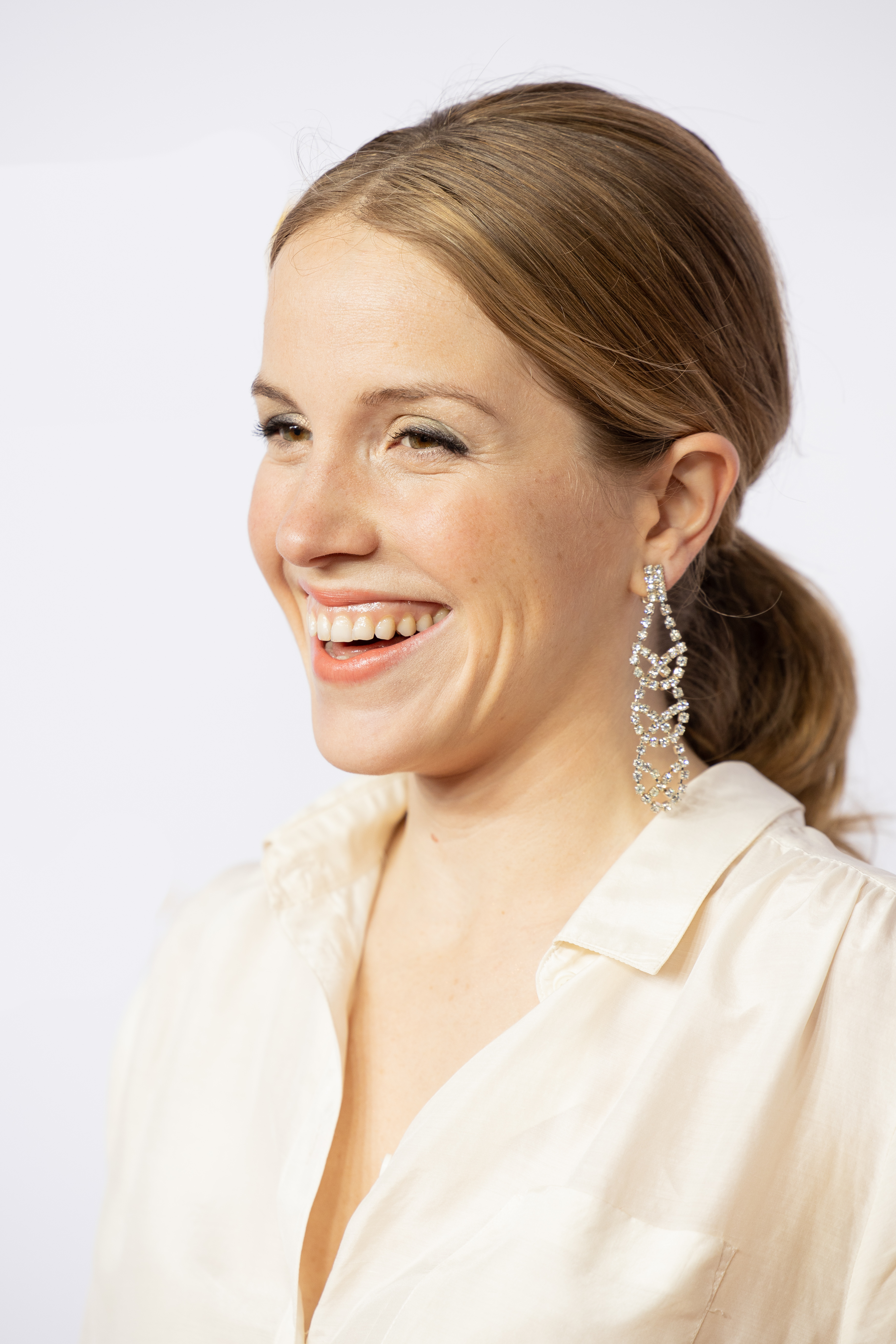
- Paula Kalenberg at the 2020 Berlin International Film Festival.
- Born: Paula Kalenberg; 9 November 1986 (age 39); Dinslaken, West-Germany
- Occupation: Actress
- Years active: 2001-present

Paula Kalenberg (born 9 November 1986) is a German actress. She is probably best-known to international audiences for her roles in films Krabat, Vision - From the Life of Hildegard von Bingen, and Jew Suss: Rise and Fall.

== Career ==
Kalenberg began her career in 2001, after hearing about a casting on the radio. She appeared in two television films, Hanna - Where Are You? (Hanna - Wo bist Du?) in 2001, and In the End the Truth (Am Ende die Wahrheit) in 2002. In 2003, apart from appearing in television series Vice Squad (Die Sitte) and Tatort (Tatort), Kalenberg also made her film debut, in drama The Puppet Grave Digger (Der Puppengräber). Throughout 2004 and 2005, she acted in four television-films - The Doctor (Die Ärztin), The Sting of Scorpion (Der Stich des Skorpion), Secret of the Red House (Das Geheimnis des roten Hauses) and Intrigue and Love (Kabale und Liebe). In Intrigue and Love, Kalenberg starred as Luise Miller, opposite famous German actor August Diehl.

In 2006, Kalenberg starred film The Cloud, based on the novel Die Wolke, for which she won the New Faces Award for Best Actress. She then starred the 2007 drama Nothing Else Matters (Was am Ende zählt). In 2008, Kalenberg appeared in various projects on television and film, the most notably fantasy film Krabat, opposite David Kross and Daniel Brühl, and mini-series Rosamunde Pilcher - The Four Seasons (Rosamunde Pilcher - Die vier Jahreszeiten). The following year, she starred two short and two full-length films, A Song Sleeps in All Things (Schläft ein Lied in allen Dingen) and Vision - From the Life of Hildegard von Bingen (Vision - Aus dem Leben der Hildegard von Binge). The later one earned her Lilli Palmer Memorial Camera at the 2009 Golden Camera Awards ceremony.

In 2010, Kalenberg portrayed Kristina Söderbaum in film Jew Suss: Rise and Fall, winning Askania Award for Shooting Star. In 2011, she made episode appearances of television series Countdown - The Haunt begins (Countdown - Die Jagd beginnt) and Wilsberg, and acted in film Adam's End (Adams Ende). It was announced Kalenberg would star a new television film, Löwenstein, which is expected to be released in 2012.

== Personal life ==
Kalenberg was born in Dinslaken, near Düsseldorf, currently she lives in Berlin. She named Mata Hari as the role she would like to play.

== Filmography ==
Year	Title	Original Title	Role	Notes
2001	Hanna - Where are ou?	Hanna - Wo bist Du?	Hanna Storm	(TV Film)
2002	In the End the Truth	Am Ende die Wahrheit	Luzie Rietmann	(TV Film)
2003	Vice Squad	Die Sitte	Tina Peters	(TV Series) 1 episode
2003	Crime Scene	Tatort	Winifred "Winnie" Sylvester	(TV Series) 1 episode
2003	The Puppet Grave Digger	Der Puppengräber	Film	Tanja Schlösser
2004	The Doctor	Die Ärztin	Laila Röhler	(TV Film)
2004	The Sting of the Scorpion	Der Stich des Skorpion	Young Nathalie Stein	(TV Film)
2005	Secret of the red House	Das Geheimnis des roten Hauses	Hella von Plessen	(TV Film)
2005	Intrigue and Love	Kabale und Liebe	Luise Miller	(TV Film)
2006	The Cloud	Die Wolke	Hannah	New Faces Award for Best Actress
2007	Nothing Else Matters	Was am Ende zählt	Carla	
2008	Bloch	Bloch	Sina	(TV Series) 1 episode
2008	From Breathing under Water	Vom Atmen unter Wasser	Elena Bartelt	(TV Film)
2008	The Duo	Das Duo	Jule Mundorf	(TV Series)
2008	Krabat	Krabat	Kantorka	
2008	A Year ago in Winter	Im Winter ein Jahr	Stella	
2008	Rosamunde Pilcher - The Four Seasons	Rosamunde Pilcher - Die vier Jahreszeiten	Abigail "Abby" Combe	(Mini Series) (2008–09) 4 episodes
2009	The Prince	Der Prinz	Kristin	(Short Film)
2009	A Song Sleeps in All Things	Schläft ein Lied in allen Dingen	Maggie	
2009	Vision - From the Life of Hildegard von Bingen	Vision - Aus dem Leben der Hildegard von Bingen	Klara	Golden Lilli Palmer Memorial Camera
2009	Soltau	Soltau	Marie	(Short Film)
2010	Jew Suss: Rise and Fall	Jud Süß - Film ohne Gewissen	Kristina Söderbaum	Askania Award for Shooting Star
2011	Adam's End	Adams Ende	Carmen	
2011	Countdown - The Hunt Begins	Countdown - Die Jagd beginnt	Sonja Reichenbach	(TV Series) 1 episode
2011	Wilsberg	Wilsberg	Angela Rothern	(TV Series) 1 episode
2012	Löwenstein	Löwenstein	Stella	(TV Film) Pre-production
2013	Kokowääh 2	Kokowääh 2		
2013	When Inge Is Dancing	Systemfehler - Wenn Inge tanzt	Inge	
2015	Starfighter	Starfighter - Sie wollten den Himmel erobern	Evi Kranz	(TV Film)
2021	The Last Execution	Nahschuss	Klara	
2021	The Four of Us	Du Sie Er & Wir	Maria	

== Awards and nominations ==
Year	Award	Category	Project	Result
2006	New Faces Award	Best Actress	The Cloud	Won
2009	Golden Camera Award	Lilli Palmer Memorial Camera	Vision - From the Life of Hildegard von Bingen	Won
2011	Askania Award	Shooting Star	Jew Suss: Rise and Fall	Won
