= 80 Minutes =

2008 film

- Film poster
- Directed by: Thomas Jahn
- Screenplay by: Thomas Jahn
- Produced by: Michael Souvignier; Ica Souvignier; Rolant Hergert
- Starring: Gabriel Mann; Natalia Avelon
- Cinematography: Henning Jessel
- Edited by: Thomas Jahn
- Music by: Boris Salchow
- Production companies: Zeitsprung Film Collection; American Cinema International
- Distributed by: Well Go (US); VVS Films (Canada)
- Release dates: 6 June 2008 (Japan); 18 February 2010 (Germany)
- Running time: 80 minutes
- Country: Germany
- Language: English
- Budget: $4,000,000 (estimated)

80 Minutes is a 2008 German direct-to-video English-language action thriller film written and directed by Thomas Jahn and starring Gabriel Mann, Natalia Avelon, Joshua Dallas, Oliver Kieran-Jones and Francis Fulton-Smith. The film was released direct-to-video on September 2, 2008 in the United States.

== Premise ==
Alex North has been injected with a poison inside his body and has only 80 minutes to find $15,000 for his boss Lloyd if he wants to live. Now he must go through the whole night, searching for ways to make up that amount.

== Cast ==
- Gabriel Mann as Alex North
- Josh Dallas as Floyd
- Oliver Kieran-Jones as Lloyd
- Natalia Avelon as Mona
- Francis Fulton-Smith as Walter
- Jack Murray as Black
- Max Urlacher as Dr. Vincent North
- Xenia Seeberg as Britt
- Terry Cook as Mike
- Niki Greb as Carmen
- Alex Wedekind as Police Officer #1
- Johannes Brandrup as Police Officer #2
- Pierre Shrady as Jaguar Driver

== Reception ==
Christopher Armstead called the film "trite".
