= Christoph Letkowski =

German actor (born 1982)

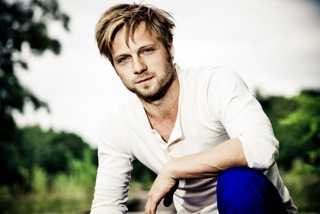
- Letkowski in 2012
- Born: 16 June 1982 (age 43); Halle, East Germany
- Occupation: Actor
- Years active: 2006-present

Christoph Letkowski (born 16 June 1982) is a German actor. He appeared in more than forty films since 2006.

== Selected filmography ==
Year	Title	Role	Notes
2009	Parkour	Richie	
2013	Wetlands		
2016	Fucking Berlin		
2016	Too Hard to Handle		
2019	Bella Germania	young Alexander	3-part miniseries
2020	Lassie Come Home	Hausmeister Hinz	
