= Jew Suss: Rise and Fall =

2010 film

- Film poster
- Directed by: Oskar Roehler
- Written by: Oskar Roehler; Klaus Richter; Michael Esser; Friedrich Knilli; Franz Novotny
- Produced by: Franz Novotny; Markus Zimmer
- Starring: Tobias Moretti; Moritz Bleibtreu; Martina Gedeck
- Cinematography: Carl-Friedrich Koschnick
- Edited by: Bettina Böhler
- Music by: Martin Todsharow
- Release dates: 18 February 2010 (Berlinale); 23 September 2010 (Germany)
- Running time: 100 minutes
- Country: Germany
- Language: German

Jew Suss: Rise and Fall (German title: Jud Süß – Film ohne Gewissen [Süss the Jew – Film Without Conscience]) is a 2010 German historical drama film directed by Oskar Roehler, dramatising the creative process behind the antisemitic Nazi propaganda film Jud Süß (1940). It was nominated for the Golden Bear at the 60th Berlin International Film Festival.

In Germany, the film premiered at the Berlin Film Festival and received mixed reviews for its treatment of the controversial source material. Some German critics praised the performance of Tobias Moretti in his role as Ferdinand Marian. In 2011, cinematographer Carl-Friedrich Koschnick received the Austrian Romy award for cinematography.

== Plot ==
When Austrian actor Ferdinand Marian's career is on the rise at the end of the 1930s, he is personally selected by the Propaganda Minister Joseph Goebbels for the title role in the feature film Jud Süß. He at first rejects the offer, but then succumbs to the temptation of becoming famous. Whilst filming under director Veit Harlan, Marian's personality begins to change, which leads to an argument with his Jewish wife, Anna. Jud Süß premieres at the Venice Film Festival at the beginning of September 1940 and opens in German cinemas a few days later. The anti-Semitic propaganda film reaches an audience of millions, and from then on Marian is identified with the role of the threatening-looking Jewish tax officer Joseph Süß Oppenheimer; he receives many offers to act in other films.

Through his involvement with the Reich, Marian becomes aware of the threat behind the National Socialists, which drove many of his professional colleagues into exile. The Jewish actor Wilhelm Adolf Deutscher, hidden in Marian's garden house and disguised as a gardener, is betrayed to his friend Lutz by the domestic servant Britta, with whom Marian apparently had an affair. Marian then takes solace drinking alcohol and cheats on his wife with a Czech woman named Vlasta. Joseph Goebbels deports Anna in order to gain control over Marian, but this causes an opposite effect.

As the Nazi regime falls at the end of the Second World War, Marian is not allowed to resume acting because of his involvement in Jud Süß and the Nazis. At the same time, he sees many of his professional colleagues go into hiding, and he is confronted by the American military. Jud Süß director Veit Harlan insists (only after the fact) that the authorities forced him to make the film. Marian encounters his friend Wilhelm, who survived a Nazi concentration camp, and learns from him that Anna is dead. Marian later discovers that Vlasta is having an affair with a U.S. soldier; this leads him to a breakdown, and he kills himself by crashing his car.

== Historical accuracy ==
In the film, Marian commits suicide by driving his car into a tree at high speed. According to Marian's biographer, Marian did die in his car, but it’s unclear whether the reason was suicide, drunkenness, or something else.

== Cast ==
- Tobias Moretti as Ferdinand Marian
- Moritz Bleibtreu as Joseph Goebbels
- Martina Gedeck as Anna Marian
- Justus von Dohnányi as Veit Harlan
- Heribert Sasse as Wilhelm Adolf Deutscher
- Martin Feifel as Knauf
- Anna Unterberger as Britta
- Milan Peschel as Werner Krauss
- Armin Rohde as Heinrich George
- Paula Kalenberg as Kristina Söderbaum
- Erika Marozsán as Vlasta
- Ralf Bauer as Fritz Hippler
- Robert Stadlober as Lutz
- Martin Butzke as Malte Jäger
- Rolf Zacher as Erich Engel
- Waldemar Kobus as Eberhard Frowein
- Lena Reichmuth as Magda Goebbels
- Johannes Silberschneider as Hans Moser

== Reception ==
On the review aggregator website Rotten Tomatoes, the film has an approval rating of 56%.

Kate Connolly of The Guardian wrote of the film's mixed-to-negative reception upon its premiere, " In the films most criticized scene... high society is embodied by an SS officer's wife who insists on having rough sex with Marian as they lean out of a window, as Berlin burns around them. It produced hisses, boos, and sniggers from the Berlinale audience. Rohler's decision to change major historical details have also come under fire... But it is Bleibtreu's exaggerated, cartoon cut-out portrayal of Goebbels that has received the most negative reactions. The actor has sought to defend himself, saying: "this guy was a clown. From today's viewpoint, it's inexplicable how many millions could have fallen into their trap."
