= Jaqen H'ghar =

Character in A Song of Ice and Fire

- A Song of Ice and Fire character Game of Thrones character
- Tom Wlaschiha as Jaqen H'ghar in Game of Thrones
- First appearance: Literature: A Clash of Kings (1998); Television: "Fire and Blood" (2011)
- Last appearance: Television: "No One" (2016)
- Created by: George R. R. Martin
- Adapted by: D.B. Weiss & David Benioff (Game of Thrones)
- Portrayed by: Tom Wlaschiha

In-universe information
- Gender: Male
- Occupation: Assassin

Jaqen H'ghar is a fictional character in American author George R. R. Martin's A Song of Ice and Fire epic fantasy novel series.

Introduced in 1998's A Clash of Kings, Jaqen is a mysterious assassin belonging to the order of Faceless Men from Braavos. Members of the order use multiple identities and can change their looks at will, so Jaqen's real name and appearance is not known. However, under the name "Jaqen H'ghar" he appears to be a young man with long hair that is red on one side and white on the other. His most distinctive feature is his tendency to refer to himself in the third person as "a man", also referring to his interlocutors in similar fashion (for instance, instead of "I thank you" he would say "a man thanks a girl").

Jaqen is portrayed by the German actor Tom Wlaschiha in HBO's multi-Emmy-winning television adaptation Game of Thrones. For his portrayal, Wlaschiha was nominated for Outstanding Performance by an Ensemble in a Drama Series by the Screen Actors Guild Awards in 2016.

== Storylines ==
=== Novels ===
==== A Clash of Kings ====
Jaqen is first introduced as a prisoner from the black cells of the Red Keep, given to Yoren's convoy to join the Night's Watch. Along with two other prisoners, he is rescued by Arya Stark.

At Harrenhal, Arya encounters him again, now under the employ of the Lannisters, and he offers to let her kill any three people she names, whereupon she names two people who hurt her at Harrenhal. When Jaqen asks her to name the last target, Arya extorts him to help her free Northern prisoners by naming Jaqen himself as the third person. In order to get Arya to retract the name, Jaqen stages a massive prison riot that overwhelms the Lannister garrison. Afterwards, Jaqen offers to take Arya with him, but Arya expresses a wish to go home; he gives Arya a strange Braavosi iron coin to ensure her induction into his guild, the Faceless Men, and tells her to remember the passphrase "valar morghulis" ('all men must die' in High Valyrian) before leaving.

=== Television series ===
Jaqen H'ghar is portrayed by German actor Tom Wlaschiha in the television adaptation of the book series.

==== Season 1 ====
While traveling with Yoren, posing as a boy recruit for the Night's Watch, Arya glimpses Jaqen among Yoren's prisoners kept in a cage.

==== Season 2 ====
When Yoren's group is attacked by the forces of Ser Amory Lorch, the cage catches fire, and Arya rescues Jaqen along with two other prisoners. Although he is thankful to Arya, he refuses to fight against Ser Amory's men. Later on, he reappears in Harrenhal, this time dressed in a Lannister uniform, and asks Arya to name three people whom he should kill. Arya names the torturer known as "the Tickler" and, later on, Ser Amory himself. Arya's third request is to help her and her friends escape from captivity; Jaqen initially refuses, but then agrees when Arya offers him to kill himself as an alternative. Having staged the escape, he once again meets with Arya and offers to take her to Braavos, where she could join the order of Faceless Men. Arya declines, saying she has to find her family, and Jaqen hands her a coin, saying that if she ever wanted to accept the offer, she could show the coin to a Braavosi and recite the words "valar morghulis".

==== Season 5 ====
Upon Arya's arrival at the Temple of the Many-Faced God, Jaqen, along with the Waif (another member of the Faceless), becomes her mentor and trains her to become "no one" (i.e., to resign her sense of self in order to become one of the Faceless). He shows her the "faces" used by the Order (i.e., masks made out of faces of people who died at the hands of the Faceless or came to the Temple to be euthanized). Jaqen gives Arya her first assignment to assassinate a person known as "the thin man". When Arya refuses and instead kills Meryn Trant, Jaqen tells her Trant's life was not hers to take, and a debt must be paid. He then drinks a vial of poison and seemingly dies. But the Waif, who now wears Jaqen's face, tells Arya that the dead person is not Jaqen; upon removing all the faces from the person on the floor, Arya sees her own face and becomes blind.

==== Season 6 ====
While Arya lives as a blind beggar on the streets of Braavos, Jaqen approaches her several times, telling her her eyesight will return if she tells him her name, but Arya insists she is "no one". He calls for her to drink from the fountain at the Temple, after which she regains her eyesight and receives another mission: namely, to kill Lady Crane, a theater actress. When Arya instead prevents the assassination, he permits the Waif to murder Arya. However, after Arya instead kills the Waif, he is seemingly pleased with her, telling her that she has indeed become "no one". Nonetheless, Arya chooses to leave the temple and part ways with Jaqen.

== Characterization and reception ==
Tom Wlaschiha compared Jaqen to an acting teacher: "To me, in a practical sense, it is like Jaqen is saying to Arya, "Become the perfect actor"... For her to be able to take on a whole different persona, and not be recognizable, in order to get ahead with what she wants. That's what actors try to do." He also stated that his favourite part about playing the character was that "he has a big secret. You can really play with that fact that you're hiding things, that you're always literally putting on a different face. I like his magic ability, although we'll find out that they're not that magical at all. He's just very skilled". When learning to speak in Jaqen's peculiar way, Wlasichiha drew inspiration from Winnetou, a Native American character very popular in Germany who also referred to himself in the third person.

Hans Van Eyghen, a Dutch philosopher of religion, drew parallels between the faith of the Faceless Men and Vedanta, and compared Jaqen to a guru who has managed to let go of one's self and identify with Brahman, and helps a new adept do the same. Ryan Mitchell Wittingslow, associate professor of philosophy at the University of Groningen, described the personal philosophy of Jaqen (and other adepts of the Many-Faced God) as a form of fatalism, acceptance of fate, and denial of free will: namely, he was willing to accept his death (along with the death of two fellow prisoners) as something that was fated, and when Arya rescued him, he had to kill three other people to make up for it.

For his performance in the series Wlaschiha was nominated for Outstanding Performance by an Ensemble in a Drama Series by the Screen Actors Guild Awards in 2016.
