= Der Ermittler =

German television series

- Genre: Crime Drama
- Starring: Oliver Stokowski (Paul Zorn); Joanne Gläsel (Eva Klaussner); Nele Rosetz (Dr. Tina Jaeger); Patrick Rapold (Tim Rasch); Rainer Luxem (Henning Peters); Carina Wiese (Carola Zorn); Charlotte Bellmann Hanna Zorn)
- Country of origin: Germany
- Original language: German
- No. of seasons: 5
- No. of episodes: 29

Production
- Running time: 60 minutes
- Production company: Monaco Film GmbH

Original release
- Network: ZDF
- Release: 16 March 2001 – 19 July 2005

Der Ermittler is a German television series set in Hamburg, featuring a team of investigators led by Chief Inspector Paul Zorn. His colleague Eva Klaussner and their superior, Director of Criminal Investigation Henning Peters from the Hamburg homicide squad, were also part of the team. In the 2004 season, forensic pathologist Dr. Tina Jaeger and trainee detective inspector Tim Rasch joined the group.

Writers of the individual episodes received contributions from authors including Eva and Volker A. Zahn, Johannes Dräxler, Remy Eyssen, and Eva and Horst Kummeth.

To ensure a diverse range of perspectives, various directors were involved in the creation of different episodes.

The series consisted of a total of five seasons, each comprising six episodes, except for the final season which had five episodes. These episodes were produced and aired on ZDF.

== See also ==
- List of German television series
