= Circle of Life (TV series) =

- Starring: Francis Fulton-Smith
- Country of origin: Germany
- No. of seasons: 9
- No. of episodes: 129

Original release
- Network: Das Erste
- Release: 2004 – 2020

Familie Dr. Kleist is a German television series about a German doctor named Christian Kleist and his family, internationally also known as Circle of Life.

Familie Dr. Kleist stars Francis Fulton-Smith in the title role, which has been broadcast on the public broadcaster Das Erste since 13 April 2004. The Polyphonic film and television company produces the series on behalf of ARD advertising and the ARD. The first five seasons, which in the main evening program were broadcast, each consisting of 13 sequences. Since the sixth season, the sixteen-episode seasons have been broadcast on the evening program. The ninth and final season has been broadcasting since September 2019.

== See also ==
- List of German television series
