= Die Wolke =

1987 novel by Gudrun Pausewang

- Author: Gudrun Pausewang
- Language: German
- Genre: Novel, Young adult literature
- Published: 1987
- Publisher: Ravensburger
- Awards: Deutscher Jugendliteraturpreis; Kurd Laßwitz Award; Deutscher Science Fiction Preis
- ISBN: 978-3-473-35086-5

Fall-Out
- Translator: Patricia Crampton
- Published: 1995
- Publisher: Viking

Die Wolke (lit. '"The Cloud"') is a German novel for young adults by German author Gudrun Pausewang, published in 1987. The story was written after the 1986 Chernobyl nuclear disaster in the Soviet Union (now Ukraine), with a 14-year-old girl having to deal with the consequences of a fictional similar disaster in Germany. It was translated into English by Patricia Crampton, published in 1997, as Fall-Out. Die Wolke, which received several awards, became a popular book for reading in class and was adapted for film and stage, has been regarded as Pausewang's signature work.

The book has been credited with shaping opposition to nuclear power in Germany.

== History ==
Pausewang wrote the novel Die Wolke in 1987, after the Chernobyl disaster when nuclear fallout rained down on much of Europe. She used information that the organisation "Ärzte gegen den Atomtod" (Physicians against nuclear death) had published at the end of the 1970s.

The novel was adapted as a film in 2006.

Pausewang wrote in 2011, after the Fukushima nuclear disaster, that she was determined to take her readers seriously regardless of age, and she wanted to warn of dangers of her time. Sales of Die Wolke surged again on that occasion.

== Awards ==
In 1988, the book was awarded the Deutscher Jugendliteraturpreis, the Kurd Laßwitz Award and the Deutscher Science Fiction Preis in the category Best Novel. It soon became part of reading curriculum in many schools in Germany.

== Plot ==
The story deals with a Chernobyl-type nuclear disaster happening on German soil. The heroine of the story is a fourteen-year-old girl who flees the contaminating cloud of radiation and experiences the ensuing breakdown of social order.

The story begins at school where Janna-Berta and the other students and teachers are alarmed of a nuclear accident in the vicinity. She returns home. Her younger brother Uli is alone because their parents are away and their grandparents are on vacation. Together, they flee by bicycle, because all of their neighbours have already left. As they travel, they experience chaos on the roads they bike. Uli collapses with his bicycle and is run over by a car and killed. Janna-Berta, in shock, is taken to the station in Bad Hersfeld. She wants to return to her brother to bury him, is contaminated by radiation, and collapses.

She wakes up in a provisional hospital in Herleshausen, where she witnesses the hardships of others. She learns of the extent of the disaster from television and a nurse. Her hair falls out. She makes a friend, Ayse, who later dies from radiation poisoning. Her aunt from Hamburg finds her and tells her that her parents and youngest brother, who had been with them, are dead. The news was intended to be kept secret.

Janna-Berta stays with an aunt, who is not responsive to the girl's needs and wants to return to normality as soon as possible. She moves to another aunt, Almut, who shows solidarity with the victims. When her hometown is no longer in an exclusion zone, she returns. On the way, she finds her brother's body and buries it. She also finds her grandparents at home. They have just returned from their vacation and cannot believe what has happened until she tells them the shocking truth.

== Editions ==
Die Wolke was first published by Maier, Ravensburg, in 1987, in the series Ravensburger junge Reihe (Ravensburg Young Series) ISBN 978-3-473-35086-5. Several editions followed shortly. A paperback version was issued as Ravensburger Taschenbuch in 2006 (ISBN 978-3-473-58240-2), and a Jubiläumsausgabe (anniversary edition), 25 years after the first edition, in 2012 (ISBN 978-3-473-54401-1).

Die Wolke appeared as an audio book, and an audio play, both versions abbreviated and following the book freely. The audio book was published by Hörbuch Hamburg in 2011 (ISBN 978-3-86742-690-9). The audio play of around 48 minutes was published by Der Audio Verlag in 2012, (ISBN 978-3-86231-130-9).

== Film ==
Die Wolke was adapted as a film in 2006, directed by Gregor Schnitzler in the style of a disaster film. While the initial panic after the disaster is similar, the action is later focused on the relationship of two young people, Hannah (age 16 in the film, and played by Paula Kalenberg) and Elmar (played by Franz Dinda).

== Translations ==
Die Wolke was translated into English by Patricia Crampton and published in 1997 by Viking under the title Fall-Out.

In 2014, a stage adaptation in Japan, titled Mienai Kumo (Invisible Clouds), was written by Misaki Setoyama.
