= The Final Game (1998 film) =

1998 film

- Written by: Sven Burgemeister
- Directed by: Sigi Rothemund
- Starring: Francis Fulton-Smith; Christoph Waltz; Thure Riefenstein
- Music by: Dominic Roth
- Country of origin: Germany
- Original language: German

Production
- Producers: Timo Berndt; Borris Brandt
- Cinematography: Dragan Rogulj
- Editor: Andreas Herzog
- Running time: 93 minutes
- Production companies: TV-60 Filmproduktion; Pro 7; Die Nefzers; Nitro-Film Medienproduktion GmbH

Original release
- Release: 9 June 1998

The Final Game is a 1998 German thriller film directed by Sigi Rothemund. It was written by Timo Berndt and Borris Brandt.

== Plot ==
70,000 football fans have streamed into the Berlin Olympic Stadium to see the final of the DFB-Pokal.

Suddenly the stadium's security center is attacked by armed terrorists who take five people hostage.

A few minutes before the end of the game the gang leader, Kant, orders his men to close and lock all exits from the stadium.

A mass panic ensues among the crowd.

Tobias Bender, the head of stadium security, rises to the challenge.

== Cast ==
- Francis Fulton-Smith as Tobias Bender
- Christoph Waltz as Kant
- Axel Milberg as Deutler
- Nele Mueller-Stöfen as Jacky
- Thure Riefenstein as Flamenco
- Armin Rohde as Harry Andresen
- Andreas Mannkopff
- Marek Wlodarczyk
- Veit Stübner
- Michael Schiller
- Ottokar Lehrner
- Alexander Reed
- Steffen Groth
- Peer Martiny
- Michael Ehnert as SEK-Chef Fischer
- Igor Jeftic
- Nina Rothemund
- Frank Zimmermann as Polizist

== Production ==
Some of the scenes were shot on 1 March 1998 at the Bundesliga match Hertha BSC against Hansa Rostock.

== Release ==
The film premiered on 9 June 1998 as a TV movie on Pro 7 under the German title Das Finale. In Hungary it had a theatrical release on 12 April 2005.
