= Württembergische Landesbühne Esslingen =

Coordinates: 48°44′27″N 9°18′33″E

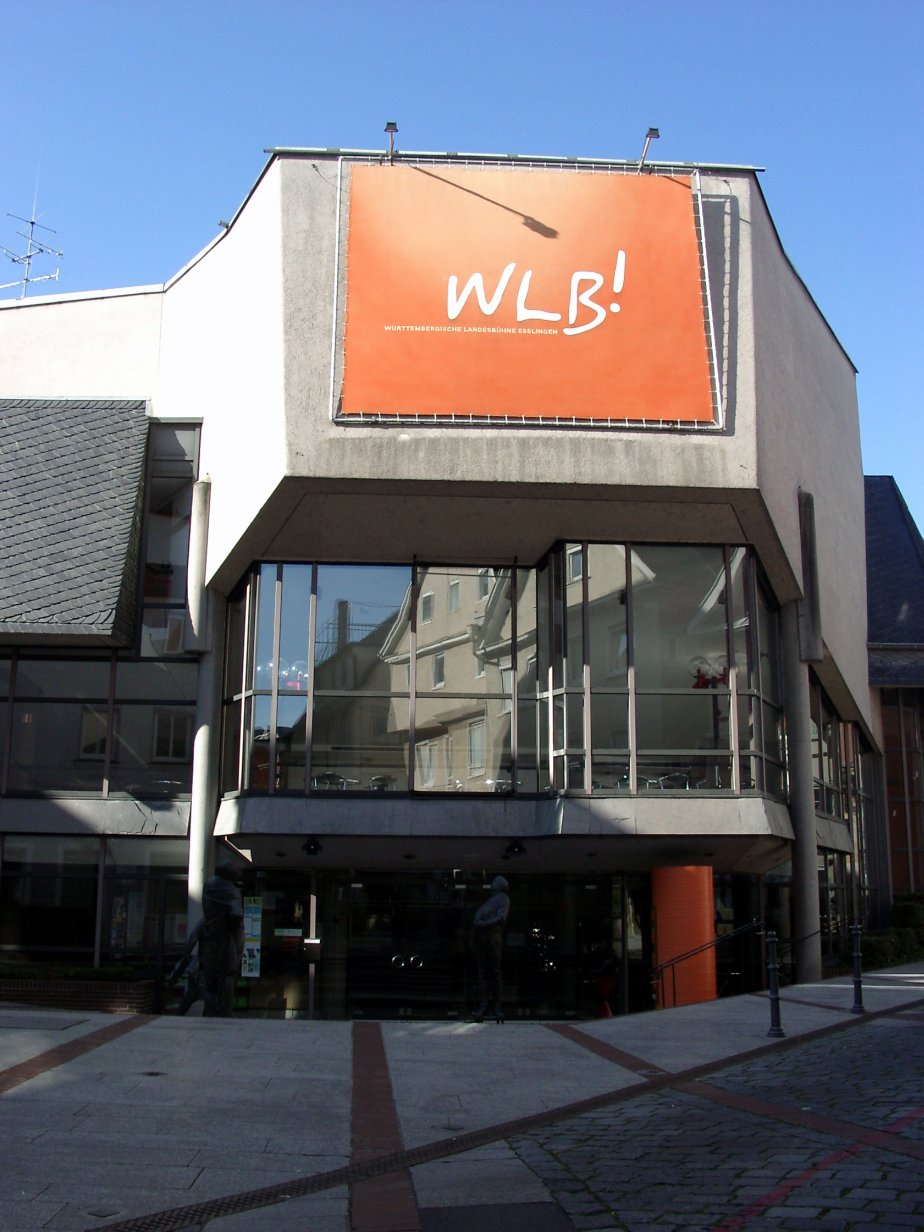
An image of Württembergische Landesbühne Esslingen

The Württembergische Landesbühne Esslingen is a theatre in Esslingen am Neckar, Baden-Württemberg, Germany with a long-standing tradition.

As a state theatre, the WLB is committed to presenting approximately half of its performances outside its main venue, reaching a diverse audience across different regions.

== History ==
Early Theatre Activities in Esslingen The first permanent stage in Esslingen was established in 1804 within the former Aegidienkapelle. In 1864, a new venue was opened in a converted tithe barn, serving as the town's theatre for over 100 years and accommodating 644 spectators. From 1900 to 1925, Mathilde Erfurth managed the theatre, offering a diverse program of operas, operettas, and plays. However, economic difficulties led to its temporary closure in 1925. From the Volksbühne to the Landesbühne In 1919, the Schwäbische Volksbühne was founded as a traveling theatre aimed at bringing performances to rural communities. In 1921, the theatre was renamed the Württembergische Volksbühne. Following the renovation and reopening of Esslingen's municipal theatre in 1926, it became the main venue for the Württembergische Volksbühne, which continued performing in numerous towns. In 1933, the theatre was restructured and became the Württembergische Landesbühne. After closing in 1944 due to the war, the WLB was the first theatre in Germany granted permission to resume performances in 1945.

== Post-War period and modernisation ==
In the decades following the Second World War, various artistic directors shaped the development of the Württembergische Landesbühne. In 1981, a separate section for children's and youth theatre, known as Junge WLB, was established. In 1982, the WLB moved into a new theatre building featuring a large auditorium with 461 seats and several smaller stages. The WLB gained national recognition under Friedrich Schirmer (1985-1989), who introduced world premieres and innovative concepts. In 1998, a citizens' initiative successfully prevented the planned closure of the theatre. Since then, the WLB has continued to strengthen its position as a vital cultural institution.

== The WLB today ==
The Württembergische Landesbühne stages around 20 new productions each season, including classical dramas, contemporary plays, and musical theatre. A highlight of the theatre's program is the annual open-air performances in Esslingen's historic old town. As a regional theatre, the WLB operates not only in Esslingen but also in numerous towns across Baden-Württemberg, Bavaria, Switzerland, and Liechtenstein. More than 100,000 people attend its performances each year, with many children and young people benefiting from the educational programs offered by Junge WLB. In 2019, the WLB celebrated its 100th anniversary with a new production of Friedrich Schiller's Kabale und Liebe. With the start of the 2024/25 season, Marcus Grube has assumed the role of sole director of the Württembergische Landesbühne Esslingen.

== List of Directors ==
Ernst Martin (1919–1922)

Adolf Barth (1922–1924)

Herbert Maisch (1924–1926)

Hans Herbert Michels (1926–1932)

Otto Schwarz (März–Mai 1933)

Gottfried Haaß-Berkow (1933–1953)

Wilhelm List-Diehl (1953–1963)

Joachim von Groeling (1963–1970)

Elert Bode (1970–1976)

Achim Thorwald (1976–1985)

Friedrich Schirmer (1985–1989)

Jürgen Flügge (1989–1993)

Heidemarie Rohweder (1993–1998)

Peter Dolder (1998–2004)

Manuel Soubeyrand (2004–2014)

Friedrich Schirmer (2014–2019)

Friedrich Schirmer and Marcus Grube (2019-2024)

Marcus Grube (since September 2024)
