= Mládek =

Mládek (feminine: Mládková) is a Czech surname. The surname originated from the Old Czech word mládek, which has its root in the adjective mladý ('young') and used to mean 'boy', 'lad'. Notable people with the surname include:

- Ivan Mládek (born 1942), Czech recording artist, composer and comedian
- Ivana Mládková (born 1985), Slovak sprint canoer
- Jan Mládek (born 1960), Czech politician
- Meda Mládková (1919–2022), Czech art collector
