= Unter den Linden – Das Haus Gravenhorst =

German television series

- Starring: Horst Krause
- Country of origin: Germany

Unter den Linden – Das Haus Gravenhorst is a German television series.

== See also ==
- List of German television series
