= The Fifth Commandment (TV series) =

- Starring: Francis Fulton-Smith
- Country of origin: Germany

Ihr Auftrag, Pater Castell ("Your Mission, Father Castell") is a German television series. In the series criminal cases are shown in which the Church and the police have to work together, given a pastor of the Catholic Church in Germany is not allowed to investigate alone. The English title of the series The Fifth Commandment is a translation of the original working title.

== Premise ==
Monsignor Simon Castell is a Jesuit who is specially commissioned by the Vatican to solve criminal cases all over the world, always in connection with the Church. Father Castell therefore has to acquire a wide variety of skills, such as flying aeroplanes, opening locked locks and doors, learning self-defence and even repairing motorbikes.

== Main cast ==
Actor	Role	Episodes (number 1 to 14)	Note
Francis Fulton-Smith	Pater Simon Castell	1–14	
Christine Döring	Marie Blank	1–14	Police commissioner
Hans Peter Hallwachs	Kardinal Scarpia	1–14	
Maja Celiné Probst	Lisa Blank	1–10	Marie's daughter
Lisa Kreuzer	Franziska Blank	1–10	Marie's mother
Anatole Taubman	Dr. Jens Deißmann	1–4	
Ercan Durmaz	Dr. Jens Deißmann	5–14	

== Broadcast ==
To accompany the 1st season, ZDF broadcast 4 so-called webisodes in the channel's own media library, short stories in which the Father's back story is told and how he was trained as a special agent.

Each episode has a duration of 45 min and had 3 seasons (for a total of 14 episodes) between 2008 and 2010.

== Reception ==
The series has been described as very popular and called "James Bond in cassock" by the Frankfurter Allgemeine.

== See also ==
- List of German television series
