= Patricia Crampton =

British translator

- Born: Patricia Elizabeth Cardew Wood; December 12, 1925; Bombay, India
- Died: December 1, 2016 (aged 90)
- Education: St Hugh's College, Oxford
- Occupation: Translator

Patricia Crampton (12 December 1925 – 1 December 2016) was a prize-winning British literary translator, including of children's literature. She studied at Oxford University and served as a translator at the Nuremberg War Crimes Trials. She translated more than 200 children's books and more than 50 adult novels, winning many awards in the process.

== Biography ==
Crampton was born Patricia Elizabeth Cardew Wood in Bombay on 12 December 1925. Her father, John Cardew Wood was a colonel for the Royal Engineers and his mother was Vera Marion, née Kells. Her family returned to England in 1930 and settled in Beaconsfield, where she attended Oakdene School, where she developed a flair for languages. Having learned Hindi and English as a child, Crampton studied German and French at St Hugh's College, Oxford, between 1943 and 1946 and during her lifetime she spoke nine languages.

Upon leaving Oxford, Crampton became a translator and interpreter for the Nuremberg Trials in 1947, at the age of 22. Her role was primarily to translate documents of the Nazi doctors who conducted experiments on the wartime prisoners. She also worked on the translation and interpretation during the IG Farben Trial.

Crampton went on to be a commercial translator, travelling around the world and working for clients such as NATO and British American Tobacco Company. During the 1960s, she started translating children's books, for which she won awards.

On 12 December 1959, she married London Irish Rifles officer Seán Crampton. They lived in Brentford and she spent her later years in Calne, Wiltshire until her death on 1 December 2016.

== Awards and honours ==
In 1984 Crampton was awarded the Schlegel-Tieck Prize for her translation of Marbot by Wolfgang Hildesheimer. She twice won Mildred L. Batchelder Awards for translations of: No Hero for the Kaiser by Rudolph Frank in 1987 and Ronia, the Robber's Daughter by Astrid Lindgren in 1984 In 1996 the Fédération Internationale des Traducteurs Pierre-François Caille Medal was given to Crampton for her services to translation.
