= Gudrun Pausewang =

German writer (1928–2020)

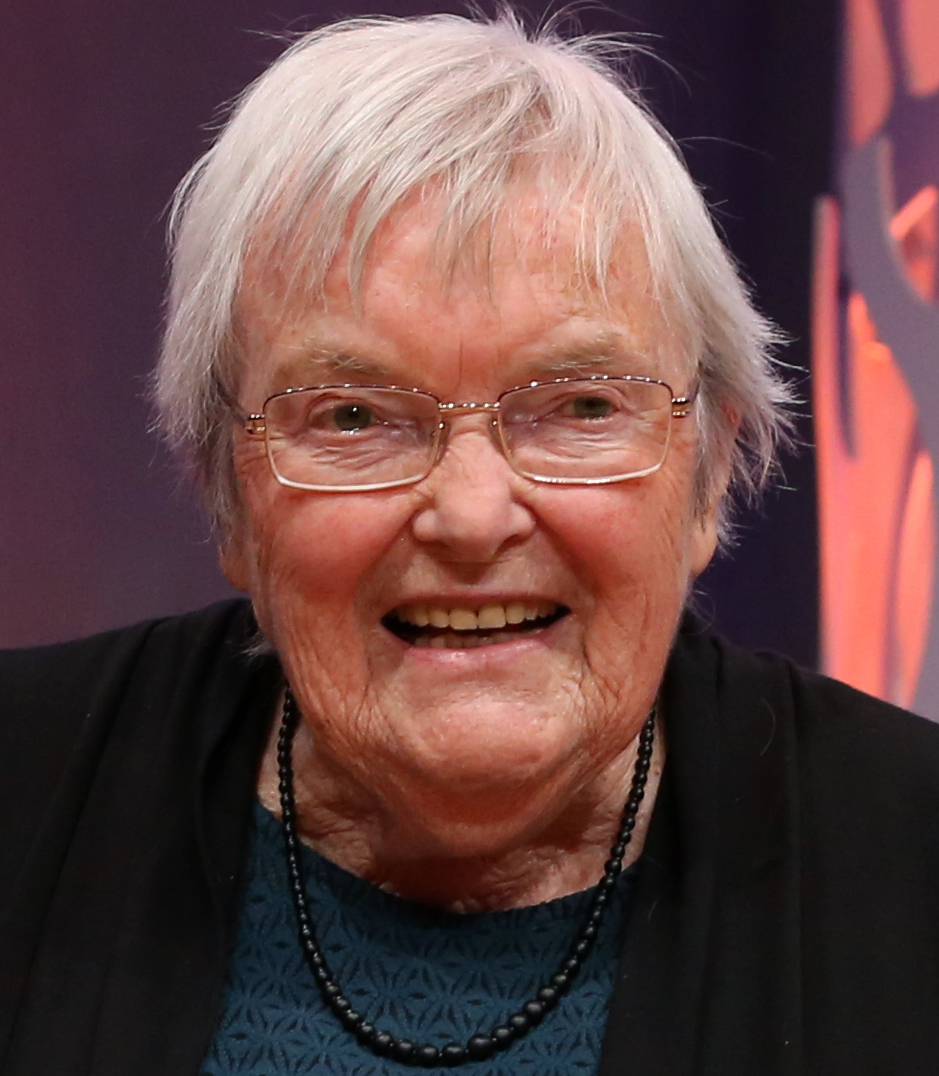
- Gudrun Pausewang in 2017
- Born: 3 March 1928; Mladkov, Czechoslovakia
- Died: 23 January 2020 (aged 91); Baunach, Germany
- Other name: Gudrun Wilcke
- Occupations: Teacher; Science fiction writer; Children's writer; Young adult writer
- Works: The Last Children of Schewenborn; Die Wolke (Fall-Out)
- Awards: Deutscher Jugendliteraturpreis; Kurd-Laßwitz-Preis; Deutscher Science Fiction Preis; Order of Merit of the Federal Republic of Germany

Gudrun Pausewang (3 March 1928 – 23 January 2020), less commonly known by her married name, Gudrun Wilcke, was a German author of children's and young adult literature. She was known for books such as The Last Children of Schewenborn and Die Wolke (The Cloud, published in English under the title Fall-Out) which became part of the German school canon. Her key interests included peace and protection of the environment, and she warned of the alleged dangers of nuclear energy. Her books have been translated into English and received international recognition and awards.

== Biography ==
Pausewang was born in Wichstadtl (now Mladkov), Eastern Bohemia, a member of the German minority in Czechoslovakia. Her father was Siegfried Pausewang, and she was the eldest of six siblings. After the Nazis annexed the area, she became a Jungmädel at age 10 and remained in the organisation until she was 17. Her father died in World War II, and her mother fled with the children to the West, settling in Wiesbaden. Pausewang studied pedagogy and taught in German primary schools (Volksschule), then from 1956 for West Germany's foreign school services in South America, in Chile, Venezuela and Columbia. She returned to West Germany with her son in 1972. She lived in Schlitz, Hesse, where she taught until her retirement in 1989, and where she wrote most of her novels. After her retirement, she achieved her Ph.D. with a dissertation entitled "Vergessene Jugendschriftsteller der Erich-Kästner-Generation" (Forgotten young-adult writers of Erich Kästner's generation).

Pausewang wrote around 100 novels. In 2011, she named as her four main topics:

1. "We should never experience another war" ("Krieg und Frieden")
2. "We should never have another dictatorship" ("Nie mehr Nationalsozialismus")
3. "The poor conditions in South America" ("Armut in Südamerika")
4. "Protecting nature" ("Schutz der Umwelt").

She wrote her novel Die Wolke (literally: The Cloud) in 1987, after the Chernobyl disaster, using information that the organisation "Ärzte gegen den Atomtod" (Physicians against Nuclear Death) had published at the end of the 1970s. In 1988, it was awarded the Deutscher Jugendliteraturpreis, the Kurd Laßwitz Award and the Deutscher Science Fiction Preis in the category Best Novel. It was published in English in 1994 as Fall-Out in a translation by Patricia Crampton. She wrote in 2011, after the Fukushima Daiichi nuclear disaster, that she was determined to take her readers seriously regardless of age, and she wanted to warn readers of the dangers of her time."

Her novel Dark Hours was included in the New York Public Library's 2007 list of Books for the Teen Age Reader, and in the Texas Library Association's 2007–2008 Tayshas High School Reading List. It received the Silver Medal in Juvenile/Young Adult Fiction from the Independent Publisher Book Awards.

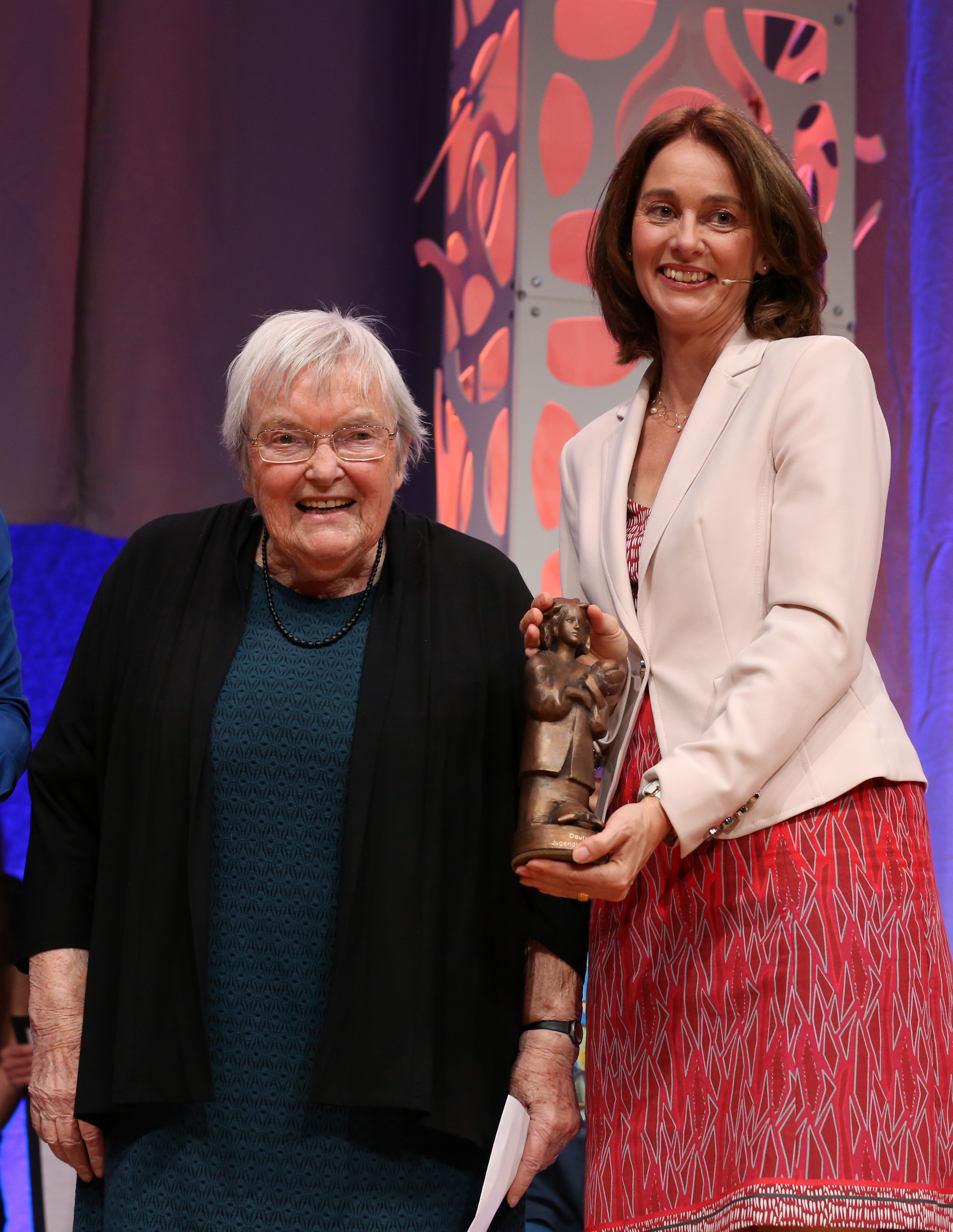
Pausewang with Katarina Barley, then Minister of Family, at the 2017 ceremony Deutscher Jugendliteraturpreis

Pausewang was awarded the Order of Merit of the Federal Republic of Germany. Several schools were named after her, and she received the Deutscher Jugendliteraturpreis for her life's work in 2017. Her books Die Wolke and Die letzten Kinder von Schewenborn became part of required reading in schools, providing a formative and highly ambivalent reading experience shared by many West Germans born in the 1970s and 1980s.

From 2016, she lived in a senior citizens' home in Baunach, where she died on 23 January 2020.

== Publications ==
Publications by Gudrung Pausewang (Gudrun Wilcke) are held by the German National Library, including:

- Die Not der Familie Caldera (1977)
- Auf einem langen Weg (1978)
- Die letzten Kinder von Schewenborn (1983) ISBN 3-473-58007-4
- Die Wolke (1987)
- Fern von der Rosinkawiese (1989)
- Reise im August (1992)
- Der Schlund (Roman, 1993)
- Die Kinder- und Jugendliteratur des Nationalsozialismus als Instrument ideologischer Beeinflussung. Liedertexte – Erzählungen und Romane – Schulbücher – Zeitschriften – Bühnenwerke (2005), published as Gudrun Wilcke

=== Books in English ===
- Fall-Out, a translation of Die Wolke, translated by Patricia Crampton, published by Viking (1994).
- The Final Journey, a translation of Reise im August by Patricia Crampton, published by Viking and Puffin Books.
- Traitor, translated by Rachel Ward, published by Lerner Publishing Group.
- Dark Hours, translated by John Brownjohn, published in America through Annick Press (2006).
