= Krabat =

Sorbian folklore character

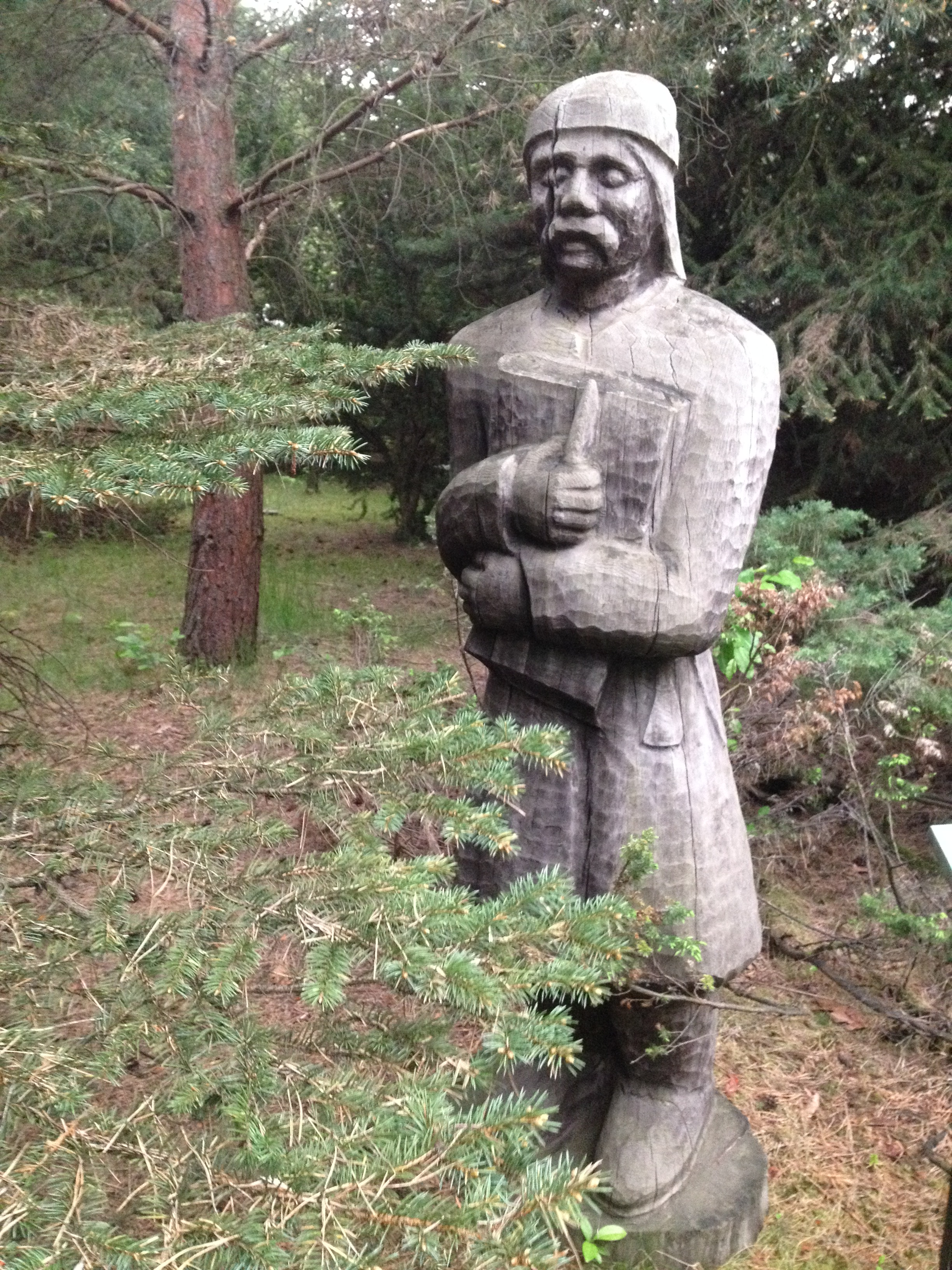
Krabat sculpture in Běła Woda

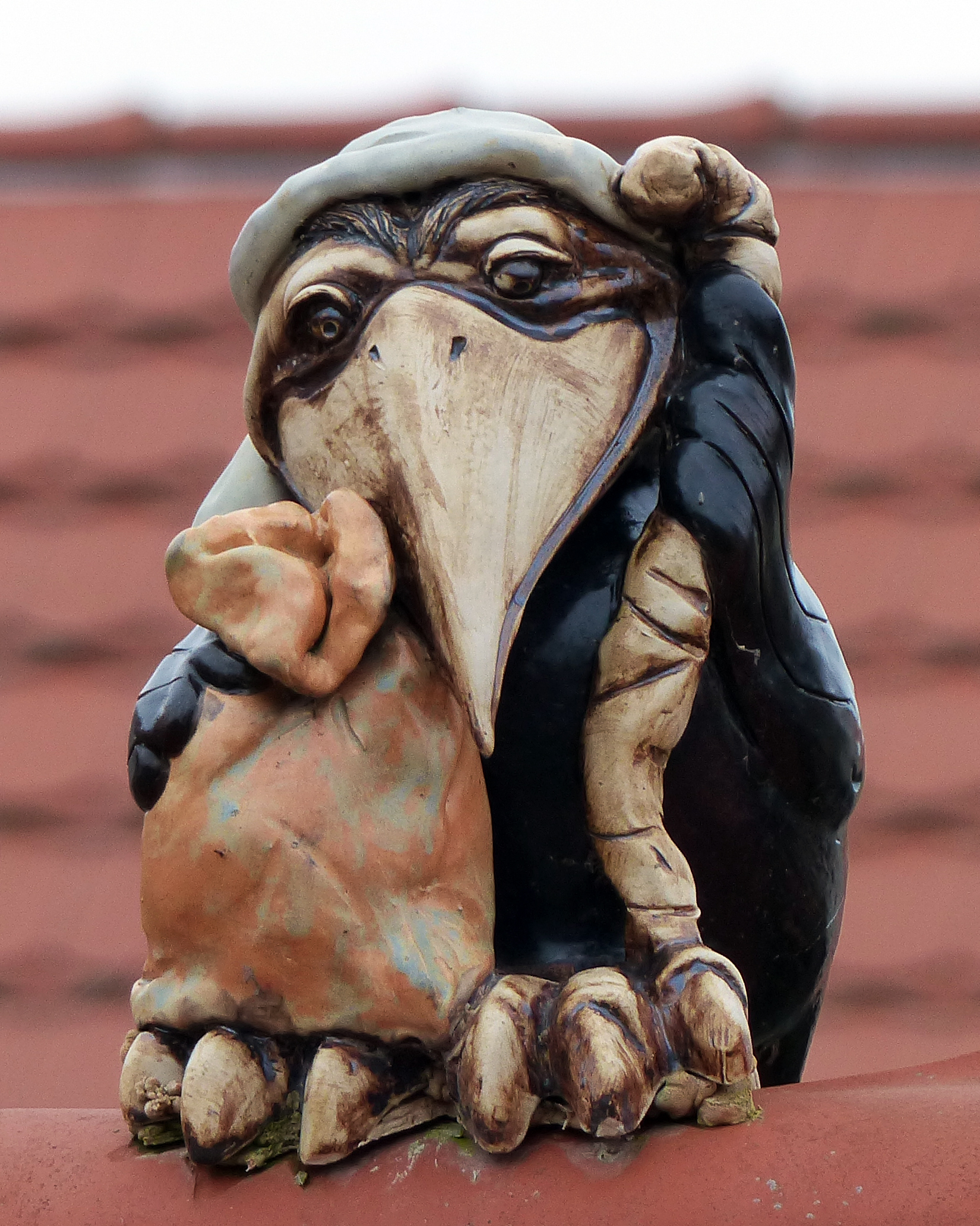
A figurine of Krabat as a raven in Schwarzkollm.

Krabat (German: [ˈkʁaːbat]) is a character in Sorbian folklore, also dubbed the "Wendish Faust". First records of him were mentioned in 1839 minutes of the Akademischen Vereins für lausitzische Geschichte und Sprache, but all writings of the association were lost.

The character developed from an evil sorcerer into a folk hero and beneficial trickster in the course of the 19th century.

== Analysis ==
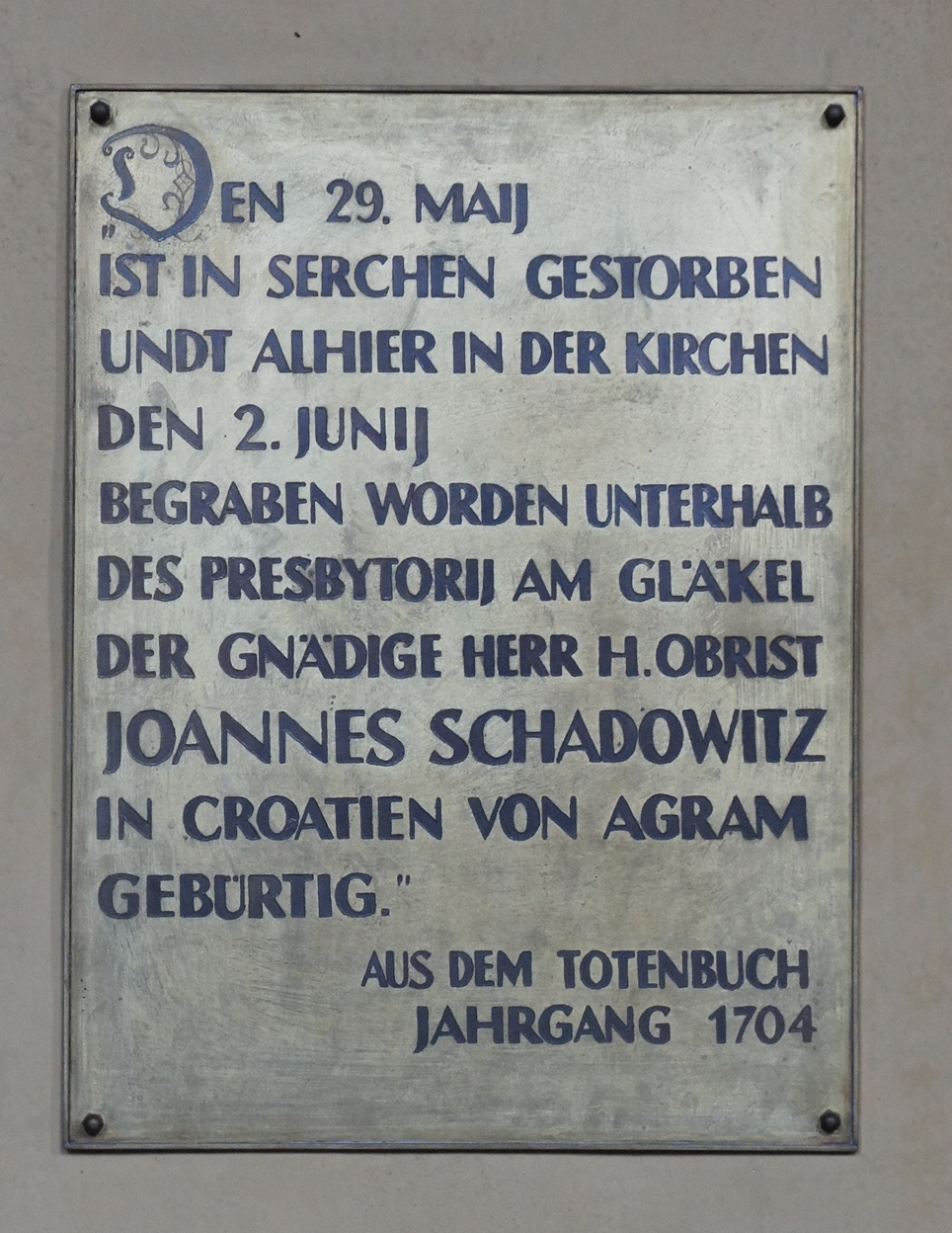

Thorough research of various historical documents established that Krabat was in fact Janko Šajatović (1624–1704), a Croat (Crabat) cavalry commander from Žumberak who came to the north of Germany in 1658 to defend the borders of Christian Europe. After gaining recognition for his military abilities, the Saxon prince invited him to be in his personal guard. As a reward for his trustworthiness, the prince gave him a property in Groß Särchen. There with his knowledge and skills, since he was one of the few literate people in the area which was already inhabited by Sorbs, he helped people in various ways. He taught them to drain swamps, to build mills, and he started farming in that area. A favorite among the nobility and the people, he quickly became a legend, so even after his death, stories about his heroism spread and supernatural powers were attributed to him, which resulted in sagas and legends that inspired many writers.

In folkloristic studies, the tale of Krabat's apprenticeship to an evil sorcerer with malefic powers can be classified, as Aarne–Thompson–Uther ATU 325, "The Sorcerer's Apprentice."

The folk tale is centered around the area of Lusatia, most notably the settlement of Čorny Chołmc (Schwarzkollm), is now a district of the city of Hoyerswerda, where Krabat is said to have learned his sorcerous powers.

== Adaptations ==
The Krabat story has been adapted into several novels, notably:

- Mišter Krabat (Master Krabat) (1954) by Měrćin Nowak-Njechorński
- Čorny młyn (The Black Mill) (1968) by Jurij Brězan, on which the film Die Schwarze Mühle was based.
- Krabat (1971) by Otfried Preußler later inspired the East German TV film Die schwarze Mühle ("The Black Mill") (1975), the Czech film Čarodějův učeň (1977) by Karel Zeman, and the German film Krabat (2008). The Krabat album by German Goth band ASP is also inspired by this version of the legend.

== See also ==
- Krabathor
- Faust

== Bibliography ==
- Jurij Pilk, Adolf Anders, "Der wendische Faust", Sächsischer Erzähler. Illustrierte Beilage, Nr. 14 (1896), reprinted as "Die wendische Faust-Sage", Bunte Bilder aus dem Sachsenlande vol. 3 (1900), 191–201.
- Zipes Jack, ed. (2017). The Sorcerer's Apprentice: An Anthology of Magical Tales. Illustrated by Natalie Frank. Princeton University Press. ISBN 978-1-4008-8563-3.
- Troshkova, A (2019). "The tale type 'The Magician and His Pupil' in East Slavic and West Slavic traditions (based on Russian and Lusatian ATU 325 fairy tales)". Indo-European Linguistics and Classical Philology. XXIII: 1022–1037. doi:10.30842/ielcp230690152376.
