= David Kross =

German actor

- David Kroß
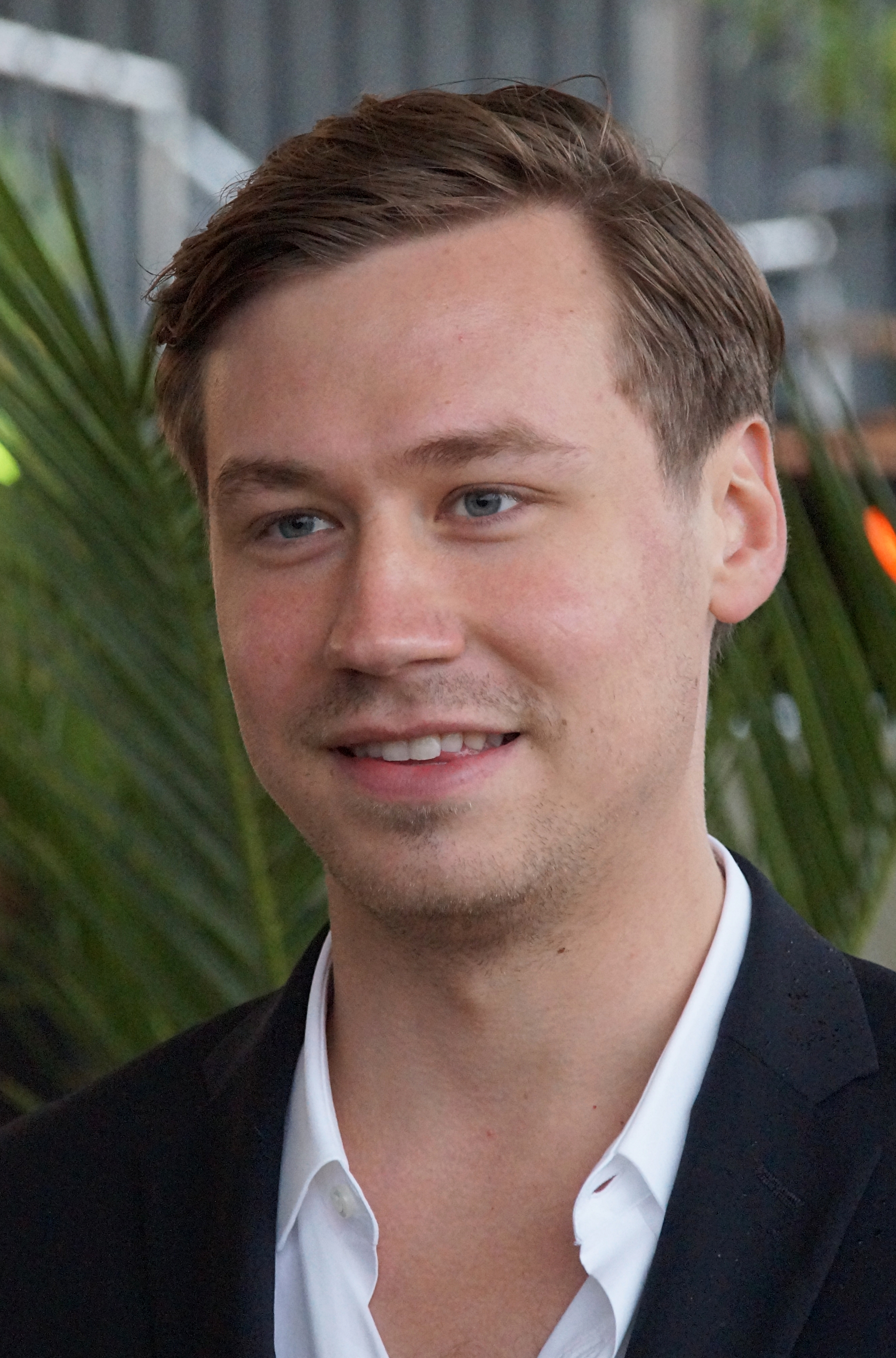
- Kross in 2018
- Born: Henstedt-Ulzburg, West Germany
- Occupation: Actor
- Years active: 2002–present

David Kross is a German actor. He began his career at a young age with a small role in the 2002 film Hilfe, ich bin ein Junge. In 2008, he portrayed Michael Berg in the film The Reader. For his part, he was nominated for various awards and went on to win the Sierra Award at the Las Vegas Film Critics Society Awards for Youth in Film. He has since worked in both German and English-speaking film roles, including War Horse, Race and Into the White.

== Early life and education ==
David Kross was born in Henstedt-Ulzburg, 20 mi (32 km) north of Hamburg. He grew up in Bargteheide, where he attended Eckhorst High School until 2007.

In 2009, Kross started a three-year course at London Academy of Music and Dramatic Art (LAMDA). His plan was to improve his acting and English skills, but he dropped out at the end of the same year to concentrate on films.

== Career ==
Kross's first role was a small one in the 2002 film Hilfe, ich bin ein Junge (English: Help, I'm a Boy!). In December 2003, he joined Blaues Wölkchen, a small group from a children's theatre in Bargteheide. His first major theatrical appearance was in Hilfe, die Herdmanns kommen.

In 2005, Kross came to the attention of Detlev Buck through his daughter, Bernadette, and he auditioned for Tough Enough (Knallhart); Buck hired Kross to play the lead, a 15-year-old boy who moves with his mother from a rich neighborhood of Berlin (Zehlendorf) to the Neukölln area, known at the time for its high number of Turkish immigrants and high crime level. Kross not only won praise at Berlinale in 2006, but also won Best Actor in Nuremberg at the 11th Filmfestival Türkei/Deutschland.

In 2006, Kross worked again with Buck in the film Hands off Mississippi (Hände weg von Mississippi), playing an apprentice baker. In the fall of the same year, he started shooting a film by Marco Kreuzpaintner, Krabat (The Satanic Mill). In this version of Otfried Preußler's children's book, Kross plays the title role, one of the apprentices of magic, with co-stars Daniel Brühl and Robert Stadlober. The film was released on 19 September 2007 in movie festivals and in October 2008 in theatres.

In September 2007, The Reader began shooting in Berlin, Cologne, and Görlitz. In Stephen Daldry's adaption of the best-selling novel by Bernhard Schlink about the relationship between a teenage boy and an older woman, Kross plays the lead role of Michael Berg, opposite Kate Winslet, Ralph Fiennes, and Bruno Ganz. He had to learn to speak English to appear in the film. The world premiere was at the Ziegfeld Theatre in New York on 3 December 2008. The film was presented in the 2009 Berlinale but did not compete. In May 2009, Kross was honored for his performance in The Reader at the 62nd Cannes Festival, winning the Chopard trophy. Kross was nominated for a European Film Award as best actor.

His next work was Same Same but Different (2009), again with Buck directing. The script is based on an autobiographical article by Benjamin Prüfer.

In June 2010, it was announced that Kross had been cast in Steven Spielberg's film War Horse. Filming started in August 2010, in Dartmoor, Devon, U.K. and the film was released in December 2011.

== Personal life ==
In 2011 he was living in Berlin-Mitte, and expressed no desire to move to Hollywood, preferring to stay in Germany and continue making both German and English language films.

== Filmography ==
Year	Film	Role	Notes
2002	Hilfe, ich bin ein Junge	Paddy	Help, I'm a Boy!
2003	Adam & Eva	Adams Sohn	Austrian film
2006	Knallhart	Michael Polischka	Tough Enough
2007	Hände weg von Mississippi	Bäckerlehrling Bröckel	Hands off Mississippi
2008	Krabat	Krabat	Adapted from a German language novel Krabat (The Satanic Mill in English) by Otfried Preußler
2008	The Reader	Young Michael Berg	Las Vegas Film Critics Award for Youth in Film; Nominated – Broadcast Film Critics Association Award for Best Young Performer; Nominated – Chicago Film Critics Association Award for Best Actor; Nominated – European Film Award for Best Actor
2009	Same Same but Different	Ben	Received Variety Piazza Grande Award at the International Film Festival organised in Locarno.
2011	Promising the Moon	Young Osvalds Kalnins	
2011	Rio	Blu	German Voice
2011	War Horse	Private Gunther Schröder	
2012	Into the White	Josef Auchtor	
2012	Measuring the World	Eugen Gauß	
2013	Michael Kohlhaas	The Preacher	
2015	Boy 7	Sam	
2016	Race	Carl "Luz" Long	
2016	The General Case	Joachim Hell	TV film
2017	Halal Daddy	Jasper	
2018	Balloon	Günter Wetzel	
2019	The Keeper	Bert Trautmann	
2020	Rising High	Viktor	
2021	Prey	Roman	
2021	Confessions of Felix Krull	Marquis de Venosta	
2021	The King's Man	Adolf Hitler	Credited as Moustached Man
2024	Kafka		Miniseries
2025	The World Will Tremble	Sturmbannfuhrer Herbert Lange	
2025	Fabula	The Grape	Opening film of the IFFR.
2027	Wind of Change	Andrej	

== Awards ==
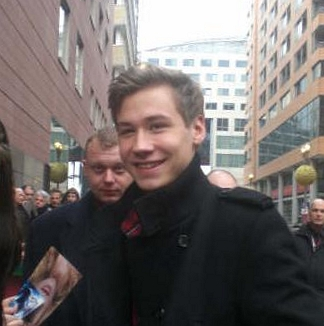
Kross in 2009

- At the 11th Filmfestival Türkei/Deutschland in Nuremberg, Kross won his first award as "Actor in a Leading Role" for his performance in Detlev Bucks Tough Enough (German: Knallhart).
- 2008 Nominated for a Chicago Film Critics Association Awards in Most Promising Performer.
- 2009 Nominated in the Broadcast Film Critics Association Awards in Best Young Actor / Actress (Under 21).
- 2009 Won a Las Vegas Film Critics Society Award in Youth in Film.
- 2009 Shooting Stars Award, at the Berlin International Film Festival, annual acting awards for up-and-coming actors by European Film Promotion.
- 2009 Nominated for a European Film Award.
- 2010 Shooting Stars Award at Romy TV-Awards, together with Cristiana Capotondi.
- 2010 Audi Generation Award.
- 2012 Won the Chopard Trophy for male Revelation at the Cannes Film Festival.
