= Hypnos (band) =

Czech death metal band

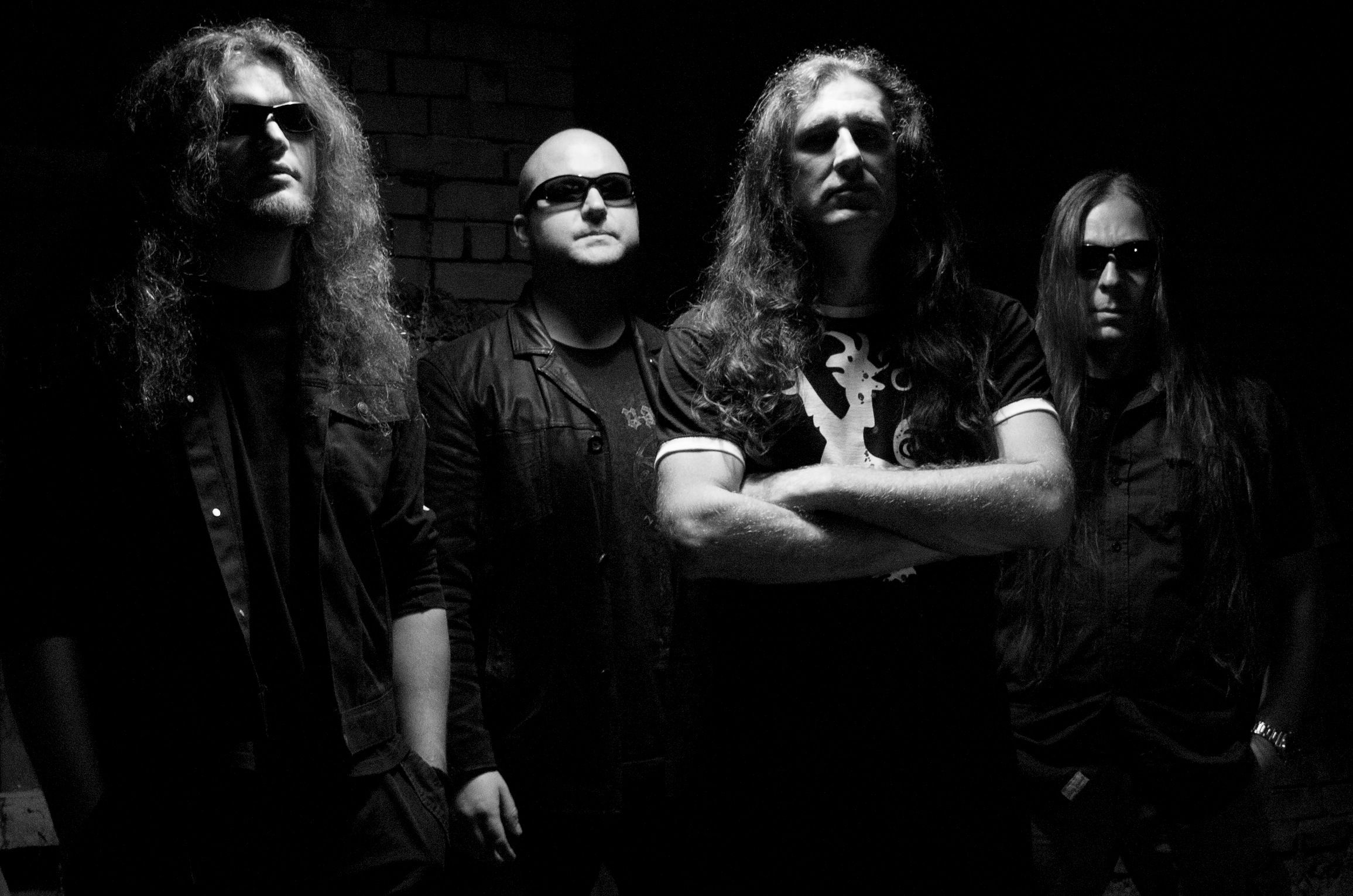
- Hypnos in 2013

Background information
- Origin: Staré Město, Czech Republic
- Genres: Death metal
- Years active: 1999–2006; 2009–present
- Labels: Einheit Produktionen, Morbid Records
- Spinoff of: Krabathor
- Members: Bronislav Kovařík; Peter Hlaváč; Martin Klinkera; Vlastimil Urbanec
- Past members: Radek Lebánek; René Hilek; Igor Mores; David Menšík; Milan Večerka; Igor Hubí
- Website: hypnos-cz.com

Hypnos (between 2004 and 2006, Hypnös) is a Czech death metal band from Staré Město, formed in 1999. The group consists of Bronislav Kovařík (vocals, bass), Peter Hlaváč (drums), Vlastimil Urbanec (guitar), and Martin Klinkera (guitar). As of 2020, they have released six studio albums, two EPs, and one compilation.

== History ==
Hypnos was formed in the Czech town of Staré Město in 1999 by singer and bassist Bronislav "Bruno" Kovařík and drummer Peter "Pegas" Hlaváč, who were both previously in the death metal band Krabathor. The band's name is inspired by the 1990 song by Austrian death metal band Pungent Stench. They were soon joined by guitarist Radek "RAD" Lebánek.

Having signed with Morbid Records in 2000, the band released a self-titled EP, which included a cover of "the Cave" by Italian metal band Bulldozer. This was followed by the full-length album In Blood We Trust, still in 2000. RAD had left the band before the album was recorded and was replaced by René "Hire" Hilek, also previously from Krabathor. The band added a second guitarist, Igor Mores. The album also included contributions from Finnish vocalist Mika Luttinen (Impaled Nazarene) and keyboardist Tomáš Kmeť. Both Hilek and Mores left following the release.

The band's second album, The Revenge Ride, which again included Tomáš Kmeť on keyboards as well as new guitarist David Menšík, came out in 2001 and was produced by Harris Johns (Helloween, Kreator, Voivod, Sodom). In 2004, the band released the retrospective collection Demo(n)s, which included demos, live, and previously unreleased tracks. They also adjusted the spelling of their name to Hypnös, to express a move away from old-school death metal to a more modern concept of the genre. They released Rabble Mänifesto in 2005, again with the help of German producer Johns. This latest record featured newly inducted guitarist Milan "Butch Mills" Večerka, with Menšík playing on several songs, among other guests. The album, which included an English cover of the Törr song "Kult ohně" (under the title "Tribe Fire Ritual"), was nominated for an Anděl Award in the Hard and Heavy category. Pegas left the group in 2005 and a year later, Hypnös split up.

In 2009, after a five-year hiatus, Bruno and Pegas began jamming together again, eventually releasing the EP Halfway to Hell, in 2010. That year, together with new guitarist Igor "Igorr" Hubík (Root), they played a comeback concert at Brutal Assault. By late 2011, the band signed with German label Einheit Produktionen and a year later, released the album Heretic Commando / Rise of the New Antikrist, having added Vlastimil "Vlasa" Urbanec on second guitar. Igorr returned to his former band in 2013 and was replaced by guitarist Martin "Canni" Klinkera.

In 2016, recording began on the next Hypnos album. The Whitecrow was released a year later and included contributions from Paul Speckmann (Krabathor, Master), among others. It was followed in 2020 by The Blackcrow.

== Band members ==
=== Current ===
- Bronislav "Bruno" Kovařík – vocals, bass guitar (1999–present)
- Peter "Pegas" Hlaváč – drums (1999–present)
- Vlastimil "Vlasa" Urbanec – guitar (2010–present)
- Martin "Canni" Klinkera – guitar (2014–present)

=== Past ===
- Radek "RAD" Lebánek – guitar (1999–2000)
- René "Hire" Hilek – guitar (2000)
- Igor Mores – guitar (2000)
- David Menšík – guitar (2000–2001)
- Milan "Butch Mills" Večerka – guitar (2001–2006)
- Igor "Igorr" Hubík – guitar (2004–2006, 2010–2014)

=== Touring musicians ===
- Jan Samek – guitar (2001–2005, 2010)
- Aleš "Alex" Marek – guitar (2000–2004)
- Ikaroz – guitar (2004)
- Peter Bajči – drums (2005–2006)

== Discography ==
Studio albums

- In Blood We Trust (2000)
- The Revenge Ride (2001)
- Rabble Mänifesto (2005)
- Heretic Commando / Rise of the New Antikrist (2012)
- The Whitecrow (2017)
- The Blackcrow (2020)

EPs

- Hypnos (2000)
- Halfway to Hell (2010)

Compilations

- Demo(n)s – The Collection 1999–2003 (2004)
