= Paul Speckmann =

American musician (born 1963)

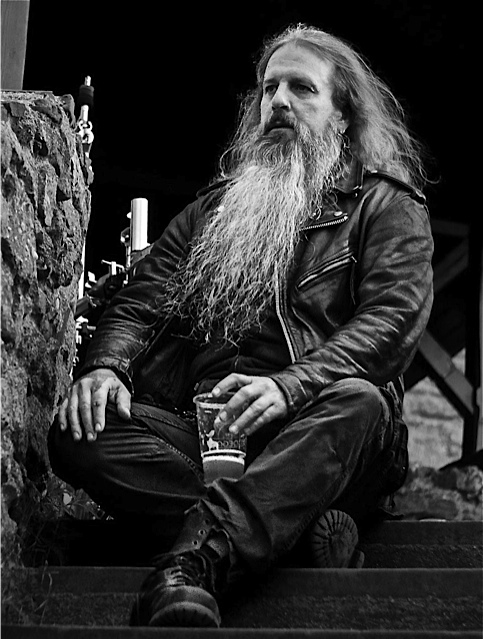
- Speckmann in 2014

Background information
- Born: September 28, 1963 (age 63)
- Origin: Chicago, Illinois, US
- Genre: Death metal
- Occupation: Musician
- Instruments: Vocals, bass
- Years active: 1982–present
- Member of: Master
- Formerly of: Warcry; Death Strike; Abomination; Krabathor
- Website: https://speckmetal.net/ http://master-speckmetal.net

Paul Speckmann (born September 28, 1963) is an American bassist and singer from Chicago, Illinois. He currently lives in Uherské Hradiště, Czechia.

== Biography ==
Speckmann formed his first band, Warcry, in 1982. He recorded the demo Trilogy of Terror with them in 1983, before starting the death metal band Master. This project was quickly put on hold, however, and Speckmann launched Death Strike, with whom he recorded the Fuckin' Death demo in 1985. This was later re-released on Nuclear Blast as a full album with additional tracks, in 1991. In 1985, Master got back together and released 85 Demo. In 1990, they issued a split EP with Abomination, a band with which Speckmann recorded a self-titled album the same year and Tragedy Strikes two years later.

Between 1990 and 1999, Speckmann released four studio albums and several demos with Master, another album and an EP with Abomination, one-off recordings each with the groups Walpurgisnacht, Solutions, and Martyr, and finally, a self-titled album with his own Speckmann Project. In 1999, he was invited to join the Czech death metal band Krabathor, with whom Master had previously toured. He recorded the albums Unfortunately Dead (2000) and Dissuade Truth (2003) with them, while also publishing new material with Master, whose latest release, the EP 40 Years and Killing, came out in 2025.

== Discography ==
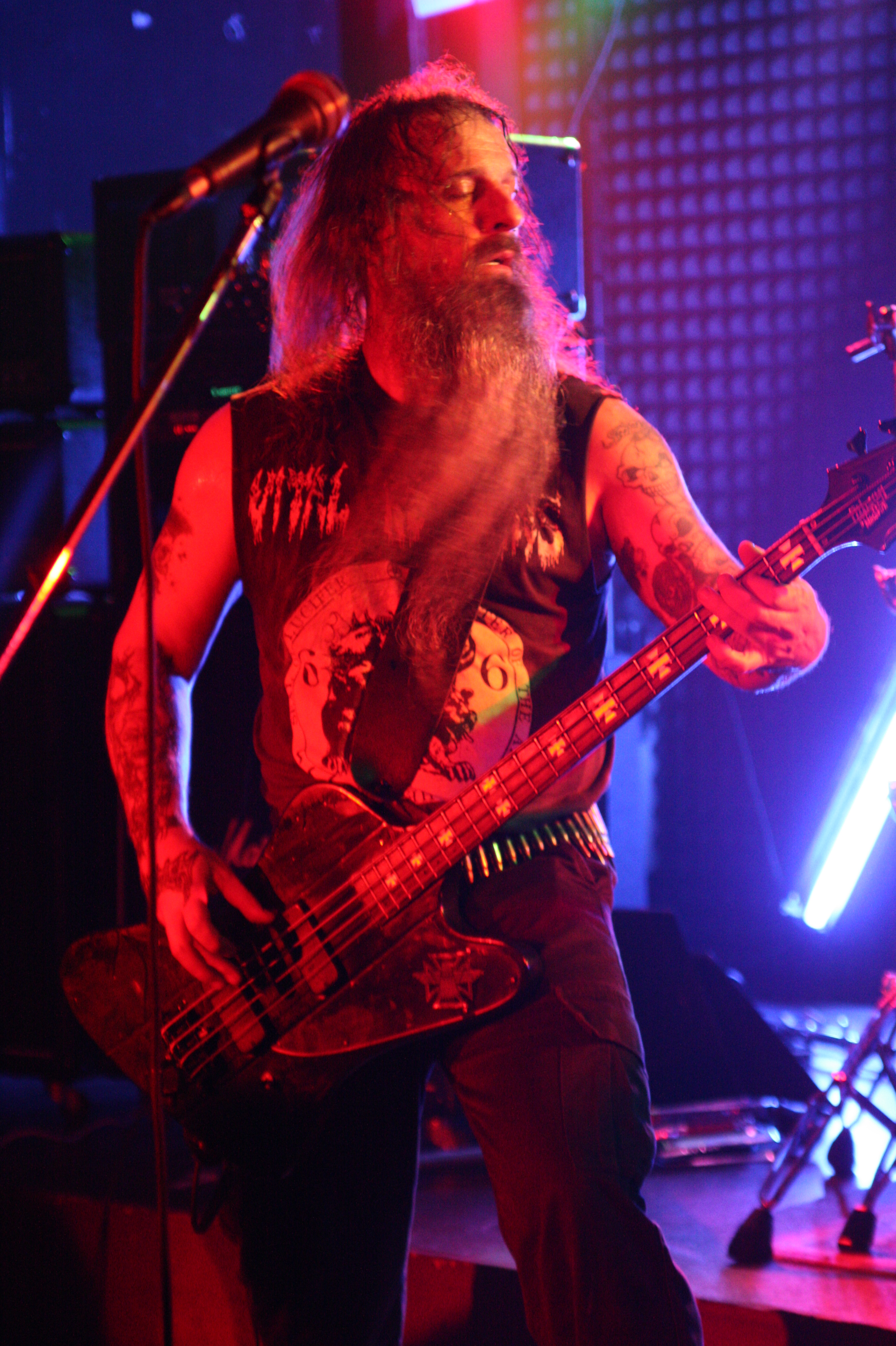
Speckmann performing with Master in 2009

=== with Master ===
Studio albums

- Master (1990)
- On the Seventh Day God Created... Master (1992)
- Collection of Souls (1993)
- Faith Is in Season (1998)
- Let's Start a War (2002)
- Unreleased 1985 Album (2003)
- The Spirit of the West (2004)
- Four More Years of Terror (2005)
- Slaves to Society (2007)
- The Human Machine (2010)
- The New Elite (2012)
- The Witch Hunt (2013)
- An Epiphany of Hate (2016)
- Vindictive Miscreant (2018)
- Saints Dispelled (2024)
- Among the Seeds of Death (2026)

EPs

- Master/Abomination split EP (1990)
- Master/Excision split EP (1996)
- Follow Your Savior (2001)
- Imperial Anthems Master/Pentagram Chile split EP (2013)
- Decay Into Inferior Conditions Master/Dehuman split EP (2017)
- Widower (2019)

Live albums

- Live in Mexico City (2000)
- Live Assault (DVD – 2013)
- Mangled Dehumanization (2016)
- Live (2018)
- God of Thunder (2019)
- Alive in Athens (2020)

Compilations

- Masterpieces (2005)
- Command Your Fate (The Demo Collection) (2017)
- Best of (2018)

Demos

- 85 Demo (1985)
- Demo '91 (1991)
- Final Word (1995)
- Everything Is Rotten (2005)

=== with Abomination ===
- Abomination (1990)
- Tragedy Strikes (1992)
- The Final War EP (1999)
- Curses of the Deadly Sin (1999)

=== with Krabathor ===
- Unfortunately Dead (2000)
- Dissuade Truth (2003)

=== Other projects ===
- Warcry – Trilogy of Terror (demo, 1983)
- Death Strike – Fuckin' Death (demo, 1985)
- Death Strike – Fuckin' Death (1991)
- Speckmann Project – Speckmann Project (1991)
- Walpurgisnacht – Live Demo (demo, 1997)
- Solutions – Solutions (1999)
- Martyr – Murder X: The End of the Game (2000)
- Speckmann – ...God Created Master (The Early Years) (2001)
- The Architects of Hate – Pure Hate EP (2008)
- Johansson & Speckmann – Sulphur Skies (2013)
- Johansson & Speckmann – Mask of the Treacherous (2014)
- Johansson & Speckmann – Edge of the Abyss (2016)
- Cadaveric Poison – Cadaveric Poison (2016)
- Johansson & Speckmann – From the Mouth of Madness (2018)
- Johansson & Speckmann – The Germs of Circumstance (2020)
- Speckmann Project – Fiends of Emptiness (2022)
- Johansson & Speckmann – Beneath a Bleeding Sky (2023)
