= Krabathor =

Czech metal band

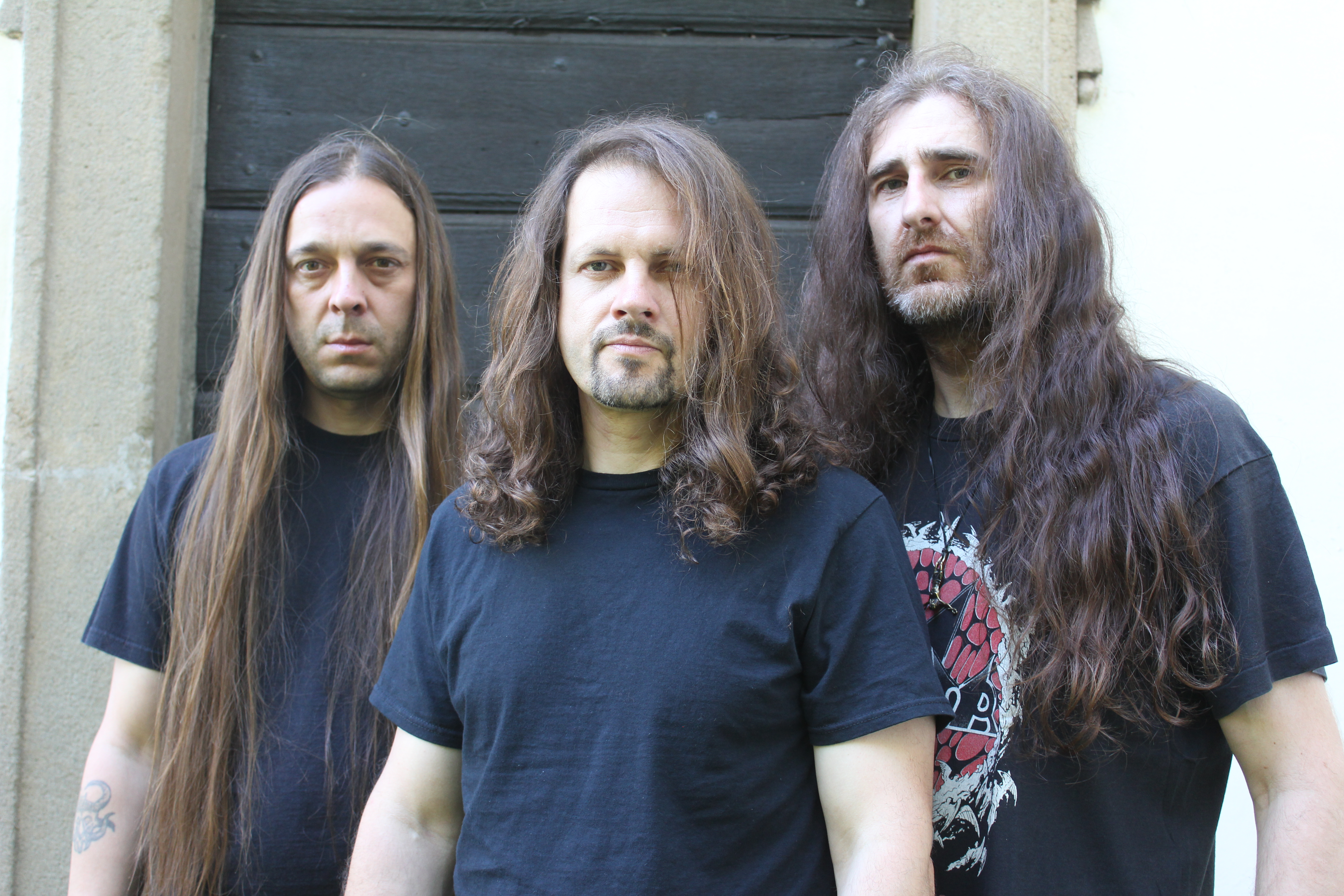
- Krabathor in 2014

Background information
- Also known as: Krabator
- Origin: Staré Město, Czech Republic
- Genre: Death metal
- Years active: 1984–2003, 2014–present
- Labels: System Shock; Morbid Records; Deathvastation Productions; Monitor Records
- Spinoffs: Hypnos
- Members: Petr Kryštof; Bronislav Kovařík; Peter Hlaváč

Krabathor, spelled Krabator on their early demos, is a Czech death metal band from Uherské Hradiště, founded by vocalist and guitarist Petr "Christopher" Kryštof in 1984. The band includes bassist/vocalist Bronislav "Bruno" Kovařík and drummer Peter "Pegas" Hlaváč.

== History ==
Krabathor, whose name comes from Krabat, the main character in the Sorbian fairy tale The Satanic Mill, was formed in 1984. In 1988, they released their first rehearsal demo, Breath of Death, followed by Total Destruction and Brutal Death, all as Krabator. In 1991, the studio demo Pocity detronizace was recorded, resulting in a two-album deal with Monitor Records. The band's first studio album, Only Our Death Is Welcome..., was released in 1992 and followed by Cool Mortification a year later. After singing a record deal with Morbid Records, the band issued the album Lies in 1995, supported by their first European tour, with Impaled Nazarene.

In March 1998, Krabathor issued the album Orthodox, and they toured Europe with Cannibal Corpse. A year later, they toured with Malevolent Creation and Master. At that point, Kovařík left the band to form Hypnos and was replaced by Paul Speckmann of Master. This lineup issued two albums, Unfortunately Dead (2000) and Dissuade Truth (2003). As of 2026, these are Krabathor's last original releases.

In 2003, after playing their last concert at the inaugural Basinfirefest in Spálené Poříčí, the band went on an indefinite hiatus. Kryštof moved to the United States, Speckmann returned to Master, and drummer Libor Lebánek formed the band Bad Face with his brother.

In 2014, Kryštof, Kovařík, and Hlaváč reformed Krabathor for an exclusive show at the Brutal Assault festival in Jaroměř. In 2015, they launched the Krabatour, performing several concerts across the Czech Republic and Slovakia.

In 2021, the band released Demonizer / Mortal Memories II, a compilation of their 1988 demos Breath of Death, Total Destruction, and Brutal Death.

== Band members ==
Current

- Petr "Christopher" Kryštof – guitars, vocals (1984–2006, 2013–present)
- Bronislav "Bruno" Kovařík – bass, vocals (1986–1987, 1991–1998, 2013–present); drums (1988–1990)
- Peter "Pegas" Hlaváč – drums (1993–1996, 2013–present)

Past

- Roman "Myšák" Podškubka – bass (1984–1986, 1988)
- Luděk "Havran" Havránek – drums (1984–1987, 1987–1988, 1989)
- Radek "Bája" Kutil – guitar (1988–1990)
- Jiří "Necron" Novák – bass (1988–1990)
- Petr "Kopec" Kopeček – drums (1990–1993)
- Martin "Trachta" Mikulec – guitar (1990, 1993)
- René "Hire" Hílek – guitar (1991–1992)
- Libor "Skull" Lebánek – drums (1996–2004)
- Paul Speckmann – bass, vocals (1999–2005)

Session musicians

- M. Štědroň – keyboards on Pocity detronizace and Feelings of Dethronisation
- Petr Ackermann – keyboards on Only Our Death Is Welcome... and Cool Mortification
- Tomáš Kmeť – keyboards on Lies and Orthodox
- Irena Černíčková – keyboards on Unfortunately Dead

== Discography ==
- Breath of Death (demo, 1988)
- Total Destruction (demo, 1988)
- Brutal Death (demo, 1988)
- Pocity detronizace (demo, 1991)
- Feelings of Dethronisation (demo, 1991)
- Only Our Death Is Welcome... (1992)
- Cool Mortification (1993)
- The Rise of Brutality (EP, 1995)
- Lies (1995)
- Mortal Memories (EP, 1997)
- Orthodox (1998)
- First Alben (2-CD re-release of Only Our Death Is Welcome... and Cool Mortification, 1999)
- Unfortunately Dead (2000)
- Dissuade Truth (2003)
- 20 Years of Madness (2-CD demo collection, 2005)
- Rebirth of Brutality: Live in Uherské Hradiště (CD + 2 DVDs, 2015)
- Dema 1988 (compilation of 1988 demos, 2021)
- Demonizer / Mortal Memories II (compilation of Breath of Death, Total Destruction, and Brutal Death, 2021)
