= The Little Witch =

1957 German children's book by Otfried Preußler

The Little Witch is a children's book written by Otfried Preußler, first published in 1957. Since then, the book has been translated into 47 different languages. All editions include illustrations by Winnie Gebhardt-Gayler.

== Plot ==
Together with her talking raven Abraxas, the Little Witch lives in a tiny warped house in the woods. Her biggest dream is to fly around the Blocksberg together with all the great witches. But one Walpurgis Night, when she tries to join the other witches without permission, she gets caught. As punishment the witches burn her broom but promise her, she will be allowed to participate at the next Walpurgis Night, if she has become a “Good Witch” until then.

Over one year, the Little Witch tries her best to do good, help people in need, punish villains, save animals, she even makes new friends. When she comes before the witch council again, to show what a good witch she has become, it becomes clear, that in their opinion a good witch has to be good at being evil. The council plans on punishing her with the chore to collect firewood for the Walpurgis Night pyre. But the Little Witch gets her revenge instead with casting a spell on the great witches and taking their spell books and brooms away, therefore rendering them powerless. She uses the books and brooms to make her own Walpurgis Night pyre.

== Characters ==
=== The Little Witch ===
The Little Witch is the main character of the story. She is 127 years old and thought to be kind and ambitious. She lives in the deep woods in a tiny house with a warped roof, a crooked chimney and rickety window shutters. She practices her magic for six hours every day, while sitting in front of the fire.

=== Abraxas ===
Abraxas is a speaking raven and the Little Witch's best friend. He is very smart and gives her advice in problematic situations. He also criticizes her errors while practicing witchcraft.

=== The Weather-Witch Rumpumpel ===
The witch named Rumpumpel is the Little Witch's opponent. Her talents lie especially within the area of weather. She discovers the Little Witch at the first Walpurgis night and takes her to the head witch. When the Little Witch is told to become a good witch, Rumpumpel tails her and reports her good deeds to the witch council.

=== Thomas and Vroni ===
Thomas and Vroni are the children of the village innkeeper. When they get lost in the woods while looking for mushrooms, they become friends with the Little Witch. She helps them to find their way back home. After that, Thomas and Vroni invite the Little Witch to come to the "Schützenfest" (= marksmen's fair) with them. At the festivities, a bull named Korbinian, who is Thomas' and Vroni's best friend, is supposed to be the reward for the "Schützenkönig" (= champion shot) and will be slaughtered for his win. To keep that from happening, the Little Witch enchants the guns so that only Thomas hits the target. He is crowned Schützenkönig and is allowed to keep the bull Korbinian.

=== The Head Witch ===
The head witch is the leader of the witches. She sits on a throne made out of oven forks and is described as evil but also cooperative. Her responsibility is the punishment of witches, for example when they use magic on Fridays, which is strictly forbidden. Unlike Rumpumpel and the other witches, the head witch was quite nice to the Little Witch initially. Though this sentiment changes when the witch council becomes aware of the Little Witch's good deeds.

== Origin ==
According to the author himself, the story of the Little Witch first came to life through bedtime stories he made up for his three daughters to take away their fear of evil witches. After retelling the stories at school and them becoming quite popular, he started writing them down.

In January 2013, a new edition planned by the "Thienemann Verlag" became subject of several media reports. In this new edition a few words were intended to be changed, words which were, according to the publisher, in need of modernization with respect to modern language use.

As examples the German words Neger, wichsen and Zigeuner were mentioned, all words that, stated by the publisher, are no longer used nor understood in their original semantic context.

The changes to the original were developed in cooperation with the author's family, that had rejected any text adjustments at first. The new edition was released in July 2013.
