= Christian Redl =

German actor

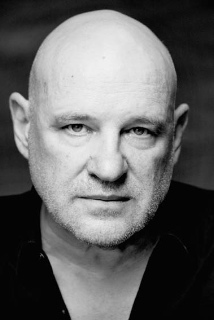
- Redl in 2009

Background information
- Born: 20 April 1948 (age 77); Schleswig, Schleswig-Holstein, Allied-occupied Germany
- Occupations: Actor; narrator; singer
- Years active: 1986–present

Christian Redl (born 20 April 1948) is a German actor and singer.

== Life ==
Christian Redl is the son of a teacher. He grew up in Kassel, trained from 1967 to 1970 at the Schauspielschule Bochum and was then engaged in theatres in Wuppertal, Frankfurt, Bremen, and Hamburg, where he worked with Claus Peymann, Luc Bondy, and Peter Zadek. In 1986, he starred in his first big role in a cinema production, which is Uwe Schrader's Sierra Leone. He became well-known in the end of the 1980s and the beginning of the 1990s for films by Bernd Schadewald, especially for his lead role in the 1990 TV film Der Hammermörder, for which he earned the Grimme-Preis and for the 1994 film Angst, for which he was nominated for a Telestar award.

Along with his theatre work, there were more TV productions, in which he worked with Matti Geschonneck holding a special place: Der Rosenmörder, Ein mörderischer Plan, and Späte Rache. Two more cinema productions were Lea directed by Ivan Fíla and The Trio directed by Hermine Huntgeburth. He also starred as Generaloberst Alfred Jodl in the 2004 Oliver Hirschbiegel film Downfall. Redl also played abysmal figures in the German film Tattoo directed by Robert Schwentke and in the ZDF police film series Nachtschicht by Lars Becker. He is regularly seen in cinema and TV productions, especially in TV thrillers like the ZDF series KDD – Kriminaldauerdienst and in international films like Krabat by Marco Kreuzpaintner and Die Päpstin by Sönke Wortmann. At the Hamburger Kammerspiele, he starred in Kunst and Der Totmacher, and at the St.-Pauli-Theater in the Dreigroschenoper, in Sonny Boys, and in Arsen und Spitzenhäubchen. In the spring of 2009, he starred in Tod in der Eifel, a TV film directed by Johannes Grieser, and in Der Tote im Spreewald. Since 2006, Redl starred as the laconic and lonely commissioner Thorsten Krüger in the ZDF crime series Spreewaldkrimi, playing in Spreewald, where the aftermaths of which are sporadically filmed. In 2013, he won the German Academy of Television award for best supporting actor for his role in Marie Brand und die offene Rechnung.

He also works as an audiobook speaker and musician.

Christian Redl had been dating actress Maja Maranow for many years. He is the stepbrother of actor Wolf Redl.

== Selected filmography ==
- 1987: Sierra Leone - Fred
- 1990: Der Hammermörder (TV Movie) - Erich Rohloff
- 1991: Verurteilt: Anna Leschek (TV Movie) - Günther Siebert
- 1992: Shadow Boxer - Rasselin
- 1992–1997: Der Fahnder (TV Series) - Robert Tiedemann
- 1992–2010: Ein Fall für zwei (TV Series) - Bernhard Wartenburg / Rudolf / Georg Kring
- 1994: Angst (TV Movie) - Herwig Seitz
- 1994: Doppelter Einsatz (TV Series) - Uhlstedt
- 1994: Judgment Day (TV Movie) - Erwin's father
- 1995: Satan's Children (TV Movie) - Pfarrer
- 1995: Bunte Hunde - Kommissar Goethals
- 1996: Die Kommissarin (TV Series) - Julius Winterberg
- 1996: Wolffs Revier (TV Series) - Olaf Abt
- 1996: Ein starkes Team (TV Series) - Holm
- 1996: Lea - Strehlow
- 1997: Die Gang (TV Series) - Paul Zwingler
- 1997: Sperling (TV Series)
- 1997: Child Murder (TV Movie) - Oskar Lehmann
- 1997: Koerbers Akte: Kleines Mädchen – Großes Geld (TV Movie) - Herr Wilms
- 1997: The Darkness Experiment - Professor Havlik
- 1997: Angeschlagen (TV Movie) - Chef
- 1998: Vicky's Nightmare (TV Movie) - Kommissar Wachsmann
- 1998: The Trio - Karl
- 1998: Bertolt Brecht - Liebe, Revolution und andere gefährliche Sachen
- 1998: Hundert Jahre Brecht - Baal
- 1998: Der Rosenmörder (TV Movie) - Georg Taubert
- 1998: Solo for Clarinet - Thomas Hecht
- 1998–1999: Zwei Brüder (TV Series) - Leo Passlack / Passlack
- 1999: Urlaub auf Leben und Tod (TV Movie) - Popeye
- 1999: Oscar und Leni - Oskar
- 1999: Federmann (TV Movie) - Federmann
- 1999: St. Pauli Night - Brilli
- 1999: Gangster - Duvall
- 1999: Sturmzeit (TV Series) - Victor Domberg
- 2000: Das gestohlene Leben (TV Movie) - Bruno Stein
- 2000: Anwalt Abel (TV Series) - Claudius
- 2000: Mordkommission (TV Series)
- 2000: Ein mörderischer Plan (TV Movie) - Robert Pfaff
- 2000: Einer geht noch (TV Movie) - Heinzi Schämpp
- 2000: Die Straßen von Berlin (TV Series)
- 2000: Aberdeen (German version)
- 2001: Die Verbrechen des Professor Capellari (TV Series) - C.C. Brinkmann
- 2001: Späte Rache (TV Movie) - Klaus Klempow
- 2002: Tattoo - Minks
- 2002: Operation Rubikon (TV Movie) - Innenminister Langheinrich
- 2002: Tödliches Vertrauen (TV Movie) - Kommissar Tönning
- 2003: Der Aufstand (TV Movie) - Beria (Head of KGB)
- 2003: Nachts, wenn der Tag beginnt (TV Movie) - Dr. Friedrich Thomasius
- 2003: Die Geisel (TV Movie) - Vollmer
- 2003–2009: Tatort (TV Series) - Egon Pohl / Kriminaldirektor Volker Römhild / Robert Brandstetter / Gernot Dietz / Erich Blacher
- 2004: Das Duo (TV Series) - Ole Krogmann
- 2004: Der Untergang - General Alfred Jodl
- 2004–2011: Nachtschicht (TV Series) - Clemente / Rudi Sakora / Rudi
- 2005: Spiele der Macht – 11011 Berlin (TV Movie)
- 2005: Die letzte Schlacht (TV Movie) - General Hans Krebs
- 2005: Schimanski (TV Series) - Gaubner
- 2005: Unter Verdacht: Das Karussell (TV Series) - Janker
- 2005: Unsolved (TV Series) - Ulrich Claussen
- 2006: Wilsberg (TV Series) - Debelius
- 2006: Als der Fremde kam (TV Movie) - Mathias Wernicke
- 2006–2019: Spreewaldkrimi (TV Series) - Kommissar Thorsten Krüger
- 2007: Post Mortem (TV Series) - Pater Arrango
- 2007: Yella - Yellas Vater
- 2007: Alarm für Cobra 11 (TV Series) - Roman Gehlen
- 2007: KDD – Kriminaldauerdienst (TV Series) - Rainer Sallek
- 2207: Treasure Island - Billy Bones
- 2008: Ten: Umbra Mortis (TV Movie) - Renz
- 2008: Krabat - Meister - Evil Sorcerer
- 2008: Tod in der Eifel (TV Movie) - Rolf Schanz
- 2009: Volcano (TV Movie) - Ludwig Schöngau
- 2009: Die Päpstin - Abbot of Fulda
- 2010: Der Kriminalist (TV Series) - Gerhard Bendix
- 2010: Der Uranberg (TV Movie) - Gottlieb Meinel
- 2011: SOKO Wismar (TV Series) - Benno Grabert
- 2011: Polizeiruf 110 (TV Series) - Hubert Marka
- 2011: Der Staatsanwalt (TV Series) - Lukas Vogt
- 2011–2016: Küstenwache (TV Series) - Gerd Thiele / Nils Rudolph
- 2012: White Tiger (Belyy tigr) - Keytel
- 2013: Marie Brand und die offene Rechnung (TV Movie) - Markus Rombach
- 2013: Das Jerusalem-Syndrom (TV Movie)
- 2014: Schuld um Schuld (Short) - Konrad
- 2015: Grzimek (TV Movie) - Gustav Lederer
- 2015: Bella Block (TV Series) - Inspekteur der Marine Schelling
- 2015: Frau Roggenschaubs Reise (TV Movie) - Klaus Roggenschaub
- 2016: Die Chefin (TV Series) - Josef Köhler
- 2017: Killing Tide: A Brittany Mystery (TV Series) - Charles Morin
- 2017: Verräter (TV Movie) - Gerd
- 2018: The Old Fox (TV Series) - Robert Krüger
- 2018: Mack the Knife: Brecht's Threepenny Film - Tiger Brown
- 2018: Kaisersturz (TV Movie) - Friedrich Ebert
- 2019: Die Toten von Salzburg (TV Series) - Jan Torbeck
- 2019: Devil's Valley (TV Movie) - Georg Wendt
- 2020: Der Bozen-Krimi (TV Series) - Enzo Saffione

== Selected radioplays ==
- 1977: Victor Hugo: Der letzte Tag eines Verurteilten – Editing und Director: Charles Benoit (Hörspiel – SR DRS)
- 1985: Mario Benedetti: Pedro und der Hauptmann – Director: Charles Benoit (SR DRS)
- 1989: Margaret Millar: Kannibalenherz – Director: Bernd Lau (Hörspiel – NDR)
- 1991: Adolf Schröder: Berger und Levin – Director: Bernd Lau (NDR)
- 1992: J. R. R. Tolkien: Der Herr der Ringe – Director: Bernd Lau (WDR + SWR)
- 1993: Tankred Dorst: Merlin oder das wüste Land (Sänger) – Director: Walter Adler (Hörspiel – MDR)
- 1994: Hanspeter Gschwend: Code-Execute – Director: Charles Benoit (SR DRS)
- 1996: Yasmina Reza: Kunst – Director: Christiane Ohaus – Hörspiel Radio Bremen
- 1997: Dirk Spelsberg: Going Home – Director: Norbert Schaeffer Hörspiel SDR
- 1999: Ken Follett: Die Säulen der Erde (Philip) – Director: Leonhard Koppelmann (Hörspiel (9 Teile) – WDR)
- 1999: Jack Kerouac: Am Schwimmbecken sitzen mit Blondinen – Editing und Director: Charles Benoit (SR DRS)
- 2000: Yasmina Reza: Drei Mal Leben – Director: Charles Benoit (SR DRS)
- 2002: Felix Thijssen: Cleopatra – Director: Norbert Schaeffer (WDR)
- 2003: Maud Tabachnik: Bellende Hunde beißen – Director: Martin Zylka (Hörspiel – WDR)
- 2003: Carlo Fruttero/Franco Lucentini: Die Farbe des Schicksals (Inzaghi) – Director: Hans Gerd Krogmann (Hörspiel – SWR)
- 2004: Daniel Danis: Kieselasche - Director: Ulrich Lampen (Deutschlandradio)
- 2005: Carlos Ruiz Zafón: Der Schatten des Windes – Director: Martin Zylka (WDR)
- 2005: Charlotte Bronte: Jane Eyre – Director: Christiane Ohaus – Hörspiel Radio Bremen
- 2005: Karlheinz Koinegg: Ritter Artus und die Ritter der Tafelrunde (Sir Bercilac) – Director: Angeli Backhausen (Kinderhörspiel (6 Teile) – WDR)
- 2006: Robert Harris: Pompeji – Editing/Director: Sven Stricker – Hörspiel Der Hörverlag
- 2008: James Graham Ballard: Karneval der Alligatoren – Editing/Director: Oliver Sturm Hörspiel – NDR
- 2008: Philippe Blasband: Die Zeugen – Director: Marguerite Gateau – Hörspiel (DKultur/SR)
- 2009: David Harrower: Blackbird – Director: Ulrich Lampen Hörspiel SWR
- 2009: Jürgen Fuchs: Magdalena – Director: Norbert Schaeffer Hörspiel WDR
- 2010: Tennessee Williams: Licht unter Tage – Director: Annette Kurth (WDR)
- 2012: Renate Görgen: Der hinkende Hund – Director: Alexander Schumacher – Hörspiel NDR
- 2012: Georg Heym: Der Irre – Director: Iris Drögekamp – Hörspiel SWR
- 2012: Urs Widmer: Das Ende vom Geld – Director: Ulrich Lampen (Hörspiel – HR)
- 2012: David Grossmann: Eine Frau flieht vor einer Nachricht – Director: Norbert Schaeffer (Hörspiel NDR)
- 2013: Jakob Arjouni: Bruder Kemal – Editing und Director: Alexander Schuhmacher (NDR)
- 2013: John Burnside: Fügung – Director: Iris Drögekamp (SWR)
- 2014: Andres Veiel: Das Himbeerreich – Director: Ulrich Lampen (Hörspiel – RBB/HR)
- 2014: Iris Drögekamp: Als mein Vater ein Busch wurde und ich meinen Namen verlor – Director: Iris Drögekamp (Kinderhörspiel – SWR)
- 2014: Natascha Wodin/Wolfgang Hilbig: Nachtgeschwister, provisorisch – Director: Ulrich Lampen (Hörspiel – MDR/DKultur)
- 2014: Tim O’Brien: Was sie trugen/The Things They Carried – Director: Harald Krewer (Hörspiel – DKultur)
- 2015: Andres Foulques: Der Schlachtenmaler – Director: Alexander Schumacher – Hörspiel NDR
- 2015: Joel Dicker: Die Wahrheit über den Fall Harry Quebert – Director: Leonard Koppelmann – Hörspiel NDR
- 2015: Michel Houellebecq: Unterwerfung – Director: Leonard Koppelmann – Hörspiel SWR
- 2016: Ingo Schulze: Augusto, der Richter. – Director: Ulrich Lampen, MDR/BR Hörspiel und Medienkunst.l.
- 2016: John Williams: Augustus – Director: Burkhard Schmid
- 2016: Steven Uhly: Königreich der Dämmerung – Director: Leonard Koppelmann
- 2018: Claude Simon: Das Pferd – Director: Ulrich Lampen
- 2018: Hilary Mantel: Brüder – Director: Walter Adler (WDR)
- 2019: Eingreifen, bevor die Nacht kommt – Director: Ullrich Lampen
- 2019: Staatsräte – Director: Frank Hertweck/Manfred Hess (SWR 2)
- 2019: Roter Glamour – Director: Beatrix Ackers (NDR)
- 2019: Toter Winkel – Director: Ullrich Lampen (NDR)
- 2019: Denn sie sterben jung – Director: Matthias Kapohl (NDR)

== Discography ==
- 1990: Vierzehnundeinviertel Jahr – Lieder von François Villon (Singer, Music: Frank and Stefan Wulff)
- 2003: François Villon
- 2003: Van Gogh. Briefe an seinen Bruder Theo
- 2003: Dostojewskij – Aufzeichnungen aus dem Kellerloch
- 2005: Christa-Maria Zimmermann: Gefangen im Packeis. Sprecher
- 2005: Das Wilde Herz (own songs)
- 2007: G. Simenon – Betty
- 2007: Baudelaire – Liebesgedichte
- 2008: Rilke – Liebesgedichte
- 2008: James Graham Ballard: Karneval der Alligatoren. Editing/Director: Oliver Sturm, NDR 2008.
- 2009: Deutsche Schauerballaden
- 2010: Baudelaire – Die Blumen des Bösen, Goldbek Rekords
- 2014: Sehnsucht (own songs)
- 2016: Louise (Francois Villon / Paul Zech)
- 2016: John Williams: Augustus – Role: Augustus – HR 2 2016

== Literature ==
- Christian Redl, in: Internationales Biographisches Archiv 10/2013 on 5 March 2013, in the Munzinger-Archiv

== Links ==
- Literature by and about Christian Redl in the German National Library catalogue
- Christian Redl at IMDb
- Christian Redl auf Filmmakers.de
