= Das Kleine Gespenst =

Das kleine Gespenst
- Film poster
- Directed by: Alain Gsponer
- Written by: Martin Ritzenhoff
- Based on: The Little Ghost by Otfried Preußler
- Starring: Uwe Ochsenknecht; Jonas Holdenrieder; Emily Kusche; Nico Hartung
- Edited by: Michael Schaerer
- Music by: Niki Reiser
- Distributed by: Universum Film; Buena Vista International Germany
- Release date: September 26, 2013
- Running time: 92 minutes
- Countries: Germany; Switzerland
- Language: German

Das kleine Gespenst (English: The Little Ghost. Swiss German: S’Chline Gspängst) is a 2013 German-Swiss children's film based on the children's book of the same name by Otfried Preußler. The film was released in two language versions: German and Swiss German.

== Release ==
The German premiere was on 14 October 2013, at the Schlingel International Film Festival in Chemnitz. The Swiss dialect version was released on 26 September 2013, in the cinemas of German-speaking Switzerland. The theatrical release in Germany was on 7 November 2013. The German-language DVD and Blu-ray were released on 11 April 2014.
