= Tough Enough (2006 film) =

Knallhart en:Tough Enough
- DVD cover
- Directed by: Detlev Buck
- Produced by: Cluas Boje
- Starring: David Kross; Jenny Elvers; Erhan Emre; Oktay Özdemir; Kida Ramadan
- Cinematography: Kolja Brandt
- Edited by: Dirk Grau
- Music by: Bert Wrede
- Production companies: Dogwoof; Boje Buck
- Distributed by: Delphi Filmverleih
- Release date: 9 March 2006
- Running time: 98 min.
- Country: Germany
- Language: German

Tough Enough (German title: Knallhart) is a German film directed by Detlev Buck, based on the novel Knallhart by Gregor Tessnow and released in 2006. Main actors are David Kross and Jenny Elvers. The screenplay is written by Gregor Tessnow and Zoran Drvenkar.

== Plot ==
"When Miriam splits up with her wealthy lover, she and her 15-year-old son Michael have to move from posh Zehlendorf to run-down Berlin-Neukölln. The boy finds friends in his new neighborhood, but at school he is victimized and pressed for money by Erol and his gang. Handing over money from a burglary rather serves to encourage the bullies instead of warding them off, so Michael is desperately looking for a better solution."

== Cast ==
- David Kross - Michael Polischka
- Jenny Elvers - Miriam Polischka
- Erhan Emre - Hamal
- Oktay Özdemir - Erol
- Kida Khodr Ramadan - Barut
- Arnel Tači - Crille
- Kai Michael Müller - Matze
- Hans Löw - Kommissar Gerber
- Jan Henrik Stahlberg - Dr. Klaus Peters
- Amy Mußul - Lisa
- Georg Friedrich - Holger Hagenbeck

== See also ==
- Rage (2006)
