= The Little Ghost =

1966 children's book by Otfried Preußler

- First edition cover
- Author: Otfried Preußler
- Original title: Das kleine Gespenst
- Illustrator: Franz Josef Tripp
- Language: German
- Publication date: January 1, 1966

The Little Ghost is a 1966 children's book written by Otfried Preußler with illustrations from Franz Josef Tripp. It was published by Thielemann publisher and was translated to 44 languages. It is one of the most famous books of the German children and youth literature.

== Plot summary ==
The Little Ghost lives in Eulenstein, a former castle now converted into a museum overlooking the city of Eulenberg. Its best friend is an eagle owl named Mr. Schuhu, who lives in a hollow tree on the castle grounds. The Little Ghost becomes increasingly curious about the world in the waking hours, and just once wants to see it in bright daylight. However, all its tries to stay awake after the witching hour fail, and Mr. Schuhu also discourages this notion due to personal bad experience.

One day, after the Little Ghost has given up all hope, it suddenly awakes at noon and not at midnight. While exploring the day-lit castle, it suddenly encounters a school class. While it tries to flee from them, it gets hit by a sunbeam and suddenly changes its color from white to black. Afterwards, it jumps into the castle well and escapes to the sewer system of Eulenburg. Due to the large amount of pipes of the channel system, it cannot find its way back home to the castle, although it opens every channel output and causes a lot of panic among the inhabitants of Eulenberg, who start to call the Little Ghost Schwarzer Unbekannter ("Black Stranger").

Finally, after two weeks of vain searching, the Little Ghost causes a disaster during the 325th anniversary of the siege of Eulenberg by a Swedish army under the command of General Torstenson, believing that the General came back after the Little Ghost had frightened him away so long ago. After plunging the festival into chaos, it sleeps in the cellar of an apothecary, where it overhears the pharmacist's children talking about the busted festival the next day. Upon realizing its mistake, the Little Ghost asks the children for help, whereupon the three go to Castle Eulenstein to speak with Mr. Schuhu. After some deliberation, Mr. Schuhu blames the town hall clock for the unfortunate coincidence, as every ghost has to obey the chime of a specific clock, and concludes that there must have been some work done on it, causing it to sound twelve hours late from its normal schedule.

After the Little Ghost and the children have sent a letter of apology to the mayor of Eulenberg and the town's master watchmaker has adjusted the clock back to its former cycle, the Little Ghost finally wakes up at night and is able to return home. While reuniting with Mr. Schuhu, it gets hit by a moon beam and finally its color changes back to white, sending it dancing happily around the castle's walls.

== Characters ==
- The Little Ghost – The Little Ghost is a friendly night ghost and the story's main protagonist. During the day it sleeps in an oak coffer in the attic of Castle Eulenstein. Normally, The Little Ghost is very peaceful and does not harm anybody, except if somebody annoys it, like the Swedish General Torsten Torstenson. Otherwise, the Little Ghost is very helpful, curious and friendly. It owns a ring of thirteen keys which, when brandished, open any door it wishes to open.
- Mister Schuhu – Mr. Schuhu, an eagle-owl, is the best friend of the Little Ghost and lives in a hollow oak on the castle hill. As an old and wise bird, the eagle-owl insists that everybody should talk respectfully to it and it always has some good advice for the Little Ghost. Both the Little Ghost and Mr. Schuhu spend their time telling stories to each other.
- General Torsten Torstenson – The Swedish general Torsten Torstenson (who is based on Lennart Torstensson) besieged the castle and the city of Eulenberg 325 years ago. As the Little Ghost could not sleep during the day due to the loud noise of the Swedish cannons, it frightened the general so badly that he terminated the siege and left the castle and the city with his army the next day. A portrait of Torstenson still remains in the knight hall of the castle, as a reminder of his siege, and once in a while the Little Ghost speaks to it. Furthermore, the siege is remembered annually in Eulenberg with a huge festival.
- The Children of the Pharmacist – Eleven-year-old Herbert and his siblings, nine-year-old twins Jutta and Günther, end up befriending the Little Ghost and helping it to find its way back home to the castle after it ruins the 325th anniversary festival of the Swedish siege.
- Kriminaloberwachtmeister Holzinger - A member of the Eulenberg police force (with his rank roughly translating as "Criminal Police Senior Watch Master"), and the closest thing the Little Ghost has as an antagonist in the story. Holzinger is repeatedly tasked with investigating the Little Ghost's antics, especially during its time as the Schwarze Unbekannte, but due to his inexperience in dealing with ghosts, he never succeeds in capturing it.

== Origin ==
When Otfried Preußler was a child, his grandmother Dora told him stories very often. One of these stories was about a White Lady who predicted births and deaths in the family of her descendants and who moreover protected her home very often. Once, the white lady closed away the Swedish General Torsten Torstenson from the castle of her father, by shooing him out of his bed, giving him a telling off, while he was only wearing his night clothes and begging for mercy. Preußler always kept this scene in mind, and while he was writing the book of the history of the white lady, the white lady converted to the Little Ghost.

== Editions ==
The original Thienemann edition was later published with different front pages and with different publishers, like the German Bücherbund, the Büchergilde Gutenberg, Bertelsmann Lesering (RM book and media) and with its successor Club Bertelsmann.

The original illustrations from Franz Joseph Tripp were used for the international publishing. However, some editions were published with new illustrations on the front page, like e. g. the Spanish version El pequeño fantasma or some Russian versions from Malenkoe Prividenie. The Dutch version Het spookje was completely new illustrated by Ingrid Schubert.

In the year 2013, in which Preußler celebrated his 90th birthday, Thienemann published two new editions of The Little Ghost. One edition was published in color for the first time and available as an e-book, together with his other books The Little Water Sprite, The Little Witch and the three volumes of The Robber Hotzenplotz. Mathias Weber, an illustrator, colored the original black and white illustrations, with which he made the dream of the author come true. The other new edition, called Das kleine Gespenst – Das Buch zum Kinofilm (English: The Little Ghost – the book of the movie) was published. It was published together with the movie at Preußler's birthday. However, the book differs from the movie and has the same content as the original book edition, apart from the design of the front page. Unfortunately, Otfried Preußler died in the beginning of 2013, so that he did not see neither the new editions of his book nor the movie.

For the 50th anniversary of The Little Ghost, Susanne Preußler-Bitsch, Otfried Preußler's daughter, published a picture book Bilderbuch with the title The Little Ghost - Tohuwabohu in the castle Eulenstei. It was Otfried Preußler's idea. Daniel Napp illustrated the book.

== Awards ==
- 1967: in the selected list for the German Children's Literature Award
- 1988: IBBY Honour List for the Greek translation

== Adaptations ==
=== Audio Media ===
In the 1970s the company Phonogram published a very famous audio version Hörspiel of the book on Phonograph record and cassettes under its label Record label Philips and Fontana, which at present is still available with the successor company Universal Music with the label Karussell. The voice of the Little Ghost is from Christa Häussler, the storyteller has the voice from Hans Baur. In 1996 the audio play received a Gold Record award Gold. A new edition, which was published by Karussell with the label Spectrum Junior, reached the platinum status in 1998. In 2000 a sing book with the title “ Hui-Huh! Little Ghost! – Funny and fantastic ghost songs” was published to the previous mentioned version. In 2008 a new version was published, consisting of two new versions of the audio with Michael Habeck, speaking as The Little Ghost and Peter Strieback, speaking as the story teller. The first part received the Golden Vinyl Record (Kids Award) in 2014. Der erste Teil wurde 2014 mit der Goldenen Schallplatte (Kids-Award) ausgezeichnet.

In 2008, the audio editorial from the WDR WDR published a further audio play, with Fritzi Haberlandt as storyteller, Jens Wawrczeck as the little ghost and Friedhelm Ptok as the eagle-owl Mr. Schuhu. In 2011 the same editorial published the audio book Hörbuch. Nora Tschirner reads the uncut version.

Together with the movie an extra audio play was published in 2013, where the actors gave their voice to the same characters that they played in the movie.

In 2016, the audio editorial published the audio play “The Little Ghost – Tohuwabohu in the castle Eulenstein”, with the voices from Anna Thalbach, speaking The Little Ghost, Susanne Preußler- Bitsch, speaking the storyteller and Santiago Ziesmer speaking as the eagle-owl Mr. Schuhu. The audio CD corresponds to the picture book, from Preußler and Susanne Preußler-Bitsch.

=== Learning Media ===
In 1996 Ursula Hänggi, from the publisher Verlag an der Ruhr, published a literature card index according to the children's book from Otfried Preußler. Among other things the card index contains worksheets, language and spelling games as well as a riddle for language teaching.

In 1998 and 2005, two different audio plays, with the title “Learning English with The Little Ghost” were published by Karussell. The version published in 2005 received the gold record (Kids Award) in 2014. Two French version were published in 2002 and 2005. Furthermore, in 2005 the same publisher, published an English audio play.

The Thienemann publisher published a book “ The Little Ghost – Learning English with The Little Ghost” in which difficult and not often used words are explained at the end of every chapter.

In 2004 Edizioni Lang published a further learn book with the title “The Little Ghost – words and pictures” to learn Italian.

In 2008 a pocket book for schools was published. In the same year, Björn Bauch published a book for teaching lessons with the title “The Little Ghost – Comments and Copy templates for teaching lessons for the second and third grade”.

=== Films ===
In 1969, The Little Ghost was released as a two-part puppet film on television. Rudolf Fischer and Albrecht Roser, who also directed the film, were among others the puppeteers.

Soviet television released the live action film Ghost from Eulenburg (Russian language: Привидение из города Ойленберга, Transliteration: Privideniye iz goroda Oylenberga), which is based on Preußler's book. Anatoly Ravikovitch directed the movie and acted as The Little Ghost in the movie.

In 1992, cartoonist Curt Linda produced the cartoon The Little Ghost with the voice from Elfriede Kuzmany, speaking The Little Ghost. Gustl Weishappel gave her voice to the eagle-owl.

In 2013, Universum Film released the film The Little Ghost, directed by Alain Gsponer. Anna Thalbach gave her voice to the animated little Ghost. Wolfgang Hess gave his voice to the eagle owl and Uwe Ochsenknecht acted as the mayor and the General Torsten Torstenson. Herbert Knaup acted the watch master maker Zifferle.

=== Games ===
In the 1970s, the Berliner Spielkarten GmbH published a Happy Families card game with the illustrations of Preußler's book.

Kai Haferkamp published a board game with the title The Little Ghost with the publisher Kosmos. In 2005 the memory game received the award of the best children game Kinderspiel des Jahres. In 2010 Haferkamp published a search game with the title “The Little Ghost – Souvenirs”.

In 2016, Haferkamp published three more games with the toy company Habermaaß. One game is a Puzzle with three motives from Preußler's book, furthermore they published a memory game with the title “ The Little Ghost – Race to the castle Eulenstein”. The third game is a 3D memory game, with the title “ The Little Ghost – haunting in Eulenstein”.

=== Theater ===
Otfried Preußler wrote a stage play of The Little Ghost. The premiere was in the theater in Rosenheim, in 1989. Since 1990, the publisher for children theater has all the performance rights. Among others, the Augsburger Puppet show Augsburger Puppenkiste and Gerhards Puppet theater performed the stage play.

Yevgeni Sitokhin directed a children opera corresponding to the book from Preußler. The premiere took place in the opera house in Graz Opernhaus Graz in 2011. Walther Soyka composed the music and the Libretto came from Bernhard Studlar. The Vienna Pocket opera produced it in cooperation with the Opera Graz.

== Literature ==
- Otfried Preußler, Franz Josef Tripp (Illustrator): Das kleine Gesepnst, 52nd edition, Thienemann, Stuttgart / Wien 2011 (first edition 1966), ISBN 978-3-522-11080-8
- The little ghost, illustrated by F.J. Tripp, translated from the German by Anthea Bell. Abelard-Schuman 1967; London: Andersen Press, 2013. ISBN 9781849397711
