= Daniel Steiner =

German actor and film director (born 1973)

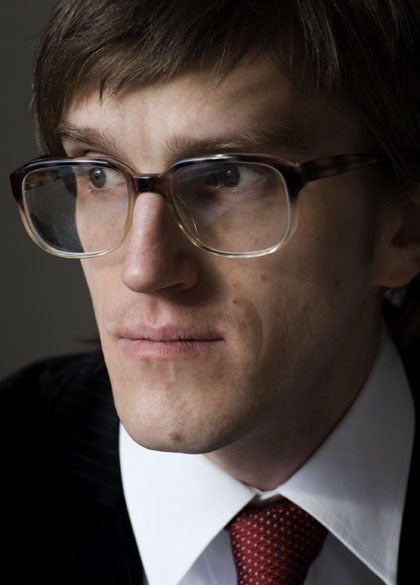
- Born: 1973 (age 51–52); Rheda, West Germany
- Occupation(s): Actor, film director
- Years active: 1998–present

Daniel Steiner (born 1973) is a German actor and film director.

== Life and career ==
Steiner was born in Rheda. In the 90s, he visited the University of Leeds, where he finished his Broadcasting study with a bachelor's degree. After he worked a few times as production assistant and made some Film & TV internships in England, Daniel Steiner began to study Commercial direction at the Film Academy Baden-Wuerttemberg in 1997. In 2003 Daniel Steiner finished his study with diploma.

Since 2002 Daniel Steiner works as independent director, writer and actor. He produced several web series and commercials for known products like Pringles or Kinder Chocolate. In addition he shot, for example, music videos for the German hip hop group Puppetmastaz or the German singer and musician Namosh (together with the German actor Nic Romm).

As actor Daniel Steiner participated in a few German blockbusters like Where Is Fred!? or Krabat.

He lives in Berlin.

== Selected filmography ==
- 2004: The Trixxer (Der Wixxer), (actor)
- 2004: Wilde Jungs (TV series), (actor)
- 2005: Our Charly (TV series), (actor)
- 2006: LadyLand (TV series with Anke Engelke), (actor)
- 2006: Where Is Fred!? (Wo ist Fred?), (actor)
- 2007: Vollidiot (actor)
- 2008: Krabat (actor)
- 2009: Short Cut to Hollywood (actor)
- 2009: Die ProSieben Märchenstunde (actor)
- 2010: Black Death (actor)
- 2014: Leipzig Homicide (TV series), (actor, appearance in various episodes since 2012)
- 2014: The Grand Budapest Hotel (actor)
- 2016: Bittersweet (Bittersüß), (actor)
