= Krabat (film) =

- Theatrical release poster
- Directed by: Marco Kreuzpaintner
- Written by: Marco Kreuzpaintner; Michael Gutmann
- Based on: The Satanic Mill by Otfried Preußler
- Produced by: Jakob Claussen; Uli Putz; Bernd Wintersperger; Thomas Wobke
- Starring: David Kross; Daniel Brühl; Christian Redl; Robert Stadlober; Paula Kalenberg; Daniel Steiner; Hanno Koffler
- Cinematography: Daniel Gottschalk
- Edited by: Hansjoerg Weissbrich
- Music by: Annette Focks
- Production companies: Claussen + Wöbke + Putz Filmproduktion; SevenPictures Film; B.A. Filmproduktion
- Distributed by: 20th Century Fox Germany
- Release dates: 7 September 2008 (Toronto International Film Festival); 9 October 2008 (Germany)
- Running time: 115 minutes
- Country: Germany
- Language: German
- Budget: $10 million
- Box office: $13,042,251

Krabat (German: [ˈkʁaːbat]) is a 2008 German fantasy film directed by Marco Kreuzpaintner from a screenplay by Michael Gutmann and Kreuzpaintner, based on Otfried Preußler's 1971 novel of the same name. The plot is about a boy, Krabat (played by David Kross), who learns black magic from a sorcerer (played by Christian Redl). A DVD-Video encode of the film is distributed in the United Kingdom as Krabat and the Legend of the Satanic Mill.

It premiered in the US at the Seattle International Film Festival in 2009.

== Plot ==
When the Plague sweeps across Europe after the Thirty Years' War a boy named Krabat (David Kross) is left without family, food, or hope. An old mill keeper takes him in as an apprentice. Eleven other boys are working at the mill, and Krabat develops a friendship with one of them, a young man named Tonda (Daniel Brühl). Soon, Krabat learns that the apprentices are also taught dark sorcery by the master. One of the rituals (during Easter) leads to an excursion to the nearby village Schwarzkollm where Krabat meets a young girl and falls in love with her. There, Tonda also talks to one of the girls; both seem to be in love with each other. Later, Tonda warns Krabat that the master must never know the name of his girl.

One day, while protecting the nearby village from soldiers, Tonda makes an error and his girl's name (Worschula) is revealed to the master. The next day, Worschula turns up in the creek, dead. Krabat mistakenly blames Lyschko, another apprentice. Tonda becomes a recluse and anticipates the end of the year. Krabat's first Silvester (New Year's Eve) brings to light the true horror of the mill. Every Silvester, one of the boys must be sacrificed so the master may remain young. And so at midnight, Krabat's best friend Tonda is viciously murdered, and when Krabat tries to help him he is stopped by the other boys who tell him that "there is nothing we can do". Before he dies, Tonda tells Krabat there is another boy in the mill Krabat can confide in. He also tells Krabat to take two sacks of flour to the village.

Krabat is distraught over Tonda's death but does as he is told. Bringing the sacks of flour to a tree near the village, Krabat once again meets the girl he first met while protecting the village. He is in love but does not let the girl tell him her name, fearing for her life. Instead, he calls her Kantorka (Choir leader). During the ritual at Easter night, he goes to the village to meet her, this time along with a boy called Juro who appears to be mentally disabled and not able to learn the trade or properly do magic. When Juro tells Krabat that they must leave and go back to the mill, Krabat insists that he will stay with Kantorka. Juro then uses powerful magic to convince Krabat to come back with him, revealing that he is in truth highly intelligent and powerful, even able to change the weather. Juro promises Krabat that he will help him escape the master, and tells him that his girl must ask for him on Silvester to set him free. Krabat tells Kantorka that she must do so, and she agrees and gives Krabat a lock of her hair, telling him to have another boy deliver it to her when the time is right.

When Krabat returns, a series of climactic events are set in motion.

== Cast ==
- David Kross as Krabat
- Daniel Brühl as Tonda
- Christian Redl as The Master
- Robert Stadlober as Lyschko
- Paula Kalenberg as Kantorka
- Hanno Koffler as Juro
- Anna Thalbach as Worschula
- Charly Hübner as Michal
- Moritz Grove as Merten
- Tom Wlaschiha as Hanzo
- Sven Hönig as Andrusch
- Stefan Haschke as Staschko
- David Fischbach as Lobosch
- Daniel Steiner as Petar
- Tom Lass as Kubo
- Daniel Fripath as Kito
- Ionuț Băiaș as Baro
- Mac Steinmeier as Godfather Death
- Carmen Ungureanu as Krabat's Mother
- Otto Sander as the narrator (voice only)

== Production ==
In March 1986, The NeverEnding Story producer Dieter Geissler developed a package of science fiction and fantasy films catering to the same tastes as The Neverending Story with one of the films being an adaptation of the Otfried Preußler novel Krabat for release sometime in the Summer of 1987. Krabat had been previously adapted twice before in 1975 with the East German film The Black Mill and in 1977 as a West German-Czechoslovak co-production titled Krabat – The Sorcerer's Apprentice.

In December 2001, it was reported that German production company Filmtime, motivated by major films such as Harry Potter and the Philosopher's Stone and The Lord of the Rings: The Fellowship of the Ring, The screenplay, under the title of Krabat and the Black Mill, was set to be written by Jochen Breitenstein and Sandra Hoerger with plans to shoot the film in English using an international cast. The project ultimately never came to fruition and was shelved by Filmtime.

In February 2006, it was reported that Claussen+Woebke was making another attempt at a Krabat film and had set Marco Kreuzpaintner after he had previously helmed the successful film Summer Storm for the studio.

In October of that year, it was reported that production on the film had begun as part of a five picture deal between Claussen+Woebke and 20th Century Fox Germany. Production took place in Romania with shooting at Castel Film Romania starring Daniel Brühl and was shot as a German language production.

== Reception ==
Flickering Myth reviewed the DVD release of the film, in which he wrote: "Krabat has great potential even though the film doesn’t fully realize it. It fails to explore some interesting story elements and is a little slow on pace. However, it focuses really well on the themes of temptation; with the lure of black magic and power, and friendship; with the sense of brotherhood and companionship Krabat experiences. It’s an enjoyable dark fantasy that has a Grimm fairytale-like feel to it and effective performances from the lead actors."

== Awards ==
Krabat was nominated for the Deutscher Filmpreis in 2009 in the categories Best Production Design, Best Music and Best Sound Design.

== See also ==
- Krabat – The Sorcerer's Apprentice (1978)
