= The Human Machine =

Studio album by Master
- Released: 26 April 2010 (Europe); 25 May 2010 (North America)
- Recorded: Shaark Studios, Bzenec, Czechia
- Genre: Death metal
- Length: 45:51
- Label: Pulverised (CD); Doomentia (vinyl)
- Producer: Paul Speckmann

Master chronology
| Slaves to Society (2007) | The Human Machine (2010) | The New Elite (2012) |

The Human Machine is the ninth studio album by American-Czech death metal band Master. It was released on 26 April 2010, through Pulverised Records. The album was available in a standard version and an alternate slipcase version with different artwork.

Professional ratings
Review scores
| Source | Rating |
|---|---|
| Metal Hammer (UK) | 7/10 |

== Track listing ==
- All songs written by Paul Speckmann, except tracks 3, 8, and 10 (lyrics: Speckmann; music: Aleš Nejezchleba)

| No. | Title | Length |
|---|---|---|
| 1. | "The Human Machine" | 5:17 |
| 2. | "It's What Your Country Can Do for You" | 6:10 |
| 3. | "Twisted Truth" | 3:14 |
| 4. | "True Color" | 5:39 |
| 5. | "Suppress Free Thinking" | 5:47 |
| 6. | "A Replica of Invention" | 3:24 |
| 7. | "Faceless Victims Expelled" | 3:25 |
| 8. | "Worship the Sun" | 4:04 |
| 9. | "The Lack of Space" | 3:55 |
| 10. | "Impale to Kill" | 4:56 |
| Total length: | | 45:51 |

== Personnel ==
Master

- Paul Speckmann – bass, vocals
- Aleš Nejezchleba – guitars
- Zdeněk Pradlovský – drums

Guest

- Vlasta Killy Mahdal – backing vocals on "The Human Machine", "True Color", "Faceless Victims Expelled", and "Worship the Sun"

Production

- Eliran Kantor – cover art
- Petr Nejezchleba – engineering
- Pavel Hlavica – engineering
- Paul Speckmann – production
