= The New Elite =

Studio album by Master
- Released: July 5, 2012 (Europe); August 14, 2012 (North America)
- Recorded: Shaark Studios, Bzenec, Czech Republic
- Genre: Death metal
- Length: 44:25
- Label: Pulverised (CD); Doomentia (vinyl)
- Producer: Petr Nejezchleba

Master chronology
The Human Machine (2010)	The New Elite (2012)	The Witch Hunt (2013)

Alternate cover
- Vinyl version

Professional ratings
Review scores
Source	Rating
Allmusic	3.0/5 stars
Metal Underground	4/5 stars

The New Elite is the tenth studio album by American-Czech death metal band Master. It was released on July 5, 2012, through Pulverised Records.

== Track listing ==
All tracks are written by Paul Speckmann

No.	Title	Length
1.	"The New Elite"	3:32
2.	"Rise Up and Fight"	4:25
3.	"Remove the Knife" (Speckmann, Aleš Nejezchleba)	3:50
4.	"Smile as You're Told"	3:31
5.	"Redirect the Evil" (Speckmann, Nejezchleba)	4:04
6.	"Out of Control"	3:49
7.	"As Two Worlds Collide"	4:49
8.	"New Reforms"	2:57
9.	"Guide Yourself" (Speckmann, Nejezchleba)	3:58
10.	"Souls to Dissuade"	4:27
11.	"Twist of Fate"	5:03
Total length:		44:25

== Personnel ==
Master

- Paul Speckmann – bass, vocals
- Aleš "Alex 93" Nejezchleba – guitars
- Zdeněk "Zdenál" Pradlovský – drums

Guest

- Martin Mikulec – solo guitar on "Guide Yourself"

Production

- Mark Bridgeman – CD artwork
- Petr Nejezchleba – engineering, mastering, mixing
- Raúl González – vinyl artwork
