= Master (American band) =

American-Czech death metal band

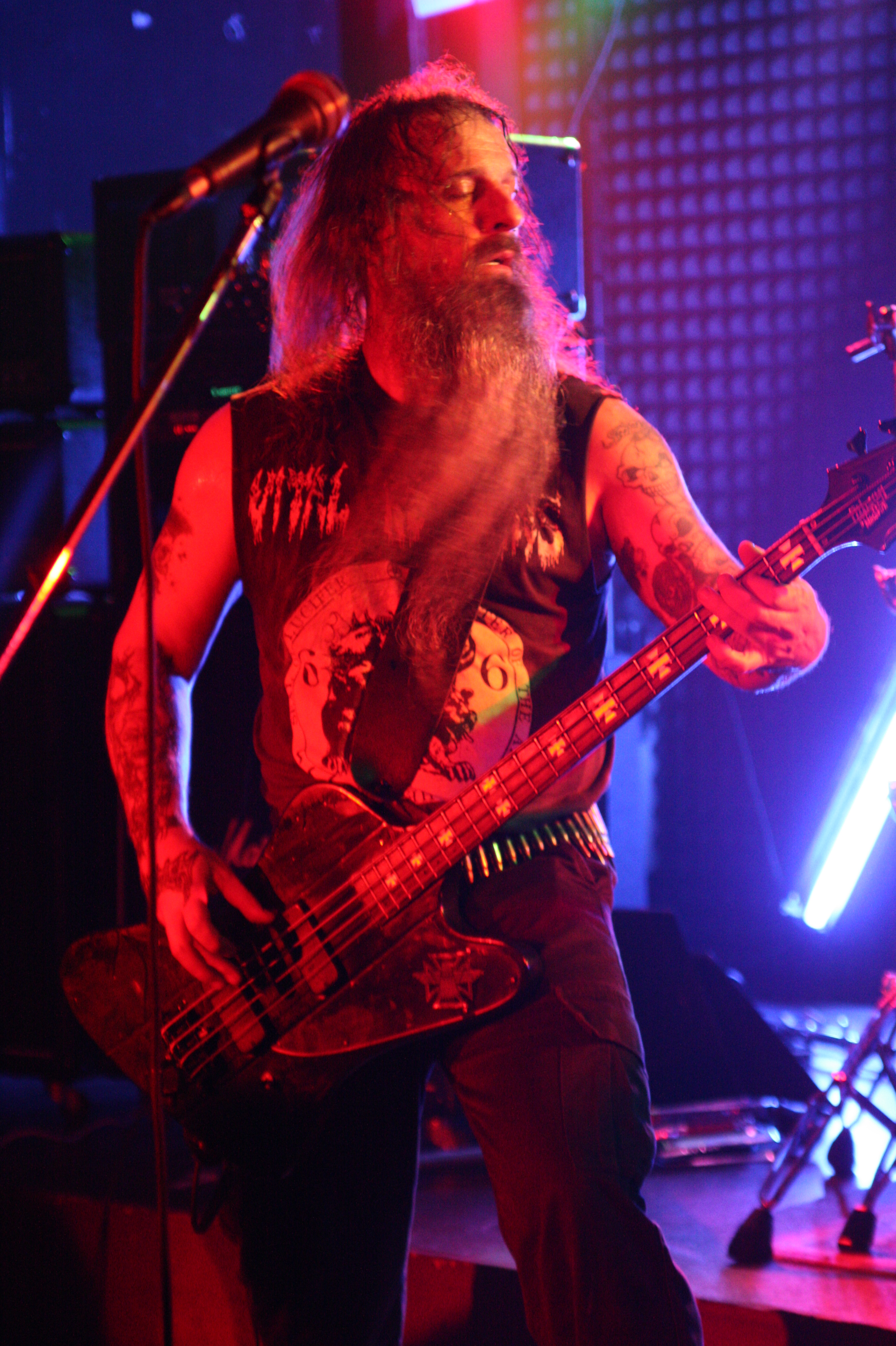
- Frontman Paul Speckmann in 2009

Background information
- Also known as: Death Strike; Speckmann Project
- Origin: Chicago, Illinois, US
- Genres: Death metal; thrash metal
- Years active: 1983–present
- Labels: Pulverised; Displeased; From Beyond; Ibex Moon; Moonlight; Nuclear Blast; Pavement; System Shock; Twilight; Dead Center
- Members: Paul Speckmann; Aleš Nejezchleba; Peter Bajči
- Past members: Chris Mittelbrun; Bill Schmidt; Aaron Nickeas; Jim Martinelli; Zdeněk Pradlovský
- Website: https://speckmetal.net/ http://master-speckmetal.net

Master is an American death metal band led by Paul Speckmann. Formed in Chicago, it later relocated to Uherské Hradiště, in Czechia.

== History ==
Speckmann formed the group as Death Strike in 1983, following the demise of his earlier band, Warcry. In 1985, Speckmann renamed the band Master and signed with Combat Records. An album was recorded but shelved due to issues with the label. The recording sessions for the album were released in 2003 by Displeased Records as Unreleased 1985 Album. In 1990, the band signed with Nuclear Blast, which had Speckmann's other group, Abomination, under contract. Master released their debut album, Master, in 1990. It was recorded with guitarist Chris Mittelbrun and drummer Bill Schmidt. Nuclear Blast was not pleased with the album, and it was re-recorded with drummer Aaron Nickeas and guitarist Jim Martinelli and released as Speckmann Project in 1991.

Master published On the Seventh Day God Created... Master in 1992, featuring lead guitarist Paul Masvidal. Collection of Souls was released in 1993, but Master did not resign with Nuclear Blast. The band went on hiatus, searching for a new label. They released Faith Is in Season in 1998, through Pavement Music. Speckmann focused on other projects, including the reformed Abomination. In 1999, he joined Czech death metal band Krabathor and relocated to Czechia.

Master released Let's Start a War in 2002 on System Shock and followed up with Spirit of the West in 2004. They signed with German label Twilight Vertrieb and issued Four More Years of Terror in 2005. Seven albums have been released since: Slaves to Society (2007), The Human Machine (2010), The New Elite (2012), The Witch Hunt (2013), An Epiphany of Hate (2016), Vindictive Miscreant (2018), and Saints Dispelled (2024).

The band performed at the Milwaukee Metal Fest in June 2026.

== Band members ==
Current

- Paul Speckmann – bass, vocals
- Aleš "Alex 93" Nejezchleba – guitars
- Peter Bajči – drums

Past

- Chris Mittelbrun – guitars
- Bill Schmidt – drums
- Aaron Nickeas – drums
- Jim Martinelli – guitars
- Zdeněk "Zdenál" Pradlovský – drums

== Discography ==
=== Studio albums ===
- Master (1990)
- On the Seventh Day God Created... Master (1992)
- Collection of Souls (1993)
- Faith Is in Season (1998)
- Let's Start a War (2002)
- The Spirit of the West (2004)
- Four More Years of Terror (2005)
- Slaves to Society (2007)
- The Human Machine (2010)
- The New Elite (2012)
- The Witch Hunt (2013)
- An Epiphany of Hate (2016)
- Vindictive Miscreant (2018)
- Saints Dispelled (2024)
- Among the Seeds of Death (2026)

=== Live albums ===
- Live in Mexico City (2000)
- Mangled Dehumanization (2012)
- Live Assault (DVD – 2013)
- Live (2018)
- God of Thunder (2019)
- Alive in Athens (2020)

=== EPs ===
- Follow Your Savior (2001)
- Widower (2019)
- 40 Years and Killing (2025)

=== Compilations ===
- Masterpieces (2005)
- Command Your Fate (The Demo Collection) (2017)
- Best of (2018)

=== Splits ===
- Master / Abomination with Abomination (1990)
- Master / Excision with Excision (1996)
- Imperial Anthems with Pentagram Chile (2013)
- Decay into Inferior Conditions with Dehuman (2013)

=== Demos ===
- 85 Demo (1985)
- Demo '91 (1991)
- Final Word (1995)
- Everything Is Rotten (2005)
