= Krabat – The Sorcerer's Apprentice =

The Sorcerer's Apprentice
- Czech DVD cover
- Directed by: Karel Zeman
- Screenplay by: Karel Zeman
- Based on: Krabat by Otfried Preußler
- Produced by: Karel Hutěčka
- Starring: Jaroslav Moučka
- Narrated by: Luděk Munzar
- Cinematography: Bohuslav Pikhart; Zdeněk Krupa
- Edited by: Ivan Matouš
- Music by: Frantíšek Belfin
- Distributed by: Ústřední půjčovna filmů
- Release dates: 1 March 1978 (Czechoslovakia); 24 March 1978 (West Germany); 7 September 1979 (East Germany)
- Running time: 73 minutes
- Countries: Czechoslovakia; West Germany; East Germany
- Language: Czech

Krabat – The Sorcerer's Apprentice (Czech: Čarodějův učeň) is a 1978 Czechoslovak cutout animated dark fantasy film directed by Karel Zeman, based on the 1971 book Krabat by Otfried Preußler, and the Sorbian folk tale upon which the book is based. The name Krabat is derived from the word Croat.

== Plot ==
Krabat, a beggar boy in early 18th century Lusatia, is lured to become an apprentice to an evil, one-eyed sorcerer. Together with a number of other boys, he works at the sorcerer's mill under slave-like conditions while learning black magic, such as guising himself as a raven and other animals. Every Christmas one of the boys has to face the master in a magical duel of life and death, where the boy never stands a chance because the master is the only person who is allowed to use his secret grimoire: The Koraktor, or the Force of Hell.

One Easter while performing an annual ritual near a small village, Krabat meets a girl and falls in love, but has to keep the romance secret in order to protect her. After witnessing his friends one after one being helplessly slaughtered by the master every Christmas, Krabat starts to sneak up at night to study the forbidden book. On the last page of the book, Krabat finds a phrase saying: "Love is stronger than any spell." This is used when he ultimately has to defeat his master for the sake of love.

== Voice cast ==
Role	Czech version	West German version	East German version
Krabat / Narrator	Luděk Munzar	Christian Brückner	Joachim Siebenschuh
Master	Jaroslav Moučka	Friedrich Schütter	Horst Kempe

== See also ==
- Krabat (2008 film)
