= Krabat (novel) =

1971 fantasy novel by Otfried Preußler

- Author: Otfried Preußler
- Original title: Krabat
- Translator: Anthea Bell
- Language: German
- Genre: Children's novel
- Publisher: Arena Verlag
- Publication date: 1971
- Publication place: Germany
- English publication date: 1972
- ISBN: 978-1590177785 (English)

Krabat (German: [ˈkʁaːbat]) is a 1971 fantasy novel about the eponymous Sorbian folk hero, written by Otfried Preußler. The book deals primarily with black magic and the lure of evil. Other themes include friendship, love, and death. It won the Deutscher Jugendliteraturpreis (Prize for Literature for Young People) in 1972.

== Plot ==
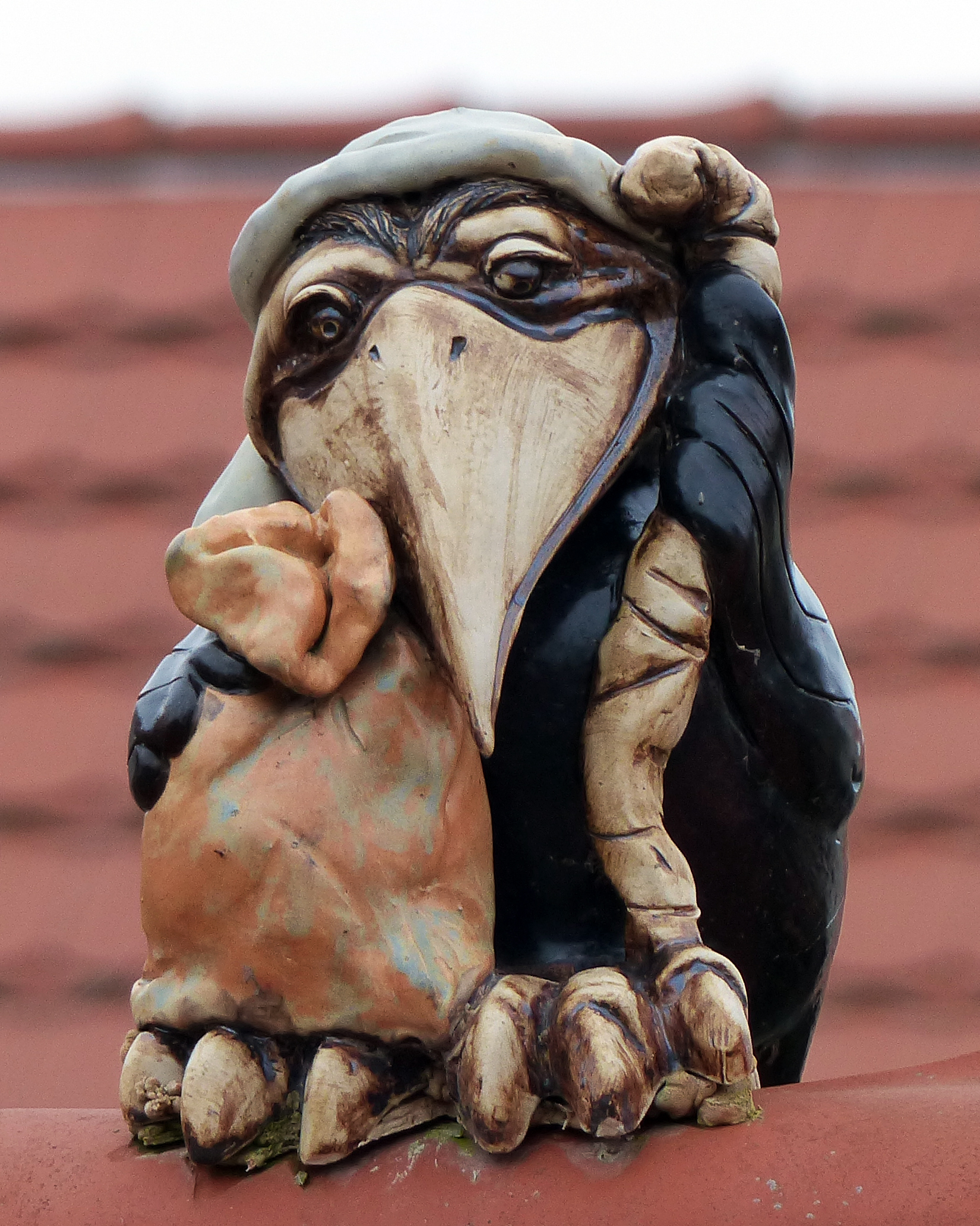
A figurine of Krabat as a raven in Schwarzkollm.

Set in the beginning of the 18th century during the Great Northern War, the story follows the life of Krabat, a 14-year-old Wendish beggar boy living in the eastern part of Saxony. For three consecutive nights, he is called to a watermill near the village Schwarzkollm through a dream. Upon heeding the call and arriving at the mill, he begins his apprenticeship as a miller's man. He soon joins the secret brotherhood, composed of journeymen and apprentices, and discovers that the skill he is meant to learn through this apprenticeship is black magic. The first magic powers Krabat acquires are rather harmless, such as the ability to turn himself into a raven. Other peculiarities of this watermill include the lack of any outside visitors, including farmers who would have brought grain. The only visitor to the mill is one Goodman, who may be the devil, although this is never made explicit.

The senior journeyman Tonda, Krabat's best friend and older brother figure, dies, ostensibly of an accident, on New Year's Eve in Krabat's first year at the mill. Tonda offers strangely little resistance to his own death. Krabat's suspicions of foul play are further reinforced when another journeyman and friend, Michal, dies the following New Year's Eve. He soon realizes that the master is bound in a pact to the Goodman: the master must sacrifice one journeyman every year on New Year's Eve, or perish himself.

In Krabat's third year at the mill, the new student turns out to be Lobosch, a fellow beggar boy with whom Krabat used to travel before following the master's call to the mill. To Lobosch he becomes a similar "older brother" figure as Tonda was to him in his first year: he helps Lobosch regularly by mindering his pain in secret and helps him with the hard work, gives him advice and consults him when needed.

Wishing to avenge his friends' death, Krabat secretly trains to increase his mental strength so he can see eye to eye with the master. His quest is aided by Juro, a journeyman skilled in magic who has been playing the fool to avoid the master's attention. Whilst the two leave the mill at easter to receive "the marking" (a process where the brotherhood members have to spend a night outside at a place where someone died forcefully, mark each other with the sign and vow to the master to serve him) Krabat wanders out of himself to see the and speak to his long sought love. A girl from the nearby village, a church singer, “Kantorka”, whose name is never mentioned (“Kantorka” meaning just ‘girl chorister’). Krabat learns that to end the spell, his lover must challenge the master for him; then whoever loses the challenge, the master or the two lovers, will die. The master offers Krabat another solution: He will retire and let Krabat inherit the mill, along with the pact to the Goodman; but Krabat refuses to perpetuate the evil pact. So the challenge goes ahead, and the girl's task is to distinguish Krabat from the rest of the journeymen, all of them are standing in a row, while she is - unexpectedly - blindfolded. (They had expected him to transfer them into ravens, but that she could still see.) Nevertheless, she manages to pick Krabat out by the fact that he fears mainly for her life, while the others fear mainly for their own. Ultimately, she rescues Krabat from death, and they and the journeymen escape the mill. The master is left to die in the burning mill on New Year's Eve, while the survivors lose all their magic powers and are now simple millers who have to provide for themselves through normal hard work.

== Characters ==
The main characters are:

- Krabat
- Tonda
- The Master
- The Goodman
- Juro
- Witko
- Michal
- The girl ("Die Kantorka" in the original German)

The characters of this novel provide a stark distinction between good and evil. Krabat, his love interest (the girl), Tonda, Juro, Witko and Michal stand for the side of the good, whereas the master of the mill, the Goodman and the one journeyman who betrays his brothers stand for the bad.

== Interpretation ==
Although the story is based on a Wendish (Sorbian) folk legend that Preußler heard as a child, Preußler also felt it told the story of himself, his generation, and all young people who encounter power and its temptations and get ensnarled by it.

== Critical reception ==
The original English translation, The Satanic Mill was reviewed for The New York Times in 1973, the novelist Isaac Bashevis Singer praised the rich and detailed descriptions of the working of the mill. However, he was critical of the realism of the detail descriptions not matching the mysticism of the supernatural elements. He wrote that the material may have suited a shorter form and better explanation of the character's motivations and individuality.

Later reviews have been more admiring. In Strange Horizons, Erin Horáková described the story as one where people participate in systems of harm without fully grasping their own role. Her review draws attention to the year of publication, 1971, against the background of post-war West Germany with elements of the story echoing fascist and communist work projects. In the 2014 New York Review Books edition for Words Without Borders, Emma Garman argued that the novel was both timeless and original, standing up to today's examinations of children's and young adult fiction as being both entertaining and a commentary on human capacity to submit to, and resist, corruption.

== Publication history in English ==
Anthea Bell's English translation was first published in 1972 by Abelard-Schuman as The Satanic Mill. Subsequent editions of this translation have been published under various titles, including:

- The Satanic Mill (Macmillan, 1973; hardcover)
- The Satanic Mill (Knight Books, 1974; paperback)
- The Satanic Mill (Peter Smith Publisher, 1985; hardcover)
- The Satanic Mill (Collier Books, 1991; paperback)
- The Curse of the Darkling Mill (Gryphon House, 2000; paperback)
- Krabat: Legend of the Satanic Mill (The Friday Project, 2010; paperback)
- Krabat and the Sorcerer's Mill (New York Review Books, 2014; 2024), with cover art by Chris Kubica.

== Adaptations ==
The story was adapted into a 1978 Czech animated film, Čarodějův učeň (The Sorcerer's Apprentice), directed by Karel Zeman.

The band ASP started with a musical version of the story, in 12 parts, in 2006. In 2008 they finished the project with a 15-track album (on two CDs) called Zaubererbruder (i.e. "Sorcerer-Brother").

Marco Kreuzpaintner's film adaptation of Otfried Preußler's book, also named Krabat, was released in Germany on October 9, 2008.

The 1975 East German television film Die schwarze Mühle is based on a different novelization of the same folk tale by Jurij Brězan. It aired on Fernsehen der DDR starring Polish Actor Leon Niemczyk, dubbed for the GDR tv viewers by Norbert Christian, Monika Woytowicz, Herbert Köfer, Uwe Kockisch, and Ernst-Georg Schwill.

In 2017, a point and click video game titled “Krabat and the Secret of the Sorbian King” was released by publisher, Rapaki, for mobile platforms and partially funded by the Foundation for the Sorbian People with the goal of educating players about the titular hero.

== Other books ==
Krabat is also the main character of three novels, written by the Sorbian writer Jurij Brězan, published in 1968 (adapted into a film by East German state television in 1975), 1976 and 1993.

== See also ==
- Howl's Moving Castle
