= Otfried Preußler =

German children's author (1923–2013)

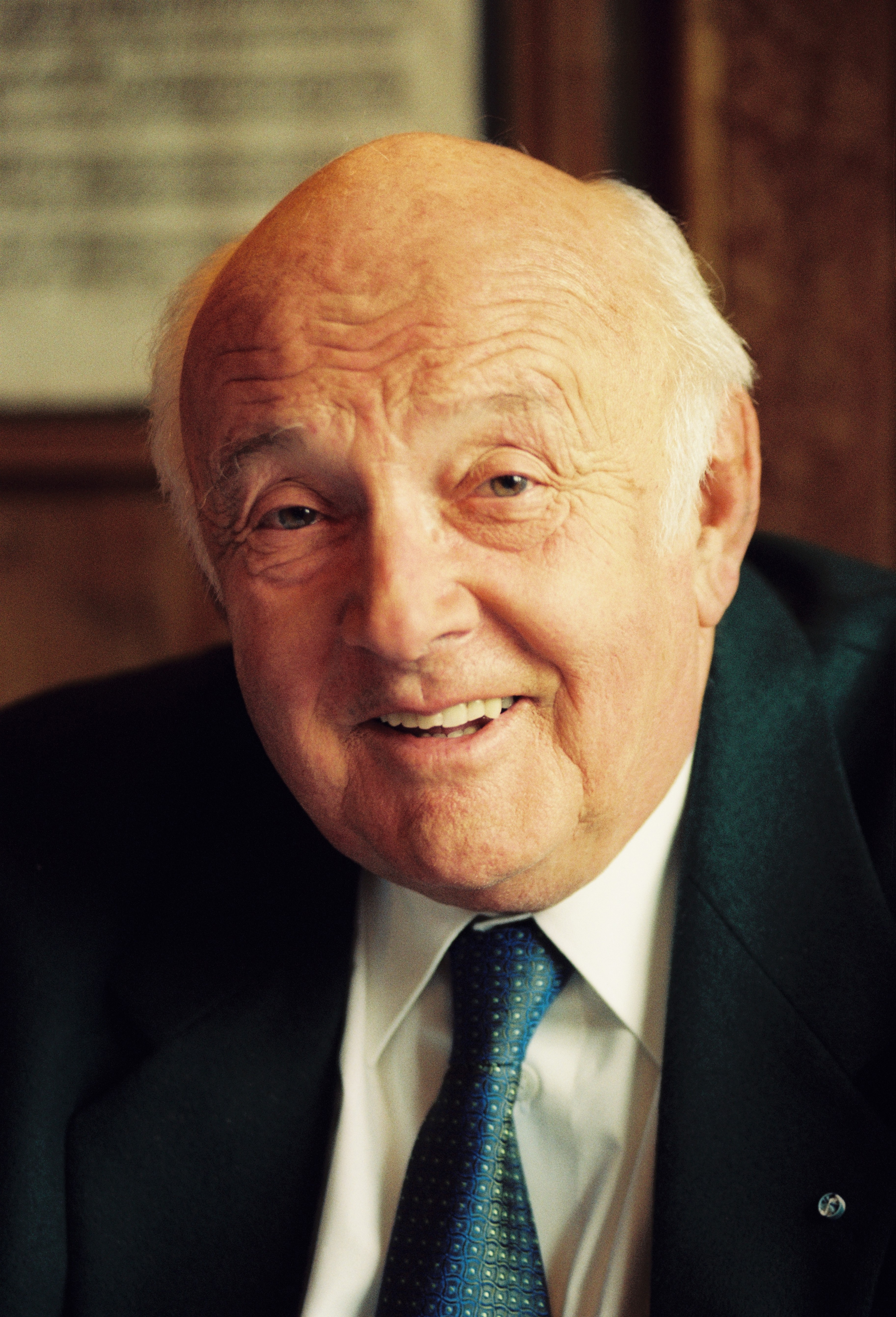
Otfried Preußler (2010)

Otfried Preußler (pronounced [ˈɔtfʁiːt ˈpʁɔʏslɐ]; sometimes spelled Preussler; born Otfried Syrowatka; 20 October 1923 – 18 February 2013) was a German children's book author.

More than fifty million copies of his books have been sold worldwide and they have been translated into fifty-five languages. His best-known works are The Robber Hotzenplotz and The Satanic Mill (Krabat).

== Life and work ==
He was born in Liberec, Czechoslovakia. His mother, Erna Syrowatka (née Tscherwenka), and his father, Josef Syrowatka, were both teachers. They changed their family name from the Czech Syrowatka to the German Preußler in 1941 during the Nazi occupation of Czechoslovakia.

After he graduated school in 1942 – in the midst of World War II – he was drafted into the German Army. Although he survived the military action on the Eastern Front, he was taken prisoner as a 21-year-old lieutenant in 1944. He spent the next five years in various prisoner-of-war (POW) camps in the Tatar Republic.

After his release in June 1949, he found his displaced relatives and his fiancée, Annelies Kind, in the Bavarian town of Rosenheim. They married that same year.

Between 1953 and 1970, he was initially a primary school teacher, then a school principal in Rosenheim. There his talents as a storyteller and illustrator were put to good use, and often the stories he told the children would later be written down and published.

He won the Deutscher Jugendliteraturpreis in 1972 for Krabat.

Preußler resided in Haidholzen, near Rosenheim.

Over 15.2 million copies of his books have been sold in the German language, and his works have been translated into over 55 other languages.

Having essentially retired from writing stories, which had become his main occupation, he undertook the relation of his experiences as a prisoner in the POW camps; those memoirs were to be published after his death.

== Legacy ==
Twenty-two schools are named after him, e.g., a gymnasium (grammar school) is named after him (the "Otfried Preußler Gymnasium Pullach", in Pullach, Bavaria, Germany) and a grundschule (primary school) is named "Otfried Preußler Schule" in Bad Soden.

On 20 October 2017, Google celebrated his 94th birthday with a Google Doodle.

== Selected bibliography in English translation ==
- Der kleine Wassermann (1956). The Little Water Sprite, trans. Anthea Bell (Abelard-Schuman, 1960) ISBN 0-340-28643-1
- Die kleine Hexe (1957). The Little Witch, trans. Anthea Bell (Abelard-Schuman, 1961) ISBN 0-340-16704-1
- Bei uns in Schilda (1958). The Wise Men of Schilda, trans. Anthea Bell (Abelard-Schuman, 1962)
- Thomas Vogelschreck (1958) Thomas Scarecrow, trans. Anthea Bell (Abelard-Schuman, 1973)
- Der Räuber Hotzenplotz (1962). The Robber Hotzenplotz, trans. Anthea Bell (Abelard-Schuman, 1965) ISBN 0-200-71272-1
- Das kleine Gespenst (1966). The Little Ghost, trans. Anthea Bell (Abelard-Schuman, 1967) ISBN 0-340-16703-3
- Die Abenteuer des starken Wanja (1968). The Adventures of Strong Vanya, trans. Anthea Bell (Abelard-Schuman, 1970) ISBN 0-200-71647-6
- Neues vom Räuber Hotzenplotz (1969). The Further Adventures of the Robber Hotzenplotz, trans. Anthea Bell (Abelard-Schuman, 1970)
- Krabat (1971). The Satanic Mill, trans. Anthea Bell (Abelard-Schuman, 1972) ISBN 0-8446-6196-1
- Die dumme Augustine (1972). Silly Augustine (Thienemann, 1989)
- Hotzenplotz 3 (1973). The Final Adventures of the Robber Hotzenplotz, trans. Anthea Bell (Abelard-Schuman, 1974)
- Das Märchen vom Einhorn (1975). The Tale of the Unicorn, trans. Lenny Hort (Dial Books, 1989) ISBN 0-803-70583-2
- Hörbe mit dem großen Hut (1981). Herbie's Magical Hat, trans. Anthea Bell (Hodder & Stoughton, 1986)
- Die Glocke von grünem Erz (1989). The Green Bronze Bell, trans. Caroline Gueritz (Hamish Hamilton, 1977)

== Filmography ==
- The Robber Hotzenplotz (1974)
- Krabat – The Sorcerer's Apprentice (1978)
- Neues vom Räuber Hotzenplotz (1979)
- Malá čarodějnice (1984)
- Das kleine Gespenst (1992)
- Der Räuber Hotzenplotz (2006)
- Krabat (2008)
- Das Kleine Gespenst (English: The Little Ghost) (2013)
- The Little Witch (2018)

== Documentary ==
- Otfried Preußler – Ich bin Krabat. Director: Thomas von Steinaecker, ZDF, Germany, 52 minutes, 2023 (Video on YouTube, arte, available until 31 December 2023, German)

== See also ==
- List of children's literature writers
- List of German writers
- List of novelists

Awards and achievements
Preceded by Wolfgang Schäuble	Konrad Adenauer Prize (with Ernst Nolte); 2000	Succeeded by Peter Maffay
