= Palais Erzherzog Ludwig Viktor =

Coordinates: 48°12′4.4″N 16°22′29.3″E

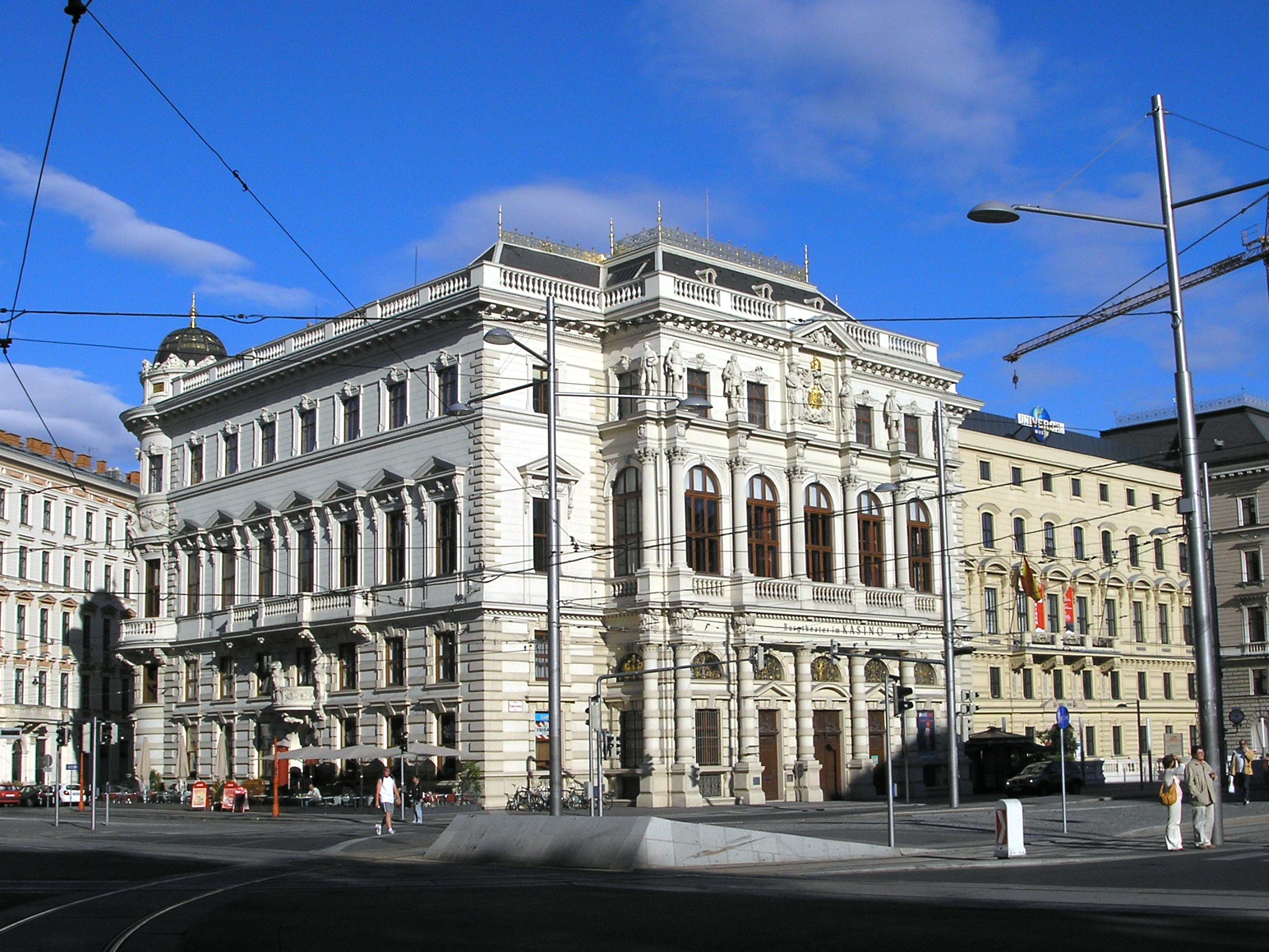
The Palais seen from the Kärntner Ring.

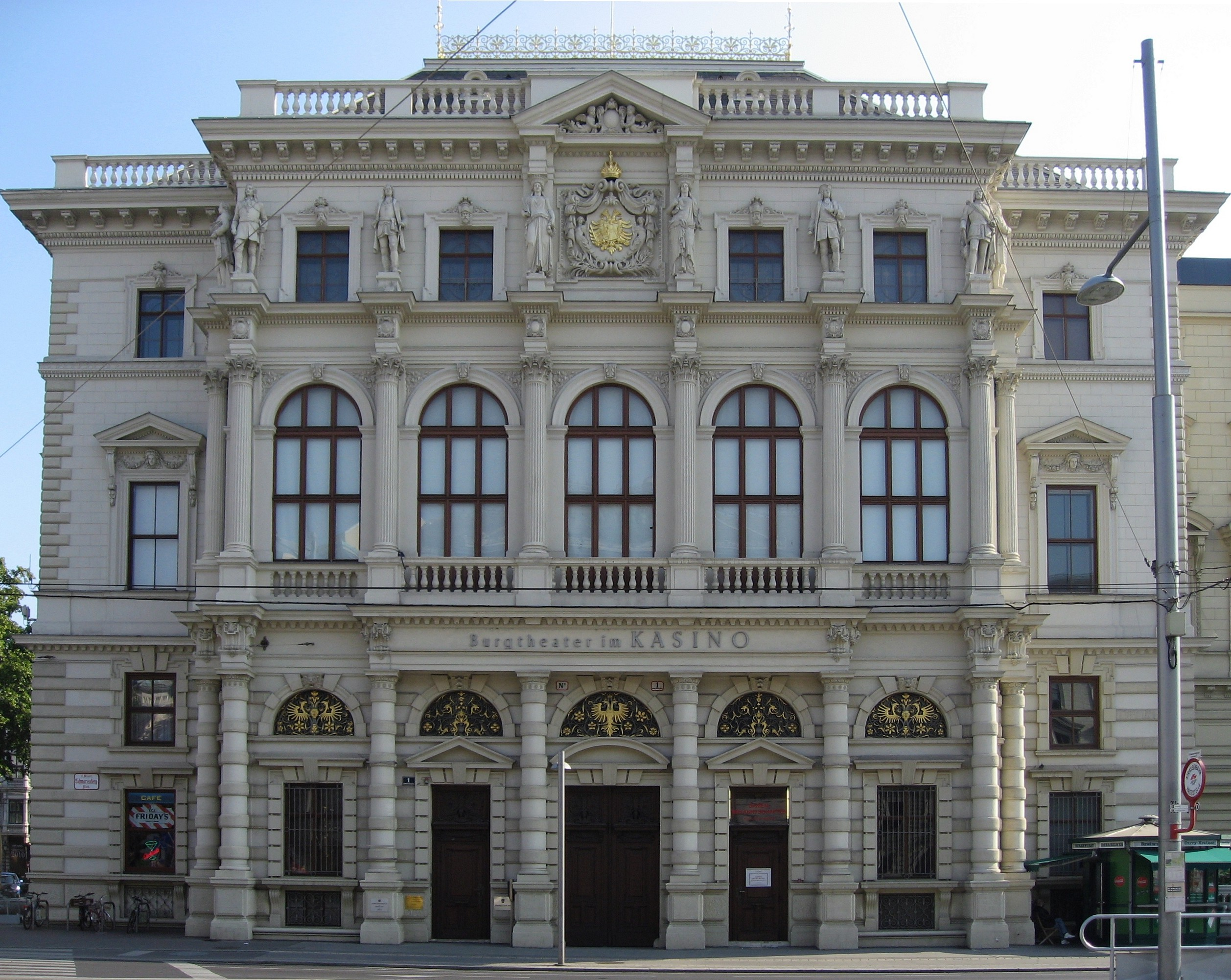
The Palais from the Schwarzenbergplatz.

The Palais Erzherzog Ludwig Viktor is one of the best known Ringstraßenpalais in Vienna. It was built between 1863 and 1866. The first building to be built on the Schwarzenbergplatz, it is now a subsidiary house of the Burgtheater.

== History ==
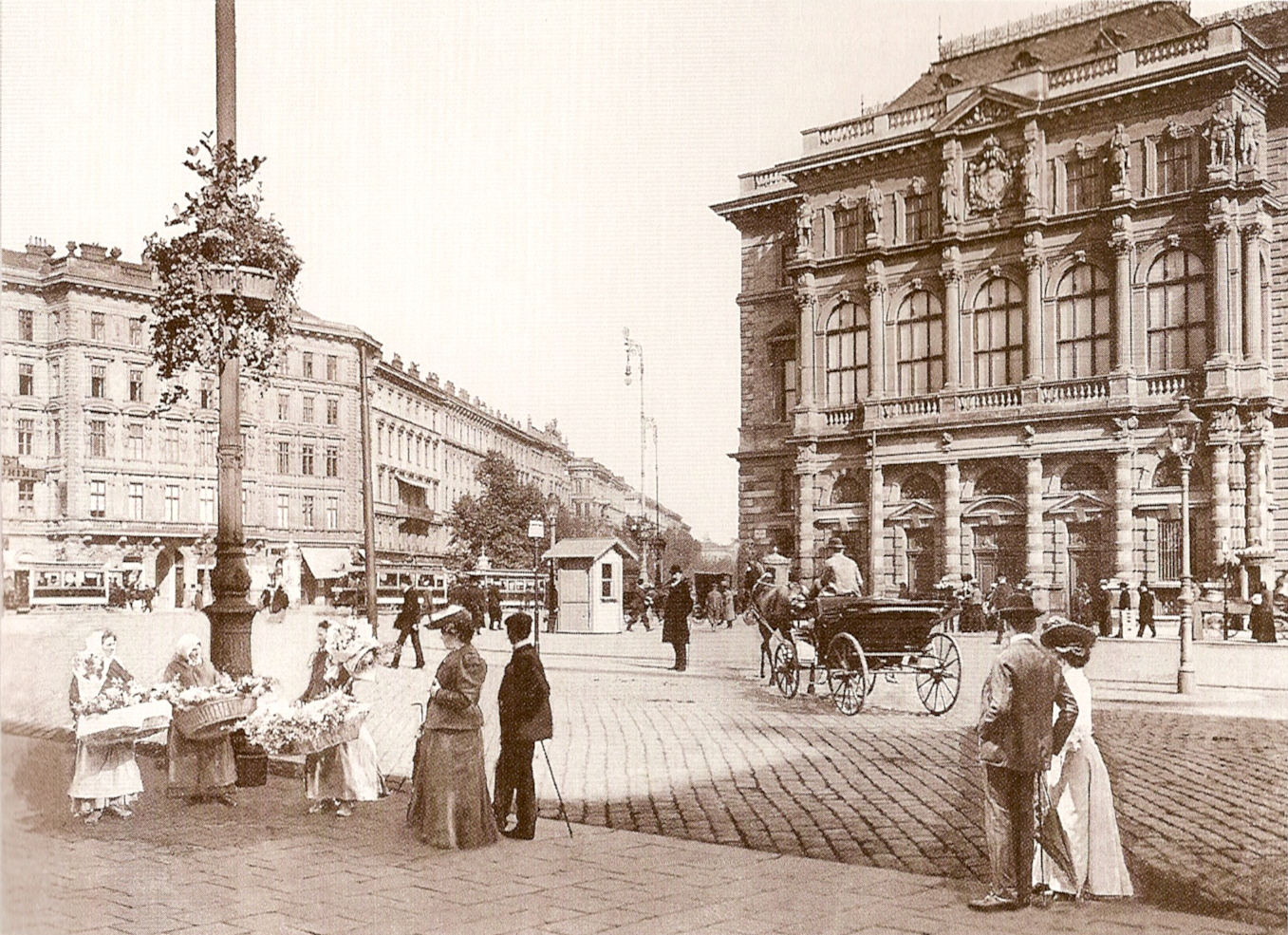
Photomontage around 1900

In 1861 the architect Heinrich Freiherr von Ferstel was commissioned to design a monument to Karl Philipp, Prince of Schwarzenberg on Vienna's Glacis and a square named Schwarzenbergplatz. The Palais was the first building on this new square. It was built for Emperor Franz Joseph I's younger brother Archduke Ludwig Viktor, but it was only completed in 1866 and so he did not use it long before being banished to Schloss Klessheim in Salzburg.

After a major renovation, Franz Joseph I handed the building over to the Militärcasinoverein for "his officers forever".

== Architecture ==
The palace is modeled on the Italian Renaissance.The main facade is oriented towards Schwarzenbergplatz and is dominated by a broad central projection. The structure of the floors corresponds to the intended use at the time of construction. The rooms on the ground floor were intended as stables and coach houses, the living area was on the mezzanine and the ballroom on the first floor. Above that were the servants' apartments.

The front of the projecting central projection is dominated by the mighty arched windows and the balustrade of the ballroom. In the vertical, the risalit is structured by circumferential rows of columns. On the top floor are the 2 ½ meter high statues of Count Niklas Salm, Count Ernst Rüdiger Starhemberg, Ernst Gideon von Laudon, Joseph von Sonnenfels, Johann Bernhard Fischer von Erlach and Prince Eugene of Savoy. They are works by Franz Melnitzky and Josef Gasser.

The coat of arms of Archduke Ludwig Viktor, flanked by caryatids and a triangular gable, completes the central axis.

== Bibliography ==
- Barbara Dmytrasz. Die Ringstraße. Amalthea, Wien 2008. ISBN 978-3-85002-588-1.
- Manfred Matzka: Vieler Herren Häuser. Christian Brandstätter Verlagsges.m.b.H., ISBN 3-85498-444-8
- W. Kraus, P. Müller: Wiener Palais. Blanckenstein Verlag GmbH., ISBN 3-926678-22-4
