= Archduke Franz Karl of Austria =

Austrian archduke (1802–1878)

Archduke Franz Karl
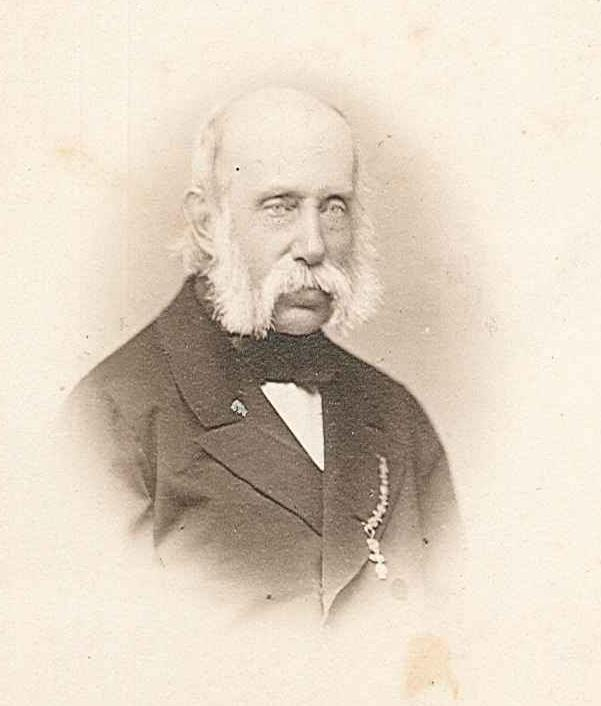
- Franz Karl in his final years
- Born: 17 December 1802; Vienna, Archduchy of Austria
- Died: 8 March 1878 (aged 75); Vienna, Austria-Hungary
- Burial: Imperial Crypt
- Spouse: Princess Sophie of Bavaria (m. 1824; died 1872)
- Issue Detail: Franz Joseph I of Austria; Maximilian I of Mexico; Archduke Karl Ludwig; Archduchess Maria Anna; Archduke Ludwig Viktor
Names
- German: Franz Karl Joseph; English: Francis Charles Joseph
- House: Habsburg-Lorraine
- Father: Francis II, Holy Roman Emperor
- Mother: Princess Maria Theresa of Naples and Sicily

Archduke Franz Karl Joseph of Austria (17 December 1802 – 8 March 1878) was a member of the House of Habsburg-Lorraine. He was the father of two emperors: Franz Joseph I of Austria and Maximilian I of Mexico. Through his third son Karl Ludwig, he was the paternal grandfather of Archduke Franz Ferdinand of Austria, whose assassination sparked the hostilities that led to the outbreak of World War I, and great-grandfather of Emperor Charles I of Austria, the final Habsburg Emperor.

== Life ==
=== Early life and marriage ===
Franz Karl was born in Vienna, the third son of Emperor Francis II of the Holy Roman Empire from his second marriage with Princess Maria Theresa from the House of Bourbon, daughter of King Ferdinand I of the Two Sicilies and Maria Carolina of Austria. On 4 November 1824 in Vienna, he married Princess Sophie of Bavaria from the House of Wittelsbach, a daughter of King Maximilian I Joseph of Bavaria by his second wife Caroline of Baden. Sophie's paternal half-sister, Caroline Augusta of Bavaria was by this time Franz Karl's stepmother, having married his thrice-widowed father in 1816. The Wittelsbachs condoned the unappealing manners of Sophie's husband in consideration of the incapability of his elder brother Ferdinand and Sophie's chance to become Austrian empress.

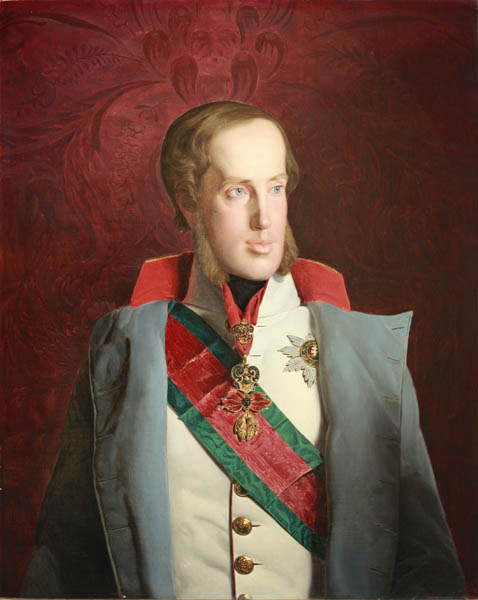
Portrait of Franz Karl in the uniform of an Austrian field marshal by Ferdinand Georg Waldmüller, 1839

Franz Karl was an unambitious and generally ineffectual man, although he was, together with his uncle Archduke Louis, a member of the Geheime Staatskonferenz council, which after the death of Emperor Francis II ruled the Austrian Empire in the stead of his mentally ill brother Ferdinand from 1835 to 1848. The decisions, however, were actually made by the Chancellor Prince Klemens Wenzel von Metternich and his rival Count Franz Anton von Kolowrat-Liebsteinsky. His wife Sophie had already transferred her ambitions, when she urged Franz Karl to renounce his claims to the throne at the time of his brother's abdication on 2 December 1848, allowing their eldest son Franz Joseph I to take the throne.

=== Death and burial ===
Archduke Franz Karl died in Vienna in 1878, six years after the death of his wife. He is buried at the Imperial Crypt at the Capuchin Church. Franz Karl was the last Habsburg whose viscera were entombed at the Ducal Crypt of St. Stephen's Cathedral and whose heart was placed at the Herzgruft of the Augustinian Church according to a centuries-long family rite.

== Honors and awards ==
He received the following awards:

- Austrian Empire:
  - Knight of the Golden Fleece, 1817
  - Grand Cross of St. Stephen, 1835
- Kingdom of France: Knight of the Holy Spirit, 5 February 1824
- Kingdom of Bavaria: Knight of St. Hubert, 1824
- Duchy of Parma: Senator Grand Cross of the Constantinian Order of St. George, with Collar, 1827
- Kingdom of Prussia:
  - Knight of the Black Eagle, 9 September 1835
  - Knight of the Red Eagle, 1st Class
- Baden:
  - Grand Cross of the House Order of Fidelity, 1835
  - Grand Cross of the Zähringer Lion, 1835
- Russian Empire:
  - Knight of St. Andrew, 1835
  - Knight of St. Alexander Nevsky, 1835
  - Knight of the White Eagle, 1835
  - Knight of St. Anna, 1st Class, 1835
- Grand Duchy of Hesse: Grand Cross of the Ludwig Order, 30 August 1837
- Kingdom of Hanover:
  - Grand Cross of the Royal Guelphic Order, 1839
  - Knight of St. George, 1847
- Württemberg: Grand Cross of the Württemberg Crown, 1844
- Sweden-Norway: Knight of the Seraphim, 9 July 1850
- Kingdom of Saxony: Knight of the Rue Crown, 1856
- Oldenburg: Grand Cross of Duke Peter Friedrich Ludwig, with Golden Crown, 13 July 1858
- (Saxe-Coburg and Gotha) (Duchy of Saxe-Altenburg) (Saxe-Meiningen) Ernestine duchies: Grand Cross of the Saxe-Ernestine House Order, February 1859
- Empire of Brazil: Grand Cross of the Southern Cross
- Brunswick: Grand Cross of Henry the Lion
- Kingdom of Greece: Grand Cross of the Redeemer
- Grand Duchy of Tuscany: Grand Cross of St. Joseph
- Two Sicilies: Grand Cross of St. Ferdinand and Merit

== Children ==
Name	Birth	Death	Notes
By Sophie, Princess of Bavaria (27 January 1805 – 28 May 1872; married on 4 November 1824 in St. Augustine's Church, Vienna)
Franz Joseph	18 August 1830	21 November 1916	Succeeded as Emperor of Austria; married his first cousin Elisabeth, Duchess in Bavaria, and had issue
Maximilian	6 July 1832	19 June 1867	Proclaimed Emperor of Mexico executed by a firing squad married Charlotte, Princess of Belgium, no issue
Karl Ludwig	30 July 1833	19 May 1896	Married 1) his first cousin Margaretha, Princess of and Duchess in Saxony, (1840–1858) from 1856 to 1858, no issue, married 2) to Maria Annunziata, Princess of the Two-Sicilies (1843–1871) from 1862 to 1871, had issue (three sons and one daughter) and married 3) to Maria Theresa, Infanta of Portugal, (1855–1944), from 1873 to 1896, had issue (two daughters)
Maria Anna	27 October 1835	5 February 1840	Died in childhood, no issue
Stillborn son	24 October 1840	24 October 1840
Ludwig Viktor	15 May 1842	18 January 1919	Died unmarried, no issue

== See also ==
- List of heirs to the Austrian throne

== Ancestors ==
Ancestors of Archduke Franz Karl of Austria

8. Francis I, Holy Roman Emperor (= 14)
4. Leopold II, Holy Roman Emperor
9. Maria Theresa of Austria (= 15)
2. Francis II, Holy Roman Emperor
10. Charles III of Spain (= 12)
5. Maria Luisa of Spain
11. Maria Amalia of Saxony (= 13)
1. Archduke Franz Karl of Austria
12. Charles III of Spain (= 10)
6. Ferdinand I of the Two Sicilies
13. Maria Amalia of Saxony (= 11)
3. Maria Theresa of Naples and Sicily
14. Francis I, Holy Roman Emperor (= 8)
7. Maria Carolina of Austria
15. Maria Theresa of Austria (= 9)
