= Franz Joseph I =

Habsburg monarch from 1848 to 1916

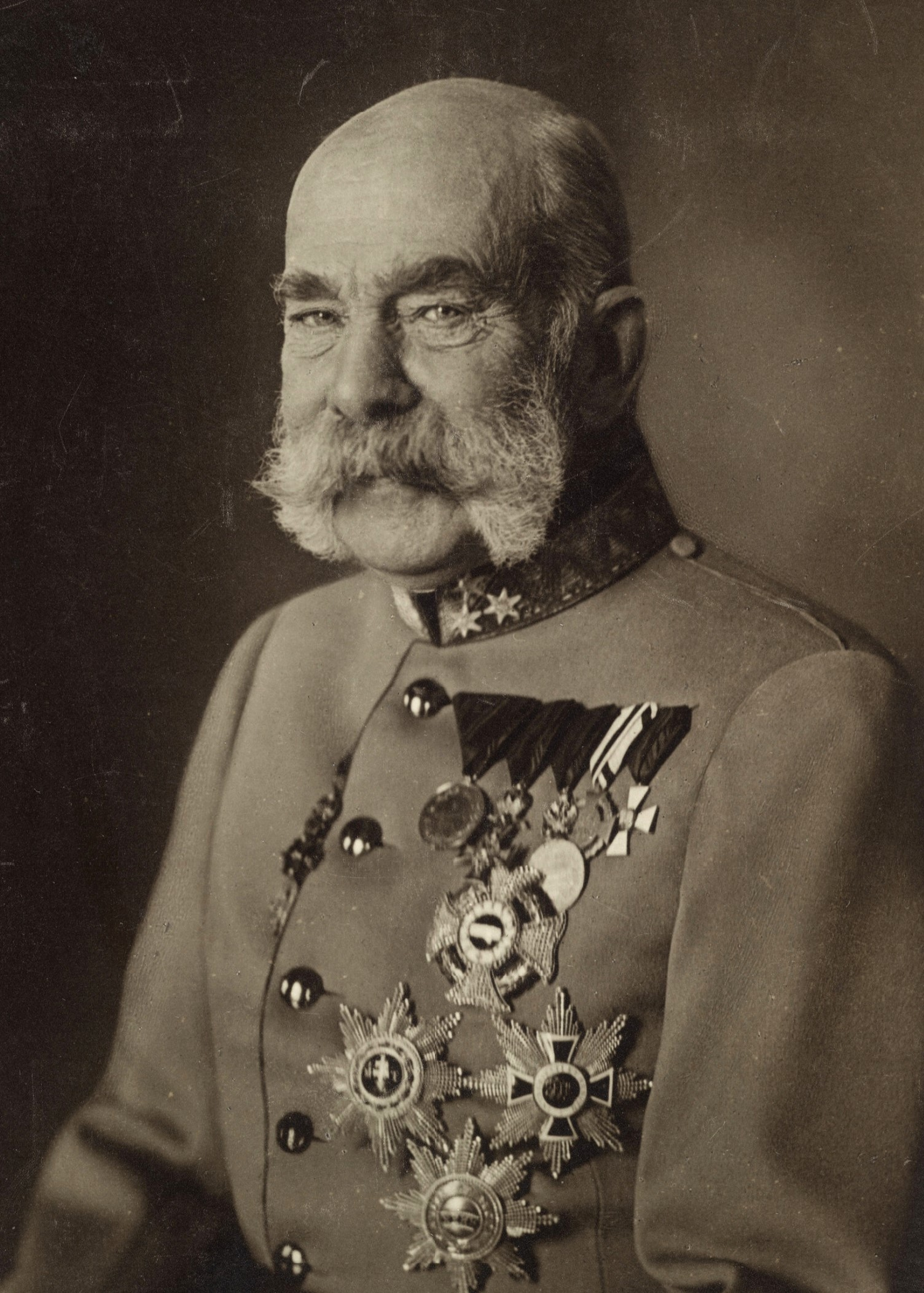
- Formal portrait, 1910

Emperor of Austria King of Hungary
- Reign: 2 December 1848 – 21 November 1916
- Coronation: 8 June 1867, Matthias Church (as King of Hungary)
- Predecessor: Ferdinand I & V
- Successor: Charles I & IV

King of Lombardy-Venetia
- Reign: 2 December 1848 – 12 October 1866
- Predecessor: Ferdinand I & V
- Successor: position abolished

Head of the Präsidialmacht Austria
- In office 1 May 1850 – 24 August 1866
- Preceded by: Ferdinand I & V
- Succeeded by: Wilhelm I (as Head of the North German Confederation)
- Born: 18 August 1830; Schönbrunn Palace, Vienna, Austrian Empire
- Died: 21 November 1916 (aged 86); Schönbrunn Palace, Vienna, Austria-Hungary
- Burial: Imperial Crypt
- Spouse: Duchess Elisabeth of Bavaria (m. 1854; died 1898)
- Issue: Archduchess Sophie; Gisela, Princess of Bavaria; Rudolf, Crown Prince of Austria; Archduchess Marie Valerie
Names
- German: Franz Joseph Karl; English: Francis Joseph Charles
- House: Habsburg-Lorraine
- Father: Archduke Franz Karl of Austria
- Mother: Princess Sophie of Bavaria
- Religion: Catholicism
- Franz Joseph I's voice Voice recording of Franz Joseph I speaking into Valdemar Poulsen's magnetic wire recorder at the Paris World's Fair; Recorded 1900

Franz Joseph I or Francis Joseph I (German: Franz Joseph Karl [fʁants ˈjoːzɛf ˈkaʁl]; Hungarian: Ferenc József Károly [ˈfɛrɛnt͡s ˈjoːʒɛf ˈkaːroj]; 18 August 1830 – 21 November 1916) was Emperor of Austria, King of Hungary, and the ruler of the other states of the Habsburg monarchy from 2 December 1848 until his death in 1916. In the early part of his reign, his realms and territories were referred to as the Austrian Empire, but in 1867 they were reconstituted as the dual monarchy of Austria-Hungary. From 1 May 1850 to 24 August 1866, he was also president of the German Confederation.

In December 1848, Franz Joseph's uncle Emperor Ferdinand I abdicated the throne at Olomouc as part of Minister President Felix zu Schwarzenberg's plan to end the Hungarian Revolution of 1848. Franz Joseph then ascended to the throne at the age of eighteen. In 1854, he married his first cousin Duchess Elisabeth in Bavaria, with whom he had four children: Sophie, Gisela, Rudolf, and Marie Valerie. Largely considered a reactionary, Franz Joseph spent his early reign resisting constitutionalism in his domains. The Austrian Empire was forced to cede its influence over Tuscany and most of its claim to Lombardy–Venetia to the Kingdom of Sardinia, following the Second Italian War of Independence in 1859 and the Third Italian War of Independence in 1866. Although Franz Joseph ceded no territory to the Kingdom of Prussia after the Austrian defeat in the Austro-Prussian War, the Peace of Prague (23 August 1866) settled the German Question in favour of Prussia, which prevented the unification of Germany from occurring under the House of Habsburg.

Franz Joseph was troubled by nationalism throughout his reign. He concluded the Austro-Hungarian Compromise of 1867, which both granted greater autonomy to Hungary and created the dual monarchy of Austria-Hungary. He ruled peacefully for the next 45 years, but suffered multiple personal tragedies: the execution of his brother Emperor Maximilian I of Mexico in 1867, the death by suicide of his son Rudolf in 1889, and the assassinations of first his wife Elisabeth in 1898 and then his nephew and heir presumptive, Archduke Franz Ferdinand, in 1914.

After the Austro-Prussian War, Austria-Hungary turned its attention to the Balkans, then a hotspot of international tension due to Austria's interests conflicting with both the Ottoman and Russian Empires. The Bosnian Crisis resulted from Franz Joseph's 1908 annexation of Bosnia and Herzegovina, already occupied by his troops since the Congress of Berlin (1878). On 28 June 1914, the assassination of Archduke Franz Ferdinand in Sarajevo resulted in Austria-Hungary's declaration of war against the Kingdom of Serbia, an ally of the Russian Empire. This activated a system of alliances declaring war on each other, resulting in World War I. After ruling his domains for almost 68 years, Franz Joseph died in 1916. He was succeeded by his grand-nephew Charles I & IV.

== Early life ==
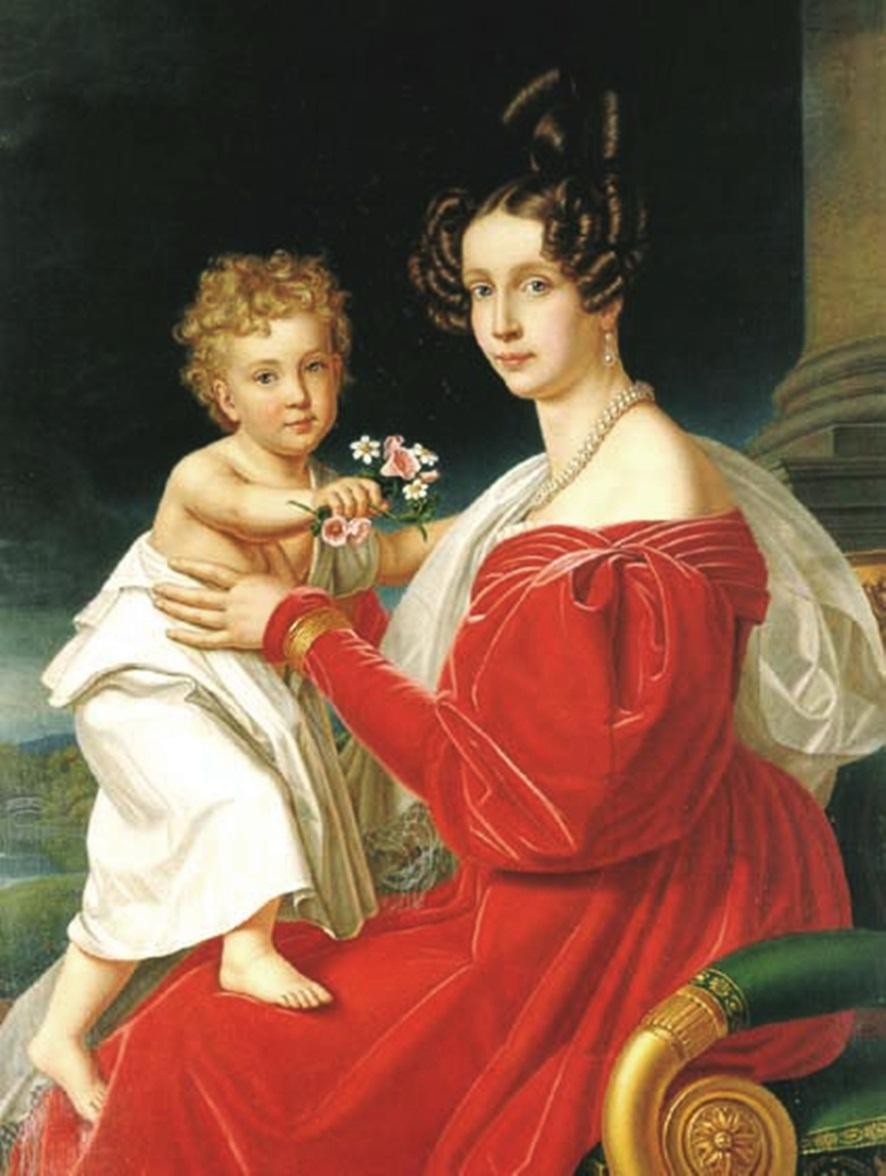
Franz Joseph with his mother Archduchess Sophie, by Joseph Karl Stieler

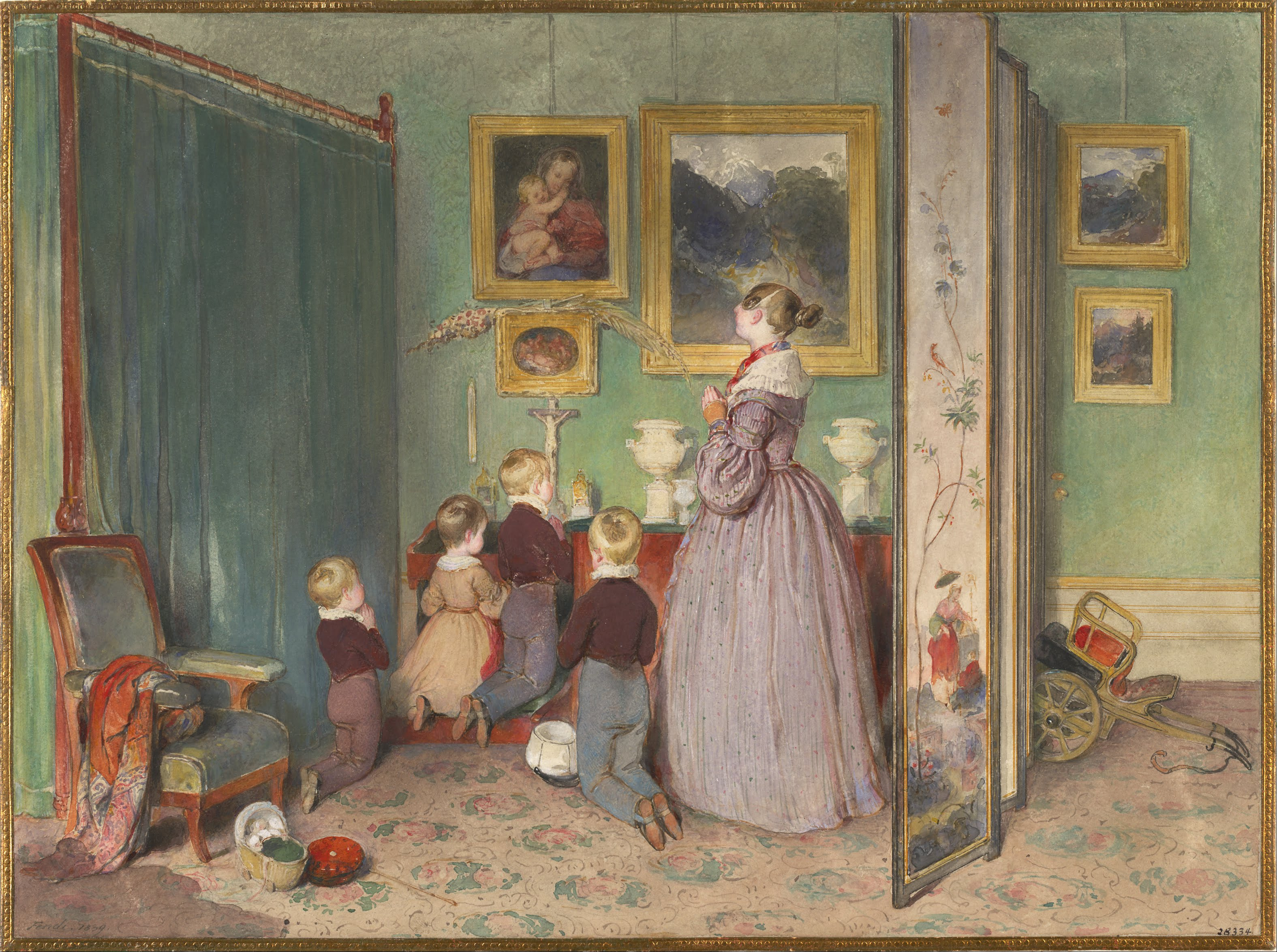
Franz Joseph's family gathered in prayer, 1839

Franz Joseph was born on 18 August 1830 in the Schönbrunn Palace in Vienna (on the 65th anniversary of the death of Francis of Lorraine) as the eldest son of Archduke Franz Karl (the younger son of Francis I), and Sophie, Princess of Bavaria. Because his uncle, reigning from 1835 as the Emperor Ferdinand, was disabled by seizures, and his father unambitious and retiring, the mother of the young Archduke "Franzi" brought him up as a future emperor, with emphasis on devotion, responsibility and diligence.

For this reason, Franz Joseph was consistently built up as a potential successor to the imperial throne by his politically ambitious mother from early childhood.

Up to the age of 7, little "Franzi" was brought up in the care of the nanny ("Aja") Louise von Sturmfeder. Then the "state education" began, the central contents of which were "sense of duty", religiosity and dynastic awareness. The theologian Joseph Othmar von Rauscher conveyed to him the inviolable understanding of rulership of divine origin (divine grace), and therefore a belief that no participation of the population in rulership in the form of parliaments was required.

The educators Heinrich Franz von Bombelles and Colonel Johann Baptist Coronini-Cronberg ordered Archduke Franz to study an enormous amount of time, which initially comprised 18 hours per week and was expanded to 50 hours per week by the age of 16. One of the main focuses of the lessons was language acquisition: in addition to French, the diplomatic language of the time, Latin and Ancient Greek, Hungarian, Czech, Italian and Polish were the most important national languages of the monarchy. In addition, the archduke received general education that was customary at the time (including mathematics, physics, history, geography), which was later supplemented by law and political science. Various forms of physical education completed the extensive program.

On his 13th birthday, Franz Joseph was appointed Colonel-Inhaber of Dragoon Regiment No. 3 and the focus of his training shifted to imparting basic strategic and tactical knowledge. From that point onward, army style dictated his personal fashion—for the rest of his life, he normally wore the uniform of a military officer. Franz Joseph was soon joined by three younger brothers: Archduke Ferdinand Maximilian (born 1832, the future Emperor Maximilian of Mexico); Archduke Karl Ludwig (born 1833, father of Archduke Franz Ferdinand of Austria), and Archduke Ludwig Viktor (born 1842), and a sister, Archduchess Maria Anna (born 1835), who died at the age of 4.

== Revolutions of 1848 ==
During the Revolutions of 1848, the Austrian Chancellor Prince Klemens von Metternich resigned (March–April 1848). The young archduke was widely expected to soon succeed his uncle on the throne. While he was appointed Governor of Bohemia on 6 April 1848, he never took up the post. Sent instead to the front in Italy, he joined Field Marshal Radetzky on campaign on 29 April, receiving his baptism of fire on 5 May at Santa Lucia.

By all accounts, he handled his first military experience calmly and with dignity. Around the same time, the imperial family fled revolutionary Vienna for the calmer setting of Innsbruck, in Tyrol. Called back from Italy, the archduke joined the rest of his family at Innsbruck by mid-June. It was here that Franz Joseph first met his cousin and future bride, Elisabeth, then a girl of 10, but apparently this meeting made little impression.

Following Austria's victory over the Italians at Custoza in late July 1848, the court felt it safe to return to Vienna, and Franz Joseph travelled with them. But within a few weeks, Vienna again appeared unsafe, and in September, the court left once more, this time for Olmütz in Moravia. By now, Alfred I, Prince of Windisch-Grätz, an influential military commander in Bohemia, was determined to see the young archduke soon put on the throne. It was thought that a new ruler would not be bound by the oaths to respect constitutional government to which Ferdinand had been forced to agree, and that it was necessary to find a young, energetic emperor to replace the kindly but mentally unfit Ferdinand.

By the abdication of his uncle Ferdinand and the renunciation of his mild-mannered father, Franz Karl, Franz Joseph succeeded as Emperor of Austria at Olmütz on 2 December 1848. This was the first time at which he became known by his first and second given names together. The name "Franz Joseph" was chosen to bring back memories of the new Emperor's great-granduncle, Emperor Joseph II (Holy Roman Emperor from 1765 to 1790), remembered as a modernising reformer.

Under the guidance of the new prime minister, Prince Felix of Schwarzenberg, the new emperor initially pursued a cautious course, granting a constitution in March 1849. At the same time, a military campaign was deemed necessary against the Hungarians, who had rebelled against Habsburg central authority in the name of their ancient constitution. Franz Joseph also almost immediately faced a renewal of the fighting in Italy, with King Charles Albert of Sardinia taking advantage of setbacks in Hungary to resume the war in March 1849.

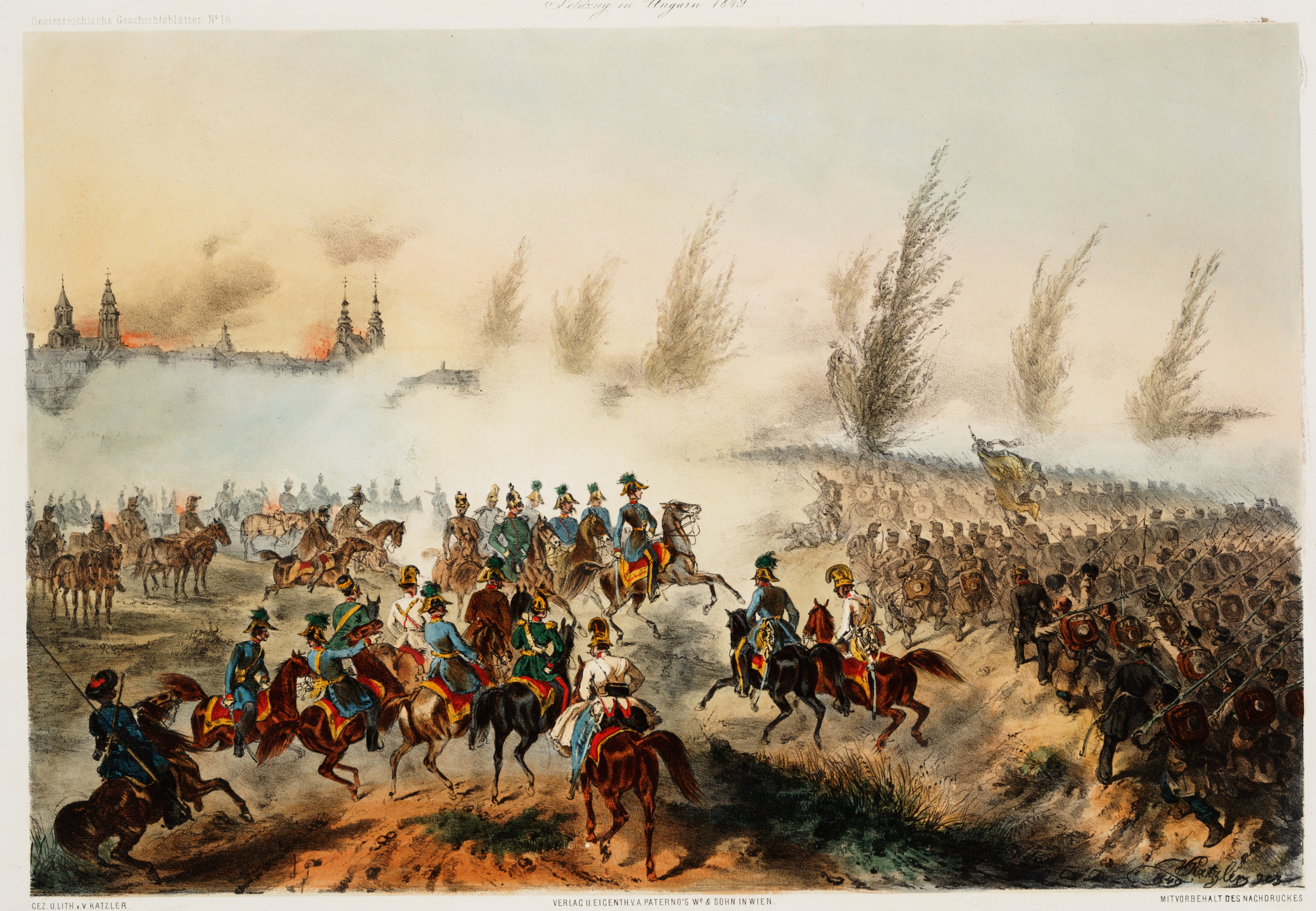
The Battle of Győr on 28 June 1849. Franz Joseph enters Győr leading the Austrian troops.

However, the military tide began to turn swiftly in favor of Franz Joseph and the Austrian whitecoats. Almost immediately, Charles Albert was decisively beaten by Radetzky at Novara and forced to sue for peace, as well as to renounce his throne.

=== Revolution in Hungary ===
Unlike other Habsburg ruled areas, the Kingdom of Hungary had an old historic constitution, which limited the power of the crown and had greatly increased the authority of the parliament since the 13th century. The Hungarian reform laws (April laws) were based on the 12 points that established the fundaments of modern civil and political rights, economic and societal reforms in the Kingdom of Hungary. The crucial turning point of the Hungarian events were the April laws which was ratified by his uncle King Ferdinand, however the new young Austrian monarch Francis Joseph arbitrarily "revoked" the laws without any legal competence. The monarchs had no right to revoke Hungarian parliamentary laws which were already signed. This unconstitutional act irreversibly escalated the conflict between the Hungarian parliament and Francis Joseph. The Austrian Stadion Constitution was accepted by the Imperial Diet of Austria, where Hungary had no representation, and which traditionally had no legislative power in the territory of Kingdom of Hungary; despite this, it also tried to abolish the Diet of Hungary (which existed as the supreme legislative power in Hungary since the late 12th century.)

The new Austrian constitution also went against the historical constitution of Hungary, and even tried to nullify it. Even the territorial integrity of the country was in danger: On 7 March 1849, an imperial proclamation was issued in the name of the Emperor Francis Joseph, according to the new proclamation, the territory of Kingdom of Hungary would be carved up and administered by five military districts, while the Principality of Transylvania would be reestablished. These events represented a clear and obvious existential threat for the Hungarian state. The stadion constitution abolished Hungary’s separate constitutional statehood and reduced the Hungarian state to the status of a typical Habsburg province/crownland within a centralized Austrian Empire. The new constrained Stadion Constitution of Austria, the revocation of the April laws and the Austrian military campaign against the Kingdom of Hungary resulted in the fall of the pacifist Batthyány government (which sought agreement with the court) and led to the sudden emergence of Lajos Kossuth's followers in the Hungarian parliament, who demanded the full independence of Hungary. The Austrian military intervention in the Kingdom of Hungary resulted in strong anti-Habsburg sentiment among Hungarians, thus the events in Hungary grew into a war for total independence from the Habsburg dynasty.

==== Constitutional and legitimacy problems in Hungary ====
On 7 December 1848, the Diet of Hungary formally refused to acknowledge the title of the new king, "as without the knowledge and consent of the diet no one could sit on the Hungarian throne", and called the nation to arms. While in most Western European countries (like France and the United Kingdom) the monarch's reign began immediately upon the death of their predecessor, in Hungary the coronation was indispensable; if it were not properly executed, the kingdom remained "orphaned".

Even during the long personal union between the Kingdom of Hungary and other Habsburg ruled areas, the Habsburg monarchs had to be crowned as King of Hungary in order to promulgate laws there or exercise royal prerogatives in the territory of the Kingdom of Hungary. From a legal point of view, according to the coronation oath, a crowned Hungarian king could not relinquish the Hungarian throne during his life; if the king was alive and unable to do his duty as ruler, a governor (or regent, as they would be called in English) had to assume the royal duties. Constitutionally, Franz Joseph's uncle Ferdinand was still the legal king of Hungary. If there was no possibility to inherit the throne automatically due to the death of the predecessor king (since King Ferdinand was still alive), but the monarch wanted to relinquish his throne and appoint another king before his death, technically only one legal solution remained: the parliament had the power to dethrone the king and elect a new king. Due to the legal and military tensions, the Hungarian parliament did not grant Franz Joseph that favour.

Francis Joseph was, in the strict constitutional sense, a textbook usurper in Hungary: under the Pragmatic Sanction of 1723 (Arts. I–III) and the established Hungarian constitutional law governing succession and coronation, the throne was not vacant while the crowned King Ferdinand V was still alive, and Ferdinand’s unilateral abdication could not by itself make Francis Joseph King of Hungary; without the consent of the Hungarian Diet, the constitutional oath, and coronation with the Holy Crown, Francis Joseph had no lawful authority to exercise the Hungarian royal power—his seizure of that power thus constituting a clear case of usurpation. In short: Francis Joseph was regarded by Hungarians as a usurper and a rebel against the ancient constitution and the established order.

===== Dethronement in Hungary =====
The dethronement was prompted by four principal causes. The first was the Imperial Constitution of Olmütz, proclaimed on 4 March 1849, which threatened to strip Hungary of its ancient constitution and thousand-year-old statehood and reduce it to a mere province within the centralized Austrian Empire; it provoked widespread outrage in Hungary and became a key immediate cause of the dethronement. The second cause was Francis Joseph's usurpation of the Hungarian throne; the third was the repudiation by the Habsburg court of the April Laws, which had been enacted by the Hungarian Diet and sanctioned by King Ferdinand V on 11 April 1848; and fourth, most decisively, the "usurper's" attempt to forcibly overthrow Hungary's legitimate constitutional government and elected representative parliament by the Habsburg army, which was interpreted by the government and Hungarian parliament as an "attempted coup by military force". The Hungarian Diet consequently declared the dethronement of the entire Habsburg-Lorraine dynasty at the Great Calvinist Church in Debrecen on 14 April 1849.

This event gave to the revolt an excuse of legality. Actually, from this time until the collapse of the revolution, Lajos Kossuth (as elected regent-president) became the de facto and de jure head of state of Hungary.

==== Military difficulties in Hungary ====
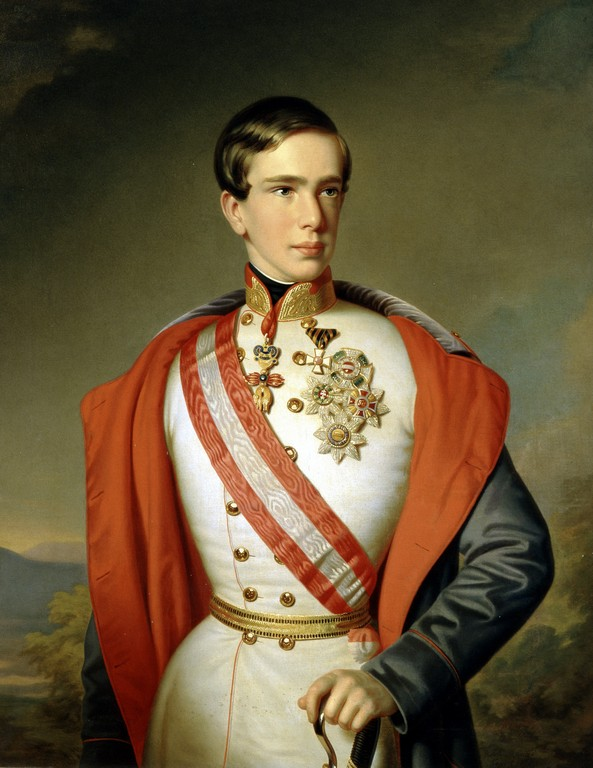
Franz Joseph in 1851.

While the revolutions in the Austrian territories had been suppressed by 1849, in Hungary, the situation was more severe and Austrian defeat seemed imminent. Sensing a need to secure his right to rule, Franz Joseph sought help from Russia, requesting the intervention of Tsar Nicholas I, in order "to prevent the Hungarian insurrection developing into a European calamity". For the Russian military support, Franz Joseph kissed the hand of the tsar in Warsaw on 21 May 1849. Tsar Nicholas supported Franz Joseph in the name of the Holy Alliance, and sent a 200,000 strong army with 80,000 auxiliary forces led by General Ivan Paskevich. Finally, the joint army of Russian and Austrian forces defeated the Hungarian forces. After the restoration of Habsburg power, Hungary was placed under brutal martial law. This led to the death of Lajos Batthyány and executions in Arad.

With order now restored throughout his empire, Franz Joseph felt free to renege on the constitutional concessions he had made, especially as the Austrian parliament meeting at Kremsier had behaved—in the young Emperor's eyes—abominably. The 1849 constitution was suspended, and a policy of absolutist centralism was established, guided by the Minister of the Interior, Alexander Bach.

==== Assassination attempt in 1853 ====
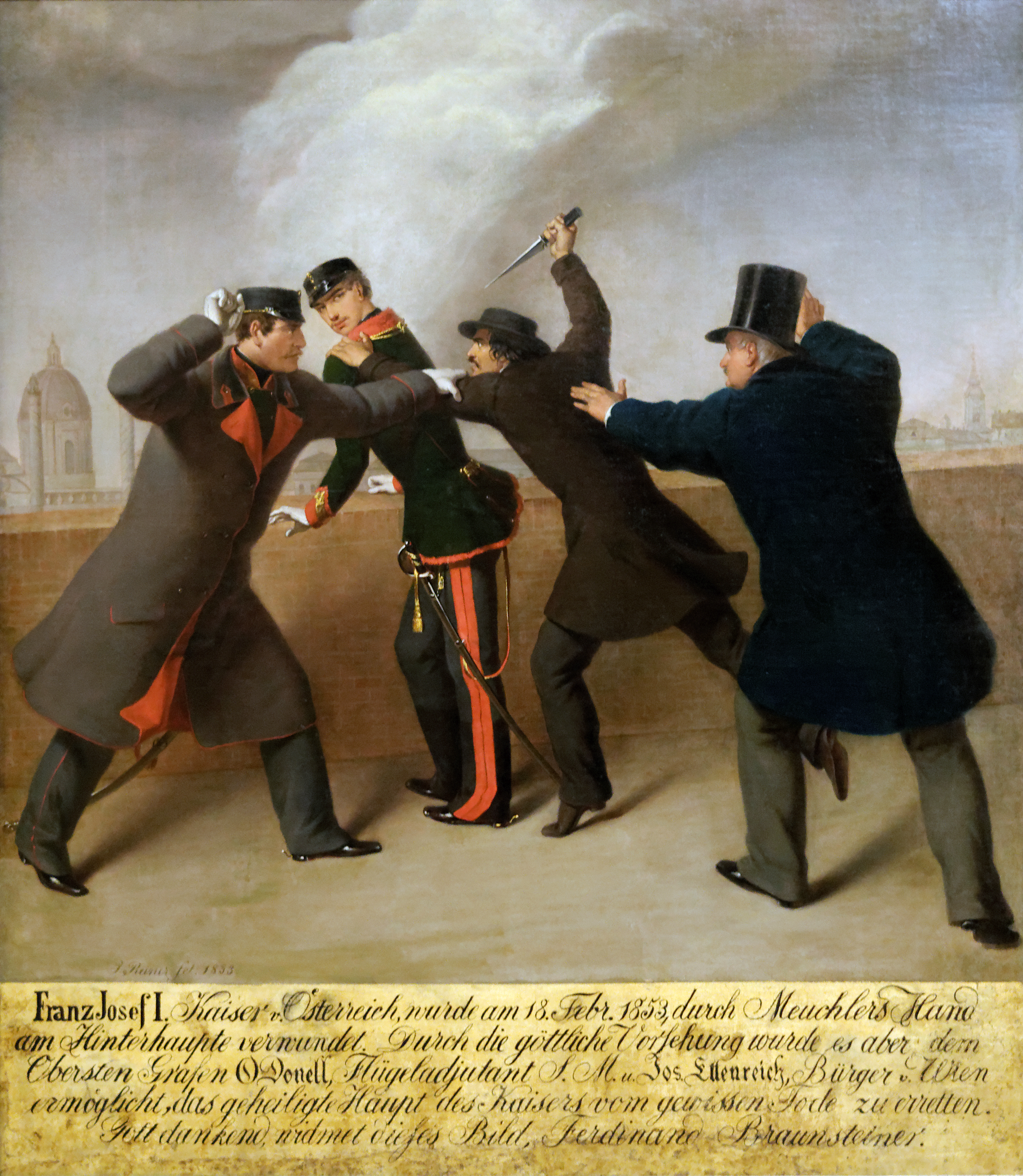
Assassination attempt on the emperor in 1853.

On 18 February 1853, Franz Joseph survived an assassination attempt by Hungarian nationalist János Libényi. The emperor was taking a stroll with one of his officers, Count Maximilian Karl Lamoral O'Donnell, on a city bastion, when Libényi approached him. He immediately struck the emperor from behind with a knife straight at the neck. Franz Joseph almost always wore a uniform, which had a high collar that almost completely enclosed the neck. The collars of uniforms at that time were made from very sturdy material, precisely to counter this kind of attack. Even though the Emperor was wounded and bleeding, the collar saved his life. Count O'Donnell struck Libényi down with his sabre.

O'Donnell, hitherto a Count only by virtue of his Irish nobility, was made a Count of the Habsburg monarchy (Reichsgraf). Another witness who happened to be nearby, the butcher Joseph Ettenreich, swiftly overpowered Libényi. For his deed he was later elevated to the nobility by the emperor and became Joseph von Ettenreich. Libényi was subsequently put on trial and condemned to death for attempted regicide. He was executed on the Simmeringer Heide.

After this unsuccessful attack, the emperor's brother Archduke Ferdinand Maximilian called upon Europe's royal families for donations to construct a new church on the site of the attack. The church was to be a votive offering for the survival of the emperor. It is located on Ringstraße in the district of Alsergrund close to the University of Vienna, and is known as the Votivkirche. The survival of Franz Joseph was also commemorated in Prague by erecting a new statue of St. Francis of Assisi, the patron saint of the emperor, on Charles Bridge. It was donated by Count Franz Anton von Kolowrat-Liebsteinsky, the first minister-president of the Austrian Empire.

== Consolidation of domestic policy ==
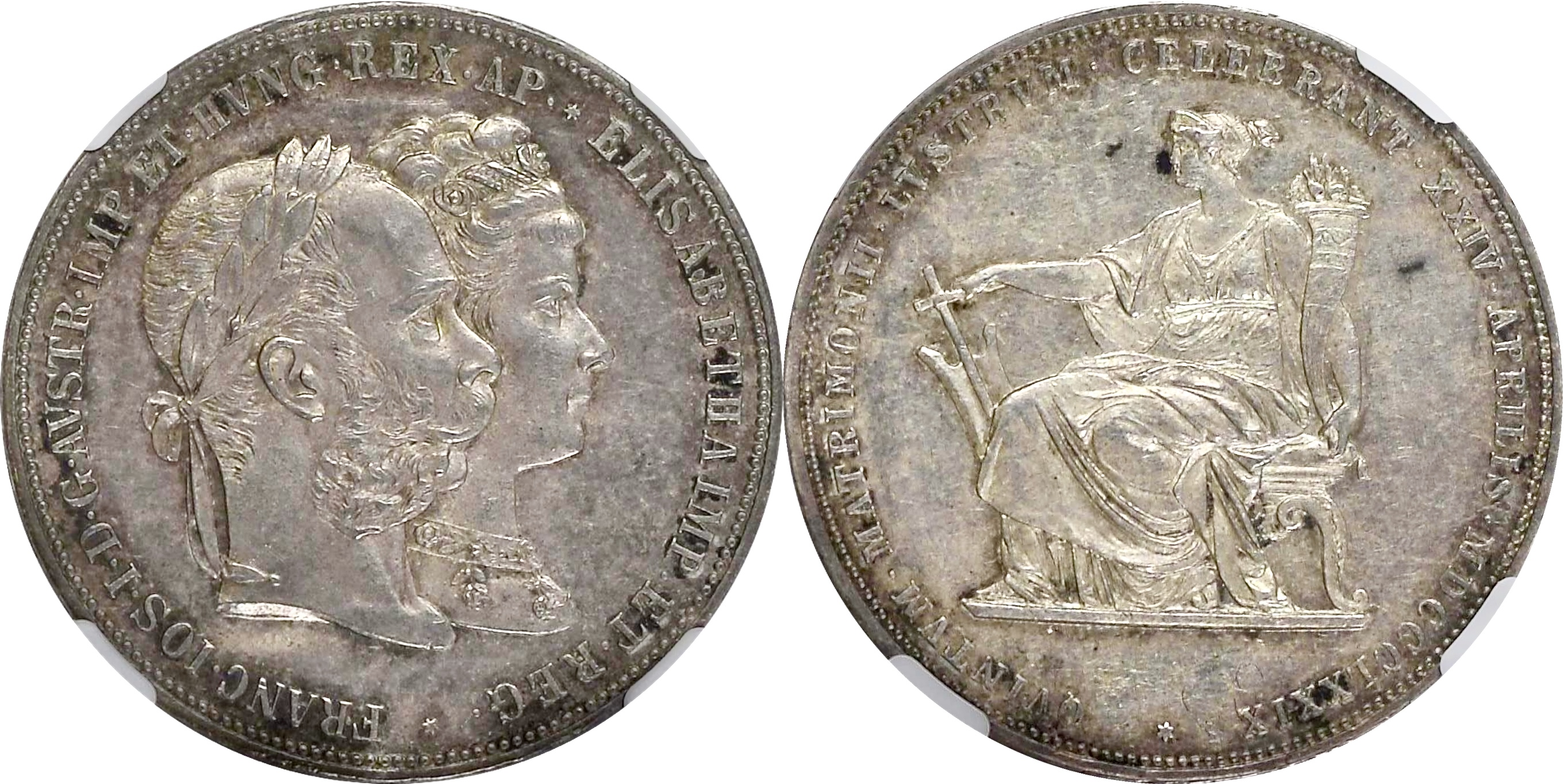
Silver coin: 2 Gulden of Franz Joseph I - Silver Wedding Jubilee

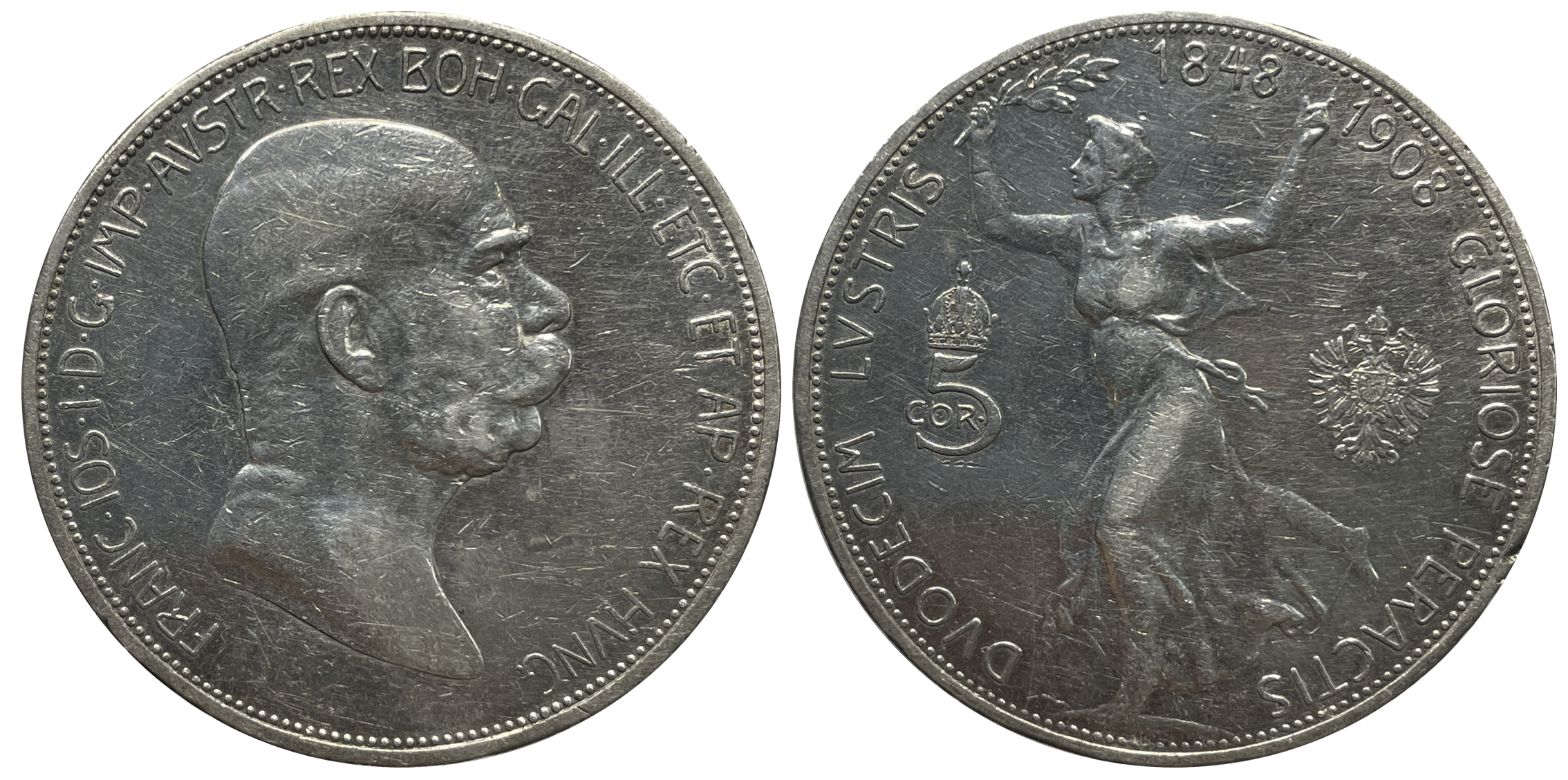
Silver coin: 5 corona, 1908 – The bust of Franz Joseph I facing right surrounded by the legend "Franciscus Iosephus I, Dei gratia, imperator Austriae, rex Bohemiae, Galiciae, Illyriae et cetera et apostolicus rex Hungariae"

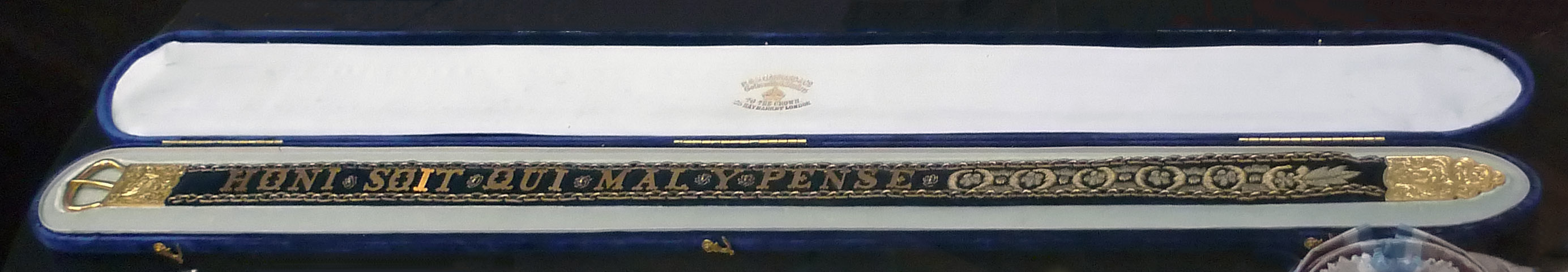
The garter of Emperor Franz Joseph I of Austria

The next few years saw the seeming recovery of Austria's position on the international scene following the near disasters of 1848–1849. Under Schwarzenberg's guidance, Austria was able to stymie Prussian scheming to create a new German Federation under Prussian leadership, excluding Austria. After Schwarzenberg's premature death in 1852, he could not be replaced by statesmen of equal stature, and the emperor himself effectively took over as prime minister. He established absolutist rule by issuing the March Constitution (Austria) in 1849. This was in turn revoked by the Silvesterpatent. Seeking to borrow money on foreign markets, he relented and issued the February Patent in 1861 which established the Empire's constitution.

He was one of the most prominent Roman Catholic rulers in Europe, and a fierce enemy of Freemasonry.

=== Austro-Hungarian Compromise of 1867 ===
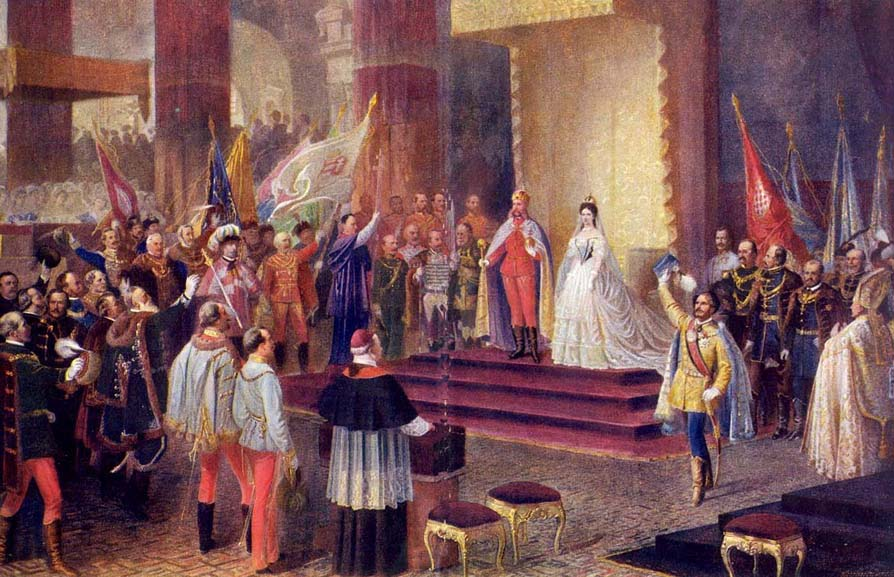
Franz Joseph's coronation as Apostolic King of Hungary. Painting by Edmund Tull.

The 1850s witnessed several failures of Austrian external policy: the Crimean War, the dissolution of its alliance with Russia, and defeat in the Second Italian War of Independence. The setbacks continued in the 1860s with defeat in the Austro-Prussian War of 1866, which resulted in the Austro-Hungarian Compromise of 1867.

The Hungarian political leaders had two main goals during the negotiations. One was to regain the traditional status (both legal and political) of the Hungarian state, which was lost after the Hungarian Revolution of 1848. The other was to restore the series of reform laws of the revolutionary parliament of 1848, which were based on the 12 points that established modern civil and political rights, economic and societal reforms in Hungary.

The Compromise partially re-established the sovereignty of the Kingdom of Hungary, separate from, and no longer subject to the Austrian Empire. Instead, it was regarded as an equal partner with Austria. The compromise put an end to 18 years of absolutist rule and military dictatorship which had been introduced by Francis Joseph after the Hungarian Revolution of 1848. Franz Joseph was crowned King of Hungary on 8 June, and on 28 July he promulgated the laws that officially turned the Habsburg domains into the Dual Monarchy of Austria-Hungary.

According to Emperor Franz Joseph, "There were three of us who made the agreement: Deák, Andrássy and myself." However, the role of Empress Elisabeth (Sisi) cannot be understated in facilitating this compromise. Fluent in Hungarian and deeply sympathetic to the Hungarian cause, Elisabeth fostered close relationships with Hungarian leaders, including Count Gyula Andrássy, and worked behind the scenes to persuade Francis Joseph to adopt a more conciliatory approach. Her influence helped build the trust necessary for successful negotiations, and her personal popularity in Hungary significantly bolstered the monarchy's legitimacy in the region.

Political difficulties in Austria mounted continuously through the late 19th century and into the 20th century. However, Franz Joseph remained immensely respected; the emperor's patriarchal authority held the Empire together while the politicians squabbled among themselves.

=== Bohemian question ===
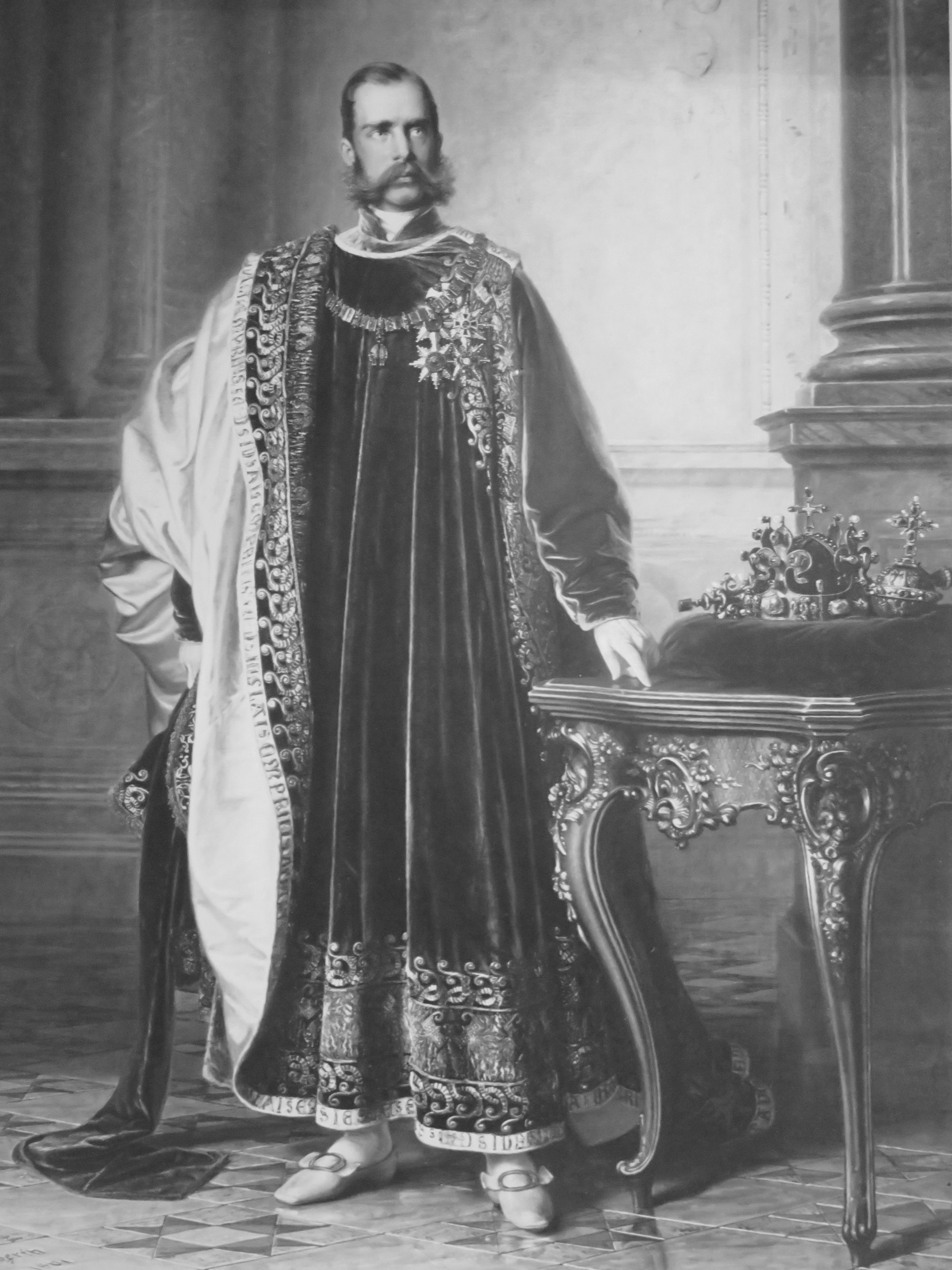
Franz Joseph in the regalia of the Order of the Golden Fleece, with the Bohemian Crown Jewels next to him. Painting by Eduard von Engerth for the Bohemian Diet, 1861.

Following the accession of Franz Joseph to the throne in 1848, the political representatives of the Kingdom of Bohemia hoped and insisted that account should be taken of their historical state rights in the upcoming constitution. They felt the position of Bohemia within the Habsburg monarchy should have been highlighted by a coronation of the new ruler to the king of Bohemia in Prague (the last coronation took place in 1836). However, before the 19th century the Habsburgs had ruled Bohemia by hereditary right and a separate coronation was not deemed necessary.

His new government installed the system of neoabsolutism in Austrian internal affairs to make the Austrian Empire a unitary, centralised and bureaucratically administered state. When Franz Joseph returned to constitutional rule after the debacles in Italy at Magenta and Solferino and summoned the diets of his lands, the question of his coronation as king of Bohemia again returned to the agenda, as it had not since 1848. On 14 April 1861, Emperor Franz Joseph received a delegation from the Bohemian Diet with his words (in Czech):

I will have myself crowned King of Bohemia in Prague, and I am convinced that a new, indissoluble bond of trust and loyalty between My throne and My Bohemian Kingdom will be strengthened by this holy rite.

In contrast to his predecessor Emperor Ferdinand (who spent the rest of his life after his abdication in 1848 in Bohemia and especially in Prague), Franz Joseph was never crowned separately as king of Bohemia. In 1861, the negotiations failed because of unsolved constitutional problems. However, in 1866, a visit of the monarch to Prague following defeat at the Battle of Königgrätz was a huge success, testified by the considerable numbers of new photographs taken.

Portrait by Philip de László, 1899

In 1867, the Austro-Hungarian compromise and the introduction of the dual monarchy left the Czechs and their aristocracy without the recognition of separate Bohemian state rights for which they had hoped. Bohemia remained part of the Austrian Crown Lands. In Bohemia, opposition to dualism took the form of isolated street demonstrations, resolutions from district representations, and even open air mass protest meetings, confined to the biggest cities, such as Prague. The Czech newspaper Národní listy complained that the Czechs had not yet been compensated for their wartime losses and sufferings during the Austro-Prussian War, and had just seen their historic state rights tossed aside and their land subsumed into the "other" half of the Austro-Hungarian Monarchy, commonly called "Cisleithania".

The Czech hopes were revived again in 1870–1871. In an Imperial Rescript of 26 September 1870, Franz Joseph referred again to the prestige and glory of the Bohemian Crown and to his intention to hold a coronation. Under Minister-President Karl Hohenwart in 1871, the government of Cisleithania negotiated a series of fundamental articles spelling out the relationship of the Bohemian Crown to the rest of the Habsburg Monarchy. On 12 September 1871, Franz Joseph announced:

Having in mind the constitutional position of the Bohemian Crown and being conscious of the glory and power which that Crown has given us and our predecessors… we gladly recognise the rights of the kingdom and are prepared to renew that recognition through our coronation oath.

For the planned coronation, the composer Bedřich Smetana had written the opera Libuše, but the ceremony did not take place. The creation of the German Empire, domestic opposition from German-speaking liberals (especially German-Bohemians) and from Hungarians doomed the Fundamental Articles. Hohenwart resigned and nothing changed.

Many Czech people were waiting for political changes in monarchy, including Tomáš Garrigue Masaryk and others. Masaryk served in the Reichsrat (Upper House) from 1891 to 1893 in the Young Czech Party and again from 1907 to 1914 in the Realist Party (which he had founded in 1900), but he did not campaign for the independence of Czechs and Slovaks from Austria-Hungary. In Vienna in 1909 he helped Hinko Hinković's defense in the fabricated trial against prominent Croats and Serbs members of the Serbo-Croatian Coalition (such as Frano Supilo and Svetozar Pribićević), and others, who were sentenced to more than 150 years and a number of death penalties. The Bohemian question would remain unresolved for the entirety of Franz Joseph's reign.

== Foreign policy ==
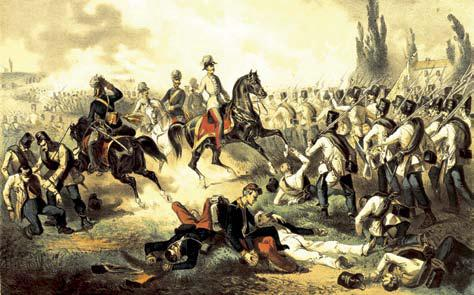
Franz Joseph among his troops at Solferino, fought during the Franco-Austrian War of 1859

=== German question ===
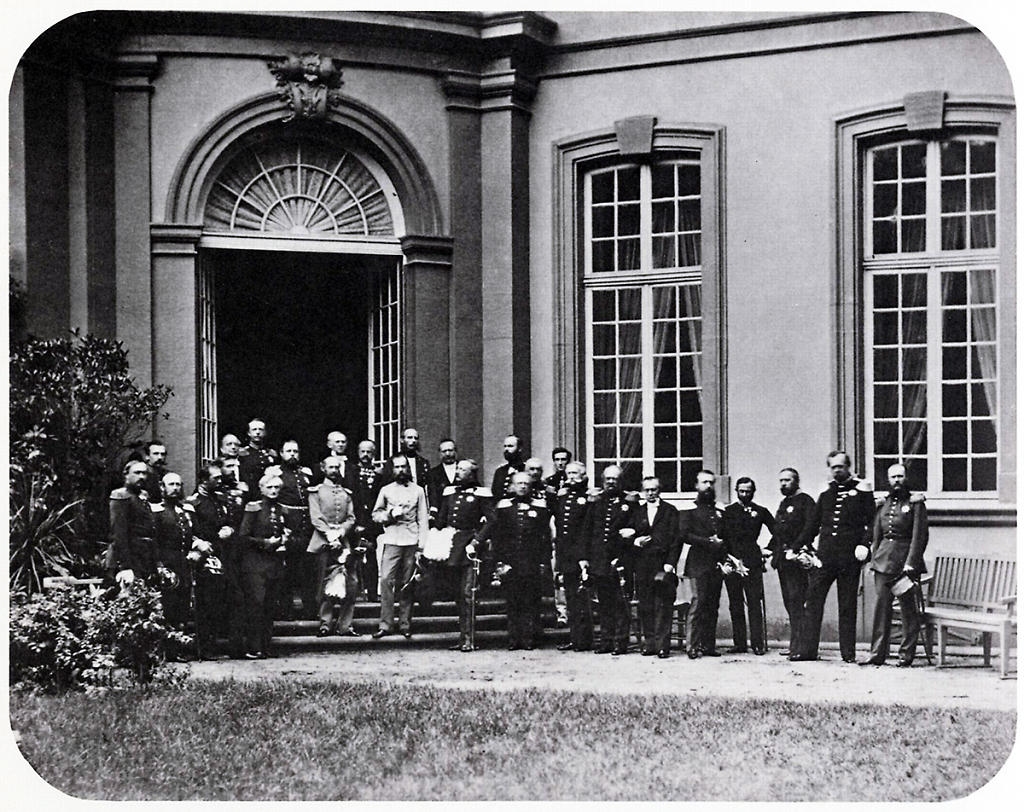
Emperor Franz Joseph (centre in white uniform) at the Congress of German princes in Frankfurt am Main, 1863

The main foreign policy goal of Franz Joseph had been the unification of Germany under the House of Habsburg. This was justified on grounds of precedence; from 1452 to the end of the Holy Roman Empire in 1806, with only one brief period of interruption under the House of Wittelsbach, the Habsburgs had generally held the German crown. However, Franz Joseph's desire to retain the non-German territories of the Habsburg Austrian Empire in the event of German unification proved problematic.

Two factions quickly developed: a party of German intellectuals favouring a Greater Germany (Großdeutschland) under the House of Habsburg; the other favouring a Lesser Germany (Kleindeutschland). The Greater Germans favoured the inclusion of Austria in a new all-German state on the grounds that Austria had always been a part of Germanic empires, that it was the leading power of the German Confederation, and that it would be absurd to exclude eight million Austrian Germans from an all-German nation state. The champions of a lesser Germany argued against the inclusion of Austria on the grounds that it was a multi-nation state, not a German one, and that its inclusion would bring millions of non-Germans into the German nation state.

If Greater Germany were to prevail, the crown would necessarily have to go to Franz Joseph, who had no desire to cede it in the first place to anyone else. On the other hand, if the idea of a smaller Germany won out, the German crown could of course not possibly go to the Emperor of Austria, but would naturally be offered to the head of the largest and most powerful German state outside of Austria—the King of Prussia. The contest between the two ideas, quickly developed into a contest between Austria and Prussia. After Prussia decisively won the Seven Weeks War, this question was solved; Austria lost no territories to Prussia as long as they remained out of German affairs.

=== Three Emperors League ===
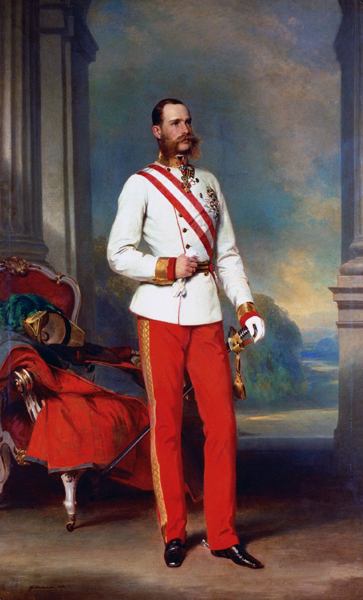
Portrait of Franz Joseph I by Franz Xaver Winterhalter, 1865

In 1873, two years after the unification of Germany, Franz Joseph entered into the League of Three Emperors (Dreikaiserbund) with Emperor Wilhelm I of Germany and Emperor Alexander II of Russia, who was succeeded by Tsar Alexander III in 1881. The league had been designed by the German chancellor Otto von Bismarck, as an attempt to maintain the peace of Europe. It would last intermittently until 1887.

=== Vatican ===
In 1903, Franz Joseph's veto of Jus exclusivae of Cardinal Mariano Rampolla's election to the papacy was transmitted to the Papal conclave by Cardinal Jan Puzyna de Kosielsko. It was the last use of such a veto, as the new Pope Pius X prohibited future uses and provided for excommunication for any attempt.

=== Bosnia and Herzegovina ===
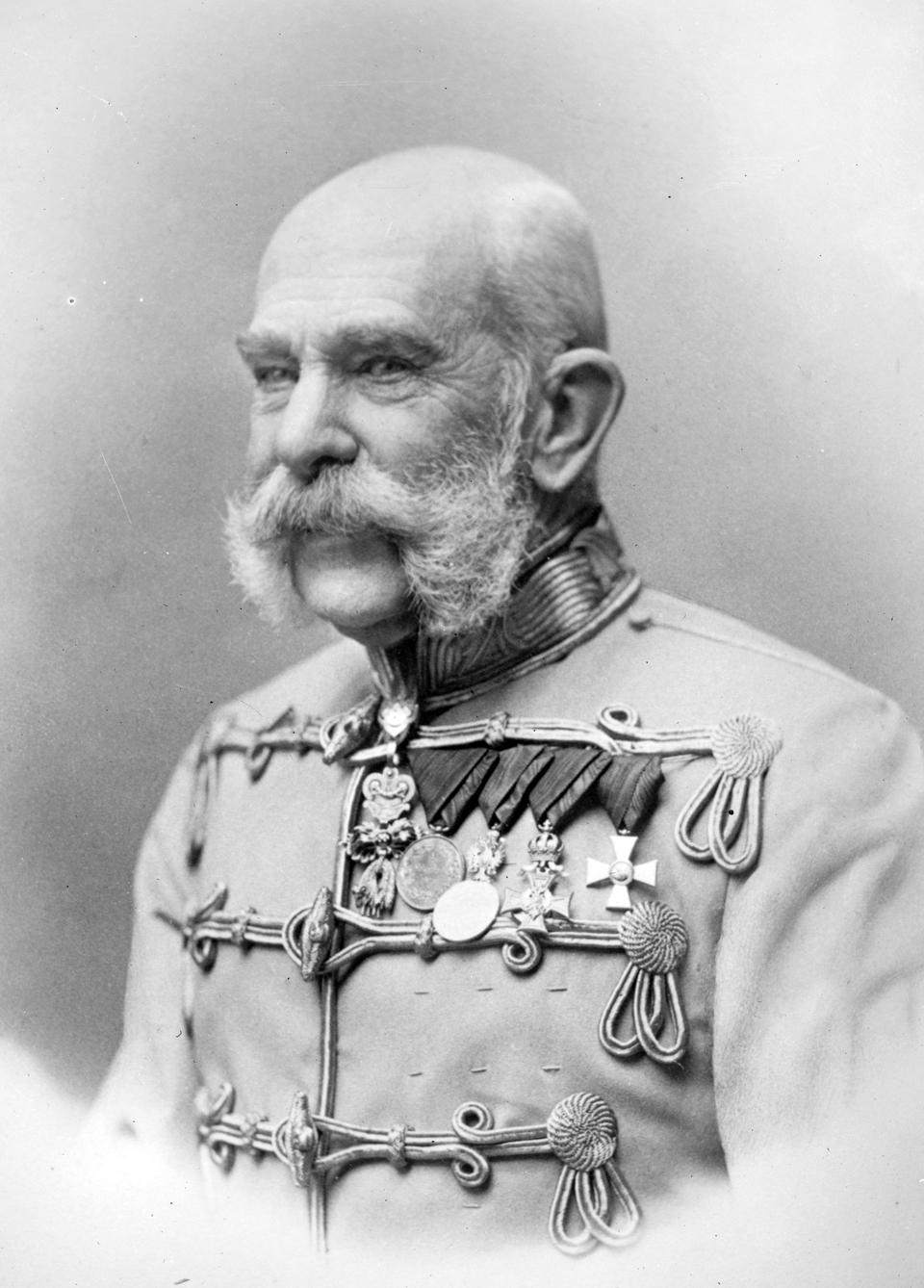
Franz Joseph, c. 1892

During the mid-1870s, a series of violent rebellions against Ottoman rule broke out in the Balkans, and the Turks responded with equally violent and oppressive reprisals. Tsar Alexander II of Russia, wanting to intervene against the Ottomans, sought and obtained an agreement with Austria-Hungary.

In the Budapest Convention of 1877, the two powers agreed that Russia would annex southern Bessarabia, and Austria-Hungary would observe a benevolent neutrality toward Russia in the pending war with the Turks. As compensation for this support, Russia agreed to Austria-Hungary's annexation of Bosnia-Herzegovina. A scant 15 months later, the Russians imposed on the Ottomans the Treaty of San Stefano, which reneged on the Budapest accord and declared that Bosnia-Herzegovina would be jointly occupied by Russian and Austrian troops.

The treaty was overturned by the 1878 Treaty of Berlin, which allowed sole Austrian occupation of Bosnia-Herzegovina but did not specify a final disposition of the provinces. That omission was addressed in the Three Emperors' League agreement of 1881, when both Germany and Russia endorsed Austria-Hungary's right to annex Bosnia-Herzegovina. However, by 1897, under a new tsar, the Russian Imperial government had again withdrawn its support for Austrian annexation of Bosnia-Herzegovina. The Russian foreign minister, Count Mikhail Muravyov, stated that an Austrian annexation of Bosnia-Herzegovina would raise "an extensive question requiring special scrutiny".

In 1908, the Russian foreign minister, Alexander Izvolsky, offered Russian support, for the third time, for the annexation of Bosnia and Herzegovina by Austria-Hungary, in exchange for Austrian support for the opening of the Bosporus Strait and the Dardanelles to Russian warships. Austria's foreign minister, Alois von Aehrenthal, pursued this offer vigorously, resulting in the quid pro quo understanding with Izvolsky, reached on 16 September 1908 at the Buchlau Conference. However, Izvolsky made this agreement with Aehrenthal without the knowledge of Tsar Nicholas II or his government in St. Petersburg, or any of the other foreign powers including Britain, France and Serbia.

Based upon the assurances of the Buchlau Conference and the treaties that preceded it, Franz Joseph signed the proclamation announcing the annexation of Bosnia-Herzegovina into the Empire on 6 October 1908. However a diplomatic crisis erupted, as both the Serbs and the Italians demanded compensation for the annexation, which the Austro-Hungarian government refused to entertain. The incident was not resolved until the revision of the Treaty of Berlin in April 1909, exacerbating tensions between Austria-Hungary and the Serbs.

== Outbreak of World War I ==
Rival military coalitions in 1914: Triple Entente Triple Alliance

On 28 June 1914, Franz Joseph's nephew and heir presumptive Archduke Franz Ferdinand, and his morganatic wife Sophie, Duchess of Hohenberg, were assassinated by Gavrilo Princip, a Yugoslav nationalist of Serbian ethnicity, during a visit to Sarajevo. Franz Joseph learned about the assassination of Franz Ferdinand from his adjutant, cavalry General Eduard von Paar, who also wrote the emperor's reaction in his diary: "one has not to defy the Almighty. In this manner a superior power has restored that order which I unfortunately was unable to maintain."

While the emperor was shaken, and interrupted his holiday to return to Vienna, he soon resumed his vacation at his Kaiservilla at Bad Ischl. Initial decision-making during the "July Crisis" fell to Count Leopold Berchtold, the Imperial foreign minister; Count Franz Conrad von Hötzendorf, the chief of the Austro-Hungarian General Staff and the other ministers. The ultimate resolution of deliberations by the Austro-Hungarian government during the weeks following the assassination of the Archduke was to give Serbia an ultimatum of itemized demands that would reveal the conspirators in assassination of the archduke. However Serbia, despite no involvement in the plot, attempted to cover up the conspirators by either saying one of the conspirators never existed or being vague with the details. For Austria-Hungary, it was a matter of security as the Black hand had been terrorising Bosnia for years and had even attempted to assassinate the governor of Bosnia in 1910. The empire had no choice but war to save its prestige, even though Franz Joseph was hesitant and now with Archduke Franz Ferdinand no longer vetoing the Austrian general staff's demands against war, Hotzendorf, always the advocate for war against Serbia to destroy black hand as the organisation was based in Serbia, got his way.

A week after delivery of the Austro-Hungarian ultimatum to Serbia; on 28 July, war was declared. Within weeks, the Germans, Russians, French and British had all entered the fray which eventually became known as World War I. On 6 August, Franz Joseph signed the declaration of war against Russia.

== Death ==
Film of the funeral procession of Franz Joseph

Franz Joseph died in the Schönbrunn Palace on the evening of 21 November 1916, at the age of 86. His final words to his valet were: "Tomorrow morning, at half past three." Although sick, he was determined to rise at his usual time.

His death was a result of developing pneumonia of the right lung several days after catching a cold while walking in Schönbrunn Park with King Ludwig III of Bavaria. He was succeeded by his grandnephew Charles I & IV, who reigned until the collapse of the empire following its defeat at the end of the First World War in 1918. He is buried in the Imperial Crypt in Vienna.

== Family ==
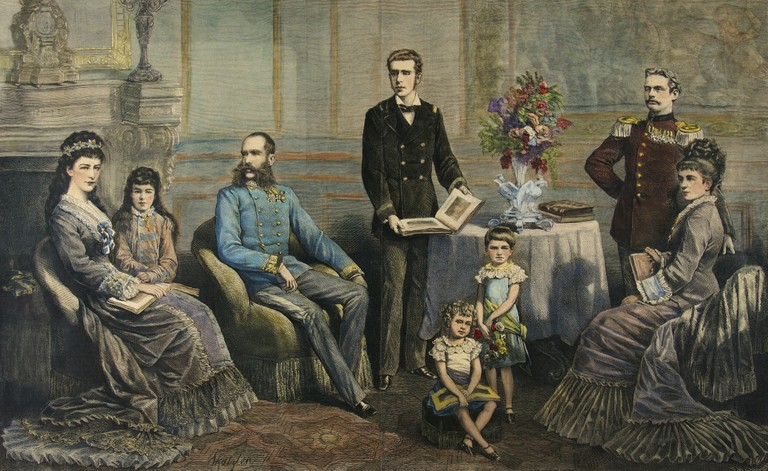
Painting of Franz Joseph with his family

It was generally felt in the court that the emperor should marry and produce heirs as soon as possible. Various potential brides were considered, including Archduchess Elisabeth Franziska of Austria, Princess Anna of Prussia and Princess Sidonia of Saxony. Although in public life Franz Joseph was the unquestioned director of affairs, in his private life his mother still wielded crucial influence. Sophie wanted to strengthen the relationship between the Houses of Habsburg and Wittelsbach—descending from the latter house herself—and hoped to match Franz Joseph with her sister Ludovika's eldest daughter, Helene ("Néné"), who was four years the emperor's junior.

However, Franz Joseph fell deeply in love with Néné's younger sister Elisabeth ("Sisi"), a beautiful girl of 15, and insisted on marrying her instead. Sophie acquiesced, despite her misgivings about Sisi's appropriateness as an imperial consort, and the young couple were married on 24 April 1854 in St. Augustine's Church, Vienna.

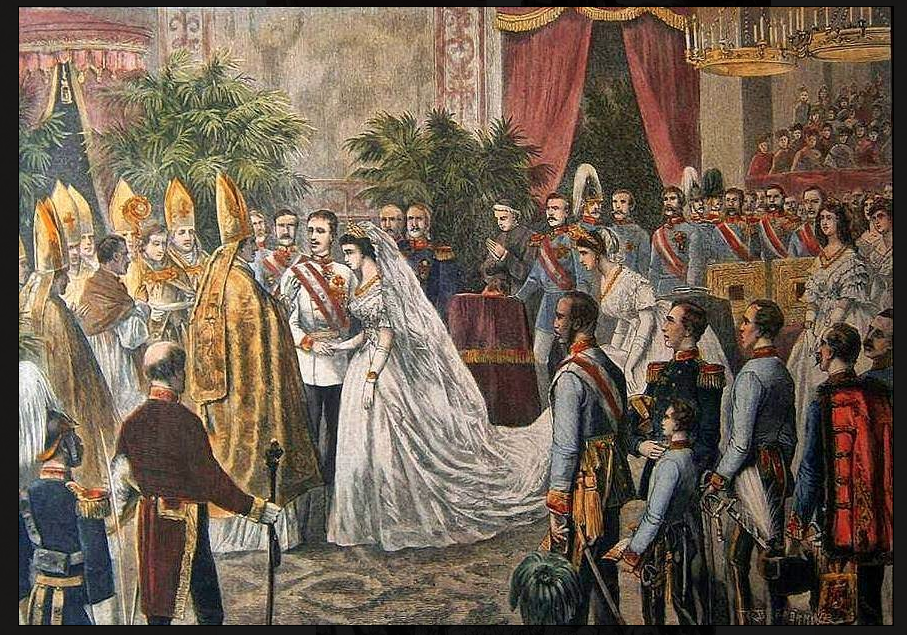
Marriage of Franz Joseph and Elisabeth.

Their marriage would eventually prove to be an unhappy one; though Franz Joseph was passionately in love with his wife, the feeling was not mutual. Elisabeth never truly acclimatized to life at court, and was frequently in conflict with the imperial family. Their first daughter Sophie died as an infant, and their only son Rudolf died by suicide in 1889 in the infamous Mayerling Incident.

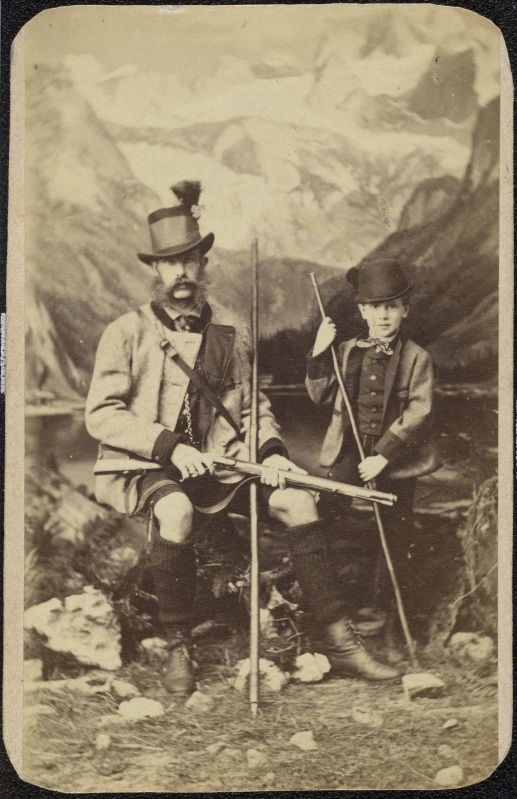
Emperor Franz Joseph hunting with his only son Rudolf, Crown Prince of Austria.

In 1875, Franz Joseph became the principal heir to the substantial fortune left by his predecessor and uncle, Ferdinand I, which consisted mainly of the Bohemian estates of the Duke of Reichstadt.

In 1885, Franz Joseph met Katharina Schratt, a leading actress of the Vienna stage, and she became his friend and confidante. This relationship lasted the rest of his life, and was—to a certain degree—tolerated by Elisabeth. Franz Joseph built Villa Schratt in Bad Ischl for her, and also provided her with a small palace in Vienna. Though their relationship lasted for 34 years, it remained platonic.

The empress was an inveterate traveller, horsewoman, and fashion maven who was rarely seen in Vienna. Sisi was obsessed about preserving her beauty, carrying out many bizarre routines and strenuous exercise, and as a result suffered from ill health. She was stabbed to death by an Italian anarchist in 1898 while on a visit to Geneva. A few days after the funeral, Robert of Parma wrote in a letter to his friend Tirso de Olazábal that "It was pitiful to look at the Emperor, he showed a great deal of energy in his immense pain, but at times one could see all the immensity of his grief." Franz Joseph never fully recovered from the loss. According to the future empress Zita of Bourbon-Parma he told his relatives: "You'll never know how important she was to me" or, according to some sources, "You will never know how much I loved this woman."

=== Relationship with Franz Ferdinand ===
Archduke Franz Ferdinand became heir presumptive (Thronfolger) to the throne of Austria-Hungary in 1896 after the deaths of his cousin Rudolf (in 1889) and his father Karl Ludwig (in 1896). The relationship between him and Franz Joseph had always been a fairly contentious one, which was further exacerbated when Franz Ferdinand announced his desire to marry Countess Sophie Chotek. The emperor would not even consider giving his blessing to the union, as Sophie was merely of noble rank, not dynastic rank.

Although the emperor received letters from members of the imperial family throughout the fall and winter of 1899 beseeching him to relent, Franz Joseph stood his ground. He finally gave his consent in 1900. However, the marriage was to be morganatic, and any children of the marriage would be ineligible to succeed to the throne. The couple were married on 1 July 1900 at Reichstadt. The emperor did not attend the wedding, nor did any of the archdukes. After that, the two men disliked and mistrusted each other.

His interactions with Franz Ferdinand were strained; the emperor's personal attendant recollected in his memoirs that "thunder and lightning always raged when they had their discussions".

Following the assassination of Franz Ferdinand and Sophie in 1914, Franz Joseph's daughter, Marie Valerie, noted that her father expressed his greater confidence in the new heir presumptive, his grandnephew Archduke Charles. The emperor admitted to his daughter, regarding the assassination, "For me, it is a relief from a great worry."

== Titles, styles, honours and arms ==
Styles of Franz Joseph I of Austria and Hungary
- Reference style: His Imperial and Royal Apostolic Majesty
- Spoken style: Your Imperial and Royal Apostolic Majesty

Monarchical styles of Franz Joseph I of Austria
- Reference style: His Imperial and Royal Majesty
- Spoken style: Your Imperial and Royal Majesty

Monarchical styles of Ferenc József I of Hungary
- Reference style: His Apostolic Majesty
- Spoken style: Your Apostolic Majesty

=== Name ===
Franz Joseph's names in the languages of his empire included:

- Bosnian: Franjo Josip I
- Croatian: Franjo Josip I.
- Czech: František Josef I
- German: Franz Joseph I
- Hungarian: I. Ferenc József
- Italian: Francesco Giuseppe I
- Polish: Franciszek Józef I
- Romanian: Francisc Iosif
- Serbian: Фрања Јосиф, Franja Josif
- Slovak: František Jozef I
- Slovene: Franc Jožef I
- Ukrainian: Фра́нц Йо́сиф I (Fránts Jósif I)

=== Titles and styles ===
- 18 August 1830 – 2 December 1848: His Imperial and Royal Highness Archduke and Prince Francis Joseph of Austria, Prince of Hungary, Bohemia and Croatia
- 2 December 1848 – 21 November 1916: His Imperial and Royal Apostolic Majesty The Emperor of Austria, Apostolic King of Hungary

The full titulature of Francis Joseph after he succeeded his uncle Ferdinand I to the thrones of Empire of Austria and the vast realms of Central and Eastern Europe went as follows:

His Imperial and Royal Apostolic Majesty, Francis Joseph I, by the Grace of God Emperor of Austria, King of Hungary, Bohemia, Lombardy–Venetia, Dalmatia, Croatia, Slavonia, Galicia, Lodomeria and Illyria; King of Jerusalem, etc. etc.; Archduke of Austria; Grand Duke of Tuscany and Cracow; Duke of Lorraine, Salzburg, Styria, Carinthia, Carniola and Bukovina; Grand Prince of Transylvania; Margrave of Moravia; Duke of Upper and Lower Silesia, of Modena, Parma, Piacenza and Guastalla, of Auschwitz and Zator, of Teschen, Friaul, Ragusa and Zara; Princely Count of Habsburg and Tyrol, of Kyburg, Gorizia and Gradisca; Prince of Trento and Brixen; Margrave of Upper and Lower Lusatia, Istria; Count of Hohenems, Feldkirch, Bregenz, Sonnenberg, etc. etc.; Lord of Trieste, of Cattaro and on the Windic March; Grand Voivode of the Voivodeship of Serbia, etc. etc.

=== Honours ===
==== National decorations ====
- Knight of the Golden Fleece, 1844; Chief and Sovereign, 2 December 1848 (Orden vom Goldenen Vlies, ex officio as Emperor of Austria)
- Grand Master of the Military Order of Maria Theresa (Militär Maria-Theresien-Orden, ex officio as Emperor of Austria)
- Grand Master of the Royal Hungarian Order of St. Stephen (Königlich ungarischer St. Stephan-Orden, ex officio as Emperor of Austria)
- Grand Master of the Austrian Imperial Order of Leopold (Leopold-Orden, ex officio as Emperor of Austria)
- Grand Master of the Imperial Order of the Iron Crown (Orden der Eisernen Krone, ex officio as Emperor of Austria)

In addition, he founded the Order of Franz Joseph (Franz Joseph-Orden) on 2 December 1849, and the Order of Elizabeth (Elizabeth-Orden) in 1898.

==== Foreign decorations ====
- Ascanian duchies: Grand Cross of the Order of Albert the Bear, 27 October 1849
- Baden:
  - Knight of the House Order of Fidelity, 1851
  - Grand Cross of the Zähringer Lion, 1851
- Bavaria:
  - Knight of St. Hubert, 1849
  - Grand Cross of the Military Order of Max Joseph
- Belgium: Grand Cordon of the Order of Leopold (civil), 19 April 1849
- Brunswick: Grand Cross of the Order of Henry the Lion, 1854
- Bulgaria:
  - Knight of Saints Cyril and Methodius
  - Order of Bravery, Grade I
- Denmark: Knight of the Elephant, 17 January 1849
- Ernestine duchies: Grand Cross of the Saxe-Ernestine House Order, March 1852
- France: Grand Cross of the Legion of Honour
- Hanover:
  - Knight of St. George, 1848
  - Grand Cross of the Royal Guelphic Order
- Hawaii:
  - Grand Cross of the Order of Kamehameha I, 1865
  - Grand Cross of the Order of Kalākaua, 1878
- Hesse-Darmstadt: Grand Cross of the Ludwig Order, 3 May 1851
- Hesse-Kassel: Knight of the Golden Lion, 19 November 1851
- Holy See: Grand Cross of the Holy Sepulchre of Jerusalem
- Italy:
  - Knight of the Annunciation, 13 April 1869
  - Grand Cross of Saints Maurice and Lazarus, 1869
  - Grand Cross of the Crown of Italy, 1869
- Japan: Grand Cordon of the Order of the Chrysanthemum, 7 May 1880; Collar, 25 October 1898
- Sovereign Military Order of Malta: Bailiff Grand Cross of Honour and Devotion
- Mecklenburg-Strelitz: Cross for Distinction in War, 1st and 2nd Classes
- Mexico: Grand Cross of the Mexican Eagle, with Collar, 1865
- Modena: Grand Cross of the Eagle of Este, 1856
- Monaco: Grand Cross of St. Charles, 24 September 1872
- Montenegro: Grand Cross of the Order of Prince Danilo I
- Nassau: Knight of the Gold Lion of Nassau, May 1858
- Netherlands: Grand Cross of the Military William Order, 21 June 1849
- Oldenburg: Grand Cross of the Order of Duke Peter Friedrich Ludwig, with Golden Crown, 9 March 1853
- Parma: Senator Grand Cross of the Constantinian Order of St. George, with Collar, 1849
- Prussia:
  - Knight of the Black Eagle, 14 August 1844; with Collar, 1851
  - Grand Commander's Cross of the Royal House Order of Hohenzollern, 16 September 1884
  - Pour le Mérite (military), with Oak Leaves, 27 August 1914
- Romania:
  - Collar of the Order of Carol I, 1906
  - Grand Cross of the Star of Romania
- Russia:
  - Knight of St. Andrew, 30 December 1845
  - Knight of St. Alexander Nevsky
  - Knight of the White Eagle
  - Knight of St. Anna, 1st Class
  - Knight of St. George, 4th Class, 2 July 1849
- Saxe-Weimar-Eisenach: Grand Cross of the White Falcon, 1 October 1857
- Saxony:
  - Knight of the Rue Crown, 1847
  - Grand Cross of the Military Order of St. Henry
- Serbia:
  - Grand Cross of the Cross of Takovo
  - Order of Miloš the Great, 1st Class
- Siam: Knight of the Order of the Royal House of Chakri, 15 July 1891
- Spain: Grand Cross of the Order of Charles III, with Collar, 10 May 1875
- Sweden-Norway:
  - Knight of the Seraphim, with Collar, 9 July 1850
  - Knight of the Norwegian Lion, 5 April 1904
- Tuscany: Grand Cross of St. Joseph
- Two Sicilies: Knight of St. Januarius, 1848
- United Kingdom:
  - Stranger Knight Companion of the Garter, 14 August 1867 (revoked 1915)
  - Recipient of the Royal Victorian Chain, 16 August 1904 (revoked 1915)
- Württemberg: Grand Cross of the Württemberg Crown, 1850

==== Honorary appointments ====
- Honorary General of the Swedish Army, 1888
- Colonel-in-chief of the 1st King's Dragoon Guards, British Army, 25 March 1896 – 1914
- Colonel-in-chief of the Kexholm Life Guards Grenadier Regiment, Russian Army, until 26 June 1914
- Colonel-in-chief of the 12th Belgorod Lancer Regiment, Russian Army, until 26 June 1914
- Colonel-in-chief of the 16th (Schleswig-Holstein) Hussars, German Army
- Colonel-in-chief of the 122nd (Emperor Francis Joseph of Austria, King of Hungary (4th Württemberg) Fusiliers
- Honorary Colonel of the 38th León Infantry Regiment, Spanish Army, 30 November 1905
- Field Marshal of the British Army, 1 September 1903 – 1914
  Imperial Standard (From 1867 to 1915)

==== Arms and monogram ====
Lesser coat of arms of Franz Joseph I	Imperial monogram

=== Legacy ===
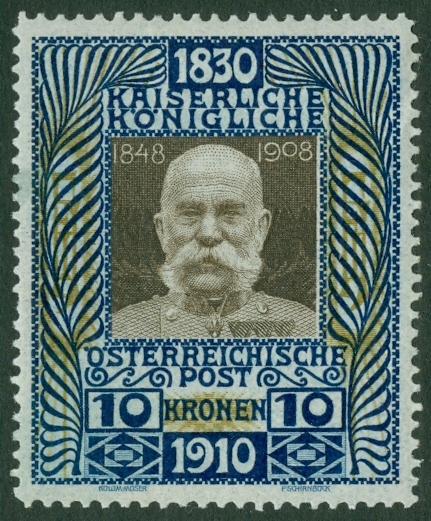
Centennial stamp

Franz Josef Land in the Russian Arctic was named in his honour in 1873 by the Austro-Hungarian North Pole expedition which first reported finding it. The Franz Josef Glacier in New Zealand's South Island also bears his name.

Franz Joseph founded in 1872 the Franz Joseph University (Hungarian: Ferenc József Tudományegyetem, Romanian: Universitatea Francisc Iosif) in the city of Cluj-Napoca (at that time a part of Austria-Hungary under the name of Kolozsvár). The university was moved to Szeged after Cluj became a part of Romania, becoming the University of Szeged.

In certain areas, celebrations are still being held in remembrance of Franz Joseph's birthday. The Mitteleuropean People's Festival takes place every year around 18 August, and is a "spontaneous, traditional and brotherly meeting among peoples of the Central-European Countries". The event includes ceremonies, meetings, music, songs, dances, wine and food tasting, and traditional costumes and folklore from Mitteleuropa.

Franz Joseph was for some time present on the Polish Żywiec Zdrój bottled water labels, before being eventually removed in favor of the Abrahamów ridge.

=== Personal motto ===
- "With united forces" (as the Emperor of Austria) – German: "Mit vereinten Kräften" – Latin: "Viribus Unitis"
- "My trust in [the ancient] virtue" (as the Apostolic King of Hungary) – Hungarian: "Bizalmam az Ősi Erényben" – Latin: "Virtutis Confido"

== Issue ==
- Archduchess Sophie of Austria (5 March 1855 – 29 May 1857).
- Archduchess Gisela of Austria (12 July 1856 – 27 July 1932). Married Prince Leopold of Bavaria (second cousin) in 1873. They had four children.
- Rudolf, Crown Prince of Austria (21 August 1858 – 30 January 1889). Married Princess Stephanie of Belgium in 1881. They had one daughter. He died in a murder–suicide.
- Archduchess Marie Valerie of Austria (22 April 1868 – 6 September 1924). Married Archduke Franz Salvator (second cousin) in 1890. They had ten children.

== Cultural representations ==
Franz Joseph figures prominently in Joseph Roth's novel Radetzky March. On screen, he was played by Karlheinz Böhm in the 1955 Austrian romance Sissi and its two sequels, Sissi: Die Junge Kaiserin (1956) and Sissi: Schicksalsjahre einer Kaiserin (1957); by Jean Dax and James Mason respectively in the 1936 and 1968 films Mayerling; and by Basil Sidney in the 1957 TV drama of the same name. In the 1974 BBC miniseries Fall of Eagles, he was portrayed by Lawrence Naismith in three early episodes and Maurice Denham in two latter ones. Franz Joseph is also a principal character in Kenneth MacMillan's 1978 ballet Mayerling.

== See also ==
- Family tree of German monarchs – he was related to every other ruler of Germany
- List of coupled cousins
- Austro-Hungarian entry into World War I
- Franc Jozeph Island, island in Albania named in honor of the Emperor.
- Order of St. George (Habsburg-Lorraine)
- Franz Josef Glacier was named after Emperor Franz Joseph I by the German geologist Julius von Haast in 1865.

== General bibliography ==
- Albertini, Luigi (2005). The Origins of the War of 1914. New York: Enigma Books.
- Murad, Anatol (1968). Franz Joseph I of Austria and his Empire. Twayne Publishers. ISBN 978-0-8290-0172-3.
- Palmer, Alan (1994). Twilight of the Habsburgs: The Life and Times of Emperor Francis Joseph. Atlantic Monthly Press. ISBN 978-0-8021-1560-7.

Franz Joseph I House of Habsburg-Lorraine Cadet branch of the House of Lorraine Born: 18 August 1830 Died: 21 November 1916
Regnal titles
Preceded by Ferdinand I & V	Emperor of Austria; King of Bohemia; King of Galicia and Lodomeria; King of Hungary; King of Croatia, Slavonia and Dalmatia; 1848–1916	Succeeded by Charles I & IV
Preceded by Ferdinand I	King of Lombardy-Venetia; 1848–1866	Italian unification
Political offices
Preceded by Ferdinand I of Austria	Head of the Präsidialmacht Austria; 1850–1866	Succeeded by Wilhelm I of Prussia as Holder of the Bundespräsidium of the North German Confederation
