= Princess Sophie of Bavaria =

Bavarian princess turned Archduchess of Austria (1805–1872)

- Archduchess of Austria
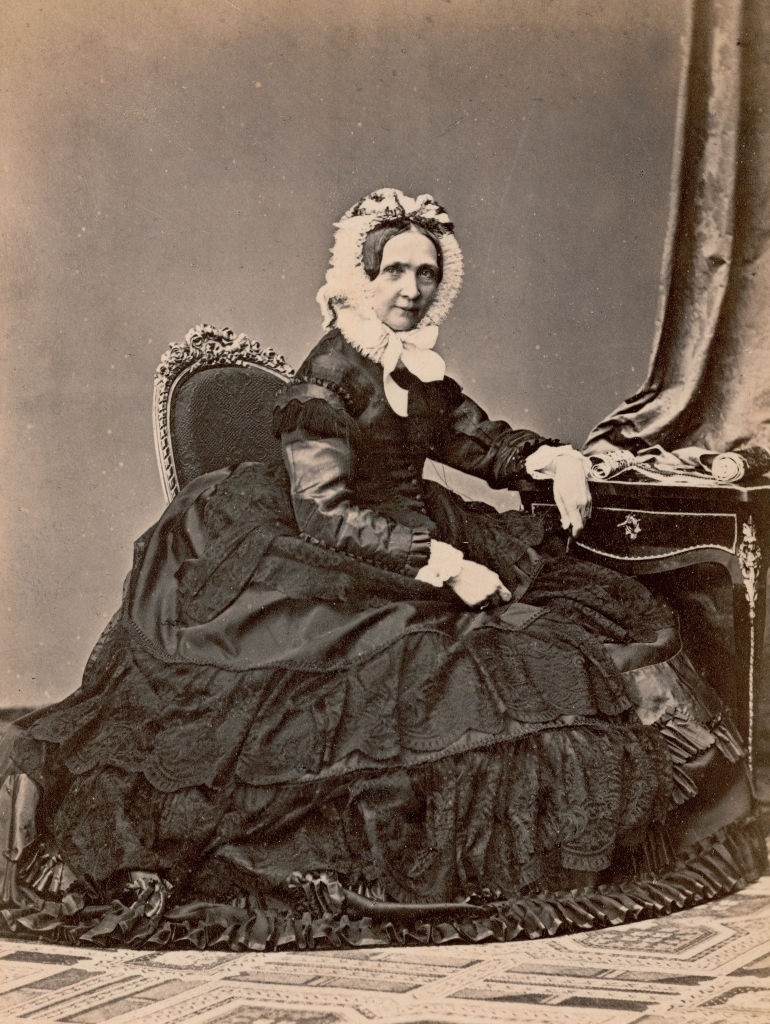
- Photograph c. 1866
- Born: 27 January 1805; Nymphenburg Palace, Munich, Electorate of Bavaria, Holy Roman Empire
- Died: 28 May 1872 (aged 67); Vienna, Austria-Hungary
- Burial: Imperial Crypt
- Spouse: Archduke Franz Karl of Austria (m. 1824)
- Issue Detail: Franz Joseph I of Austria; Maximilian I of Mexico; Archduke Karl Ludwig; Archduchess Maria Anna; Archduke Ludwig Viktor
Names
- Sophie Friederike Dorothea Wilhelmine
- House: Wittelsbach
- Father: Maximilian I Joseph of Bavaria
- Mother: Caroline of Baden

Princess Sophie of Bavaria (Sophie Friederike Dorothea Wilhelmine; German: [zoˈfiː ˌfʁiːdəˈʁiːkə doʁoˈteːa vɪlhɛlˈmiːnə]; 27 January 1805 – 28 May 1872) was the daughter of King Maximilian I Joseph of Bavaria and his second wife, Caroline of Baden. The identical twin sister of Queen Maria Anna of Saxony, Sophie became Archduchess of Austria by marriage to Archduke Franz Karl of Austria. Her eldest son, Franz Joseph, reigned as Emperor of Austria and King of Hungary; her second son, Maximilian, briefly reigned as Emperor of Mexico.

== Childhood (1805–1824) ==
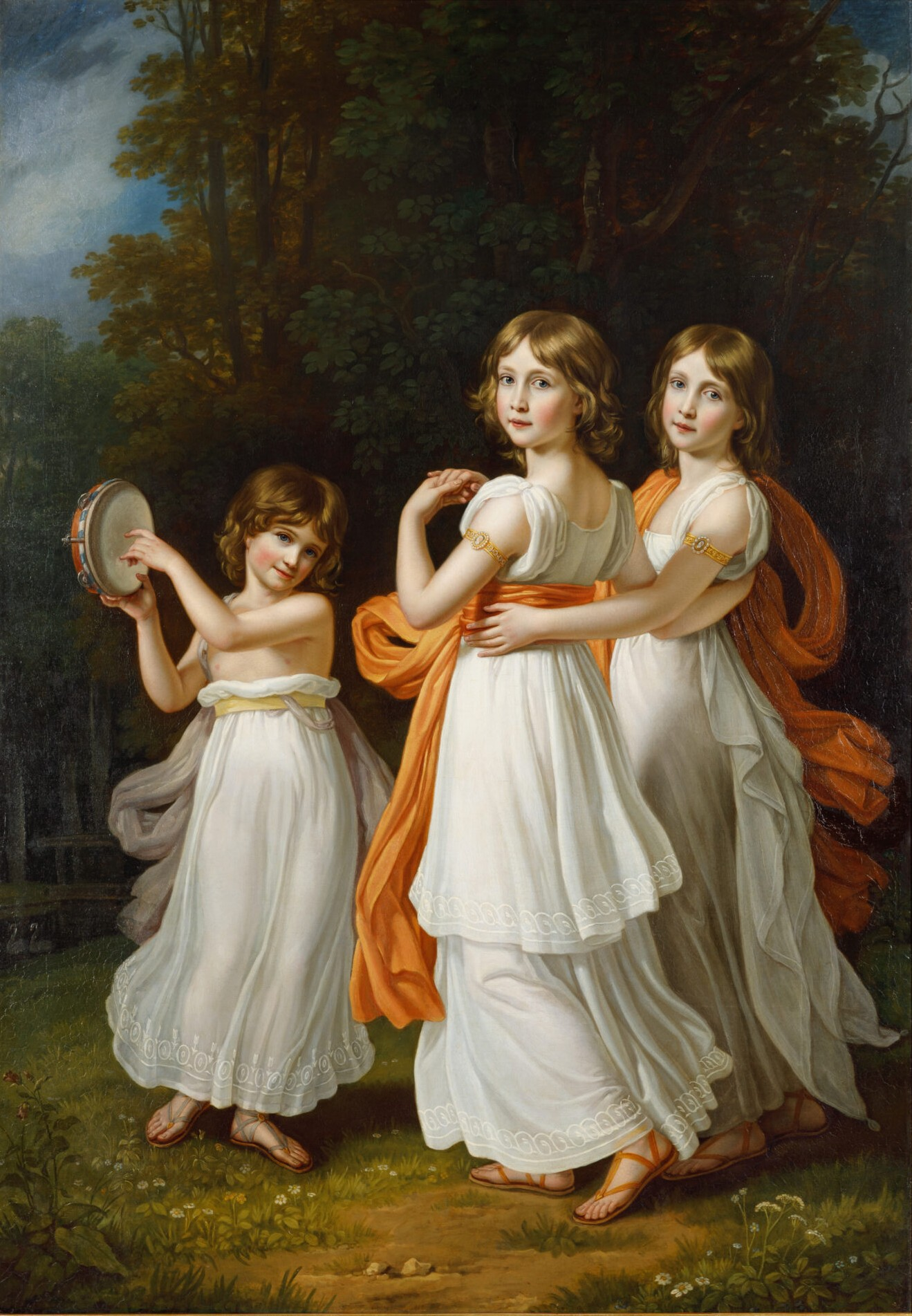
Portrait of Princesses Sophie, Ludovika, and Maria Anna (painting by Karl Joseph Karl Stieler, 1822)

The fourth child of King Maximilian I Joseph of Bavaria and Princess Caroline of Baden, Princess Sophie Friederike Dorothea Wilhelmine was born on 27 January 1805 in Nymphenburg Palace, Munich. She was said to be her father’s favorite daughter, although she was more attached to her mother, whom she loved dearly. Sophie adored her twin sister Maria Anna and was very close to all her sisters.

== Archduchess of Austria (1824–1872) ==
On 4 November 1824, she married Archduke Franz Karl of Austria. Her paternal half-sister, Caroline Augusta of Bavaria, had married the groom's widowed father, Francis II, in 1816. Sophie and Franz Karl had six children. Emperor Francis II was truly fond of Sophie. Although Sophie had little in common with her husband, she was a caring and devoted wife to Franz Karl who loved and respected her.

Unlike her husband, Sophie was attached to all of her children, especially Franz Joseph, as well as Ferdinand Maximilian, who was her favorite son. She had a reputation for being strong-willed and authoritarian by nature but she was also known as a familiar and sociable person devoted to her family and the Habsburg empire she married into. She enjoyed court life, dance, art, and literature as well as horse riding.

Her ambition to place her eldest son on the Austrian throne was a constant theme in Austrian politics. At the time she was called "the only man at court". During the Revolution of 1848, she persuaded her somewhat feeble-minded husband to give up his rights to the throne in favour of their son Franz Joseph.

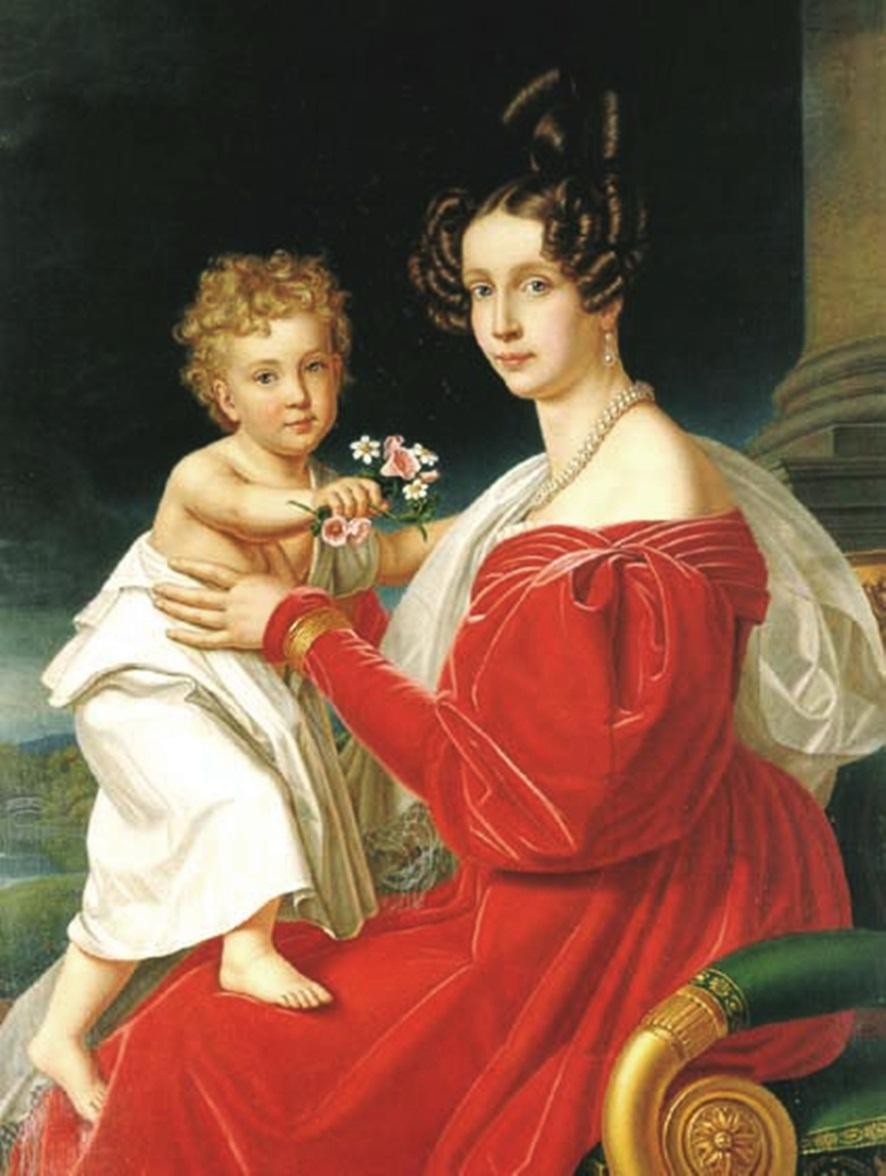
Archduchess Sophie and her son, the future emperor Franz Joseph (by Joseph Karl Stieler)

After Franz Joseph's accession, Sophie became the power behind the throne. Historically, Sophie is remembered for her extremely adversarial relationship with Franz Joseph's wife Elisabeth, or "Sisi", who was also her niece. Elisabeth hated Sophie for being demanding and controlling the upbringing of her children, but there is no evidence that the Archduchess reciprocated that hatred, as Elisabeth is usually described quite pleasantly in Sophie's diary and letters. Nonetheless, she had better relationships with her other daughters-in-law and was a caring mother-in-law to Archduchess Maria Annunziata.

Sophie kept a detailed diary most of her life, which reveals much about Austrian court life. She was deeply affected in 1867 by the execution in Mexico of her second son Maximilian. She never recovered from that shock, and withdrew from public life. She died from pneumonia in 1872.

=== Alleged extramarital affair ===
She was also noted for her close relationship with her nephew-by-marriage the Duke of Reichstadt, the former Napoleon II. There were rumors of a sexual affair between them. There was even suspicion that her son Maximilian, born two weeks before Reichstadt's death in 1832, was actually his child. These claims were never verified, but it is certain that they were very good friends and that his death affected her very much. She is said to have turned into the hard, ambitious woman described in fiction after he died.

== Children ==
Name	Birth	Death	Notes
Franz Joseph	18 August 1830	21 November 1916	Succeeded as Emperor of Austria; Married his first cousin Elisabeth, Duchess in Bavaria, and had issue
Maximilian I of Mexico	6 July 1832	19 June 1867	Proclaimed Emperor of Mexico; Executed by firing squad Married Charlotte, Princess of Belgium, and had no issue
Karl Ludwig	30 July 1833	19 May 1896	Married: 1) his first cousin Margaretha, Princess of and Duchess in Saxony (1840–1858) from 1856 to 1858, no issue 2) Maria Annunziata, Princess of the Two Sicilies (1843–1871) from 1862 to 1871, had issue (three sons and one daughter); 3) Maria Theresa, Infanta of Portugal (1855–1944), from 1873 to 1896, had issue (two daughters). He was the father of Archduke Franz Ferdinand, whose assassination in 1914 sparked World War I. Through his son Archduke Otto Franz, Archduke Karl Ludwig was also the grandfather of Austria's last Emperor, Charles I. Through his daughter Archduchess Elisabeth Amalie, Archduke Karl Ludwig is an ancestor of the House of Liechtenstein.
Maria Anna	27 October 1835	5 February 1840	Died in childhood
Stillborn son	24 October 1840	24 October 1840	
Ludwig Viktor	15 May 1842	18 January 1919	Died unmarried

== Portrayal on stage and screen ==
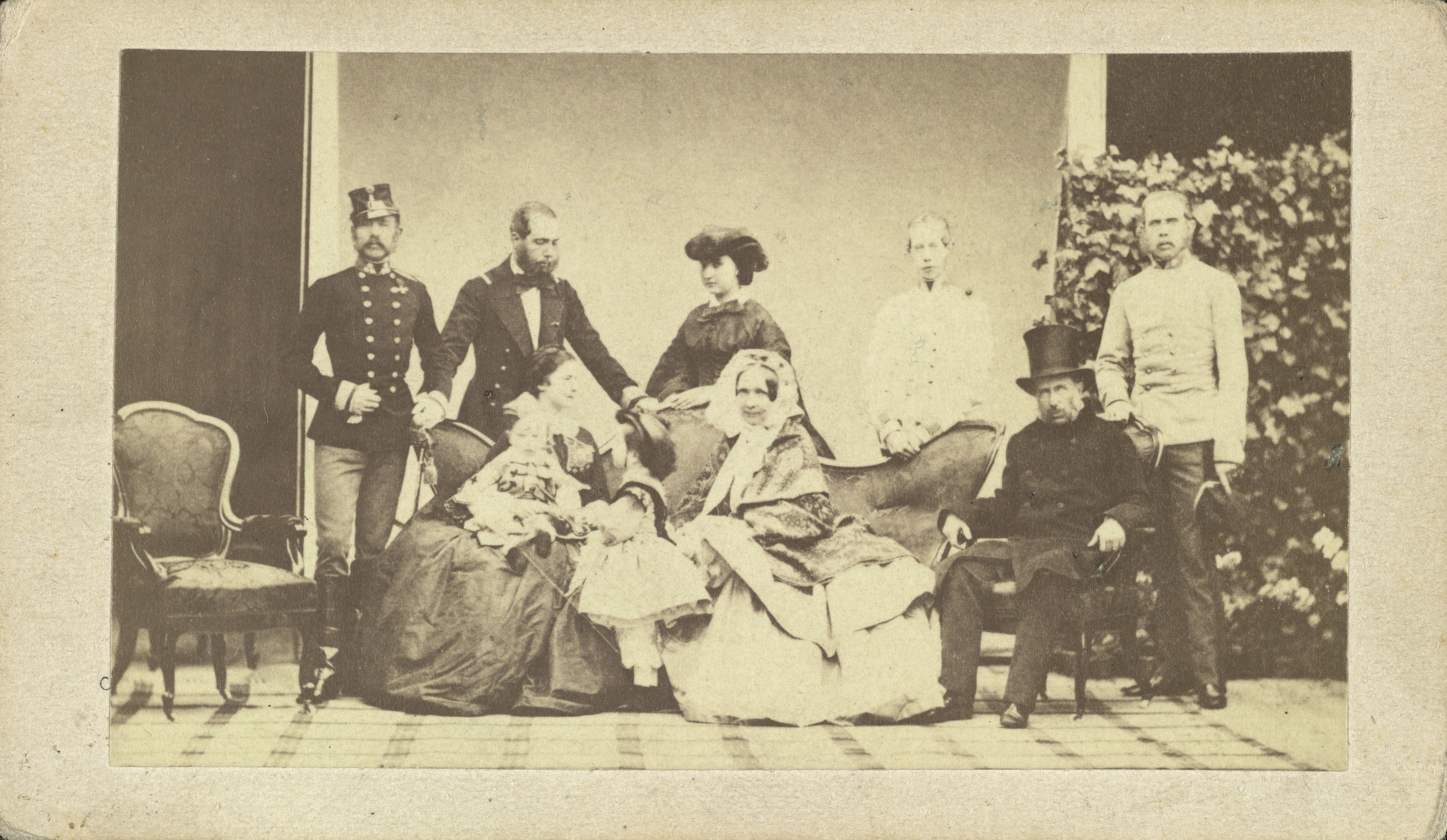
Archduchess Sophie (front row, seated, second from left) with family members, 1860).

- In the Sissi films (1955–1957), Vilma Degischer played the part of Sophie as a chillingly strict mother-in-law of the young Empress.
- In the 1974 miniseries, Fall of Eagles, Sophie was portrayed by English actress Pamela Brown.
- Mayerling, a 1978 ballet by Kenneth MacMillan, features Sophie in a slightly more sympathetic light.
- Elisabeth, a 1992 musical by Michael Kunze about the life of Empress Elisabeth, where Sophie is portrayed as a malevolent intriguer, out to ruin her daughter-in-law's life by any possible means, though more recent productions have somewhat softened her character with additional scenes and a song that give more insight into Sophie's complex motivations and personality.
- In the 1997 animated series Princess Sissi, Sophie is portrayed in a highly fictionalized manner as one of the main antagonists, voiced by Marloes van den Heuvel.
- In Sissi, l'impératrice rebelle, a 2004 French television film, Sophie was played by Stéphane Audran.
- In the 2007 animated film parody Lissi and the Wild Emperor, she is parodied as "Empress Mother Sybille," voiced by Lotte Ledl.
- In the 2009 European miniseries Sisi, Martina Gedeck portrayed Sophie in one of the more balanced interpretations of the character.
- The 2022 Netflix series The Empress features a Sophie played by Melika Foroutan.

== Honours ==
- Austria-Hungary : Dame of the Order of the Starry Cross
