= Archduke Ludwig Viktor of Austria =

Austrian archduke (1842–1919)

Archduke Ludwig Viktor
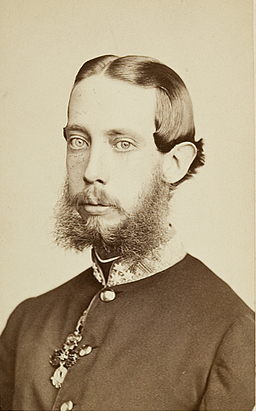
- Portrait by Ludwig Angerer
- Born: 15 May 1842; Hofburg Palace, Vienna, Austrian Empire
- Died: 18 January 1919 (aged 76); Schloss Klessheim, Austria
- Burial: Siezenheim Cemetery
Names
- German: Ludwig Viktor Joseph Anton von Österreich; English: Louis Victor Joseph Anthony of Austria
- House: Habsburg-Lorraine
- Father: Archduke Franz Karl of Austria
- Mother: Princess Sophie of Bavaria

Archduke Ludwig Viktor Joseph Anton of Austria (15 May 1842 – 18 January 1919) was the youngest child of Archduke Franz Karl of Austria and Princess Sophie of Bavaria, and the youngest brother of Emperor Franz Joseph I. He had a military career, as was usual for archdukes, but did not take part in politics. He was openly homosexual and declined to marry princesses who were sought for him. He is well known for his art collection and patronage as well as philanthropy.

== Family ==
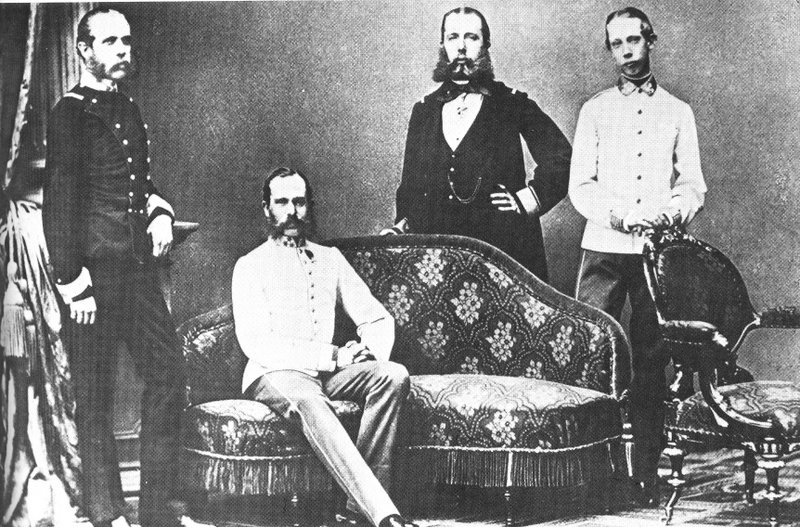
Ludwig Viktor (r.) with his brothers Karl Ludwig, Franz Joseph and Maximilian

Ludwig Viktor was born in Vienna. He was the youngest son born to Archduke Franz Karl of Austria and Princess Sophie of Bavaria. His elder siblings included Emperor Franz Joseph I of Austria, Emperor Maximilian I of Mexico, and Archduke Karl Ludwig. His family called him by the nickname "Luziwuzi".

== Career ==
Monarchical styles of Archduke Ludwig Viktor of Austria
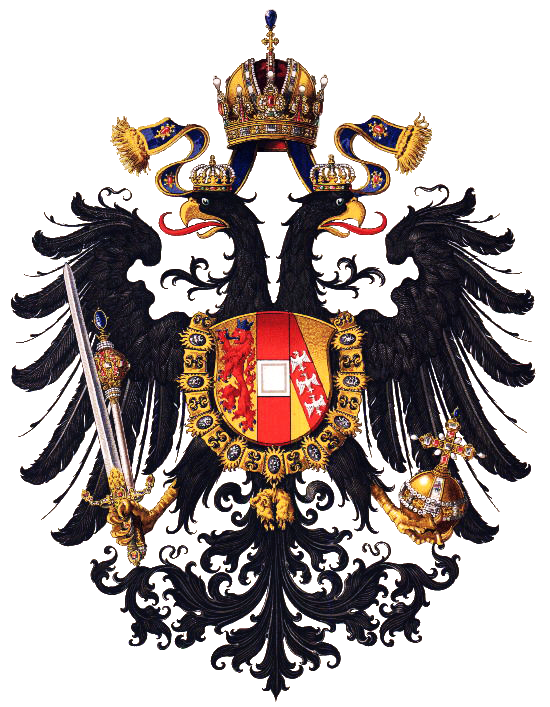
- Reference style: His Imperial and Royal Highness
- Spoken style: Your Imperial and Royal Highness

During the Revolutions of 1848 in the Austrian Empire and the Vienna Uprising, Ludwig Viktor and his family had to flee the Austrian capital, at first to Innsbruck, later to Olomouc. Ludwig Viktor pursued the usual military career and was appointed General of the Infantry, but had no intentions to interfere in politics. He rejected his brother Maximilian's ambitions in the Second Mexican Empire. Instead he concentrated on building up his own art collection and had Heinrich von Ferstel design and build a city palace on the new Schwarzenbergplatz in Vienna, where Ludwig Viktor hosted homophile soirées.

== Personal life ==
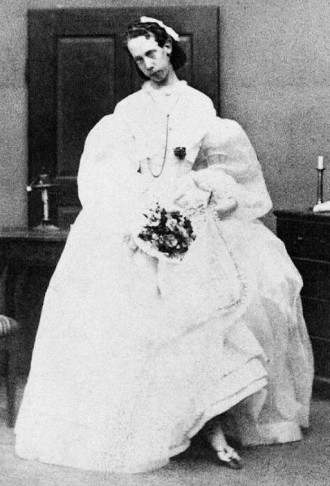
Ludwig Viktor dressed in women's clothing

Ludwig Viktor's mother attempted to arrange a marriage for him with Duchess Sophie Charlotte in Bavaria, youngest sister of Empress Elisabeth, but he declined. He likewise rejected plans to marry him to Princess Isabel, daughter and heir presumptive of Emperor Pedro II of Brazil. In 1863, Ludwig Viktor's brother Maximilian had tried to persuade him to marry her because "such a marriage might found yet another Habsburg dynasty in Latin America.... Maximilian wrote to Franz Joseph that Ludwig Viktor was 'anything but pleased with the idea,'" and asked Franz Joseph to order Ludwig Viktor to marry her. Franz Joseph refused.

Ludwig Viktor was "a homosexual and cross-dresser with a reputation as a libertine." After a scandalous incident at the Central Bathhouse Vienna in which he was publicly slapped, his brother Emperor Franz Joseph finally forbade him to stay in Vienna and joked that he should be given a ballerina as adjutant to keep him out of trouble.

Ludwig Viktor retired to Schloss Klessheim near Salzburg where he became known as a philanthropist and patron of the arts. He died in 1919, at the age of 76, and is buried at the Siezenheim cemetery. He was the last surviving grandchild of Francis II, Holy Roman Emperor.

== Honours ==
He received the following orders and decorations:

- Austrian Empire:
  - Knight of the Golden Fleece, 1862
  - Grand Cross of the Royal Hungarian Order of St. Stephen, 1893
- Sovereign Military Order of Malta: Bailiff Grand Cross of Honour and Devotion, with Distinction for Jerusalem
- Russian Empire:
  - Knight of St. Andrew
  - Knight of St. Alexander Nevsky
  - Knight of the White Eagle
  - Knight of St. Anna, 1st Class
- United Kingdom: Honorary Grand Cross of the Royal Victorian Order, 9 October 1903
- Kingdom of Prussia:
  - Knight of the Black Eagle, 24 August 1863
  - Knight of the Red Eagle, 1st Class
- France: Grand Cross of the Legion of Honour
- Kingdom of Italy: Knight of the Annunciation, 21 September 1873
  - (Kingdom of the Two Sicilies) Two Sicilian Royal Family: Grand Cross of St. Ferdinand and Merit
  - (Tuscany) Tuscan Grand Ducal Family: Grand Cross of St. Joseph
- Kingdom of Bavaria: Knight of St. Hubert, 1867
- Kingdom of Saxony: Knight of the Rue Crown, 1865
- Spain: Grand Cross of the Order of Charles III, 28 September 1891
- Württemberg: Grand Cross of the Württemberg Crown, 1867
- Sweden-Norway: Knight of the Seraphim, 19 April 1885
- Belgium: Grand Cordon of the Order of Leopold
- Kingdom of Greece: Grand Cross of the Redeemer
- Kingdom of Romania: Grand Cross of the Star of Romania
- Principality of Serbia:
  - Grand Cross of the Cross of Takovo
  - Grand Cross of the White Eagle
- Siam: Knight of the Order of the Royal House of Chakri, 23 June 1897
- Grand Duchy of Hesse: Grand Cross of the Ludwig Order, 26 July 1858
- Saxe-Weimar-Eisenach: Grand Cross of the White Falcon, 2 September 1864
- Mecklenburg: Grand Cross of the Wendish Crown, with Crown in Ore
- (Duchy of Nassau) Nassau Ducal Family: Knight of the Gold Lion of Nassau
- Brunswick: Grand Cross of the Order of Henry the Lion, 1876
- (Saxe-Coburg and Gotha) (Duchy of Saxe-Altenburg) (Saxe-Meiningen) Ernestine duchies: Grand Cross of the Saxe-Ernestine House Order

== Ancestry ==
Ancestors of Archduke Ludwig Viktor of Austria

8. Leopold II, Holy Roman Emperor
4. Francis II, Holy Roman Emperor
9. Infanta Maria Louisa of Spain
2. Archduke Franz Karl of Austria
10. Ferdinand I of the Two Sicilies
5. Princess Maria Theresa of Naples and Sicily
11. Archduchess Maria Carolina of Austria
1. Archduke Ludwig Viktor of Austria
12. Frederick Michael, Count Palatine of Zweibrücken
6. Maximilian I Joseph of Bavaria
13. Countess Palatine Maria Franziska of Sulzbach
3. Princess Sophie of Bavaria
14. Charles Louis, Hereditary Prince of Baden
7. Princess Caroline of Baden
15. Princess Amalie of Hesse-Darmstadt
