= Archduchess Maria Anna of Austria (born 1835) =

Austrian Archduchess

Archduchess Maria Anna
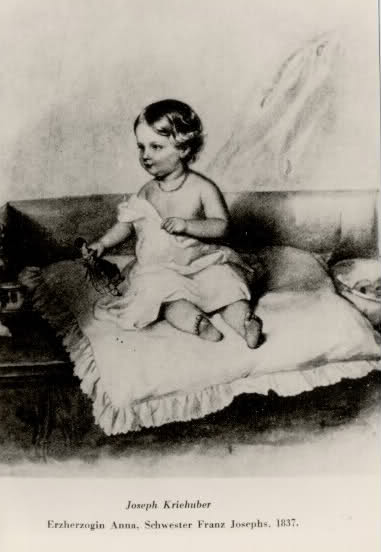
- Lithograph by Josef Kriehuber, 1837
- Born: 27 October 1835; Vienna, Austrian Empire
- Died: 5 February 1840 (aged 4); Vienna, Austrian Empire
- Burial: Imperial Crypt, Vienna
- Father: Archduke Franz Karl of Austria
- Mother: Princess Sophie of Bavaria

Archduchess Maria Anna of Austria (27 October 1835 – 5 February 1840) was by birth an Archduchess of Austria and a member of the House of Habsburg. She was the fourth child and only daughter of Archduke Franz Karl of Austria and Princess Sophie of Bavaria. Maria Anna died in childhood due to epilepsy.

== Life ==
Named in honor of her paternal aunt Maria Anna of Savoy, Archduchess Maria Anna of Austria was born on 27 October 1835, in Vienna, Austria. Her father was Archduke Franz Karl of Austria and her mother was Princess Sophie of Bavaria. She was baptized with the names of Maria Anna Karolina Annunziata Johanna Josepha Gabriela Theresa Katharina Margaretha Philomena, although in the family she was called Ännchen.

At birth, she seemed to be robust, however, she soon started to show signs of epilepsy, (Note: Epilepsy was run among the descendants of Emperor Leopold II.) and had died at the early age of 4 after a violent seizure. She was buried in the Ferdinand Vault at the Imperial Crypt, in Vienna.

== Ancestry ==
Ancestors of Maria Anna of Austria

8. Leopold II, Holy Roman Emperor
4. Francis II, Holy Roman Emperor
9. Infanta Maria Louisa of Spain
2. Archduke Franz Karl of Austria
10. Ferdinand I of the Two Sicilies
5. Princess Maria Theresa of Naples and Sicily
11. Archduchess Maria Carolina of Austria
1. Archduchess María Anna of Austria
12. Frederick Michael, Count Palatine of Zweibrücken
6. Maximilian I Joseph of Bavaria
13. Countess Palatine Maria Franziska of Sulzbach
3. Princess Sophie of Bavaria
14. Charles Louis, Hereditary Prince of Baden
7. Princess Caroline of Baden
15. Princess Amalie of Hesse-Darmstadt

== Bibliography ==
- Egon Caesar Conte Corti: Vom Kind zum Kaiser. Die Jugend Kaiser Franz Josefs und seiner Brüder. Band 1 von Kaiser Franz Joseph I. Pustet, 1950.
- Cölestin Wolfsgruber: Die Kaisergruft bei den Kapuzinern in Wien. ed. Alfred Hölder, 1887, N°. 87, p. 307 ff. online
- Constantin von Wurzbach: Habsburg, Franz Karl Joseph in: Biographisches Lexikon des Kaiserthums Oesterreich, vol. 6. Kaiserlich-königliche Hof- und Staatsdruckerei, Vienna 1861, p. 357 online
