= Foroutan =

Foroutan (Persian: فروتن), also romanized as Forootan, Forotan, Forutan and Furutan, is a Persian surname meaning "Meek" or "Humble". People with the surname include:

- ʻAlí-Akbar Furútan (1905–2003), Iranian historian, Baháʼí educator and author
- Bahman Foroutan (born 1947), Iranian football manager
- Farahnaz Forotan (born 1992), Afghan journalist and women's rights activist
- Masoud Forootan (born 1946), Iranian author, actor and television personality
- Melika Foroutan (born 1976), German-Iranian actress
- Mohammad Reza Foroutan (born 1968), Iranian actor and singer
- Naika Foroutan (born 1971), German social scientist
- Saleh Foroutan (born 1994), Iranian basketball player
