= Der Fürst und das Mädchen =

Television series

- Starring: Maximilian Schell; Daniela Ziegler; Franco Nero; Arthur Brauss; Melika Foroutan; Tessa Mittelstaedt; Thomas Heinze; Dennenesch Zoudé; Dorka Gryllus; Hans Peter Korff
- Country of origin: Germany

Original release
- Network: ZDF

Der Fürst und das Mädchen is a German drama television series that was produced from 2002 to 2007.

The series was filmed at Glücksburg Castle in Schleswig-Holstein. Other filming locations included the Outer Alster Lake and the Port of Hamburg.

== See also ==
- List of German television series
