= Schauspielschule Bochum =

Drama school in Bochum, Germany

Coordinates: 51°28′43″N 07°14′14″E

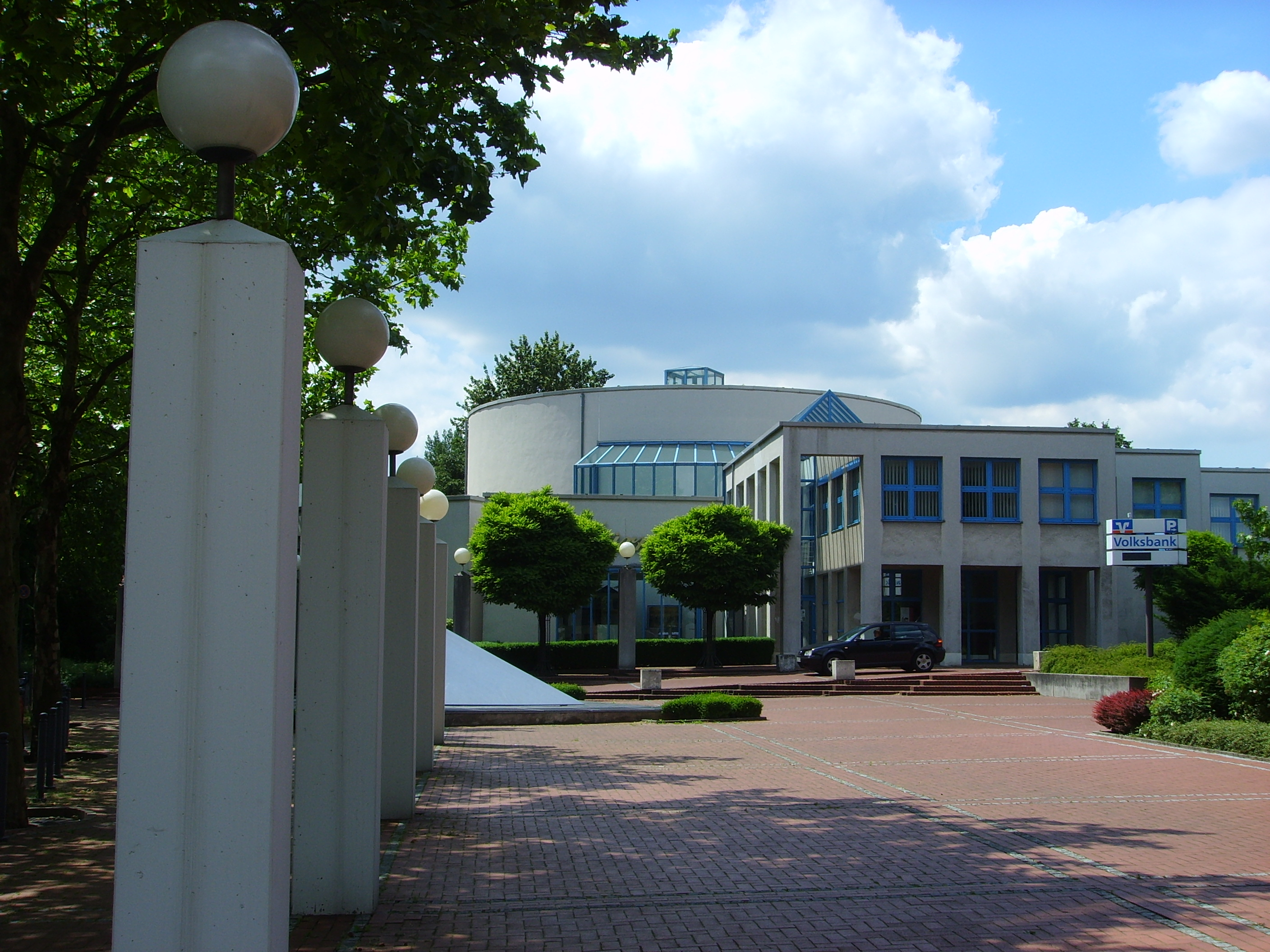
- Location at the Thürmer-Saal in the centre of Bochum
- Bochum; Germany

Information
- Type: Drama school
- Established: 1939
- Founder: Saladin Schmitt
- School district: Wiemelhausem
- Language: German
- Website: Official website

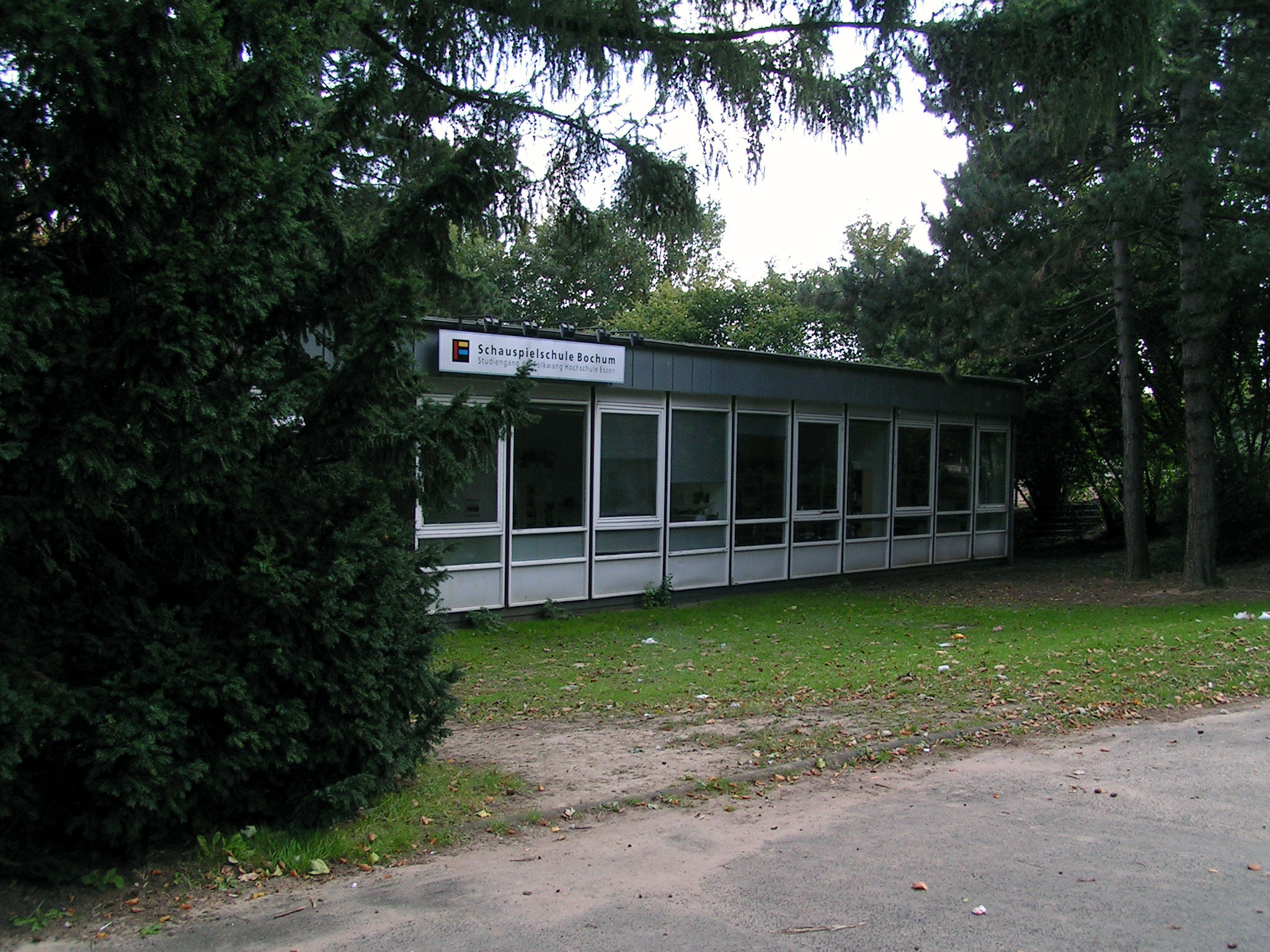
Former location, Lohring

Schauspielschule Bochum is the informal name of a drama school in Bochum, North Rhine-Westphalia, Germany, which is now part of the Folkwang University of the Arts. It has a long tradition, being founded in 1939 as Westfälische Schauspielschule Bochum.

== History ==
The drama school was founded in 1939 as the Westfälische Schauspielschule Bochum by Saladin Schmitt, then intendant of the Schauspielhaus Bochum. It was originally a municipal school. Up to the 1970s, the intendant was also the artistic director of the drama school. In 2000, it became a state school of North Rhine-Westphalia and a Bochum location of the Folkwang-Hochschule.

In 2014, the main location of the drama school changed to the new Folkwang-Theaterzentrum (Folkwang theatre centre) in Wiemelhausen, close to the centre of Bochum. It has two stages, the Großer Saal and the Black Box (in the former Thürmer-Saal), as well as classrooms and rehearsal and meeting rooms. Now part of the Folkwang University of the Arts, the drama school is a member of the Ständige Konferenz Schauspielausbildung.

== Studies ==
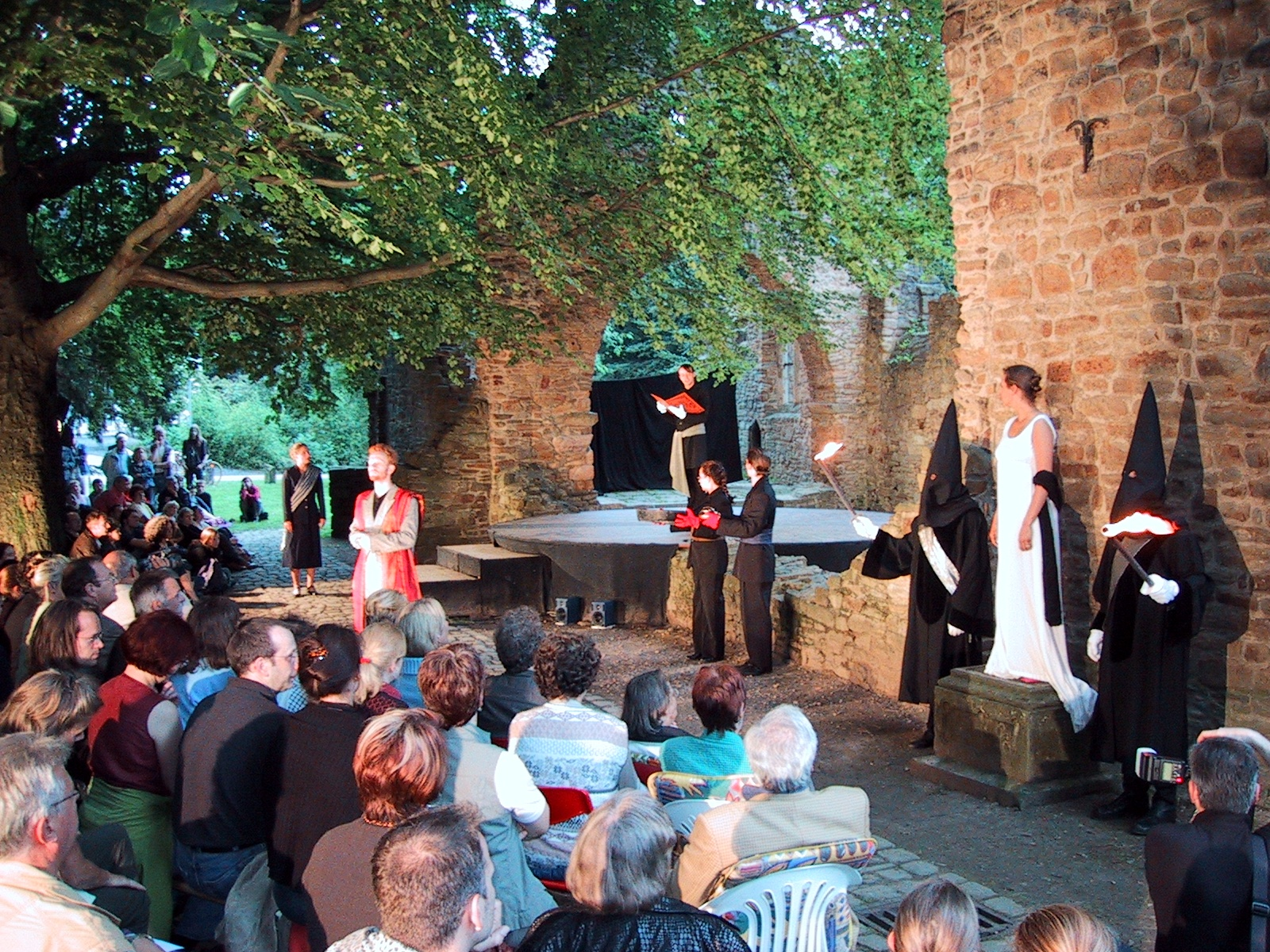
Performance at the park of Haus Weitmar in 2001

The curriculum is planned for eight semesters, four of them for fundamental training of voice, speech, and body movement. Students take part in a production of Schauspielhaus Bochum during their third year in order to achieve insight into theatre practise. During the last semester, students are offered practical work at various German-speaking theatres. They also receive courses in acting in front of a camera, in collaboration with the broadcaster Westdeutscher Rundfunk Köln. The second-year students give a performance in the summer at Haus Weitmar. Traditionally, a play or scenes by Shakespeare are presented.

== Alumni ==
- Dietmar Bär
- Henning Baum
- Natja Brunckhorst
- Lambert Hamel
- Fabian Hinrichs
- Rolf Kanies
- Michael Kessler
- Ignaz Kirchner
- Peter Lohmeyer
- Krystian Martinek
- Tessa Mittelstaedt
- Richy Müller
- Uwe Ochsenknecht
- Nina Petri
- Andreas Pietschmann
- Christian Quadflieg
- Roland Reber
- Christian Redl
- Walter Renneisen
- Ralf Richter
- Esther Schweins
- Martin Wuttke
- Manfred Zapatka
- Daniela Ziegler
