= Lambert Hamel =

German actor (1940–2026)

- Hamel c. 2000
- Born: 7 June 1940; Ludwigshafen, Gau Westmark, German Reich
- Died: 13 February 2026 (aged 85); Munich, Bavaria, Germany
- Education: Schauspielschule Bochum
- Occupation: Actor
- Organizations: Deutsches Schauspielhaus; Schauspiel Bochum; Residenztheater; Münchner Kammerspiele

Lambert Hamel (7 June 1940 – 13 February 2026) was a German actor best known for roles on stage but also active in film, television, musicals, and as a dubbing actor. Trained at the Schauspielschule Bochum, he was often cast in roles of villains and buffoons. Hamel played both Martin Luther and Helmut Kohl in television films, and he appeared in many popular television crime series. He performed at the Munich theatres Residenztheater and Münchner Kammerspiele from 1968, in roles such as Shakespeare's Bottom and Titus Andronicus, Arthur Miller's Willy Loman, and Thomas Bernhard's Theatre maker.

== Life and career ==
Hamel was born in Ludwigshafen on 7 June 1940. He grew up with two sisters. He knew early on that he wanted to become an actor, though his father disapproved. He took German studies, philosophy, and theatre studies from 1960 to 1962 at the universities of Heidelberg and Cologne. He then completed acting training at the Schauspielschule Bochum, with Hans Schalla. While still in training, director Oscar Fritz Schuh brought him to the Deutsches Schauspielhaus in Hamburg, where he made his debut in 1963 as Thomas Diaforius in Molière's The Imaginary Invalid, directed by Fritz Kortner.

In 1964, Hamel moved to the Schauspiel Bochum, then briefly to the Bühnen der Stadt Köln, where he appeared as Artur in Mrożek 's Tango. From 1968, he worked for the Residenztheater in Munich, engaged by Helmut Henrichs, who had seen him in Cologne. He made his successful debut there in the title role of Molière's George Dandin.

From 1973 to 2001, Hamel was a permanent ensemble member at the Münchner Kammerspiele. In a production of Shakespeare's A Midsummer Night's Dream, he played Bottom. He was cast as Bruscon, the "theatre maker", the title role in Thomas Bernhard's Der Theatermacher in 1988, regarded as a signature role. He returned to the Residenztheater for the 2001/02 season, where he played Agamemnon in Hekabe by Euripides and Sosias in Kleist's Amphitryon, both directed by Dieter Dorn in 2001. He played the Rittmeister in The Father by Strindberg, directed by Thomas Langhoff in 2001, He held the title role in Shakespeare's Titus Andronicus, and portrayed Estragon in Beckett's Waiting for Godot, both directed by Elmar Goerden. He appeared as Theseus in Racine's Phädra and as Zauberkönig in Horváth's Geschichten aus dem Wiener Wald in 2005, both directed by Barbara Frey. Hamel portrayed the title role of Ibsen's Baumeister Solness in 2006, Willy Loman in Miller's Tod eines Handlungsreisenden in 2007, and Adam in Kleist's Der zerbrochne Krug in 2009, all staged by Tina Lanik. He took part in guest engagements at the Salzburg Festival and at the Burgtheater in Vienna. He played Werner von Späth in Thomas Jonigk's Hotel Capri at the Residenztheater in Munich in 2014.

In musical theatre, he appeared as Alfred Doolittle in the musical My Fair Lady and as Oberst Ollendorf in Millöcker's operetta Der Bettelstudent. In 1996, he was director of Leo Fall's operetta Madame Pompadour at the Gärtnerplatztheater.

Hamel acted in numerous film and television productions. He portrayed the title role in Rainer Wolffhardt's Martin Luther (1983), and he played Helmut Kohl in Hans-Christoph Blumenberg's Deutschlandspiel (2000). He acted in the 2019 film Und tot bist Du!, directed by Marcus O. Rosenmüller. He appeared in popular crime series, including Derrick, Tatort, and Der Alte, often portraying nasty characters. He also acted in Der Bergdoktor and Pfarrer Braun. He read audio books and dubbed the voices of Philippe Noiret, Charlton Heston, Richard Widmark, and Edward G. Robinson.

Hamel died in Munich on 13 February 2026, at the age of 85, after a short illness.

== Selected filmography ==
=== Film ===
Films with Hamel include:

List of film appearances, with year, title, and role shown
Year	Title	English title	Role
1983	Wagner		Betz
1985	Vergeßt Mozart	Forget Mozart	Voice of Franz Demel
1987	Der Unsichtbare	The Invisible	Dorfmann
1987	Der Angriff	The Aggression	Wendt
2007	Mein Führer – Die wirklich wahrste Wahrheit über Adolf Hitler	My Führer – The Really Truest Truth about Adolf Hitler	Obergruppenführer Rattenhuber

=== Television ===
Hamel appeared in television series, including:

List of television appearances, with year, title, and role shown
Year	Title	English title	Role	Notes
1970–72	Der Kommissar		Brassmann	2 episodes
1975–88	Derrick		Bruno Wollweber	3 episodes
1980	Auf Achse		Commissioner Huber	1 episode
1983	Das Traumschiff	The Dream Ship	Mr. Gerold	1 episode
1983	Martin Luther		Martin Luther	Television film
1988/1998	Liebling Kreuzberg		Giovanni Lara	2 episodes
1995–2011	Tatort		Dr. Herbert / Jochen Rakuscha	2 episodes
1995–2015	Der Alte	The Old Fox	Various roles	4 episodes
1998–2002	Vater wider Willen		Artistic Director Vogt	21 episodes
2000	Deutschlandspiel		Helmut Kohl	Television film
2001	Stubbe – Von Fall zu Fall		Gisbert Gotzkowsky	1 episode
2001	Dr. Stefan Frank – Der Arzt, dem die Frauen vertrauen		Paul Krüger	1 episode
2002	Edel & Starck		Dr. Schiller	2 episodes
2004	Heiter bis tödlich: München 7		KO Dieter	1 episode
2005	Kanzleramt	Chancellery	Malte Unger	2 episodes
2013–2015	Der Bergdoktor	The Mountain Doctor	Dr. Fendrich	13 episodes
2009/2014	Pfarrer Braun	Father Brown	Abbot Emmeram Stelzenbach / Oskar Wendel	2 episodes
2019	Und tot bist Du!	And Dead You Are!	Hermann Natterer	Television film

== Cited sources ==
- Dultz, Sabine (17 February 2026). "Das große Kind: Zum Tod von Lambert Hamel" [The Big Child: On the Death of Lambert Hamel]. Münchner Merkur (in German).
- Hintermeier, Hannes (18 February 2026). "Poetischer Polterer". FAZ (in German).
- "Lambert Hamel". Deutsche Synchronkartei (in German).
- "Lambert Hamel". Fernsehserien (in German).
- "Lambert Hamel". Deutsches Filmhaus (in German).
- "Lambert Hamel". Filmportal (in German).
- "Lambert Hamel". Munzinger-Archiv (in German).
- "Lambert Hamel – Infos und Filme". Prisma (in German).
- "Schauspieler Lambert Hamel ist tot". Der Spiegel (in German). dpa. 17 February 2026.
