= Haus Weitmar =

Former residence in Bochum, Germany

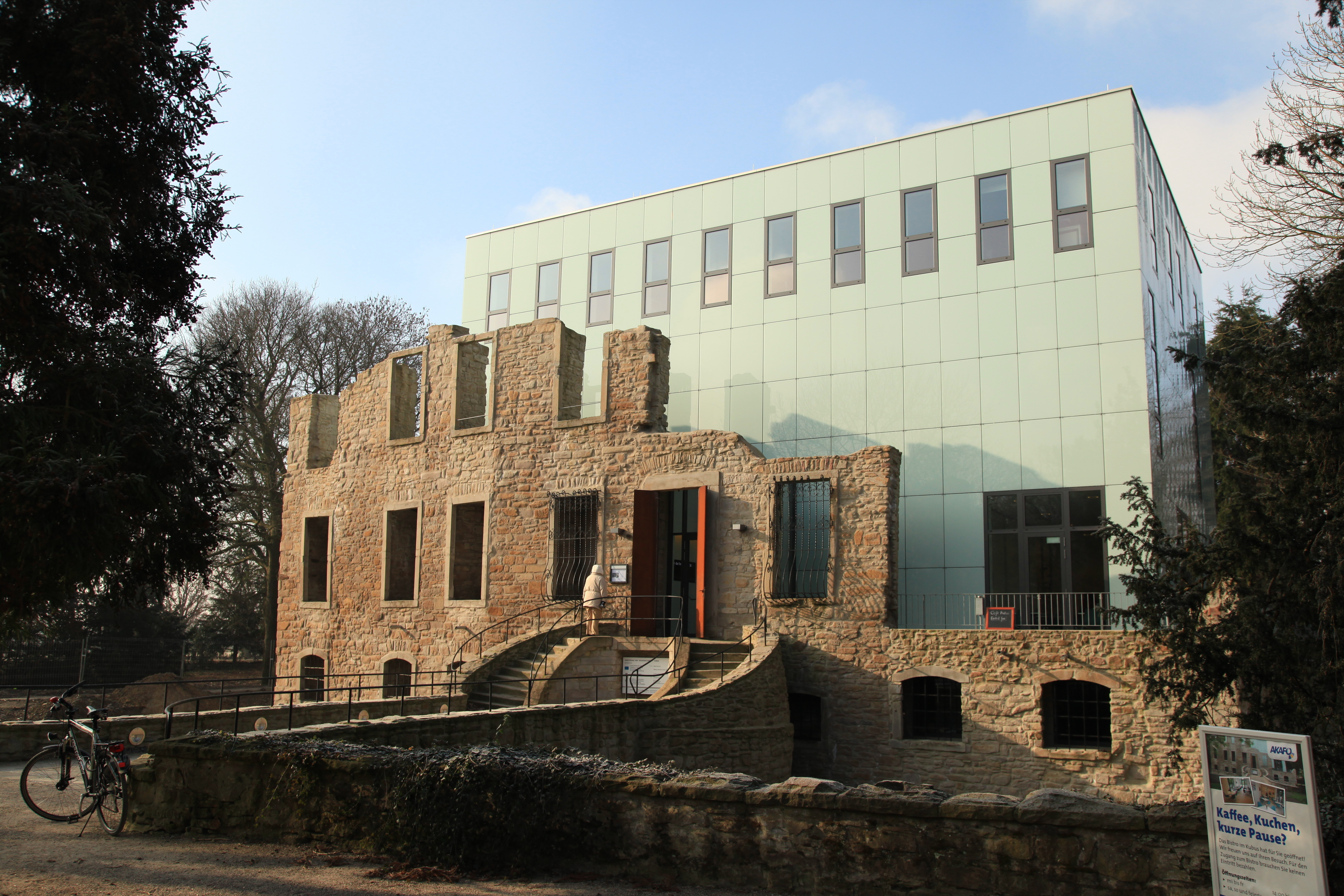
Ruin of the Haus Weitmar with the new Kubus building, view from east

Schematic site plan of the Haus Weitmar in 1892

Haus Weitmar is a former noble residence in the Weitmar district of Bochum. It originated from a Schulzenhof of the Werden Abbey, whose roots can be traced back to the 8th/9th century. Surrounded by a moat in the 12th century, it was expanded into a representative seat in the first half of the 13th century. Extensions in the second half of the 15th century under the von Brüggeney family called Hasenkamp and an expansion in the 18th century resulted in a classicistic-looking manor house with an outer bailey. Northwest of it stood a chapel dedicated to St. Silvester, which, however, lost its function as a home chapel during the Reformation. After the von Hasenkamp family died out, Haus Weitmar was briefly owned by the von Vaerst family before it was purchased by Andreas Friedrich Wilhelm von Berswordt-Wallrabe in 1780. His family is still the owner today.

Haus Weitmar was destroyed by aerial bombing during World War II. The ruins of the manor house with its perron, the remains of the chapel including three headstone, as well as a gatehouse and a gateway from the beginning of the 20th century have been protected as historic monument since 26 April 1995.

== History ==
=== Beginnings ===
Haus Weitmar developed from a farmstead that already existed in Carolingian times. This was proven by ceramic fragments of, among others, Hunneschan's pottery, which were found during an archaeological excavation and could be dated to the 8th/9th century. Around the year 1000, this court was an upper court (curtis) with six dependent lower courts, which Hugbald and his sister Reinwi transferred to the Benedictine Abbey of Werden, together with important rights in the Weitmarer Mark. From then on, the abbey granted the state as a fief and used it as a Schultenhof, which was liable to pay taxes to the monastery. It appears in documents during the 11th and 12th centuries under different name variants: Uuedmeri (c. 1000), Uuetmere (11th century), Wetmare (1153), and Weitmere (c. 1150). Since the 12th century the court was protected by a moat and thus a typical moat for Westphalia. Excavations showed that this moat had been at least two meters deep and more than ten meters wide. Through shards of Pingsdorf and Paffrath earthenware found in it, it could be determined that it must have been filled in during a comprehensive expansion of the upper court in the early 13th century. At that time, a two-room house was built in the area of the former moat, which formed the core of the later complex. Apparently, a ministerialis of Werden Abbey expanded the Schultenhof into a more representative seat, because before 1250, a chapel located northwest of the two-room house was also built on the courtyard area.

The first feudatory of the Haus Weitmar known by name was Johann von Lüttelnau, who resided at Haus Heck, in the late 14th century. During his time Weitmar - as well as the surrounding Bauerschaften Bisping, Klevinghusen, Nevel, Branthorpe and Eppendorf - was plundered in the Dortmund feud of 1388/1389 by 40 swiss mercenaries under their leader Bitter von Raesfeld. Johann's daughter Grete married Johann von Kückelsheim, later Amtmann of Werden and Hattingen, in 1391. As a pledge for the dowry in the amount of 500 gold shields, the bride's father provided him with the Haus Weitmar. Accordingly, the Werden abbot enfeoffed Johann von Kückelsheim with the Schultenhof after the wedding. After his death in 1421, Wilhelm von Uhlenbrock von Haus Oefte followed as feudatory of the house. After him, the Werden abbot enfeoffed Johann and Heinrich von Galen with the estate. The latter ceded it in 1481 to Wennemar von (der) Brüggeney, called Hasenkamp, who was subsequently enfeoffed with it. In addition, he also received as a fief the bureau about wooden law of the Weitmarer Mark and the Bisping court, which also belonged to the Werden Abbey.

=== Gradual expansion ===
Wennemar was a Margravian Amtmann of Bochum and had already received permission in May 1464 to build a new residential house on the grounds of the Schultenhof Weitmar, because his old family seat in Stiepel had become dilapidated. It is possible that an expansion of the two-room house that took place in the second half of the 15th century is connected with Wennemar's move to Weitmar. He was the first feudal lord to occupy the estate himself instead of having it farmed by peasants. During the expansion, an almost square extension was added to the house at its southeast corner, so that it subsequently had an L-shaped floor plan.

In the 16th century the von Hasenkamp family was no longer the sole owner of Weitmar. They had to share it with the von Eickel family. Christine, the daughter of Wennemar's grandson Wessel, had married Heinrich von Eickel, who was enfeoffed with a part of the Haus Weitmar in 1577. In 1644, however, Johann von Hasenkamp was of the opinion that he was entitled to the Eickel part as compensation for debts that had never been settled and chased Dietrich von Eickel's widow and her children out of the house on August 14. However, the final and legally binding transfer of the house did not take place until 2 June 1650, when the widow renounced the Eickel part of the property in exchange for a payment of 300 Reichsthaler for herself and 2125 Dutch thalers for her children. The Eickel part of the property was transferred to Johann von Hasenkamp.

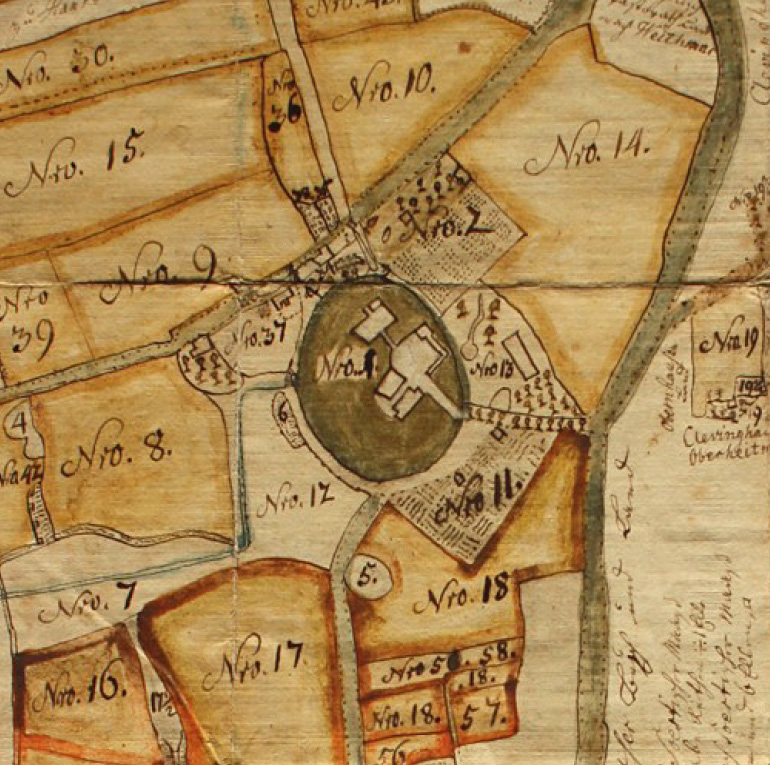
Haus Weitmar on a map from 1780

It was probably not until the 16th century that Haus Weitmar received the status of a knight's seat. After a firebombing by Spanish soldiers in 1588, a new building had already been erected in 1592 by Johann's father of the same name. For a long time, this was considered by researchers to be a new manor house, but this was refuted by excavations in 2009, which allowed the construction phases of the main house to be dated to other times. It is more likely that a second manor house was built as a result of the division of the fiefdom between the von Hasenkamp and von Eickel families. On a map from the year 1780, a building can be seen in the outer castle area, which was only slightly smaller than the actual main house. This could have been the new building from 1592. In 1823, however, it had already been demolished, because on the original Westphalian map from that year it was already marked as demolished. The building is still visible on the map.

The Hasenkamp family remained the owner of the estate until the 18th century. Already during his lifetime, the cathedral scholaster Johann Georg von Hasenkamp transferred the Weitmar house to his nephew Johann Werner in 1707. Thus, for the first time in seven generations, the property was not inherited from father to son. In 1748, the family built a new Catholic house chapel, as the old Sylvester chapel had been used by a Lutheran congregation since the Reformation. However, the family was doing badly financially. In 1756, a forced sale of some properties belonging to the house. In 1762, insolvency was even opened over the assets of the owner of Haus Weitmar. With the death of the unmarried Johann von Hasenkamp, the family died out in 1764, and the rights to Haus Weitmar were to be sold. An appraisal of the property in June 1764 resulted in a value of 8200 Reichsthaler, but this was already far exceeded at the second sale on 2 November 1764, with a bid of 13,000 Reichsthaler.

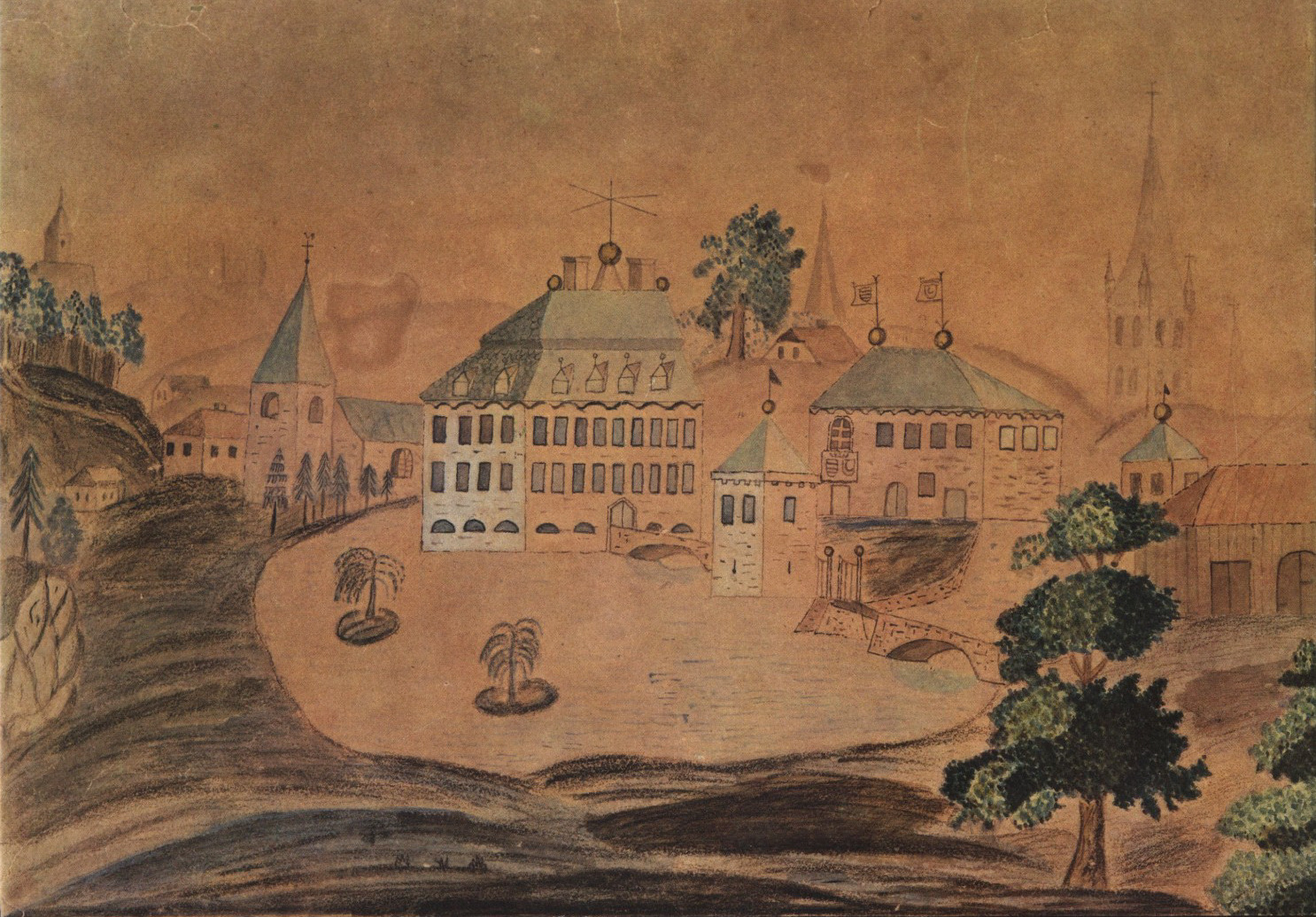
Haus Weitmar in 1821

In 1774 Friedrich Goswin von Vaerst acquired the estate in a public probate process. He released the house from the feudal relationship with Werden and became the owner of the estate. He did not remain so for long, however, but sold it again as early as 1780 to Andreas Friedrich Wilhelm von Berswordt-Wallrabe, whose family is still the owner today and has taken up quarters in the neighboring Galerie m. They had changes made to the manor house once again in the late 18th century. The space located in the northeast at the angle of the core and extension was closed. This involved either a major overhaul or completely new brickwork on the facades to give them a uniform classicist appearance. In addition, the house received a multi-storey mansard roof. The facades and roof form were the reasons why later art historians often mistakenly classified Haus Weitmar as a purely classicist building. Also in the 18th century, the estate's pond-like moat, created in the 16th century at the latest, was drained and replaced by gardens. A large market garden still existed to the north of the house until the 1930s.

=== 19th - 21st century ===
Wilhelm Friedrich von Berswordt-Wallrabe married Philippine von Syberg in 1848. Through this union, Haus Kemnade also came into the possession of the family. At the end of the 19th century, the owners had almost all the gardens transformed into a landscape park. On the island in front of the castle, a stable and residential building was built at the same time, incorporating older structures such as the house chapel, which also had a gate-like character. In the design of the landscape garden, the central axis of the estate was retained as the dominant element. It is formed, among other things, by a long access avenue, at the starting point of which in the east a gatehouse was built at the beginning of the 20th century. In 1890, Ludwig von Berswordt-Wallrabe reacquired the Sylvester chapel, which had meanwhile fallen into disrepair, together with the associated land for 1000 marks for the Haus Weitmar. The chapel was built on the site of the Sylvester chapel. The small house of worship had been so dilapidated that the Protestant congregation had already decided to build a new church elsewhere in the 1860s and thus no longer had any use for the chapel.

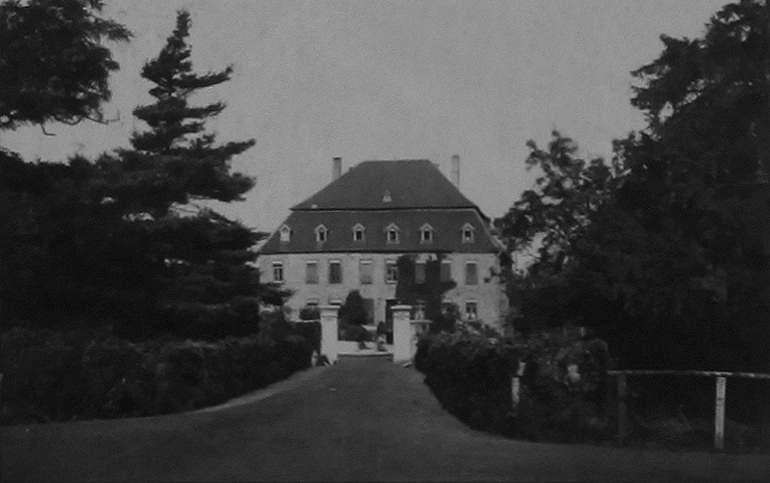
Haus Weitmar before its destruction in 1943

During World War II, Haus Weitmar was hit by bombs during an air raid on 13 May 1943, and burned down to the outer walls. The library of the house, which contained many thousands of volumes, was also lost. The outer castle building from the late 19th century remained intact, but was demolished and completely leveled in 1968. In the same year, Alexander von Berswordt-Wallrabe founded Galerie m Bochum in the adjacent area of the castle. The ruins of the manor house and chapel were saved from final decay in the 1970s thanks to the initiative of the Kunstverein Bochum. In 1974, the city of Bochum leased the park, which had meanwhile become overgrown, and restored it by 1978, subsequently opening it to the public. The opening of the park to the general public and the simultaneous opening of Galerie m were accompanied by the placement of contemporary sculptures in the park. When the lease expired in 2000, conservation measures were necessary on the ruins because tree roots were endangering the masonry. The cost of restoration was estimated at 290,000 euros, but neither the city nor the owner wanted to pay. In September 2005, the remains of both structures had to be closed off with construction fences because falling chunks of stone were endangering visitors.

The planned construction of an event and exhibition building in the area of the former manor house required a previously conducted excavation on the site in order to document the building substance that was still preserved underground at the time. The main excavation began in April 2009 and lasted only 24 days. In the process, the barrel vault in the cellar was demolished and all fixtures from the 18th to 20th centuries were removed. Originally, it was planned to preserve the cellar vault. Due to the findings made during the excavation, the history of the Schultenhof that had been handed down until then could be corrected in some places. Another excavation took place from July 2014 in the area of the former outer castle, because the "Museum Underground" was to be built on its area. In the process, the foundations of the eastern building and a gatehouse were uncovered.

=== Current use ===
Under a new lease agreement concluded by the city of Bochum with the family that owns Weitmar Park, the care and maintenance of the park and its listed ruins will remain in municipal hands until 2026.

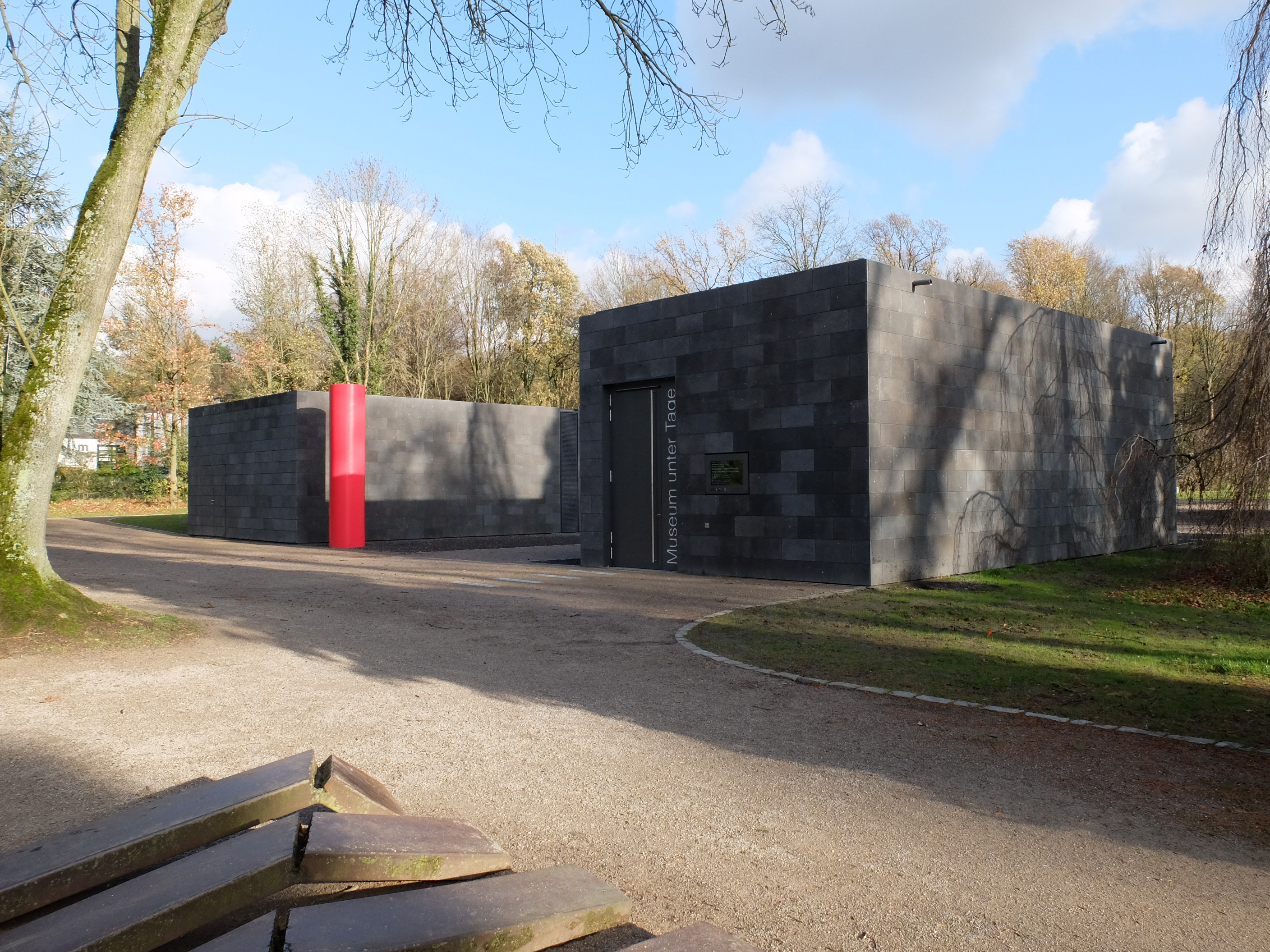
Museum unter Tage

On the initiative of Alexander von Berswordt-Wallrabe, Situation Kunst (for Max Imdahl), a contemporary art collection with sculptures and paintings, was created in the park of Haus Weitmar starting in the late 1980s, which he donated to the art collection of the Ruhr University Bochum in 1990. The collection was created in memory of the art historian Max Imdahl, who became the first holder of the Chair of Art History at Bochum University in 1965. A building was completed for Situation Kunst in May 2010 as part of the Ruhr.2010, providing around 1,200 square meters of space for cultural and scientific events, exhibitions, and storage and workrooms. The building, called Kubus, was built according to designs by the architects Pfeiffer, Ellermann and Preckel from Münster and built into the Weitmar manor house ruins. In the course of its completion, the estate's old moat was refilled with water. On 13 November 2015 an underground extension of the Situation Kunst opened with the Museum unter Tage (MuT).

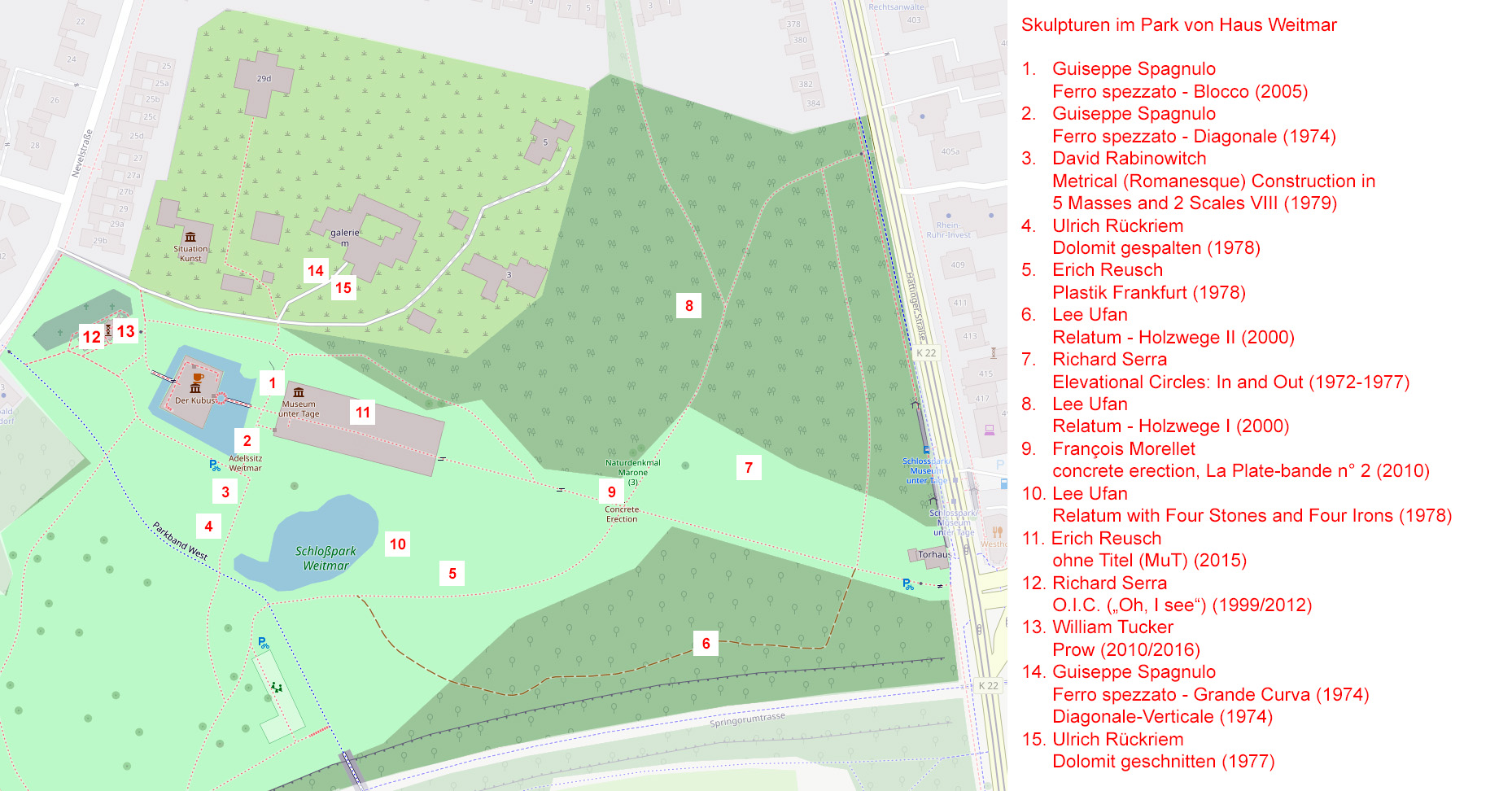
Sculptures in the Schlosspark

The park itself also serves as an art space. Works of concrete art can be seen at various locations. The artists represented, who are very well known in the art scene, are François Morellet, David Rabinowitch, Erich Reusch, Ulrich Rückriem, Richard Serra, Giuseppe Spagnulo, William Tucker and Lee Ufan.

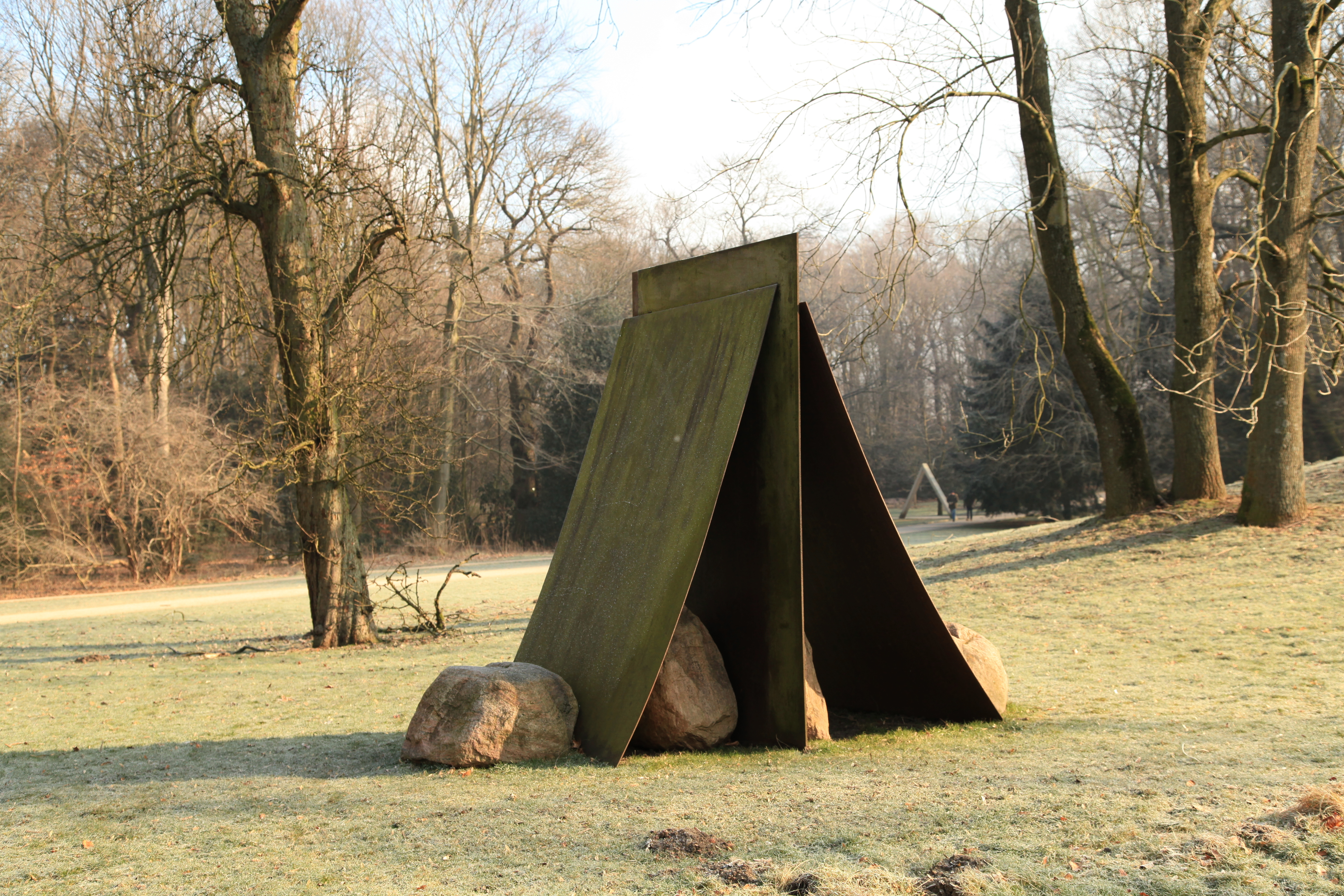
Lee Ufan: Relatum with Four Stones and Four Irons

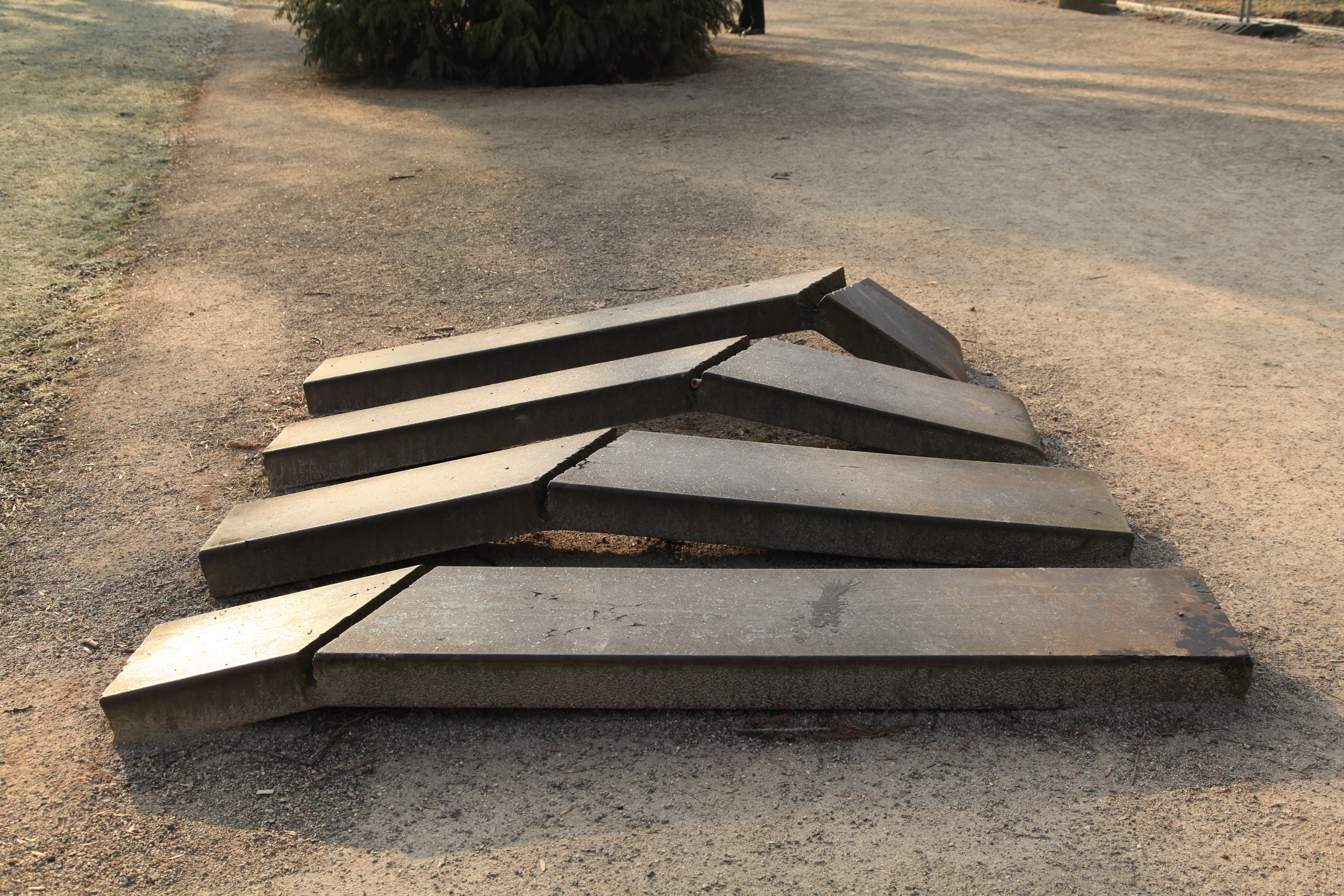
Giuseppe Spagnulo: Ferro spezzato - Diagonale

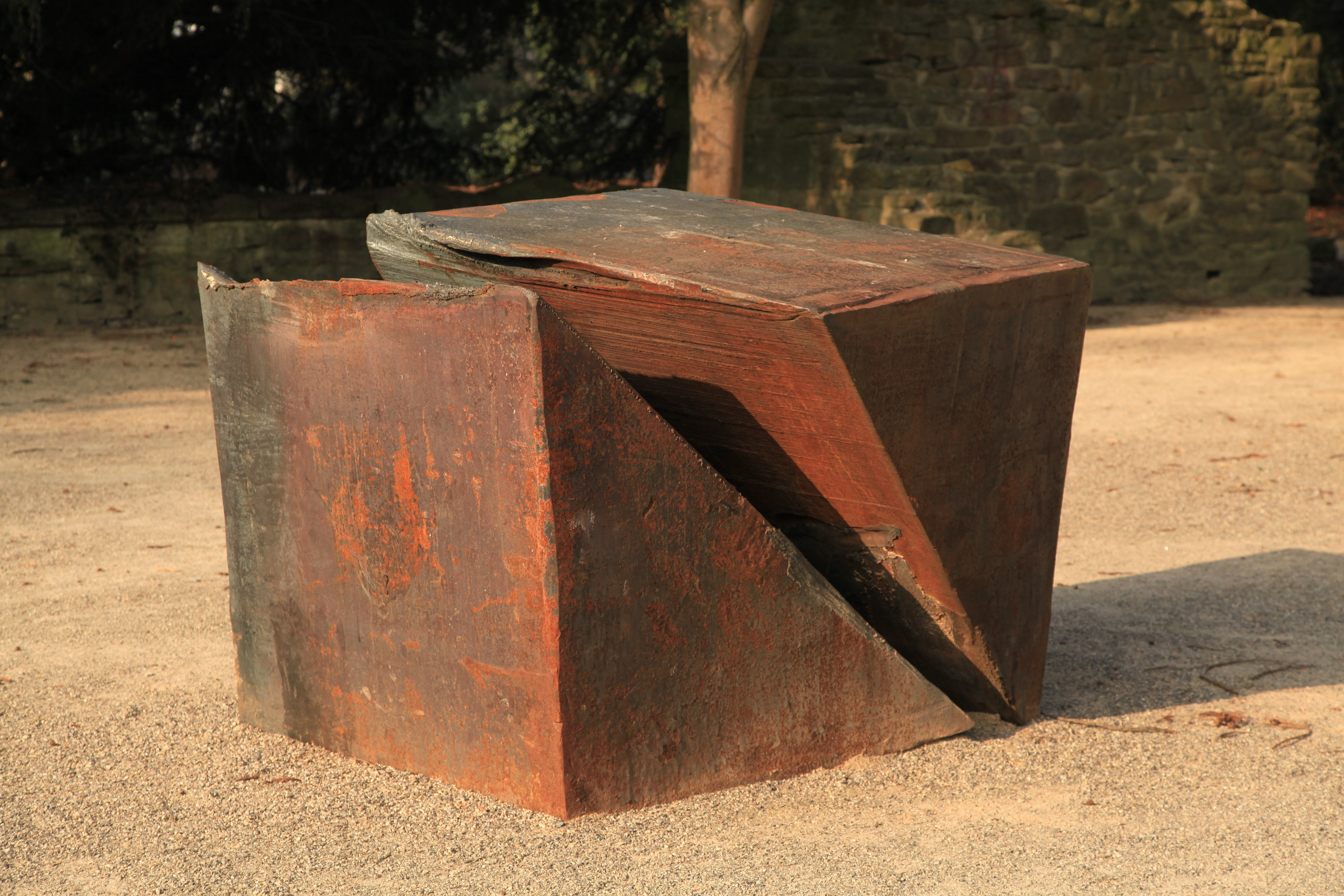
Giuseppe Spagnulo: Ferro spezzato - Blocco

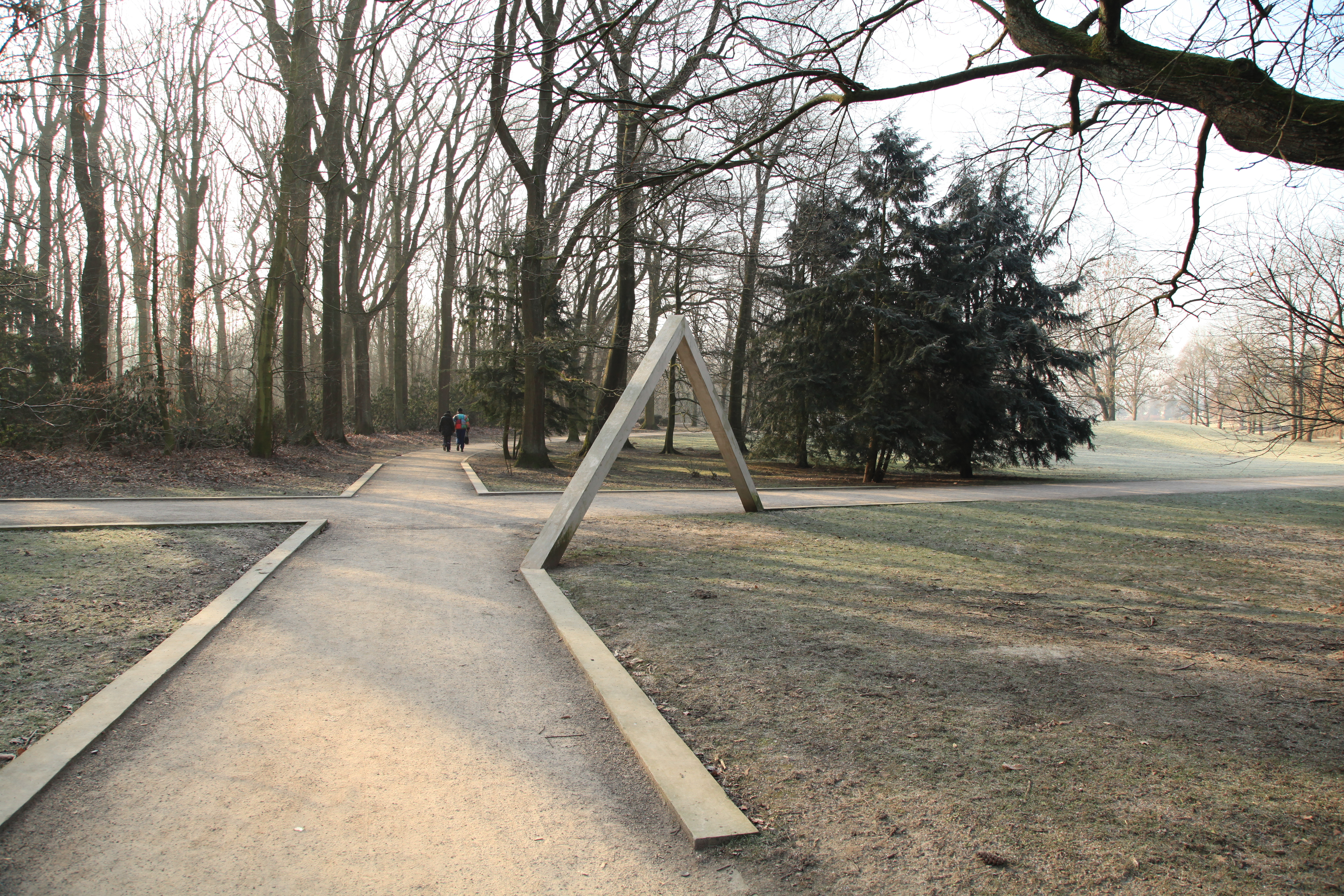
François Morellet: concrete erection, La Plate-bande n° 2

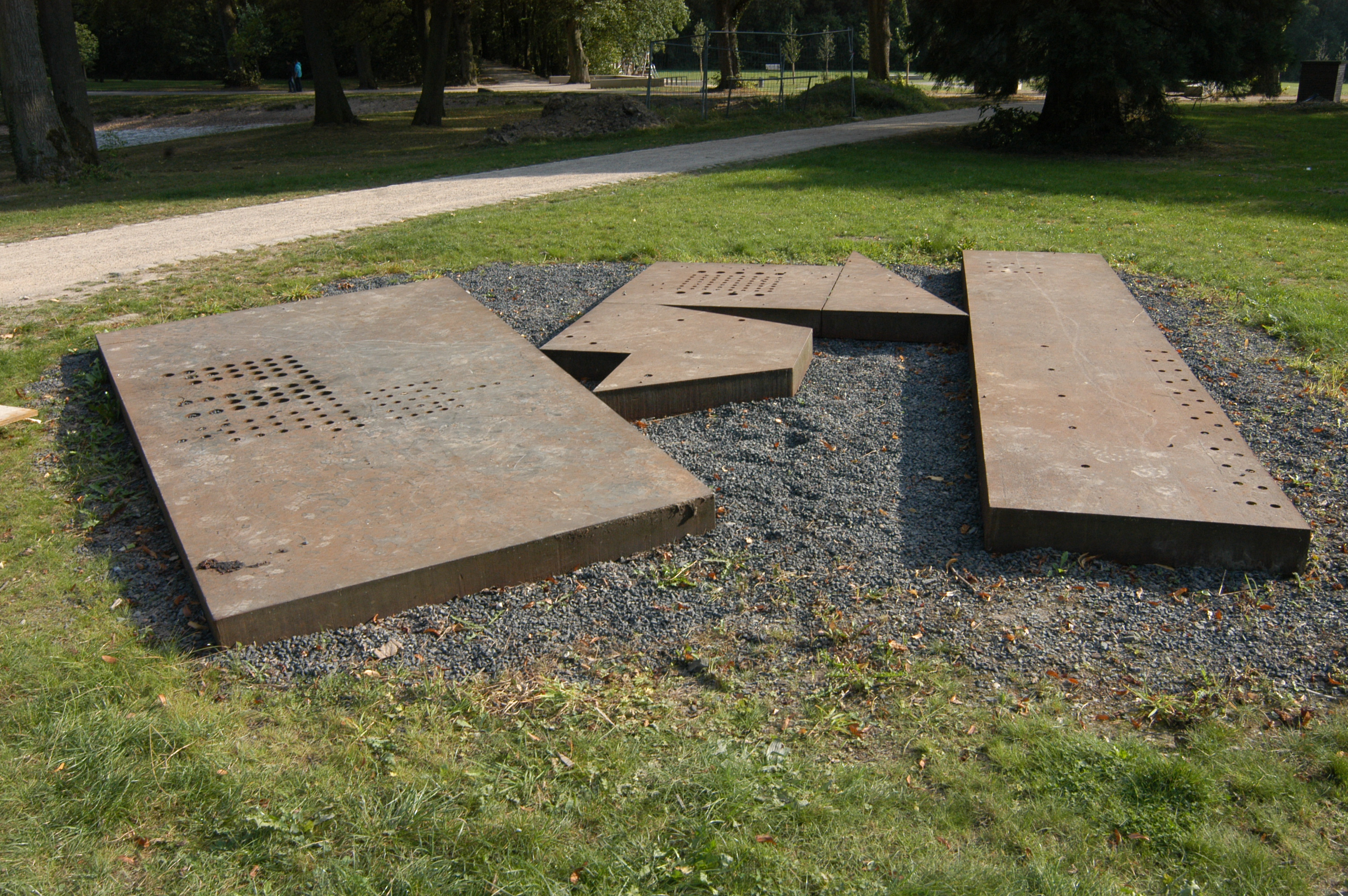
David Rabinowitch: Metrical (Romanesque) Construction in 5 Masses and 2 Scales VIII

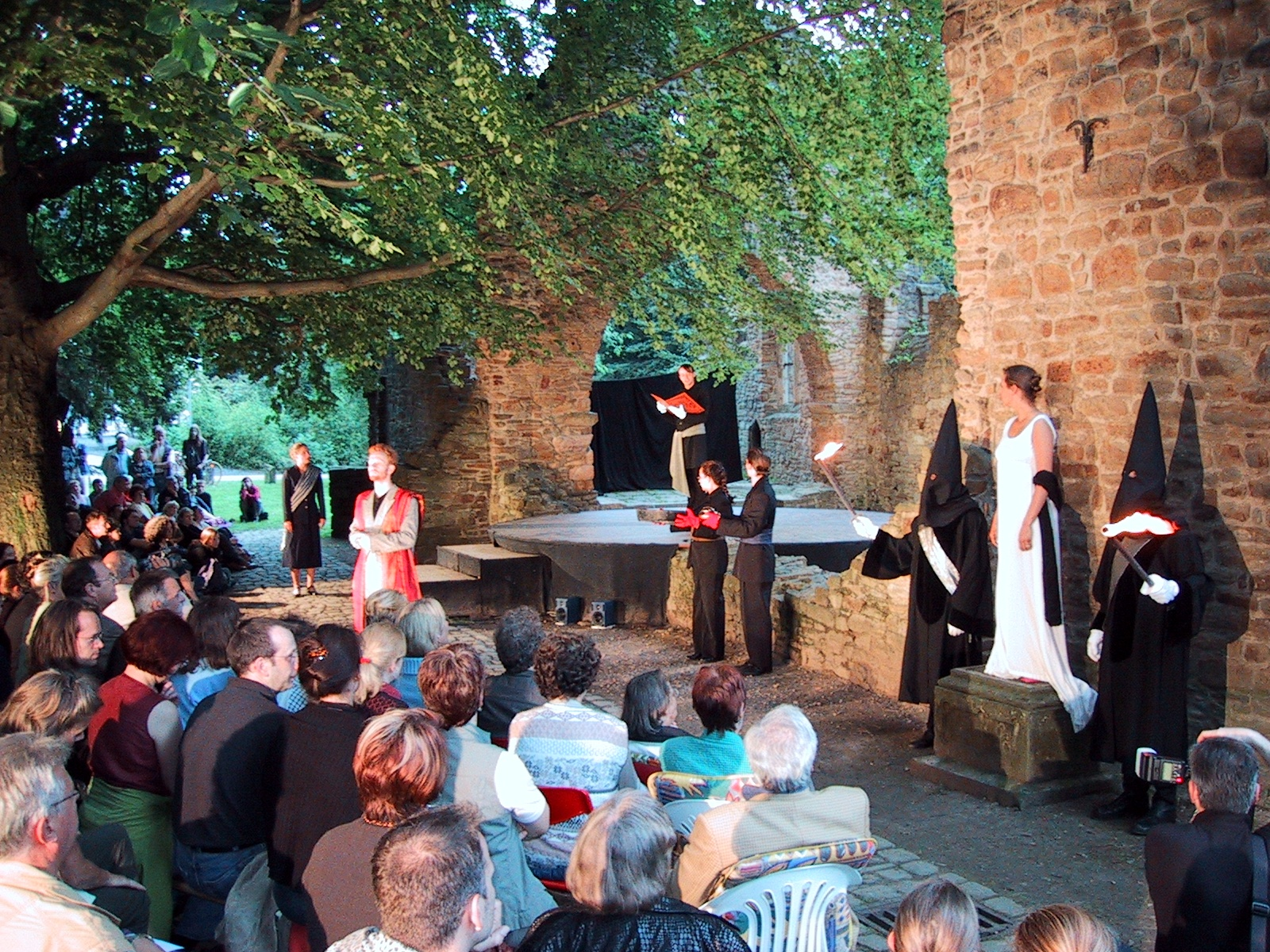
Performance of the drama students, 2001

In the past, every summer from the 1990s to 2010, students from the Schauspielschule Bochum performed in the park. Traditionally, a play or scenes from Shakespeare were shown. The admission-free performances of this open-air theater were very well attended by the Bochum audience. In 2022, after years of hiatus, a play was performed again.

== Description ==
=== Manor house and outer bailey ===
The manor house and outer bailey used to stand on two separate islands in the middle of a pond (moat) fed by the Linnebecke river. A long bridge led to the outer island with stables and storage buildings. There was also a chapel from 1748, which was later profaned and used as a stable. Above its entrance were the coats of arms of the von Hasenkamp and von Eerde families.

A single-arched bridge made of rubble masonry, which is still preserved today, led from the outer castle island across the moat to the simple, two-story manor house. The building was constructed in three phases. Probably in the first half of the 13th century, a two-room house measuring 27 × 12 meters was erected, the foundations of which were two meters thick. Its above-ground, double-shell walls of Ruhr sandstone were up to 1.40 meters thick and comprised at least two to three stories. This building was extended in the second half of the 15th century at the southeast corner by a 9 × 10 meter annex. At the end of the 18th century, the von Berswordt-Wallrabe family had this L-shaped building expanded into an almost transverse rectangular house with a multi-story mansard roof. In this third construction phase, it also received a barrel-vaulted cellar with stich-arched windows. Its slightly buckled façade on the east side probably resulted from the unstable building ground in the area of the former moat, which was drained at the time.

Today, only the two-story outer walls of the south and east sides of the former manor house remain. Their rectangular door and window openings have sandstone surrounds. Traces of older elements can still be seen on the masonry, such as garderobe and cross-windows. A double-flight, curved flight of steps leads to the main entrance.

Building development of the Haus Weitmar

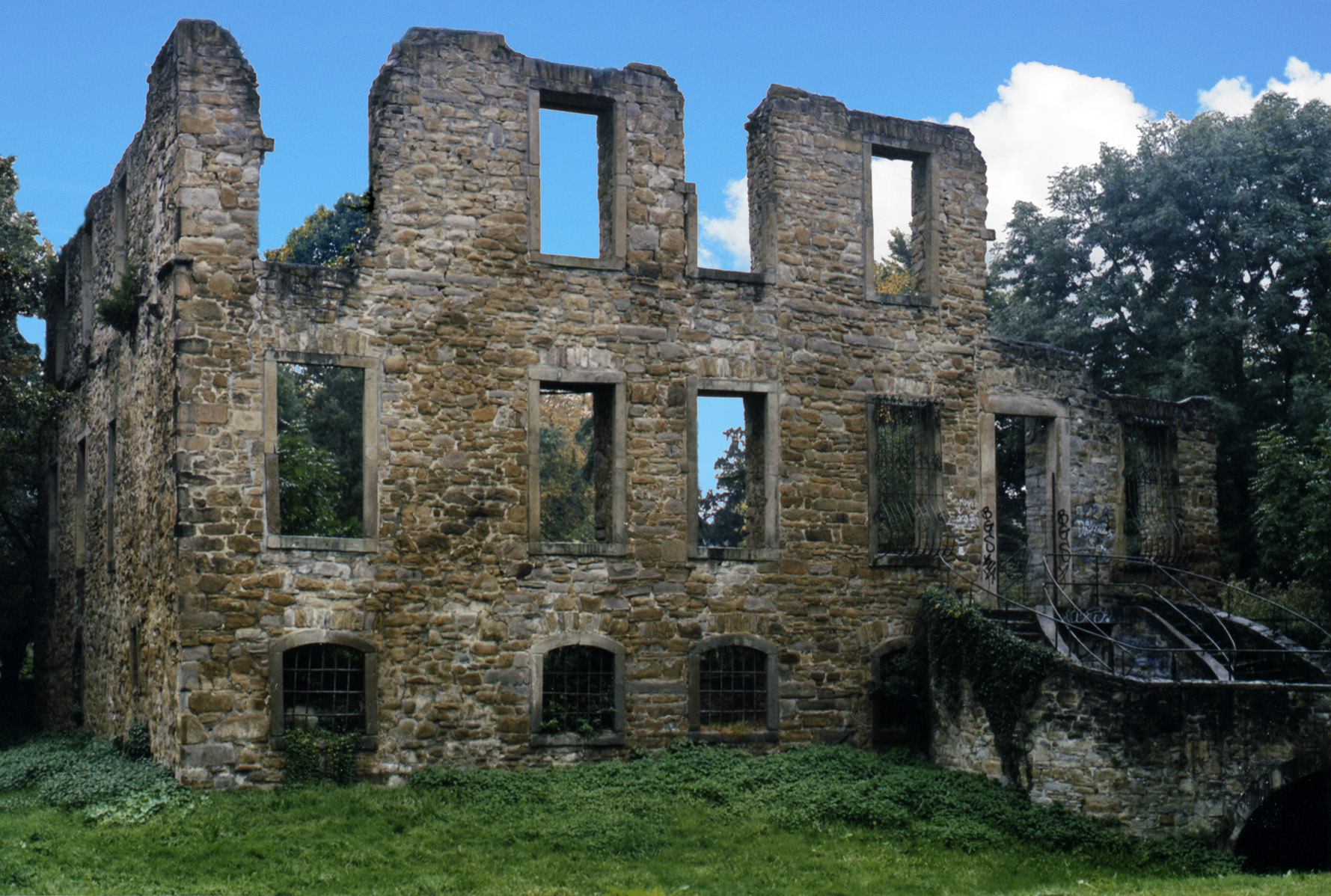
The manor house ruins before the construction of the Kubus

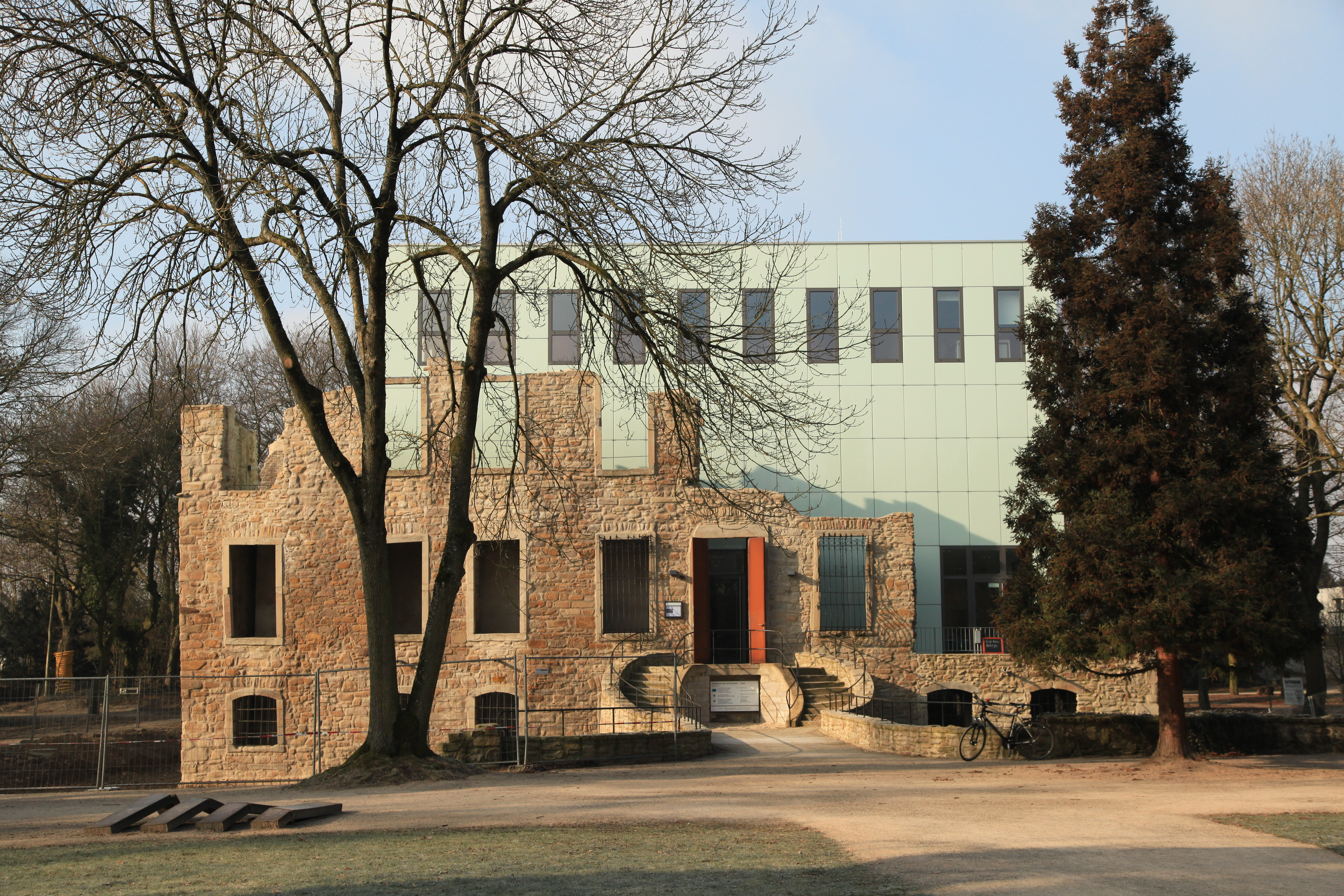
Manor house ruin with Kubus from southeast

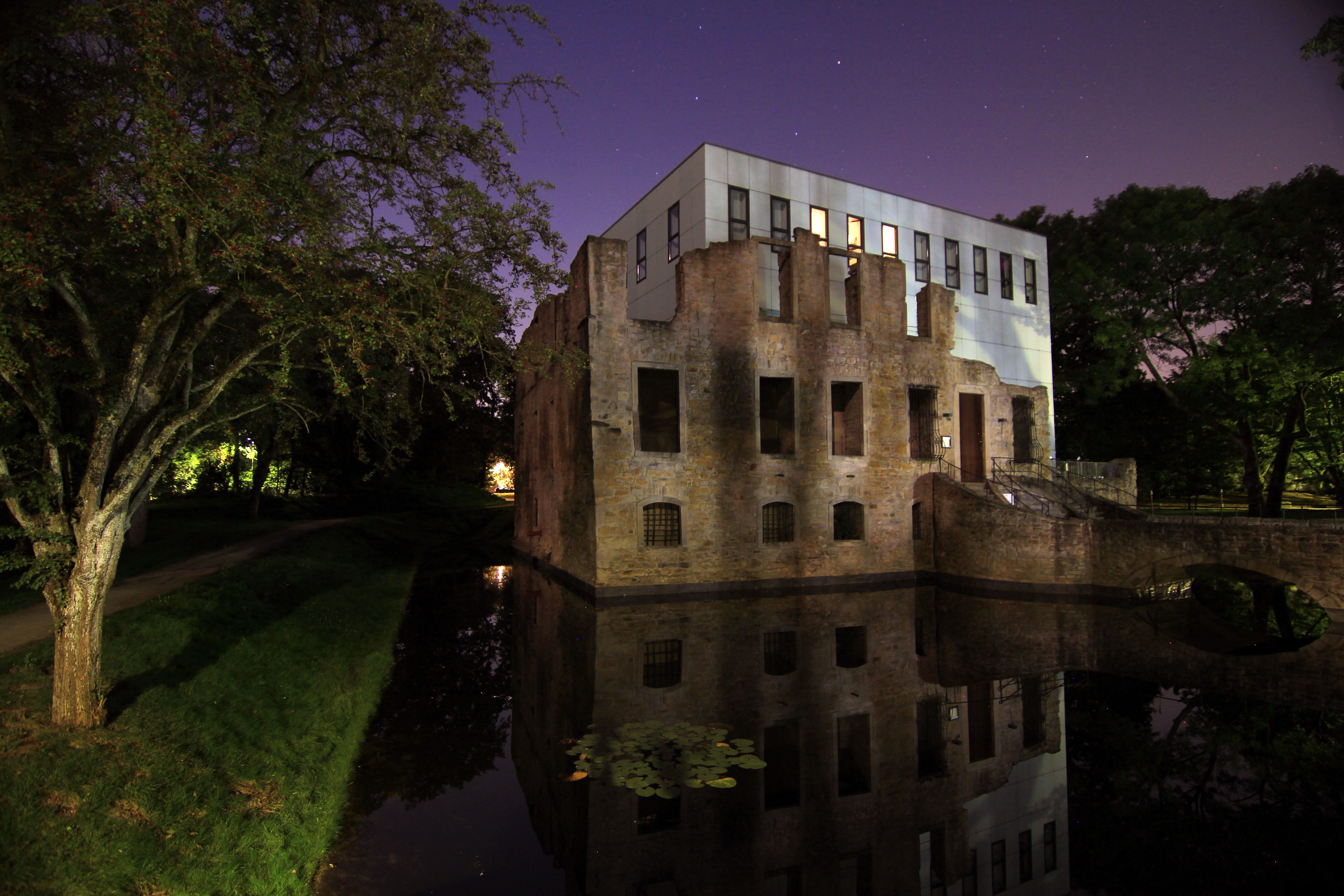
Manor house ruin with Kubus at night

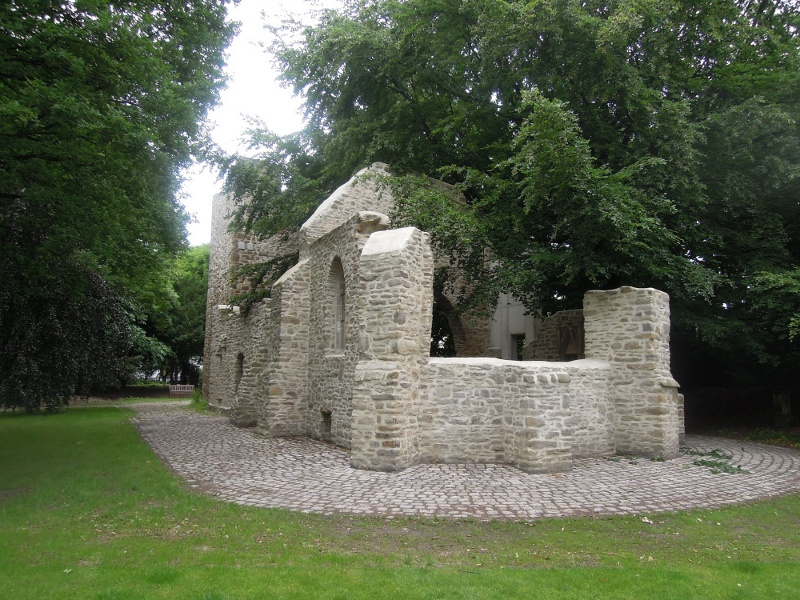
Ruin of the Sylvester chapel in the park

=== Sylvester chapel ===
The Sylvester chapel, first mentioned in a document in 1397, stands northwest of the manor house and has predominantly Gothic elements. The small cemetery next to the chapel testifies to the fact that the place of worship was the church of the Protestant parish for centuries. Parts of its square west tower still show Romanesque forms. The tower has a round-arched portal with an oeil-de-boeuf above it. On the upper floor, the lower parts of formerly round-arched windows are still preserved. A round-arched passage leads into the nave, under which there is an inaccessible crypt. According to the report of a Weitmar priest, members of the owner families of Haus Weitmar and Haus Bärendorf are said to have been buried there in former times. The southern wall of the nave is still preserved up to the height of the window sills, but the northern wall is only present in the base area. On the east side, a pointed arch opening leads into the late Gothic choir, which is three steps higher than the nave. The square section has a 3/8 closure and openings for lancet windows. The corbels for the former choir vault are still preserved. On the north side, there is a late Gothic Church tabernacle with crowning wimperg. Opposite this is a triangular lavabo.

There are three grave slabs in the ruin. They come from the vicinity of the chapel and were placed there in the 1970s. On them are the years of death 1625, 1705 and 1765.

=== Schlosspark ===
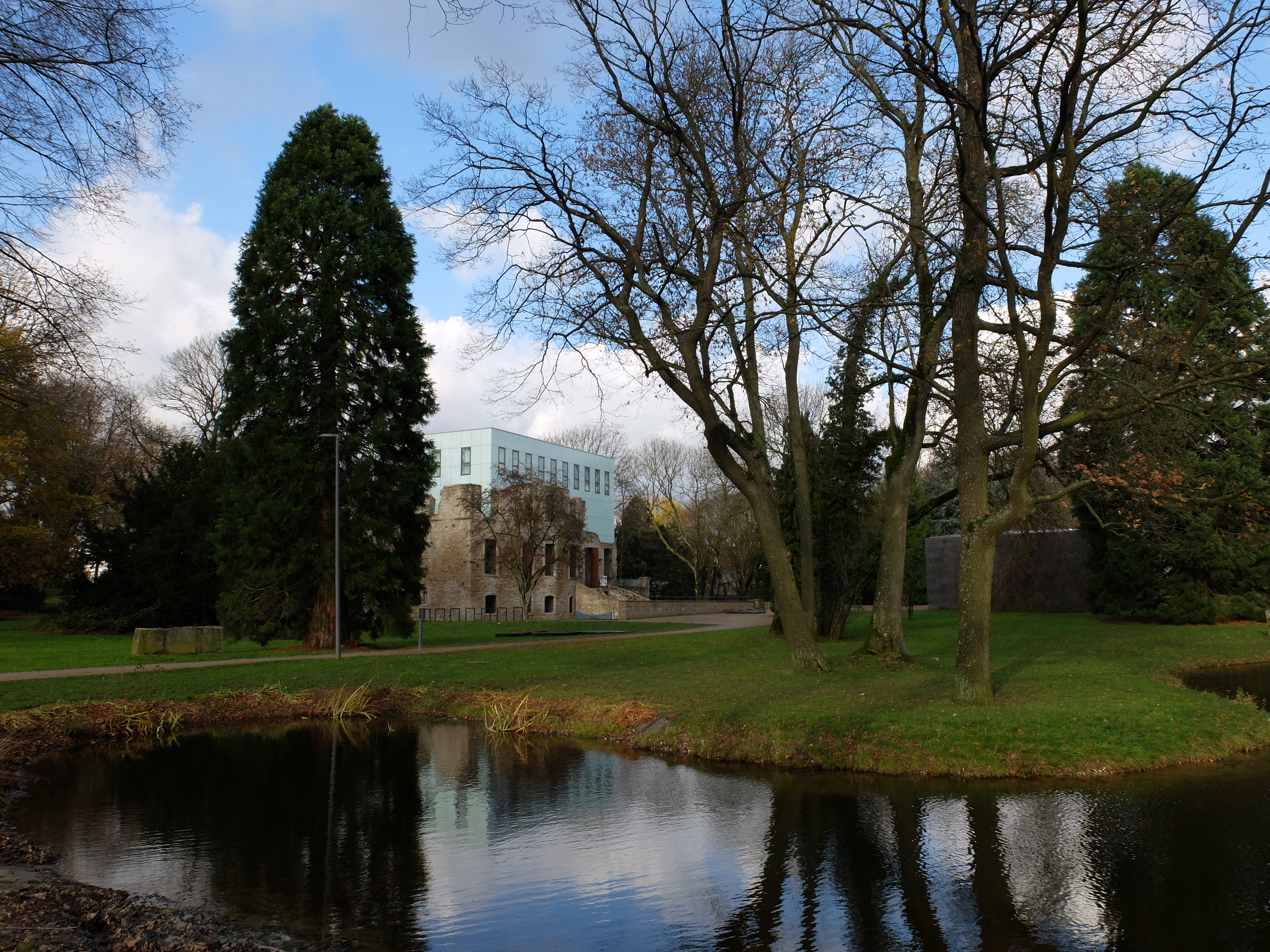
Schlosspark

Haus Weitmar is surrounded by a 7.8-hectare park called Schlosspark, which was last repaired in 2010. The landscape park consists of larger lawns with specimen trees, a pond and an oak-beech forest surrounding the lawns. Its dominant design element is the long driveway approaching the manor house from the east. At its starting point on Hattinger Street stands a gatehouse with a mansard roof and corner turrets from the beginning of the 20th century. Directly next to it is a gate complex whose large two-winged main gate has two octagonal gate pillars made of sandstone with crowning lanterns. The pillars show coats of arms with boars and fleur-de-lis as a sign of the Berswordt and Wallrabe families. The lattice gate is made of wrought iron and consists of elements in the form of arches, foliage and lambent spikes. To the right and left of the main gate there are two smaller side gates, whose square pillars are terminated by spherical formations.

In the park of Haus Weitmar there are numerous trees, some of them centuries old. Ornamental shrubs fill gaps left by dying and over-aged vegetation. Among the most valuable plants in the park are sweet chestnuts with trunk girths of up to four meters, common beeches with girths of up to three meters, and yews that are rare in Germany, as well as oaks with similarly large trunk girths. A curiosity is a red beech with a twisting growth. Until the year 2000, the oldest tree in Bochum, a dwarf beech planted in 1740, also stood there until it broke apart due to arson. The tree died in the following years.

Also worth mentioning is a group of glacial erratic blocks consisting of different types of rock. Among others, granite, gneiss, gabbro and porphyry can be found. The large stones were collected by former owners of the Weitmar house.

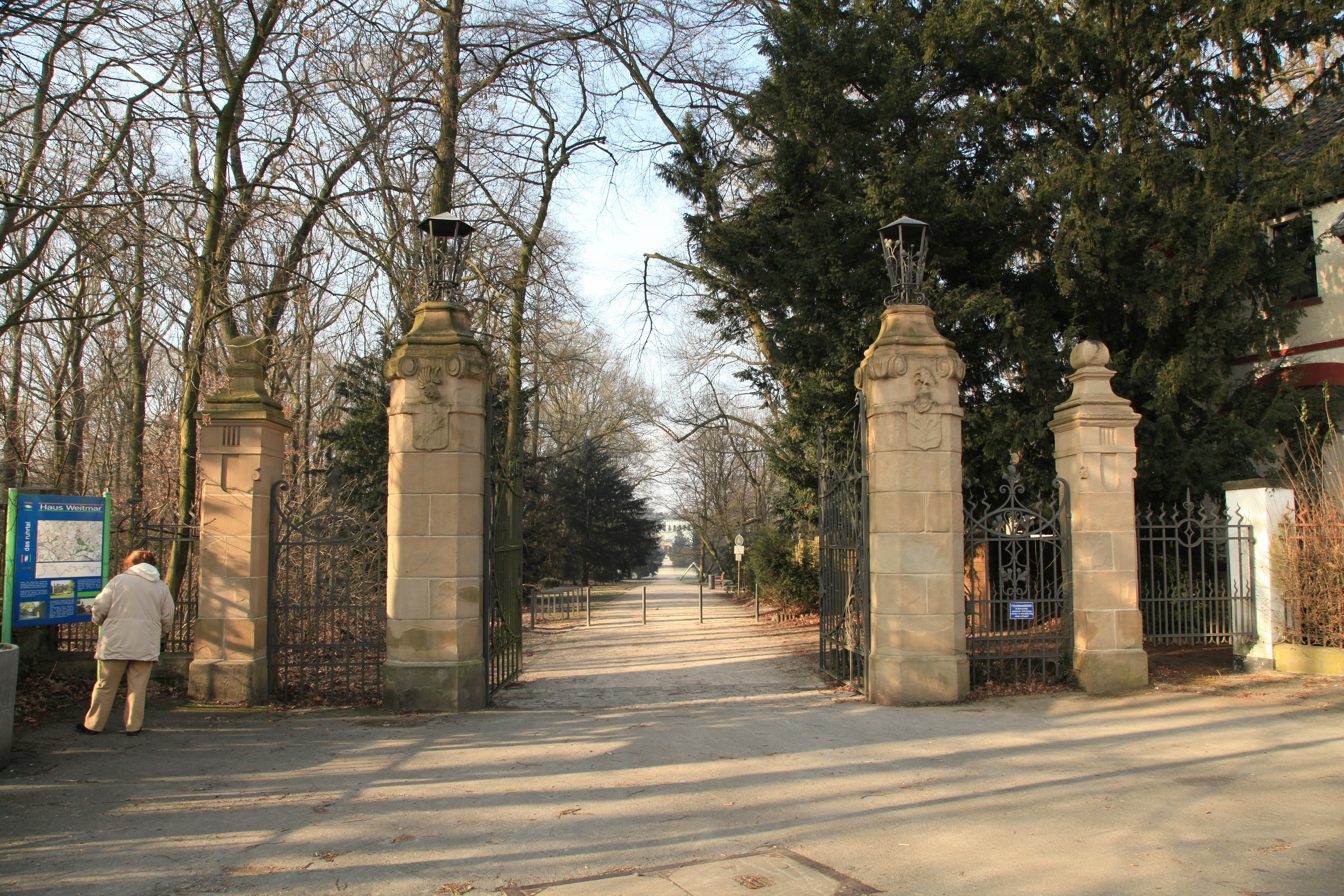
Door system

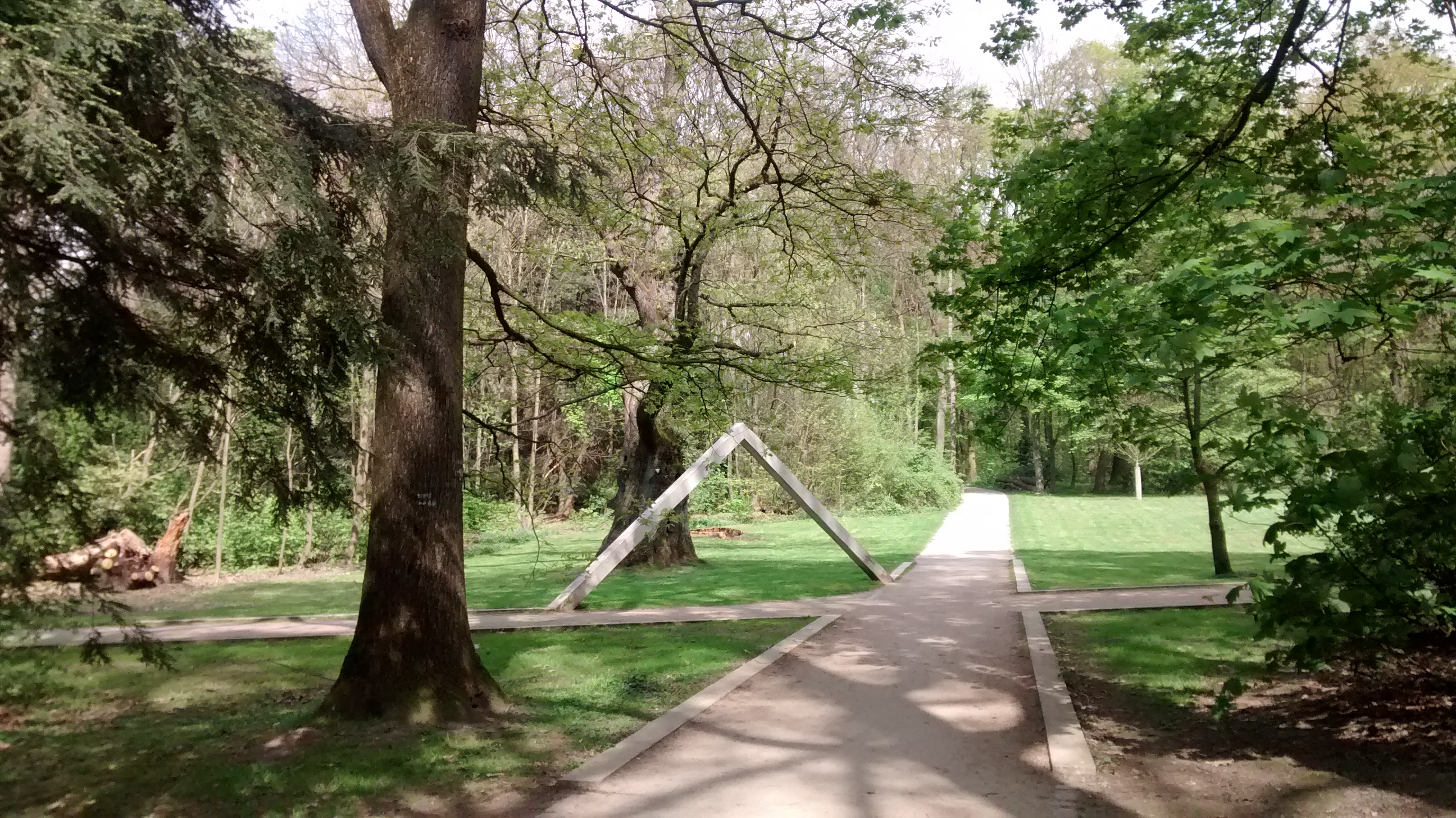
Partie in the Schlosspark

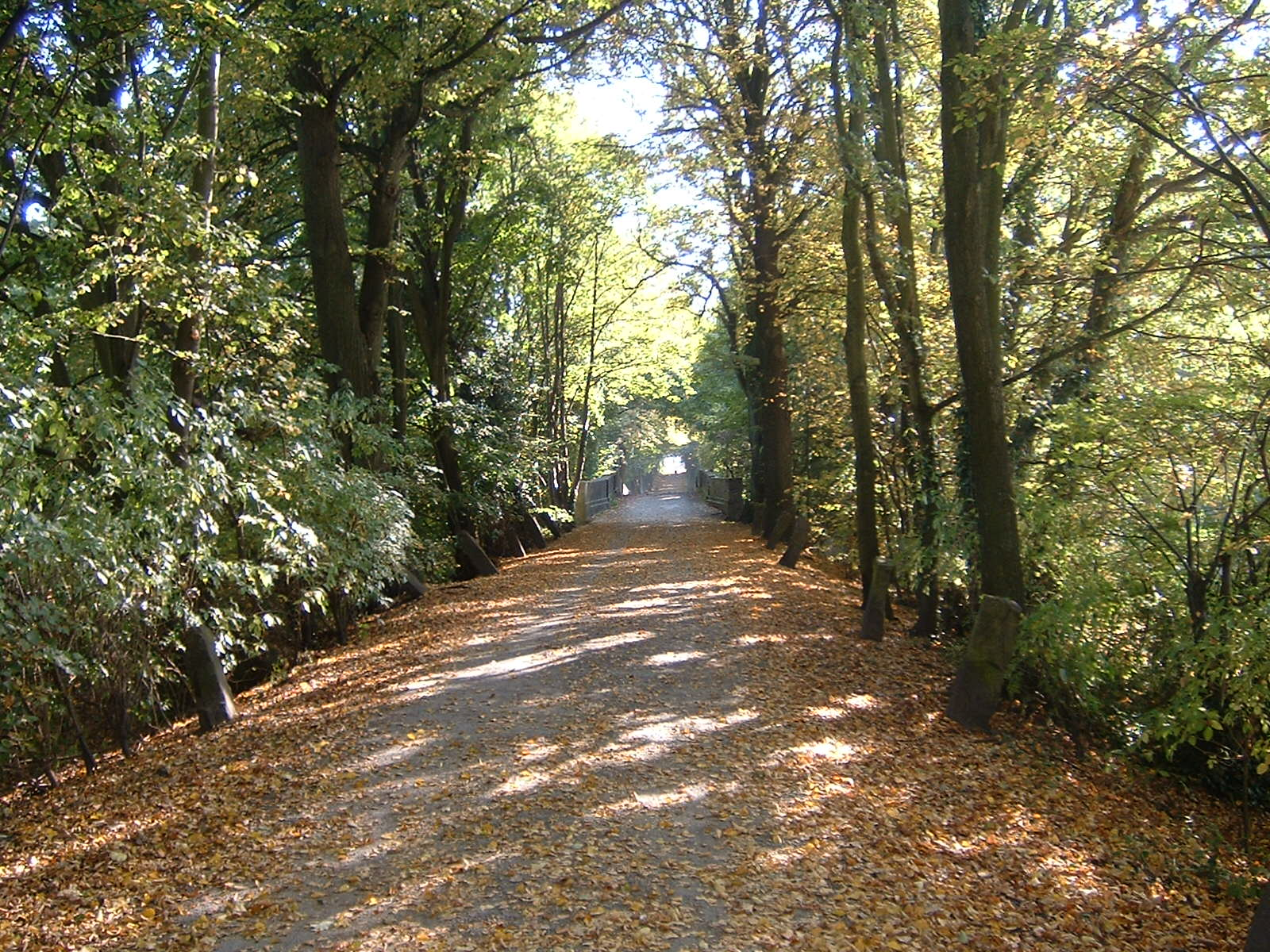
Allee in Schlosspark

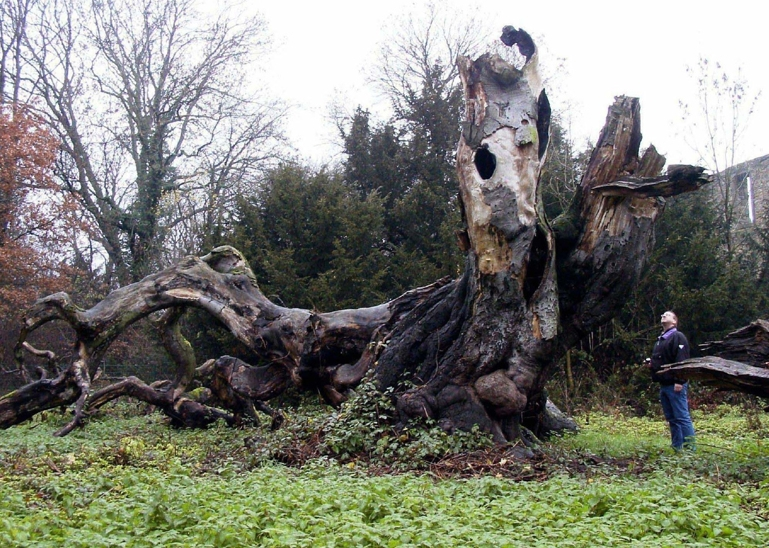
The dwarf beech, once the oldest tree in Bochum

== Bibliography ==
- Willi Berneiser: Haus Weitmar. In: Vereinigung für Heimatkunde Bochum (Hrsg.): Bochum. Heimatbuch. Band 7. Schürmann & Klagges, Bochum 1958, pp. 93–97 (online).
- Georg Eggenstein, Wolfram Essling-Wintzer: Tief im Westen – neue Grabungen am Haus Weitmar in Bochum. In: LWL-Archäologie in Westfalen, Altertumskommission für Westfalen (Hrsg.): Archäologie in Westfalen-Lippe 2014. Beier & Beran, Langenweißbach 2015, ISBN 978-3-95741-040-5, pp. 166–169 (PDF; 3,3 MB).
- Klaus Gorzny: Burgen, Schlösser und Adelssitze entlang der Ruhr. Ein Wegbegleiter. Piccolo, Marl 2002, ISBN 3-9801776-7-X, pp. 113–115.
- Albert Ludorff: Die Bau- und Kunstdenkmäler des Kreises Bochum-Land (= Die Bau- und Kunstdenkmäler von Westfalen. Band 23). Schöningh, Münster 1907, pp. 49–50 (Digitalisat).
- Stefan Pätzold: Haus Weitmar. In: Kai Niederhöfer (Red.): Burgen AufRuhr. Unterwegs zu 100 Burgen, Schlössern und Herrensitzen in der Ruhrregion. Klartext, Essen 2010, ISBN 978-3-8375-0234-3, pp. 27–31.
- Eduard Schulte: Geschichtsbilder der Rittersitze Crange im Emscherbruch und Weitmar bei Bochum. Heitkamp, Bochum 1977.
- Wolfram Wintzer, Cornelia Kneppe: Ein bewegtes Schicksal: zur Geschichte von Haus Weitmar in Bochum. In: LWL-Archäologie in Westfalen, Altertumskommission für Westfalen (Hrsg.): Archäologie in Westfalen-Lippe 2009. Beier & Beran, Langenweißbach 2010, ISBN 978-3-941171-42-8, pp. 98–101 (PDF; 715 kB).
