= Naika Foroutan =

German university teacher (born 1971)

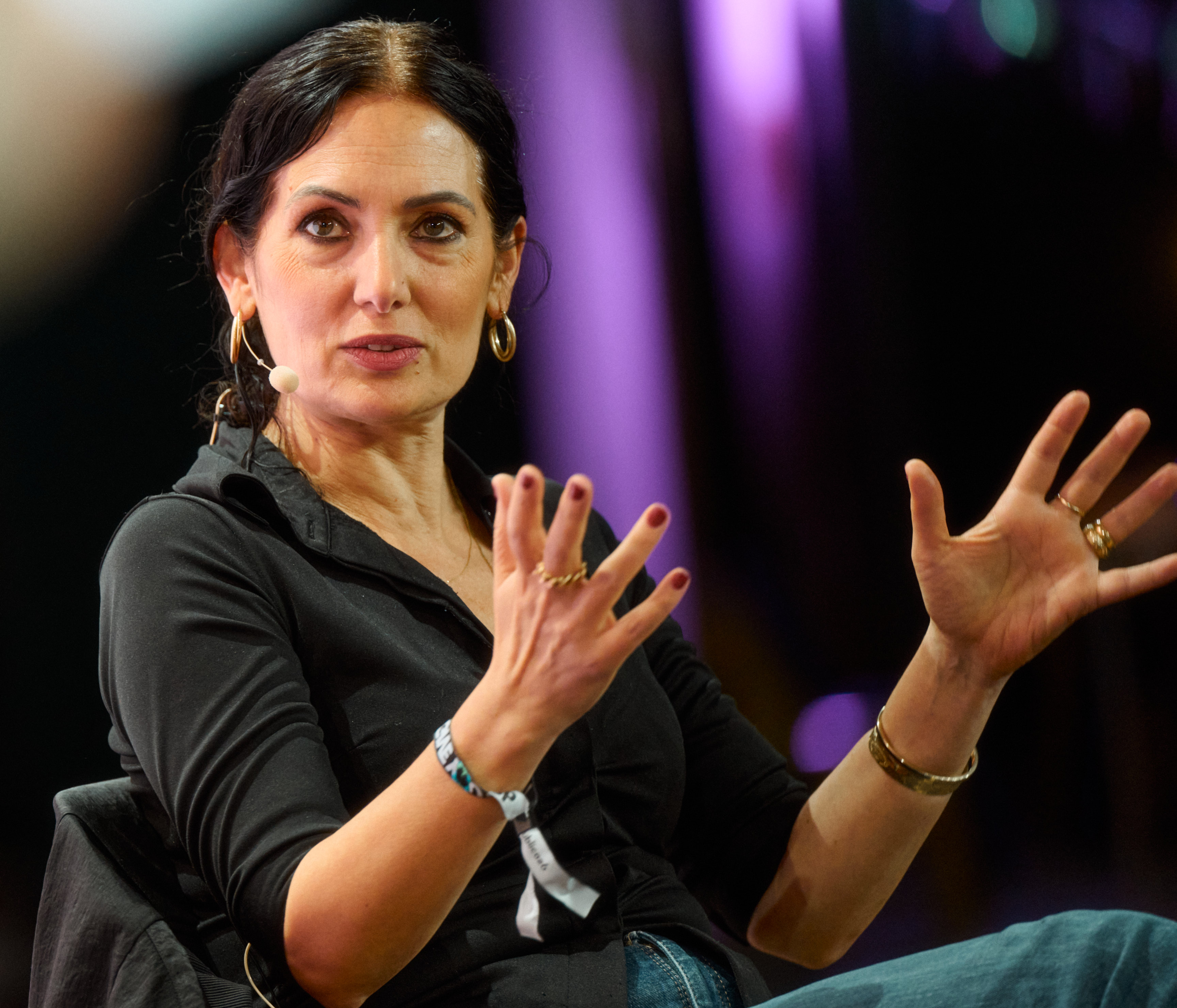
Foroutan in 2026

Naika Foroutan (Persian: نایکا فروتن; born 24 December 1971 in Boppard) is an Iranian-German social scientist.

She has been head of the research group Young Islam-related Topics in Germany (JUNITED) at the Humboldt-Universität Berlin (HU) since 2011; in June 2015, she was appointed professor of integration research and social policy by the Humboldt-Universität. In addition, she is secretary of the five-member board of the German Council for Migration; since 2017 she has also been head of the German Centre for Integration and Migration Research (DeZIM).

Since May 2018, Foroutan has been the director of the Berlin Institute for Empirical Integration and Migration Research (BIM) and has led the Integration Research and Social Policy department.

== Life ==
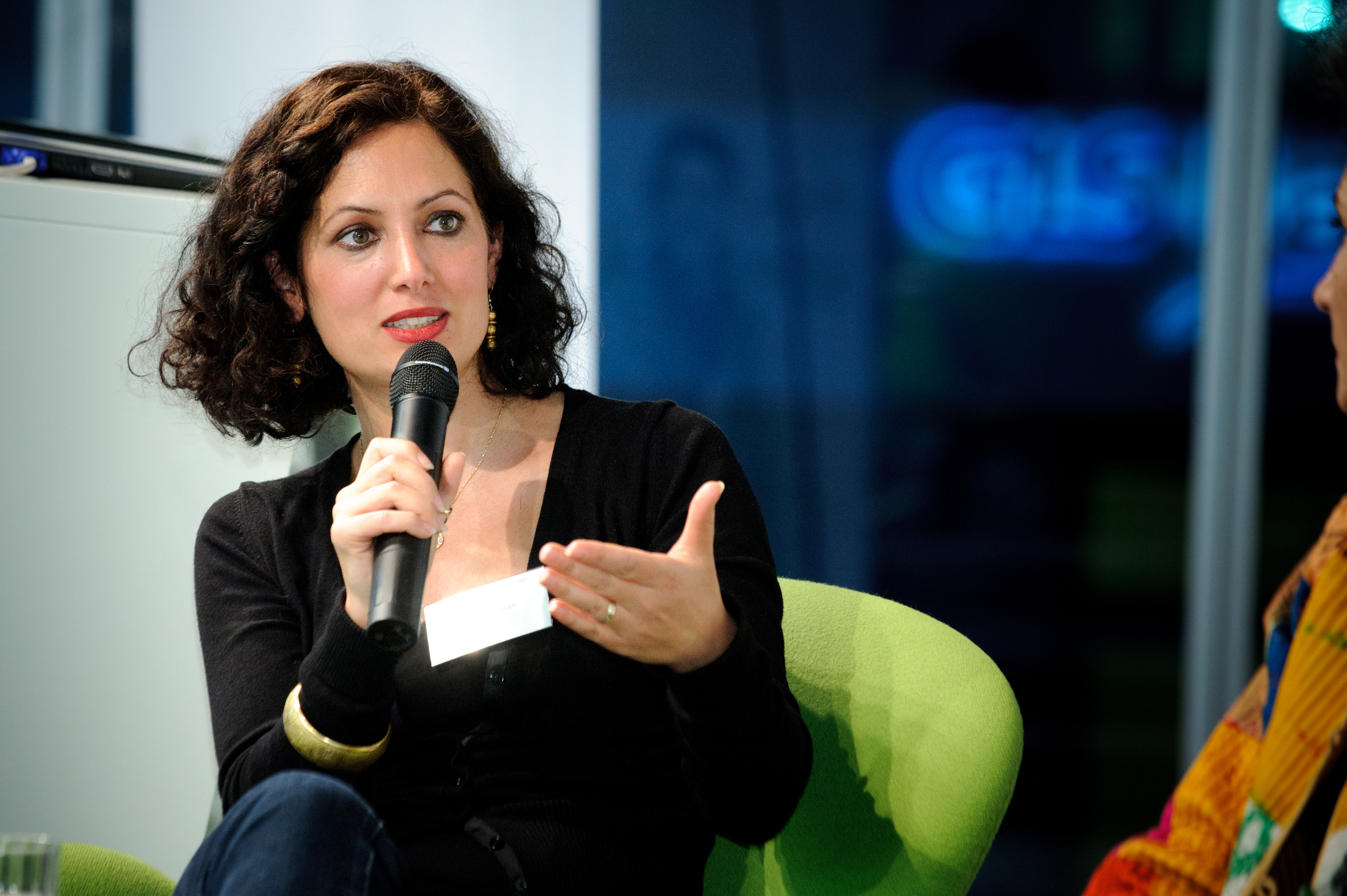
Foroutan in 2011

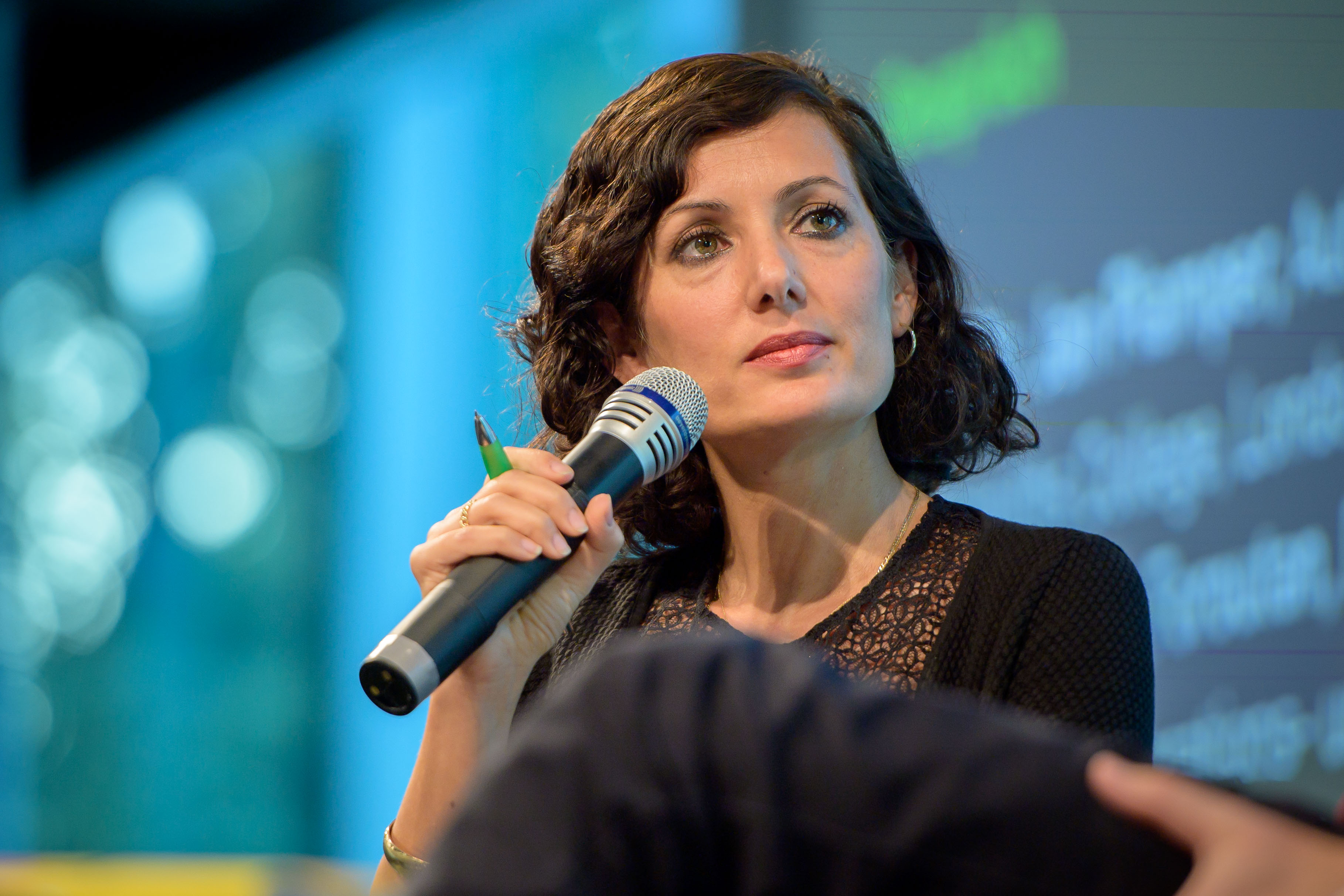
Foroutan in 2019

Foroutan is the daughter of a German mother and an Iranian father, football manager Bahman Foroutan. She is the sister of actress Melika Foroutan. From 2010 to 2014, her father was coach of various amateur clubs in Berlin. Naika Foroutan lived for 11 years in Tehran and left Iran in 1983 with her family. Foroutan studied political science, Romance philology and Islamic studies at the University of Cologne. From 2000 to 2004 she studied for a doctorate at the University of Göttingen under Bassam Tibi, with the thematic area of Inter-civilisation Cultural Dialogues between the West and the Islamic World. She also served as a lecturer in international relations. Between 2006 and 2009, Foroutan taught at the Department of Politics of the Middle East at the Otto-Suhr-Institut of the Freie Universität Berlin, until she then switched to the Institute for Social Sciences of the Humboldt University of Berlin. From 2008 to 2013, with her colleague Isabel Schäfer, she led the research project Hybrid European-Muslim Identity Models (HEYMAT). The HEYMAT project was extended to 2013 by the Volkswagen Foundation until the year 2015. Since the extension, Naika Foroutan led the HEYMAT project. The HEYMAT project was completed at the end of June 2015.

In cooperation with the Mercator Foundation, Foroutan organized the Young Islam Conference-Berlin 2011 for the Humboldt University in Berlin. In the year 2012, another Young Islam Conference was held under her leadership. During the conference it was announced that the Young Islam Conference and a corresponding research project, Young Islam-related Issues in Germany, would continue up to the year 2016, with two million euros funding by the Mercator foundation. Since 2012, she has been co-head of the research project Concepts for the Development of Intelligence, Security and Prevention (CODISP), sponsored by the Federal Ministry of Education and Research.

== Selected publications ==
- Abou-Taam, Marwan; Esser, Jost; Foroutan, Naika, eds. (2010-11-25). Zwischen Konfrontation und Dialog: Der Islam als politische Größe (in German). Wiesbaden: VS Verlag für Sozialwissenschaften. ISBN 978-3-531-17279-8.
