= Bahman Foroutan =

Iranian football manager (born 1947)

Personal information
- Date of birth: 4 February 1947 (age 79)
- Place of birth: Tehran, Pahlavi Iran

Managerial career
- Years: Team
- 1984: TuS Koblenz
- 1999: Balestier Khalsa FC
- 2005–2007: Shamoushak Noshahr FC
- 2010: Türkiyemspor Berlin
- 2010–2011: Berliner AK 07
- 2011: Türkiyemspor Berlin
- 2013: Persepolis Shomal FC
- 2014: Hertha Zehlendorf
- 2024: Tasmania Berlin

Bahman Foroutan (Persian: بهمن فروتن; born 4 February 1947) is an Iranian football manager who lives and works in Germany. He has also managed Balestier Khalsa FC in Singapore and Shamoushak Noshahr FC in Iran.

== Early and personal life ==
Foroutan was born in Tehran. His father aspired for him to work in the film industry.

Foroutan is the father of German actress Melika Foroutan, German social scientist Naika Foroutan and German football manager Nikolai Foroutan.

== Management style ==
Foroutan has used a back four. He has been described as "impulsive on the sidelines, meticulous on the tactics board".
