= Daniela Ziegler =

German actress and singer (born 1948)

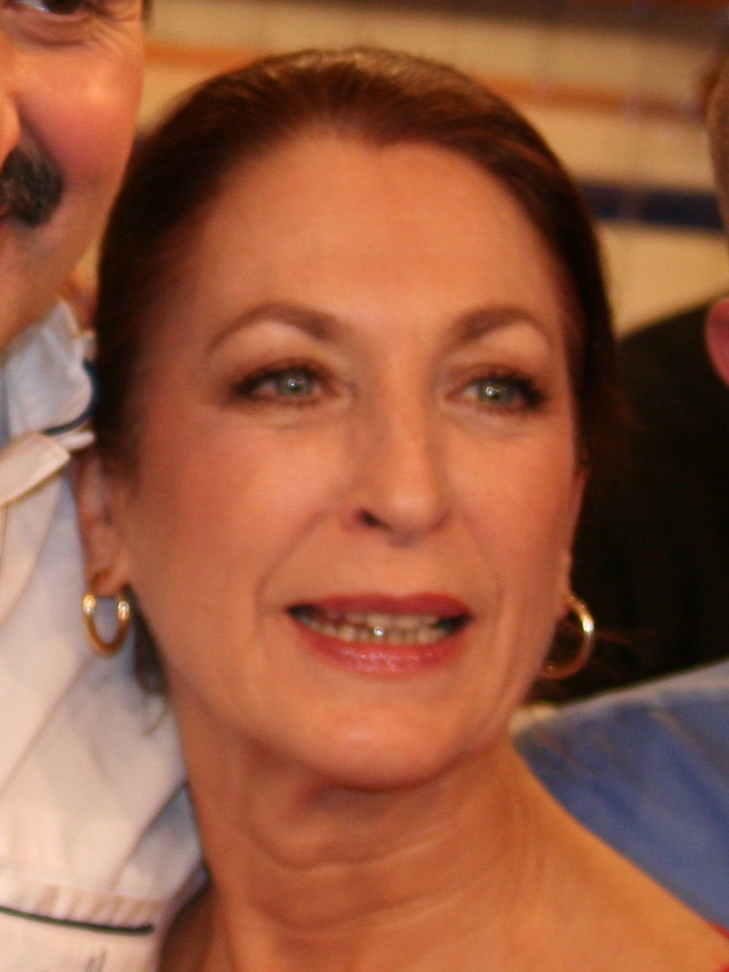
- Daniela Ziegler in a 2010 episode of the TV show Lafer, Lichter, Lecker
- Born: September 5, 1948 (age 77); Offenbach, Hesse, Germany
- Occupations: Actress and singer

Daniela Ziegler (born September 5, 1948) is a German actress and singer.

== Biography ==
After studying acting at the Schauspielschule Bochum, she had engagements in Trier, at the Deutsches Theater in Göttingen, at the State Theatre in Hanover, and at the Hamburg Theatre. After six years of professional work, she spent a few months in New York City in the professional musical training.

Since 1978, she has worked freelance and has had several engagements in Vienna, Frankfurt, Basel, Zurich, Hamburg, and Berlin.

She became familiar to German TV audiences starting with her role as Laura Schneider in Episode One of Ein Fall für zwei (A case for two) and later appeared later episodes. She also played leading roles in a number of other series.

As a singer, she is known for her performances in the Hamburg Evita and as Norma Desmond in the Niedernhausen performance of Sunset Boulevard. In several German cities, she sang in performances featuring the music of Kurt Weilll and Ralph Benatzky.

In 2003, she played the actress Susanna Gnad in Austria's criminal series SOKO Kitzbühel, in the episode Eine Mords-Rallye (The murder rallye).

In 2004, she appeared in Cyril Tuschis' film debut SommerHundeSöhne. From December 2010 onward, she has performed in the lead role of "Mother Superior" in the musical Sister Act in Hamburg.

== Bibliography ==
- Gienger, Zora; Ziegler, Daniela (2009). Aphrodite-Training (in German). Stuttgart: Haug. ISBN 978-3-8304-2282-2. OCLC 362859191.
