= Melika Foroutan =

German-Iranian actress (born 1976)

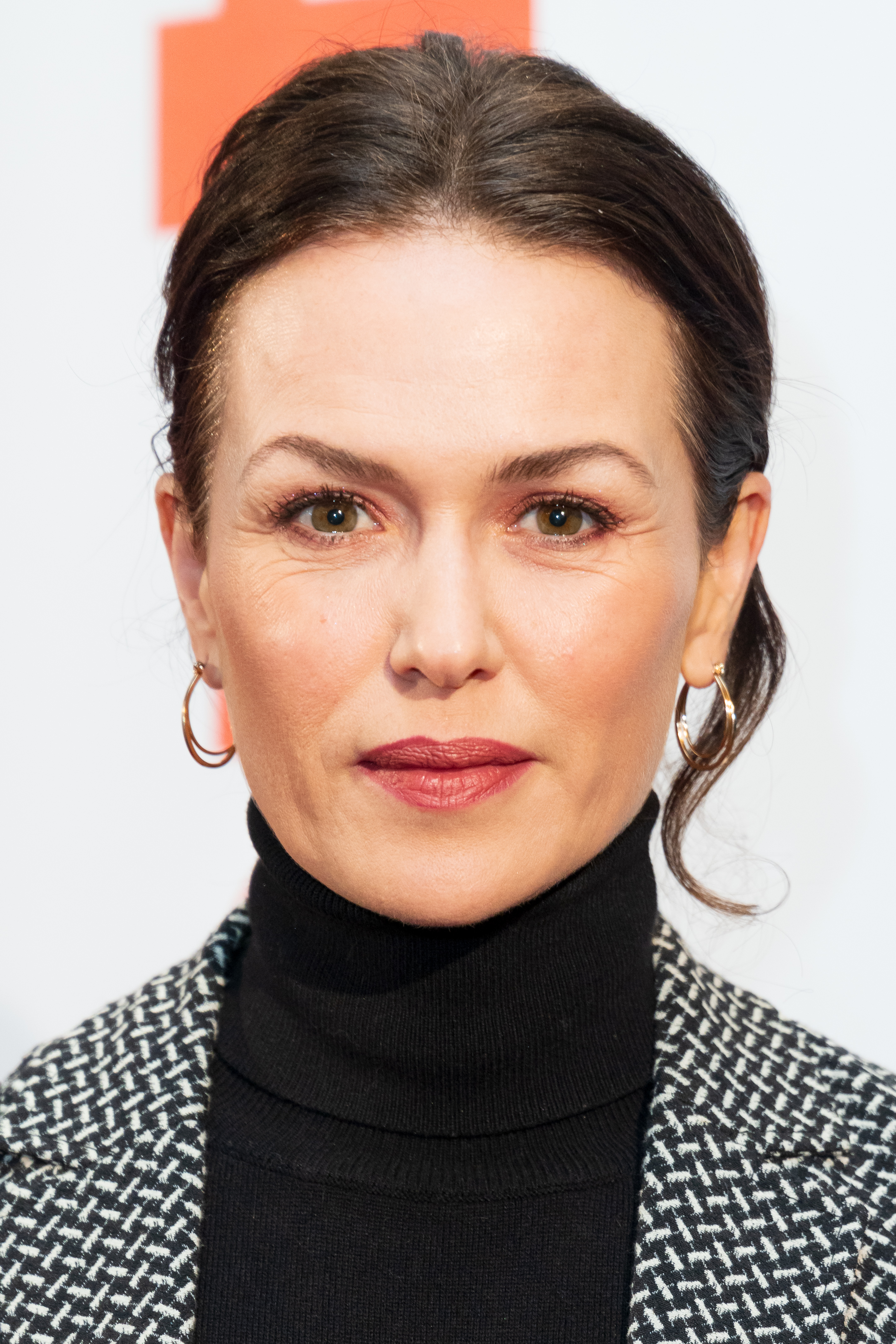
- Foroutan in 2023
- Born: 6 September 1976 (age 50); Tehran, Imperial State of Iran
- Education: University of Cologne; Berlin University of the Arts
- Occupation: Actress
- Father: Bahman Foroutan
- Relatives: Naika Foroutan (sister)

Melika Foroutan (born 6 September 1976) is a German-Iranian actress.

== Biography ==
Melika Foroutan, born 6 September 1976 in Tehran to football manager Bahman Foroutan, initially studied philosophy, English and history in Cologne from 1995 to 1998. She then enrolled in the acting class at the University of Arts (UdK) in Berlin, where she graduated in 2002. In the three following years, she was part of the company at the Schauspielhaus Leipzig.

She had breakout roles in 2006 with the drama Wut ("Anger") and as police officer Silvia Henke in the critically acclaimed TV show KDD – Kriminaldauerdienst. In 2015 she was awarded best actress at the Hessischer Filmpreis for her role in Louise Boni.

The 70th Filmfest Berlin featured Foroutan in the title role of the film Pari, directed by Siamak Etemadi in the Section Panorama. When Iranian Pari arrives in Athens with her husband, her son is not at the airport as planned. Pari sets off in search of him and gets deeply caught up in the fabric of this foreign city.

As of January 2013, Foroutan was living in Berlin with a male partner from Dortmund.

== Filmography ==
- 2000: Für dich mein Herz (short)
- 2004: Blond: Eva Blond! – Der Zwerg im Schließfach (TV series episode)
- 2004: Room Service (TV film)
- 2005–2007: Der Fürst und das Mädchen (TV series, 10 episodes)
- 2006: Vogel im Käfig (short)
- 2006: Alles über Anna (TV series, 10 episodes)
- 2006: Krieg der Frauen (TV film)
- 2006: Rage (TV film)
- 2007: Bittersüsses Nichts (short)
- 2007: Drei Reisende (short)
- 2007–2010: KDD – Kriminaldauerdienst (TV series, 28 episodes)
- 2008: Nachtschicht – Ich habe Angst (TV series episode)
- 2008: Die dunkle Seite (TV film)
- 2008: Lutter – Ein toter Bruder (TV series episode)
- 2008: Palermo Shooting
- 2009: Der Kapitän – Packeis (TV series episode)
- 2009: 66/67: Fairplay Is Over
- 2009: Flemming – Der Tag ohne gestern (TV series episode)
- 2010: Stolberg – Familienbande (TV series episode)
- 2011: The Crocodiles: All for One
- 2011: Von Mäusen und Lügen (TV film)
- 2011: Der Duft von Holunder (TV film)
- 2011: The Man with the Bassoon (TV film)
- 2011: It's Not Over (TV film)
- 2011: Unter Verdacht – Persönliche Sicherheiten (TV series episode)
- 2011: Und dennoch lieben wir (TV film)
- 2011: Schief gewickelt (TV film)
- 2012: Das Ende einer Nacht (TV film)
- 2013: The Ice Queen (TV film)
- 2013: Weissensee – Der verlorene Sohn (TV series episode)
- 2013: Among Enemies (TV film)
- 2014: Sarajevo (TV film)
- 2014: The Ingredients of Love (TV film)
- 2014: Die Mamba
- 2014: Louise Boni – Mord im Zeichen des Zen (TV series episode)
- 2015: Louise Boni – Jäger in der Nacht (TV series episode)
- 2016: Der gute Bulle (TV film)
- 2017: Reich oder Tot (TV film)
- 2018: Wiener Blut (TV film)
- 2019: Tribes of Europa (TV series, 6 episodes)
- 2020: The Winemaker (TV miniseries)
- 2020: Mediterraneo: The Law of the Sea
- 2022–2024: The Empress (TV series, 12 episodes)
- 2025: Prisoner 951 (TV series as Narges Mohammadi)

== Awards ==
- 2015 Hessischer Fernsehpreis for her role in Begierde – Mord im Zeichen des Zen.
