= Der Theatermacher =

1984 play by Thomas Bernhard

Der Theatermacher (The Showman in Eng.) is a play written by Austrian author Thomas Bernhard in 1984.

== Content ==
The play is about an actor called Bruscon from the state theater, who stops in the small village of Utzbach on tour to perform his play "Das Rad der Geschichte“ ("The Wheel of History"). His whole family (his wife, his son and his daughter) act in the play.

At the beginning, Bruscon is in conversation with the landlord of the inn where the play is to take place, insisting that the fire office in the village must allow the extinction of the emergency light at the end of the play. Bruscon complains about the humidity of the room, his fear of a floor breaking through and the fact that Utzbach seems too small for his "outstanding" work. In addition, learns from the landlord that the day of performance coincides with the famous "Blutwursttag" (blood sausage day) in the village and that, consequently, many locals won't have time to watch the play.

While rehearsing the play with his children and his wife, who appears to have a cold ("Your mother wastes her entire talent pretending to be sick"), Bruscon, the dramatist, turns out to be a true tyrant. Again and again, he insults off the theatrical talent of the others, emphasising his own great talent and demands to be served by the others. Often he gets entangled in contradictory statements without realizing it. For example, he says to the son: "You are my biggest disappointment, you know it, but you have never disappointed me, you are my useful servant." The only moment of rehearsal in which the family escapes from Bruscon's tirades is when they eat together the local soup speciality, which Bruscon had expressly ordered from the landlord at the beginning.

Bruscon's play, in which he says all comedies are included, ultimately goes awry. After violent thunder at the beginning of the performance, the spectators leave the inn because a flash of lightning has hit the inn and it is raining through the roof of the room. Bruscon remains behind in the rain deeply disappointed.

== Allusions ==
Der Thatermacher is rich in allusions to Salzburg and the Salzburg Festival.

- The scene Schwarzer Hirsch in Utzbach alludes to the Hotel Goldener Hirsch in Salzburg, which is located in the immediate vicinity of the festival district.
- The dispute over the emergency light refers to the scandal around the second performance of Bernhard's play Der Ignorant und der Wahnsinnige ("The Ignoramus and the Madman"), which was premiered at the Salzburg Festival in 1972 under the direction of Claus Peymann.
- Even before the premiere, it was said that Oskar Werner was the role model for the theater maker Bruscon in the run-up to the premiere, but this was disputed or doubted by Claus Peymann, the director of the world premiere.
