= Tessa Mittelstaedt =

German actress (born 1974)

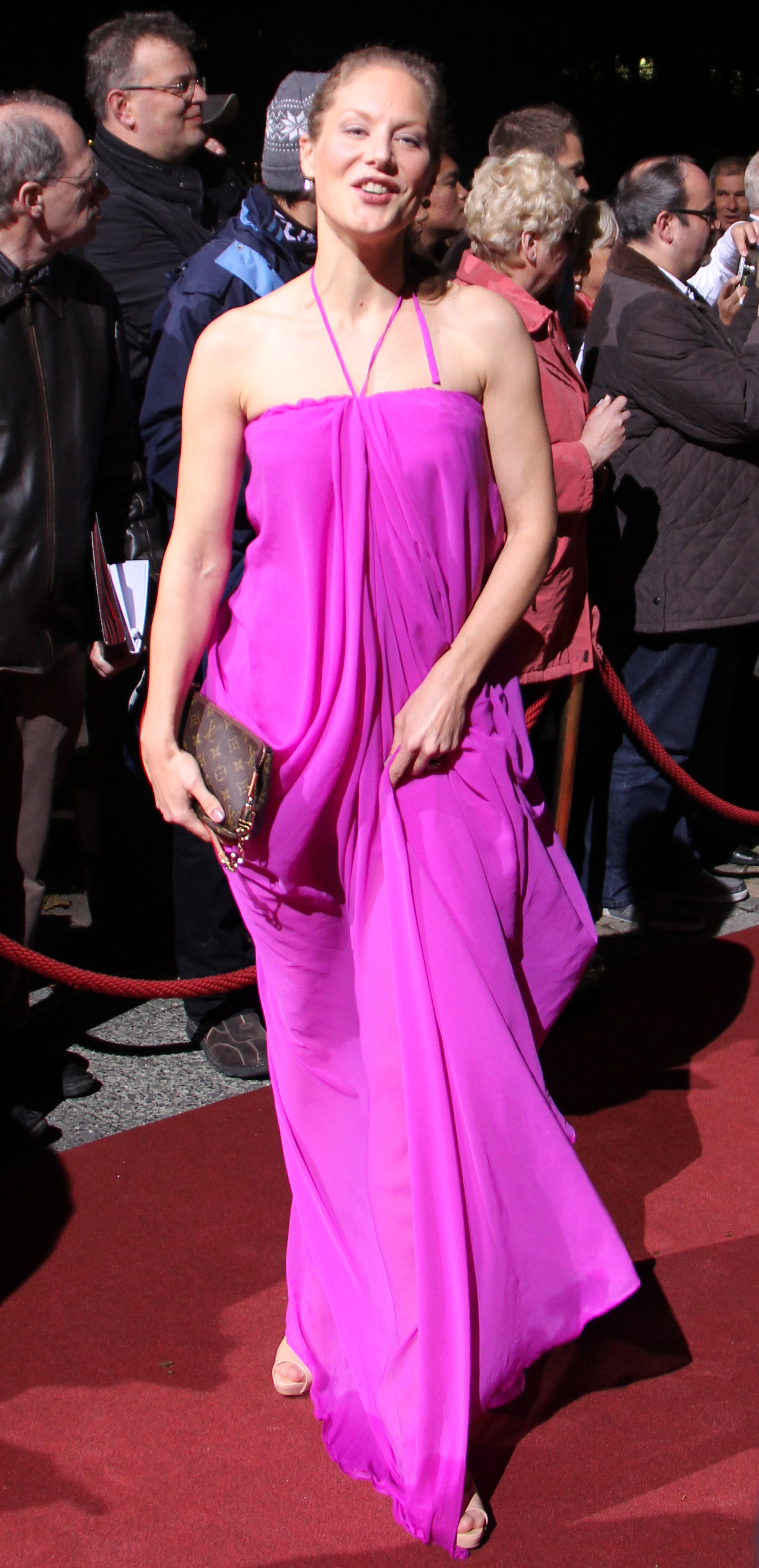
Tessa Mittelstaedt in 2012

Tessa Mittelstaedt (born 1 April 1974 in Ulm) is a German actress. She is best known for playing the role of Franziska Lüttgenjohann in the Westdeutscher Rundfunk iteration of Tatort, alongside Klaus J. Behrendt and Dietmar Bär. She's also known for playing Andrea Junginger in the German drama TV series Der Bergdoktor from season 2 to season 4.
