= Janna Maria Nandzik =

German screenwriter, director, and producer (born 1980)

- Born: 1980 (age 45–46); Oldenburg, Lower Saxony, West Germany
- Occupations: Director, screenwriter, producer

Janna Maria Nandzik (born 1980 in Oldenburg) is a German screenwriter, director and producer. At the age of 28, she founded two film production companies together with entertainer and actor Christian Ulmen and created and produced her first TV series. The walk-and-talk sitcom The Snobs (ZDFneo, 18 episodes) followed three bon vivants in despair during their 18-hole course of golf.

Nandzik’s directing debut came in 2012 with the German-French transmedia series About:Kate (Arte, 14 episodes), which explored the identity crises of a 30-year-old woman losing herself in the depths of digitalism. The interactive show won awards in Germany and Switzerland. After a stint as Creative Director for Tele5, a Munich-based television network, Nandzik returned to creating and writing in Berlin.

She has written for multiple series, including the dark comedy Jerks (ProSieben) and teen drama Druck (ZDFneo/funk), as well as the historical drama The Empress which won the International Emmy for Best Drama Series in 2023.

She directed the TV movie Die Innenministerkonferenz (ZDF), a satirical murder mystery written by journalist and television host Jan Böhmermann and writer Carla Kaspari.

By October 2023, Nandzik started working on a six-part Berlin-set series with Stefan Titze (How to Sell Drugs Online (Fast)) based on the novel Oval by Elvia Wilk. The drama revolves around the unexpected side effects of an empathy pill on the city.

In 2017, Janna Maria Nandzik founded the salon and club "The School of Death", a non-profit organization in Berlin that offers various workshops and lectures on the subject of death and dying. The project aims to integrate discussions about the end of life into everyday life.

== Awards ==
- 2013: Geneva International Film Festival, Youth Jury Award For Best Transmedia Work for About:Kate
- 2014: Crossmedia Prize of the Bremische Landesmedienanstalt and Radio Bremen for About:Kate
- 2019 Deutscher Comedypreis, Best Comedy Series for Jerks season 2
- 2019 Deutscher Fernsehpreis, Best Comedy Series for Jerks season 2
- 2023 International Emmy for best drama series for The Empress

== Nominations ==
- 2011 Grimme-Preis nomination in the category "Entertainment" for The Snobs
- 2014: Grimme-Preis, nomination for Janna Nandzik for concept and realization of the interactive, multimedia project About:Kate in the category Fiction/Special.
- 2019 Grimme-Preis nomination in the category "Children & Youth" for Druck

== Selected filmography ==
Writer
Year	Title	Starring	Notes
2012	About:Kate	Natalia Belitski, Therese Affolter, Patrick von Blume, Anna Böttcher, Greta Bohacek, Wilfried Hochholdinger, Christian Harting	Mini Series
2017	Jerks	Christian Ulmen, Fahri Yardim, Emily Cox, Pheline Roggan, Collien Ulmen-Fernandes, Jasna Fritzi Bauer	Season 3
2018	Druck	Lilly Dreesen, Milena Tscharntke, Michelangelo Fortuzzi, Tua El-Fawwal	Season 2
2019	Druck	Tua El-Fawwal, Hassan Kello, Lilly Dreesen, Leanora Zoë Voss, Nobel Mokonzi, Milena Tscharntke	Season 4
2023	The Empress	Devrim Lingnau, Melika Foroutan, Almila Bagriacik, Elisa Schlott, Jördis Triebel, Svenja Jung	Season 1

Director
Year	Title	Starring	Notes
2012	About:Kate	Natalia Belitski, Therese Affolter, Patrick von Blume, Anna Böttcher, Greta Bohacek, Wilfried Hochholdinger, Christian Harting	Mini Series
2022	Die Innenministerkonferenz	Jan Böhmermann, Lena Dörrie, Henny Reents, Christoph Zrenner, Ole Fischer, Rainer Reiners, Armin Dillenberger, Luzia Oppermann	ZDF Magazin Royale
2023	Tits of Terror	Dennenesch Zoudé, Christina Schlag, Dirk Martens, Gábor Biedermann, Schlecky Silberstein, Michael Specht	Browser Ballett
