= Philip Froissant =

German actor (born 1994)

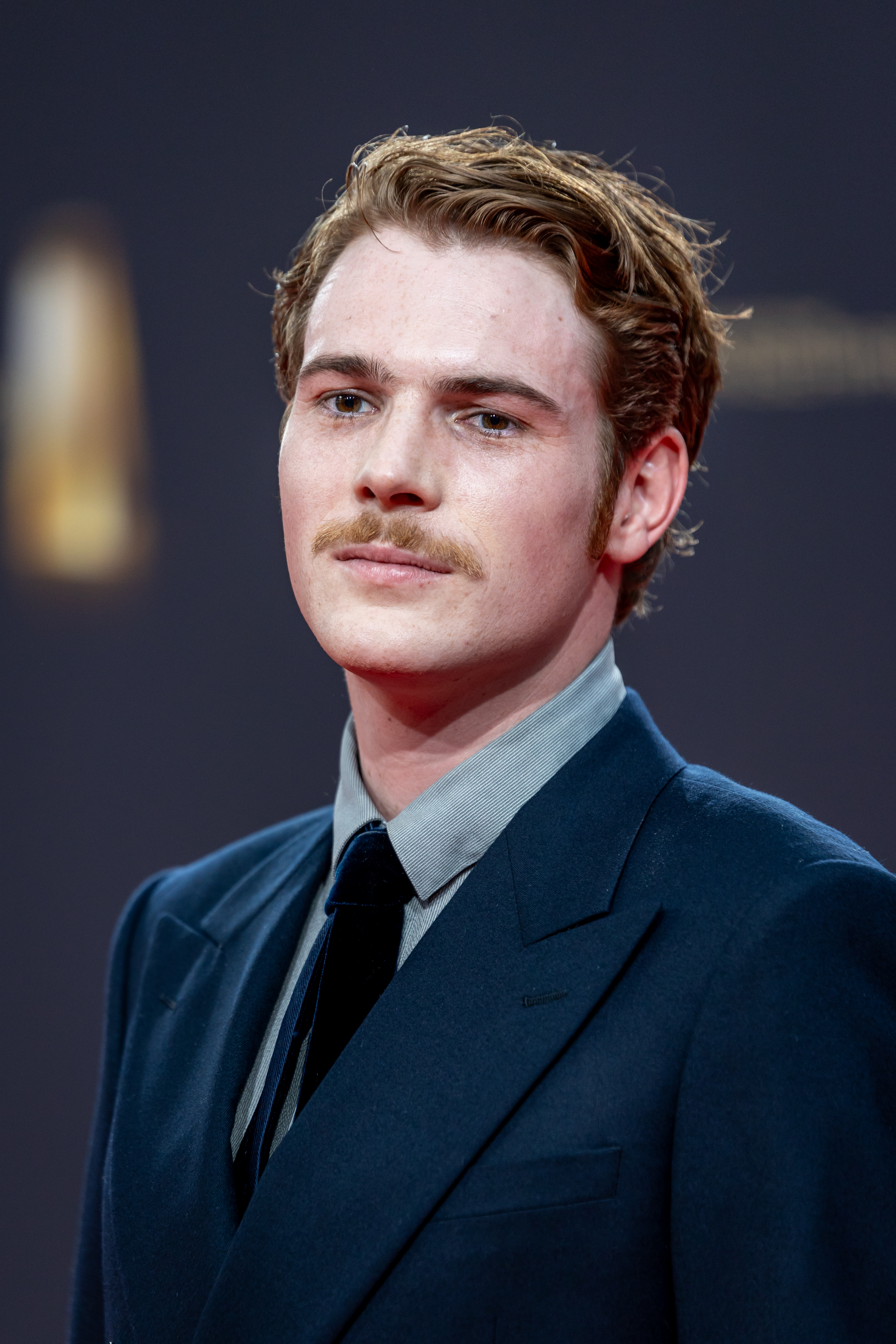
- Philip Froissant at the 2023 German Television Award
- Born: 1994 (age 31–32); Bad Tölz, Germany
- Occupation: Actor

Philip Froissant (born 1994 in Bad Tölz) is a German actor.

== Life ==
Froissant was born in Bad Tölz to a German mother and a French father. After completing his secondary education (Abitur), he undertook scientific training, which he completed in 2015, before deciding to pursue a different career. Following numerous internships in the film industry, he decided to study theatre studies at Ludwig Maximilian University of Munich. In 2017, Froissant made his stage debut in Anja Sczilinski's production of Lilja-4-ever at the Junges Residenztheater München. In September 2018, he left his theatre studies programme early to begin acting training at the Otto Falckenberg School in Munich, graduating in 2022. In June 2021, he appeared in the graduating class production of Der große Marsch by Wolfram Lotz, directed by Anne Habermehl, at the Münchner Kammerspiele.

In autumn 2020, Froissant filmed the thriller Schwarze Insel, directed by Miguel Alexandre, on the island of Amrum. In the film, which was released on Netflix in August 2021, he played the leading role of high school graduate Jonas Hansen, who moves to a North Sea island to live with his grandfather, portrayed by Hanns Zischler, following the accidental deaths of his parents. There, he meets his German teacher, Helena (Alice Dwyer).

Since 2022, Froissant has played the leading male role of Emperor Franz Joseph I in the Netflix series The Empress, alongside Devrim Lingnau, who portrays Elisabeth of Austria-Hungary. For his portrayal of Franz Joseph, he received the German Television Award for Best Actor in 2023. The second season of the series, which received an International Emmy Award, was released on Netflix in late November 2024.

In 2023, Froissant took on the leading role of John Fontanelli in the Paramount+ series Eine Billion Dollar. Fontanelli is a bicycle courier who becomes the richest person in the world overnight following an unexpected inheritance. The series is based on Andreas Eschbach's bestselling novel of the same name, Eine Billion Dollar.

== Filmography (selected) ==
- 2021: Schwarze Insel
- 2022–2026: The Empress (television series, 3 seasons)
- 2023: Am Ende – Die Macht der Kränkung (television series)
- 2023: Eine Billion Dollar (television series)
- 2025: Miroirs No. 3
- 2026: Der Heimatlose
- 2026: Charité (television series)
- 2027: Mabuse (television series)

== Awards and nominations ==
- German Television Award 2023 – Winner in the category Best Actor for The Empress
