= Supernatural horror film =

Film genre that combines aspects of horror film and supernatural film

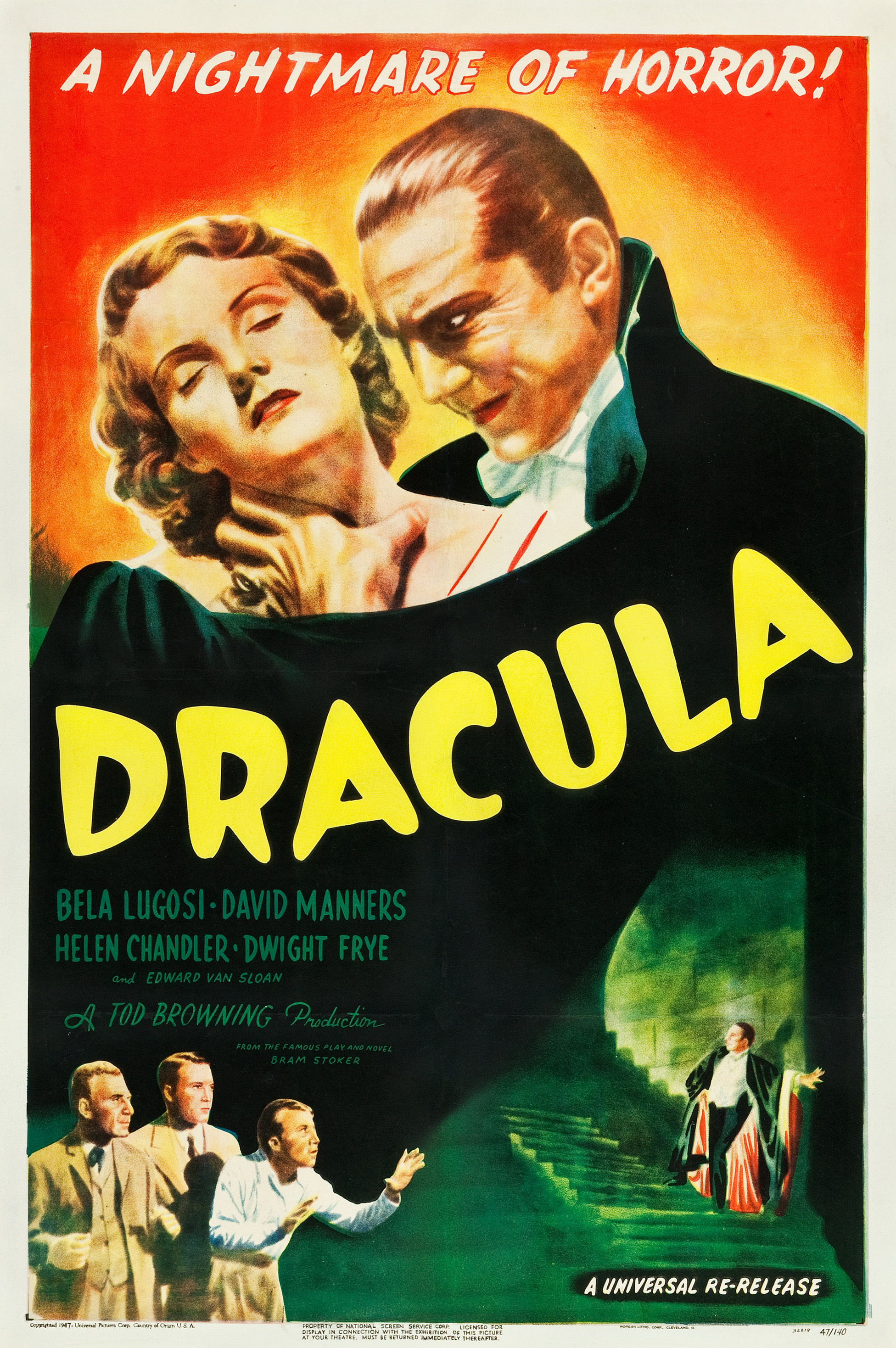
Films such as Dracula (1931) popularized the genre of supernatural horror film.

Supernatural horror film is a genre that combines aspects of supernatural and horror film. Supernatural occurrences in such films often include ghosts and demons, and many supernatural horror films have elements of religion. Common themes in the genre are the afterlife, the devil, and demonic possession. Not all supernatural horror films focus on religion, and they can have "more vivid and gruesome violence".

== Comparisons ==
For such films and other media, critics distinguish supernatural horror from psychological horror. Mathias Clasen writes in Why Horror Seduces, "Supernatural horror involves some kind of suspension or breach of physical law, usually embodied in or caused by some kind of supernatural agency such as an uncanny monster or a ghost... psychological horror, on the other hand, does not involve violations of physical law, but features naturalistic (if often implausible) menaces and scenarios." Paul Meehan also distinguishes supernatural horror films from psychological horror, "The threat to societal order comes from something preternatural or anomalous: a haunted house, a curse, or a monster [such as] a vampire or a werewolf."

Charles Derry, writing in Dark Dreams 2.0, contrasted supernatural horror and pseudoscientific horror as "two basic methods of explaining things away" in horror stories. Derry wrote, "Into the supernatural group one could fit all the monsters and horrors that are somehow involved with religions and ritual," highlighting witchcraft, Egyptology and reincarnation, and zombies. Aaron Smuts considers horror "to be a genre with two main sub-types, supernatural horror and realist horror" and that they "have different charms".

== History ==
=== 20th century ===
While fictional horror-themed literature, theatre, and other visual culture had existed, the terms "horror film" and "horror movie" as known in a contemporary term did not become common place until 1931 and 1932. Film serials became popular in the United States in 1913. Supernatural events and characters in 1910s film serials were rare. Only two serials explored the supernatural at length, with The Mysteries of Myra (1916) and The Screaming Shadow (1920) while most serials which suggested the supernatural such as The Gray Ghost (1917) with no actual narratives involving supernatural events. The supernatural horror film had what author Paul Meehan described as "its genesis" in early German expressionism in the 1920s and early 1930s with films such as The Cabinet of Dr. Caligari and Nosferatu. During the Universal Studios first horror film cycle, supernatural horror was the dominant cinematic mode of the genre between the release of Dracula (1931) and House of Dracula (1945).

In the early 1940s, supernatural horror films had more contemporary settings, but the genre was ultimately superseded by psychological horror films. By the end of World War II, the supernatural horror genre had "met its demise", being overshadowed by the atrocities of the war. By the 1950s, science fiction horror films had replaced supernatural horror films, and psychological horror films also became more popular in the same decade, ultimately eclipsing supernatural horror. The few supernatural horror films that were produced in the 1950s were often set in haunted houses, a continuation of haunted-house films prevalent in the 1940s.

In the 1960s, horror films such as The Innocents (1961), The Haunting (1963), and Rosemary's Baby (1968) used supernatural elements but were not directly about the paranormal. Other horror films used supernatural themes to code elements being censored by the Motion Picture Production Code (or the Hays Code). The Haunting featured a female protagonist interested in another woman, and she was a queer coded character. Such characters were commonplace in the history of supernatural horror films. Sue Matheson wrote of Rosemary's Baby, "[It] popularized depictions of witchcraft, demonic activity, and the Devil on screen and generated a wave of supernatural horror movies." By the 1970s, the films The Exorcist (1973) and The Omen (1976) revived the supernatural horror genre. Literature was used as source material as it had with respect to the earliest films, the written works of Stephen King being adapted into Carrie (1976) and The Shining (1980). The film Poltergeist (1982) was also a genre highlight in the 1980s.

=== 21st century ===
In the 2000s, violent horror films called "torture porn" became popular, but, by the end of the decade, supernatural horror had regained its popularity. The found footage film The Blair Witch Project had achieved fame in 1999, and in the late 2000s, Paranormal Activity succeeded with the same film technique, which led to a film series that lasted until the mid-2010s.

In the first two decades of the 21st century, supernatural horror films explored a variety of themes and styles. Martyrs Lane (2021) focused on grief and loss, while Oculus (2013), Personal Shopper (2016), and Hereditary (2018) explored unfinished family business and personal trauma. The genre also incorporated real historical events, as seen in The Devil's Backbone (2001), Los Silencios (2018), and La Llorona (2019), which draw on the Spanish Civil War, the Colombian conflict, and the Guatemalan genocide, respectively. Films such as Host (2020) reflected contemporary fears, with The Others (2001) and Insidious (2010) revisiting haunted house narratives, and The Conjuring (2013) grounding its story in real-life paranormal investigations. The genre also blended horror with comedy, as in Housebound (2014) and Extra Ordinary (2019), to explore similar themes. The films employed various techniques, such as jump-scares, tension-building, and emotive performances, to examine deep-rooted fears and societal issues.

== Box office ==
The highest-grossing supernatural horror film, adjusted for inflation, is The Exorcist (1973). It has an unadjusted gross of over $441 million with the original release and 2000 re-release combined; the estimated adjusted gross in 2019 is over $1.04 billion. The highest-grossing supernatural horror film, unadjusted for inflation, is It (2017) with a worldwide gross of $701 million.

In 2013, Variety's Andrew Stewart said that supernatural horror films grossed more at the box office than other horror sub-genres. He advised that filmmakers interested in tapping into the profitable market of low-budget horror should focus more on stories about ghosts and the supernatural, as movies about slashers and extreme horror tend to have less consistent commercial success.

== Use of music ==
Joe Tompkins wrote that following the 1950s, many "Gothic and supernatural horror movies utilize dissonance, atonality, and unusual configurations of instruments to signify all sorts of anomalous, paranormal activity". He wrote that Black Sunday (1960) and The Haunting (1963) "make use of atonal clusters, which operate in sharp contrast to tonal music and thus provide antagonistic symbols for supernatural evil and good (respectively)". He also highlighted that The Amityville Horror (1979) and Poltergeist (1982) "employ various thematic materials ranging from soft-sounding lullabies to atonal outbursts".

According to Janet K. Halfyard, supernatural horror-comedy films deploy various strategies to using music "to simultaneously locate the film within—or at least close to—the horror genre, while at the same time encouraging the audience to laugh instead of scream".

== Bibliography ==
- Benshoff, Harry M., ed. (2017). A Companion to the Horror Film. ISBN 978-1-119-33501-6.
- Meehan, Paul (2010). Horror Noir: Where Cinema's Dark Sisters Meet. McFarland. ISBN 978-0-7864-6219-3.
- Rhodes, Gary D. (2022). "The 'Horror Serials; of the 1910s: Episodes in the Construction of a Film Genre". Historical Journal of Film, Radio and Television. 42 (4).
