= The Trap (German TV series) =

2026 German television miniseries

- Release poster
- German: Die Falle
- Genre: Psychological thriller
- Based on: Die Falle by Melanie Raabe
- Written by: Isabel Kleefeld
- Directed by: Isabel Kleefeld
- Starring: Friederike Becht; Hans Löw; Matthias Brandt; Anna Schudt; Miriam Ohlmeyer; Josephine Thiesen; Malaya Stern Takeda; Ursula Strauss; Sesede Terziyan; Michael Klammer
- Music by: Volker Bertelmann; Ben Winkler
- Country of origin: Germany
- Original language: German
- No. of episodes: 6

Production
- Executive producer: Oliver Berben
- Producers: Tom Spiess; Friederich Oetker
- Cinematography: Martin Langer
- Editors: Renata Salazar Ivancan; Nicole Kortlüke
- Running time: 43–52 minutes
- Production company: Constantin Film

Original release
- Network: Netflix
- Release: 13 October 2026

The Trap (German: Die Falle) is a 2026 German psychological thriller television miniseries based on Melanie Raabe's 2015 debut novel of the same name. Directed and written by Isabel Kleefeld, the series was produced by Constantin Film for Netflix. The series stars Friederike Becht and Hans Löw; all six episodes were released simultaneously on 13 October 2026.

Reuniting the creative team behind the International Emmy Award-winning series Dear Child, the production was filmed in and around Düsseldorf, as well as in Cologne, in 2025. Reviewers widely praised Becht's central performance, though several critics faulted the show's intricate narrative structure and uneven pacing.

== Premise ==
Having seen her sister Anna killed, bestselling novelist Lisa Konrad has lived in seclusion for nearly a decade. When she recognises star reporter and war correspondent Robert Lenzen on television as the man she believes is the killer, and finds the police dismiss her claims, she decides to use herself as bait. She plans to write a novel inspired by Anna's case and invites Lenzen for an exclusive interview, her first ever. Hoping to secure his DNA, Lisa prepares for the encounter by researching his background, stopping her medication, and undergoing interrogation training.

== Cast ==
=== Main ===
- Friederike Becht as Lisa Konrad, a bestselling author
- Hans Löw as Robert Lenzen, a journalist
- Matthias Brandt as Norbert Rudow, Lisa's publisher
- Anna Schudt as Pia, Lisa's literary agent
- Miriam Ohlmeyer as Sophie, a character in Lisa's novel; she also plays the young Lisa
- Josephine Thiesen as Anna, Lisa's sister
- Malaya Stern Takeda as Yuma, Lisa's assistant
- Ursula Strauss as Dr. Shelley Anger, Lisa's therapist
- Sesede Terziyan as Narges Akbari, an investigator
- Michael Klammer as Leon Weber, an investigator

=== Supporting ===
- Peter Lohmeyer and Anna Stieblich as Lisa's parents
- Naila Schuberth as Toni, Robert Lenzen's daughter

== Episodes ==
Episodes
No.	Title	Running time	Original release date
1	"The Monster"	43 minutes	13 October 2026
2	"The Novel"	45 minutes	13 October 2026
3	"The Training"	49 minutes	13 October 2026
4	"The Interview"	50 minutes	13 October 2026
5	"The Confession"	52 minutes	13 October 2026
6	"The Truth"	52 minutes	13 October 2026

== Production ==
=== Development ===
Melanie Raabe's debut novel Die Falle was published in 2015, becoming a Der Spiegel bestseller and receiving numerous translations. The Hollywood Reporter reported in June 2015 that TriStar Pictures had acquired the film rights, with Elizabeth Cantillon and Josh Bratman producing, while Text Publishing acquired the world English-language rights from Random House Germany. The Australian publisher released Imogen Taylor's translation in 2016. In May 2017, Mark Pellington was attached to direct a film adaptation written by Phyllis Nagy. The television adaptation alters the protagonist's name from Linda Conrads to Lisa Konrad, which Kleefeld felt sounded more like an ordinary real name.

The Trap was announced as a limited series at the "Next on Netflix" event in Berlin on 29 January 2025. Isabel Kleefeld served as writer, director, and showrunner. She had presented her ideas to Raabe beforehand to ensure she understood the novel fully. The project was produced by Tom Spiess and Friederich Oetker for Constantin Film, with Oliver Berben as executive producer. It reunited the creative team behind Dear Child, which had won an International Emmy Award in the TV Movie/Mini-Series category. According to Filmstarts, Dear Child amassed 82 million views. Spiess described the new series as a story of self-empowerment, while Oetker said the story reminded him a bit of Alfred Hitchcock's Rear Window, noting that making the protagonist the bait was an unusual setup.

=== Casting ===
The primary cast, including Friederike Becht, Hans Löw, Matthias Brandt, Miriam Ohlmeyer, Josephine Thiesen, Malaya Stern Takeda, Anna Schudt, and Michael Klammer, was revealed on 3 June 2025. Ursula Strauss and Sesede Terziyan were named in the 15 September 2026 cast list. Becht and Löw had previously acted together in the television film Im Rausch. To prepare for her role, Becht underwent combat-technique training with coach Marc Schweflinghaus and researched interrogation techniques. She described the experience as staging a duel: "Over several weeks, we really staged a duel – a fight my character prepared for meticulously, both mentally and physically." Löw, who previously appeared in the Dear Child ensemble, highlighted the appeal of playing an ambiguous investigative journalist, calling the role a "huge playground".

=== Filming ===
By 3 June 2025, principal photography was underway in and around Düsseldorf, as well as in Cologne. According to Crew United, there were 74 shooting days between 25 March and 30 July 2025 in Cologne, Düsseldorf, and Italy. Kleefeld said that more than 80 per cent of the series takes place in one location. Löw stated the two-character confrontation scenes were shot in a studio over approximately two weeks. According to Kleefeld, filming the episode 4 interview took a little over a week. The crew included cinematographer Martin Langer, production designer Cordula Jedamski, costume designer Katharina Schnelting, and casting director Sabine Schwedhelm. Renata Salazar Ivancan and Nicole Kortlüke edited the series, while Volker Bertelmann and Ben Winkler composed the music.

== Release ==
Netflix unveiled the official trailer and key art on 15 September 2026. Netflix lists the production as a limited series. All six episodes were released simultaneously on 13 October 2026. According to Serienjunkies, it reached second place in the German charts within hours of its premiere.

== Reception ==
A review from dpa described the series as a successful psychological thriller with a clever, intricately built story and surprising moments. Writing for TV Wunschliste, Marcus Kirzynowski awarded it 4 out of 5, considering it a successful example of the high-end drama one would like to see more often from major streaming platforms. Moustique noted that the suspense is maintained across all six episodes, and Eastern Eye closed its review with the verdict to "Stream it". Maurizio Encari of Movieplayer.it gave it 3.5 out of 5. Conversely, Jonathon Wilson of Ready Steady Cut rated it 2.5 out of 5, arguing it was "too twisty for its own good".

Critics praised the performances. Becht's acting was described as superb by Filmstarts and formidable by Moustique. Eastern Eye named her the standout performer, while The Sunday Guardian called her central performance the strongest element of the show. Susanne Bald of teleschau called the series solid thriller fare, praising the cast and Becht's intense performance. Löw's performance was also praised as an effective counterpoint by The Sunday Guardian, with Filmstarts similarly declaring his work superb.

The storytelling structure and pacing drew criticism from several reviewers. Kirzynowski praised the dense staging and the effective use of memory fragments to create uncertainty. However, he wrote that the plot was not always logical, some character motives remained unclear, and elements were explained away too easily. He added that given the constant suspense and original staging, these flaws did not weigh heavily. Eastern Eye found the shifting narrative levels unnecessarily confusing. Ready Steady Cut criticised its overly ambitious structure, and Markus Trutt of Filmstarts wrote that the show occasionally loses Lisa's perspective in uninspired, conventional flashbacks from other characters. Digital Fernsehen found that the constant switching between reality and fantasy becomes tiring at times. Some reviewers cited the pacing as a weakness: The Sunday Guardian cited uneven pacing, and teleschau suggested a 90-minute film would have sufficed. Movieplayer.it argued the ending was more predictable than the premise suggested. Moviepilot criticised the resolution's turn towards conventional crime drama, but praised the ambiguity of the final moments.

Reviewers also drew comparisons to Kleefeld's previous hit, Dear Child. Trutt wrote that while the presentation of Lisa's fictional novel was original at times, explanatory voice-overs reduced some of the series' emotional impact compared with Dear Child. Writing for teleschau, Bald added that it failed to grip consistently across all six episodes in the same way, and Moviepilot found it neither as twisty nor as dark as its predecessor.
