= Hysteria (2025 film) =

2025 German thriller drama film

- Teaser poster
- Directed by: Mehmet Akif Büyükatalay
- Screenplay by: Mehmet Akif Büyükatalay
- Produced by: Mehmet Akif Büyükatalay; Claus Herzog-Reichel
- Starring: Devrim Lingnau; Aziz Çapkurt; Serkan Kaya; Nicolette Krebitz; Nazmi Kırık; Mehdi Meskar
- Cinematography: Christian Kochmann
- Edited by: Denys Darahan; Andreas Menn
- Music by: Marvin Miller
- Production companies: Filmfaust Filmproduktion; Zweites Deutsches Fernsehen (ZDF)
- Distributed by: Real Fiction Filmverleih; Pluto Film Distribution Network GmbH [de]
- Release date: 15 February 2025 (Berlinale)
- Running time: 104 minutes
- Country: Germany
- Languages: Turkish; English; Kurdish; Arabic; German

Hysteria is a 2025 German thriller drama film written and directed by Mehmet Akif Büyükatalay. Starring Devrim Lingnau, the film story follows a film shoot as it takes a dark turn when the burning of a Quran throws the crew into turmoil.

The film was selected in the Panorama section of the Berlinale and had its premiere at the 75th Berlin International Film Festival on 15 February 2025.

== Synopsis ==
The film is set amidst the chaotic environment of a film production on a film about the racist attacks in Germany of the 1990s. The plot thickens when a Quran is burned on set, and all evidence of the incident vanishes. The assistant director finds herself entangled in a complex situation, attempting to uncover the truth. Various individuals involved in the production, including the film's producer, director, and several actors from a refugee home, each have their own version of events.

== Cast ==
- Devrim Lingnau as Elif
- Aziz Çapkurt as Mustafa
- Serkan Kaya as Yigit
- Nicolette Krebitz as Lilith
- Nazmi Kırık as Majid
- Mehdi Meskar as Said

== Production ==
Principal photography began on 15 December 2022 on locations in Köln, Rüsselsheim in Germany, and wrapped up filming on 12 April 2023 in Rüsselheim, Cologne and Hürth, cities located in the regions of Hesse and North Rhine-Westphalia.

== Release ==
Hysteria had its World premiere in the Panorama section of the 75th Berlin International Film Festival on 15 February 2025.

On 5 October 2025, it was presented in Panorama section of 2025 Vancouver International Film Festival.

== Reception ==
On review aggregator website Rotten Tomatoes, the film holds an approval rating of 93% based on 14 reviews, with an average rating of 6.6/10.

== Accolades ==
Award	Date	Category	Recipient	Result	Ref.
Berlin International Film Festival	23 February 2025	Panorama Audience Award for Best Feature Film	Mehmet Akif Büyükatalay	Nominated	
Berlin International Film Festival	23 February 2025	Europa Cinemas Label Award for Best European Film	Hysteria	Won	
Film Festival Cologne	26 October 2025	NRW Film Award	Hysteria	Won	
