= Black Island (film) =

- German: Schwarze Insel
- Directed by: Miguel Alexandre
- Written by: Miguel Alexandre; Lisa Carline Hofer
- Starring: Hanns Zischler; Alice Dwyer; Mercedes Müller
- Production companies: Netflix; Odeon Fiction
- Distributed by: Netflix
- Release date: 18 August 2021
- Running time: 1h 44minutes
- Country: Germany
- Language: German

Black Island (German: Schwarze Insel) is a 2021 German film directed by Miguel Alexandre, written by Miguel Alexandre and Lisa Carline Hofer and starring Hanns Zischler, Alice Dwyer and Mercedes Müller.

== Plot ==
The dark secrets of a seemingly peaceful island threaten to swallow up an orphaned student when he grows close to a mysterious new teacher.

== Cast ==
- Hanns Zischler as Friedrich Hansen
- Alice Dwyer as Helena Jung
- Mercedes Müller as Nina Cohrs
- Philip Froissant as Jonas Hansen
- Sammy Scheuritzel as Florian
- Lisa Carline Hofer as the young woman on the ferry
- Ilknur Boyraz as headmistress
- Katharina Schütz as Ingrid Hansen
- Charlotte Crome as secretary
- Altamasch Noor as hospital doctor
- Caroline Kiesewetter as Nina's mother
- Lieselotte Voss as Jule
- Marco Wittorf as Jonas' father
- Tina Rother as the hospital receptionist
- Florian Hacke as the janitor
- Katja Geist as PE teacher
- Jodie Leslie Ahlborn as Jonas' mother
- Verena Jost as Jonas' cousin
- Isabella Herbst as Nina's sister
