= Sesede Terziyan =

German actress (born 1981)

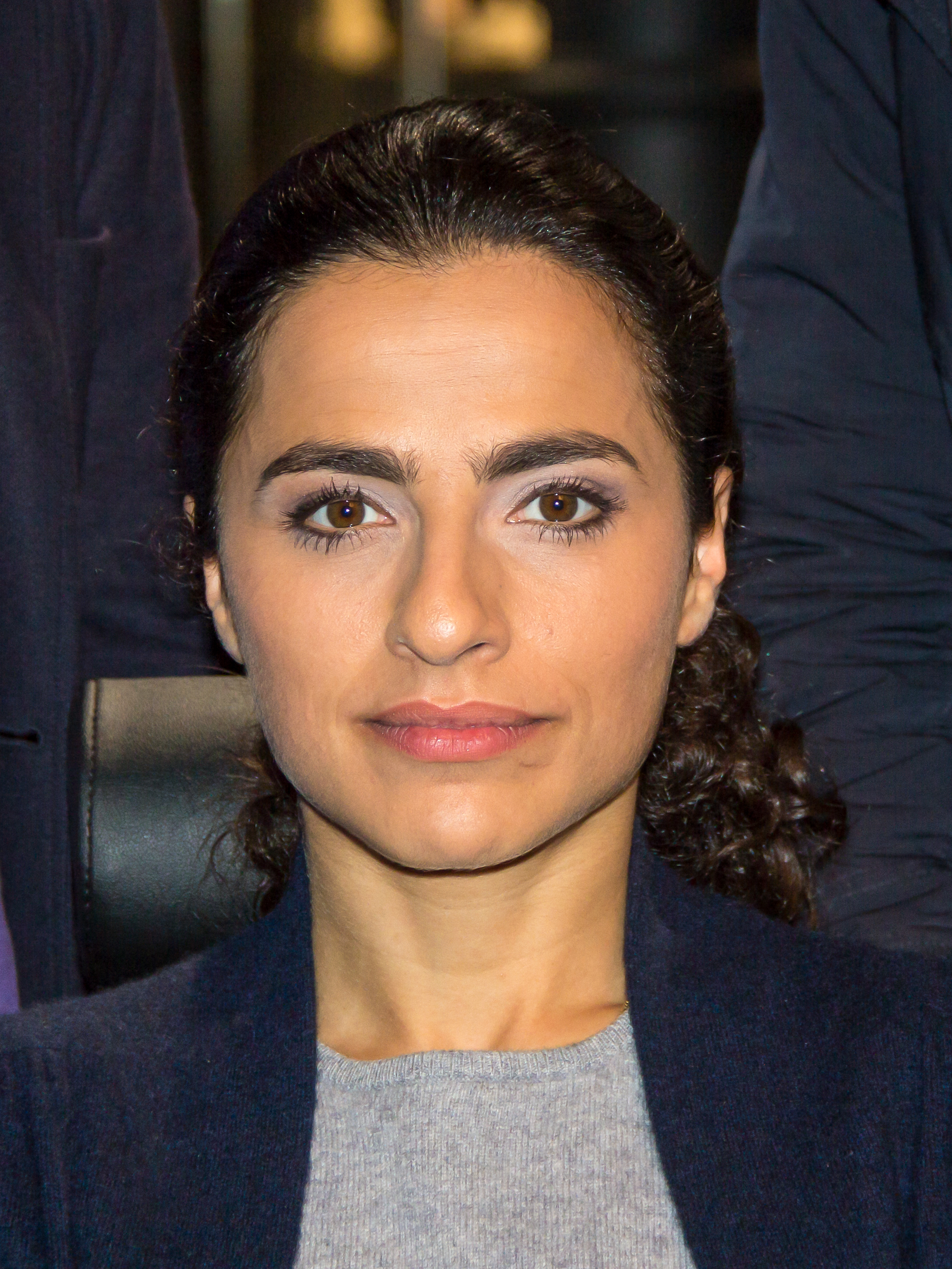
Sesede Terziyan (2014)

Sesede Terziyan (born in 1981) is a German actress based in Berlin.

== Biography ==
Sesede Terziyan was raised by Armenian parents from Yozgat in Turkey, growing up in Lower Saxony and later in Baden-Württemberg. Terziyan has said that she always had a strong desire to express herself, at first through music, but found she could be her true self in the theatre. She trained at the Ernst Busch Academy of Dramatic Arts, and on graduating in 2005, co-founded the independent theatre company Eigenreich, appearing in its opening production, Sarah Kane's 4.48 Psychosis.

Early stage appearances included Death of a Salesman at the Deutsches Theater Berlin and Bloody Homeland at the Maxim Gorki Theatre. She was engaged at Deutsches Theater (Göttingen) in 2006, returning to freelance work in 2008. In 2011, she took the teacher's role in Verrücktes Blut (Mad Blood), a play based on a French film, La Journée de la jupe, at the Ballhaus Naunynstraße in Berlin. The play was developed by Nurkan Erpulat and Jens Hillje through a process of improvisation, co-inspiration and ensemble work. In 2013, she returned to the Maxim Gorki Theater, under the artistic direction of Şermin Langhoff, appearing in several productions including Rewitching Europe and Berlin Oranienplatz. Since season 2026/27 she is no longer a part of the esemble of the Maxim-Gorki-Theatre under the new direct Çalga Ilk.

In 2020, as chief detective Jasmin Sayed, she played the first female chief of a fictionalized Wasserschutzpolizei (river police) in the ARD series, WaPo Berlin.

== Filmography ==
=== Cinema ===
- 2005: Cataract (short)
- 2008: Speed Racer
- 2011: Almanya: Welcome to Germany
- 2013: Lose Your Head
- 2014: A Spicy Kraut
- 2016: Der Kuaför aus der Keupstraße (documentary)
- 2018: 25 km/h
- 2018: Skin Creepers

=== TV ===
- 2006: SOKO Köln
- 2006: Abschnitt 40
- 2007: Vertraute Angst
- 2007: Tatort: Roter Tod
- 2007: Tatort: Wem Ehre gebürt
- 2007–2009: Familie Sonnenfeld (TV series)
- 2008: Tatort: Schatten der Angst
- 2008: Unschuldig
- 2008: In letzter Sekunde
- 2008: Mordkommission Istanbul
- 2010: Ayla
- 2010: SOKO Leipzig
- 2010: Der letzte Bulle (TV series)
- 2010: Der Doc und die Hexe (TV series)
- 2011: SOKO Kitzbühel
- 2013: Tatort: Melinda
- 2014: The Limits of Patience
- 2017: Der Gutachter
- 2017: Der 7. Tag
- 2019: Familie Bundschuh – Wir machen Abitur
- 2020: WaPo Berlin (TV series)
- 2021: Tatort: Die dritte Haut
- 2026: The Trap (miniseries)
