= Carmilla (film) =

2019 film by Emily Harris

- Theatrical release poster
- Directed by: Emily Harris
- Screenplay by: Emily Harris
- Based on: Carmilla by Sheridan Le Fanu
- Produced by: Lizzie Brown; Emily Precious
- Starring: Hannah Rae; Devrim Lingnau; Tobias Menzies; Greg Wise; Jessica Raine
- Cinematography: Michael Wood
- Edited by: Rebecca Lloyd
- Music by: Philip Selway
- Production companies: Tilly Films; Bird Flight Films; Fred Films
- Distributed by: Republic Film Distribution
- Release dates: 28 June 2019 (Edinburgh); 16 October 2020 (United Kingdom)
- Running time: 94 minutes
- Country: United Kingdom
- Language: English
- Box office: $16,791

Carmilla is a 2019 British romantic horror film written and directed by Emily Harris in her feature directorial debut. Based on the 1871 novella of the same name by Sheridan Le Fanu, it stars Hannah Rae, Devrim Lingnau, Tobias Menzies, Jessica Raine and Greg Wise. The film follows a lonely woman preyed upon by the titular vampire.

Carmilla premiered at the Edinburgh International Film Festival on 28 June 2019, and was released in cinemas in the United Kingdom on 16 October 2020.

== Premise ==
Lara lives with her father and her strict governess, Miss Fontaine, in total isolation, and is struggling to find an outlet for her curiosity and burgeoning sexuality. When a carriage crash nearby brings a young woman into the family home to recuperate, Lara is enchanted by Carmilla. The pair strike up a passionate relationship, which strikes fear in the heart of Miss Fontaine, and a complex triangle emerges between the three women.

== Cast ==
- Hannah Rae as Lara
- Devrim Lingnau as Carmilla
- Jessica Raine as Miss Fontaine
- Tobias Menzies as The Doctor
- Greg Wise as Mr. Bauer
- Scott Silven as The Magician
- Daniel Tuite as Paul the Stableman
- Lorna Gayle as Margaret

== Production ==
On 17 August 2017, Screen Daily reported that Jessica Raine and Tobias Menzies had been cast in the film, joining Hannah Rae, Devrim Lingnau, and illusionist Scott Silven in the production.

Principal photography began in East Sussex on 11 September 2017.

== Release ==
Carmilla had its world premiere at the Edinburgh International Film Festival on 28 June 2019. The film was originally set to be released in the United Kingdom on 3 April 2020 by Republic Film Distribution, but it was postponed due to the COVID-19 pandemic; it was ultimately released in cinemas on 16 October 2020 and on video on demand on 19 October. In May 2020, Film Movement acquired US distribution rights to the film and released it in virtual cinemas on 17 July 2020.
