= The Empress (TV series) =

German historical drama series (2022–2026)

- Release poster
- Genre: Historical drama; Romance
- Created by: Katharina Eyssen
- Written by: Katharina Eyssen; Bernd Lange; Janna Maria Nandzik
- Directed by: Katrin Gebbe; Florian Cossen
- Starring: Devrim Lingnau; Philip Froissant
- Composers: Johannes Lehniger; Lisa Morgenstern; Sebastian Damerius
- Country of origin: Germany
- Original language: German
- No. of seasons: 3
- No. of episodes: 18

Production
- Executive producers: Jochen Laube; Fabian Maubach
- Production location: Germany
- Cinematography: Christian Almesberger; Christopher Aoun
- Running time: 51–61 minutes
- Production companies: Netflix; Sommerhaus Serien; Inferno Pictures

Original release
- Network: Netflix
- Release: 29 September 2022 – 12 November 2026

The Empress (German: Die Kaiserin) is a German historical drama television series based on the life of Empress Elisabeth of Austria, portrayed by Devrim Lingnau, with Philip Froissant as Franz Joseph I of Austria.

The first season was released on Netflix on 29 September 2022, and the second one premiered on 22 November 2024. The third and final season premiered on 12 November 2026. The Empress won Best Drama Series at the 51st International Emmy Awards.

== Premise ==
16-year-old Bavarian Duchess Elisabeth "Sisi" von Wittelsbach falls in love with Emperor Franz Joseph I of Austria, the intended fiancé of her older sister, Duchess Helene, and they marry. Arriving in Vienna, Sisi finds herself navigating the complexity of court politics and her husband's scheming family. Her mother-in-law, Archduchess Sophie, who is also her aunt, antagonises her almost immediately. Maximilian, Franz Joseph's younger brother, tries to outshine his brother and prove that he is more worthy to rule.

== Cast ==
Introduced in the first season

- Devrim Lingnau as Elisabeth "Sisi" von Wittelsbach, Duchess in Bavaria turned Empress of Austria
- Philip Froissant as Franz Joseph I of Austria
- Melika Foroutan as Sophie, Archduchess of Austria, Franz Joseph's mother and Elisabeth's aunt turned mother-in-law. Foroutan also portrays Maria Anna, Dowager Queen of Saxony, Sophie's twin sister, in season 3.
- Johannes Nussbaum as Archduke Maximilian, Franz Joseph's younger brother
- Elisa Schlott as Duchess Helene "Néné" in Bavaria, Elisabeth's older sister (season 1)
- Jördis Triebel as Ludovika, Duchess in Bavaria, Elisabeth's mother
- Almila Bagriacik as Ava, a revolutionary posing as Countess Leontine von Apafi
- Hanna Hilsdorf as Countess Amalia von Salm-Reifferscheidt, a lady-in-waiting who has dedicated her life to the Austrian empire (season 1)
- Runa Greiner as Countess Charlotte von Stubenberg, a naïve lady-in-waiting who later becomes the matron of the empress's maid service
- Svenja Jung as Countess Louise Gundemann (later Baroness von Sina), Franz Joseph's former lover
- Andreas Döhler as Maximilian, Duke in Bavaria, Elisabeth's father
- Wiebke Puls as Countess Sophie Esterházy, matron of the empress's maid service and Sophie's confidant (season 1)
- Michael Fuith as Franz Karl, Archduke of Austria, Sophie's husband and Franz Joseph's supposed father, who becomes Elisabeth's father-in-law (season 1)
- Felix Nölle as Archduke Ludwig Viktor "Luziwuzi" of Austria, Franz Joseph's younger brother
- Martin Butzke as Gustav, Prince of Vasa, Sophie's former lover, who claims to be Franz Joseph's birth father (season 1)
- Alexander Finkenwirth as Baron Alexander von Bach, Franz Joseph's interior minister and conservative advisor
- Leopold Hornung as Count Karl Ferdinand von Buol, the foreign minister and a militaristic advisor
- Patrick Rapold as the Hungarian composer Franz Liszt (season 1)
- August Schmölzer as Joseph Othmar von Rauscher, Prince-Archbishop of Vienna and cardinal
- Raymond Tarabay as François-Adolphe De Bourqueney, French ambassador (season 1)
- Eric Bouwer as Dr. Fritsch, a maternity doctor
- Irene Della Casa as Baronesse Francesca, Archduke Maximilian's lover at the start of the season (season 1)
- Rauand Taleb as Theo, Emperor Franz Joseph's valet
- Erol Nowak as Johann Baron Kempen von Fichtenstamm, the inspector general of the police (season 1)
- Noëmi Emily Krausz as Countess Margarete von Lamberg, Archduchess Sophie's lady-in-waiting and closest confidant
- Andreas Bongard as the Austrian composer Johann Strauss (season 1)
- Vladimir Korneev as Alexander Nikolayevich, Grand Duke of Russia, son of Tsar Nicholas I (season 1)
- Elzemarieke De Vos as Maria Alexandrovna, Grand Duchess of Russia, Alexander's wife (season 1)

Introduced in the second season

- Josephine Thiesen as Princess Charlotte Marie of Belgium, Archduke Maximilian's wife
- Marlene Spakarowski as Archduchess Sophie "Fienchen" of Austria, Franz Joseph and Elisabeth's firstborn
- Carla Hütterman as Countess Pauline von Bellegarde, Empress Elisabeth's lady-in-waiting
- Christophe Favre as Emperor Napoleon III
- Jérôme Pouly as Camillo Benso, Count of Cavour, Prime Minister of the Kingdom of Sardinia-Piedmont
- Cornelius Schwalm as Dr. Johann Seeburger, Elisabeth's physician, who is constantly at odds with her
- Alexander Beyer as Maximilian, Duke in Bavaria, Elisabeth's father (season 2)
- Lena Geiseler as Duchess Maria Sophie "Mimi" in Bavaria, Elisabeth's younger sister
- Mina Christ as Countess Gabriele von Metternich-Zichy, Princess Charlotte's lady-in-waiting
- Leonie Euler as Baroness Caroline von Bransner, Princess Charlotte's lady-in-waiting
- Rainer Haustein as Count Karl Ludwig von Grünne, Franz Joseph's chief military advisor
- Alberto Vecchiato as Adolfo Tadini, an Italian revolutionary disguised as a dignitary
- Matthias Matschke as Count Michael von Apafi, the father of the real Leontine von Apafi
- Bernd Birkhahn as Field Marshal Josef Radetzky, Viceroy of Lombardy-Venetia prior to Archduke Maximilian
- Christian Bayer as General Ferenc József Gyulay, commander of the Austrian forces in Lombardy-Venetia
- Asena Uzun as Duchess Sophie Charlotte in Bavaria, Elisabeth's youngest sister
- Levi Oskar as Duke Maximillian Emanuel "Mapperl" in Bavaria, Elisabeth's youngest brother
- Lorenzo Motta as Gino Tadini, Adolfo's younger brother and an ardent Italian revolutionary
- Fabiana Chiorri as Giulia, Gino's girlfriend and fellow revolutionary
- Marcello De Nardo as Count Giuseppe Marino, the head of the Lombardo-Venetian delegation

Introduced in the third season

== Episodes ==
Series	Episodes	Originally released
1	6	29 September 2022
2	6	22 November 2024
3	6	12 November 2026

=== Season 1 (2022) ===
No. overall	No. in season	Title	Directed by	Written by	Original release date
1	1	"One's Place in the World"	Florian Cossen and Katrin Gebbe	Katharina Eyssen, Bernd Lange, and Janna Maria Nandzik	29 September 2022
Franz has recently taken over as a young emperor following the Revolutions of 1848 in the Austrian Empire. In 1853, there is an assassination attempt against his life. That same year, Elisabeth (Sisi) and Helene travel with their mother, Ludovika, to meet the 23-year-old Franz, who is expected to ask for Helene's hand. Franz's mother and Elisabeth's aunt, Archduchess Sophie, is of the opinion that her son's union with the Bayern Helene will validate Austria's claim to the German states. Meanwhile, Nicholas I of Russia seeks an alliance with Austria against the Ottoman Empire. Franz's brothers Maximilian and Ludwig (Luziwuzi) are also present. Franz meets Elisabeth and admires her outspokenness. However, she repulses his advances, as she does not want to betray her sister. During his birthday party the next day, he stuns everyone by deciding to marry Elisabeth. She accepts, as she has grown fond of Franz. Helene is upset at Elisabeth.
2	2	"The Arrival"	Florian Cossen and Katrin Gebbe	Katharina Eyssen, Bernd Lange, and Janna Maria Nandzik	29 September 2022
Elisabeth arrives in Vienna along with her family for the wedding, though her father tells her not to fully trust Sophie. Esterházy, Sophie's confidant, introduces her to the maids, including Amalia, Leontine, and Charlotte. She also teaches her palace etiquettes, but Elisabeth feels her freedom is diminished. During the war council, Franz decides that he does not want the House of Habsburg to join either side in the Crimean War. It is revealed that Leontine is part of the revolution and wants to kill the royal family. Johann Strauss II helps Elisabeth and Franz during their waltz rehearsal, and Swedish Prince Gustav, Sophie's old lover, privately asks her whether he is Franz's father. Franz has a secret meeting with Mr. Stephenson, an engineer, to build a major railway, connecting Vienna to the rest of the world to bring prosperity and peace to his people. On the night before the wedding, Elisabeth goes with her maids to a soiree organised by Maximilian, Franz's brother. Maximilian tries to kiss Elisabeth, but she rejects him. The next day, Elisabeth gets an anxiety attack before her wedding. Helene helps her manage it, and they bond.
3	3	"The Wedding"	Florian Cossen and Katrin Gebbe	Katharina Eyssen, Bernd Lange, and Janna Maria Nandzik	29 September 2022
Elisabeth marries Franz and is crowned empress. Meanwhile, Amalia is suspicious of Leontine because of her mysterious background and unsettling demeanor. Franz's old lover, Louise, is also present. The Russians have amassed large numbers at Austria's eastern fronts, upsetting the political situation; Franz asks Maximilian to talk to the French ambassador for support against Russia. Franz meets with businessmen for loans for the railway, but they are more interested in investing in troops. After a confrontation with her overbearing mother and drunk father, Elisabeth asks them to leave the palace in the morning. Elisabeth has a confrontation with Louise as well. Later, Baron Sina, Louise's partner, provides the funds for the railway to Franz. That night, Franz comes clean about Louise, and Elisabeth is insecure about people perceiving her as being silly. They consummate their marriage.
4	4	"The Hunt"	Florian Cossen and Katrin Gebbe	Katharina Eyssen, Bernd Lange, and Janna Maria Nandzik	29 September 2022
After the honeymoon, Esterházy feeds raw eggs and the placenta of a pregnant woman to Elisabeth to get her pregnant, on Sophie's instructions. Sophie and the council push for military action, but instead, Franz brings in Grand Duke Alexander of Russia, Nicholas' son, to make peace with Russia, which Sophie does not approve, but Elisabeth does. Elisabeth tries to mend the relationship with Sophie, who reciprocates this but tells Elisabeth that a son should be her highest priority. After talking with the French ambassador, Max goes behind Franz's back and tries to become the new emperor of Austria, with French support. During a hunting trip, Elisabeth upsets Alexander, who thinks that Franz is offering peace only to expand into the Russian Empire as they fight France, and he rejects Franz's plan. Franz blames Elisabeth, and she later gets drunk with Maximilian, which results in a reprimand from Franz, who mistrusts Maximilian. Egon, Leontine's commoner friend, suspects Leontine's (whose real name is Ava) loyalties; she says that she was wrong about the Empress and the Emperor. Egon asks her to choose: the royalty who will die, or the cause that will rise.
5	5	"The Shoes"	Florian Cossen and Katrin Gebbe	Katharina Eyssen, Bernd Lange, and Janna Maria Nandzik	29 September 2022
Elisabeth and Leontine bond over imitating bird song at night, while Franz sends his soldiers to the Austrian borders to protect from Russian invasion. Baron Sina cancels the agreement, because the emperor sent sizeble troops to the border. Elisabeth goes to the city with Esterházy and Luziwuzi, but her well-intended gesture at a foundry backfires and results in Luziwuzi being injured. Maximilian realises that to get the throne, he needs support from three parties: the army, the Catholic Church, and Sophie. Franz asks Louise to convince Sina to rethink his decision and confronts Elisabeth about ruining the support of the people. Sophie warns Esterházy of dire consequences if Elisabeth does not get pregnant soon. Amalia figures out Leontine's identity using Leontine's old photos. Elisabeth cannot sleep and strolls downstairs to find Maximilian returning from a party in the city, and he offers to go to Prague with her through a secret tunnel and run away from the royal mess.
6	6	"The God Who Us Has Freedom Sent"	Florian Cossen and Katrin Gebbe	Katharina Eyssen, Bernd Lange, and Janna Maria Nandzik	29 September 2022
Elisabeth spends her time partying with Maximilian, angry at Franz for not supporting her at the foundry incident, while Franz is desperate to reconcile with her. Amalia tells Elisabeth about Leontine, but her claims are dismissed. Leontine tells Egon to come through the unguarded door to the east after sunset, where he will find a knife; however it is a ruse. Sophie presents Elisabeth a choice: either to go back to Bavaria and annul the wedding with Franz, or to stay and play by their rules, which includes reconciling with Franz. Sophie also fires Esterházy for failing her orders and promotes Margarete over her. Maximilian talks to Sophie about the throne. While she does not approve of the idea, she also does not disapprove of it, but Franz gets angry and asks Maximilian to leave. Elisabeth realises she is pregnant, but, after a fight with Franz, decides to go back to Bavaria. Revolutionaries approach the palace, and Franz orders the soldiers to shoot and kill them, including Egon. Amalia tells Charlotte about Leontine, who tells Leontine herself. Enraged, Leontine pushes Amalia over the railing, killing her, which is witnessed by Charlotte. Elisabeth, about to leave, sees the people, opens the gate, and walks to them. She tells them that she is with child and shakes their hands and hugs them in a sign of royal defiance, which brings her closer to the people. Maximilian is apprehended on Franz's orders.

=== Season 2 (2024) ===
No. overall	No. in season	Title	Directed by	Written by	Original release date
7	1	"An Heir to the Throne"	Barbara Ott	Katharina Eyssen	22 November 2024
By 1856, Elisabeth has given birth to a girl, Sophie (Fienchen), and is heavily pregnant with her second child. Determined to restore the relationship between herself and her subjects, she organises a grand event to host foreign delegates. During the ceremony, Adolfo of Lombardy-Venetia presents a cow's tongue to symbolise his region's desire for independence. He is subsequently gunned down and killed. Afterward, Minister Boul informs Franz that the Kingdom of Piedmont has been trying to unite all Italian-speaking regions and end their allegiance to Austria. Maximilian has been in exile and is consumed by depression, and Leontine refuses to formalise the romantic relationship between her and the minister Alexander because of her fabricated identity. The same night, Elisabeth unexpectedly goes into labour and delivers another daughter prematurely. The birth is fraught with complications, and Elisabeth becomes unconscious.
8	2	"The Dream"	Maximilian Erlenwein	Katharina Eyssen, Elena von Saucken	22 November 2024
A week later, Elisabeth remains unconscious and has continuous dreams of Adolfo. Concerned for the stability of Europe, Franz summons Maximilian from exile and entrusts him with a crucial mission: negotiate peace with Napoleon III. Maximilian subsequently sets off for France and encounters Princess Charlotte Marie of Belgium when her train unexpectedly breaks down. The two form a deep connection and fall in love over the course of their shared travels. Napoleon promises to consider Franz's proposal but secretly harbours ulterior motives. Back in Austria, Elisabeth finally awakens and confides in Franz about her recurring dreams; Franz dismisses them as meaningless. Meanwhile, Sophie emphasises the importance of having male heirs to strengthen Franz's claim to the throne. Elisabeth has another dream of Adolfo playing with Fienchen and almost drowning, but Sophie covers up the incident in return for Elisabeth taking sedatives to help her recover. Sophie also steps in to care for both Fienchen and the newborn, whom Franz names Gisela.
9	3	"A Letter from the Empress"	Maximilian Erlenwein	Katharina Eyssen, Francis Pfitzner	22 November 2024
Elisabeth and Franz embark on a royal tour across the empire, but tensions arise when they arrive in Milan. The locals drop their flags and flowers in silent protest, which startles Elisabeth and angers Franz. At the viceroy's residence in Milan, Maximilian introduces Princess Marie to Franz and Elisabeth. During dinner, Elisabeth and Maximilian advocate for granting the people of Milan greater freedoms, such as the right to speak their own language and access education, but Franz vehemently opposes the idea. The following morning, Elisabeth and Franz secretly visit Adolfo's family and pose as officials sent by the empress. They listen to the family's grievances and promise to relay their concerns to the empress. The visit profoundly impacts Franz and gives him a new perspective. Later, Franz forgives Maximilian, appoints him as the new Viceroy of Milan, and grants his blessing for Maximilian's marriage to Marie. Motivated by a conversation with Elisabeth, Leontine finally accepts Alexander's proposal. Meanwhile, Sophie bonds with Fienchen, and the news of Maximilian's appointment as Viceroy of Lombardy-Venetia reaches Napoleon and leaves him deeply displeased.
10	4	"The Stars During the Day"	Barbara Ott	Katharina Eyssen, Elena von Saucken	22 November 2024
In 1857, Elisabeth and Franz travel to Hungary with Fienchen and Gisela for a visit, despite Sophie's request not to take the children. While they are gone, Sophie becomes deeply troubled by her youngest son Ludwig's growing infatuation with a young baron. Seeking to put an end to it, she enlists the help of the cardinal, who forces "Luziwuzi" to kneel in penance. Meanwhile, Charlotte discovers that Leontine is pregnant. Alexander receives an unexpected visit from the real Leontine's father, who reveals the truth about her identity. Confronting Leontine, Alexander issues her an ultimatum to leave the palace discreetly by the following morning; she complies. Back in Hungary, Fienchen begins suffering from severe stomach pain, vomiting, and diarrhoea. A doctor diagnoses her with typhoid fever, and her condition deteriorates overnight. By morning, she passes away, and the family is left in deep mourning.
11	5	"The Forest Inside Us"	Barbara Ott	Katharina Eyssen	22 November 2024
At Fienchen's funeral, a grieving Elisabeth lashes out at Franz before retreating to her childhood home in Bavaria to grieve. Franz, consumed by his own sorrow, begins to make impulsive decisions, appointing Buol to oversee military operations in Milan, demoting Maximilian, and promoting Colonel Gyulai in his place. Meanwhile, Maximilian and Marie are troubled by their inability to conceive. A visit to the doctor reveals that Maximilian may have become infertile from past sexually transmitted infections. Elisabeth receives news that her younger sister, Maria (Mimi), is set to marry the following year, and her elder sister, Helene, has fallen in love with a man of modest means, and their cousin King Maximilian II of Bavaria has refused to grant his blessing to the union. Seeking solace, Elisabeth visits her father, who encourages her to rediscover her strength and purpose. The following morning, Elisabeth's mother finally breaks through her daughter's despair, helping her to forgive herself and find the courage to move forward. Reuniting with Franz, Elisabeth persuades her uncle to approve Helene's marriage. Meanwhile, Napoleon schemes to manipulate Franz into declaring war on Piedmont and further escalates tensions in the empire.
12	6	"All We Can Do"	Maximilian Erlenwein	Katharina Eyssen, Matthias Börner	22 November 2024
By 1858, Elisabeth has given birth to a son, Rudolf, and learns from Charlotte that Leontine was pregnant when she left; she informs Alexander. Meanwhile, Franz and Sophie devise a plan to marry off Mimi to the Prince Francis of Sicily to solidify a vital political alliance. Elisabeth initially opposes the idea, because Mimi is not menstruating, but Sophie convinces her of the importance of the nuptials for stability. Franz soon discovers that Napoleon has been covertly supplying military weapons to the rebels in Milan, and the gravity of the situation dawns on him, since he is now at war with France as well. In response, he takes swift action: he fires ministers Gyulai and Buol and demotes Maximilian from his position as viceroy. Alexander, disillusioned, resigns from his duties and sets off in search of Leontine. As the conflict escalates, with Napoleon ordering the massacre of over 6,000 Austrian soldiers, Elisabeth urges Mimi to accept the political marriage and hopes that it will inspire hope in the people. Franz, determined to lead by example, decides to join the soldiers on the front lines. Initially shocked by his decision, Elisabeth ultimately supports him in his resolve. Tensions rise between Franz and Maximilian, culminating in a fierce argument. Maximilian and Marie, unable to accept the changes, leave the palace for good. A heartbroken and angry Sophie blames Elisabeth for Franz's decision to go to war, but Elisabeth comforts her and tells her that the best they can do is hope.

=== Season 3 (2026) ===
No. overall	No. in season	Title	Directed by	Written by	Original release date
13	1	"The Return"	Florian Cossen and Julia Langhof	Katharina Eyssen and Elena von Saucken	12 November 2026
In 1859, Austria is defeated in the war, and Franz is forced to reach an armistice with Napoleon. In the palace, Elisabeth busies herself with taking care of the women and children, and she is happy to hear that Franz is returning, though Sophie is concerned about the defeat. Franz arrives and calls a family meeting, where he announces that he is appointing a new cabinet and introduces Prince Konstantin of Hohenlohe as his adjutant. Though Franz bonds with their children, he is more hesitant with Elisabeth and rough-handles her. Elisabeth's ladies-in-waiting welcome Ida, a Hungarian, as a new member of Elisabeth's court. Franz suffers post-traumatic stress disorder, unable to sleep and constantly remembering his experience in combat. Relations between Franz and Elisabeth get more tense, and they get into a heated argument. Maximilian senses Franz is struggling and brings him to one of his friend's masked parties, where he meets a servant, Terese. He ends up sleeping with her, which is witnessed by Margarete, one of Sophie's ladies-in-waiting, who passes the information to Elisabeth's ladies-in-waiting; Elisabeth overhears this. She confronts Franz, who admits the truth, but he accuses her of pitying him due to his defeat in the war. Elisabeth struggles to breathe. Doctor Fritsch diagnoses the problem as a complex lung condition and advises her to travel to a warmer place for the summer. Franz also claims some distance would do them good, and Elisabeth decides to leave.
14	2	"The Island"	Florian Cossen and Julia Langhof	Katharina Eyssen and Elena von Saucken	12 November 2026
Elisabeth arrives in Corfu with her ladies-in-waiting, Charlotte and Pauline, along with Ida and Margarete, who was fired by Sophie after failing to keep Franz's affair a secret; she feels better in the warm climate. Sophie sends her letters claiming to be from Franz, though Margarete discovers the truth, and Elisabeth still has not forgiven Franz. Meanwhile, in Vienna, during negotiations concerning the Italian reunification, they demand Venetia in addition to Lombardy, while warning Franz of the consequences if Prussia tries to take advantage of Austria. Eventually, the representative promises support if Austria faces a war with Prussia, and the agreement moves forward. Charlotte and Doctor Fritsch realize their attraction to each other in Corfu; meanwhile, Franz continues his affair with Terese. One evening, Elisabeth and her ladies consume opium and meet a few British naval officers. The situation becomes uncomfortable when Pauline, under the influence of the drug, allows an officer to kiss her. Elisabeth realizes she is responsible for putting her ladies in this situation, apologizes to them, and decides to go back to Vienna, though Margarete decides to stay back. Meanwhile, Sophie threatens Terese and has her sent away; she also persuades Franz to reconcile with Elisabeth and helps him realize he still loves her. Elisabeth and her ladies reach Venice, on the way to Vienna, where she meets Gyula Andrássy, a Hungarian revolutionary leader, and an opponent of Franz.
15	3	"To Family"	Florian Cossen and Julia Langhof	Katharina Eyssen and Elena von Saucken	12 November 2026
Elisabeth and Andrássy agree to talk more about Hungary. She returns to Vienna and is welcomed warmly by Franz and their children. She decides to organize Christmas donations for hospitals, children's homes, and workhouses. Franz admits that he saw Terese twice more while she was away but promises that it has ended; they talk about their experiences in the war and Corfu, and reconcile. She receives a letter from Andrássy through Ida, asking for an audience regarding Hungary's future. Though the household consider Andrássy Austria's enemy for his revolutionary past and hatred of Franz, Elisabeth decides to think about the audience. Maximilian and Marie arrive and inform her that Napoleon has offered Maximilian the Crown of Mexico. Franz and Sophie are concerned this will cause a fracture of the Habsburg family, and Sophie proposes that Maximilian renounce his claims to Austria-Hungary if he is to become the emperor of Mexico, though Maximilian refuses to sign. Eventually, Franz offers Maximilian a compromise and says that if he renounces his claims to Austria-Hungary now, and in future loses Mexico, he will get back his claims, which Maximilian accepts. Elisabeth meets with Andrássy; they give in to their mutual attraction and kiss. Later, she tells Ida she doesn't want to see Andrássy again, though she will continue her support for Hungary. Meanwhile, Terese realizes she is pregnant and informs Prince Konstantin, who in turn tells Franz.
16	4	"Out onto the Open Sea"	Florian Cossen and Julia Langhof	Katharina Eyssen and Elena von Saucken	12 November 2026
Franz spends time with Terese and their twin sons, though he claims to Elisabeth he is concerned about diplomatic matters. Elisabeth also wants to have her ideas about Hungary presented to Franz's cabinet, though Franz repeatedly postpones the discussion. King Wilhelm of Prussia and his prime minister, Otto von Bismarck, arrive for diplomatic talks with Austria. Sophie's twin sister, Anna, arrives, though her relationship with Sophie is not happy. Meanwhile, Doctor Fritsch proposes to Charlotte, and with Elisabeth's support, she accepts. Bismarck tries to pressure Austria into giving back both Schleswig and Holstein, under Austrian occupation, but he reaches a compromise with Franz to take back only Schleswig. Franz admits to Elisabeth that Terese has given birth to his children, and she is furious. Meanwhile, in Prussia, Bismarck prepares for war with Austria. Franz realizes that if Hungary supports Prussia, Austria could face a serious problem, and he asks Elisabeth to travel to Hungary and gain the support of the Hungarians. Elisabeth addresses the cabinet and asks for political recognition and greater autonomy for Hungary. She also receives two portraits from the painter Winterhalter.
17	5	"In Another Life"	Florian Cossen and Julia Langhof	Katharina Eyssen and Elena von Saucken	12 November 2026
Elisabeth arrives in Buda and meets with Ferenc Deák, Kálmán Tisza, József Eötvös, and Count Andrássy, the Hungarian political leaders. Meanwhile, in Mexico, Maximilian and Marie present a child they adopted as their son, though Maximilian soon gives the child back to its mother. Marie believes that they need an heir to establish the legitimacy of their monarchy, though Maximilian suggests that they could have a child through another man. Though Marie is initially shocked, she accepts it for their future and chooses their Belgian officer, Smissen. Though Smissen is also hesitant at first, Marie convinces him, and they sleep together with Maximilian's approval. Elisabeth promises freedom for Hungary and meets Andrássy the next day at his private residence, where they sleep together. Though Andrássy challenges Elisabeth for her loyalty to Franz, she defends him and tells him he was young. Andrássy confesses to Elisabeth that he has fallen in love with her. Meanwhile, Prussia attacks Austria, defeats it, and claims several more Austrian territories, which Franz is forced to cede. Elisabeth and Andrássy stop their affair, but Sophie discovers the truth. Franz decides to accept Hungary's demands to stop another war, and Sophie informs him of Elisabeth's affair, to his shock.
18	6	"Until We Meet Again"	Florian Cossen and Julia Langhof	Katharina Eyssen and Elena von Saucken	12 November 2026
Elisabeth returns to Vienna, and Franz immediately confronts her about the affair. She admits the truth, and Franz decides not to give in to Hungary's demands. He confines Elisabeth to her rooms and prohibits her from seeing their children without supervision; Elisabeth is devastated by this. In Mexico, Napoleon starts withdrawing his troops to prepare for war with Prussia, which leads to Maximilian and Marie losing support in favour of Benito Juárez, who has support from the United States. A pregnant Marie travels to Vienna to gain support for Maximilian. Sophie asks Franz to send soldiers to Maximilian to prevent another defeat for their family, but Franz refuses and sends him a ship to ask him to abdicate and come back to Vienna. Franz gives permission for Elisabeth to be with Andrássy if she wants to. However, she chooses to stay with Franz, and they reconcile. Franz agrees to grant Hungary its own parliament and constitution and makes his peace with Andrássy. They are crowned king and queen of Hungary, with Andrássy as prime minister. Sophie tries to help Maximilian but fails. Maximilian is captured and executed by firing squad in Mexico by Juárez. Elisabeth realizes she is pregnant again and informs Franz, to his joy. In 1916, an elderly Franz, surrounded by his adult daughters Gisela and Valerie, dies while reading the letters he and Elisabeth had exchanged over the years and looking at the two portraits of Elisabeth that Winterhalter had created. The series ends with the choices Elisabeth made in her life and the way she found her freedom within the empire.

== Production ==
=== Development ===
In December 2020, Netflix announced it would start producing a six-part series with the working title The Empress, based on the life of the Austrian empress Elisabeth of Bavaria (nicknamed Sisi). It would be directed by Katrin Gebbe and Florian Cossen, with Bernd Lange and Janna Maria Nandzik writing. Devrim Lingnau and Philip Froissant were announced in the lead roles.

=== Filming ===
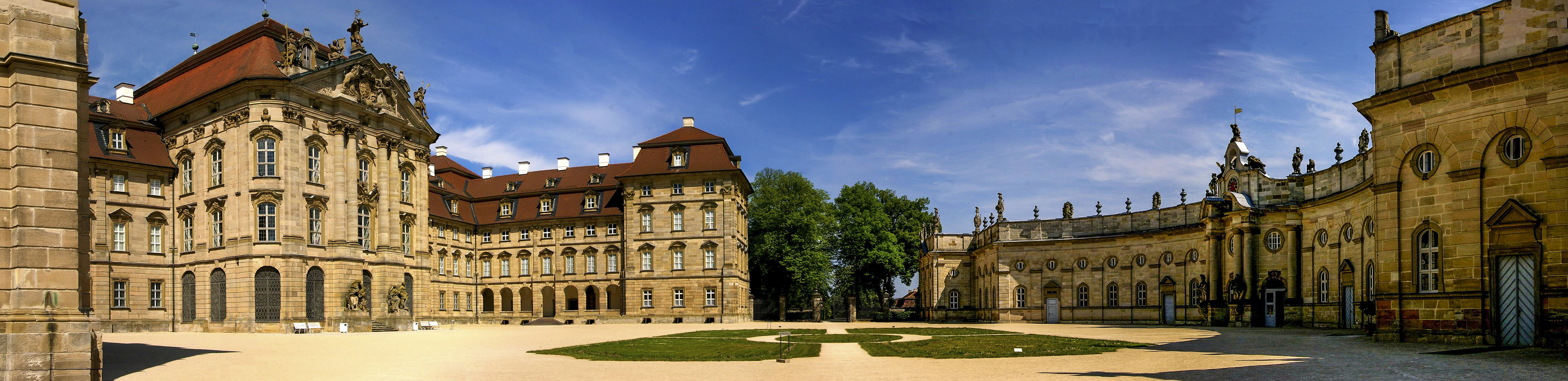
Exteriors were filmed at Schloss Weißenstein, to represent Schönbrunn Palace.

Filming for the first season began in August 2021 and was completed in January 2022. The series was filmed in German and subsequently dubbed into 14 languages, including English. Subtitles were provided in 32 languages.

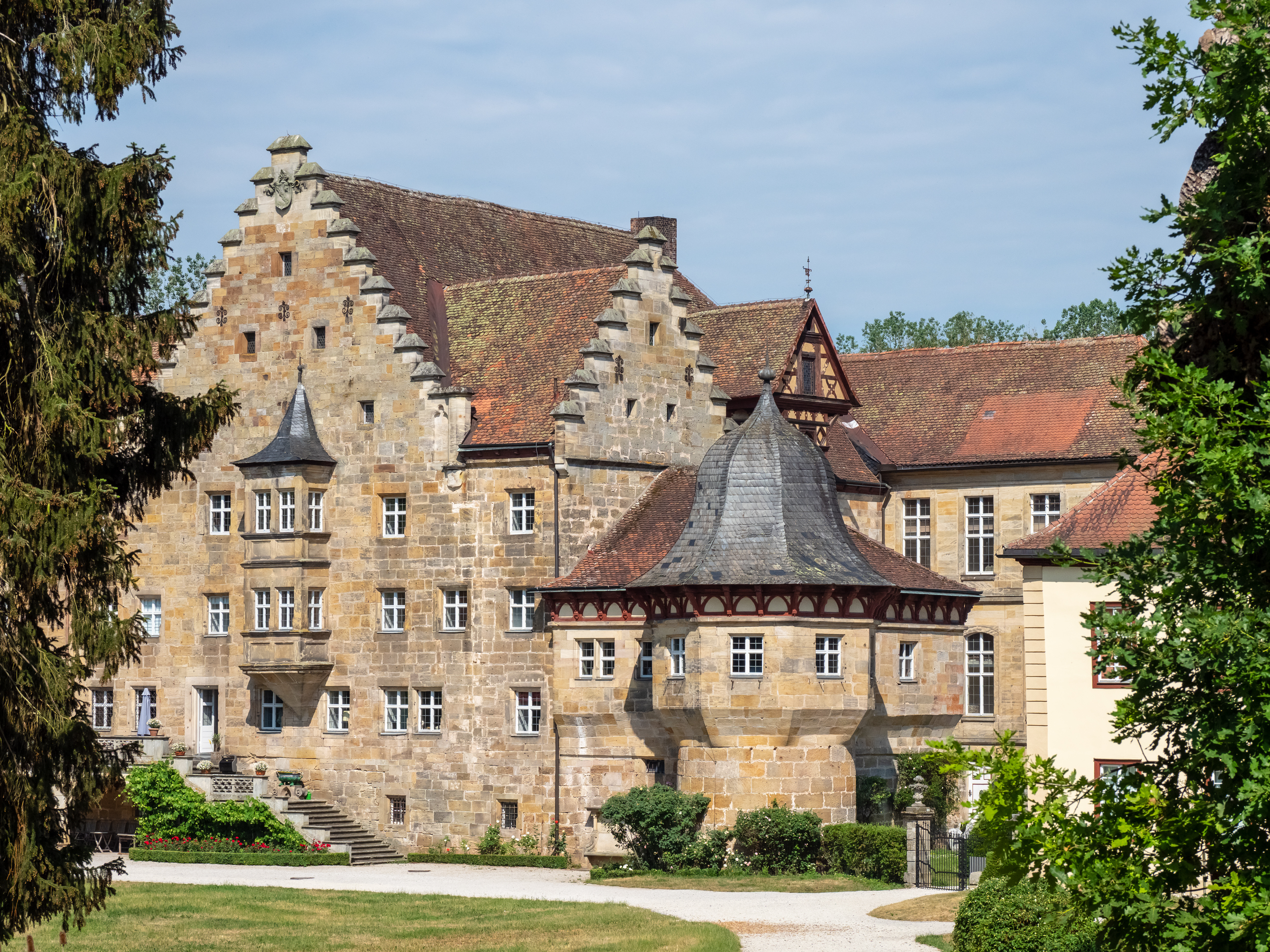
Eyrichshof Castle exteriors were used to represent young Sisi's summer home.

The storyline takes place primarily in Vienna, though parts of the first episode are set in Bavaria, where the young Elisabeth was living when she met the emperor. Nonetheless, exterior filming was completed in Germany, primarily in Bavaria. For studio work, the production moved to Babelsberg Studio in Potsdam. Location shooting was completed in cities such as Bayreuth, Stein, Bamberg, Dinkelsbühl, Eckersdorf, and Aidhausen. Several historical locations were used, including Schloss Weißenstein in Pommersfelden, which stood in for Schönbrunn Palace. Exterior scenes of Sisi's childhood home were filmed at Eyrichshof Castle near Ebern, although the family's summer home was actually the nearby Possenhofen Castle.

After Netflix renewed the series, filming for the second season began in Prague, Czechia, by September 2023. Additional filming was done in Zagreb, Croatia.

Production on the third season began in Prague in September 2025. Production ended in January 2026, and the season was released on 12 November.

== Soundtrack ==
=== Season 1 ===
The Empress (Soundtrack from the Netflix Series)

Soundtrack album by Johannes Lehniger, Lisa Morgenstern, and Sebastian Damerius
- Released: 30 September 2022
- Genre: Soundtrack
- Length: 48:10
- Label: Netflix

Track listing
No.	Title	Length
1.	"The Empress Main Title"	0:48
2.	"Runaway"	1:55
3.	"Carriage Ride"	1:04
4.	"Emperor Couple"	1:46
5.	"Mother's Voice"	0:59
6.	"Elisabeth or No Other"	1:51
7.	"Diadem"	1:37
8.	"Arrival Vienna"	4:18
9.	"So Many Shoes"	1:00
10.	"Distress"	2:40
11.	"Golden Glass"	5:03
12.	"The Wedding"	4:22
13.	"To the Ballroom"	1:42
14.	"White Curtains"	1:06
15.	"Ladies of the Court"	1:58
16.	"I Love Only You"	2:43
17.	"Burden of the Crown"	2:43
18.	"Revealing Secrets"	2:22
19.	"That Is Not You, Elisabeth"	1:21
20.	"Betrayal Within"	1:26
21.	"For the People"	2:27
22.	"Open the Gate"	2:49
Total length:		48:10

=== Season 2 ===
The Empress: II (Soundtrack from the Netflix Series)

Soundtrack album by Johannes Lehniger, Lisa Morgenstern, and Sebastian Damerius
- Released: 22 November 2024
- Genre: Soundtrack
- Length: 59:10
- Label: Netflix

Track listing
No.	Title	Length
1.	"Years After the Wedding"	2:39
2.	"Rules of the Court"	1:51
3.	"It's a Girl"	1:30
4.	"Curiosity"	2:27
5.	"Ado's Last Journey"	2:28
6.	"Glorious Scoundrel"	1:44
7.	"Imperial Couple"	2:52
8.	"Love and Lies"	2:56
9.	"Pouvoir"	1:27
10.	"Dark Fading Waves"	1:24
11.	"Little Kaiserin"	2:29
12.	"The Emperor's Despair I"	1:15
13.	"Swallow, Lend Me Your Wings"	2:08
14.	"On the Edge"	2:29
15.	"Beloved Rival"	2:02
16.	"Little Kaiser"	2:26
17.	"A Mother's Duty"	2:05
18.	"Napoleon's Puppets"	1:53
19.	"Grief"	2:33
20.	"The Emperor's Despair II"	2:31
21.	"A Doubting Mind"	2:05
22.	"Im Abendrot – Franz Schubert"	3:01
23.	"Full Moon Forest"	2:41
24.	"Burial"	1:46
25.	"War Is Coming"	2:06
26.	"Farewell"	3:02
27.	"Main Title (Season 2)"	1:05
Total length:		59:10

== Reception ==
=== Viewership ===
The Empress debuted at number one following its release on 29 September 2022, with 47.2 million hours watched in four days (29 September to 2 October 2022), becoming Netflix's most-watched non English-language series for over a week. Within 11 days, it was running in approximately 18.7 million homes and was the second most-watched Netflix series worldwide (behind Dahmer – Monster: The Jeffrey Dahmer Story), with 106.6 million hours streamed. It was in the top ten in 79 countries in its first week and in 88 countries in its second. Within 18 days, it was streamed for nearly 135 million hours in around 23.6 million homes worldwide.

The Empress is the most successful German original production on Netflix since the 2020 war drama Barbarians. The series had 59.43 million hours watched worldwide from 3–9 October 2022, and it was the seventh most popular non-English series of 2022, with five weeks in the global top 10 and 159,800,000 hours watched from 25 September to 30 October.

=== Critical response ===
The review aggregator website Rotten Tomatoes reported an 83% approval rating, with an average rating of 9/10 for the first season, based on six critic reviews.

=== Accolades ===
The Empress won Best Drama Series at the 51st International Emmy Awards.

== Historical accuracy ==
- In the waltz scene featuring the composer Johann Strauss II, Franz Joseph and Sisi dance to the "Kaiser-Walzer". The waltz was composed by Strauss in 1889, 35 years after the royal couple married.
- During the wedding that took place in 1854, people are dancing to Dvořák's "Serenade for Strings". It was composed in 1875.
- During the wedding ball waltzes, the dancing crowd occasionally switches to a contemporary dance style; according to published statements by the series showrunner Katharina Eyssen, the episode choreographer (Franka Marlene Foth) deliberately incorporated modern-day details (including in costume, movement, and music) to make the story more accessible to a contemporary audience.
- Elisabeth was stated to have brown eyes. Devrim Lingnau has blue eyes.
- Duchess Helene's hair was much darker and Sisi's lighter than shown, which was a major contribution in Franz Joseph's attraction to the latter.
- Elisabeth and Franz Joseph's first meeting at Bad Ischl was not outdoors but during tea (with more relatives present than shown).
- Sisi and Franz are shown mutually falling in love. In reality, Franz was more in love with Sisi than she was with him.
- Franz did not propose publicly but had Archduchess Sophie request Ludovika's permission. Also, his proposal was not "out of the blue". Sophie had written that Franz had professed his love for Sisi shortly after he met her.
- Franz Joseph's second younger brother, Karl Ludwig, was in love with Elisabeth and wanted to marry her, not Maximilian, as shown. During childhood, Karl Ludwig (who is missing from the series) and Elisabeth exchanged letters and gifts.
- Sophie was resistant to Franz and Elisabeth's marriage and often fought with the empress over the upbringing of her (Elisabeth's) children. However, there is no evidence to support she actually hated Sisi. In reality, Sophie's letters and diaries positively describe her daughter-in-law.
- Archduchess Sophie had formed a friendship and a rumored love affair with Napoleon II (her husband's nephew) when she was younger, not Swedish Prince Gustav, as shown. Maximilian was allegedly the result of the said relationship, not Franz Joseph, although those rumours were deemed dubious.
- Franz Joseph and Maximilian had a sour relationship as adults, but there is no evidence that the latter conspired to overthrow his brother as emperor.
- Countess Esterházy was not fired as lady-in-waiting until much later, after Elisabeth had given birth to her children. The empress was the one who dismissed her, not Archduchess Sophie.

== In other media ==
Ahead of the premiere for the second season, Netflix released a companion novel titled The Empress: A Novel, by Gigi Griffis.
