= The von Trapp Family: A Life of Music =

2015 German-Austrian film by Ben Verbong

- Directed by: Ben Verbong
- Screenplay by: Christoph Silber, Tim Sullivan
- Based on: Agathe von Trapp: Memories Before and After The Sound of Music by Agathe von Trapp
- Produced by: Rikolt von Gagern
- Starring: Rosemary Harris; Matthew Macfadyen; Eliza Bennett; Lauryn Canny; Yvonne Catterfeld
- Cinematography: Jan Fehse
- Edited by: Alexander Dittner
- Music by: Enis Rotthoff
- Production companies: Clasart Film- und Fernsehproduktion; Concorde Media; Tele München Gruppe; Österreichischer Rundfunk
- Distributed by: Concorde Filmverleih; Constantin Film; Lionsgate
- Release date: 12 November 2015
- Running time: 98 minutes
- Countries: Germany; Austria
- Language: English
- Budget: $17,000,000 (estimated)

The von Trapp Family: A Life of Music (German: Die Trapp Familie - Ein Leben für die Musik) is a 2015 musical drama film about the lives of the Austrian Trapp family of singers, produced by Tele Munchen Group. It is based on Agathe von Trapp's 2003 memoir, Memories Before and After The Sound of Music.

Directed by Dutch filmmaker Ben Verbong, the film stars Eliza Bennett as young Agathe von Trapp (who was called "Liesl" in the 1965 The Sound of Music film). It also stars Matthew Macfadyen as her father, patriarch Georg von Trapp. His second wife, Maria von Trapp, is played by Yvonne Catterfeld.

== Cast ==
- Rosemary Harris as older Agathe von Trapp
  - Eliza Bennett as young Agathe
  - Lisa-Maria Trinkl as little Agathe
- Matthew Macfadyen as Georg von Trapp
- Lauryn Canny as Kirsty
- Yvonne Catterfeld as Maria von Trapp
- Johannes Nussbaum as Sigi
  - Elias Karl as Little Sigi
- Cornelius Obonya as Konrad
- Annette Dasch as Lotte Lehmann
- Barbara M. Messner as Mathilde
- Brigitte Kren as Frau Mayer
- Marco Dott as Attorney Müller
- Finnian Hipper as Rupert von Trapp
  - Luca Russegger as Little Rupert
- Christopher Hipper as Werner von Trapp
  - Emanuel Promberger as Little Werner
- Laura Lapuch as Hedwig von Trapp
  - Alisa Rotthaler as Little Hedwig
- Anika Baumgartlinger as Martina von Trapp
  - Helen Winter as Little Martina
- Kitty Kratzer as Johanna von Trapp
  - Franziska Lehfeldt as Little Johanna
- Isabella Holyst as Maria Franziska von Trapp
  - Luna Cengu as Little Maria
- Lara Weilharter as Rosmarie Erentrudis von Trapp
  - Emma Schwamberger as Little Rosmarie Erentrudis von Trapp
- Philippa Mayr-Melnhof as Eleonore von Trapp
  - Miriam Plasse as Little Eleonore
- Robert Seeliger as Marcus von Trapp
- Cosima Shaw as Carrie von Trapp
