= Christine Alderson =

British film producer

Christine Alderson (born August 1967) is a British film producer, and the director of the production company Ipso Facto Productions.

== Early life ==
Alderson was born in Stone, Staffordshire, in August 1967. She was educated there at St Dominics Convent School, a Catholic convent independent school, and later at Cockermouth Grammar School in the Lake District.

== Life and career ==
Alderson co-founded Ipso Facto Films with Jacqui Lawrence in Newcastle in 1993. Ipso Facto Films ceased to exist in 2013 and Alderson now runs Ipso Facto Productions as sole director.

Among Alderson's more than 20 films as producer, co-producer or executive producer are The Banksy Job, This Beautiful Fantastic, Snow in Paradise, Valhalla Rising, Soulboy, Irina Palm, School for Seduction and Nasty Neighbours.

Alderson is a graduate of EAVE, ACE and Inside Pictures. She is a member of both BAFTA and EFA.

== Personal life ==
Alderson married Adam Page, a professional clown, in 2001 and they separated in 2014. They have two children, Amy Eloise Alderson Page and Oliver Adam Alderson Page.

== Filmography ==
- Martyrs Lane (2021)
- The Devil Outside (2018)
- The Banksy Job (2016)
- This Beautiful Fantastic (2016)
- Snow in Paradise (2014)
- Event 15 / Alpha Alert (2013)
- Comes a Bright Day (2012)
- Soulboy
- Valhalla Rising (2009)
- Who Killed Nancy? (2009)
- Dot.com (2008)
- Irina Palm (2007)
- Short Order (2005)
- Bye Bye Blackbird (2005)
- School for Seduction (2004)
- Headrush (2003)
- Nasty Neighbours (1999)
