= Josephine Thiesen =

German actress (born 1999)

Josephine Thiesen (born 1999, Hamburg) is a German actress.

== Biography ==
Thiesen performed in a theatre group in Hamburg from a young age and, after completing her Abitur, studied acting at the Rostock University of Music and Theatre. She completed her studies in 2022/23 with an Artist Diploma. In 2020, as part of the Erasmus Programme, she spent a trimester at the École supérieure d’art dramatique in Paris. In 2023/24, she was accepted into the stART.up funding programme of the Claussen-Simon-Stiftung.

While still a student, she played Duchess Sophie in Marleen Valien's short film Ein kleiner Schnitt. The film was screened at the Hof International Film Festival in 2020. In 2021, she appeared as Mimi the goose in the ZDF fairy-tale film Zwerg Nase. She played Rebeka in Oona von Maydell's short film Somnambule. In the 2023 miniseries Zwei Seiten des Abgrunds, which aired on HBO Max, she portrayed 17-year-old Merle, whose murder sets the plot in motion.

In the second season of the Netflix series Die Kaiserin, she portrayed Belgian Princess Marie Charlotte in 2024, who later became the wife of Archduke Maximilian of Austria. She reprised the role in the third and final season, released in 2026, alongside Johannes Nussbaum as Maximilian. Also released on Netflix in October 2026 was the six-part miniseries Die Falle by Isabel Kleefeld, in which she portrays Anna, the sister of the main character, Lisa Konrad.

In the same year, she was part of the cast of French-Italian feature film Roma Elastica by Bertrand Mandico, which was screened in the Séances de minuit section at the 2026 Cannes Film Festival. She is set to appear on screen in 2027 in Tom Ford's film adaptation of Anne Rice's novel Cry to Heaven.

Since 2024, she has performed at the Theater im Pfalzbau in Ludwigshafen in productions directed by artistic director Tilman Gersch. In Carlo Goldoni's comedy Das Kaffeehaus, she played Ridolfo and the other female roles. The Ludwigshafen Festival opened in October 2025 with a production of Shakespeare's Measure for Measure, in which she appeared alongside Nina Petri. In 2026, this was followed by Elfriede Jelinek's Prinzessinnendramen, in which she appeared on stage with Tobias Lutze.

Thiesen is a member of Hamburg-based SONDER Ensemble, where she works as both an actress and dramaturge. As a narrator and singer, she recorded two audiobooks for Hörcompany featuring stories from Marcus Pfister's The Rainbow Fish, which were released in October 2022.

== Filmography ==
- 2020: Ein kleiner Schnitt (short film)
- 2021: Zwerg Nase (television film)
- 2022: Somnambule (short film)
- 2023: Zwei Seiten des Abgrunds (miniseries)
- 2024–2026: Die Kaiserin (television series)
- 2026: Die Falle (miniseries)
- 2026: Roma Elastica

== Theatre (selected) ==
- 2020: Andorra by Max Frisch (Barblin), Volkstheater Rostock, directed by Stephan Thiel
- 2020: Tableau – The Colour of Sound, SONDER Ensemble, University of Music and Theatre Rostock, directed by Matias Mucchi
- 2024: Das Kaffeehaus by Carlo Goldoni (Ridolfo and other roles), Theater im Pfalzbau Ludwigshafen, directed by Tilman Gersch
- 2025: Measure for Measure by William Shakespeare (Isabella), Theater im Pfalzbau Ludwigshafen, directed by Tilman Gersch
- 2025: Pasta Diva (Norma), SONDER Ensemble, Sprechwerk Theater Hamburg
- 2026: Prinzessinnendramen. Der Tod und das Mädchen I–V by Elfriede Jelinek, Theater im Pfalzbau Ludwigshafen, directed by Tilman Gersch
- 2026: Alice's Adventures in Wonderland (Alice), SONDER Ensemble, MS Bleichen Hamburg
