= Hannah Rae =

English actress

- Education: Royal Central School of Speech and Drama
- Occupation: Actress
- Years active: 2011–present
- Agent: Curtis Brown Literary and Talent Agency

Hannah Rae is an English actress. She came to prominence in her 2016 feature film debut City of Tiny Lights, for which she was nominated for the Most Promising Newcomer Award at the British Independent Film Awards.

== Filmography ==
=== Film ===
Year	Title	Role	Director	Notes	Ref(s)
2014	Crushed	Leah Pinkerton	Jane Sanger	Short film	
2016	City of Tiny Lights	Young Shelley / Emma	Pete Travis		
2018	Fighting with My Family	Courtney	Stephen Merchant		
2019	Carmilla	Lara	Emily Harris		
2021	Martyrs Lane	Bex	Ruth Platt		

=== Television ===
Year	Title	Role	Notes	References
2015–2017	Broadchurch	Daisy Hardy	9 episodes	
2019	Manhunt	Sarah Knight	1 episode	
2019	Call The Midwife	Elaine Pilkington	1 episode	
2019	Constance	Hannah Olivia Young	TV movie	
2023	Silent Witness	Star/Fiona Mendes	2 episodes	

=== Stage ===
Year	Title	Role	Director	Notes	References
2011	Two Weeks with the Queen	Doctor	Ken Banister	Oast Theatre, Tonbridge	
2011	Juliet 4 Romeo	Rosalind	Jamie Alexander Wilson	Magic Beans Productions, Stag Youth Theatre, The Stag Theatre, Sevenoaks	
2011	Limit To Your Love	Hannah	Jamie Alexander Wilson	Magic Beans Productions, Stag Youth Theatre, The Stag Theatre, Sevenoaks	
2012	A Midsummer Night's Dream	Hermia	Jamie Alexander Wilson	Stag Youth Theatre	
2012	The Vortex	Ensemble	Ellis Kerkhoven	Youth Music Theatre UK (YMT)	
2013	Great Expectations	Ensemble	Gerry Flanagan	Youth Music Theatre UK (YMT), Rose Theatre, Kingston	
2013	Robin Hood and the Babes in the Wood			Sevenoaks Panto, The Stag Theatre	
2017	Bodies	Daughter	Jude Christian	Royal Court Theatre	
