= Ivor Spencer =

UK chef (1924–2009)

Ivor Spencer, MBE (20 November 1924 – 10 January 2009) was the founder of the Ivor Spencer International School for Butlers and the Professional School for Toastmasters.

Spencer was born in East London and started out as a chef at the Dorchester Hotel in that city before choosing to become a toastmaster in 1956. In the 1960s, he worked as a talent manager for the beat group The Snobs and co-wrote their debut single, "Buckle Shoe Stomp". In 1977, he established the Professional School for Toastmasters and has since gone to officiate at over 1,000 royal events.

In 1981, he opened up the Ivor Spencer School of Butlers and Personal Assistants in Dulwich, a suburb of London. Under this school, he has trained butlers and catering staff throughout the world in hotels such as the Ocean Club in the Bahamas and the Park Tower in Argentina. One of his graduates, David Morgan, is now Head Butler and in charge of 28 butlers at The St. Regis Hotel in New York. As of 2006, Spencer's course for aspiring butlers runs twice a year and costs approximately £5,375. The course spans six weeks and covers the ins and outs of being a butler.

On 27 June 2002, Prince Charles made him an MBE at Buckingham Palace in the Queen’s Golden Jubilee year. He has also made television appearances on the Late Show with David Letterman and the Today show.
