= Melanie Raabe =

German novelist and journalist

- Melanie Raabe at the Frankfurt Book Fair 2026
- Born: August 1, 1981 (age 45); Jena, Bezirk Gera, East Germany
- Education: University of Bochum
- Occupation: Writer
- Writing career
- Pen name: Melanie Vega
- Language: German
- Years active: 2011-present
- Genre: Crime thriller
- Notable works: The Trap, The Stranger
- Website: melanieraabe.de

Melanie Raabe (born 1 August 1981 in Jena) is a German novelist and journalist.

== Biography ==
Melanie Raabe was born in Jena, East Germany, and grew up in Wiehl. Her father was a visiting student from Benin.

She studied media science and literature at the University of Bochum. She then began a career in journalism.

In 2011, her short story The Tooth Fairy (dt. Die Zahnfee) won the top award of the German Short Crime Awards at the Tatort Eifel festival for crime literature. She self-published The Ugly Ones (dt. Die Hässlichen) as an e-book.

Her novel The Trap (dt. Die Falle) was released at the Leipzig Book Fair in 2015. The movie rights for The Trap were sold at the Berlinale to TriStar Pictures. The book won the Stuttgart Crime Fiction Prize the following year.

A six-part television adaptation, The Trap, written and directed by Isabel Kleefeld, was released on Netflix on 13 October 2026.

In 2016, her novel The Stranger (dt. Die Wahrheit) was published as a fiction book, radio play and audio book.

In 2018, Raabe released her novel The Shadow (dt. Der Schatten).

In 2019, her novel The Forests (dt. Die Wälder) was published under btb Verlag. She was nominated for the Shortlist Leo-Perutz Awards in the category Best new publication (crime novel) for The Shadow (dt. Der Schatten), but lost against Alex Beer (Daniela Larcher).

== Works ==
=== Fiction ===
Year	Original title	English translation	ISBN	Editor	Writer	Ref.
2011	Die Zahnfee	"The Tooth Fairy"	—	—	Melanie Vega (Pseudonym)	
2014	Die Hässlichen	"The Ugly Ones"	978-3844-28019-7	epubli GmbH	Melanie Vega (Pseudonym)	
2015	Die Falle	"The Trap"	978-3442-75491-5	btb Verlag	Melanie Raabe	
2016	Die Wahrheit	"The Stranger"	978-3442-71690-6	btb Verlag	Melanie Raabe	
2018	Der Schatten	"The Shadow"	978-3442-71903-7	btb Verlag	Melanie Raabe	
2019	Die Wälder	"The Forests"	978-3442-75753-4	btb Verlag	Melanie Raabe	

=== Radio plays ===
Year	Original title	English translation	Writer	Editor	Ref.
2017	Die Wahrheit	"The Stranger"	Melanie Raabe	Der Hörverlag	
2019	Der Abgrund	"The Abysm"	Melanie Raabe	Der Hörverlag	

=== Audio books ===
Year	Original title	English version	Writer	Speaker	Ref.
2015	Die Falle	"The Trap"	Melanie Raabe	Devid Striesow, Birgit Minichmayr	
2016	Die Wahrheit	"The Stranger"	Melanie Raabe	Nina Kunzendorf, Andreas Pietschmann, Devid Striesow	
2018	Der Schatten	"The Shadow"	Melanie Raabe	Katja Bürkle, Melanie Raabe	
2019	Die Wälder	"The Forests"	Melanie Raabe	Melanie Raabe, Anna Schudt	

== Awards and nominations ==
Year	Award	Category	Work	Result	Ref.
2011	Tatort Eifel (German Short Crime Awards)	German Short Crime	Die Zahnfee	Won	
2015	Kulturförderpreis des Oberbergischen Kreises	Fiction	Herself	Second place	
2016	Stuttgart Crime Fiction Awards (Witwer-Debut crime price)	Best German-speaking debut crime novel	Die Falle	Won	
2019	Shortlist Leo-Perutz-Awards	Best new publication (Genre crime novel)	Der Schatten	Nominated	
