= Friederike Becht =

German actress

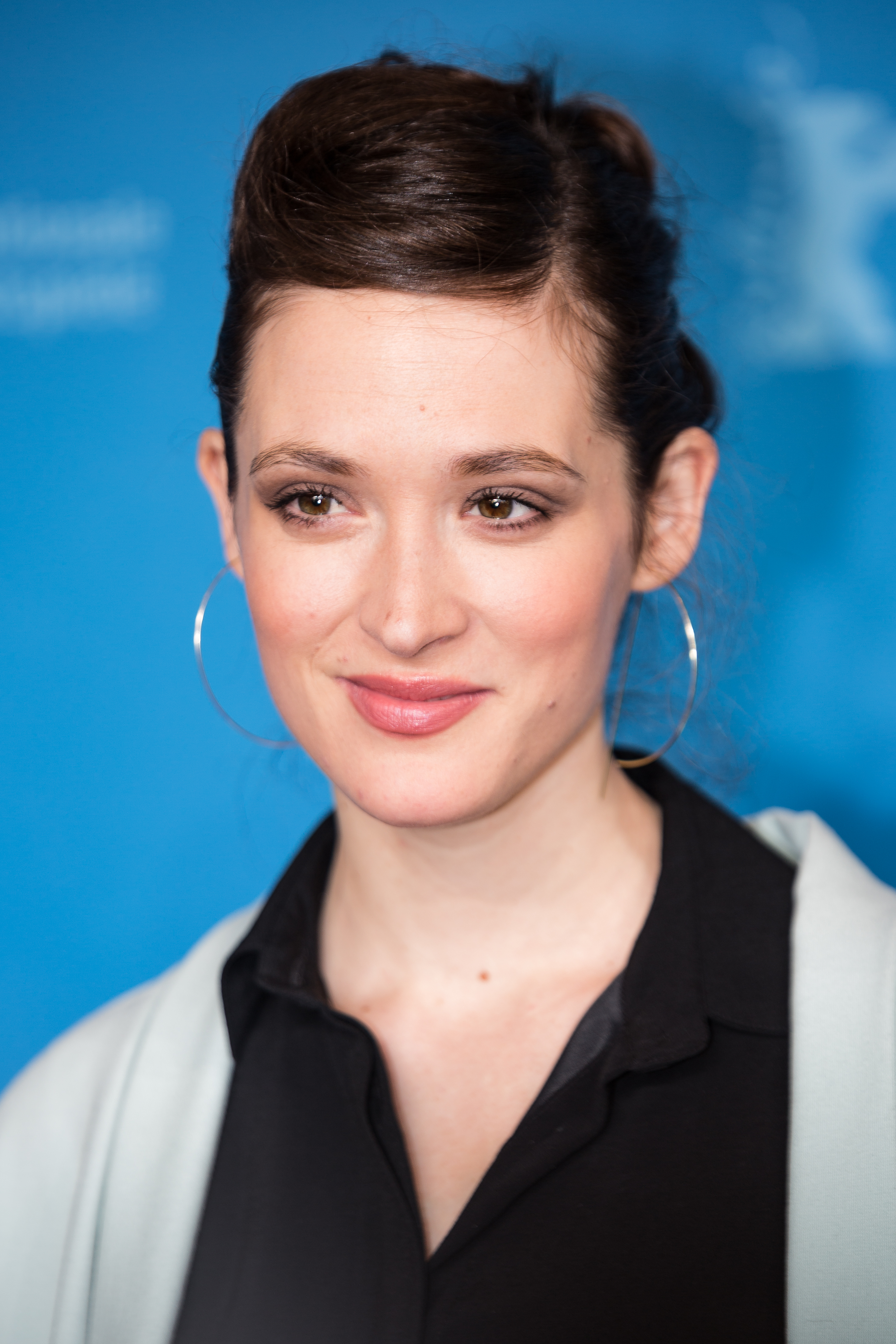
- Born: 14 October 1986; Bad Bergzabern
- Education: Berlin University of the Arts
- Occupations: Stage actor, film actor, actor
- Awards: Bochumer Theaterpreis (2014); Ulrich Wildgruber Award (2015)

Friederike Becht (born 14 October 1986) is a German actress.

== Life ==
Becht was born in Bad Bergzabern, and studied acting at the Berlin University of the Arts. She worked as an actor at the Ernst Deutsches Theater Hamburg, the Schauspielhaus Zürich, the Berliner Ensemble and the Stadttheater Freiburg. Her first major success in 2007, was the role of Thekla in Peter Stein's Wallenstein at the Berliner Ensemble, for which she was honored by the magazine Theater heute with a nomination for "Best Newcomer Actress".

In 2009/10 she was a member of the Ensemble at the Schauspiel Essen. There she presented, among other things, the Solveig in Peer Gynt, the title role in The Little Witch and the main role Tanja in the Lutz Hübner premiere Night History. In the following season, she moved with director Anselm Weber to the Schauspielhaus Bochum, where she is a permanent ensemble member. In Bochum she played, Lyudmila (Wassa's daughter) in Wassa Schelesnowa, Cecily Cardew in Bunbury, Maria in What you want, the main role Vera Herbst in House by the lake and Maria in Yerma.

Becht also appeared in several television and cinema films. In 2008, she got a supporting role (Angela Berg) in the German-American co-production The Reader. The following year, she played Gerda Reich in the television biography The Author of Himself: The Life of Marcel Reich-Ranicki. In 2011, she starred in the feature film Westwind.

In the feature film Hannah Arendt, Becht shared the role with Barbara Sukowa in 2012. In 2015, she appeared in the ARD biopic A Doll to Treasure about Käthe Kruse, and in 2019 in Brecht.

In 2026, Becht starred as Lisa Konrad in the Netflix miniseries The Trap.

== Family ==
Becht has a son and a daughter with the poetry slammer Sebastian Rabsahl; she lives in Bochum.

== Awards ==
- 2014: Bochumer Theaterpreis
- 2015: Ulrich Wildgruber Prize
