= Ruth Platt =

British actress, writer and director

Ruth Platt is a British actress, writer and director, who has appeared in The Pianist (2002).

== Early life ==
Platt studied English literature at University College, Oxford, before training at RADA, leaving in her second year.

== Career ==
In 2015, Platt directed a British horror film, The Lesson which was inspired by Platt's own experience and an article she read about a teacher who had a history of violence. In 2019, she directed The Black Forest which screened at Edinburgh International Film Festival.

== Films ==
- The Prince and the Pauper (2000) as Sarah
- The Pianist (2002) as Janina Bogucki
- The Lesson (2015) as director
- The Black Forest (2019) as director
- Martyrs Lane (2021) as director

== Television ==
- Bad Girls (series 5) (2003)
- Heartbeat
