= The Snobs =

Snobs
- Origin: Croydon, London, England
- Genres: British beat
- Labels: Decca Records
- Past members: Colin Sandland, Eddie Gilbert, John Boulden, Pete Yerrell

The Snobs were a British rock group active in the mid-1960s.

The group, originally known as The Apostles, got their break after meeting Ivor Spencer, who became their manager. They were best noted for their gimmick of performing in 18th-century period costumes, complete with buckle shoes and powdered wigs.

Their debut single, "Buckle Shoe Stomp", was co-written by Spencer and released on Decca Records in the UK in 1964. The Snobs were popular in Sweden and Denmark; Decca released a further Scandinavian single featuring covers of "Heartbreak Hotel" and "Giddy Up a Ding Dong".

The group travelled to the United States in 1964, where they played several concerts, appeared on The Red Skelton Show, and recorded a never-released cover of "Love Potion No. 9" with producer Gary S. Paxton.

The Snobs disbanded in 1965, having released only the two aforementioned singles.

== Personnel ==
- Colin Sandland (lead guitar)
- Eddie Gilbert (drums)
- John Boulden (rhythm guitar)
- Pete Yerrell (bass guitar)

== Discography ==
=== Singles ===
- "Buckle Shoe Stomp" (Sandland/Spencer/Boulden) b/w "Stand and Deliver" (Sandland/Boulden) – Decca Records, 1964
- "Heartbreak Hotell" [sic] (Axton/Durden/Presley) b/w "Ding Dong" [sic] (Bell/Lattanzi) – Decca Records, 1964

== Videography ==
- The Snobs (British Pathé, 1964)
