= Martyrs Lane =

2021 British horror film directed by Ruth Platt

- Film poster
- Directed by: Ruth Platt
- Written by: Ruth Platt
- Produced by: Christine Alderson; Katie Hodgkin
- Starring: Denise Gough; Steven Cree; Anastasia Hille; Hannah Rae; Kiera Thompson
- Cinematography: Márk Györi
- Edited by: Chris Barwel
- Music by: Anne Müller
- Production companies: British Film Institute; Ipso Facto Productions; Sharp House
- Distributed by: Shudder (United States); LevelK (International)
- Release dates: August 19, 2021 (Fantasia International Film Festival); September 9, 2021 (United States)
- Running time: 96 minutes
- Country: United Kingdom
- Language: English

Martyrs Lane is a 2021 British gothic horror film written and directed by Ruth Platt, produced by Christine Alderson and Katie Hodgkin and starring Denise Gough, Steven Cree, Anastasia Hille, Hannah Rae and Kiera Thompson.

== Plot ==
A 10 year-old girl named Leah (Kiera Thompson) lives in a large vicarage in England and every night she's visited by a mysterious guest who offers her knowledge.

Act 1: The Setup and The Secret Ten-year-old Leah lives in a drafty UK (United Kingdom) vicarage with her older sister Bex, her busy priest father Thomas, and her emotionally detached mother Sarah. Sarah clearly resents or avoids Leah and obsessively wears a locket. Leah opens the locket, finds a lock of blonde hair (unusual, as the family has dark hair), and accidentally drops it out the window. Sarah is devastated by its loss. Leah is plagued by nightmares and asthma, sensing a deep fracture in her family. A young mother and teething baby take temporary refuge at the vicarage, adding to the household's chaotic atmosphere.

Act 2: The Nightly Visitor and The Game A ghostly young girl matching Leah's age appears at Leah's window wearing a white dress and fake angel wings. The ghost has no name and proposes a nightly game of "two truths and a lie". This game functions as a manipulative scavenger hunt, forcing Leah to find hidden objects around the house and property—such as spelling blocks and a loose button. Leah, seeking connection, plays along, but her actions wreak havoc. For example, Leah sews the ghost's button onto Sarah's sweater poorly; the button falls off, and the visiting baby chokes on it, forcing the guests to flee. The ghost's appearance progressively deteriorates, growing dirtier and manifesting bloody injuries. Bex warns Leah to stop digging into the past, knowing their mother's fragile mental state cannot handle it.

Act 3: The Truth and The Tragedy The scavenger hunt forces the family's repressed trauma into the light. The hidden items reveal the name "Rachel". Leah discovers that Rachel was her older sister, who was struck and killed by a joyrider while riding her bicycle before Leah was born. Sarah never processed this grief. She effectively erased Rachel's name from the house while secretly clinging to her memory (the lock of hair), which resulted in her emotional abandonment of her living daughters.

The Ending The ghost is the spirit of Rachel, demanding acknowledgement. Once the truth is fully exposed, the psychological toll on Sarah becomes absolute. Instead of healing and moving on, Sarah completely succumbs to her grief. In the climax, Leah witnesses Sarah leaving the house and choosing to walk away with Rachel's spirit into the night, prioritizing her dead daughter over her living one. In the final scene, Thomas is directing movers to pack up the house, ordering them to leave the piano behind. Leah sees an apparition of Sarah and Rachel playing the piano together. The logical conclusion is that Sarah committed suicide or died of her grief to join Rachel in the afterlife, permanently fracturing the family. The trauma was not healed; it consumed the mother entirely.

== Cast ==
- Denise Gough as Sarah
- Steven Cree as Thomas
- Anastasia Hille as Lillian
- Hannah Rae as Bex
- Kiera Thompson as Leah

== Reception ==
The review aggregator website Rotten Tomatoes reported an approval rating of 91%, based on 32 reviews. The site's consensus states: "Well-acted by its young leads, Martyrs Lane tells a slow-burning ghost story that gathers real emotional weight". Metacritic, which uses a weighted average, assigned the film a score of 64 out of 100 based on 6 critics, indicating "generally favorable reviews".

Nick Allen writing for the website RogerEbert.com gave the film 31/2 out of 4 starts, stating: "'Martyrs Lane' is ruled by grief, often dulled and overdrawn by it, but its young surrogates give us the unique opportunity to see its themes presented without compromise". Phil Hoad from the newspaper The Guardian gave "Martyrs Lane" three out of five starts, saying: "Ruth Platt’s third film is at first almost too subtle for its own good. As Leah’s new friend directs her to small objects around the house and grounds, including minuscule letter-bearing dice, Platt’s storytelling is high-risk, almost obscure, leaving viewers much to infer". Wendy Ide from the British film magazine Screen International called it "a picture which would make a credible addition to midnight-movie strands, but which has an appeal which should extend beyond horror audiences. Tonally, with its emphasis on nurture and parent-child relations, there’s a kinship with films like Under the Shadow".
