= Alice Dwyer =

German actress (born 1988)

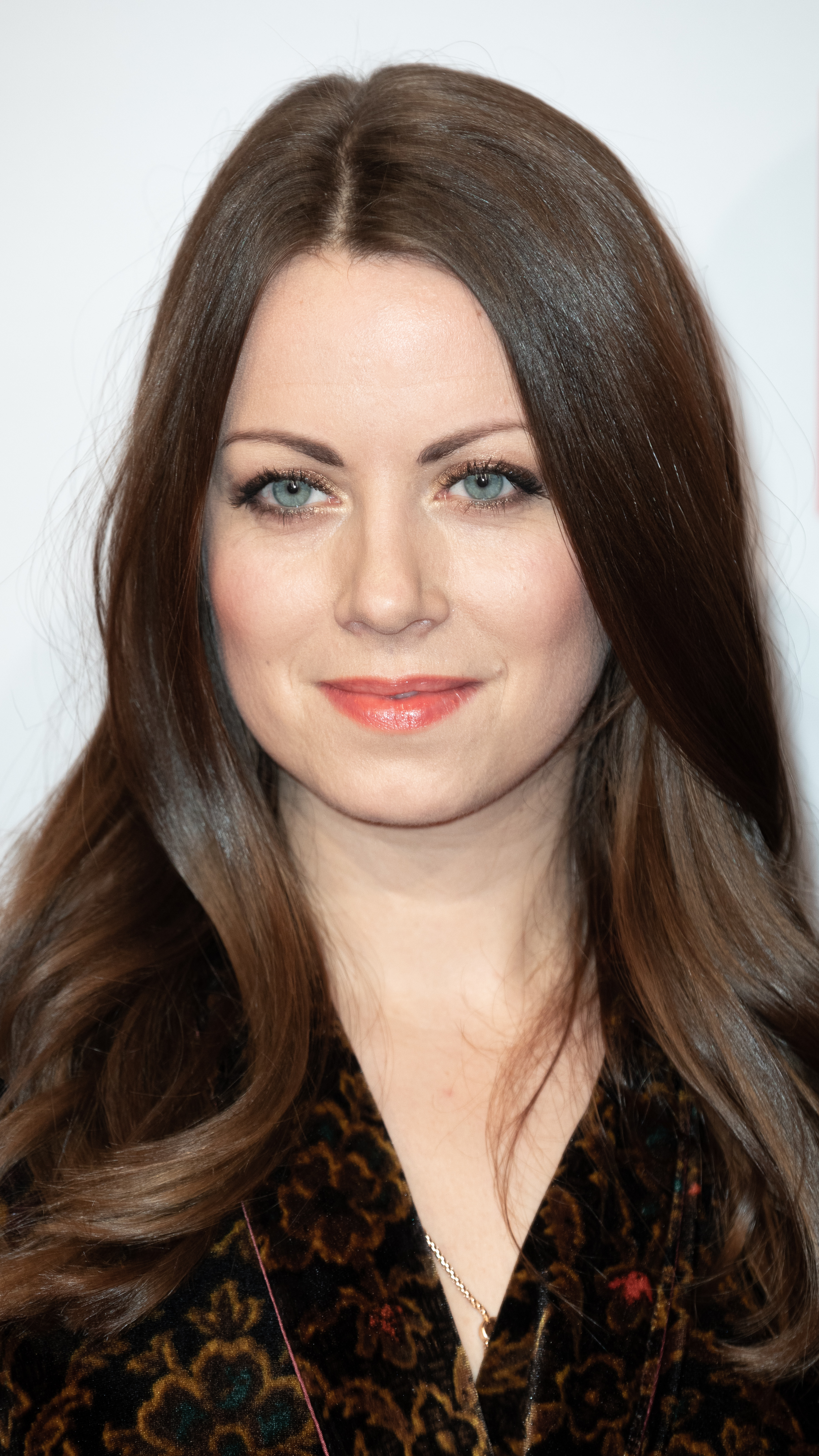
- Dwyer filming, 2019
- Born: Alice Deekeling; 1988 (age 37–38); West Berlin, West Germany
- Occupation: Actress
- Years active: 1999–present

Alice Dwyer (née Alice Deekeling; born 1988) is a German actress.

In 2003, she received the silver Deutscher Filmpreis for her performance as Katharina in Distant Lights and in 2008 the Filmfestival Max Ophüls Preis as best new talent.

Dwyer uses the last name of her New Zealand born mother, Angela Dwyer, as a stage name. She has been married to actor Sabin Tambrea since 2018.

== Selected filmography ==
Year	Title	Role	Notes
2002	Baby	Lilli	
2003	Distant Lights	Katharina	
2004	Peas at 5:30	Alex Walter	
2007	Head Under Water	Regine Weyler	
2008	My Mother's Tears	Sik	
2010	A Quiet Life	Doris	
2011	Remembrance	Hannah Silberstein	
2012	Into the Blue	Nike Rabenthal	
2013	The Girl with Nine Wigs	Saskia Ritter	
2021	Black Island	Helena Jung	
