= Devrim Lingnau =

German actress (born 1998)

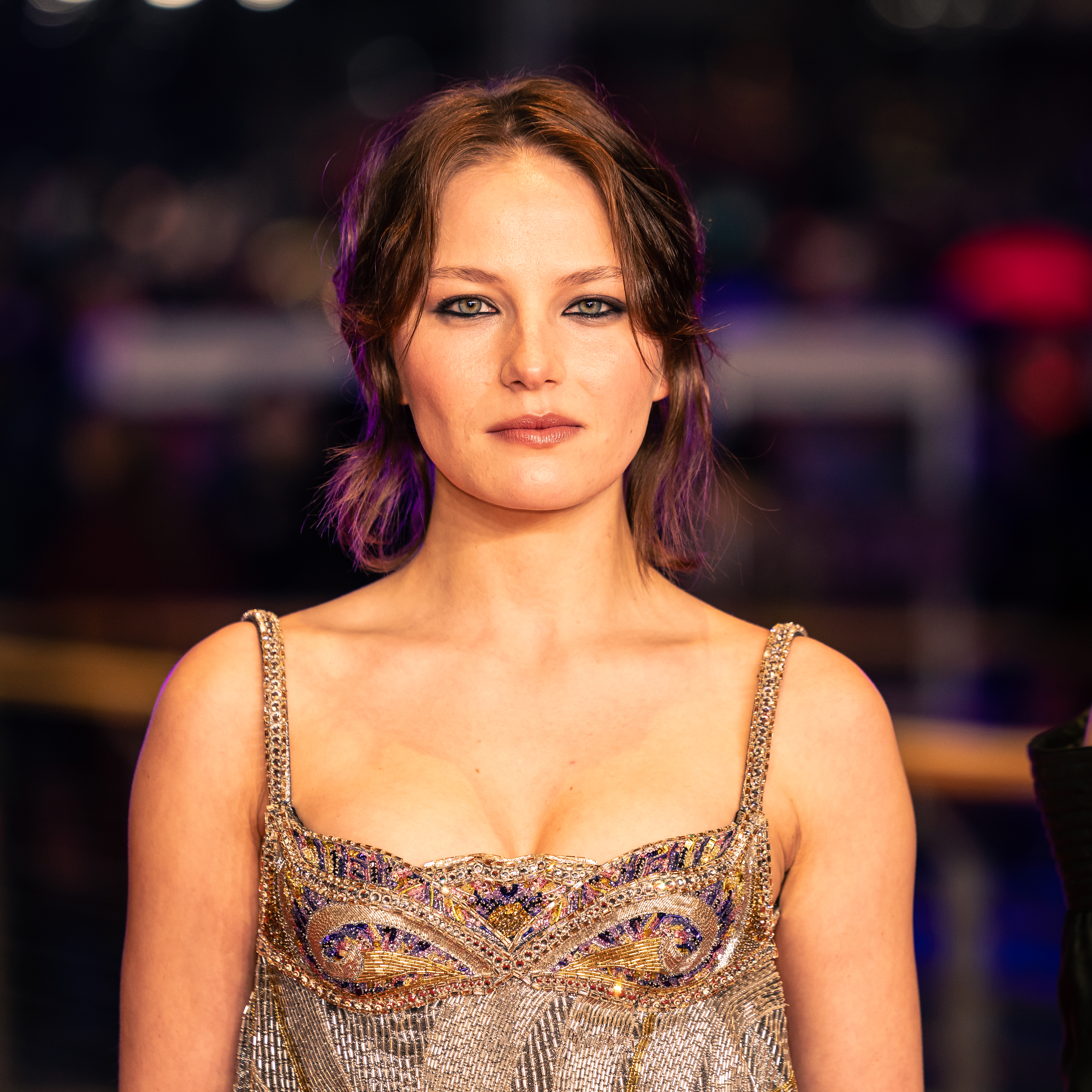
- Lingnau at the 2026 Berlin International Film Festival
- Born: 17 November 1998 (age 28); Mannheim, Baden-Württemberg, Germany
- Occupation: Actress
- Years active: 2014–present

Devrim Lingnau İslamoğlu (born 17 November 1998) is a German and Turkish actress.

== Life ==
Devrim Lingnau was born in Mannheim, Germany to a Turkish father and a German mother and grew up bilingual. During school she studied ballet and attended the Academy of Dance at the University of Music and Performing Arts Mannheim. At the State Academy of Fine Arts in Karlsruhe, she began studying art under German artist Ulla von Brandenburg.

In 2014 she was in a feature film of the ZDF television series Aktenzeichen XY … ungelöst (File Number XY...unsolved). From 2014 to 2015, she had a recurring role as Yasemin in the young adult mystery series Fluch des Falken on Bavarian Radio and roles on the children's channel KiKA. In the 2017 German television mini-series, Under Suspicion: Lost Security by ZDF and Arte, she played the Turkish-German Aleyna Kara, directed by Andreas Herzog. In the episode "Kinderkram" of the ARD series Die Kanzlei she was seen in an episode role as Tonja in 2018.

After graduating from high school in 2017 from the Johann-Sebastian-Bach-Gymnasium in Mannheim-Neckarau she starred in the 2019 British film Carmilla alongside Jessica Raine, Hannah Rae and Tobias Menzies, in which she played the title role. The film premiered at the Edinburgh International Film Festival in 2019. In 2021 she starred in the German TV film Borga by York-Fabian Raabe playing opposite Christiane Paul as her daughter.

In December 2020 it was announced that she would take on the title role in the Netflix series The Empress about Empress Elisabeth of Austria alongside Philip Froissant as Emperor Franz Joseph I. The series was released on 29 September 2022 and won Best Drama Series at the 51st International Emmy Awards.

== Filmography ==
- 2014: Aktenzeichen XY … ungelöst (TV series) 1 episode
- 2014–2015: Fluch des Falken (TV series)
- 2017: Unter Verdacht: Verlorene Sicherheit (TV series)
- 2018: Immortality (Mini-series)
- 2018: Die Kanzlei - Kinderkram (TV series)
- 2019: In Wahrheit - Still ruht der See (TV series)
- 2019: Carmilla (film) - Carmilla
- 2019: Der Bozen-Krimi - Gegen die Zeit (TV series)
- 2019: Auerhaus (film)
- 2020: Der Kriminalist - (TV series) 1 episode
- 2021: Borga
- 2021: Allmen und das Geheimnis der Erotik (TV series)
- 2022: The Empress (TV series) - Empress Elisabeth of Austria
- 2025: Hysteria (film)
- 2025: Lady Nazca (film) - Lady Nazca
