= Johannes Nussbaum =

Austrian actor (born 1995)

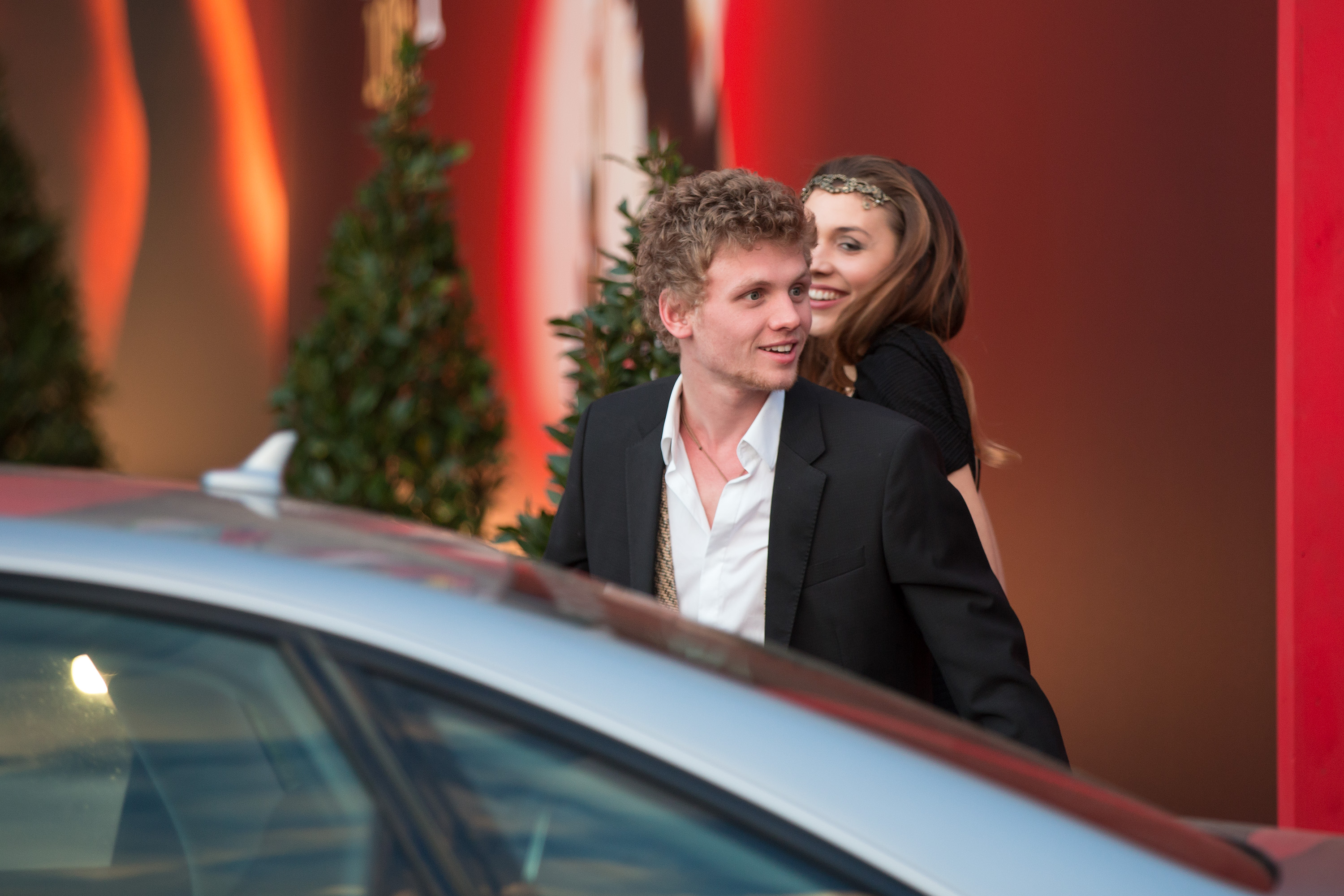
Johannes Nussbaum (Romy 2016)

Johannes Nussbaum, also spelled Johannes Nußbaum (born 31 May 1995 in Mödling, Lower Austria) is an Austrian actor.

== Life ==
Nussbaum already took part in school theatre at primary school in Mödling. At the suggestion of the supervisor of the school's theatre group, Nussbaum applied to the Vienna-based agency Eva Roth Casting, a well-known agency for casting children and amateur actors. He successfully completed an audition for the feature film Import Export by Ulrich Seidl, which was filmed in 2005 and 2006 and completed in May 2007. At the age of nine, he made his film debut in the movie, alongside Maria Hofstätter and Petra Morzé. He had been selected for his first film role from among several hundred children.

In the fourth season of the ORF crime series SOKO Donau (2008), he appeared in an episode role alongside Sona MacDonald, playing the younger son of a single mother and the brother of a murdered schoolboy. In the feature film Blutsbrüder teilen alles (2012), a story about the friendship between two boys during World War II, he played the leading role of Ferry; his friend and "blood brother" Alex was played by Lorenz Willkomm. In 2012, under the direction of Peter Kern, who had noticed Nussbaum after seeing him in Blutsbrüder teilen alles, he played the leading role in Kern's feature film Diamantenfieber oder Kauf dir einen bunten Luftballon. In the film, he portrayed Hansi, a 15-year-old thief who is left entirely to his own devices following the death of his parents and must provide for himself, his four brothers and his grandmother. For his performance, he received the award for Best Actor at the Austrian film festival Diagonale. The laudatory speech was delivered by Konstanze Breitebner. The jury particularly praised the "remarkable lightness and authentic presence" of his performance.

In 2013, he passed his Matura examination, including subjects such as German, English and sports. From autumn 2014 to 2018, he studied acting at the Ernst Busch Academy of Dramatic Arts in Berlin. During his studies, he appeared at the Deutsches Theater in Marat/Sade (premiere: 2016/17 season), directed by Stefan Pucher. In the 2017/18 season, he appeared as a guest at the Staatsschauspiel Dresden in the stage adaptation of the novel Das große Heft, directed by Ulrich Rasche, for which he received the Alfred Kerr Actor Award in 2019. In April and May 2018, he played Ferdinand in Kabale und Liebe at the Vienna theatre Bronski & Grünberg.

For his role as the carter Pauli in the television film Die Hebamme, he received a nomination for the New Faces Award. In the Vienna-set Tatort: Deckname Kidon (2015), he had a small role as Max, a warehouse worker. In the first season of the television series Schuld nach Ferdinand von Schirach (2015), he appeared in a leading guest role as Ben, a 17-year-old boarding-school student and the only friend and confidant of the outsider Henry. In the German comedy film Fack ju Göhte 2 (2015), he played Cedric, the leader of the Tsunami orphans. In the German-Austrian feature film Die Trapp Familie – Ein Leben für die Musik (2015), he played Sigi, the childhood friend of the female protagonist Agathe von Trapp.

From 2015 to 2018, Nussbaum played Simon Schneider in the first three seasons of the Austrian television series Vorstadtweiber. He portrayed the son of the series characters Maria and Georg Schneider, who was 16 years old at the beginning of the series. He was also the teenage lover and "toy boy" of the 42-year-old character Waltraud Steinberg (Maria Köstlinger), who prefers to let her initiate him into the art of love rather than study Latin with her. Nussbaum achieved considerable success with television audiences through this role, which attracted widespread attention in Austria. He was described, among other things, as a "women's favourite", "heartthrob", "public-service television darling" and "shooting star from Mödling".

From 2018 to 2021, he appeared in four films in the Austrian television film series Landkrimi, playing the son of Graz LKA investigator Sascha Bergmann (Hary Prinz). Since 2022, he has played Archduke Maximilian of Austria in the historical Netflix series Die Kaiserin, portraying him in a manner described as "exaggerated, almost Kinski-esque".

From the 2019/20 season until the end of the 2023/24 season, he was a permanent member of the ensemble at the Residenztheater in Munich (Bavarian State Theatre). Since the 2024/25 season, he has been a guest performer there.

His favourite authors include Friedrich Dürrenmatt and Hunter S. Thompson. In his private life, he enjoys listening to music by Iron & Wine, The Tallest Man on Earth and John Butler. Nussbaum lives in Vienna and Berlin.

== Filmography (selected) ==
- 2007: Import Export (feature film)
- 2008: SOKO Wien/SOKO Donau (episode: "Blutiger Ernst"); television series
- 2012: Diamantenfieber oder Kauf dir einen bunten Luftballon (feature film)
- 2012: Blutsbrüder teilen alles (feature film)
- 2014: Die Hebamme (television film)
- 2014: Precarious (short film)
- 2014: Schnell ermittelt (episode: "Lukas"); television series
- 2015: Tatort: Deckname Kidon (television film)
- 2015: Schuld nach Ferdinand von Schirach (episode: "Die Illuminaten"); television series
- 2015–2018: Vorstadtweiber (television series, 23 episodes)
- 2015: Fack ju Göhte 2 (feature film)
- 2015: Die Trapp Familie – Ein Leben für die Musik (feature film)
- 2016: Die Hebamme II (television film)
- 2018: Landkrimi – Steirerkind (television film series)
- 2018: CopStories (episode: "Alohool"); television series
- 2019: Prélude (feature film)
- 2019: Ein verborgenes Leben
- 2019: Landkrimi – Steirerkreuz (television film series)
- 2020: Landkrimi – Steirerwut (television film series)
- 2021: Hannes
- 2021: Landkrimi – Steirertod (television film series)
- 2021: Kaltmiete (short film)
- 2022–2026: Die Kaiserin (television series)
- 2025: Die drei ??? und der Karpatenhund
- 2026: Die andere Seite (feature film)

== Theatre (selected) ==
- 2016: Deutsches Theater (Berlin): Marat/Sade by Peter Weiss. Directed by Stefan Pucher
- 2018: Staatsschauspiel Dresden: Das große Heft by Ágota Kristóf (as the twin). Directed by Ulrich Rasche
- 2018: Bronski & Grünberg Theatre, Vienna: Kabale und Liebe by Friedrich Schiller (as Ferdinand von Walter). Directed by Calle Fuhr
- 2018: Salzburg Festival / Schauspiel Frankfurt: The Persians by Aeschylus (as Xerxes). Directed by Ulrich Rasche
- 2019: Bavarian State Theatre: Die Verlorenen (as Kevin). By Ewald Palmetshofer (world premiere). Directed by Nora Schlocker
- 2020: Bavarian State Theatre: Danton's Death by Georg Büchner (as Lacroix). Directed by Sebastian Baumgarten
- 2020: Bavarian State Theatre: Der starke Stamm by Marieluise Fleißer (as Hubert, Bitterwolf's son). Directed by Julia Hölscher
- 2020: Bavarian State Theatre: The Earthquake in Chile by Heinrich von Kleist (ensemble). Directed by Ulrich Rasche
- 2021: Bavarian State Theatre: Hamlet by William Shakespeare (as Hamlet). Directed by Robert Borgmann
- 2021: Bavarian State Theatre: Leonce and Lena by Georg Büchner. Directed by Thom Luz
- 2022: Bavarian State Theatre: Werther. A theatrical folly by Johann Wolfgang von Goethe, with texts by Karoline von Günderrode (as Werther). Directed by Elsa-Sophie Jach
- 2023: Theater Viel Lärm um Nichts, Munich / Pasinger Fabrik: Die Geschichte mit der Lampe – Fragmente einer unendlichen Liebe by Alexander Vaassen. Directed by Alexander Vaassen
- 2023: Bavarian State Theatre: James Brown trug Lockenwickler by Yasmina Reza (as Philippe). Directed by Philipp Stölzl
- 2023: Bavarian State Theatre: Jetzt oder Nie – A song recital by Florian Paul and Max Rothbart
- 2025: Bavarian State Theatre: Sankt Falstaff (as #2 / Harri). By Ewald Palmetshofer, freely adapted from Shakespeare's Henry IV, Part 1 (world premiere). Directed by Alexander Eisenach
- 2026: Bavarian State Theatre: Ich. Und das, was ihr daraus macht (ensemble). By Delschad Numan Khorschid. Directed by Daniela Kranz / Delschad Numan Khorschid (as part of the Welt Bühne Festival 2026)
- 2026: Faust, Part One (as young Faust). By Johann Wolfgang von Goethe. Directed by Ulrich Rasche (a collaboration between the Residenztheater Munich and the Salzburg Festival)
- 2026: Theater am Werk, Vienna: Die Quelle by Calle Fuhr (as investigative journalist Rasmus Erikson). In cooperation with the investigative journalism platform DOSSIER and the Schauspielhaus Wien.
