= Serkan Kaya (singer) =

Turkish singer, songwriter and composer (born 1977)

- Born: 12 June 1976 (age 50); Sivas, Turkey
- Genres: Arabesque; pop
- Occupations: Singer; songwriter; composer
- Years active: 1998–present

Serkan Kaya (born 12 June 1976) is a Turkish singer, songwriter and composer.

== Career ==
Kaya's first album Senden Sonra Ben was released in 2000, followed by Aşk Ne Demek Bilen Var Mı? (2011) and Gönül Bahçem (2015). Gönül Bahçem became the best-selling album in Turkey for weeks. The album's lead single "Kalakaldım" became one of the most listened songs on radio and television and was downloaded numerous times on digital platforms.

At the 43rd Golden Butterfly Awards, he was named the 'Best Male Folk-Classic Singer'.

== Discography ==
Albums

- Senden Sonra Ben – 2000
- Aşk Ne Demek Bilen Var Mı? – 2011
- Gönül Bahçem – 2015
- Miras – 2017

Singles

- "Mesele" – 2014
- "Benden Adam Olmaz (Burak Yeter Remix)" – 2015
- "Dağların Dumanı (Son Bir Kez)" – 2018
- "Tarifi Zor" – 2019
- "Yaradanım" – 2020
- "Hatıran Yeter" – 2021
- "Haybeden" (with Sinan Akçıl) – 2022
- "Kaçak" – 2022
- "Dönemem" (from the album Hürmet 3) – 2023
- "Güldür Yüzümü" – 2023
- "Ne Yazar" – 2024

== Awards and nominations ==
Year	Award	Category	Result
2016	43rd Golden Butterfly Awards	Best Male Folk-Classic Singer	Won
2017	8th Quality of Magazine Awards	Male Artist with the Best Quality	Won
2017	44th Golden Butterfly Awards	Best Male Folk-Classic Singer	Nominated
2018	MGD 23rd Golden Objective Awards	Arabesque Fantezi Artist of the Year	Won
2018	45th Golden Butterfly Awards	Best Male Folk-Classic Singer	Nominated
2020	46th Golden Butterfly Awards	Best Male Folk-Classic Singer	Nominated
