= Vertigo (soundtrack) =

Film score by Bernard Herrmann

Vertigo: Original Motion Picture Soundtrack

Soundtrack album by Bernard Herrmann
- Released: 1996
- Recorded: 1958
- Genre: Classical
- Length: 65:03
- Label: Varèse Sarabande

The music score for Alfred Hitchcock's 1958 film Vertigo was composed by Bernard Herrmann between 3 January and 19 February 1958. The recordings were made in London and Vienna, with the orchestra conducted by Muir Mathieson. A musicians' strike had prevented the score from being recorded in Los Angeles with Herrmann conducting.

What follows is a list of the music cues that appear in the film and where (or if) they can be found on the various releases of the original soundtrack recordings and significant re-recordings of the score.

== Breakdown of music cues ==
Bernard Herrmann's score for Vertigo consists of 42 cues, which comprise about 74 minutes of music heard in the film. (The small bits of source music used in the film, such as the Mozart piece heard on Midge's phonograph or the music Scottie and Judy dance to late in the film, were not composed by Herrmann and are therefore not considered as part of the score.) Note that Herrmann spelled the Kim Novak character's name as Madeline, not Madeleine.

In the following table, the length of the cues in the actual film are given. The letters afterward represent which CD release the cue can be found on, if applicable. [A] is the original version of the soundtrack recording; [B] the McNeely re-recording; and [C] the expanded re-release of the original soundtrack. [D] would be the Conlon re-recording, but as this recording contains all cues below, it was deemed unnecessary to be included in the list.

No.	Title	CD release	Length
1.	"Prelude"	[A] [B] [C]	3:00
2.	"Roof-Top"	[A] [B] [C]	1:38
3.	"The Window"		0:15
4.	"Madeline" (a.k.a. "Madeline's First Appearance")	[A] [B] [C]	1:12
5.	"Madeline's Car"	[B] [C]	2:32
6.	"The Flowershop"	[B] [C]	0:35
7.	"The Alleyway"	[B] [C]	0:34
8.	"The Mission"	[B] [C]	0:36
9.	"Mission Organ"	[C]	0:32
10.	"Graveyard"	[B]	1:57
11.	"Tombstone"	[B]	0:12
12.	"Carlotta's Portrait"	[A] [B] [C]	1:52
13.	"The Hotel"		1:24
14.	"The Hallway"		1:02
15.	"The Nosegay"		0:15
16.	"The Catalogue"		0:29
17.	"The Gallery"		0:39
18.	"The Bay"	[B] [C]	2:53
19.	"Sleep"		0:46
20.	"By the Fireside"	[B] [C]	2:51
21.	"Exit"		0:44
22.	"The Streets"	[C]	2:20
23.	"The Outing"		1:24
24.	"The Forest"	[B] [C]	3:43
25.	"The Beach"	[A] [B] [C]	3:27
26.	"3 A.M."		0:20
27.	"The Dream"	[B] [C]	2:37
28.	"Farewell"	[A] [B] [C]	4:25
29.	"The Tower"	[A] [B] [C]	2:28
30.	"The Nightmare"	[A] [B] [C]	1:55
31.	"Dawn"	[A] [B] [C]	1:26
32.	"The Past"	[C]	1:26
33.	"The Girl"	[C]	1:43
34.	"The Letter"	[B] [C]	4:14
35.	"Goodnight"	[B] [C]	2:23
36.	"The Park"	[B] [C]	0:35
37.	"The Hair Color"		1:20
38.	"Beauty Parlor"		0:12
39.	"Scène d'amour"	[A] [B] [C]	4:57
40.	"The Necklace"	[A] [B] [C]	2:08
41.	"The Return"	[A] [B] [C]	2:37
42.	"Finale"	[A] [B] [C]	2:24

== 1958 original soundtrack LP ==
The original soundtrack LP on Mercury Records contained 34 minutes of the music score. It included most of the major musical cues from the film but represented less than half of the complete score. The album was released on CD in 1990 as Mercury 422 106-2.

Vertigo: From The Motion Picture Sound Track (Mercury MG-20384 / released 1958)
No.	Title	Length
1.	"Vertigo Prelude and Rooftop"	4:38
2.	"Madeleine and Carlotta's Portrait"	3:11
3.	"The Beach"	3:28
4.	"Farewell and The Tower"	6:54
5.	"The Nightmare and Dawn"	3:30
6.	"Love Music" ("Scène d'amour")	5:04
7.	"The Necklace and The Return and Finale"	7:06
Total length:		34:21

== 1995 McNeely re-recording ==
In 1995, Varèse Sarabande released a new recording of the Vertigo score with Joel McNeely conducting the Royal Scottish National Orchestra. This recording boasted much better sound quality over the then 37-year-old original soundtrack recording, and it included almost twice as much of the score.

Vertigo: Original Motion Picture Score (Varèse Sarabande VSD-5600 / released 1995)
No.	Title	Length
1.	"Prelude and Rooftop"	4:35
2.	"Scotty Trails Madeline" (including "Madeline's First Appearance", "Madeline's Car", "The Flower Shop", "The Alleyway", "The Mission", "Graveyard" and "Tombstone")	8:22
3.	"Carlotta's Portrait"	2:34
4.	"The Bay"	3:08
5.	"By the Fireside"	3:39
6.	"The Forest"	3:25
7.	"The Beach"	3:27
8.	"The Dream"	2:42
9.	"Farewell and The Tower"	6:42
10.	"The Nightmare and Dawn"	4:10
11.	"The Letter"	3:53
12.	"Goodnight and The Park"	3:08
13.	"Scène d'amour"	5:09
14.	"The Necklace, The Return and Finale"	7:47
Total length:		62:41

== 1996 expanded original soundtrack re-release ==
Research conducted during the two-year-long restoration of Vertigo by Robert A. Harris and James C. Katz uncovered the original master recordings of the music score at Paramount Pictures. These stereo masters were used in the new 5.1 mix of the film, as well as a much expanded CD of the original soundtrack recording.

This CD is 64 minutes long (with the selection of cues closely matching that of the McNeely recording). Unfortunately, the tapes had not been stored under the best of conditions, and deficiencies can be heard in some spots. The CD liner notes state that the music track for the cue "The Graveyard" was too damaged to be included. For the 5.1 mix, the film restoration team was forced to lift the audio for the sequence from a music and effects reel located in Spain. However, 13 other (mostly minor) cues in the film are missing from the expanded soundtrack CD without explanation. Several can be cleanly extracted from the 5.1 mix of the film, indicating that the music tracks for some of these cues survive and were used for the new mix.

(Note that some parts of the CD are in stereo, and other parts are in mono. This is due to the London cues being recorded in stereo and the Vienna cues in mono.)

Vertigo: Original Motion Picture Soundtrack (Varèse Sarabande VSD-5759 / released 1996)
No.	Title	Length
1.	"Prelude and Rooftop"	4:39
2.	"Scotty Tails Madeleine" (including "Madeleine's First Appearance", "Madeleine's Car", "The Flower Shop", "The Alleyway", "The Mission", "Mission Organ")	6:15
3.	"Carlotta's Portrait"	1:56
4.	"The Bay"	2:56
5.	"By the Fireside"	2:53
6.	"The Streets"	2:23
7.	"The Forest"	3:45
8.	"The Beach"	3:27
9.	"The Dream"	2:43
10.	"Farewell and The Tower"	6:54
11.	"The Nightmare and Dawn"	3:30
12.	"The Past and The Girl"	3:11
13.	"The Letter"	4:13
14.	"Goodnight and The Park"	3:03
15.	"Scène d'amour"	5:04
16.	"The Necklace, The Return and Finale"	7:20
Total length:		64:12

== 1999 Conlon re-recording ==
This recording, with James Conlon conducting the Paris Opera Orchestra, is the only recording to date to feature the entire Bernard Herrmann score for Vertigo. All 42 cues are included, though the CD presents them as one long 74½ minute track. This CD is not as accessible as the previous two, as it was not released on its own. It was included with the now out-of-print Douglas Gordon book, Feature Film.

Artangel 99003 / released 1999
No.	Title	Length
1.	"[no title / complete Vertigo score]"
Total length:		74:35
