= Steven Cree =

Scottish actor (born 1980)

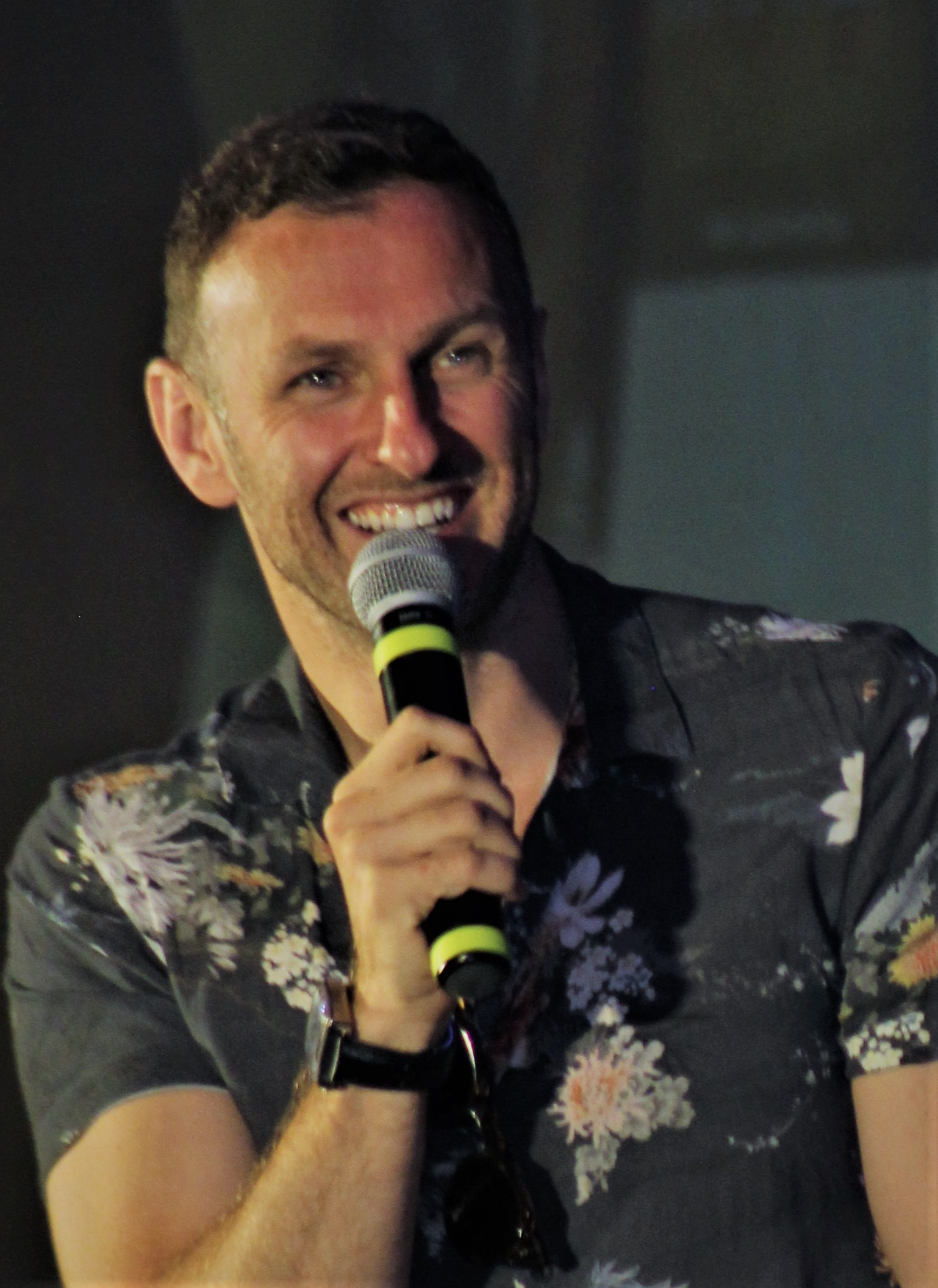
- Cree in 2018
- Born: Steven Cree; 1980 (age 45–46); Kilmarnock, East Ayrshire, Scotland
- Education: Royal Scottish Academy of Music and Drama
- Occupation: Actor
- Years active: 2001–present
- Known for: Ian Murray in Outlander (2014–present); Christopher Seton in Outlaw King (2018)

Steven Cree (born 1980) is a Scottish film, television and theatre actor. He is best known for his role as Ian Murray in the Starz television series Outlander. His other work includes the films Brave (2012), 300: Rise of an Empire (2014), Maleficent (2014), 51 Degrees North (2014), Churchill (2017), and the television series Lip Service.

== Early life and education ==
Steven Cree was born in 1980 and grew up in Kilmarnock, East Ayrshire, Scotland.

Upon completion of secondary school, he attended Langside College in Glasgow for a year before being accepted into the Royal Scottish Academy of Music and Drama (now known as the Royal Conservatoire of Scotland). At RSAMD, he was signed by a London talent agent and moved to the city after completing school.

== Career ==
Cree began his professional career in 2001 with the guest starring role of Gerry in an episode of CBBC's weekly comedy series G-Force. He went on to guest star in an episode of BBC's medical drama Doctors in 2002, and ITV's prison drama Bad Girls in 2003. 2006 saw Cree guest star in BBC's medical drama Holby City and Sky 1's football drama Dream Team. Cree returned to BBC's Doctors in 2007 with a second guest role in series nine, and he had a guest role in series eleven of the popular crime drama Silent Witness.

In 2009, Cree made the transition from television to feature films by starring as Antonio Vivaldi in director Liana Marabini's Vivaldi, the Red Priest and director Craig Lyn's short film Closing Doors. He was then cast in episode five of ITV's six part mini-series Identity, a crime drama following a newly formed police unit investigating identity theft cases. Cree worked with actor/director Noel Clarke twice in 2010 as he was featured in the thriller 4.3.2.1., which followed four friends targeted by a smuggling ring, and the comedy Huge, which focused on a would-be stand-up comedy duo. E4's teenage science-fiction drama Misfits saw Cree return to episodic television with a season two guest spot that same year. He was then featured in award-winning Kurdish director Chiman Rahimi's sort film Rojin. 2011 saw Cree feature in the supernatural thriller film The Awakening and in director Tom Harper's short film The Swarm.

2012 brought Cree a recurring role on BBC Three's groundbreaking drama Lip Service. He portrayed Ryder, Sam Murray's police partner, opposite Heather Peace. His next performance was as featured guest star Corporal Vince Grafton in a series two episode of ITV's murder mystery series Vera. Throughout 2012, Cree had minor roles in major motion pictures such as Disney's John Carter and Brave (animated; voice work), British thriller Tower Block, and the Noel Clarke comedy The Knot.

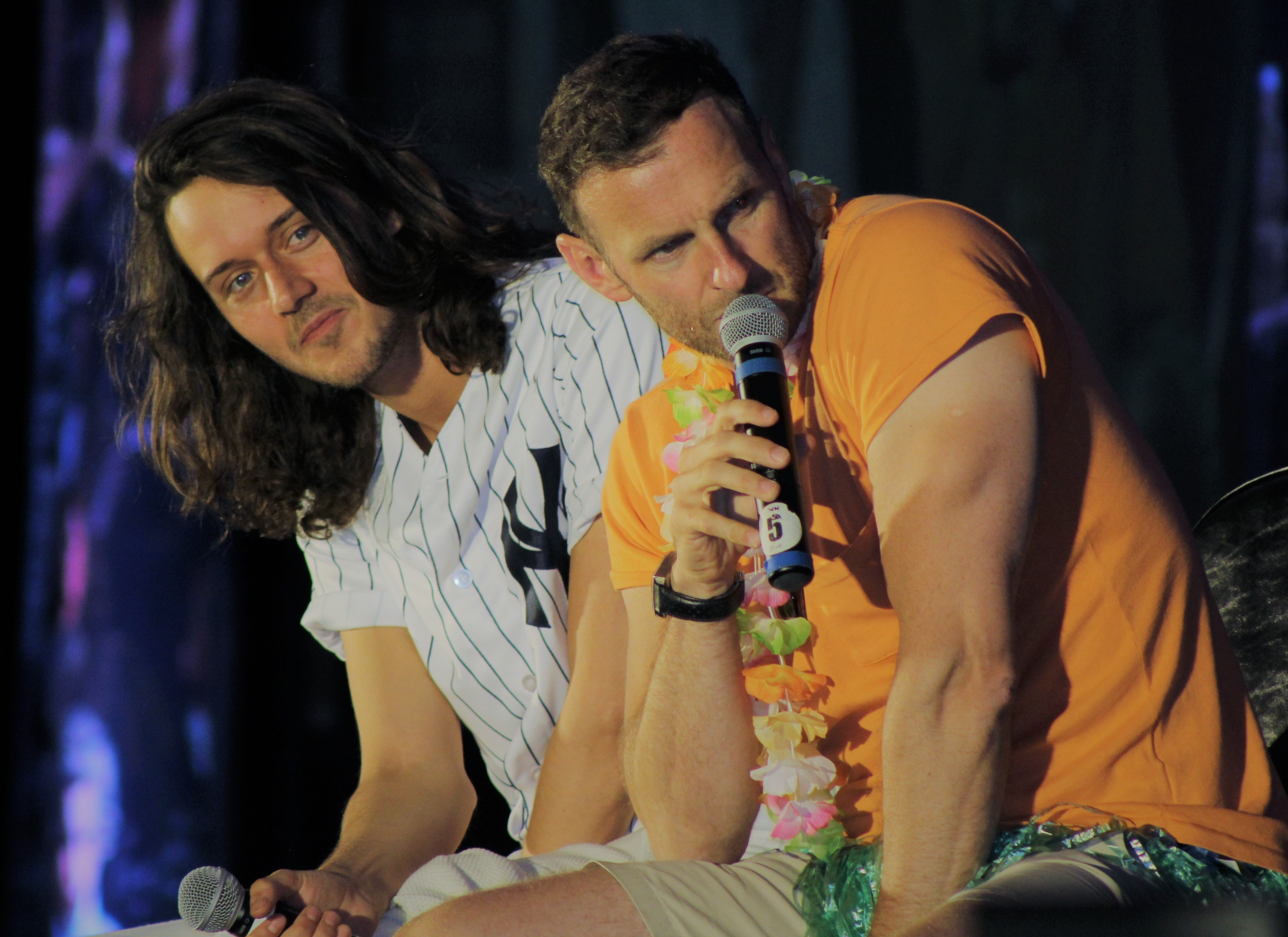
Steven Cree (R) and Cesar Domboy (L) answering questions during their panel at Creation Entertainment's Outlander convention in Las Vegas on 15 July 2018.

Actor turned director Sam Hoare's 2013 debut film, Having You, featured Cree in the role of Paul. That same year, he portrayed Lennox in Kenneth Branagh's stage production of Macbeth at the Manchester International Festival. The production sold out, but was broadcast live to audiences in Manchester, England and around the globe on 20 July 2013 as part of the National Theatre's NT Live broadcasts. That same year, director Ruth Sewell cast Cree in the lead role of Matt in her short film Fish Love, which was featured at the London Short Film Festival.

2014 saw Cree return to television in series two of the BBC's crime drama Shetland, based on the best-selling book series by Ann Cleeves. He next tackled minor roles in Disney's live action film Maleficent, which focuses on the villain of their 1959 classic Sleeping Beauty, and the made-for-television film Marvellous. He returned to television to guest star as Miras in the two-part Series Two premier of BBC's family drama Atlantis, which only ran for two seasons before being cancelled. It was announced in 2014 that Cree has been cast in the role of Ian Murray in Starz time travel drama Outlander, based upon the best-selling book series from author Diana Gabaldon. The role is recurring and will continue throughout the series.

Cree was cast in the guest role of Levesque in BBC's popular drama The Musketeers in 2015, portraying Porthos' brother-in-law in the series two episode. That same year, he guest starred in the "mockumentary" Hoff the Record alongside actor David Hasselhoff. He went on to roles in several feature films such as Colin Kennedy's Swung, Legacy, 51 Degrees North, and short film The Rat King, which was nominated for Best Short at the Edinburgh International Film Festival.

In 2016, Cree returned to crime drama Silent Witness in the two-part season nineteen episode "Flight", which focused on the murder of a critic of Muslim fundamentalism. Once again reuniting with director Noel Clarke, Cree was featured as Brick in the feature length crime drama Brotherhood. He then portrayed Scottish war hero and Navy meteorologist Captain James Stagg in 2017's D-Day film Churchill, which shed light on the little known fact that the invasion date had been moved due to weather.

Science fiction/fantasy film The Titan (2018), starring Sam Worthington and Tom Wilkinson, has Cree portraying Major Tom Pike in Earth's dystopian future. In 2018, in his second turn in a science-fiction film, Cree voiced the character ATRi in Hasraf Dulull's 2036 Origins Unknown, which explored the origins of an unknown object on the surface of Mars. That same year, the Netflix drama Outlaw King, starring Chris Pine as Robert the Bruce, featured Cree as Bruce's brother-in-law Sir Christopher Seaton. In addition to his roles in films and television, Cree wrote and starred in a short film entitled The Little Princess (2018), which was co-awarded Best Short Narrative film at the San Luis Obispo International Film Festival. He and director Jason Maza raised funds for the film on Kickstarter, a popular crowdfunding platform.

Cree would go on, the next year, to portray Andrew Bentham in BBC Two's political drama MotherFatherSon, opposite Richard Gere (in his first major television role). He would then join the cast of ITV's female centric drama Deep Water as series regular character Joe Kallisto. Late fall 2019 saw Cree feature in the latest feature film instalment of the Terminator franchise, Terminator: Dark Fate, opposite Linda Hamilton and Arnold Schwarzenegger.

Early 2020 saw him star as Chief Constable Stuart Collier, opposite Robert Carlyle, in Sky One's political thriller Cobra. He also completed filming on Ruth Platt's ghost story Martyrs Lane, which is scheduled to premiere at Fantasia Film Festival's 25th anniversary edition the next year. In 2021 Cree debuted as popular Scottish character Gallowglass in the second season of Sky One's television drama A Discovery of Witches, which is based upon Deborah Harkness' book series of the same name. He will reprise the role in season three of the series. Cree completed filming on horror feature The Twin, alongside fellow A Discovery of Witches cast member Teresa Palmer, in June 2021.

== Filmography ==
=== Television ===
Year	Title	Character	Production	Notes
2001	G-Force	Gerry	CBBC	1 episode
2002	Doctors	Kenny Frazier	BBC	Episode: "Fit"
2003	Bad Girls	Waiter	ITV	1 episode
2006	Holby City	David Harlem	BBC	Episode: "Honesty"
2006	Dream Team	Connor	Sky One	Episode: "Pains, Gains, & Automobiles"
2007	Doctors	Ryan Green	BBC	Episode: "Off the Edge"
2010	Identity	Young Thacker	ITV	Episode: "Somewhere They Can't Find Me"
2010	Misfits	Tom	E4	1 episode
2010–2012	Lip Service	Vince Ryder	BBC	Recurring role, 8 episodes
2012	Vera	Corporal Vince Grafton	ITV	Episode: "Sandancers"
2014	Shetland	John Henderson	BBC	2 episodes
2014	Atlantis	Miras	BBC	2 episodes
2014	Marvellous	Rev. McCoist		Television film
2015	The Musketeers	Levesque	BBC	Episode: "The Prodigal Father"
2015–2018; 2024	Outlander	Ian Murray	Starz	Recurring role, 11 episodes
2018	Hoff the Record	Mike Porridge	Dave	Episode: "Hostile Environment Training"
2019	MotherFatherSon	Andrew Bentham	BBC Two	3 episodes
2019	Deep Water	Joe Kallisto	ITV	Series regular, 6 episodes
2020	COBRA	Chief Constable Stuart Collier	Sky One	Series regular, 5 episodes
2020	A Discovery of Witches	Gallowglass	Sky One	Series regular, 6 episodes
2023	The Diplomat	Sam Henderson	Alibi	Series regular, 6 episodes
2026	Vigil	Gordon Laity	BBC One	Series 3; 4 episodes

=== Film ===
Year	Title	Character	Notes
2009	Vivaldi, the Red Priest	Antonio Vivaldi	Condor Pictures Film
2009	Closing Doors	Robert	Short film/Independent
2010	The Gardener of God	The Rabbi	Condor Pictures Film
2010	4.3.2.1.	Scotty	
2010	Huge	Trevor	
2010	Rojin	Hotel Manager	Short film
2011	The Awakening	Sergeant Evans	Independent film
2011	The Swarm	Tom	Short film
2012	John Carter	Humble Guard	
2012	Brave	Young Macintosh (voice)	
2012	Tower Block	DC Devlin	
2012	The Knot	Steve	
2012	Having You	Paul	
2013	Fish Love	Matt	Short film/Featured at the London Short Film Festival
2014	300: Rise of an Empire	Decapitated Greek marine	
2014	Maleficent	Overseer	
2015	Swung	Mike	
2015	Legacy	Damien	
2015	51 Degrees North	Michael Burlington	
2015	The Rat King	Jordan	Short film/Independent. Nominated for Best Short at the Edinburgh International Film Festival
2016	Brotherhood	Brick	
2017	Churchill	Captain James Stagg	
2018	The Titan	Mjr. Timothy Pike	
2018	2036 Origin Unknown	ARTi (voice)	
2018	Outlaw King	Sir Christopher Seton	Netflix Original
2018	The Little Princess	The Man	Written by Steven Cree. Featured at the San Luis Obispo International Film Festival
2019	Terminator: Dark Fate	Rigby	
2021	Martyrs Lane	Thomas	
2022	The Twin	Anthony	
2024	Deadline	Stephen Miller	Short film
2024	Bagman	Liam McKee	
2024	All of You	Lukas	
2025	Heads of State	Agent Crasson	
2025	I Swear	David Davidson	
2026	Queen at Sea	Jonathan	

=== Theatre ===
Year	Title	Role	Director	Theatre
2004	Fierce: An Urban Myth	Choonz	Janinie Abbott	Tron Theater
2005	The Real Thing	Brodie	Tim Pigott-Smith	Richmond Theatre
2007	Cabaret	Cliff Bradshaw	Rufus Norris	Lyric Theatre
2011	Company	Peter	Jonathan Munby	Crucible Theatre
2013	Macbeth	Lennox	Kenneth Branagh & Rob Ashford	Park Avenue Armory (Broadcast live worldwide on 20 July 2013)

=== Voice ===
Year	Genre	Title	Role	Notes
2018	Video game	Forza Horizon 4	Alex Strachan	
2020	Video game	Bravely Default II	Elvis	
2021	Video game	Forza Horizon 5	Alex Strachan	
2023	Audiobook	The Wee Free Men	The Nac Mac Feegles	
2023	Audiobook	A Hat Full of Sky	The Nac Mac Feegles	
2023	Audiobook	Wintersmith	The Nac Mac Feegles	
2023	Audiobook	I Shall Wear Midnight	The Nac Mac Feegles	
2023	Audiobook	The Shepherd's Crown	The Nac Mac Feegles	

== Awards and nominations ==
Year	Award	Category	Nominated work	Result
2019	Omaha Film Festival Audience Award	Best Short Film (with Jason Maza)	The Little Princess	Won
2019	George Sidney Independent Film Competition	Best Narrative Short (with Jason Maza)	The Little Princess	Won
