= Palm Theatre, San Luis Obispo =

Movie theater in San Luis Obispo, California, United States

Coordinates: 35.2815°N 120.66376°W

The Palm Theatre is an independent movie theater in the historic Chinatown district of San Luis Obispo, California.

== Origins ==
The Palm Theatre was founded by Jim and Patty Dee in 1988. The pair first opened The Rainbow, San Luis Obispo's first art house cinema, in 1979. In 1988, wanting to expand, they opened The Palm Theatre, however running both theaters simultaneously proved untenable and The Rainbow closed its doors in 1989.

== Early years ==
In August 1988, Dee opened the Palm Theatre in downtown San Luis Obispo. Dee's wife, Patty, served as contractor when the couple renovated the building that had previously been occupied by the San Luis Obispo Employment Development Department. Originally constructed in 1955, the building was not built as a theater, which led to a somewhat unorthodox setup. The building has three screens and a seating capacity of 268, the largest screen seating 124, and two smaller screens seating 89 and 39 each, a small seating capacity compared to many other theaters. Due to the preexisting structure of the building, the Palm Theatre was forced to construct three separate projection rooms, each of which project to a single screen, unlike the typical modern theater with a single projection room that projects to all screens.

The first few years of the Palm Theatre's operation proved difficult. The transformation of a public service building to movie theater was difficult and expensive, and the theater was not drawing large crowds to its mainly independent and arthouse selections. Dee had hoped the proximity to both California Polytechnic State University and Cuesta College would provide a substantial student population interested in independent cinema, but this wasn't the case.

Financial problems stemming from disagreements with the landlord were resolved as the early 1990s saw a slight resurgence in the popularity of smaller budget films such as “Working Girl,” and "Accidental Choice." In 1992 and 1993, business for the Palm Theatre increased dramatically.

== Present day ==
The Palm Theatre specializes in showing independent, foreign, and arthouse films, but often shows low-budget mainstream films, such as 2007's Juno, which became the Palm Theatre's most successful showing, and was brought back to the theater for extended run. The theater's selections are chosen by Dee, who prefers films that are “below radar,” and seeks cinematic advice from the theater's patrons. The Palm Theatre has also been made available for Cal Poly film classes, as the university does not have the facilities for screening 35 mm prints.

Over the past few years, independent theaters across the nation have struggled, and have accused larger theater chains of lobbying Hollywood studios to blackball independent theaters by withholding popular films upon their initial release. Many of the more mainstream films shown at the Palm Theatre are presented during the “second run,” or after they have been pulled from larger theaters. In recent years, showing movies during their second run has become difficult due to the choice of many Hollywood studios to shorten the time between a film's first run and its DVD release in an effort to increase their profits and combat piracy.

Dee was the subject of an article in the Los Angeles Times entitled, "Art of Survival at the Art House." The article reported on the decline of independent film distribution networks relying on the waning influence of the Sundance Film Festival: "Sundance is at one end of the indie food chain: the Palm is at the other."

Despite the Palm's location in the popular downtown San Luis Obispo shopping area, and the presence of two colleges in the city, student patrons do not provide for a substantial amount of the theater's revenues. Due to the theater's choice to often show more esoteric films, the Palm Theatre has continually had a difficult time attracting the college community. It is the senior citizen population of San Luis Obispo and the surrounding communities in the area that frequently fill the seats on Saturday and Sunday afternoons.

== San Luis Obispo International Film Festival ==
The Palm Theatre has participated in the San Luis Obispo International Film Festival (SLOIFF) since its inception in 1993. Jim Dee, the owner and founder of the Palm Theatre, was one of five co-founders of the SLO International Film Festival, the others being Mary Harris, Cathy Peacock, Lee Cogan, and Dee's wife Patty Dee. In 2007, the theatre had its largest role in the festival to date, holding over 90 percent of the festivals screenings.

The Festival began as a week-long event to celebrate director George Sidney and other classic films that had long been out of theatres. SLOIFF is now a week-long venue for independent film makers to present their films to an audience and receive live feedback. While the Palm Theatre is a main player in the festival, other local theaters such as The Fremont and San Luis Obispo Little Theatre participate in showing some films.

The SLOIFF hands out several awards each year. The King Vidor Award, named for local resident and historic filmmaker King Vidor (1894–1982), is given to actors and filmmakers for their artistic achievements in films. Past winners include Jim Dee, who received the honor in 1999 for being the long-time owner of the Palm Theatre and for supporting the SLOIFF every year since 1993, and actor Morgan Freeman who won in 2006.

== Notes ==
Works cited

- Davis, J, Tull, A, Underwood, M. (2008). [Interview with Jim Dee, Owner of the Palm Theatre].
- Freitas, S. The Palm: solar-powered cinema. (2007, Feb. 12). Mustang Daily, p. Spotlight.
