= Stephen Sutton =

British activist (1994–2014)

Stephen Sutton MBE
- Sutton in 2014
- Born: Stephen Robert Sutton; 16 December 1994; Burntwood, England
- Died: 14 May 2014 (aged 19); Birmingham, England
- Cause of death: Cancer
- Occupations: Blogger, charity activist
- Website: Sutton's JustGiving page Stephen's Story

Stephen Robert Sutton MBE (16 December 1994 – 14 May 2014), was an English blogger and charity activist known for his blog Stephen's Story and his fundraising efforts for the Teenage Cancer Trust charity for the aid of teenagers with cancer. By the second anniversary of his death, £5.5 million had been raised in his memory.

Sutton performed well at school, but withdrew his applications to university in 2012 after his terminal prognosis for colorectal cancer. His father had fought the disease twice, and both were predisposed to it through Lynch syndrome. Sutton had struggled to get a diagnosis, as doctors did not believe that colorectal cancer could occur in someone so young. He made a "bucket list" of things to do in his final months and achieved many of them, such as becoming a Guinness World Records holder. He began fundraising for the Teenage Cancer Trust, receiving support from celebrities and politicians. In 2013, he met filmmaker Grigorij Richters, who recorded him for a documentary.

Sutton died on 14 May 2014 at the age of 19. A memorial service to him at Lichfield Cathedral was attended by over 10,000 mourners. After his death, he was posthumously recognised for his activism with awards, including being made an MBE and receiving an honorary doctorate from Coventry University.

== Early life ==
Stephen Robert Sutton was born on 16 December 1994 in Burntwood, where he attended Highfields Primary School and Chase Terrace Technology College. He was a very active child, participating in sports and athletics, particularly long-distance running and football. He had a trial at Walsall F.C. at one point, and set a record in the under-15 400 m run at his school. Despite receiving chemotherapy during exams, Sutton did well academically, and had interviews at Cambridge University to study medicine. He later withdrew his applications before getting a verdict when his colorectal cancer was determined to be incurable.

Like his father Andy, Sutton had Lynch syndrome, a genetic predisposition to colorectal cancer. His father had surgery to remove part of his intestine after a cancer diagnosis in 1989. 20 years later, he had another tumour removed and a second course of chemotherapy, receiving the all-clear only months before his son was first diagnosed. Doctors initially diagnosed him with constipation and prescribed laxatives, despite his father's insistence that there was a risk of colorectal cancer in the family; he was repeatedly told that teenagers were too young to have the illness. In his final interview, Sutton confessed that he had a degree of "anger" towards the amount of time taken for his cancer diagnosis, but would not lament it.

== Illness and activism ==
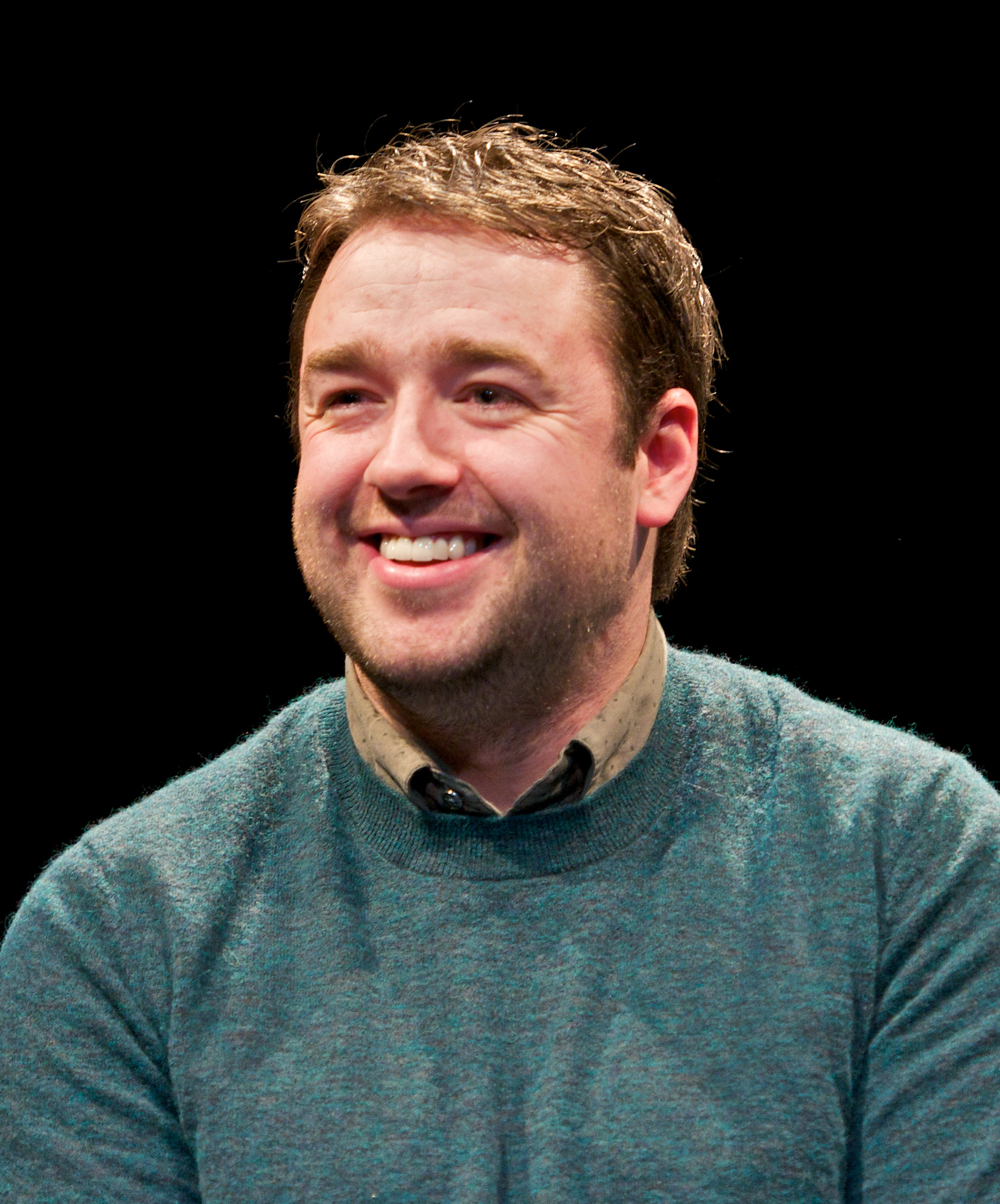
Comedian Jason Manford is an active supporter of Sutton's campaign

Sutton was diagnosed with stage 3B colorectal cancer at the age of 15, and subsequently went through aggressive radiation and chemotherapy treatments. He was declared cancer-free, but a tumour returned behind his knee, which was treated by further chemotherapy. Doctors considered an amputation of Sutton's left leg, but the tumour had already spread to other parts of his lower body. In December 2012, two years after the initial diagnosis, the cancer was deemed incurable after spreading to the lungs and liver. Sutton did not ask how long he was expected to survive, choosing to measure his life in the difference he could make, rather than in time. On 24 January 2014, in a speech at London's O2 Arena, he called his first diagnosis "a good thing. It was a huge kick up the backside, it taught me to take nothing for granted, and gave me a lot of motivation for life".

After his diagnosis, Sutton began participating in charity events with the Teenage Cancer Trust, and later started his own website and blog in January 2013. At the same time, he began fundraising for the trust, with an initial goal of £10,000. Following unexpected support, the goal was raised to £100,000 and £500,000 the same year, before being raised to £1,000,000 in March 2014 and went over the £4,000,000 mark by the end of May 2014. During his fundraising campaign, Sutton was supported by several celebrities, most notably Jimmy Carr, Jonathan Ross and Jason Manford. Manford donated £10,000 and gave all the turnover from his own comedy clubs for the entire month of May to the charity. Following Sutton's hospitalisation in April 2014, Manford became the unofficial spokesperson for the charity, appearing in interviews promoting the cause. He also launched the campaign "#thumbsupforStephen", asking people to share selfies of themselves promoting the campaign.

Sutton's goal of £1,000,000 was reached on 23 April 2014, and on 2 May, he was discharged from the hospital following an improvement in his condition. Later that same day he also met with prime minister David Cameron, who voiced his support for the campaign. On 4 May, Sutton helped break the Guinness World Record for 'The most number of people making heart-shaped hand gestures', with 554 people at Chase Terrace Technology College.

In September 2014, £2.9 million of the £4.96 million raised was invested in specialist cancer units for young people at seven British hospitals. A further £1.2 million was put towards 50 care scholarships at Coventry University, and £700,000 invested in improving cancer awareness information and helping patients attend the charity's annual weekend conference. On 14 May 2016, the second anniversary of Sutton's death, £5.5 million had been raised.

Skydiving and entering the Guinness Book of Records were two goals which Sutton achieved before his death. On 10 July 2015 at Hibaldstow Airfield in Lincolnshire, 402 people made 403 tandem jumps of at least 10,000 feet in 24 hours for the Teenage Cancer Trust in his honour, breaking the previous record of 286. His mother, an official ambassador for the trust, also ran a marathon and in 2016 announced plans to climb Mount Kilimanjaro in her son's memory.

== Documentary ==
In April 2013, Sutton met Kevin Spacey's filmmaker-in-residence Grigorij Richters while rehearsing as part of the drummer group for the opening ceremony of the 2013 UEFA Champions League final at Wembley Stadium. They quickly became friends. Richters and his team began following him around for several months, filming Sutton at home with his family and at several fundraisers. In the summer of 2013 Sutton went on holiday to Ibiza (his last travel) with his close friends. Richters equipped him with several GoPro cameras. The documentary is in development, as of 2016, and will be made into a feature-length film. Richters said, "Two days before Stephen passed we talked about his legacy. He wanted to make sure that we remember him as the positive person he was and not as a cancer sufferer."

Besides making the documentary for Sutton, Richters and his team were tasked to rebrand his Facebook page and have been managing most of his media and backend.

The opening ceremony, titled "The Battle of Kings", was directed by Spacey's executive assistant and Prince's Trust ambassador Hamish Jenkinson and his business partner Jonny Grant, who had previously directed the opening ceremony at the same venue for the 2011 final. It was produced by Films United, and directed and produced by Richters and his producing partner Alex Souabni. Both were the former filmmakers-in-residence of Spacey and Jenkinson at The Old Vic Theatre in London. The film focused on the story of Sutton, who was part of the group of performers.

Ceremonies manager Julien Pateau spoke about Sutton after his death:

"I met with Stephen a year ago at Wembley; I couldn't believe how committed he was to following his dream – being part of the 400 drummers we had last year for the opening ceremony. I remember on the eve of the ceremony, his knee was hurting him so bad that he couldn't walk without crutches. He was watching the dress rehearsal from the stands with a constant smile on his face and told me: 'Don't worry, Julien: tomorrow I'll be there whatever it takes!' Indeed, he took a double dose of painkillers and performed with all his passion for our ceremony. Stephen inspired me. I'm so proud to have met you and to have been even just a small part of your story".

== Death and reaction ==
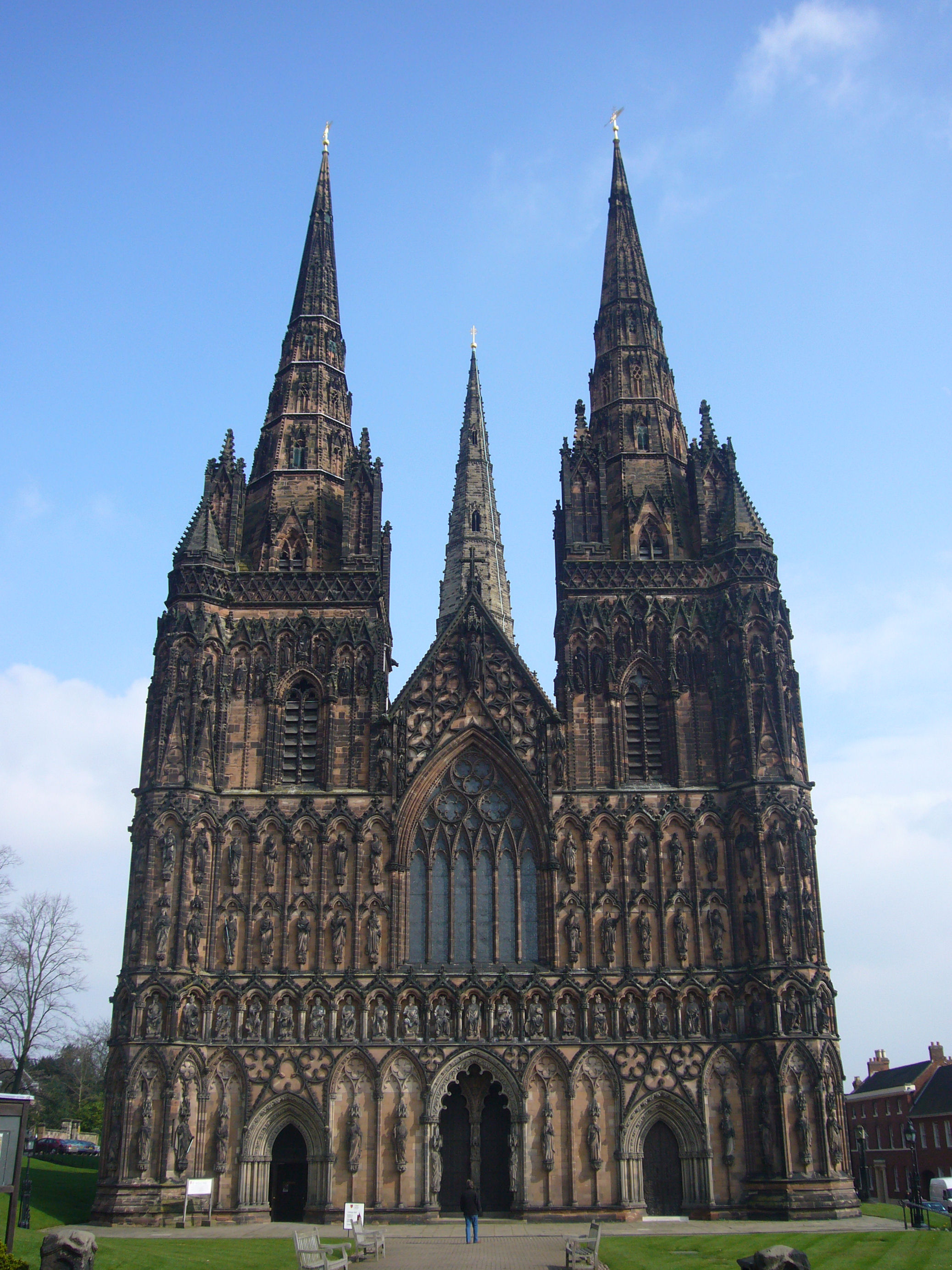
A public vigil for Sutton was held at Lichfield Cathedral in Staffordshire

Following a lung collapse on 22 April 2014, Sutton was put on life-support but in a stable condition. He died of colorectal cancer in his sleep at Queen Elizabeth Hospital in Birmingham during the early hours of 14 May 2014, at the age of 19. His death was announced on his Facebook page by his mother. His elder brother Chris wrote on Twitter:

"I could sit here all day typing words like inspirational, proud, but frankly his life and what he achieved speaks for itself, it doesn't need a rambling eulogy from me. He'll still always be a bit of tw*t to me, hey he was my younger brother, it’s in the contract, but I was blessed to grow up with the best little tw*t you could have".

By the time of his death, he had raised over £3.2 million for the Teenage Cancer Trust. David Cameron praised Sutton for his "spirit and bravery" while Opposition Leader Ed Miliband said Sutton was an "inspiration". Miliband said:

"Stephen Sutton was the most inspiring person I've ever met and touched more lives than he will ever know. He was an incredibly positive young man and a credit to his family, to Burntwood and to humanity itself. The reason we took to him so passionately was because he was better than us; he did something that none of us could even imagine doing. In his darkest hour he selflessly dedicated his final moments to raising millions of pounds for teenagers with cancer. Some of Stephen's words will stay with me and others for ever and they are words to live by – 'life isn't measured in time, it's measured in achievements'".

On 21 May, Lichfield Cathedral announced that they would hold a public vigil for Sutton on 29 May, before a private family funeral the following day. In accordance with Sutton's wishes, those in attendance were told to wear bright colours and have fun; yellow, the colour of the summer, was advised. Around 11,000 people attended his vigil, with the Cathedral's Dean, Adrian Dorber, telling the BBC that the degree of public grief was akin to that of the death of Princess Diana. He was buried the next day.

== Posthumous recognition ==
=== Awards and honours ===
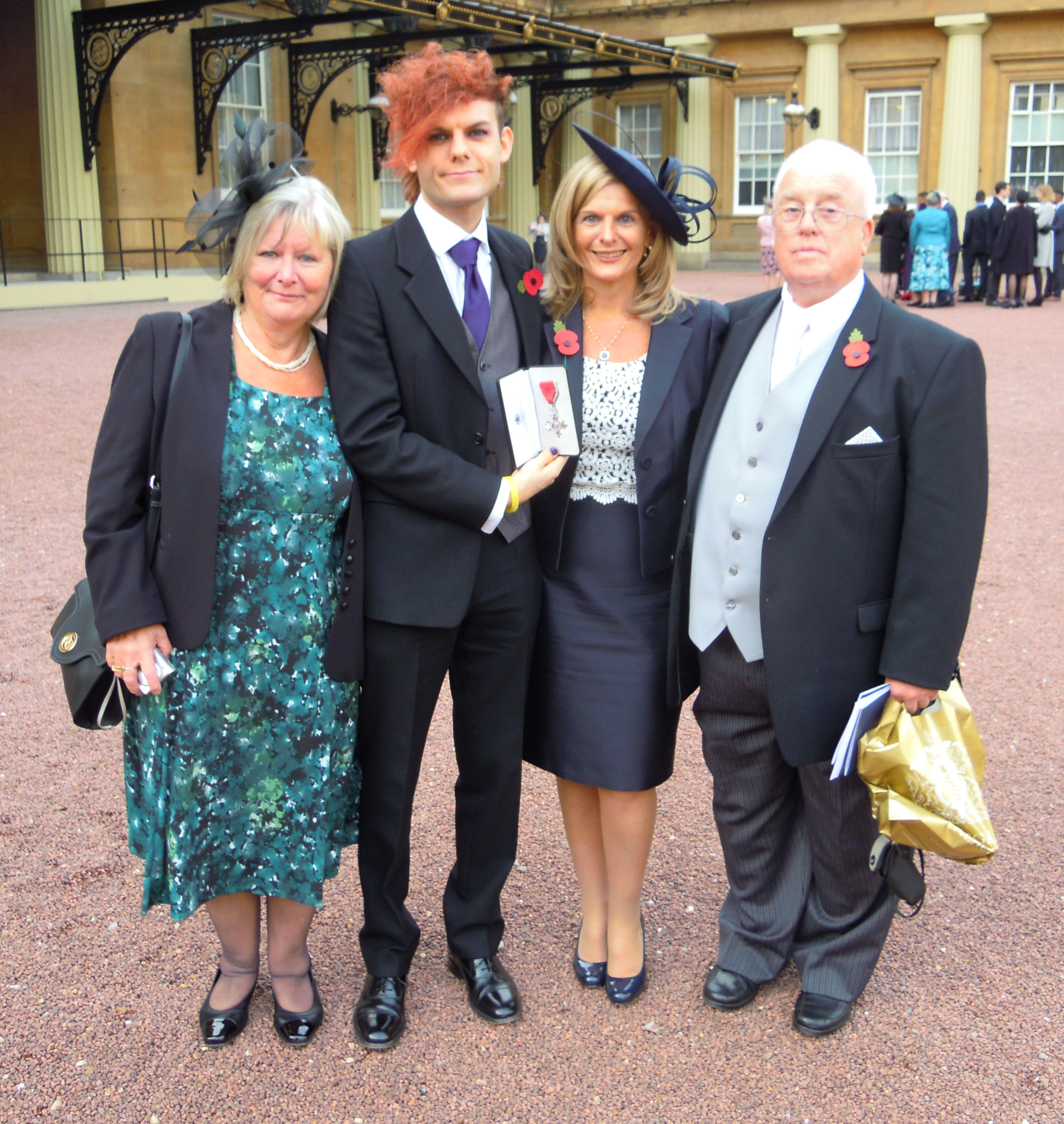
Sutton's mother Jane (second from right) and members of his family after receiving his MBE insignia in November 2014 at Buckingham Palace

Sutton was appointed Member of the Order of the British Empire (MBE) in the 2014 Birthday Honours "for services to Teenage Cancer Trust Charity"; the award was dated 14 May. His mother, Jane, said that "though Stephen continually told all of us that he didn't do charity work for recognition, even he acknowledged that to be appointed a Member of the Order of the British Empire was awesome". Jane received the MBE insignia from Queen Elizabeth II at Buckingham Palace in November 2014.

On 7 October 2014, Sutton was recognised at the Pride of Britain Awards with the award for "Special Recognition". It was presented to his family by Jason Manford and Roger Daltrey.

On 11 November 2014 Coventry University announced that it would posthumously award Sutton with an Honorary Doctorate of Science, in recognition of his outstanding contribution to highlighting the unique needs of teenagers and young adults with cancer. His mother collected it on his behalf later that month.

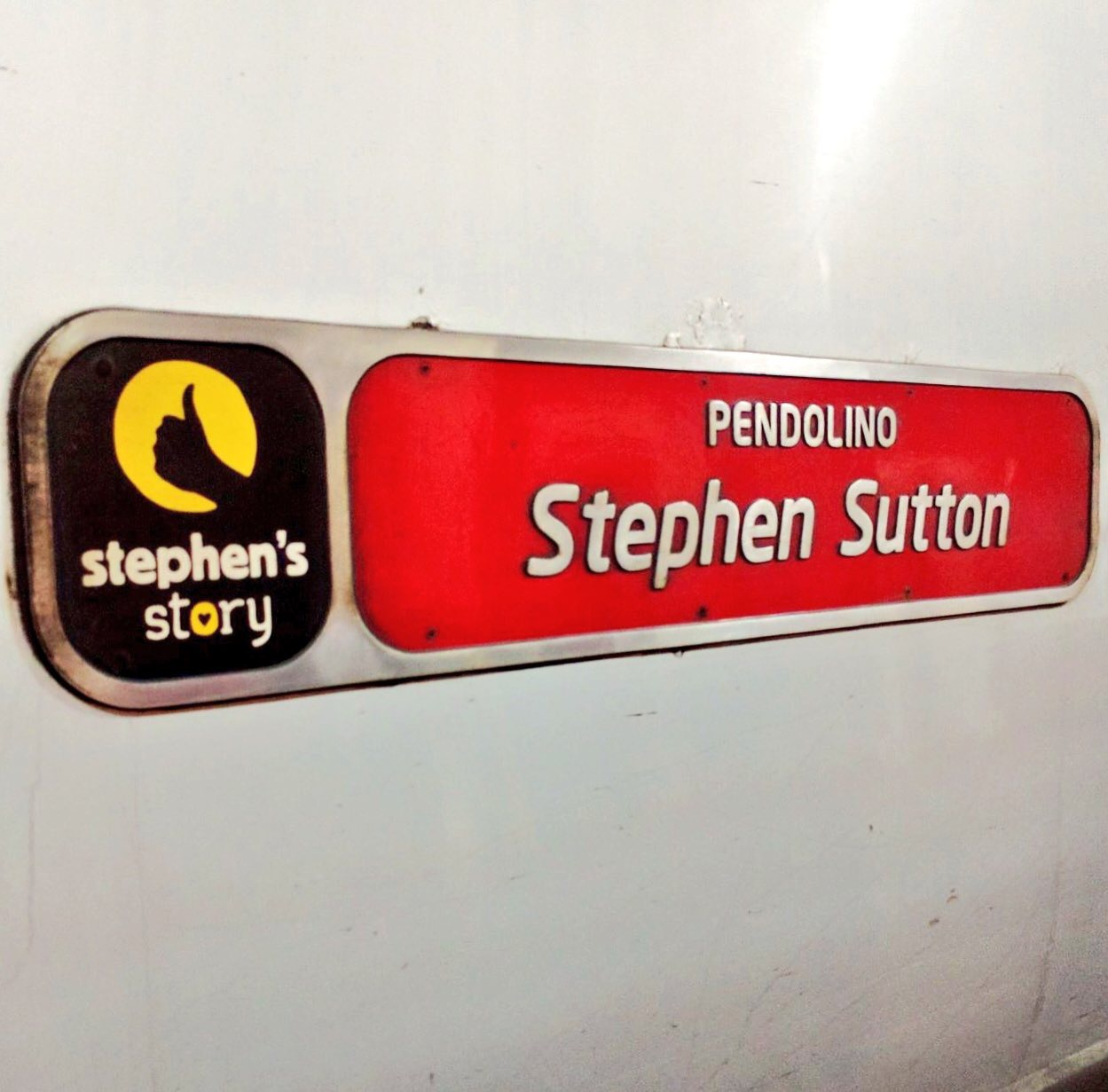
Virgin Trains' Pendolino named after Sutton

Burntwood's Christmas tree for 2014 was dedicated to Sutton, and decorated with yellow ribbons. In September 2015, Virgin Trains renamed Pendolino 390 002 in his honour. In June 2014, an elephant at the West Midland Safari Park was named Sutton by public vote; he had previously met the animal's mother as part of a wish to hug an animal larger than himself.

=== Music ===
The Neon Brotherhood recorded a single titled "Hope Ain't a Bad Thing" as a fundraiser for Teenage Cancer Trust in memory of Sutton. Jane Sutton announced the release of the single on 2 June and within 24 hours the song reached No. 2 on UK iTunes Charts. It peaked in the Official UK charts at No. 16.

After working with Sutton, local community organisation Gig Caritas announced that they would hold a concert in memory of him in Dudley, featuring West End stars Kieran Brown, Sabrina Aloueche and Katie Bernstein accompanied by a professional orchestra and choir made up of members from In Sound Company and Brierley Hill Musical Theatre Company.

In 2014, the Download Festival paid tribute to Sutton, temporarily naming their main stage after him. He attended the festival in 2013 as part of his "bucket list".
