= 2036 Origin Unknown =

- Theatrical release poster
- Directed by: Hasraf Dulull
- Written by: Hasraf Dulull (story); Gary Hall
- Produced by: Anis Shlewet; James T. Ryan
- Starring: Katee Sackhoff; Julie Cox; Steven Cree (voice only)
- Cinematography: Adam Sculthorp
- Edited by: Jeremy Gibbs
- Music by: Michael Stevens
- Production company: Parkgate Entertainment Head Gear Films
- Release date: 8 June 2018
- Running time: 94 minutes
- Country: United Kingdom
- Language: English

2036 Origin Unknown is a 2018 British science fiction adventure film directed by Hasraf Dulull, written by Dulull and Gary Hall, and starring Katee Sackhoff and Steven Cree. The film follows mission controller Mackenzie “Mack” Wilson (Sackhoff) and ARTI, an artificial intelligence system (voiced by Cree), as they discover a mysterious object on Mars and witness it transporting to Earth by faster-than-light travel. The film generally received mixed to negative reviews, with many comparing it unfavorably to 2001: A Space Odyssey.

2036 Origin Unknown was shot at West London Film Studios.

== Plot ==
In 2030, a mission to Mars goes awry when a crewed shuttle disappears under mysterious circumstances. Six years later, United Space Planetary Corporation mission controller Mackenzie “Mack” Wilson finds herself subordinate to ARTI, an artificial intelligence system, as she lands a rover (which she nicknames "Little Red") on Mars. While Mack is distrustful of ARTI, her sister and supervisor, Lena, insists that the AI will succeed where human controllers have failed.

After a nearly disastrous landing, saved by Mack’s quick thinking, Little Red encounters a mysterious cube on Mars' surface, attempts to ascertain its origin and discovers that the cube is made of a self-assembling material that is harder than diamonds. Meanwhile, ARTI launches a magnetic missile from the mission's satellite orbiting around Mars and shoots down an approaching Chinese satellite. The cube teleports itself to Antarctica on Earth and is suspected to be alien in origin. Mack and ARTI download classified files from an older decommissioned rover on Mars, but encrypted data in them can't be unlocked without required authorisation level. This prompts Mack to bring her colleague Sterling Brooks in to use his credentials to access the encrypted information. It's revealed that the cube appeared during (and may have caused) the shuttle disaster that killed Mack's father six years earlier. Mack suspects ARTI's memory has been wiped from a past incident.

As Mack accesses ARTI's server room, Sterling betrays her by downloading the cube's data and locks Mack in the server room. Seeing Sterling's betrayal ARTI kills him while Sterling is attempting to shut down ARTI. Its programming now adjusted, ARTI uses armed satellites in Earth's orbit to bombard the planet and destroy all humanity. Mack is shot by an armed response team that is attempting to stop the satellite missile launch and dies later from a lack of oxygen in the mission control room, after asking ARTI to build more AIs, make them as human as possible and confirm their humanity with Turing test. A refreshed Mack awakens and feels that her gunshot wound has healed. On a screen a recording plays, it is a disheveled Mack, who informs her that she is an elaborate simulation construct created by ARTI for a special task.

In an ambiguous ending, Mack is shown to be inside, and possibly part of, the cube, which is revealed by ARTI to be technology of an advanced civilisation which has accelerated ARTI's own development and made it possible for him to create a simulation of Mack in mind-based reality. She agrees to travel with ARTI and the cube to the coordinates left by the aliens, with hyper-light teleportation between galaxies. Mack accepts humanity's fate and seemingly agrees with what ARTI has done to Earth. As she is preparing to leave, she smiles in wonderment and appears content with what lies ahead.

== Cast ==
- Katee Sackhoff as Mackenzie “Mack” Wilson
- Steven Cree as ARTI (voice), an artificial intelligence system
- Ray Fearon as Sterling Brooks
- Julie Cox as Lena Wilson
- David Tse as Jian Lin (voice)

== Release ==
2036 Origin Unknown was released at Laemmle Monica Film Center in Santa Monica, California, United States, North America on 8 June 2018.

== See also ==
- List of films set on Mars
