= The Neon Brotherhood =

"Hope Ain't a Bad Thing"

Single by The Neon Brotherhood
- Released: June 2014
- Recorded: 2014
- Label: Neon Sound Studios
- Songwriter(s): Martin Stanyer; Mike Newey
- Producer(s): Mike Newey

The Neon Brotherhood are a group of 40 people who got together to release the single "Hope Ain't a Bad Thing" in aid of Stephen Sutton who died on 14 May 2014.

The song gained a midweek position of number 5 before its final place at number 16 on the UK Singles Chart on 8 June 2014. The song also made Ireland Singles Chart at number 58. The song was written by Martin Stanyer and Mike Newey, and recorded at Neon Sound Studios in Burntwood, Staffordshire. The Neon Brotherhood opened V Festival on the main stage at Weston Park on August 16, 2014. Glynn Morgan who sang for Threshold also features on the track.

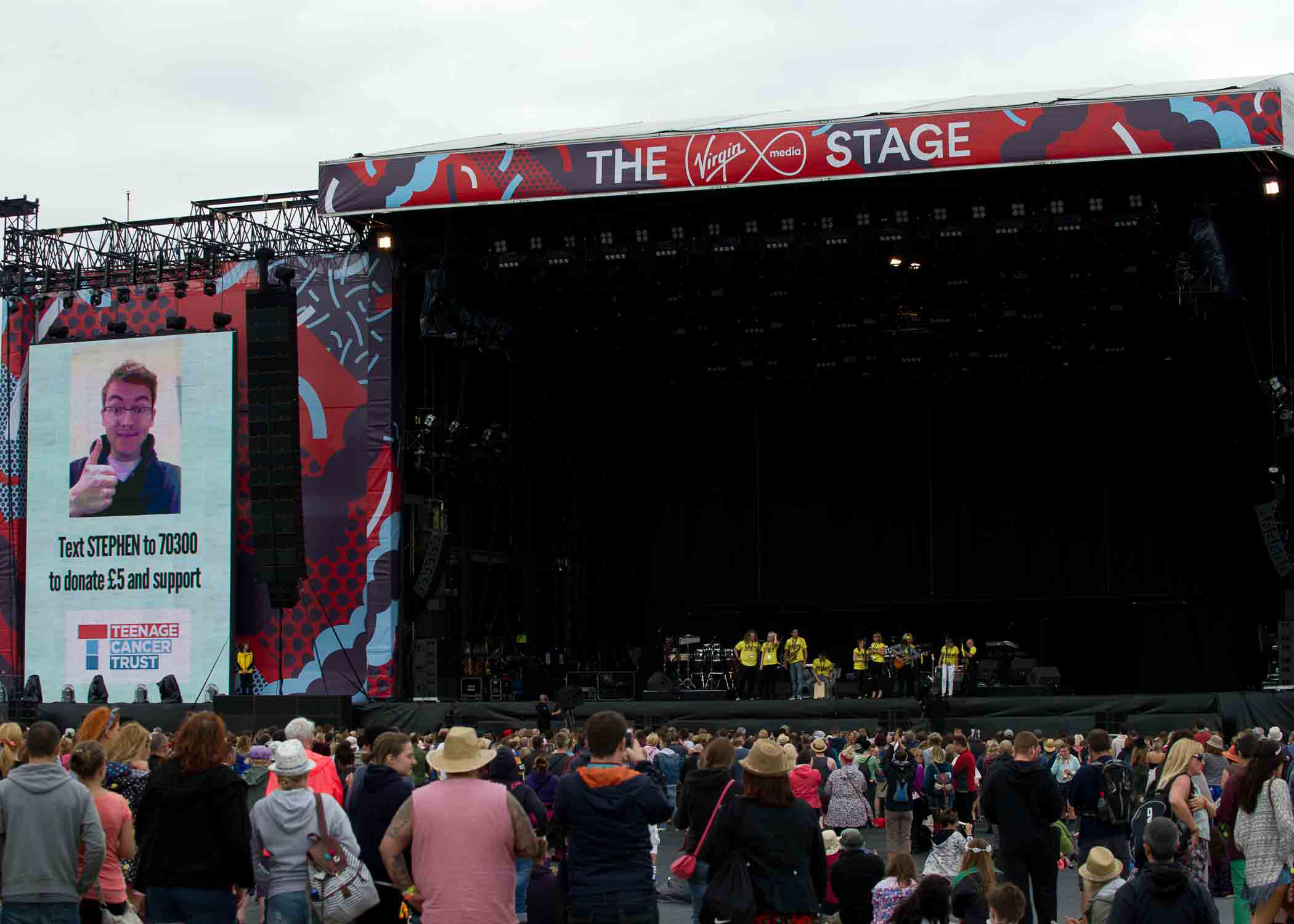
Neon Brotherhood live at V Festival

The song's speech by Sutton at the end was originally recorded for a charity Christmas song called "This Christmas" by songwriter Martin Stanyer's band, Naked Sunday.

== Chart success ==
Year	Single	UK	IRE
2014	"Hope Ain't a Bad Thing"	16	58
