= Hurtwood House =

School in Dorking, Surrey, England

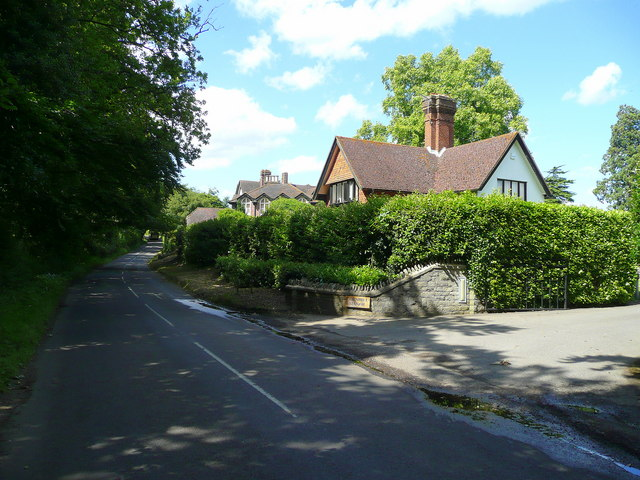
- Shere Road, Ewhurst The lodge is part of the Cornhill Manor estate, which itself is part of Hurtwood House School.

Location
- Holmbury St Mary; Dorking, Surrey, RH5 6NU; England; 51°10′28″N 0°25′34″W

Information
- Type: Private school boarding school
- Established: 1970
- Local authority: Surrey County Council
- Department for Education URN: 125442 Tables
- Headmaster: Cosmo Jackson
- Gender: Mixed
- Age range: 15–19
- Enrolment: 344 (2018)
- Capacity: 350
- Website: www.hurtwoodhouse.com

Hurtwood House is a private, independent, co-educational boarding school and sixth form for pupils aged 15–19, near Dorking, Surrey, England.

== Synopsis ==
Founded in 1970 by Richard Jackson, the main house is an Edwardian mansion set in 200 acres (0.81 km^{2}) in the Surrey Hills. The intern students, aged 16–19, organise their studies and leisure in 6 houses: The Hurtwood Main House, The Lodge, Peaslake House, Ewhurst Place, Beatrice Webb House and Cornhill Manor.

Until 2008, the school used Leith Hill Place as a boarding house for students. They purchased Cornhill Manor towards Ewhurst village proper, which is a mainly rural clustered village, ready for the start of the 2007-2008 academic school year. Each house has its own grounds.

The school, which is non-denominational, offers a two-year pre-university course for students typically aged 16 to 19, mainly focused on GCE 'A' levels.

There are approximately 363 students, divided equally between boys and girls. There is also a high proportion of overseas students who attend the school, notably from the United States and Asia.

In 2009 the school had the highest post-16 contextual value added score of any school in the UK. This takes into account the achievement of students on entry and measures the improvements they make during their courses of study.

== Notable alumni ==
- Hans Zimmer, composer
- Emily Blunt, actress
- Cleo von Adelsheim, actress
- Nikki Amuka-Bird, actress
- Maxim Baldry, actor
- Kate Aumonier, singer
- Harry Lawtey, actor
- Emily Beecham, actress
- Phoebe Boswell, artist/film maker
- Amelia Brightman, singer
- Amelia Curtis, actress
- Hannah Herzsprung, actress
- Jack Huston, actor
- Ella Mills, food writer and businesswoman
- Tom Mison, actor
- Ben Radcliffe, actor
- Grigorij Richters, activist and filmmaker
- Joshua Sasse, actor
- Tengku Muhammad Fakhry Petra, Crown Prince of Kelantan, Malaysia
- Ward Thomas, band
- Princess Sarah Zeid, health advocate
- Ania Magliano, comedian and actress
