= The Twin (2022 film) =

2022 horror film

- Release poster
- Directed by: Taneli Mustonen
- Screenplay by: Aleksi Hyvärinen; Taneli Mustonen
- Produced by: Aleksi Hyvärinen
- Starring: Teresa Palmer; Steven Cree; Barbara Marten; Tristan Ruggeri
- Cinematography: Daniel Lindholm
- Edited by: Aleksi Raij; Toni Tikkanen
- Music by: Panu Aaltio
- Production company: Don Films
- Distributed by: Nordisk Film (Note: Nordisk Film released the film in Finland.); Shudder (Note: Shudder released the film in the United States.); RLJE Films (Note: RLJE Films released the film in the United States.)
- Release dates: March 24, 2022 (Night Visions); April 6, 2022 (Finland); May 6, 2022 (United States)
- Running time: 109 minutes
- Country: Finland
- Language: English
- Budget: €2.2 million
- Box office: $1.6 million

The Twin is a 2022 psychological horror film directed by Taneli Mustonen. The original screenplay is written by Taneli Mustonen and Aleksi Hyvärinen, who also produced the film. The film tells a story about a mother, who has to confront the unbearable truth about her surviving twin son. The film stars Teresa Palmer and Steven Cree.

== Plot ==
A woman named Rachel, her husband Anthony, and their son Elliot have moved to Finland from New York in order to deal with the grief of losing Elliot's twin brother Nathan in a car accident. During an excursion Elliot discovers a wall purported to grant wishes and makes a secret wish. Shortly thereafter he begins talking to an invisible person. Rachel attends a welcome party held by the townspeople where she meets the town doctor and Helen, the latter of whom cryptically references Elliot's wish.

Elliot begins to exhibit increasingly disturbing behaviors, including him claiming that he is Nathan. An attempt by Rachel to get the town doctor to treat Elliot ends with him insisting that she is sick and needs therapy. Desperate for answers Rachel reaches out to Helen, who tells her that the town is part of a satanic cult. Helen further remarks that her dead husband was possessed by an evil entity that showed up in photographs. At home, Rachel takes photographs of Elliot and brings them to the town to get developed. Later she and Elliot hold a séance of sorts that is interrupted by the townspeople and Anthony, who inform her that they want to use Elliot as part of a ritual.

The following day, Rachel retrieves the photographs and is terrified when Elliot doesn't show up in any of the pictures. She takes them to Helen, who tells her that this is the demon taunting her. She convinces Rachel to take her to Elliot so she can try to save him, but upon meeting the boy Helen instead tells Rachel that she is sick. The two women are then surrounded by the townspeople. Rachel is sedated and forced to participate in a satanic ritual, after which she is again sedated. When she awakens, Rachel is locked in her room, but manages to escape after she hears Elliot call for help.

Anthony chases Rachel into the forest, where he reveals that Elliot does not exist. Rachel was trying to leave Anthony and take Nathan with her when the accident occurred. Out of a sense of grief and anger, she imagined a second son as a coping mechanism. Eager to avoid leaving Rachel in an asylum, he went along with the delusion and moved her to Finland to start over. "Elliot" then flees, insisting that Anthony is trying to kill him. Rachel follows him to a grain silo, where Anthony again tries to appeal to his wife by "killing" Elliot by submerging him in the grain. This instead results in Rachel accidentally killing Anthony in an attempt to stop him. She then tries digging Elliot out of the grain, only to find nothing.

A still-delusional Rachel later returns to New York. Despite visiting Nathan and Anthony's graves, she believes that they, along with Elliot, are still alive.

== Cast ==
- Teresa Palmer as Rachel
- Steven Cree as Anthony
- Barbara Marten as Helen
- Tristan Ruggeri as Elliot and Nathan
- Andres Dvinjaninov as Town Doctor

== Production ==
On March 2, 2021, it was announced that Teresa Palmer will star in a horror film for the Finnish production company Don Films. London-based sales agency Film Constellation handles world sales. The total budget of the film was €2.2 million, of which the Finnish Film Foundation's support consisted of approximately €390.000.

Principal photography began on March 18, 2021, in Finland and Estonia and concluded on April 28, 2021.

== Release ==
The world premiere of the film was on March 24, 2022, at the Night Visions film festival. In the United States, the film was streamed exclusively on Shudder starting May 6, 2022.

The film has been very successful in Latin America: in Mexico, the film gathered more than 110,000 viewers on its premiere, and in both Argentina and Peru, the film reached the Top 3 lists of the most watched.

== Reception ==
Critical reception for the film has been mixed. On the review aggregator website Rotten Tomatoes, 41% of 22 critics' reviews are positive, with an average rating of 5.4/10.

== See also ==
- Hatching (film)
- The Knocking (2022 film)
