= 51 Degrees North =

51° North
- Theatrical release poster
- Directed by: Grigorij Richters
- Written by: Grigorij Richters
- Produced by: Alexander Souabni; Grigorij Richters
- Starring: Moritz von Zeddelmann; Steven Cree; Steve Nallon; Jamie Doyle; Dolly-Ann Osterloh
- Cinematography: James Kinsman
- Edited by: David Milkins
- Music by: Brian May
- Release dates: 23 September 2014 (Starmus Festival); 30 June 2015
- Running time: 88 minutes
- Country: United Kingdom
- Language: English
- Budget: €10,000

51 Degrees North (sometimes stylized as 51° North) is a 2014 science-fiction film written and directed by Grigorij Richters and starring Moritz von Zeddelmann, Steve Nallon, Jamie Doyle, Dolly-Ann Osterloh, and Steven Cree. The film is visually presented as found footage shot from the perspective of various video recording devices, primarily from a handheld camcorder operated by the main characters and from CCTV cameras and social media. The original soundtrack was composed by Queen and Brian May.

== Plot ==
Damon Miller (Moritz von Zeddelmann) is a talented, young German filmmaker living in London who is grappling with the pressures of an impoverished profession and a dissolving relationship. He soon discovers that the Earth stands on the brink of an extraterrestrial disaster.

Damon is informed that the world will end in less than three weeks when a series of asteroids will strike the Earth. However, a glimmer of hope remains in the form of a secret spaceship orbiting the Earth that can house up to 2,000 people. In exchange for a ticket to this spaceship, they task Damon with documenting the final moments leading up to the asteroid strike.

Seeing an opportunity to save Ann and his unborn child and a chance to mend the rift his obsession has created, Damon accepts the assignment. As the end of days arrives, Damon watches London descend into madness, with families torn apart and friends lost. Armed only with his camera, Damon prepares to make the ultimate sacrifice to save the ones he loves.

== Cast ==
- Moritz von Zeddelmann as Damon Miller
- Steven Cree as Michael Burlington
- Steve Nallon as Professor Richards
- Jamie Doyle as Frank
- Dolly-Ann Osterloh as Ann
- Frenzi as Frenzi
- Snoopy as Snoopy

== Production ==
51° North was shot between 2011 and 2014 in and around London, initially using a skeleton crew and employing guerrilla filmmaking tactics. The crew included stunt coordinator Greg Powell whose previous credits include the James Bond, Harry Potter, and Jason Bourne franchises.

The film was one of the largest productions ever to shoot at Piccadilly Circus, featuring over 2,500 extras.

== Music ==
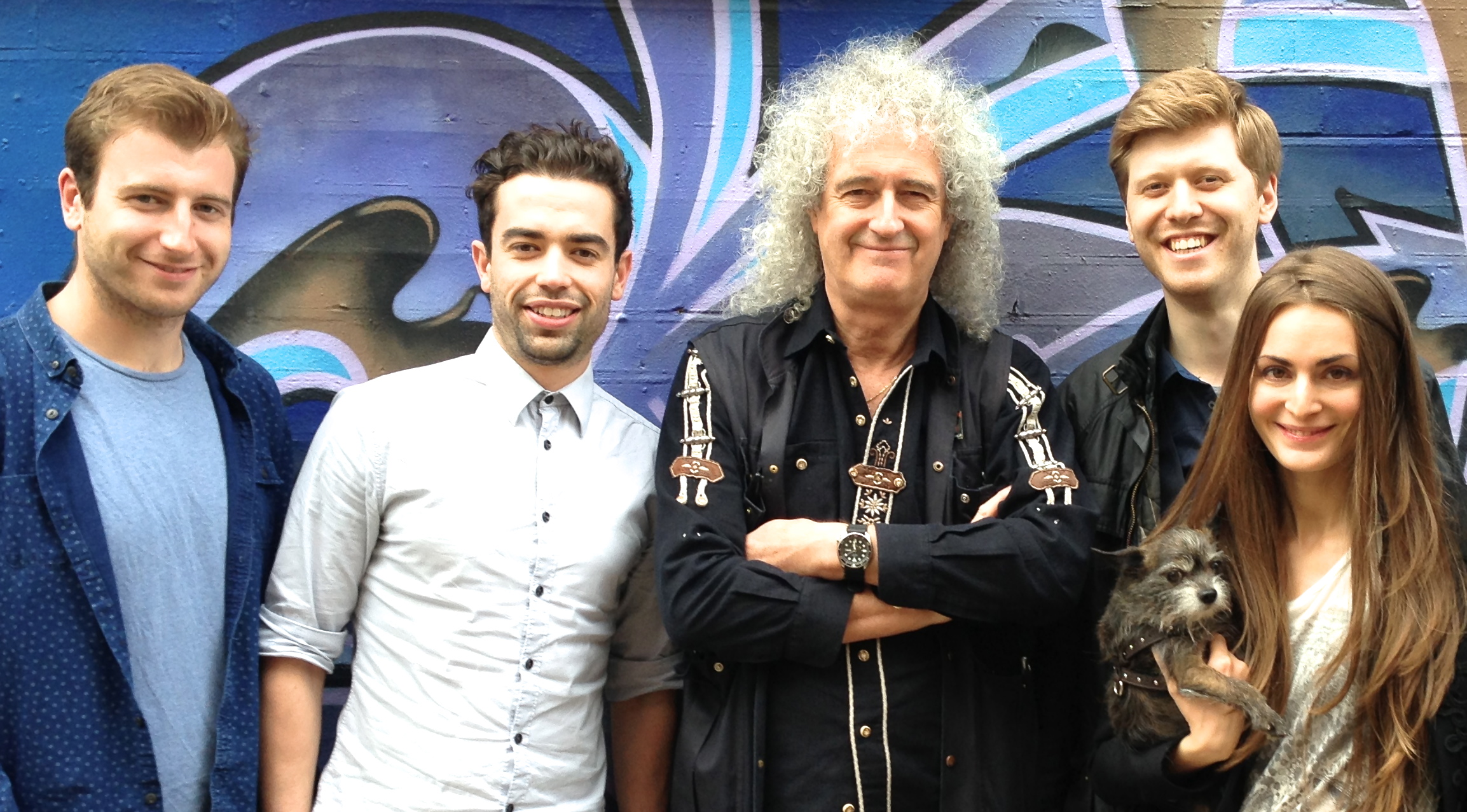
51° North Composer and Queen guitarist Brian May with the film's production team outside Sarm Studios after a recording session.

Brian May, guitarist of British rock band Queen composed the music for the film.

== Release ==
51° North headlined the 2014 Starmus Festival and was released on 30 June 2015.

== See also ==
- List of films featuring space stations
