= Vivaldi, the Red Priest =

2009 film by Liana Marabini

Vivaldi, the Red Priest (Italian: Vivaldi, il prete rosso) is an Italian television film, created and directed by Liana Marabini in 2009, about the life of composer Antonio Vivaldi, who was also a Catholic priest. It shows his relationship with the world, the Church, his spiritual battles and his love for a woman. This co-production between the UK and Italy has two episodes of 90 minutes, and intends to show the spiritual dimension of Vivaldi which is, according to the director, often ignored.

== Cast ==
- Steven Cree as Antonio Vivaldi
- Clemency Burton-Hill as Laura Padovan
- James Jagger as Alessandro Grimani
- Tiffany Mulheron as Anna Grimani
- Charity Wakefield as Ludovica
- Lachlan Nieboer as Brandon Perry
- Christian McKay as Estienne Roger
- Georgia King as Vittoria
- Matthew McNulty as Philippe d'Orléans
- Matt Barber as François
- Neil McDermott as Manfredi
- Anja Kruse
- Roberto Zibetti
- Sergio Leone
- Tuscia Nall Hollis
- Eric Alexander as Count of Berkley
- Elodie Hill as Little Elisabeth
