= Asteroid Day =

Global event on June 30 every year

- Asteroid Day logo
- Type: United Nations
- Date: June 30
- Frequency: Annual
- First time: 30 June 2015; 11 years ago

Asteroid Day (also known as International Asteroid Day) is an annual global event which is held on June 30, the anniversary of the Tunguska event in 1908 when a meteor air burst levelled about 2,150 km^{2} (830 mi^{2}) of forest in Siberia, Russia.

Asteroid Day was cofounded in 2014 (the year after the 2013 Chelyabinsk meteor air burst) by physicist Stephen Hawking, B612 Foundation president Danica Remy, Apollo 9 astronaut Rusty Schweickart, filmmaker Grigorij Richters, and Brian May (Queen guitarist and astrophysicist). Remy, Schweickart, Richters, and May initiated Asteroid Day in October 2014, which they announced during a press conference. It was launched on December 3, 2014.

In 2016, the United Nations proclaimed Asteroid Day be observed globally on June 30 every year in its resolution. The event aims to raise awareness about asteroids and what can be done to protect the Earth, its families, communities, and future generations from a catastrophic event. In 2026, the United States Senate passed S. Res. 792 by unanimous consent, designating June 30, 2026, as "Asteroid Day," sponsored by Senator Mark Kelly (D-AZ) with cosponsors Senator John Cornyn (R-TX) and Senator Jerry Moran (R-KS).

== Legacy ==
On Asteroid Day 2017, minor planet 248750 (discoverer M. Dawson) was officially named Asteroid Day by the International Astronomical Union.

== Asteroid Day declaration ==
In 2014, the workgroup of Asteroid Day created a declaration known as the "100X Declaration", which appeals to all scientists and technologists who support the idea of saving the Earth from asteroids. The 100X Declaration was signed by more than 22,000 private citizens, including those who are not specialists.

Although more than 1,000,000 asteroids have the potential to strike the Earth, only about one percent have been discovered. The 100X Declaration calls for increasing the asteroid discovery rate to 100,000 (or 100x) per year within the next 10 years. It is hoped that this will bolster efforts for addressing potential strikes.

The main three goals are:

1. Employ available technology to detect and track near-earth asteroids that threaten human populations via governments and private and philanthropic organizations.
2. A rapid hundred-fold acceleration of the discovery and tracking of near-earth asteroids to 100,000 per year within the next ten years.
3. Global adoption of Asteroid Day, heightening awareness of the asteroid hazard and our efforts to prevent impacts, on June 30 – With the United Nations recognition, this action item has been achieved.

== Asteroid Day 2015–2019 ==
According to information on asteroidday.org, there were over 2,000 events in its first five years of the day being announced, across 78 countries. 41 astronauts and cosmonauts participated in activities on the day. The general goal was to raise awareness about the threat posed by asteroid impacts. Institutions such as Institut de Ciències de l'Espai, the Natural History Museum in Vienna, the American Museum of Natural History, the California Academy of Sciences, the Science Museum in London, the SETI Institute, the European Space Agency, the UK Space Agency, among others participated in educational activities.

== United Nations ==
In February 2016, Romanian astronaut Dumitru Prunariu and the Association of Space Explorers submitted a proposal to the Scientific and Technical Subcommittee of the United Nations that was accepted by the subcommittee, and in June 2016, the United Nations Committee on the Peaceful Uses of Outer Space included the recommendation in its report. The report of the committee was presented for approval to the United Nations General Assembly's 71st session, which it approved on December 6, 2016.

In its resolution, the United Nations declares "30 June International Asteroid Day to observe each year at the international level the anniversary of the Tunguska impact over Siberia, Russian Federation on 30 June 1908 and to raise public awareness about the asteroid impact hazard."
