= Grigorij Richters =

German director, activist and producer

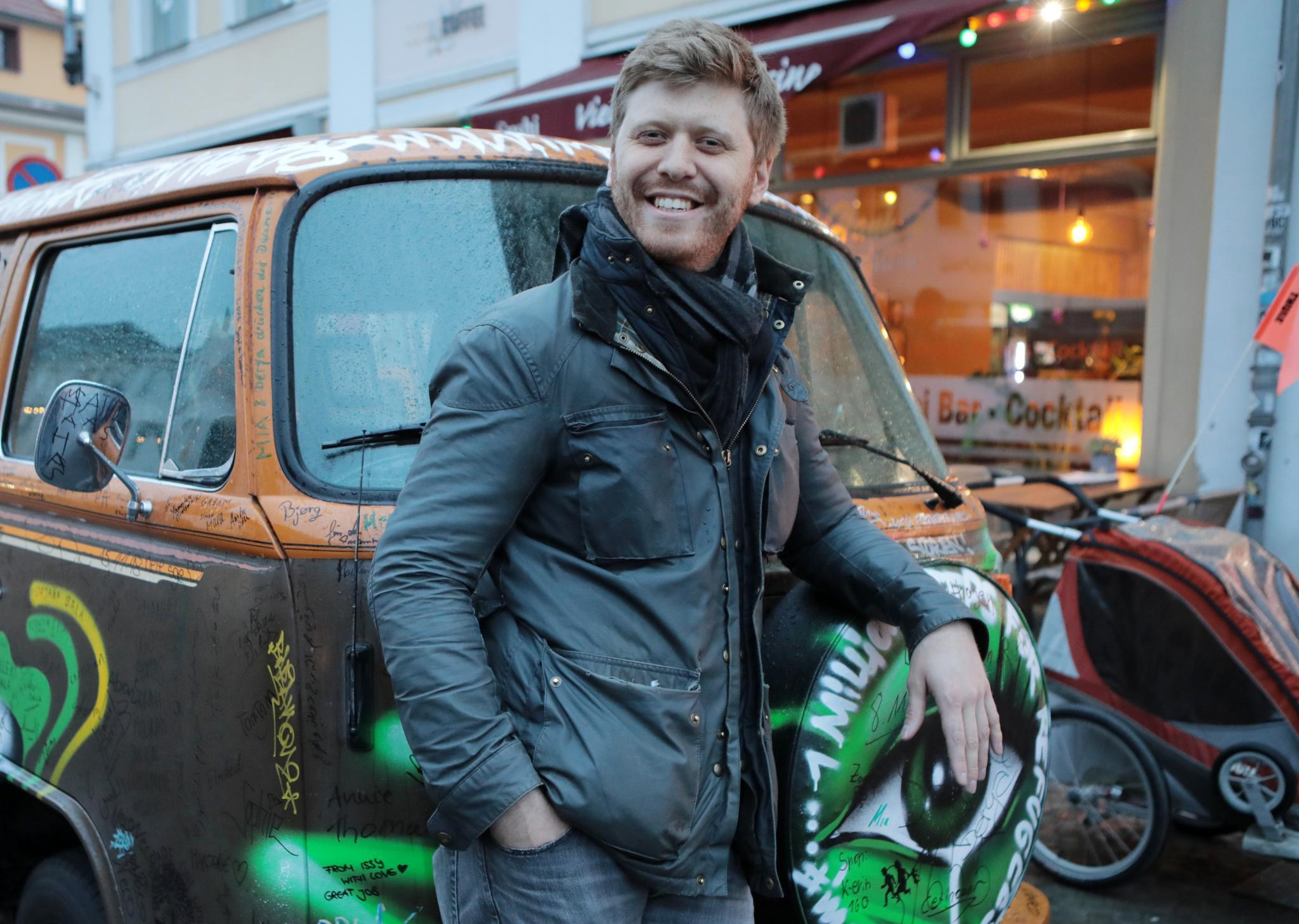
- Grigorij Richters in front of his VW Bus in Potsdam, Germany
- Born: Grigorij S Richters; 21 May 1987 (age 38); Hamburg, West Germany
- Occupations: Film director, activist, producer
- Years active: 1994–present

Grigorij S. Richters (born 21 May 1987) is a film director, public relations expert, activist, producer and official Forbes Council member. He directed the feature film 51 Degrees North and co-founded the global awareness movement Asteroid Day with astrophysicist and Queen guitarist Brian May. Richters was Kevin Spacey's filmmaker-in-residence at the Old Vic Theatre and activist Stephen Sutton's documentarian before Sutton's death in 2014. He filmed and produced his first documentary at the age of 11. He also walked from Paris to Berlin to advocate for refugee children who are stuck in Greek refugee camps. In 2022, he founded XWECAN, a PR and Communications agency. He has worked with the likes of King Charles III, Keira Knightley and Whoopi Goldberg.

== Biography ==
Born and raised in Hamburg, Germany, Richters has been making films since he was old enough to hold a camera. He became a child model at the age of two. His childhood home had access to the river Alster, a right tributary of the Elbe river in Northern Germany. At the age of seven, he set up a stand at the river and started selling hot dogs and drinks to people on boats, making him over one thousand Euros on a good day, enough money to buy expensive camera equipment. In 2003, he moved to the UK and attended the sixth-form college Hurtwood House where he earned the school's "Best Director" award. In 2003 he directed his first commercial for the fitness and wellness chain Meridian SPA

In 2004, he used the money he saved from his days as a child model and directed a short film called "Dean's Life" which ran at several festivals. German actor Mario Adorf was originally attached to play the character "Ashriel" but eventually dropped out due to a conflict in his schedule.

In 2006, he worked as an assistant at the Berlin-based production company Egoli Tossell Film where he helped to secure the music rights for Paul Verhoeven's film Black Book and helped cast Helen Mirren in The Last Station after Meryl Streep dropped out. That same year he directed a short film, IMAGINE, while studying direction under Academy Award-winning Czech film director Miloš Forman at the Film and TV School of the Academy of Performing Arts in Prague. In 2007 he moved to New York City where he worked as a consultant for MTV on shows like the MTV Music awards while he developed the concept for a TV show with VH1. His apartment was overlooking the Hudson River. When Chesley Sullenberger landed the plane on the Hudson River, Richters saw it and filmed it.

In 2010 he moved to London where he started working for Kevin Spacey at the Old Vic Theatre. During this time he also directed his first feature film 51 Degrees North which lead to the creation of the United Nations Asteroid Day. The IAU renamed small body 8664 Grigorijrichters after him for co-founding Asteroid Day. In 2020 he got Married during COVID-19 Pandemic in a small private ceremony.

== Stephen Sutton ==
In 2013, while working for Kevin Spacey at the Old Vic theatre in London he was hired by UEFA to film the Opening Ceremony of the Champions League Final between Bayern Munich and Borussia Dortmund at Wembley Stadium. During the rehearsals he met Stephen Sutton who was one of many drummers during the Opening Ceremony. Richters and Sutton quickly became friends. Richters' production company Films United started managing Sutton's website, helping him run his social media and produced a documentary about his life which still hasn't been finished. After Sutton's death in 2014, Richters gave several interviews on his behalf.

== 51 Degrees North ==
Richters began working on his debut feature film 51 Degrees North in 2010. It took him five years to make the film on a €10,000 budget.

=== Synopsis ===
Damon Miller is a filmmaker grappling with the pressures of an impoverished profession and a dissolving relationship. One routine assignment will change his life as he is involved in the disturbing research into near-Earth objects.

=== Production highlights ===
While filming on Tower Bridge, a bus driver believing one of the actors to be carrying a bomb released the bus UNDER ATTACK signal and a counter-terrorism squad was called. For the climactic moment of the movie, the producers cast 600 Extras and asked them to act as if the world ended on a Saturday Night at Piccadilly Circus. To everyone's surprise 1500 Extras showed up and an additional 1000 passers-by ended up being in some of the shots. This made the production the second largest film shoot at Piccadilly Circus and the low-budget movie with the most Extras in history.

Richters met QUEEN guitarist Dr. Brian May in late 2013. After watching an edit of the film, May agreed to compose the music for the film. They recorded the music in March 2014 at London's Sarm Studios.

=== Release ===
The first private screening of the film took place in September 2014 at the Starmus Festival. The screening was attended by Stephen Hawking, Alexei Leonov, Richard Dawkins and May. The official premier took place on 30 June 2015 at the Science Museum in London. Discovery Channel bought the rights to the film for one year and released the film worldwide in 2015. It became their first ever scripted film.

== Asteroid Day ==
After screening his feature film 51 Degrees North at the Starmus Festival in 2014 he met Stephen Hawking who inspired Richters to create a global awareness day. Just a few months after the festival he teamed up with Brian May, President of B612 Danica Remy and Apollo 9 astronaut Rusty Schweickart to create Asteroid Day. On 6 December 2016, the United Nations General Assembly declared 30 June as International Asteroid Day.

=== #SpaceConnectsUs ===
In response to the Coronavirus crisis in 2020, Richters organised #SpaceConnectsUs with the European Space Agency, Asteroid Day and Markus Payer. "They teamed up to connect Europe and the world with astronauts, scientists and world-famous performers, bringing a message of hope and support for everyone faced with the Coronavirus crisis," it reads on the Asteroid Day website.

== Helping refugees ==
=== One million steps for refugees ===
On 27 October 2018 Richters started walking from Paris to Berlin, making over one million steps, to raise awareness about 1,000 unaccompanied children who live in refugee camps such as Moria Refugee Camp in Greece. His initiative is supported by Queen guitarist Dr. Brian May, influencers Lisa and Lena, astronaut Chris Hadfield, Stephen Fry but also politicians like German state minister Michael Roth. After arriving in Berlin on 9 December, the German government agreed to finding a solution for the children.

=== We Are The Children ===
In March 2019 Richters teamed up with British producer Danielle Turkov Wilson and German filmmaker Uwe Praetel. Together they launched the #WeAreTheChildren campaign. The three met while Richters was walking from Paris to Berlin, in 2018. On 20 March 2019, Italian MEP Brando Benifei and President of the European Parliament Antonio Tajani hosted an event with the group at Parliament in Brussels. The goal of the event was to ask European MEPs and Government leaders to relocate the 1,000 children from Greek refugee camps to other European countries. At the centre of the campaign is a music video for the QUEEN song Is this the world we created...? which was co-written by Brian May and Freddie Mercury in 1984. The campaigners have asked the public to record themselves lip-syncing to the song. The video was premiered in Parliament on 20 March 2019. On 28 March 2019, the video was released online across all QUEEN social media channels and the video platform TikTok.

== Terror in Hanau ==
After a far-right terror attack in Hanau on 19 February 2020, Richters organised a protest in memory of the victims.

== #CookingforWorldPeace and the World Food Programme ==
In 2020, Richters collaborated with Saudi Arabian chef Faisal Aldeleigan and 14 Michelin-starred chefs, along with the World Food Programme, to support its ShareTheMeal initiative. Each chef shared their favorite meal recipes on social media and the ShareTheMeal app.

The renowned chefs involved in the project included David Toutain from France, Atul Kochhar from India, Claude Bosi from France, Franck Giovannini from Switzerland, and Jan Hendrick van der Westhuizen from South Africa.

In October 2020, the World Food Programme was honored with the Nobel Peace Prize.
