= Robert A. Harris =

American film preservationist

Robert A. Harris (born 1945) is an American film historian, archivist, and film preservationist.

== Life ==
Robert A. Harris was born in 1945.

Harris is often working with James C. Katz and has restored such films as Lawrence of Arabia, Vertigo, Rear Window, and My Fair Lady.

He was also a producer of two films: The Grifters (1990) and Space Avenger (1990).

== Restorations ==
- Lawrence of Arabia (1962), restored 1989
- Spartacus (1960), restored 1991
- My Fair Lady (1964), restored 1994
- Vertigo (1958), restored 1996
- Rear Window (1954), restored 2000
- Williamsburg: the Story of a Patriot (1956), restored 2004
- The Godfather (1972), restored 2008
- The Godfather Part II (1974), restored 2008
- It's a Mad, Mad, Mad, Mad World (1963), restored 2013
- Triumph of the Will (1935), restored 2015

== Published works ==
- Harris, Robert & Belton, John (2000). "Getting It Right: Robert Harris on Colour Restoration". Film History. 12 (4, Color Film). Indiana University Press: 393–409. doi:10.2979/FIL.2000.12.3.393 (inactive July 12, 2025). JSTOR 3815347.(registration required)
- Harris, Robert A. & Katz, James C. (December 1999). "Film Restoration on the eve of the Millennium: A View from the Trenches". In 70 mm: The 70 mm Newsletter (59). Archived from the original on February 6, 2020 – via in70mm.com.

== Awards and legacy ==
Harris and James C. Katz received the King Vidor Award for Excellence in Filmmaking at the 2000 San Luis Obispo International Film Festival.

In 2010, Harris was honored by the International Press Academy with its Nikola Tesla Award for Visionary Achievement in Filmmaking Technology.

The Academy Film Archive of the Academy of Motion Picture Arts and Sciences is home to the Robert A. Harris Collection, which consists of film, video tape, and audio material related to Harris' restoration work; it includes over 1,100 items.
