= Hasraf Dulull =

British writer, director and producer

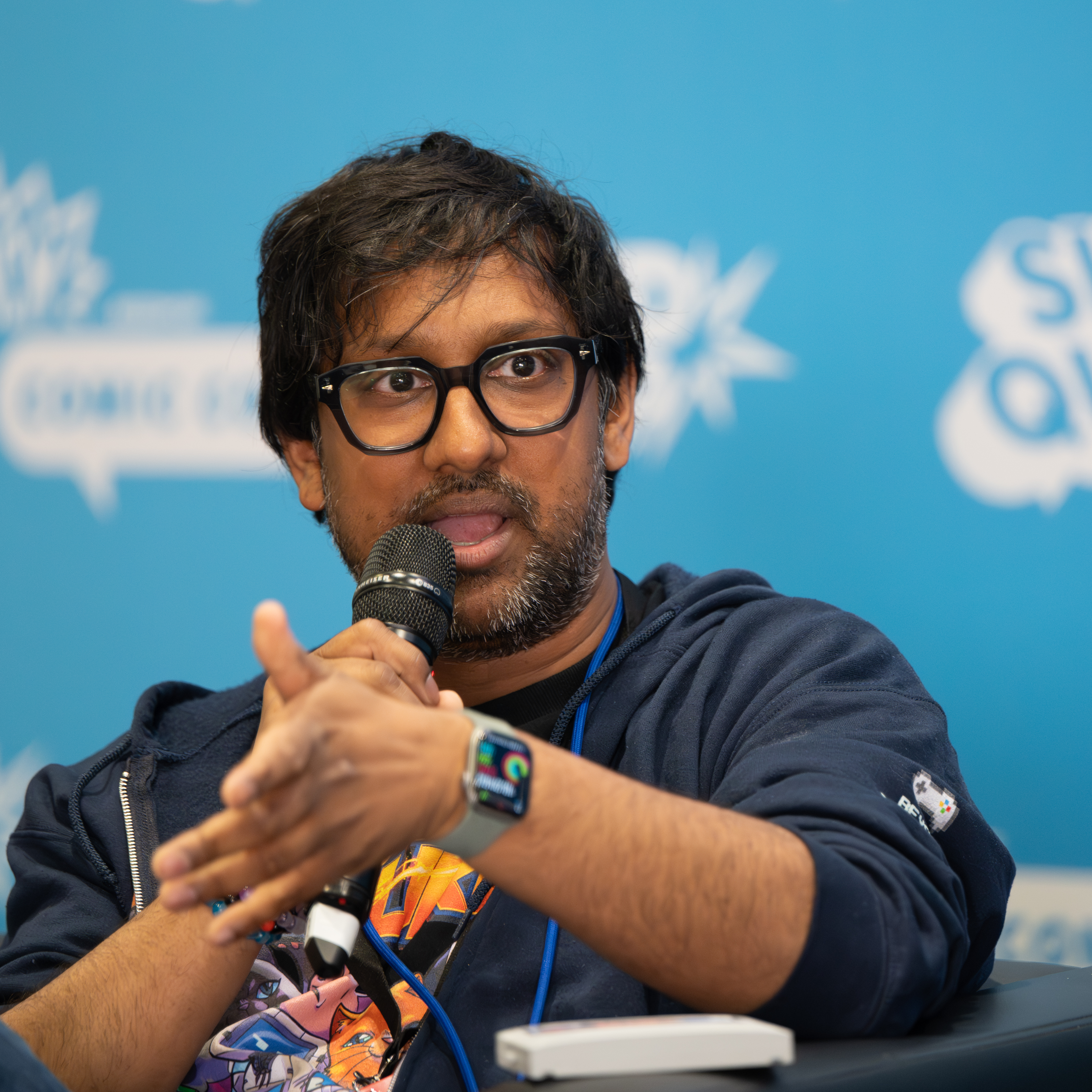
- At MCM Comic Con London 22 May 2026

Hasraf Dulull is a British writer, director and producer.

== Career ==
Dulull began his career as a CGI artist working on video games. In 2003 he started working for the Moving Picture Company, working his way up from compositor to VFX Supervisor on films such as 10,000 BC, Prince of Persia, The Chronicles of Narnia and The Dark Knight. Over the years he worked on numerous high-profile feature films, commercials, music promos and broadcast series such as Poldark and The Aliens on Channel 4. He has been nominated for several Visual Effects Society (VES) Awards for shows such as Planet Dinosaur (BBC) and America: The Story of Us (Discovery).

He began making short science fiction films such as Project Kronos, I.R.I.S and Sync. Project Kronos, made for just £3000 entirely with Adobe Creative Cloud applications. These went viral, leading to a deal to write, direct and co-produce his first feature film The Beyond with Armory Films and Benderspink. Ultimately, Dulull kept the film independent and it was released by Gravitas Ventures in late 2017. In 2018 he directed and co-produced his second film, 2036 Origin Unknown, starring Katee Sackhoff, based on his short story.

Along with Paula Crickard, he is the co-founder of Haz Film.

Dulull has cited his influences as Ridley Scott, James Cameron, Steven Spielberg, John Carpenter, and the Wachowskis.

== Writing and directing credits ==
Year	Title	Type	Notes
2012	Fubar Redux	Short	This was funded with a Kickstarter campaign and was selected for the Cannes 2012 Short Film Corner. It was also screened at various international festivals including FMX 2012.
2013	Project Kronos	Short	This short blended science fiction and documentary styles to create a new subgenre. The film went viral, leading to Dulull developing the idea into a feature film (The Beyond) in 2017. Won 2017 Atlanta Sci-fi Film Festival's Jury Award for Best Sci-fi Feature Film
	Sync	Short	Sci-fi thriller
2014	I.R.I.S	Short	Combines the documentary style of Project Kronos and the thriller style of Sync
2017	The Beyond	Feature film	Pseudo-documentary about first contact with aliens via a wormhole.
2018	2036 Origin Unknown	Feature film	
