= James C. Katz =

American film producer

James C. Katz is an American film historian and preservationist who has restored and reconstructed a number of classic films. Though he began his career as a film producer, he concentrated his attention on preserving existing films, eventually becoming president and founder of the Universal Pictures Classics Division.

His film preservation projects include: Spartacus, My Fair Lady, and Alfred Hitchcock's Vertigo and Rear Window. He frequently collaborates with Bob O'Neil and Robert A. Harris, with whom he shared the King Vidor Award for Excellence in Filmmaking at the 2000 San Luis Obispo International Film Festival.
