= San Luis Obispo International Film Festival =

- Location: San Luis Obispo, California, U.S.
- Founded: 1993
- Language: English
- Website: slofilmfest.org

The San Luis Obispo International Film Festival (SLOIFF) is an American film festival held in San Luis Obispo, California. It is a six-day annual event, showcasing contemporary and classic film screenings at the historic Fremont Theater, the Palm Theatre, and other venues in Atascadero, Paso Robles, and the neighboring seaside towns of Avila Beach and Pismo Beach. The current festival includes three competitions, the George Sidney Independent Film Competition, the Central Coast Filmmakers Showcase, and the Young Filmmakers of Tomorrow Competition.

The San Luis Obispo International Film Festival was founded by Mary A. Harris, a local attorney who was inspired to bring a film festival to San Luis Obispo after attending festivals in Telluride and Los Angeles. The inaugural Festival was launched in 1993 with the support of a special grant from the City of San Luis Obispo, along with the key involvement of Jim Dee and the Palm Theatre. The Festival began with a focus on classic and restored films, with Harris as the Executive Director, and Cathy Peacock as Artistic Director. Veteran film director George Sidney was the first recipient of the King Vidor Award for Lifetime Achievement in the Art of Filmmaking, and Sidney became an enthusiastic booster for the event. In recognition of his contributions to film, as well as his involvement with the Festival, the Festival’s independent film competition was named in his honor. Wendy Eidson became the festival director in 2007 to 2020 and is now led by Executive Director, Skye McLennan.

== Competitions ==
=== George Sidney Independent Film Competition ===
The George Sidney Independent Film Competition was introduced in 1996, in honor of the first recipient of the festival's King Vidor Memorial Award. Accepted films compete in several categories: Best Full-length Narrative Film, Best Full-length Documentary, Best Short Film, Best College Student Film. Audience Awards are also offered for Best Narrative Feature, Best Documentary Feature, Best Short Film, and Best in Fest.

=== Central Coast Filmmakers Showcase ===
The Central Coast Filmmakers Showcase is open to films that were produced, directed, or written by residents of San Luis Obispo, Santa Barbara, or Monterey counties. Awards are given for Best Film Over 30 Minutes and Best Film Under 30 Minutes.

=== Young Filmmakers of Tomorrow Competition ===
The Young Filmmakers of Tomorrow Competition is open to elementary through high school students. There are three age divisions (High School, Middle School, and Primary), with awards in each category for Best Individual Film, Best Group Film, Best SLO County Film, and Best Animated Film. Many entries to this competition come from students who take part in the Youth Filmmaking Workshops held by the festival each summer.

== King Vidor Award ==
The King Vidor Award for Excellence in Filmmaking has been presented annually since the festival began in 1993. The award is named for director King Vidor, who holds the record in the Guinness Book of World Records for the longest career as a film director. He directed sixty-four films over his 67-year career. The award is presented as a tribute to an industry professional who has made a notable artistic contribution to the motion picture industry.

=== Past Recipients ===
The list below shows the winners of the King Vidor Award for every year except 2003 and 2005, in which the festival did not take place.

- 2025 – Bob Mackie
- 2024 – Heather Graham
- 2023 – Rick Carter
- 2022 – Dale Dickey
- 2020 – Lawrence Kasdan
- 2019 – Alfred Molina
- 2018 – Pam Grier
- 2017 – Josh Brolin
- 2016 – Ann-Margret
- 2015 – Peter Bogdanovich
- 2014 – Jeff Bridges
- 2013 – John Hawkes
- 2012 – Sir Richard Taylor
- 2011 – Greg Kinnear
- 2010 – Alan Arkin
- 2009 – Malcolm McDowell
- 2008 – Peter Fonda
- 2007 – Norman Jewison and James Cromwell
- 2006 – Morgan Freeman
- 2004 – Eva Marie Saint
- 2002 – Elmer Bernstein
- 2001 – Howard Keel
- 2000 – Robert A. Harris and James C. Katz
- 1999 – Jim Dee
- 1998 – Stanley Kramer
- 1997 – Ernest Borgnine
- 1996 – Robert Wise
- 1995 – Edward Dmytryk
- 1994 – Delbert Mann
- 1993 – George Sidney

== Hearst Castle Screening ==
In 2012, the festival arranged for a historic screening of Citizen Kane at Hearst Castle. Citizen Kane was loosely based on the life of wealthy publisher William Randolph Hearst, and was considered by Hearst supporters to represent an unfavorable view of the newspaper magnate. Hearst went to great lengths to prevent the film from being shown, and he banned the film from being mentioned in any of his newspapers. Hearst's longtime companion, Marion Davies, claimed that he never saw the movie.

Ben Mankiewicz, grandson of Herman Mankiewicz, who won an Oscar for co-writing the screenplay, introduced the movie at the Hearst Castle Visitor Center as part of the San Luis Obispo International Film Festival. Seventy-one years after the film’s release, it was shown at Hearst Castle for the first time. The event was preceded by a tribute to Timothy White, known for his celebrity portraits. He was awarded the festival’s Spotlight Award.

In 2015 the festival arranged to show Citizen Kane at Hearst Castle again, but this time in the house's own original 50-seat screening room, as a $1,000-per-ticket fundraiser, with Ben Mankiewicz as host.
