= List of LGBTQ-related films of 2016 =

This is a list of lesbian, gay, bisexual, transgender or queer-related films released in 2016. It contains theatrically released films that deal with important gay, lesbian, bisexual, transgender or queer characters or issues and may have same-sex romance or relationships as a plot device.

== Films ==
Title	Director	Country	Genre	Cast	Notes	Ref
1:54	Yan England	Canada	Drama	Antoine Olivier Pilon, Lou-Pascal Tremblay, Sophie Nélisse		
Almost Adults	Sarah Rotella	Canada	Drama	Elise Bauman, Natasha Negovanlis		
The Assignment	Walter Hill	United States	Crime thriller	Michelle Rodriguez, Sigourney Weaver, Tony Shalhoub, Anthony LaPaglia, Terry Chen, Paul McGillion, Caitlin Gerard, Zak Santiago		
As You Are	Miles Joris-Peyrafitte	United States	Drama	Owen Campbell, Charlie Heaton, Amandla Stenberg, John Scurti, Scott Cohen, Mary Stuart Masterson		
Being 17	André Téchiné	France	Drama	Sandrine Kiberlain, Kacey Mottet Klein, Corentin Fila, Alexis Loret		
Below Her Mouth	April Mullen	Canada	Drama	Erika Linder, Natalie Krill, Sebastian Pigott, Mayko Nguyen		
Bromance (Como una novia sin sexo)	Lucas Santa Ana	Argentina	Romantic comedy	Javier De Pietro, Agustín Pardella, Marcos Ribas, Luana Pascua		
Center of My World	Jakob M. Erwa	Germany	Drama	Louis Hofmann, Sabine Timoteo, Jannik Schümann, Svenja Jung, Ada Philine Stappenbeck, Sascha Alexander Geršak, Inka Friedrich, Nina Proll, Thomas Goritzki, Clemens Rehbein	Based on the novel The Center of the World by Andreas Steinhöfel	
Check It	Dana Flor, Toby Oppenheimer	United States	Documentary			
Compulsion	Craig Goodwill	United Kingdom; Canada; Italy	Thriller	Analeigh Tipton, Jakob Cedergren, Marta Gastini	a.k.a. Sadie	
Die Beautiful	Jun Lana	Philippines	Comedy, drama	Paolo Ballesteros, Christian Bables, Joel Torre, Gladys Reyes, Adrian Alandy (credited as Luis Alandy), Albie Casiño		
Don't Call Me Son (Mãe só há uma)	Anna Muylaert	Brazil	Drama	Naomi Nero, Daniel Botelho, Daniela Nefussi, Matheus Nachtergaele, Lais Dias, Luciana Paes, Helena Albergaria		
Emo the Musical	Neil Triffett	Australia	Musical	Benson Jack Anthony, Jordan Hare	Based on Triffett's 2014 short film of the same name	
Esteros	Papu Curotto	Argentina; Brazil	Drama	Ignacio Rogers		
Faggot (Tapette)	Olivier Perrier	Canada	Short drama	Robin L'Houmeau, Eliot Nault		
First Girl I Loved	Kerem Sanga	United States	Drama	Dylan Gelula, Brianna Hildebrand, Pamela Adlon, Mateo Arias, Tim Heidecker, Cameron Esposito, Jennifer Prediger, Erik Griffin		
Forbidden: Undocumented and Queer in Rural America	Tiffany Rhynard	United States	Documentary	Moises Serrano		
The Gemini	Nyo Min Lwin	Malaysia	Drama	Okkar Min Maung, Nyein Chan Kyaw, Aye Myat Thu	First LGBT-related film in the history of Burmese cinema, as well as the first Burmese film shown in Hollywood	
Halte routière	Érik Canuel	Canada	Drama	Nicolas Canuel, Maxim Gaudette	Segment of the larger collective film 9 (9, le film)	
The Handmaiden	Park Chan-wook	South Korea	Drama	Kim Min-hee, Ha Jung-woo, Kim Tae-ri, Cho Jin-woong, Kim Hae-sook, Moon So-ri	Inspired by the novel Fingersmith by Sarah Waters	
Handsome Devil	John Butler	Ireland	Comedy-drama	Fionn O'Shea, Nicholas Galitzine, Andrew Scott, Moe Dunford, Michael McElhatton, Ruairi O'Connor, Ardal O'Hanlon, Mark Lavery, Jay Duffy, Jamie Hallahan		
Heartstone	Guðmundur Arnar Guðmundsson	Israel	Drama	Baldur Einarsson, Blær Hinriksson		
Her Friend Adam	Ben Petrie	Canada	Short drama	Ben Petrie, Grace Glowicki, Andrew Chown		
Home	Frank Lin	United States	Horror, drama	Heather Langenkamp, Samantha Mumba, Kerry Knuppe		
Hurricane Bianca	Matt Kugelman	United States	Comedy	Bianca Del Rio, Willam Belli		
I Am Not Your Negro	Raoul Peck	United States	Documentary	Samuel L. Jackson	Based on the unfinished manuscript Remember This House by James Baldwin	
I Love You Both	Doug Archibald	United States	Comedy-drama	Doug Archibald, Kristin Archibald, Lucas Neff		
Il diario	Paolo Sideri	Italy	Drama	Chiara Pasquini, Giulia Carrara, Cristina Amoroso		
Independence Day: Resurgence	Roland Emmerich	United States	Science fiction	Liam Hemsworth, Jeff Goldblum, Bill Pullman, Maika Monroe, Jessie T. Usher, Travis Tope, William Fichtner, Charlotte Gainsbourg, Judd Hirsch, Brent Spiner, Sela Ward		
The Intervention	Clea DuVall	United States	Drama	Clea DuVall, Alia Shawkat, Cobie Smulders, Natasha Lyonne, Jason Ritter, Ben Schwartz, Melanie Lynskey, Vincent Piazza		
Jesús	Fernando Guzzoni	France; Chile	Drama	Nicolás Durán		
Jonathan	Piotr J. Lewandowski	Germany	Drama	Jannis Niewöhner, André Hennicke, Julia Koschitz, Thomas Sarbacher, Barbara Auer, Maximilian Mauff (credited as Max Mauff), Leon Seidel		
Kiki	Sara Jordenö	Sweden; United States	Documentary	Marie Love and Izana Vidal (trans women), Loretta Coombs, Takima Coombs, Aisha Diori, Twiggy Pucci Garçon, Dorjon 'Dorjie' Hilton, TreySean Marciano, Chi Chi Mizrahi, Omari Olympus Mizrahi, Bryson Rose	Teddy Award winner for Best Documentary	
King Cobra	Justin Kelly	United States	Drama	Garrett Clayton, James Franco, Christian Slater, Keegan Allen, Molly Ringwald, Alicia Silverstone, Spencer Lofranco, Sean Grandillo	Biopic of Brent Corrigan, based on the book Cobra Killer: Gay Porn, Murder, and the Manhunt to Bring the Killers to Justice by Andrew E. Stoner and Peter A. Conley	
Last Men Standing	Erin Brethauer, Tim Hussin	United States	Documentary		Follows lives of long-term AIDS survivors	
Liebmann	Jules Herrmann	Germany	Drama	Godehard Giese, Adeline Moreau, Fabien Ara, Bettina Grahs, Alain Denizart, Denise Lecocq, Morgane Delamotte, Ashley McLellan, Richard Comte, Jean-Philippe Feiss, Jean-Brice Godet		
Little Men	Ira Sachs	United States	Drama	Greg Kinnear, Paulina García, Jennifer Ehle, Theo Taplitz, Michael Barbieri, Talia Balsam, Alfred Molina, Clare Foley		
The Lives of Thérèse	Sébastien Lifshitz	France	Documentary	Thérèse Clerc	Winner of the Queer Palm	
Lovesong	So Yong Kim	United States	Drama	Riley Keough, Jena Malone, Brooklyn Decker, Amy Seimetz, Marshall Chapman, Ryan Eggold, Rosanna Arquette, Cary Joji Fukunaga		
Mapplethorpe: Look at the Pictures	Fenton Bailey, Randy Barbato	United States; Germany	Documentary	Debbie Harry, Fran Lebowitz, Robert Mapplethorpe		
Memories of a Penitent Heart	Cecilia Aldarondo	United States	Documentary	Miguel Dieppa (actor and playwright who died of an AIDS-related illness) and his partner, a Roman Catholic priest called Father Aquin		
Miss Stevens	Julia Hart	United States	Drama	Lily Rabe, Timothée Chalamet, Lili Reinhart		
Moonlight	Barry Jenkins	United States	Drama	Trevante Rhodes, André Holland, Ashton Sanders, Jharrel Jerome Naomie Harris, Janelle Monáe, Mahershala Ali	Screen story by Tarell Alvin McCraney, based on his unpublished semi-autobiographical stage play In Moonlight Black Boys Look Blue; first LGBT-themed film ever to win the Academy Award for Best Picture	
Mother Knows Best (Mamma vet bäst)	Mikael Bundsen	Sweden	Short, drama, family, romance	Alexander Gustavsson, Karl-Erik Franzén		
Neighbors 2: Sorority Rising	Nicholas Stoller	United States	Comedy	Seth Rogen, Zac Efron, Rose Byrne		
The Neon Demon	Nicholas Winding Refn	France; Denmark; United States	Horror	Elle Fanning, Karl Glusman, Jena Malone		
The Ornithologist	João Pedro Rodrigues	Portugal	Drama	Paul Hamy		
Other People	Chris Kelly	United States	Comedy-drama	Jesse Plemons, Molly Shannon, Bradley Whitford, Maude Apatow, John Early, Zach Woods, Madisen Beaty, Josie Totah (credited as J. J. Totah), June Squibb, Paul Dooley, Retta, Matt Walsh, Paula Pell, Colton Dunn, Nicole Byer, Lennon Parham, Rose Abdoo, D'Arcy Carden	Semi-autobiographical look at Kelly's family	
Our Love Story	Lee Hyun-ju	South Korea	Romance, drama	Lee Sang-hee, Ryu Sun-young		
Paris 05:59: Théo & Hugo (Théo et Hugo dans le même bateau)	Olivier Ducastel; Jacques Martineau	France	Drama	François Nambot, Geoffrey Couët	a.k.a. Theo and Hugo in some territories	
The Pass	Ben Williams	United Kingdom	Drama	Russell Tovey, Arinze Kene, Lisa McGrillis, Nico Mirallegro, Rory J. Saper	Screenplay by John Donnelly, based on his stage play	
Political Animals	Jonah Markowitz	United States	Documentary	Carole Migden, Sheila Kuehl, Jackie Goldberg, Christine Kehoe		
Pyotr495	Blake Mawson	Canada; Germany	Short, horror, sci-fi	Alex Ozerov, Max Rositsan, Juliana Semenova, Justin Strazzanti, Grisha Pasternak, Alanna Bale		
Queer Hutterite	Laura O'Grady	Canada	Documentary	Kelly Hofer		
Rara	Pepa San Martin	Chile; Argentina	Drama	Julia Lubbert, Emilia Ossandon, Mariana Loyola, Augustina Muñoz		
Retake	Nick Corporon	United States	Drama	Tuc Watkins, Devon Graye, Sydelle Noel, Derek Phillips		
The Rocky Horror Picture Show: Let's Do the Time Warp Again	Kenny Ortega	United States	Musical, comedy	Laverne Cox, Victoria Justice, Ryan McCartan	Based on The Rocky Horror Show by Richard O'Brien	
Rustlers (Cuateros)	Albertina Carri	Argentina	Documentary		One womans obsession with Isidro Velázquez, the last gaucho raised in Argentina	
Spa Night	Andrew Ahn	United States	Drama	Joe Seo, Haerry Kim, Youn Ho Cho, Tae Song, Ho Young Chung, Linda Han, Eric Jeong, Yong Kim		
Spidarlings	Selene Kapsaski	United Kingdom	Horror, Musical	Sophia Disgrace, Rahel Kapsaski, Jeff Kristian, Lloyd Kaufman, Rusty Goffe, Toshio Maeda, June Brown, Lee Mark Jones		
Strike a Pose	Ester Gould; Reijer Zwaan	Belgium; Netherlands	Documentary	(Dancers); Kevin Stea, Carlton Wilborn, Luis Xtravaganza Camacho, Jose Gutierez Xtravaganza, Salim Gauwloos and Oliver S Crumes III	Documentary profile of several gay dancers who performed on Madonna's 1990 Blonde Ambition Tour	
Suicide Kale	Carly Usdin	United States	Comedy	Brittani Nichols, Lindsay Hicks, Hayley Huntley, Jasika Nicole, Brianna Baker		
Take Me for a Ride	Micaela Rueda	Ecuador	Drama	Samanta Caicedo, Maria Juliana Rangel, Diego Naranjo, Patricia Loor, Monserrath Astudillo, Miranda Zepeda		
These C*cksucking Tears	Dan Taberski	United States	Documentary, short	Patrick Haggerty		
Teenage Cocktail	John Carchietta	United States	Drama	Nichole Bloom, Fabianne Therese, Michelle Borth, Pat Healy, A. J. Bowen, Joshua Leonard		
Teenage Kicks	Craig Boreham	Australia	Drama	Miles Szanto, Daniel Webber, Shari Sebbens, Charlotte Best		
Those Who Make Revolution Halfway Only Dig Their Own Graves (Ceux qui font les révolutions à moitié n’ont fait que se creuser un tombeau)	Mathieu Denis; Simon Lavoie	Canada	Drama	Charlotte Aubin, Laurent Bélanger, Gabrielle Tremblay, Emmanuelle Lussier-Martinez		
Tomcat (Kater)	Händl Klaus	Austria	Drama	Philipp Hochmair, Lukas Turtur	Teddy Award winner as best LGBT-related feature film	
Trouser Bar	Kristen Bjorn	United Kingdom	Short, fantasy	Denholm Spurr, Scott Hunter, Hans Berlin, Ashley Ryder, Zac Renfree, Craig Daniel		
Two Soft Things, Two Hard Things	Mark Kenneth Woods, Michael Yerxa	Canada	Documentary	Alethea Arnaquq-Baril, Jack Anawak		
The Untamed	Amat Escalante	Mexico	Drama	Ruth Ramos, Simone Bucio, Jesús Meza, Eden Villavicencio, Andrea Peláez, Oscar Escalante, Bernarda Trueba		
Uncle Howard	Aaron Brookner	United States; United Kingdom	Documentary	Howard Brookner, Aaron Brookner, Jim Jarmusch, Sara Driver, Tom DiCillo, William S. Burroughs	Exploration of the legacy of filmmaker Howard Brookner	
Weekends	Lee Dong-ha	South Korea	Documentary	About G-Voice, the one and only gay men's choir in South Korea		
Weirdos	Bruce McDonald	Canada	Comedy-drama	Dylan Authors, Julia Sarah Stone, Allan Hawco, Molly Parker		
Where Horses Go to Die	Antony Hickling	France	Drame	Jean-Christophe Bouvet, Manuel Blanc		
Who's Gonna Love Me Now?	Tomer Heymann; Barak Heymann	Israel; United Kingdom	Documentary	Saar Maoz		
Women Who Kill	Ingrid Jungermann	United States	Comedy	Annette O'Toole, Sheila Vand, Tami Sagher, Deborah Rush		
You'll Never Be Alone	Álex Anwandter	Chile	Drama	Sergio Hernández, Antonia Zegers, Gabriela Hernández, Andrew Bargsted		
Zona Norte	Monika Treut	Germany	Documentary	About human rights activist Yvonne Bezerra de Mello and her work with street kids in Rio		
Swiss Army Man	Daniels (directors)	United States	Drama	Paul Dano, Daniel Radcliffe, Mary Elizabeth Winstead		
The Freedom to Marry	Eddie Rosenstein	United States	Documentary	Evan Wolfson, Mary Bonauto, Marc Solomon, Dana Nessel		
