= The Center of the World (novel) =

1998 novel by Andreas Steinhöfel

- Front cover
- Editor: Jonas Sachwitz
- Author: Andreas Steinhöfel
- Translator: Alisa Jaffa
- Language: German
- Publication date: 1998
- Publication place: Germany
- ISBN: 9-780-30748271-6
- OCLC: 742610833

The Center of the World (original German title: Die Mitte der Welt) is a novel by Andreas Steinhöfel from 1998. It is a story about the problems of growing up, puberty, envy and jealousy, friendship and love. The novel was nominated for the German Youth Literature Award. The book has been translated into English by Alisa Jaffa and was edited by Jonas Sachwitz. It was published in the UK under the title Centre of My World.

== Plot ==
The main plot of the novel begins when Phil's best friend Kat (short for Katja) returns from her summer vacation with her family. This plot covers the time between July and shortly after New Year's the following year. It is intercut with many different flashbacks. The story does not primarily treat Phil's homosexuality, but rather stresses the difficulties he has to cope with in everyday life.

With his mother Glass and his twin sister Dianne, seventeen-year-old Phil lives in a huge mansion called Visible which is slightly remote from the nearest city. His slightly crazy mother has constantly changing male relationships. Some of the men in Glass's life, Phil remembers quite well. For example, there was Martin, the gardener, employed by Glass to tame Visible's wild garden. Glass inherited Visible from her sister Stella upon her arrival from the United States.

The city's inhabitants barely have contact with this weird family. The main exception to this is Phil's best friend Kat, the school's principal's daughter, who repeatedly violates her parents' ban on visiting Phil. Another important person is the lawyer Tereza, who is friends with the family and acts as a kind of mentor to Phil.

The story depicts the past of the family through emotional anecdotes, particularly through stories about the missing father, an uncle as a compensating father figure, and childhood memories of Phil and Dianne. Episodes in the present deal with Phil's love for Nicholas, conversations with his mentor and disputes between his sister and his mother. The story is written in the first-person perspective.

== Characters ==
- Phil: 17 years old, gay. Not knowing his real father has left a hole in his life. He serves as the narrator of the novel.
- Dianne: his twin sister. She and Phil used to be inseparable; now Phil misses their closeness, and doesn't understand why Dianne has grown so distant.
- Glass: Dianne and Phil's mother. She hails from the U.S. but has lived in Germany, ever since, while being 9 months pregnant, followed her sister, Stella, whose palace-like home, "Visible," she inherited after Stella died in an accident.
- Tereza: an attorney and Glass' employer. One of Phil's closest confidants.
- Pascal: Tereza's girlfriend.
- Nicholas: the son of rich parents from the wealthy part of town. He is a new student in Phil and Kat's school, the summer of the beginning of the main plot.
- Katja ("Kat"): a childhood friend of Phil's. They met in the hospital when, according to Glass's wishes, Phil underwent otoplasty to correct his protruding ears. Kat's father is the principal of their high school.

== Awards ==
- 1999: Nomination: Deutscher Jugendliteraturpreis.

== Reception ==
In the nationwide German newspaper Die Zeit, Konrad Heidkamp praised Steinhöfel for excelling himself: "The flashbacks from the children's point of view that allow room for Steinhöfel's deadpan humor, and the romantic fairytales - from the pond via the black wooden doll to the castle with royal children -, combined with the young literate author's smart way of introducing these two layers into the storyline, make this a book on the tenderness of reading and the risk inherent to strong feelings."

== Sequel: Defender – Geschichten aus der Mitte der Welt ==
The author continues the stories of some characters in Defender – Geschichten aus der Mitte der Welt ("Defender – Stories from the Middle of the World") in several short stories. This book was also nominated for the Deutscher Jugendliteraturpreis. It has not (yet) been translated into English.

== Movie adaptation ==
A movie adaptation of the book was released on November 10, 2016, with the director being Jakob M. Erwa. The movie was produced by Neue Schönhauser Filmproduktion, mojo:pictures, and Prisma Film; it will be distributed by Universum Film. The project received financial support from the Filmfonds Wien in the amount of €120,000 and from the mandate of the Federal Government for culture and media, minister of state Monika Grütters, in the amount of €220,000 . Louis Hofmann starred as Phil, Jannik Schümann portrayed Nicholas and Svenja Jung played Kat. Additional roles include Sabine Timoteo as Glass, Inka Friedrich and Nina Proll as Tereza and Pascal, Ada Philine Stappenbeck as Dianne, and Sascha Alexander Geršak as Glass's new boyfriend Michael.
