= Jannik Schümann =

German actor (born 1992)

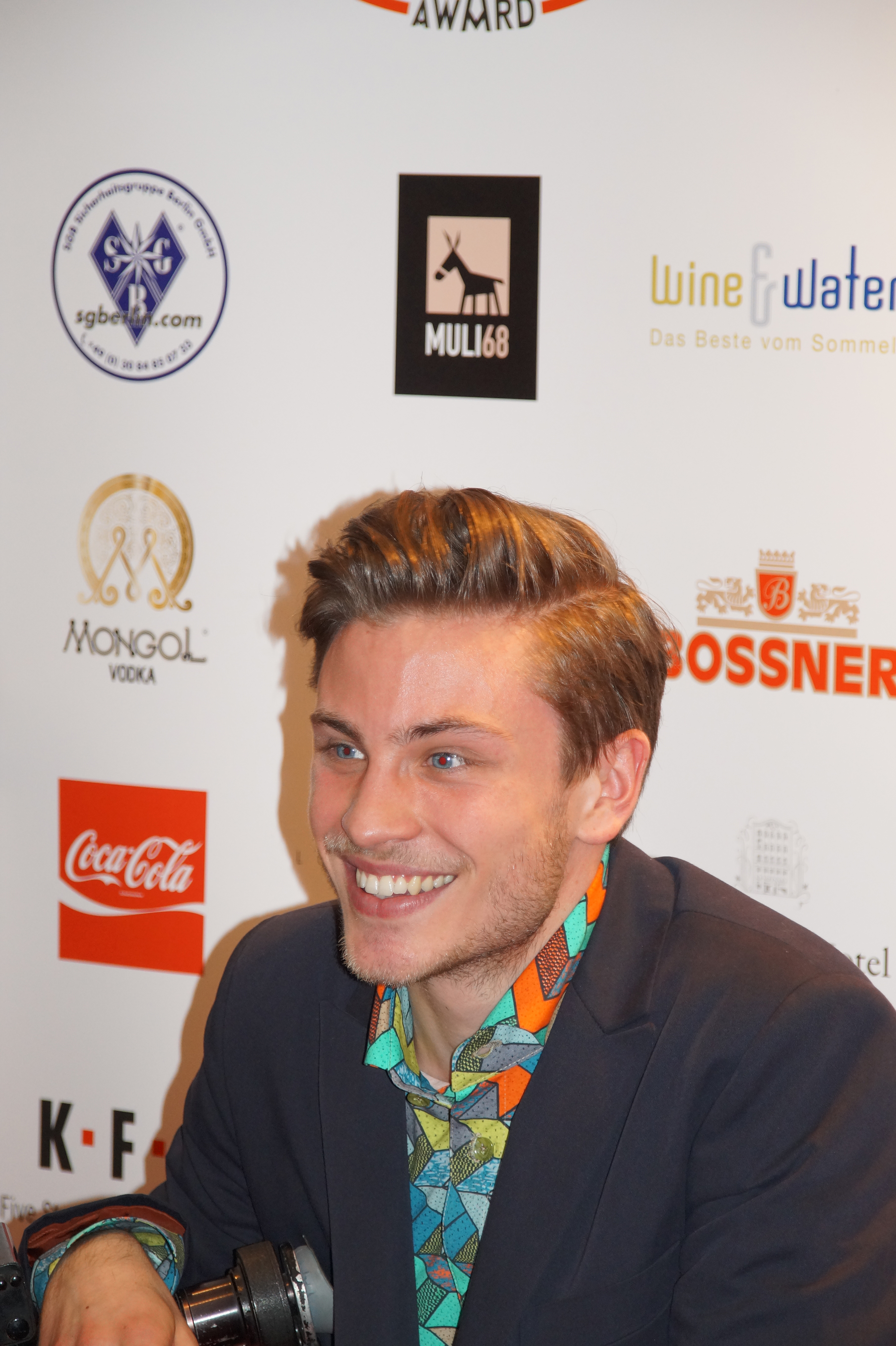
- Schümann in February 2016
- Born: 22 July 1992 (age 34); Hamburg, Germany
- Education: Humboldt University
- Occupation: Actor
- Years active: 2003–present
- Notable work: Close to the Horizon, Charité at War, Sisi, Center of My World, 9 Days Awake
- Partner: Felix Kruck (fiancé) (2019–present)
- Awards: Jupiter Awards 2020, 2021, 2022, Askania Award

Jannik Schümann (German: [ˈjanɪk ˈʃyːman]; born 22 July 1992) is a German actor. He received three Jupiter Awards for Best Actor, for his role of Danny in Close to the Horizon (2020), 9 Days Awake (2021), and the role of Franz Joseph I in Sisi (2022). He is also known for his role in The Aftermath (2019), Center of My World (2016), Die Diplomatin (2016–2023), Monster Hunter (2020), Tribes of Europa (2021), or Charité at War (2019).

== Early life ==
Schümann was born in Hamburg, where he grew up with two older brothers in the rural quarter Kirchwerder in the Bergedorf borough. As a child, Schümann took an interest in dancing and playing the piano, which earned him the role of young Mozart in the German premiere of the Little Mozart musical at the Neuer Flora theater in Hamburg when he was 9 years old. After the performance, a talent agent approached him at a gas station while he was buying a chocolate bar, and handed him her business card. Schümann signed a contract with her and enrolled in acting classes at the New Talent Schauspielschule.

== Career ==
Schümann made his screen debut at the age of 11 when he made an appearance in an episode of the medical drama TV series The Air Rescue Team. At the age of 12, he lent his voice to the main character of the German radio drama adaptation of Oscar and the Lady in Pink, a novel by Éric-Emmanuel Schmitt. When he was 15, he was cast in the two-part film Das Glück am anderen Ende der Welt. Throughout his teenage years, he appeared in TV series, films, theater, radio dramas, and also dubbed characters in cartoon films.

Schümann rose to prominence in 2011 at the age of 17 in a supporting role in Homevideo, a cyberbullying drama, where he portrayed Henry who cyberbullies a classmate, the main character portrayed by Jonas Nay, into committing suicide. The film received critical acclaim, winning numerous awards including the Deutscher Fernsehpreis for Best TV film. Schümann's performance earned him the New Faces Award nomination for Best Young Actor. In the following year, he was cast in a supporting role in Barbara as well as in Mittlere Reife, where he portrayed a young drug dealer, for which he was awarded the Special Jury Prize at the Hessischer Fernsehpreis 2012, along with the ensemble cast.

In 2013, Schümann starred as the manipulative teenager Alev El Quamar in Gaming Instinct, a drama film adaptation of Juli Zeh's novel of the same name. In 2015, he was cast in the leading role of a transgender teenager in Call Me Helen. In 2016, he starred as the love interest of Louis Hofmann in Center of My World, a gay coming-of-age drama dubbed by The Hollywood Reporter as "a beguiling teen romance", while described by The Guardian as "genuinely cute". The film received a 100% rating by film critics on Rotten Tomatoes, as well as numerous international awards and nominations. It is an adaptation of Andreas Steinhöfel’s award-winning young adult novel of the same name.

In 2017, Schümann was cast as the lead in the critically acclaimed dystopian drama Godless Youth, opposite of Jannis Niewöhner. In the same year, he was cast as Albrecht von Schlacht in the comedy High Society. In 2019, he appeared alongside Keira Knightley in the British historical drama The Aftermath, as well as in the second season of drama series Charité, distributed by Netflix. The story is set in the hospital Charité in Berlin during the Second World War. Schümann portrays Otto, the main character's brother, a homosexual student of medicine who opposes the Nazi regime. After serving his military duty, he returns from war to work in the hospital, where he falls in love with Martin. They keep their affair a secret in fear of Martin being sent to a concentration camp over Paragraph 175, a German law that made homosexual acts a crime.

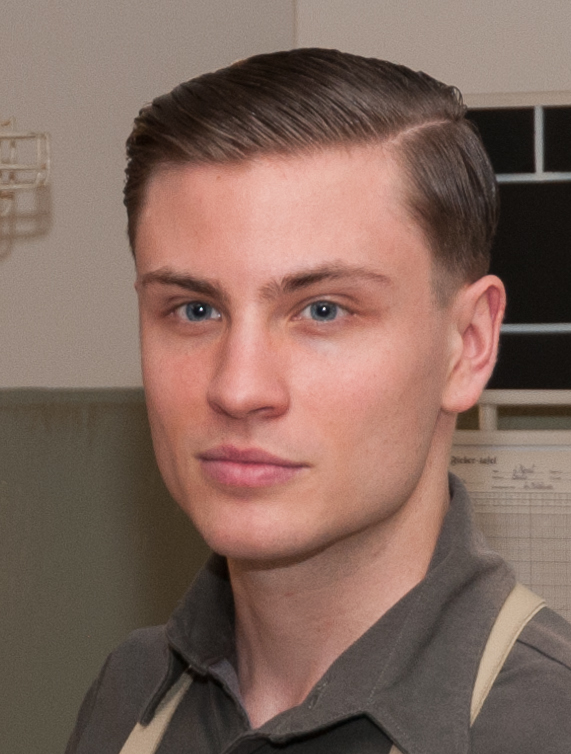
Schümann during filming of Charité in 2018

In 2019, the romantic drama Close to the Horizon was released, with Schümann in the leading role. He portrayed model and kickboxer Danny Taylor, a survivor of severe child sexual abuse who was infected with HIV by his father. The film is an adaptation of Jessica Koch's best-selling book about her real life relationship with Danny Taylor. The film follows Jessica, played by Luna Wedler, trying to navigate a relationship with a severe childhood trauma survivor who is HIV positive in a time when there was no effective antiretroviral medication to prevent the HIV infection from developing into an AIDS diagnosis. Schümann's performance earned him his first Jupiter Award for Best Actor.

In the following year, Schümann appeared in Monster Hunter, starring Mila Jovovich, and landed the leading role in 9 Days Awake, a drama film about Eric, a crystal meth addict, battling drug addiction since he was 14. Schümann's portrayal of a drug addict earned him his second Jupiter Award for Best Actor.

As of 2021, he portrays Franz Joseph I. in the award-winning historical drama series Sisi with Dominique Devenport as Sisi. The role earned Schümann his third Jupiter Award for Best Actor. In February 2023, the series was renewed for the third season.

=== Activism and other ventures ===
On 26 December 2020, Schümann published a photo on Instagram with his partner Felix Kruck, a move interpreted by the international media outlets as his public coming out as gay. In 2021, Schümann criticized the coming out narrative and explained that he had never made a secret of his homosexuality, stating that he only published the photo of his partner "as a signal of support for the LGBTQ community. In February 2021, he was one of 185 actors who signed the #ActOut Manifesto, an initiative by queer German actors to achieve visibility and diversity in film and theater.

On the International Holocaust Remembrance Day on January 27th, 2023, he gave a speech in the German Parliament officially commemorating the LGBTQ victims of the Nazi regime for the first time in the country's history.

== Personal life ==
Schümann has studied English Studies and Media Studies at Humboldt University of Berlin. He wrote his bachelor thesis on queer-coding in Disney films. His father and two brothers are bricklayers. He lives with his fiancé Felix Kruck in Berlin. They announced their engagement on 3 March 2024.

== Filmography ==
Year	Title	Role	Notes
2003	Die Rettungsflieger	Torben	Episode: Rivalen im Cockpit
2007	Tatort	Felix Freiberg	Episode: Liebeshunger
2007	A Life So Far Away	Lukas Holländer	TV movie
2009	Stubbe – Von Fall zu Fall	Sebastian Engelhardt	Episode: Im toten Winkel
2009	Die Pfefferkörner	Max	TV series, 4 episodes
2010	Kommissarin Lucas	Moritz Schreiner	Episode: Wenn alles zerbricht
2010	SOKO Wismar	Timo Bronnert	Episode: Die Prophezeiung
2010	Garmischer Bergspitzen	Heiko Sailer	TV movie
2010	A gURLs wURLd	Nicholas/Nicolas	TV series
2011	Notruf Hafenkante	Jan Wörner	Episode: Eltern – nein, danke!
2011	Homevideo	Henry	TV movie
2011	The Old Fox	Leon Tiefensee	Episode: Schleichendes Gift
2011	Küstenwache	Sören Gutbrodt	Episode: Verlorene Unschuld
2012	Ferngesteuert	Maik	Short
2012	Barbara	Mario	
2012	Mittlere Reife	Tim Seifert	TV movie
2012	Cologne P.D.	Manuel Fink	Episode: Mord nach Schulschluss
2012	Polizeiruf 110	Jan Gottsched	Episode: Eine andere Welt
2013	Der Lehrer	Roman Wittmann	Episode: Ich hab' ja gesagt, ich bin Lehrer
2013	The Inventive Lady	Tommy Freisinger	TV movie
2013	Lotta & die frohe Zukunft	Ben	TV movie
2013	Gaming Instinct	Alev El Quamar	
2013	Heiter bis tödlich: Morden im Norden	Tim Landscheid	Episode: Über Bord
2013	Tatort	Konstantin Auerbach	Episode: Gegen den Kopf
2013	Bella Block	Felix Larson	Episode: Angeklagt
2014	Katie Fforde	Thomas Franklin	Episode: Das Meer in dir
2014	Sechs auf einen Streich	Gustav	Episode: Die drei Federn
2015	Schuld nach Ferdinand von Schirach	Lukas	Episode: Die Illuminaten
2015	Die kalte Wahrheit	Thomas	TV movie
2015	Mein Sohn Helen	Finn Wilke/Helen Wilke	TV movie
2015	Großstadtrevier		Episode: Geborene Verlierer
2016	Die Hebamme II	Anton	TV movie
2016	Alarm für Cobra 11 – Die Autobahnpolizei	Martin Gruber	Episode: Tödlicher Profit
2016	Die Diplomatin	Nikolaus Tanz	2 episodes
2016	Center of My World	Nicholas	
2016	LenaLove	Tim	
2017	Godless Youth	Titus	
2017	High Society	Albrecht von Schlacht	TV movie
2019	Close to the Horizon	Danny Taylor	TV movie
2019	The Aftermath	Albert	
2019	Charité at War	Otto Marquardt	TV series
2019	Your Color	Karl	Original title: Deine Farbe
2020	Monster Hunter	Aiden	
2021	Tribes of Europa	Dewiat	TV series

== Awards ==
- 2012: Nomination for the New Faces Award for Homevideo (Best young actor)
- 2012: Hessischer Fernsehpreis special award of the jury for Mittlere Reife (together with Isabel Bongard, Sonja Gerhardt, Vincent Redetzki, Anton Rubtsov)
- 2016: Askania Award (Shooting-Star-Award)
- 2020: Jupiter Award – Best National Actor
- 2020: GQ Care Award – Best Look
- 2021: Jupiter Award – Best National Actor
- 2022: Jupiter Award – Best National Actor
