= Angélica Negrón =

Puerto Rican composer

Angélica Negrón (born 1981) is a Puerto-Rican composer and multi-instrumentalist recognized for composing music for accordions, robotic instruments, toys, and electronics, as well as for chamber ensembles, orchestras, choirs, and films. Negrón is a founding member of the electronic indie band Balún, where she sings and plays the accordion. She is based in Brooklyn, New York, where she is a teaching artist for New York Philharmonic's Very Young Composers program and Lincoln Center Education.

She grew up in San Juan where she received her early education in piano and violin at the Conservatory of Music of Puerto Rico. Caribbean influences can be heard in her work, most notably in Balún, the indie dream-pop band she founded.

Negrón is an artist in residence at National Sawdust working on a lip sync opera, Chimera, for drag queen performers and chamber ensemble exploring the ideas of fantasy and illusion as well as the intricacies of identity.

== Life ==
Angélica Negrón is a Puerto Rican native, born in San Juan, who lives in Brooklyn, New York. As a child, she studied piano and violin at the Conservatory of Music of Puerto Rico. She earned her master's degree at New York University and is working on her doctoral degree in music composition at the Graduate Center of the City University of New York as of 2016. She educates at New York Philharmonic's Very Young Composers Program, Lincoln Center Education, The Little Orchestra Society, and co-founded the Spanish immersion music program for young children. Negrón was selected for a Van Lier Fellowship Program in 2014–15 and a New York Foundation for the Arts Artist Fellowship in 2016.

Negrón has written pieces for various art forms and entertainment, including Memories of a Penitent Heart and Los Condenados. She has been featured in concerts and music festivals including the “Ecstatic Music Festival 2012," MATA Festival 2011, and Bang on a Can Summer Festival 2011. Her collection of instruments began with a Strawberry Shortcake music box, and has expanded with the addition of bells, trumpet, voice box, and whistles. She performs with Balún, an electro-acoustic pop band, and her chamber ensemble, Arturo en el barco. Negrón's music is published by Good Child Music.

== Education ==
Negrón received an early education in piano and violin at the Conservatory of Music of Puerto Rico, where she later studied composition with Alfonso Fuentes. She holds a master's degree in music composition from New York University, where she studied with Pedro da Silva. She pursued doctoral studies at the CUNY Graduate Center, where she studied composition with Tania León. Her dissertation focused on the work of Meredith Monk. Also active as an educator, Negrón is a teaching artist for New York Philharmonic's Very Young Composers program and Lincoln Center Education and co-founded the Spanish immersion music program for young children Acopladitos with Noraliz Ruiz.

== Career ==
Negrón has been commissioned by the Albany Symphony, Bang on a Can All-Stars, A Far Cry, MATA Festival, loadbang, The Playground Ensemble, the American Composers Orchestra, Kronos Quartet, Prototype Festival, Brooklyn Youth Chorus, Sō Percussion, the Dallas Symphony Orchestra, National Symphony Orchestra, Opera Philadelphia, the Louisville Orchestra and the New York Botanical Garden.

She has collaborated with many artists such as Lido Pimienta, Mathew Placek, Sasha Velour, Cecilia Aldarondo, Mariela Pabón, Adrienne Westwood, Sō Percussion, The Knights, Face the Music and NOVUS NY.

Her music has been performed at the Kennedy Center, the Ecstatic Music Festival, EMPAC, Bang on a Can Marathon and the 2016 New York Philharmonic Biennial. Her film scores have been heard numerous times at the Tribeca Film Festival. Her music has been performed by TRANSIT Ensemble, Choral Chameleon, janus trio, Cadillac Moon Ensemble, Cantori NY, Face the Music, Iktus Percussion Quartet, ETHEL, NYU Symphony Orchestra, Montpelier Chamber Orchestra, Springfield-Drury Civic Orchestra and the Puerto Rico Symphony Orchestra, among others. She has written music for documentaries, films, theater and modern dance. She frequently collaborates with the experimental theater company Y No Había Luz from Puerto Rico, writing music for their plays, which often incorporate puppets, masks and unusual objects.

Upcoming premieres include works for the Seattle Symphony, Los Angeles Philharmonic, New York Philharmonic Project 19 initiative and multiple performances at Big Ears Festival 2022. Negrón continues to perform and compose for film.

Balún (2003–Present)

Members: Andrés Fontánez, Angélica Negrón, José A. Olivares, Noraliz Ruíz

Founded by Negrón and her husband, José A. Oliveres, Balún is an experimental electronic band originally from the San Juan indie scene. The band has been described as dreampop with reggaeton influences. It incorporates drum machines, bomba barrel drums, jíbaro guitarillos, and cuatro, infusing its sound with its Caribbean background. It refers to its sound as “dreambow,” a mix of the terms dreampop and dembow, the musical term to describe a rhythm originating from Jamaica. Its 2016 single "La Nueva Ciudad” broke into Spotify's Viral Top 50 globally and in eight Latin American countries.

- Albums:

Something Comes Our Way - 2006

An EP Collection - 2006

Memoria Textil - 2010

Prisma Tropical - 2018

- Singles and EPs:

EP1 - 2003

Nada Que Hacer Hoy - 2003

While Sleeping - 2004

Snol EP - 2006

Camila - 2011

El Medio Contenido - 2011

La Luna - 2012

== Awards and recognition ==
Recipient of the 2022 Hermitage Greenfield Prize.

Selected by Q2 and NPR listeners as part of “The Mix: 100 Composers Under 40”

Selected by Flavorpill as one of the “10 Young Female Composers You Should Know”

Selected as one of the recipients for NYFA's 2016 Artists’ Fellowship Program.

Won the 2020 Imagen Award for "Best Music Composition for Film or TV" for Independent Lens.

== Compositions ==
=== Orchestra ===
- Campos Flotantes (2024)
- Arquitecta (2023) vocalist & orchestra
- Sinfonía Isleña (2023)
- For Those (2022)
- You Are the Prelude (2022)
- Moriviví (2022)
- Color Shape Transmission (2022)
- Tornasol (2021)
- Fractal Isles (2021)
- En otra noche, en otro mundo (2020)
- Un dos, tres (2019)
- Sonidos del Avistamiento (2019)
- Mapping (2017)
- Me he Perdido (2015)
- What Keeps Me Awake (2008)
- Parallel Synchronized Randomness (2007)
- Pequeño sueño en rojo (2005)

=== Large Ensemble ===
- Begin at the Beginning (2018) middle school string ensemble
- The Blue Hour, a collaborative song cycle by Shara Nova, Caroline Shaw, Rachel Grimes, Sarah Kirkland and Angélica Negrón (2016) string orchestra and mezzo-soprano
- El gran caleidoscopio (2012) large ensemble
- Diario Vietnam, suite from the film score (2004) string orchestra

=== Chamber Ensemble ===
- Conversación a distancia (2020) clarinet, vibraphone, piano, violin, cello and electronics
- Marejada (2020) string quartet and fixed electronics
- Say Something in Spanish (2020) soprano, clarinet, tenor sax, violin, cello, 2 percussionists
- These Strings (2019) baritone voice, 2 violins, viola, cello and bass
- Fruity Roll On Sparkly Lip Gloss (2019) flute, bass clarinet, tenor sax, cello, drum set, piano (4 hands) MPK mini (live electronics)
- Why Does the Moon Keep Following Us? (2019) flute, clarinet, piano and fixed electronics
- Gone (2019) percussion quartet and robotic percussion
- Turistas (2018) bass clarinet, SPD drum pad, electric guitar, MIDI keyboard, cello and double bass
- Still Here (2017) harp, tenor saxophone, electronics
- This Person (2016) female voice, flute, clarinet, French horn, percussion (live electronics), 2 violins, viola, cello and double bass
- Dóabin (2015) baritone voice, trumpet, trombone, bass clarinet and fixed electronics
- Dust (2015) flute, clarinet, violin, cello and fixed electronics
- Cosmorama (2015) violin, French horn, piano (4 hands) and fixed electronics
- Stereogram (2014) 2 oboes, 2 bassoons, pre-recorded electronics
- There and Not Here (2014) string quartet and percussion quartet
- La isla mágica (2013) bass and fixed electronics
- Was I the Same When I Woke Up This Morning? (2011) Orff xylophone and Celtic harp
- Bubblegum grass/peppermint field (2011) string quartet and fixed electronics
- Four Ways to Eat Cereal (2010) 2 percussionists, bass, clarinet
- Quimbombó (2010) flute, violin, cello and percussion
- Tembleque (2010) flute, violin, cello, percussion
- I Can Still Hear You (2009) accordion and fixed electronics
- Drawings for Meyoko (2009) lute, viola/banjo, hard and electronics
- Count to Five (2009) percussion quartet
- What I'm Trying To Say Is... (2009) violin, cello, bass clarinet, percussion and piano
- They Swim Under My Bed (2008) 3 violins (or 2 violins and viola) and piano
- The Flying Trapeze (2008) woodwind quintet
- PSR (2007) accordion and prepared piano
- Tres insultos para dos violines (2004) 2 violins
- Triste silencio programático (2002) string quartet

=== Solo ===
- Cooper and Emma (2020) violin
- Parallax (2018) piano and MPK mini (live electronics)
- Las Desaparecidas (2016) cello and fixed electronics
- The Place We Are (2014) keyboard and live electronics
- Hush (2013) flute and fixed electronics
- Panorama (2012) cello and fixed electronics
- The Little Things (2011) toy instruments and live electronics
- The Peculiar Purple Pie-man of Porcupine Peak (2011) piano and fixed electronics
- Alguien sube por el camino inventado (2008) cello
- Technicolor (2008) harp and fixed electronics
- Columpio (2008) toy piano and live electronics
- La intervención (2008) piano
- Mercedes (2007) guitar
- La bicicleta de cristal (2003) vibraphone
- Sueño recurrente No. 1 veo carros fantasmas (2002) piano

=== Vocal ===
- Calladita (2020) SSAA chorus
- Cosecha (2020) SSAA chorus
- Chorus of the Forest (2019) SATB chorus, robotic percussion, and fixed electronics
- I Shouldn't be up here (2019) SSAA chorus, electric guitar and percussion
- Letras para cantar (2019) three female voices and electronics
- Paradise (2019) SATB chorus and fixed electronics
- Nada Mejor que una persona (2018) SSAA chorus
- FONO (2011) SATB chorus and fixed electronics
- There Once Was (2011) SATB chorus, accordion and fixed electronics
- Mi Lumia (2009) 3 female voices
- Parsimonia (2005) 6 female voices
- Malabarismos (2005) flute and female voice
- Pensamiento no. 1 (2003) piano and female voice
- Catorce menos (2013) harp and children's voice

=== Ballet ===
- “Casa tomada” for chamber orchestra (2006)

=== Filmography ===
- Landfall, Cecilia Aldarondo (2020)
- The First Rainbow Coalition, Ray Santisteban (2019)
- Todos ibamos a ser reyes, Marel Malaret (2019)
- The Feeling of Being Watched, Assia Boundaoui (2018)
- Councilwoman, Margo Guernsey (2018)
- Sol de Medianoche, Douglas Sánchez (2017)
- Love the Sinner, Jessica Devaney (2017)
- Memories of a Penitent Heart, Cecilia Aldarondo (2016)
- Los condenados, Robertp Busó Garcia (2012)
- Sisterhood of the Night, Jeffrey Moss (2006)
- How the Dodo Became Extinct, Shelley Dodson (2005)
- Diario Vietnam, Alfredo Rivas (2004)

=== Opera ===
- The Island We Made (2021)
