= Pinamar (disambiguation) =

The name Pinamar may refer to:

- Pinamar, an Argentine coastal seaside resort on the Atlantic Ocean
- Pinamar Partido, an administrative division of Buenos Aires Province, Argentina
- Pinamar, a Uruguayan resort town of the Costa de Oro in the Canelones Department
- Pinamar, a 2017 Argentine film directed by Federico Godfrid
