= Bromance (disambiguation) =

A bromance is a close but non-sexual relationship between two or more men.

Bromance may also refer to:

- "Bromance" (Avicii song), a 2010 single by Swedish DJ and producer Avicii, working under the stage name Tim Berg
- Bromance (American TV series), a 2008 American reality series that aired on MTV
- Bromance (2016 film), an Argentine film
- Bromance (2025 film), an Indian Malayalam-language adventure comedy film
- Bromance (Taiwanese TV series), a 2015 Taiwan drama series
- Bromantic comedy, a film genre
