= Center of My World (film) =

2016 coming-of-age romantic drama film

- German theatrical release poster
- German: Die Mitte der Welt
- Directed by: Jakob M. Erwa
- Screenplay by: Jakob M. Erwa
- Based on: The Center of the World by Andreas Steinhöfel
- Produced by: Boris Schönfelder
- Starring: Louis Hofmann; Sabine Timoteo; Jannik Schümann; Ada Philine Stappenbeck; Inka Friedrich; Nina Proll; Svenja Jung; Sascha Alexander Geršak
- Cinematography: Ngo The Chau
- Edited by: Carlotta Kittel
- Music by: Paul Gallister
- Production companies: Neue Schönhauser Filmproduktion; Prisma Film; Universum Film; mojo:pictures
- Distributed by: Universum Film / DCM Film Distribution (Germany); Constantin Film (Austria)
- Release dates: 26 June 2016 (Filmfest München); 10 November 2016 (Germany); 11 November 2016 (Austria)
- Running time: 115 minutes
- Countries: Germany; Austria
- Language: German

Center of My World (German: Die Mitte der Welt) is a 2016 coming-of-age romantic drama film directed by Jakob M. Erwa, based on the 1998 best-selling novel The Center of the World by Andreas Steinhöfel.

== Plot ==
Seventeen-year-old Phil returns home from summer camp to the secluded Villa Visible, an old mansion where he lives with his mother, Glass, and his twin sister, Dianne. The family, viewed as eccentric by their remote community, maintains little contact with neighbors, though they share a warm bond with their lesbian friends, Tereza and Pascal. Dianne is rumored to communicate with animals. Upon his return, Phil discovers that a hurricane has ravaged the area, including their garden, and senses tension between Glass and Dianne, who now barely speak to each other or him. He spends his remaining summer days with his eccentric best friend, Kat.

When school resumes, Phil is drawn to Nicholas, a new classmate, and the two begin a passionate affair. Their relationship faces no objections; Tereza even lends them her weekend cabin for privacy. Though Nicholas grows close to Kat, creating a carefree dynamic among the trio, Phil questions Nicholas's sincerity. To prove his devotion, Nicholas shows Phil a shed where he collects discarded objects. Reigniting his feelings, Phil crafts a display case for Nicholas in the workshop of Michael, Glass's new boyfriend. However, Phil later discovers Nicholas and Kat sleeping together. Nicholas insists he needs both Phil and Kat, but Phil rejects him.

Phil notices Dianne sneaking out nightly and follows her to a hospital. Confronting Glass about their rift, he learns nothing of what transpired during his absence. As familial tensions escalate, Phil moves in with Tereza, followed shortly by Dianne.

Flashbacks reveal the family's troubled past: Glass arrived in Germany pregnant from America, never disclosing the twins’ father's identity. Her string of failed relationships, often sabotaged by her behavior, left Dianne longing for a paternal figure. A miscarriage—nearly fatal for Glass—further strained their history. Glass hints that a botanical book in the villa's library holds answers to their conflict. Phil recalls tales of medieval women using belladonna poison to enhance allure, then lethal doses to “erase their mistakes.” Finding the book in Dianne's room, he learns she poisoned Glass in revenge for driving away her partners. During Phil's absence, Dianne's boyfriend was left comatose after a storm-induced accident, destabilizing her. Her confession to Glass caused the family's estrangement. With Michael's help, Phil reconciles Dianne and Glass, reuniting the family.

After ending things with Nicholas, Phil realizes his family is his “center of the world”—a concept Glass once explained varies for everyone. He decides to travel to the U.S. to seek his father, whom Glass describes as a good man she abandoned. Before departing, she whispers his father's name to him.

== Cast ==
- Louis Hofmann as Phil
- Sabine Timoteo as Glass
- Jannik Schümann as Nicholas
- Ada Philine Stappenbeck as Dianne
- Svenja Jung as Kat
- Sascha Alexander Geršak as Michael
- Inka Friedrich as Tereza
- Nina Proll as Pascal
- Thomas Goritzki as Herr Hänel, teacher
- Clemens Rehbein as Kyle

== Production ==
The novel The Center of the World, which was released in 1998, became a popular young adult book. Among other awards, it won the Deutscher Jugendliteraturpreis in 1999 and with the Buxtehude Bull in the same year. In 2000, the novel received the Literaturpreis der Jury der jungen Leser in Vienna. Furthermore, it entered the bestseller list of the German magazine Der Spiegel as the first German children's book ever.

An international co-production between Germany and Austria, the film was produced by Neue Schönhauser Filmproduktion, mojo:pictures, and Prisma Film and distributed by Universum Film. The production received various public fundings, including money from the Filmfonds Wien and from the representative of the Federal Government for culture and media.

The film was directed by Jakob M. Erwa, who also wrote the screenplay.

Louis Hofmann starred as Phil; he was awarded with the Deutscher Schauspielerpreis 2016 as best young actor a few weeks before the premiere. Jannik Schümann played Nicholas and Svenja Jung portrayed Kat. Additional roles include Sabine Timoteo as Glass, Inka Friedrich and Nina Proll as Tereza and Pascal, Ada Philine Stappenbeck as Dianne, and Sascha Alexander Geršak as Glass's new boyfriend Michael.

The film had its world premiere at the Munich International Film festival on 26 June 2016, and was also screened at the Moscow International Film Festival. It was released theatrically in Germany on 10 November 2016 and in Austria the following day.

== Reception ==
Boyd van Hoeij from The Hollywood Reporter welcomed that only two people are at the center of the story: "Luckily, the blossoming relationship between Phil and Nick are at the center of the movie where a hot flirt turns into a physical relationship." According to van Hoeij, it is a big forte of the film that Erwa shows how teenagers have to struggle with their sexuality, and the director proves that he has understood that, in physical love, less is sometimes more. Van Hoeij praises the actors Hofmann and Schümann, who portrayed those two boys in an affectionate and tender way, which is as interesting as the fact that those teenagers have to question themselves, due to their sexuality, if they are ever going to be happy. However, van Hoeij also noted that because of the focus on those two characters, others like Kat and Diane felt like they were neither protagonists nor side characters.

=== Reaction in Russia ===
On the verge of the press conference in the course of the premiere in Moscow, the film was rejected by some journalists and critics as propaganda as non-traditional portrayal of sexual relationships between teenagers that are not allowed to be distributed in Russia. Kirill Raslogow, the program director of the film festival, had warned his fellow countrymen beforehand: "This movie could shock the audience." The Austria Presse Agentur (APA) described the problem of the film in Russia: "With this portrayal of society, the director reproduces a downright nightmare of right-conservative Russians who often disqualify Europe as 'Gayrope'." Russian film critic Andrej Plachow, who is in charge of the selection panel of the Moscow film festival, explained: "I fear that there will be barely any companies in Russia that want to distribute this movie. They understand that they would get into trouble." However, the film received a surprisingly positive response by the audience in Moscow.

== Accolades ==
Moscow International Film Festival 2016

- Nominated in the major competition for the Golden George

Munich International Film festival 2016 (selection)

- Nominated in the category Best Screenplay
- Nominated in the category Best Director
