= Sanctuary (2015 film) =

2015 film

- Film poster
- Directed by: Marc Brummund
- Written by: Nicole Armbruster; Marc Brummund
- Produced by: Rüdiger Heinze; Stefan Sporbert
- Starring: Louis Hofmann; Katharina Lorenz; Uwe Bohm
- Cinematography: Judith Kaufmann
- Edited by: Hans Funck
- Music by: Anne Nikitin
- Distributed by: Zum Goldenen Lamm Filmproduktion
- Release date: 25 June 2015
- Running time: 104 minutes
- Country: Germany
- Language: German

Sanctuary (German: Freistatt) is a 2015 German drama film directed by Marc Brummund. It was one of eight films shortlisted by Germany to be their submission for the Academy Award for Best Foreign Language Film at the 88th Academy Awards, but it lost out to Labyrinth of Lies.

== Plot ==
In the summer of 1968, fourteen-year-old Wolfgang (a boy from Osnabrück who enjoys tinkering with mopeds) finds himself in constant conflict with his stepfather.

After Wolfgang is caught showing his stepfather's pornography magazine to his friends, his stepfather arranges through the local Youth Office to have him sent to Freistatt, a Christian educational facility. His mother comforts him before his departure, promising to bring him home for Christmas. Wolfgang takes a photograph of her with him as a keepsake.

Upon arrival, Wolfgang is warmly greeted in the garden by Brockmann, the housefather. However, Brockmann quickly drops the facade, interrupting his gardening to read aloud from Wolfgang's juvenile record. The Youth Office has classified Wolfgang as "aggressive," "recalcitrant," and "disobedient," noting he had previously fled the Heidequell school after just three months. Wolfgang defends himself, insisting he only acted in self-defense and was never the instigator of violence.

Unmoved, Brockmann dismissively folds a page from Wolfgang's file into a planter. Life at Freistatt is akin to a military barracks. The supervisors demand to be addressed as "Brother," keeping with the guise of being "good Christians." Brockmann, who rules the institution with a brutal hand, boasts that he has run the facility for twenty-five years, dating back to 1943.

When Wolfgang intervenes to protect a weaker boy named Mattis from Bernd - the peer enforcer of the group - Bernd violently punishes him. Soon after, Wolfgang befriends Anton, an Afro-German boy who claims to also be from Osnabrück.

The boys are subjected to grueling forced labor in a peat bog. When Wolfgang complains that he will not receive work boots for another two months, he is beaten with a spade by Brother Wilde, an overseer.

Wolfgang's first attempt to escape fails in the treacherous, disorienting terrain of the moor. The facility operates on a system of collective punishment: if one boy misbehaves, the entire group is penalized through food rationing or smoking bans.

Brockmann allows the boys to violently discipline the "guilty" party themselves, only to perversely offer the victim comfort afterward. Wolfgang's refusal to conform leads to ongoing conflicts with Bernd, who demands he follow the rules to spare the group from punishment.

Desperate, Wolfgang gives a letter to Brockmann's daughter, Angelika, asking her to take it to his mother to beg her to rescue him. Although Angelika falsely claims to her father that Wolfgang made inappropriate advances toward her, she takes the letter.

Brockmann eventually discovers the note and punishes the entire group by withholding food. Driven by hunger, Wolfgang attempts to steal tomatoes from Brockmann's garden. He is caught by Brockmannwned in a rainwater barrel.

Defiant, Wolfgang continues to harvest and eat the tomatoes right in front of Brother Wilde; he is beaten with a baton, but his unbroken spirit deeply impresses the other boys.

For his birthday, Wolfgang's mother sends him a traditional chocolate biscuit cake. Brockmann intercepts the package and spitefully eats the cake while Wolfgang watches. Seeking to completely crush Wolfgang's hopes of ever returning home, Bernd burns the photograph of Wolfgang's mother.

Tensions boil over during recreation time when Brother Wilde attempts to confiscate the boys' portable radio. This sparks an uprising: Anton sings the spiritual "Sometimes I Feel Like a Motherless Child" (inspired by Richie Havens' rendition playing on the radio), and the group begins chanting for "freedom."

On Christmas Eve, a scandal rocks the facility: Brother Krapp, an overseer who feigned sympathy for the boys, flees the home after it is revealed he had been sexually abusing Mattis.

During the holiday church service, Angelika secretly slips Wolfgang the key to the house in the collection bag. He uses it to open the door but is intercepted by Brockmann. Wolfgang is taken to the basement, hung from the ceiling by chains, and brutally tortured.

Barely conscious, he experiences feverish hallucinations; a vision of him and his mother in an exhilarating mood on the beach heavily implies an incestuous undertone to their relationship.

Later, during a confrontation in the bog, Wolfgang strikes Brother Wilde in the eye with a spade. Seizing the opportunity, he and Anton escape, navigating out of the moor and hiding in a horse transport headed for Osnabrück. Once there, Anton admits he lied about his origins and has no parents; Wolfgang abandons him. Wolfgang arrives home to find that his mother and stepfather have had a new baby. Soon, Brockmann arrives to drag him back, revealing that Anton has already been recaptured.

Wolfgang's mother insists on accompanying them to see the facility. Upon arriving at Freistatt, Wolfgang tries to exit the car, but his stepfather immediately locks the car doors.

Despite Wolfgang showing his fresh wounds and pleading with his mother not to leave him, his parents drive away.

Back at the camp, Brother Wilde exacts his revenge. With Bernd's help, he attempts to bury Wolfgang alive in the bog.

Brockmann unexpectedly arrives and pulls the unconscious Wolfgang from the makeshift grave. Later, Angelika comes to say goodbye to Wolfgang before leaving to study in Hamburg.

Their interaction begins with tenderness but escalates horribly when Wolfgang, now severely traumatized and mentally shattered, attempts to rape her.

The tragedy culminates when Anton hangs himself. The other boys, furious that Brother Wilde intends to carry on as if nothing happened, attack him and flee the facility in their nightshirts.

Wolfgang, however, stays behind with Anton's body. His spirit is finally broken; he fully institutionalizes himself, eventually volunteering to call for morning roll calls.

Wolfgang is eventually released after his stepfather suffers a fatal accident. He returns home but, upon seeing his half-sibling on the terrace, turns around and walks away without speaking to his mother. He takes a piece of cake from the reception table and leaves.

He tracks down a former friend to borrow money, violently slapping him when the friend tries to touch his cake. In the final scene, Wolfgang is on a train bound for an unknown destination.

As the train passes Freistatt, he watches from above as the current inmates work on their handcar in the bog.

== Cast ==
- Louis Hofmann as Wolfgang
- Alexander Held as Hausvater Brockmann
- Stephan Grossmann as Bruder Wilde
- Katharina Lorenz as Ingrid
- Max Riemelt as Bruder Krapp
- Uwe Bohm as Heinz
- Langston Uibel as Anton
