= Tschuschen:power =

- Created by: Jakob M. Erwa
- Country of origin: Austria

Tschuschen:power is an Austrian television series.

== See also ==
- List of Austrian television series
