= Summer in Berlin (film) =

- German poster for Summer in Berlin
- Directed by: Andreas Dresen
- Written by: Wolfgang Kohlhaase
- Produced by: Stefan Arndt
- Starring: Inka Friedrich; Nadja Uhl; Andreas Schmidt; Vincent Redetzki
- Music by: Pascal Comelade
- Distributed by: X Verleih AG (through Warner Bros.)
- Release dates: 9 September 2005 (Toronto International Film Festival); 5 January 2006 (Germany)
- Running time: 110 minutes
- Country: Germany
- Language: German

Summer in Berlin (German: Sommer vorm Balkon) is a 2005 German tragicomic film directed by Andreas Dresen.

== Reception ==
The film won the Bayerischer Filmpreis (Bavarian Film Award) for Dresen as "Best Director", the Silver Hugo Award for Inka Friedrich and Nadja Uhl together as "Best Actress", and sold nearly one million tickets at the box office, making it the ninth most popular German language film of 2006.

On review aggregator website Rotten Tomatoes, the film holds an approval rating of 60% based on 15 reviews, with an average rating of 5.8/10.
