= Close to the Horizon =

2019 romantic drama film

- German theatrical release poster
- German: Dem Horizont so nah
- Directed by: Tim Trachte
- Screenplay by: Ariane Schröder
- Based on: Dem Horizont so nah by Jessica Koch
- Produced by: Kristina Löbbert
- Starring: Jannik Schümann; Luna Wedler; Stephan Kampwirth; Victoria Mayer; Luise Befort; Denis Moschitto; Frederick Lau
- Cinematography: Fabian Rösler
- Edited by: Charles Ladmiral
- Music by: Michael Kamm
- Production companies: Pantaleon Films; Studiocanal
- Distributed by: Studiocanal; M2 Pictures (Italy)
- Release date: 10 October 2019
- Running time: 117 minutes
- Countries: Germany; Portugal
- Language: German

Close to the Horizon (German: Dem Horizont so nah) is a 2019 romantic drama film directed by Tim Trachte, starring Jannik Schümann and Luna Wedler, based on the 2017 best-selling novel So Near the Horizon by Jessica Koch.

== Plot ==
18-year-old Jessica Koch falls head over heels in love with kickboxer and model Danny Taylor. However, behind his outwardly perfect facade lies a deeply traumatized person. Danny is a survivor of severe physical abuse and child sexual abuse by his father who infected him with HIV. Realizing that it is almost impossible for him to have a normal relationship, Danny blocks Jessica's attempts to get close to him, deliberately hurting her. However, the young woman does not give up. Initially, Jessica is unaware of Danny's past and illness, but notices his strange behavior in certain situations, such as when they have a bicycle accident, or his fear of physical intimacy. When an argument leads to him disclosing his childhood trauma and his HIV status to her, Jessica has some difficult life decisions to make.

== Cast ==
- Jannik Schümann as Danny
- Luna Wedler as Jessica
- Stephan Kampwirth as Jessica's father
- Victoria Mayer as Jessica's mother
- Luise Befort as Tina
- Denis Moschitto as Jörg
- Frederick Lau as Danny's coach

== Production ==
Koch's novel Dem Horizont so nah was first released as an e-book in Germany in 2016, becoming a bestseller. It was later released in print, followed by two other books, forming the trilogy series Danny–Trilogie. The second book in the trilogy focuses on Danny's growing up and the roots of his childhood trauma. Jannik Schümann, who portrayed Danny, stated that reading about the childhood sexual abuse in detail made him "furious" but helped him prepare for the role mentally.

The filming took place in September and November 2018 in Cologne, Munich, and Portugal.

The first trailer was presented in early July 2019. The film was released theatrically on October 10, 2019.

Jannik Schümann starring as Danny received the Jupiter Award for Best Actor.

== Accolades ==
- Jannik Schümann as Danny, Jupiter Award 2019 for Best Actor.
