= Life's a Glitch =

2021 Netflix series

- Release poster
- German: Life's a Glitch with Julien Bam
- Genre: Science fiction
- Directed by: Shawn Bu
- Country of origin: Germany
- Original language: German
- No. of seasons: 1
- No. of episodes: 4

Original release
- Network: Netflix
- Release: October 21, 2021

Life’s a Glitch with Julien Bam is a Netflix series starring Julien Bam and Joon Kim. The first season with 4 episodes was released on October 21, 2021, directed by Shawn Bu.

== Story ==
Julien Bam is a successful influencer who just won the "Personality of the Year" award. A car accident with his friend Joon Kim throws them to another dimension where Joon is a gangster rapper and Julien is a taxi driver. With the help of a quantum physicist, they must find their way back home.

== Cast ==
- Julien Bam: Julien
- Joon Kim: Joon
- Safira Robens: Lia
- Andreas Dyszewski: Olek
- Juri Padel: Dima
- Leon Seidel: Max
- Vivien König: Clara
- Madieu Ulbrich: Diego
- Rebecca Soraya Zaman: Hana
- Luciana Caglioti: nurse
- Daniela Lebang: nurse

== Episodes ==
Life's a Glitch is a TV Mini Series. The first season consisted of four episodes and was released on Netflix in its entirety on October 21, 2021.

No. in season	Title	Directed by	Written by	Original release date
1	"Bad Timing"	Shawn Bu	Joshua Euskirchen, Felix Charin, Shawn Bu, Julien Bam, Joon Kim	October 21, 2021
After an award party, the 'Personality of the year" Julien and his friend Joon are waking up in a world, where everything is different as it should be.
2	"Rap to Reality"	Shawn Bu	Joshua Euskirchen, Felix Charin, Shawn Bu, Julien Bam, Joon Kim	October 21, 2021
Julien and Joon, who is the famous rapper J$$N in this parallel world, are trying to find a way back home into their real dimension. But the only chance to get back is during a music video shoot for J$$Ns new song.
3	"Back to School"	Shawn Bu	Joshua Euskirchen, Felix Charin, Shawn Bu, Julien Bam, Joon Kim	October 21, 2021
Still stuck in this other world, Julien and Joon are searching for a way home with the help of a scientist for quantum mechanics and the microwave of Joons sister.
4	"LARP Is in the Air"	Shawn Bu	Joshua Euskirchen, Shawn Bu, Julien Bam, Joon Kim	October 21, 2021
After they contacted their other selves Julien and Joon have to fight through a medieval live-action-role-play event to be at the right time at the right place to get home.

== Production ==
The first season was shot between October 9, 2020 and April 16, 2021.
