= The Days Between =

2001 German drama film

- The Days Between Poster
- Directed by: Maria Speth
- Starring: Sabine Timoteo; Hiroki Mano; Florian Müller-Mohrungen
- Release date: January 2001
- Running time: 118 min
- Country: Germany
- Language: German

The Days Between (German: In den Tag hinein) is a 2001 German drama film about a young woman in Berlin. It was directed by Maria Speth.
