= Louis Hofmann =

German actor (born 1997)

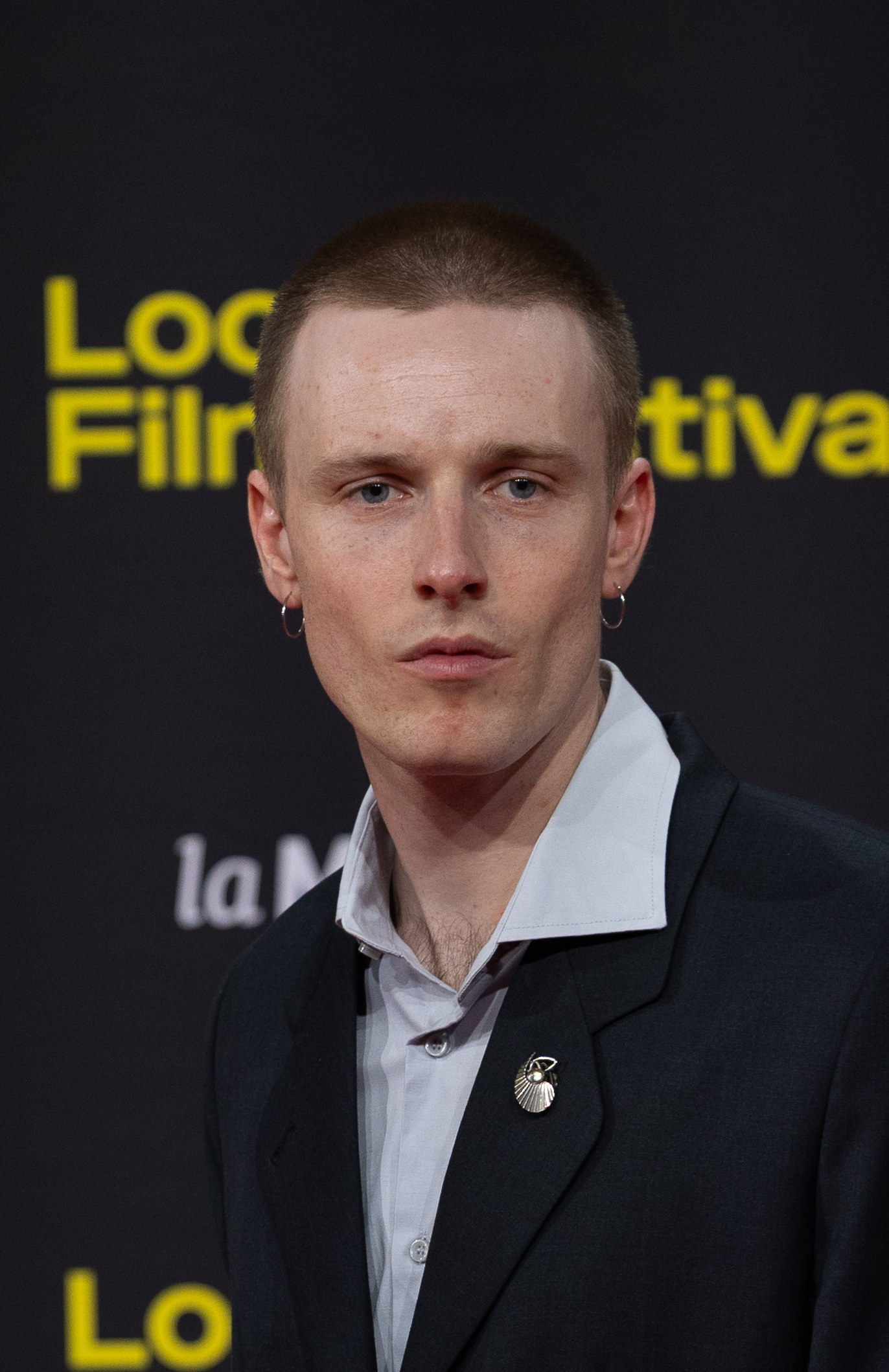
- Hofmann in 2026
- Born: 3 June 1997 (age 29); Bergisch Gladbach, North Rhine-Westphalia, Germany
- Occupation: Actor
- Years active: 2006–present

Louis Hofmann (born 3 June 1997) is a German actor. He first gained attention as the lead in the 2011 German film Tom Sawyer and won the Bodil Award for Best Supporting Actor for his role as a teenage German prisoner of war in the 2015 Danish film Land of Mine. Internationally, he is known for playing Jonas Kahnwald in the 2017 German Netflix series Dark (2017–2020).

== Life and career ==
Hofmann was born in the Bensberg district of Bergisch Gladbach and grew up in Cologne. His first experience in front of the camera was for Servicezeit, an evening magazine programme on WDR Fernsehen television network. He appeared in a section of the programme, Die Ausflieger, which tested family recreational activities. After two and a half years at Servicezeit, he decided to become an actor and applied to an acting agency. He was subsequently represented by Agentur Schwarz.

In 2009, Hofmann guest-starred in legal comedy-drama Danni Lowinski and television series The Lost Father. He also appeared in the television film Tod in Istanbul. In 2010, he performed in Wilsberg and Alarm for Cobra 11.

Hofmann's first cinematic leading role was the titular Tom Sawyer in director Hermine Huntgeburth's 2011 German film adaptation of the classic Mark Twain novel The Adventures of Tom Sawyer. Along with Leon Seidel, who played the role of Huck Finn, he sang on the soundtrack of the film in the song, "Barfuß Gehen" ("Going Barefoot"). The sequel to Tom Sawyer, The Adventures of Huck Finn (German: Die Abenteuer des Huck Finn), was released on 20 December 2012 in German cinemas. In 2013, Hofmann played a guest-starring role in an episode of the television series Stolberg. Beginning on 24 October 2013 Hofmann appeared in the comedy The Almost Perfect Man (German: Der fast perfekte Mann).

His role as Wolfgang in the 2015 film Sanctuary (German: Freistatt) directed by Marc Brummund earned him the 2015 Bavarian Film Prize as Best Newcomer Actor and the 2016 German Actors Award (Deutscher Schauspielerpreis) in the newcomer category. His first international role as a German prisoner of war in the Danish-German co-production Land of Mine (Danish: Under sandet) earned him the Best Supporting Actor prize at Denmark's Bodil Awards in 2016. At the 2016 German Film Awards, he received with the Special Prize Jaeger-LeCoultre Homage to German Cinema presented to honour the work of German actors in international films.

In 2016, Hofmann played Phil in Center of My World (German: Die Mitte der Welt), a coming-of-age romantic drama film directed by Jakob M. Erwa, based on the 1998 bestselling novel The Center of the World by Andreas Steinhöfel. He was presented with a European Shooting Stars Award at Berlinale 2017 by the European Film Promotion organisation. Also in 2016, Hofmann was cast as Jonas Kahnwald in Dark, a science fiction thriller released on Netflix on 1 December 2017. His character is one of the leads. A second season was released on 21 June 2019. A third and final season was released on 27 June 2020.

In 2022, Hofmann was cast as Werner Pfennig in the Netflix series adaptation All The Light We Cannot See, based on the 2014 novel. The series is set during World War II and was released on 2 November 2023. In March 2023, Hofmann joined the cast of Apple TV+ production Monstrous Beauty. He also appeared in Apple TV+ series Masters of the Air, produced by Tom Hanks and Steven Spielberg, which was released on 26 January 2024.

== Selected filmography ==
=== Film ===
Year	Title	Role	Notes
2011	Tom Sawyer (de)	Tom Sawyer	
2012	Die Abenteuer des Huck Finn (de)	Tom Sawyer	
2013	The Almost Perfect Man	Aaron	
2015	Sanctuary	Wolfgang	
2015	Land of Mine	Sebastian Schumann	
2016	Centre of My World	Phil	
2016	Alone in Berlin	Hans Quangel	
2017	Lommbock	Jonathan	
2017	Different Kinds of Rain	Oliver	
2018	The White Crow	Teja Kremke	
2018	Red Sparrow	Bank Manager	
2018	Down The River	Son	
2018	The New End	Dwarf (voice)	
2019	Prélude	David	
2019	The German Lesson	Klaas Jepsen	
2019	A Piece of Cake	Kipp (voice)	
2022	The Forger	Cioma Schönhaus	
2023	Seneca – On the Creation of Earthquakes	Lucilius	
2024	Lilies Not for Me	Charles	
2026	23,000 Lives	Lukas	
2026	Objet a	Adam	

=== Television ===
Year	Title	Role	Notes
2010	The Lost Father	David Salzbrenner	TV film
2010	Tod in Istanbul	Sascha Kleinert	TV film
2010	Danni Lowinski	Fabian Lüdtke	Episode: "Hundeleben"
2012	Wilsberg	Max Rensing	Episode: "Aus Mangel an Beweisen"
2013	Stolberg	Dennis Kessler	Episode: "Der verlorene Sohn"
2016	You Are Wanted	Dalton	Recurring role
2016	Shades of Guilt	Leonhard Tackler	Episode: "Das Cello"
2017–2020	Dark	Jonas Kahnwald	Main role
2022	Life After Life	Jürgen	2 episodes
2023	All the Light We Cannot See	Werner Pfennig	Miniseries; main role
2024	Masters of the Air	Ulrich Haussmann	Miniseries; 1 episode
2024	Ripley	Max Yoder	Miniseries; 1 episode

== Radio ==
Year	Title	Notes	Ref.
2006–2009	Die Ausflieger		

== Awards and nominations ==
Year	Award	Category	Work	Result	Ref.
2012	New Faces Award	Special Award	Tom Sawyer	Won	
2014	Bavarian Film Awards	Best Young Actor	Sanctuary	Won	
2015	Tokyo International Film Festival	Best Actor	Land of Mine	Won	
2016	Beijing International Film Festival	Best Actor	Land of Mine	Won	
2016	Bodil Awards	Best Actor in a Supporting Role	Land of Mine	Won	
2016	Deutscher Schauspielerpreis	Young Talent Prize	Sanctuary	Won	
2016	German Film Award	Special Award for Acting	Land of Mine	Won	
2017	Askania Award	Shooting Star of the Year	Center of My World	Won	
2017	Berlin International Film Festival	Shooting Stars Award	—	Won	
2018	Goldene Kamera	Junior Actor Prize	Dark	Won	
