= Paul Gallister =

Austrian composer (born 1984)

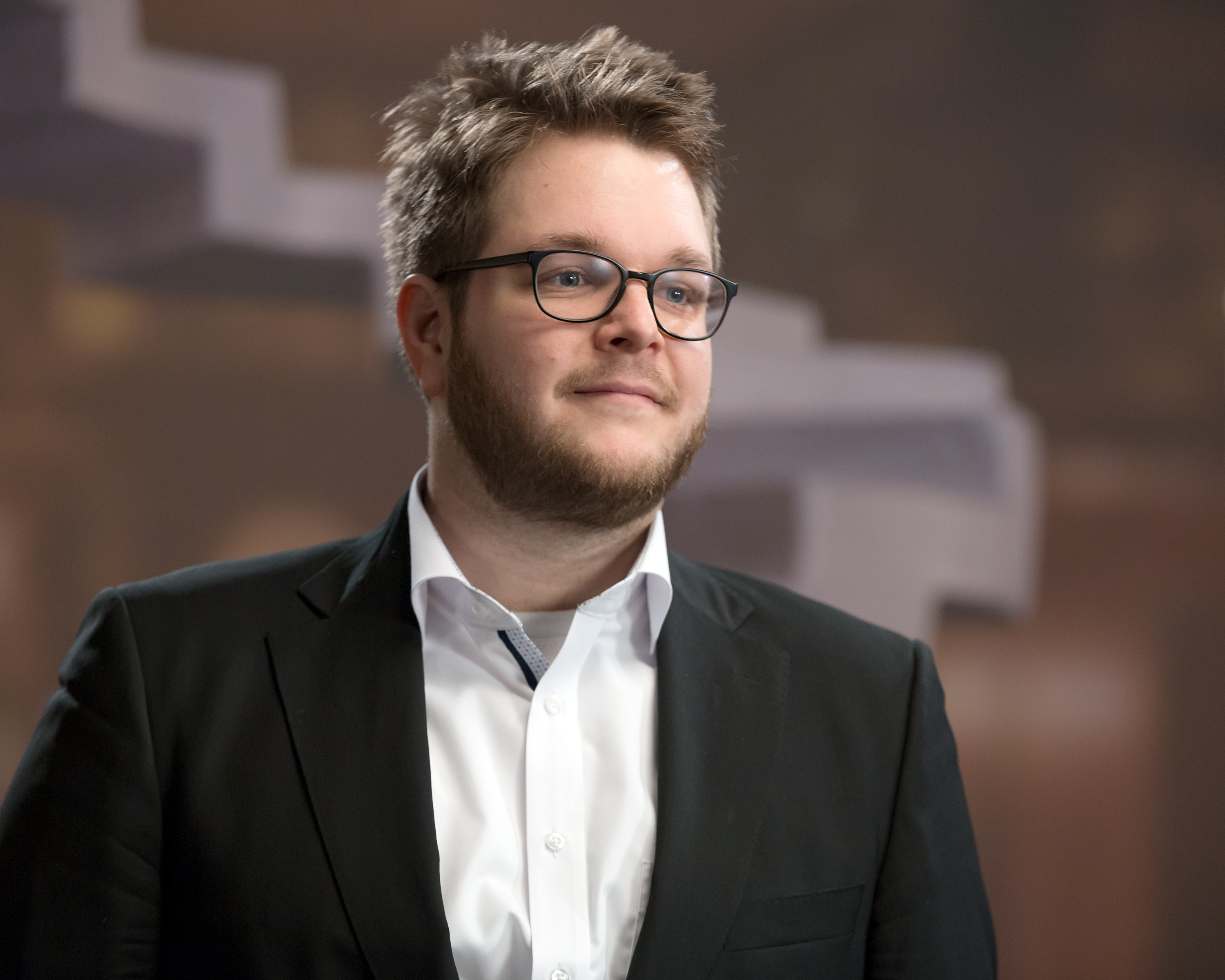
- Paul Gallister
- Born: 5 September 1984 (age 42)
- Education: University of Music and Performing Arts Vienna

Paul Gallister (born September 5, 1984 in Vienna) is an Austrian composer and music producer. He attended the University of Music and Performing Arts Vienna, where he received a Master of Arts in Media Composition.

== Projects ==
Gallister produced all five studio albums of the Viennese band Wanda – Amore (2014), Bussi (2015), Niente (2017), Ciao! (2019) and Wanda (2022) – and joined the band as live guitarist on their 2022 tour, before ending the collaboration to focus on film and television scoring. He has also worked as producer and composer for Nino aus Wien, Playing Savage, Ansa Sauermann and PauT, and produced the album 1'30 (2024) by the Austrian band Granada. He also co-produced and arranged Tocotronic's album Die Unendlichkeit (2018), and produced records for Cari Cari (Welcome to Kookoo Island, 2022) and the German band Das Moped. He co-orchestrated and programmed the winning song of the 2014 Eurovision Song Contest, Rise Like a Phoenix sung by Conchita Wurst and arranged multiple episodes of the TV series Dancing Stars and Die große Chance.

He also orchestrated several songs for the Swiss band Eluveitie’s album Helvetios.

Gallister wrote the title song for the TV series de:/Das Glück dieser Erde, a show seen throughout Europe. He has written music for films and documentaries, including Putin's Games by Israeli director Alexander Gentelev, which received the German Television Award 2014 for Best Documentary, Dominik Hartl’s short film Spitzendeckchen, and for Hartl’s film Attack of the Lederhosen Zombies. With Matthias Weber, he won the award for Best Film Music at the 2015 Biarritz Film Festival for Weber's film "Beautiful Girl." In 2017, he won the Austrian Film Award for Best Film Music for the film Die Mitte der Welt

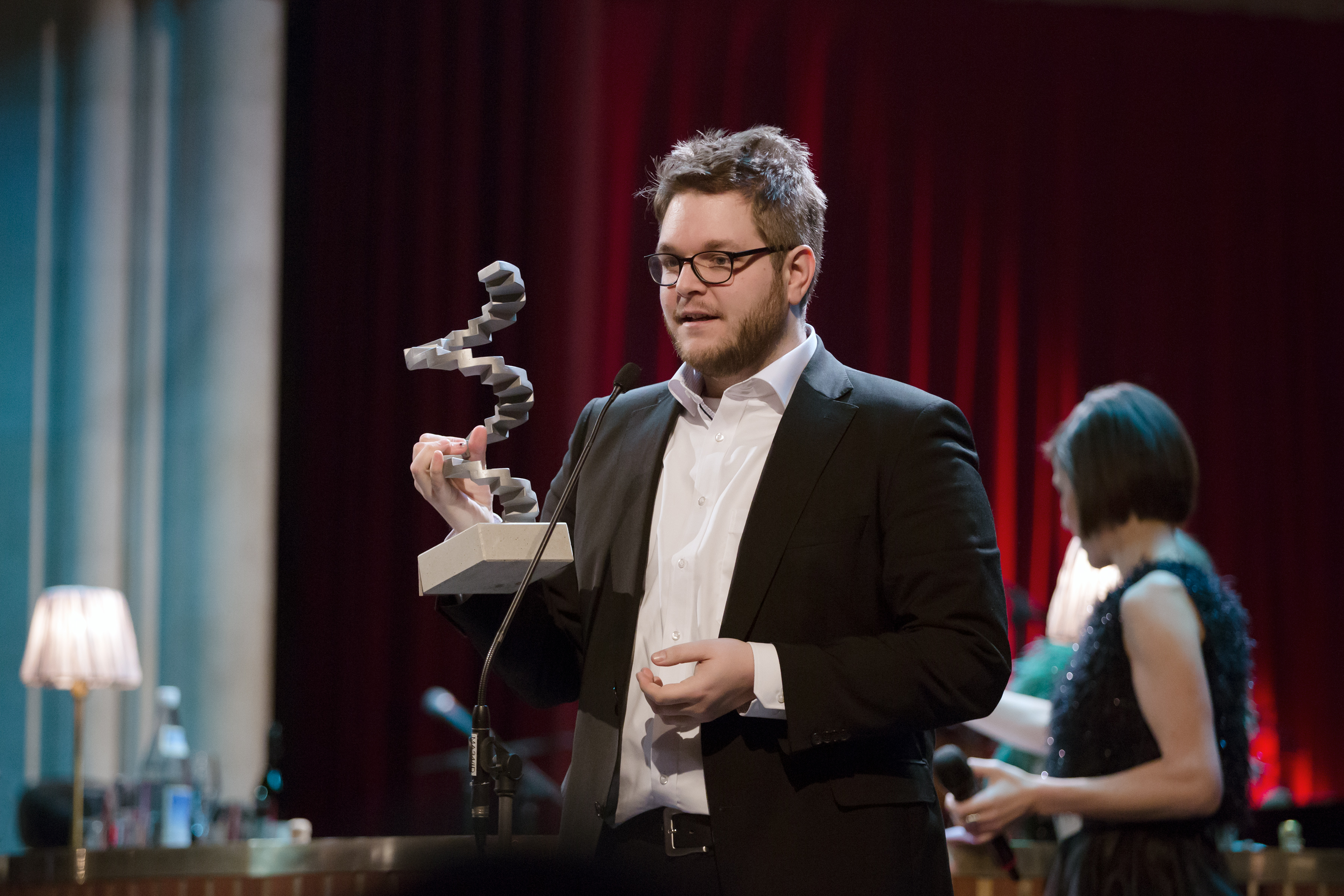
Paul Gallister receiving the award for "Best Film Music" at the Austrian Film Awards 2017

Since the late 2010s, Gallister has increasingly concentrated on film and television scores. He wrote the music for the documentaries Liebe war es nie (Love It Was Not, 2020), Der Bauer und der Bobo (2022) and Kurt Langbein's Projekt Ballhausplatz (2023), as well as for Dominik Hartl's Tatort episode Azra (2023), the Amazon Prime Video series Beasts Like Us (2024) and twelve episodes of the BR/ORF series School of Champions (2024–2025). His international credits include the American feature films Muzzle (2023) and The Winter Kills (2023), as well as the Austrian Amazon Prime Video series Followers (2024).

In 2021, Gallister was the artistic director of the opening concert of the Wiener Festwochen.

Gallister co-wrote, with his Kollektiv Sound42 partner Lukas Hasitschka, the music for Tight Lines Fishing, which won the Deutscher Entwicklerpreis in 2011 for Best Social Game.

Gallister is a member of the Austrian Composer's Association and the International Society for Contemporary Music.

== Filmography ==
Year	Film
2012	Spitzendeckchen
2013	Putin's Games
2015	Beautiful Girl
2015	Turning Cold
2015	Life:Patented
2016	Karussell
2016	Final Analysis
2016	Attack of the Lederhosen Zombies
2016	Die Mitte der Welt
2020	Liebe war es nie
2022	Der Bauer und der Bobo
2023	Tatort: Azra
2023	Projekt Ballhausplatz
2023	Muzzle
2023	The Winter Kills
2023	Vienna Calling
2024	Followers (TV series)
2024	Beasts Like Us (TV series)
2024–2025	School of Champions (TV series)
2025	Muzzle: City of Wolves
2025	Dann passiert das Leben

== Music Productions/Compositions ==
Year	Work
2012	Eluveitie - Helvetios
2014	Wanda - Amore
2015	Wanda - Bussi
2016	Nino aus Wien - Adria
2016	Playing Savage - Bigger
2016	Nino aus Wien - Wach
2017	Wanda - Niente
2018	Tocotronic - Die Unendlichkeit
2019	Wanda - Ciao!
2019	Das Moped - Alle wollen Liebe
2020	Das Moped - Erstaunlich klar
2022	Cari Cari - Welcome to Kookoo Island
2022	Wanda - Wanda
2024	Granada - 1'30

== Awards ==
Paul Gallister's work has received a range of awards, including the Austrian Film Award for Best Film Music and multiple Amadeus Austrian Music Awards for Wanda and Nino aus Wien.

Year	Nominee / work	Award	Result
2011	Tight Lines Fishing	Deutscher Entwicklerpreis	Won
2012	Per Se	Joseph Haydn European Chamber Music Award	Won
2015	Beautiful Girl	Biarritz Film Festival – Best Film Music	Won
2015	Wanda	Amadeus Austrian Music Award – Best Alternative Pop/Rock and FM4 Radio People’s Choice Award	Won
2016	Nino aus Wien	Amadeus Austrian Music Award – Best Pop/Rock, Best Live Act, Best Band (Wanda) and Best Alternative Pop/Rock	Won
2017	Die Mitte der Welt	Austrian Film Award – Best Film Music	Won
