= The Almost Perfect Man =

2013 German romantic comedy film

- Theatrical release poster
- Directed by: Vanessa Jopp
- Written by: Jane Ainscough
- Produced by: Nico Hofmann; Jürgen Schuster; Gesa Tönnesen
- Starring: Benno Fürmann; Louis Hofmann
- Cinematography: Dixie Schmiedle
- Edited by: Brigitta Tauchner
- Music by: Alex Geringas; Joachim Schlüter
- Production companies: UFA Cinema; Degeto Film
- Distributed by: Warner Bros. Pictures
- Release date: 24 October 2013
- Running time: 93 minutes
- Country: Germany
- Language: German

The Almost Perfect Man (German: Der fast perfekte Mann) is a 2013 German romantic comedy film directed by Vanessa Jopp.

== Cast ==
- Benno Fürmann as Ulf
- Louis Hofmann as Aaron
- Jördis Triebel as Anni
- Maria Happel as Doris
- Ross Antony as Justin
- Harald Schrott as Gustav
- Martin Brambach as Norbert Henssler
- Florentine Lahme as Nike Guldener
- Collien Fernandes as Suzie von Plauen
- Thomas Balou Martin as Dr. Darsow
