= Julien Bam =

German internet personality (born 1988)

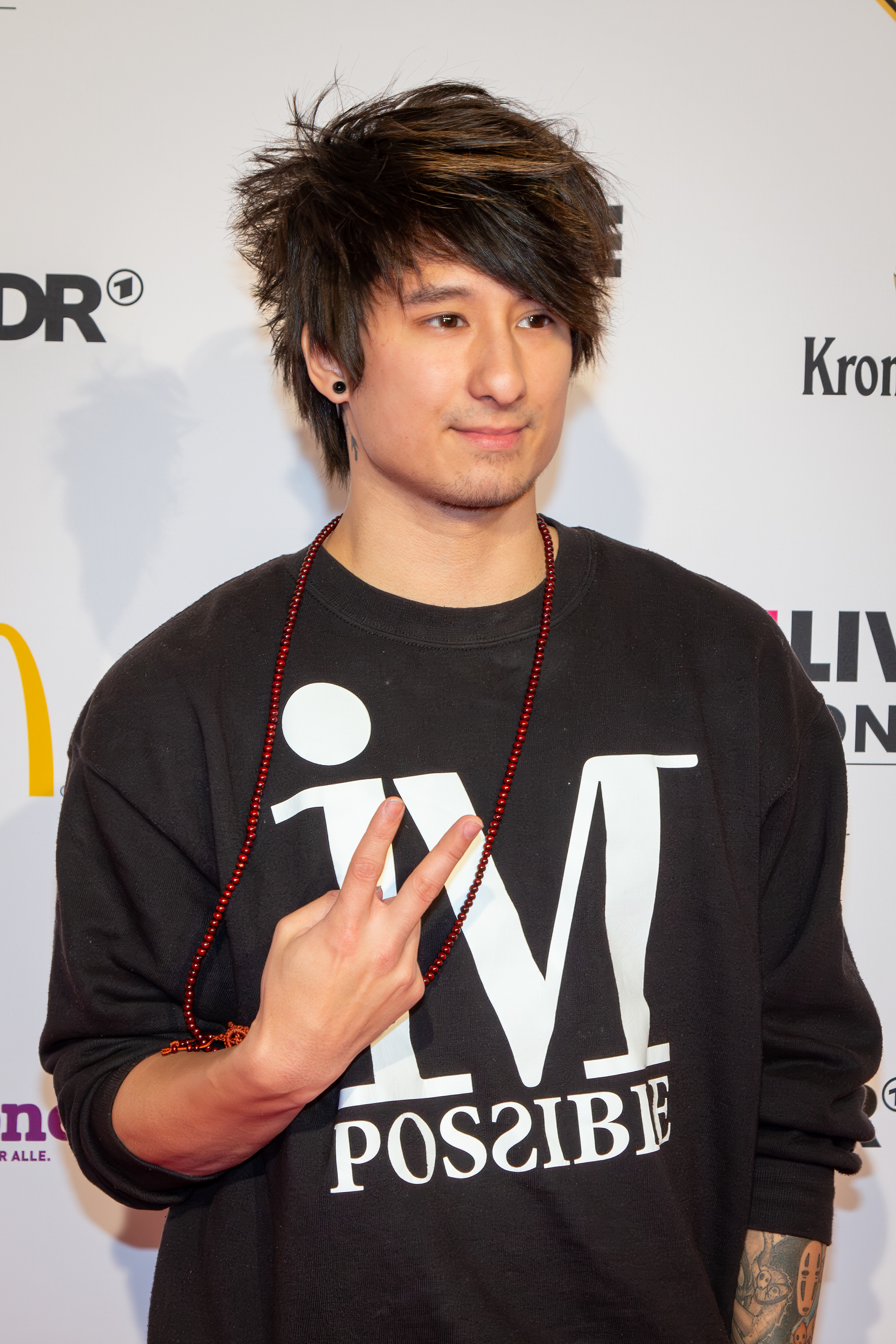
- Bam in 2015
- Born: 23 November 1988 (age 37); Aachen
- Occupations: Actor; singer; dancer; YouTuber
- Awards: Bravo Otto; 1LIVE Krone; Webvideopreis Deutschland; Kids' Choice Awards

YouTube information
- Channel: Julien Bam
- Years active: 2013–2025
- Genres: Comedy; Music; Dance
- Subscribers: 6.21 million
- Views: 1.7 billion
- Last updated: 30 January 2026

Julien Zheng Zheng Kho Budorovits (born 23 November 1988), better known as Julien Bam, is a German actor, singer, dancer and internet personality. He began his YouTube channel in 2013, and uploaded music videos and large-scale projects until his retirement in 2025.

In 2015, Bam won the Bravo Otto award for Best Social Media Star. In 2015 and 2016, he won the 1LIVE Krone awards for Best Video. In 2016, he won the Webvideopreis Deutschland award for Person of the Year. In 2017, he won the Webvideopreis Deutschland Golden Camera Digital Award. During the 2017 German presidential election, he was a delegate of the Social Democratic Party to the Federal Convention. He was the most-viewed German YouTuber in 2017, having uploaded six of the top ten most popular videos of the year as curated by Google, excluding traditional music videos. In 2018, he joined the jury of the dance competition show Masters of Dance. He won the Favorite Big Kid award at the 2018 and the 2020 Kids' Choice Awards.

In 2019, Bam announced his intention to retire from his main YouTube channel, citing heavy workload and health problems. He planned to make three final videos to conclude an ongoing video series, and eventually made 16 new videos until his retirement in 2025. From 2020 to 2024, he starred as Sonic the Hedgehog in the German-language dubbings of Sonic the Hedgehog, Sonic the Hedgehog 2 and Sonic the Hedgehog 3. In 2021, he starred as himself in the Netflix series Life's a Glitch. In 2025, he donated his gaming channel JuTubeGaming to fellow YouTuber Sturmwaffel.

== Personal life ==
Bam was born in Aachen, but briefly raised in Singapore, where his mother, a Chinese Indonesian, was born. His father is from the Czech Republic, with Czech, Romanian and Russian ancestry. Bam has a brother, Shawn, who is also a video content creator.

Between 2018 and 2019, Bam ran a dance school in Cologne, which closed down due to financial issues.
