= Crooks (TV series) =

- Promotional release poster
- Genre: Thriller; Drama
- Written by: Benjamin Hessler; Georg Lippert; Marvin Kren
- Directed by: Marvin Kren; Cüneyt Kaya
- Starring: Frederick Lau; Christoph Krutzler; Svenja Jung
- Music by: Stefan Will; Schallbauer
- Country of origin: Germany
- Original language: German
- No. of seasons: 2
- No. of episodes: 14

Production
- Producers: Quirin Berg; Max Wiedemann
- Cinematography: Xiaosu Han; Andreas Thalhammer
- Editors: Jan Hille; Christoph Loidl; Christoph Brunner
- Camera setup: Multi-camera
- Running time: 40–67 min
- Production company: W&B Television

Original release
- Network: Netflix
- Release: April 4, 2024 – present

Crooks is a German thriller drama television series written and directed by Marvin Kren. Produced under W&B Television, and stars Frederick Lau, Christoph Krutzler and Svenja Jung. The series premiered on Netflix on April 4, 2024. On 25 June 2024, Netflix renewed it for a second season which premiered on 14 April 2026.

== Cast ==
- Frederick Lau as Charly
- Christoph Krutzler as Joseph
- Svenja Jung as Samira
- Karl Welunschek as Der Rote, aka Red
- Georg Friedrich as Zwanziger/Joe Berger
- Jonathan Tittel as Jonas
- Kida Khodr Ramadan as Rami
- Erdal Yıldız as Hassan Al Walid
- Nima Yaghobi as Tarek Al Walid
- Lukas Watzl as Rio
- Maya Unger as Nina Oblomow
- Jan Georg Schütte as Henning
- Robert Finster as Robert Seidler
- Veysel Gelin as Karim Al Walid
- Branko Samarovski as Der Großein Crooks/Karal
- Brigitte Kren as Tante Margot
- Virginie Peignien as Griselda Delacroix
- Klara Mucci as Alina Ionescu

== Production ==
The series was announced on Netflix. It is based on the Big Maple Leaf heist (2017). It marks the second collaboration between Marvin Kren, Frederick Lau and Kida Khodr Ramadan after 4 Blocks (2017). The principal photography of the series commenced in April 2022 and wrapped up in August 2022. The trailer of the series was released on March 5, 2024.

== Reception ==
On the review aggregator website Rotten Tomatoes, 80% of 5 critics' reviews are positive, with an average rating of 5.7/10. Ty'Kira Smalls of Common Sense Media gave the series a grade of four out of five stars. Joel Keller of Decider reviewed the series.
