= Vincent Redetzki =

German actor

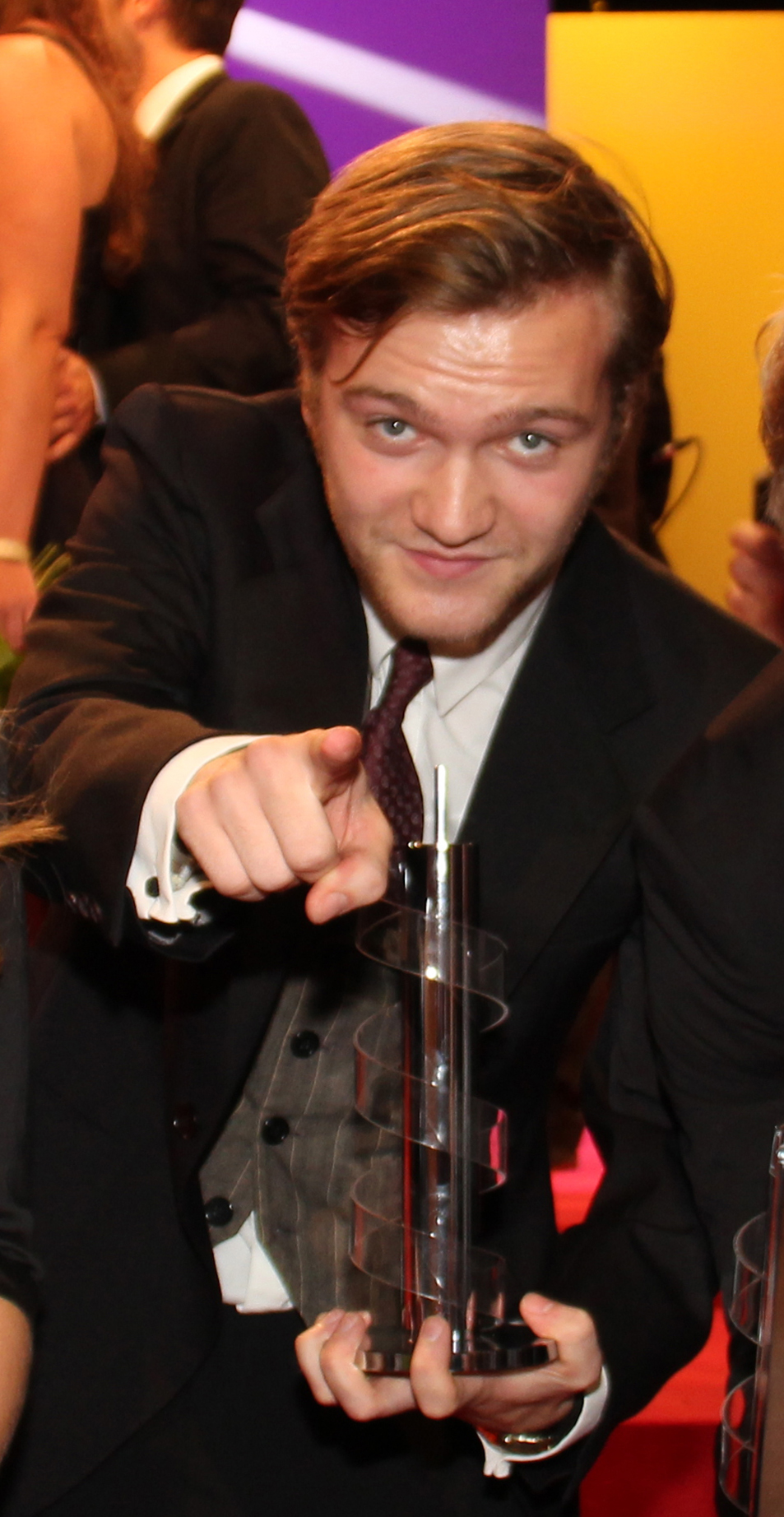
- Vincent Redetzki in 2012.
- Born: Vincent Redetzki; 1 April 1992 (age 34); Berlin, Germany
- Occupation: Actor

Vincent Redetzki (born 1 April 1992) is a German actor.

== Career ==
Redetzki was born in Charlottenburg, Berlin, Germany. At the age of nine, he played his first small role in a play at the Theater am Kurfürstendamm. Two years later in 2003, he played his first leading role in the play Unter Eis (Under Ice) by Falk Richter at the Schaubühne in Berlin. Since then, he has played in a few plays of Richter: (2006 Die Verstörung, 2007 Im Ausnahmezustand, 2009 Trust)

In 2003 he played the child leading role in Andreas Dresen's Movie Summer in Berlin (Original: Sommer vorm Balkon) and continued his work in playing the character Willi in the German teen movie Wild Chicks (2006), Wild Chicks in Love (2007) and The Wild Chicks and Life (2009).

The TV-Mini-Series Die Wölfe, with Redetzki in one of the leading roles, won the Emmy Award in 2009 as best TV Movie/Mini-Series, and the kids ensemble received the German Television Promotional Award.

== Filmography ==
=== Film ===
- 2004: Stauffenberg, as Berthold Junior Stauffenberg
- 2005: Summer in Berlin, as Max
- 2006: Wild Chicks, as Willi
- 2007: Wild Chicks in Love, as Willi
- 2009: The Wild Chicks and Life, as Willi
- 2009: For Miriam (Shortfilm), as Lukas Fleißer
- 2010: The Coming Days, as Phillip
- 2013: Whispers Behind the Wall, as Martin
- 2014: Jack
- 2015: Buddha's Little Finger

=== TV ===
- 1998: Gute Zeiten, schlechte Zeiten
- 2003: Für alle Fälle Stefanie
- 2004: Was heißt hier Oma! (by Ariane Zeller)
- 2005: The Airlift (by Dror Zahavi)
- 2009: Die Wölfe (by Friedemann Fromm)
- 2009: Tatort: Mit ruhiger Hand (by Maris Pfeiffer)
- 2010: Leipzig Homicide (by Maris Pfeiffer)
- 2010: Der Doc und die Hexe (by Vivian Naefe)
- 2011: Tatort: Tod einer Lehrerin (by Thomas Freundner)
- 2011: Der Doc und die Hexe (Part 3 and 4) (by Vivian Naefe)
- 2012: Mittlere Reife (by Martin Enlen)
- 2012: Tatort: Im Namen des Vaters (by Lars Kraume)
- 2022: Kleo
- 2024: Levi Strauss and the stuff of dreams, directed by Neele Leana Vollmar (ARD)

== Theatre ==
- 2009: TRUST of Falk Richter, Schaubühne am Lehniner Platz, Berlin
- 2009: Endstation Sehnsucht (By: Benedict Andrews)
- 2007: Im Ausnahmezustand of Falk Richter (UA), Schaubühne am Lehniner Platz, Berlin
- 2005: Die Verstörung of Falk Richter (UA), Schaubühne am Lehniner Platz, Berlin
- 2005: Stoning Mary, Schaubühne am Lehniner Platz
- 2004: Phaidras Liebe, Schaubühne am Lehniner Platz
- 2004: Unter Eis of Falk Richter (UA), Schaubühne am Lehniner Platz, Berlin
- 2001: Macbeth
- 2001: Fenster zum Flur, Theater am Kurfürstendamm

== Awards ==
- 2009: German Television Promotional Award for Die Wölfe
- 2006: Undine Award as Best Filmdebut in Summer in Berlin
