= Svenja Jung =

German actress (born 1993)

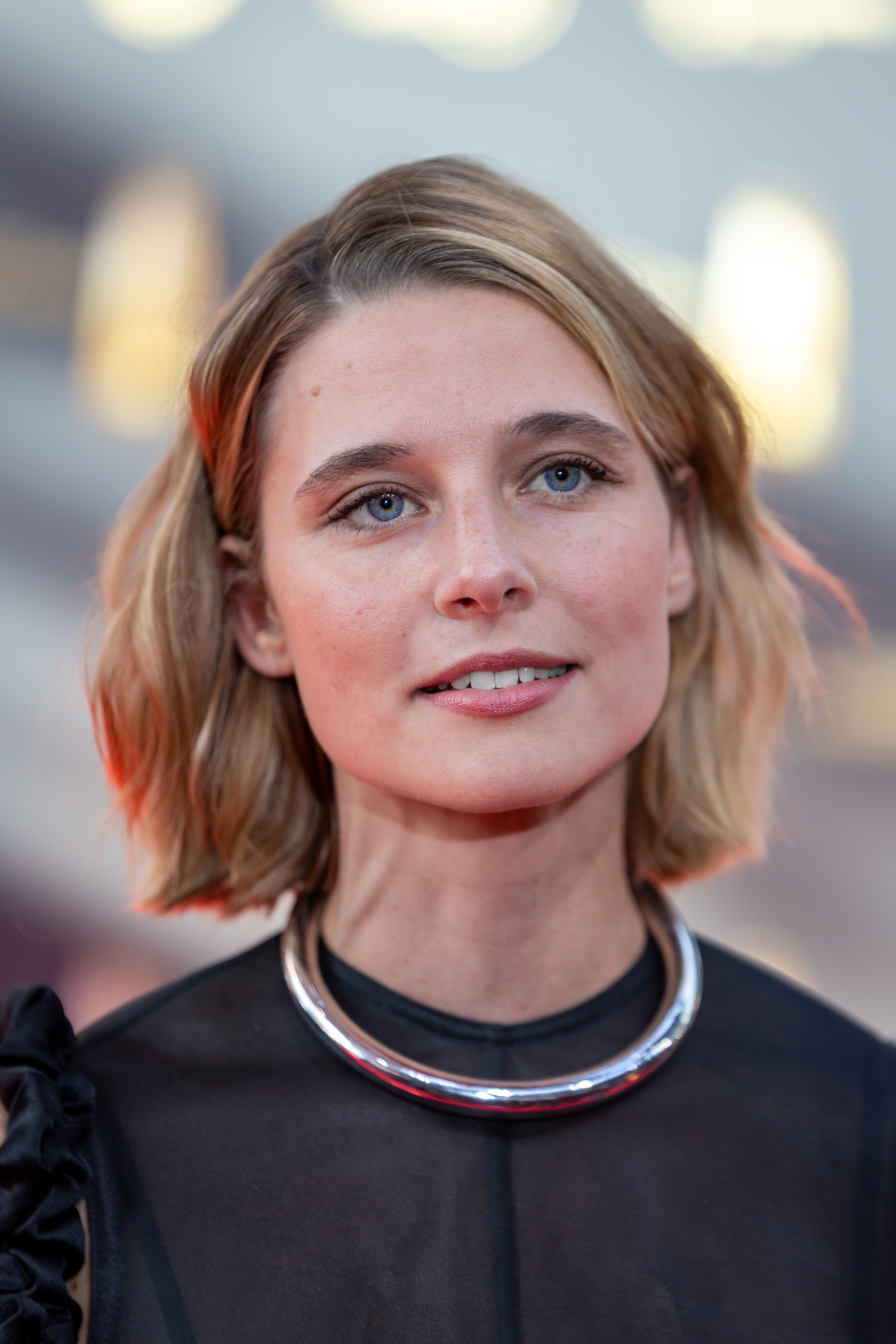
- Jung in 2025
- Born: 28 May 1993 (age 33); Weroth, Rhineland-Palatinate, Germany
- Education: Fachhochschule Potsdam
- Occupation: Actress
- Years active: 2011–present

Svenja Jung (born 28 May 1993 in Weroth) is a German actress.

== Career ==
Jung completed her final school exams in 2012 and took acting lessons at the Juniorhouse in Cologne. She then performed in TV series Zwischen Kindheit und Erwachsensein by Bayerischer Rundfunk and she worked as a model. She also performed in TV commercials and short movies.

Jung played Sonia Rossi in the feature film Fucking Berlin and performed in the film adaptation of Andreas Steinhöfel's The Center of the World as Kat 2015. More lead roles followed. In the ZDF film Ostfriesenkiller, she portrayed the mentally disabled Sylvia Kleine. For her three leading roles, Jung was nominated for the New Faces Award 2017 as best young actress.

Jung also studied European media science at Fachhochschule Potsdam.

== Filmography ==
Year	Title	Role	Notes
2011	Stamp Amsterdam		
2012	Der Schlüssel		
2013	Zwischen Kindheit und Erwachsensein		Bayrischer Rundfunk
2014	Besonders		Short movie
2014	Sirene		Filmakademie Ludwigsburg
2015	Unter uns	Lisa Brück	TV series
2015	Heldt	Mandy	Episode: Wehrlos
2016	Fucking Berlin	Sonja	feature film
2016	Verrückt nach Fixi	Mädel	cinema movie
2016	Center of My World	Kat	cinema movie
2016	The Old Fox	Johanna	Episode: Paradiesvogel
2016	Darth Maul: Apprentice	Jedi Apprentice	Short movie
2017	Ostfriesenkiller	Sylvia Kleine	Feature Film
2017	Armans Geheimnis	Milena	TV series
2017	Letzte Spur Berlin	Anna Schrader	TV series
2017	Tatort - Wer jetzt alleine ist	Bird	TV series
2017	Electric Girl	Lissy	cinema movie
2017	A Gschicht über d'Lieb	Maria	cinema movie
2017	Beat	Nani	Amazon series
2017	Zarah - Wilde Jahre	Jenny Olsen	TV series
2018	Tsokos - Zersetzt	Jana Forster	TV movie
2018	Jenseits der Angst	Karin Korschak	TV movie
2018	Der süße Brei	Jola	TV movie
2020	Dark	Sonja Tannhaus	Netflix Original Series
2020	Deutschland 89	Nicole Zangen	TV series
2021	Der Palast	Christine Steffen / Marlene Wenninger	TV miniseries
2021	Fly	Bex	cinema movie
2022	The Empress	Countess Louise Gundemann	Netflix Original Series
2023	Spy/Master	Ingrid von Weizendorff	HBO
2023	Baghead	Sarah	
2024	Sexuell verfügbar	Bianca Hellmann	TV miniseries
2024	Crooks	Samira Treptow Markovic	TV series
2025	Fall for Me	Lilli	Netflix film
2026	Highter & Wolkig	Svenja	TV series
