= Leon Seidel =

German actor

- Born: November 22, 1996 (age 29); Cologne, Germany
- Occupation: Actor
- Years active: 2008–present

Leon Seidel (born November 22, 1996) is a German actor. He is known for playing the role of "Huckleberry Finn" in the German film of 2011 Tom Sawyer.

== Life and career ==
Seidel was born in Cologne. His talent for acting, says Seidel, he had inherited from his father, who works in a cabaret group. Would be 2008, then 11-year-old made his debut in Kaspar Heidelbach's movie Berlin '36 and completed several appearances in the TV comedy Stromberg, where he played the son of Jennifer Schirrmann (Milena Thirty) and almost the stepson of the infamous bosses become.

It was followed by a supporting role in the sports comedy Devil's Kickers by Granz Henman, who came in 2010 in the cinemas and made known on the side of stars such as Armin Rohde and Benno Furmann a wider cinema audience the young actor. Since October 2011, the young actor is seen in his first major role in John Schmid's German-Polish drama Winter's Daughter.

Only a month later he work for Hermine Huntgeburth's Tom Sawyer, in which the young actor take on the role of the orphan Huckleberry Finn and acting on the side of Louis Hofmann who play the title character. In 2012 took on the lead role in the sequel The Adventures of Huck Finn.

In addition to his acting work Leon Seidel can also be heard as a speaker.

== Filmography ==
Year	Title	Role	Notes
2009	Berlin 36	Walter Bergmann	
2009	Stromberg	Helge	Episode: Helge
2009	Tatort: Der Fluch der Mumie		TV movie
2010	Wintertochter	Knäcke	
2011	Tom Sawyer	Huckleberry Finn	
2011	Stromberg	Helge	Episodes: Frau Wilhelmi, Der Nachfolger
2012	The Adventures of Huck Finn	Huckleberry Finn	
2014	The Chosen Ones	Frank Hoffmann	
2015	Land of Mine	Wilhelm LeBern	
2021	Life's a Glitch	Max	

== Awards and nominations ==
Year	Award	Category	Work	Result
2011	New Faces Award	Bester Kinderfilmdarsteller	Wintertochter	Won
2012	New Faces Award	Bestes Jugendtalent	Tom Sawyer	Won
