= Check It =

- Theatrical release poster
- Directed by: Dana Flor; Toby Oppenheimer
- Cinematography: Toby Oppenheimer
- Music by: Paul Brill
- Distributed by: LouisCK.net and Louis C.K. app
- Release dates: April 15, 2016 (Tribeca); June 15, 2016
- Running time: 91 minutes
- Country: United States
- Language: English

Check It is a 2016 American documentary film directed by Dana Flor and Toby Oppenheimer. The film explores African-American gay and transgender youths in Washington D.C. who founded their own gang for self-protection.

In July 2017, comedian Louis C.K., who saw the film at one of its original screenings and thought that the film was "funny and moving" and gave him "a lot to think about," made the film available for download or streaming on his website.
