= Agustín Pardella =

Argentine actor and musician (born 1994)

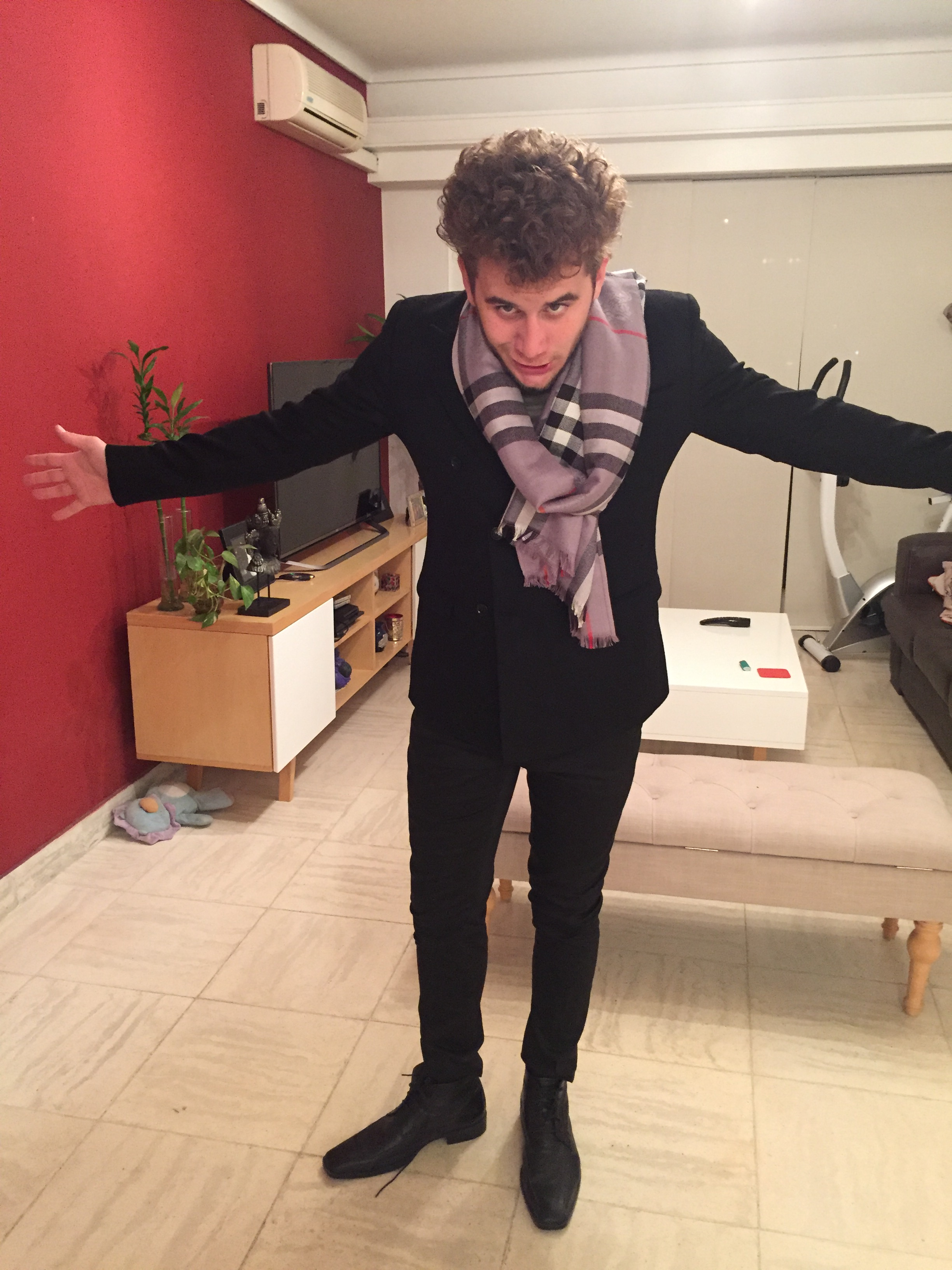
Agustín Pardella in 2016.

Agustín Pardella (Buenos Aires, January 12, 1994) is an Argentine actor and singer. Pardella started his career in 2011, and has been nominated for and won several awards.

== Biography ==
Pardella's actorial debut was in 2011 as a teenager in the film Un amor, directed by Paula Hernández, alongside Diego Peretti, Elena Roger, and Luis Ziembrowski.

Pardella was nominated for the Silver Condor Award for Best New Actor (Revelación Masculina) 2017 for the film Como una novia sin sexo.

In 2017, he won three awards for the dramatic film Pinamar with Juan Grandinetti, directed by Federico Godfrid. He also acted in the film Los olvidados, which premiered in March 2018 in Argentina. It won four awards in several film festivals throughout the Americas and Europe.

He has won various awards for his work in Pinamar: Golden Kikito Award for Best Actor (Kikito de Ouro) at the August 2017 Festival de Gramado in Brazil, Patacon Award for Best Actor (Premio Patacón a Mejor Actor) at the 2017 Festival Tandil Cine, which was awarded by SAGAI. He got a special mention by a judge at the 2017 XV Tandil Cine. In 2019, he was a juror at the Mar del Plata International Film Festival

After many years in film and TV, he made his theatrical debut in Fraternal, in Método Kairos.

In 2018, he starred in Martín Deus's film Los Enanos, in the Porteño Theater. In 2020, he appeared in the film Ámbar.

=== Society of the Snow ===
A breakthrough in Pardella's career was in 2023, when he portrayed Nando Parrado, one of the survivors of Uruguayan Air Force Flight 571 in the film Society of the Snow (La sociedad de la nieve). The film, directed by Juan Antonio Bayona, was nominated for the Academy Award for Best International Feature Film at the 96th Academy Awards. Pardella underwent intense physical and mental preparation, which was essential to give life to the drama experienced by the character. He explored an intimate relationship with Parrado in order to portray his extreme real-life experiences surviving 72 days in the snow. Further, he had to gain 10 kilos to start filming, and then lose 15 kilos, in order to show the physical deterioration suffered by Parrado.

Pardella and his co-stars described shooting the film as an emotional challenge. After meeting Parrado in person, Pardella stated: "What can I say about my favorite superhero? Oh, I know… he is made of flesh and blood, human, he does not have super powers and his name is Nando Parrado."

== Filmography ==
=== Film ===
Year	Title	Role	Notes
2011	Un amor	Lalo (adolescent)	
2012	It happens		Short film
2014	Abril	Pablo	Short film
2015	Francisco: El padre Jorge (Francis: Pray For Me)	Cacho	
2016	Como una novia sin sexo (Bromance)	Adrián Aued	
2017	Pinamar	Miguel	
2017	Los olvidados	Diego	
2018	La religiosa		Short film
2020	Ámbar	Junior	
2023	Society of the Snow	Nando Parrado	

=== Television ===
Year	Titles	Role	Nates
2012-2013	Mi amor, mi amor	Ariel Dalton	
2012	Condicionados	Rodrigo	
2013	Los vecinos en guerra	Nahuel	
2013	Esa mujer	Manuel	
2014-2016	La casa del mar	Martín Meléndez	
2015	Noche y día	Manuel Pablo Otoño	
2016, 2022	Loco por vos	Víctor Sarkissián	
2017	Las Estrellas	Ciro	
2018	Simona	Ambientalista	
2018	El lobista (The Lobbyist)	Nicolás	
2018-2019	Todo por el juego	Germán	
2022	Cielo grande (Secrets of Summer)	Noda	

== Awards and nominations ==
Year	Award	Category	Film	Result
2017	Silver Condor Award	Best New Actor	Bromance	Nominated
2017	Festival de Gramado	Kikito de Ouro for Best New Actor	Pinamar	Won
2017	Tandil Cine Festival	Patacon Award for Best Actor	Pinamar	Won
2017	Tandil Cine Festival	Jury Special Mention	Pinamar	Won
