= Pinamar (film) =

2017 film by Federico Godfrid

- Directed by: Federico Godfrid
- Written by: Lucia Möller
- Produced by: Ignacio Rey; Gastón Rothschild; Alex Zito; Juan Pablo García
- Cinematography: Fernando Lockett
- Edited by: Valeria Otheguy
- Music by: Daniel Godfrid
- Release date: 2017
- Country: Argentina
- Language: Spanish

Pinamar is a 2017 Argentine drama film directed by Federico Godfrid.

== Plot ==
Brothers Pablo and Miguel return to the coastal resort town of Pinamar during the off-season following the death of their mother. Their primary objectives are to scatter her ashes in the Atlantic Ocean and finalize the sale of the family's long-held summer apartment.

== Cast ==
- Lautaro Churruarín - Tomás
- Juan Grandinetti - Pablo
- Violeta Palukas - Laura
- Agustín Pardella - Miguel

== Accolades ==
Year	Award	Category	Nominated	Result
2017	Punta del Este Film Festival	Best Actor	Juan Grandinetti	Won
2017	Premios Sur	Best New Actor	Juan Grandinetti	Nominated
2017	Silver Condor Award	Best New Actor	Juan Grandinetti	Nominated
2017	Silver Condor Award	Opera prima	Federico Godfrid	Nominated
2017	Festival de Gramado - Kikito de Ouro	Best New Actor	Juan Grandinetti	Won
2017	Festival de Gramado - Kikito de Ouro	Best New Actor	Agustín Pardella	Won
2017	Festival de Gramado - Kikito de Ouro	Best Director	Federico Godfrid	Won
