= Memories of a Penitent Heart =

2016 American documentary film directed by Cecilia Aldarondo

- Directed by: Cecilia Aldarondo
- Written by: Cecilia Aldarondo
- Produced by: Cecilia Aldarondo, Patricia Benabe
- Cinematography: Brennan Vance
- Edited by: Hannah Buck
- Music by: Angélica Negrón
- Release date: April 15, 2016 (Tribeca)
- Running time: 74 minutes
- Country: United States
- Languages: English; Spanish

Memories of a Penitent Heart is an American documentary film which premiered at the Tribeca Film Festival in 2016 and aired in shortened form on PBS's documentary series POV on July 31, 2017. Written and directed by Cecilia Aldarondo, the film centers on her attempts to find out more about the life and death of her uncle Miguel Dieppa, an aspiring actor and playwright who died of an AIDS-related illness when Aldarondo was six years old and had only ever met him once.

The film had its genesis when Aldarondo received some old family home movies, including footage of Dieppa, from her mother. Knowing that her uncle's partner's name was Robert but not knowing his last name, she eventually succeeds in tracking him down through the film's Kickstarter campaign — he is now living as a Roman Catholic priest going by the name of Father Aquin.

Through interviews with Aquin, other friends who knew them and her own family, she uncovers the complicated emotional truth of his life and death, in particular the conflict between Miguel's partner and his staunchly Catholic mother Carmen as Miguel was dying of AIDS.
