= Inka Friedrich =

German actress (born 1965)

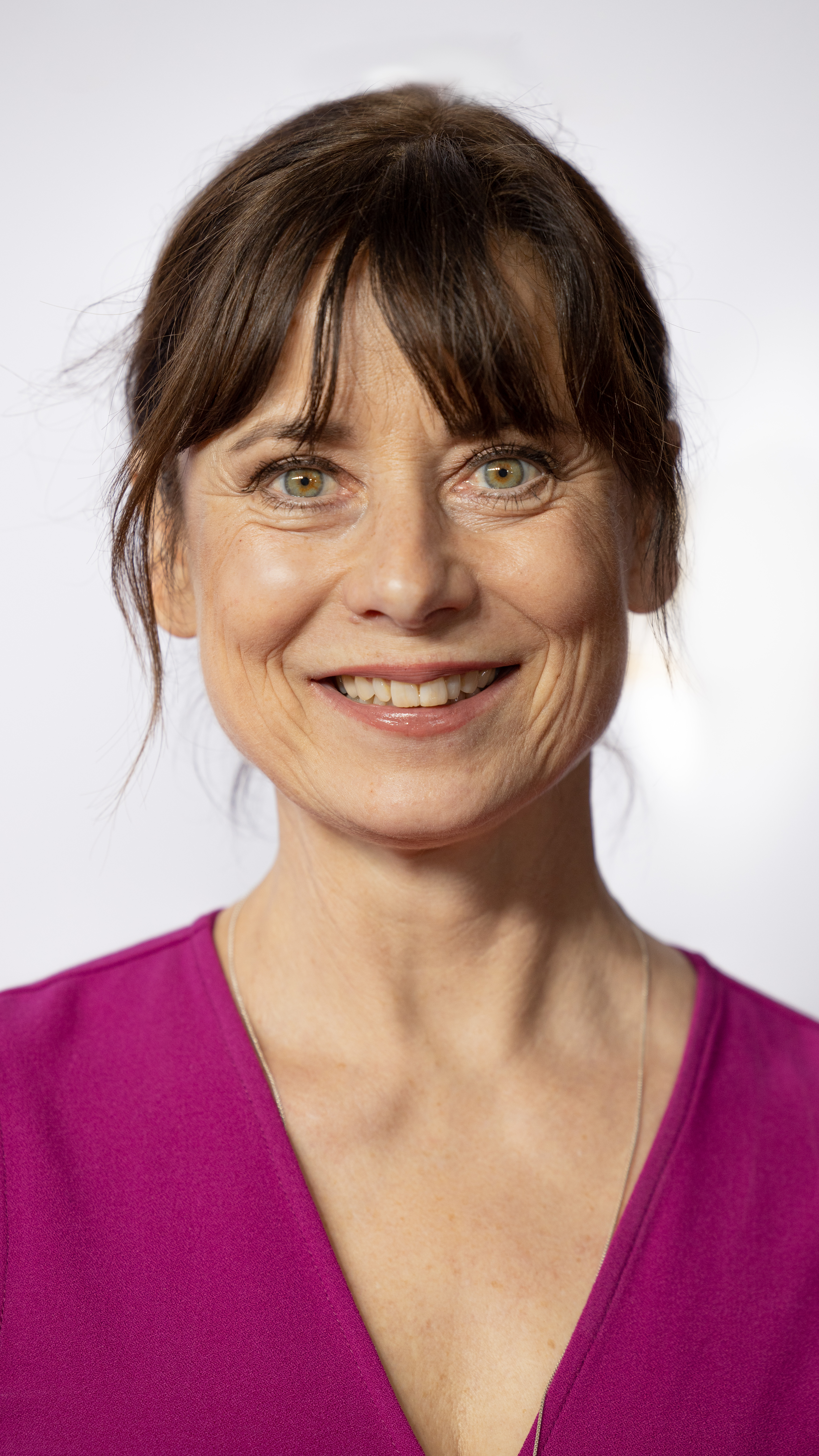
- Born: 1 November 1965 (age 59); Freiburg im Breisgau, West Germany

Inka Friedrich (born 1 November 1965 in Freiburg im Breisgau) is a German actress.

Having studied at the Berlin University of the Arts, Friedrich won the Silver Hugo Award for Best Actress for her starring role in the 2005 film Summer in Berlin.

== Biography ==
Inka Friedrich grew up with parents and a brother in southern Germany. She attended a high school and received her acting lessons from 1984 to 1988 at the HdK in Berlin. After graduating from drama school, she was hired at the Theater Basel, where she had her first major success as Käthchen von Heilbronn, directed by Cesare Lievi. In 1990, the magazine Theater heute voted her Young Actress of the Year. From 1991 to 1998 she had her second permanent engagement at the Deutsches Schauspielhaus in Hamburg. Since 1998 she has been working as a freelance actress, her path leading her to the Schauspielhaus Zurich and the Burgtheater in Vienna. She had great success at the Schaubühne am Lehniner Platz in Berlin as "Sonja" in Uncle Vanya, directed by Andrea Breth. She also appeared at the Deutsches Theater in Berlin as "Karoline" in Kasimir und Karoline by Ödön von Horváth, directed by Andreas Dresen.

== Selected filmography ==
Year	Title	Role	Notes
2005	Summer in Berlin		
2006	Cold Summer	Katharina Kuhlke	TV film
2007	Kuckuckszeit	Claudia	TV film
2008	A Year Ago in Winter		
2010	Single by Contract		
2011	The Tuesday Ladies	Judith	TV film
2013	Global Player	Marlies Bogenschütz	
2015	Unterm Radar		
2016	Center of My World	Teresa	
