= Jakob M. Erwa =

Austrian director, screenwriter and film producer (born 1981)

Jakob Moritz Erwa
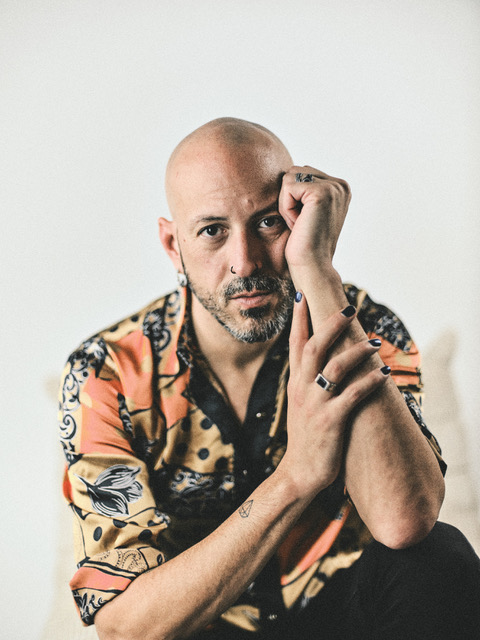
- Jakob M. Erwa in 2024
- Born: July 17, 1981 (age 44); Graz, Steiermark, Austria
- Occupation(s): Director, screenwriter, film producer
- Years active: 2000–present

Jakob Moritz Erwa (born July 17, 1981, in Graz, Steiermark) is an Austrian director, screenwriter, and film producer.

== Life ==
After receiving his high school diploma at technical institution of higher education for art and design in Graz in June 2000, Erwa worked for several film production companies in Austria. At the age of nineteen, he wrote his first screenplay One by One – Eine Teenietragödie. 2001 he produced his first short movie Trübe Aussichten and started his studies at the University of Television and Film Munich, which he completed in February 2007.

In 2003, Erwa founded the film production company mojo:pictures with the actor Rachel Honegger in Munich. In 2007, he produced together with Novotny & Novotny Filmproduktion his critically acclaimed graduation movie Heile Welt. The movie received the Diagonale award for the best Austrian feature film in 2006/07 and the German Independence Award at the Oldenburg International Film Festival for the best German movie. Furthermore, the movie took part in many competitions at international film festivals.

For ORF, Erwa worked from 2007 until 2009 on tschuschen:power, a teenager series about migrants in second and third generation in Vienna. With his second feature movie, Homesick Erwa was invited to the Berlinale in 2015, where the movie's premiere took place. His movie adaption Center of My World, which is based on the young-adult book The Center of the World by Andreas Steinhöfel, is set to be released in November 2016 in Germany.

Erwa lives in Berlin and is a member of BVR - Bundesverband Regie and of the Akademie des Österreichischen Films.

== Filmography ==
Year	Title	Notes
2003	Little Prince (Märchenprinz)	Short movie
2004	Lies and Letters (Wie Schnee hinter Glas)	Short movie
2005	Nine (Neun)	Episodic movie
2007	All the Invisible Things (Heile Welt)	
2007-2009	tschuschen:power	TV mini-series
2015	Homesick	
2016	Center of My World (Die Mitte der Welt) This production received a 100% critics rating on Rotten Tomatoes and met with general acclaim.	

== Music videos ==
- 2004: Shiver - Stehst du still (P: mojo:pictures | L: EMI Austria)
- 2006: Farbe 5 - Traumfrau (P: mojo:pictures | L: GTM)
- 2007: Jerx feat. Emkay1 - FICK DIE WELT (L: ToXroX/Universal Music)
- 2009: Jerx - Pleased To Meet You (L: maintheme/Universal Music)
- 2010: Jerx - Money (L: maintheme/ToXRoX/Universal Music)

== Awards ==
Homesick:

- 2016: Best Picture - Eye On Films Competition, Kolobrzeg International Suspense Film Festival 2016
- 2015: Special award of the jury for Esther Maria Pietsch for her portrayal in Homesick at the Baltic Debuts Film Festival 2015
- 2015: Nomination: DFJW-Preis Dialogue en perspective, Berlinale
- 2015: Nomination: Made in Germany – Förderpreis Perspektive, Berlinale
- 2015: Nomination: Best feature film, Neuchâtel International Fantasy Film Festival

Heile Welt:

- 2007: Diagonale award – Best Austrian feature film 2006/07
- 2007: Oldenburg International Film Festival: German Independence Award – Best German movie 2007
- 2007: 2 Nominierungen Best feature-length graduate film und Actor award (Simon Möstl) First Steps Award 2007
- 2007: 2 nominations Best movie debutant Undine Award (A. Schneider, M. Sauseng)
- 2008: Nomination Best Screenplay Studio Hamburg Nachwuchspreis 2008

Wie Schnee hinter Glas:

- 2006: Bester österreichischer Kurzfilm 2006 (Cosi Fan Tutte Vienna Short Film Festival)
- 2005: Cine Styria Jugendfilmpreis des Landes Steiermark
- 2005: Starter Filmpreis der Landeshauptstadt München

For his music videos, including those for Shiver and Jerx, Erwa has been awarded multiple times.
