= Nina Proll =

Austrian actress (born 1974)

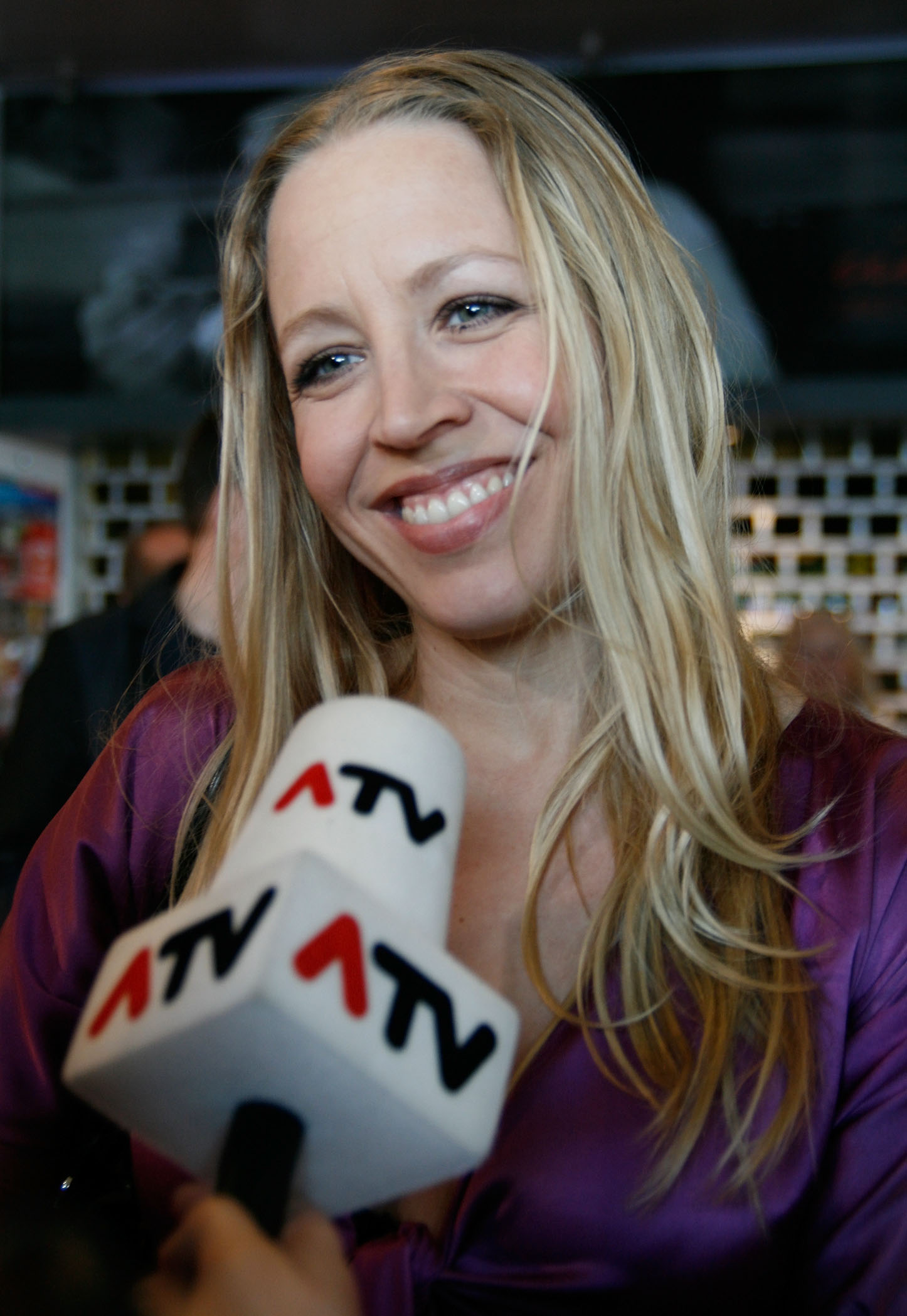
- Nina Proll in 2010
- Born: 12 January 1974 (age 52); Vienna, Austria
- Occupation: Actress
- Years active: 1995–present

Nina Proll (born 12 January 1974) is an Austrian actress. She has appeared in more than 50 films and television shows since 1995. She starred in the film September, which was screened in the Un Certain Regard section at the 2003 Cannes Film Festival.

In 1999 she received the Marcello Mastroianni Award given out at the Venice International Film Festival. Proll participated in the third season of the Austrian television dance competition Dancing Stars in 2007, coming in 5th place.

== Filmography ==
Year	Title	Role	Notes
1995	Auf Teufel komm raus		
1998	Hinterholz 8	Margit Krcal	
1998	Slidin' - Alles bunt und wunderbar		
1998	Suzie Washington	Stewardess	
1999	Northern Skirts	Jasmin Schmid	
2000	Die Fremde		
2000	Ternitz, Tennessee	Lilly	
2000	Komm, süßer Tod	Angelika Lanz	
2002	Amen.	Helga	
2002	Ikarus	Lena	
2002	On the Other Side of the Bridge	Fanny	
2003	September	Lena	
2005	Antibodies	Lucy	
2005	Die Quereinsteigerinnen	Barbara	
2006	Fallen	Nina	
2007	Rabbit Without Ears	Daniela Berg	
2008	The Sibyl Cipher	Petra Wendt	
2008	Buddenbrooks	Aline Puvogel	
2010	Tiger Team: The Mountain of the 1000 Dragons	Frau Papus	
2010	Anatomy of Evil (Episode 1)	Vera Angerer	
2012	Was weg is, is weg	Gini Much	
2013	Talea	Eva	
2013	Dampfnudelblues	Sophie Höpfl	
2013	Lovely Louise	Steffi	
2015	Traumfrauen	Birte Schottenhammel	
2015	Look Who's Back	Ute Kassler	Uncredited
2016	Centre of My World	Pascal	
2016	Egon Schiele: Death and the Maiden	Varieteédirektorin / Vaudeville director	
2017	Anna Fucking Molnar	Anna Molnar	
2023	Doppelhaushälfte		
