= Bromance (2016 film) =

2016 Argentine film

- Poster
- Spanish: Como una novia sin sexo
- Directed by: Lucas Santa Ana
- Written by: Lucas Santa Ana; Diego Mina
- Produced by: Alberto Masliah
- Starring: Javier De Pietro; Agustín Pardella; Marcos Ribas; Luana Pascua
- Cinematography: Mariana Russo
- Edited by: Marcela Truglio
- Music by: Coiffeur
- Release date: 10 November 2016
- Running time: 93 minutes
- Country: Argentina
- Language: Spanish

Bromance (Spanish: Como una novia sin sexo, lit. 'Like a girlfriend without sex') is a 2016 Argentine romantic comedy film directed by Lucas Santa Ana.

== Plot ==
In 1996, three young men spend their holidays on a beach; a ghost of homosexuality looms, haunting masculinity. A girl serves as a catalyst for all this tension.

== Cast ==
- Javier De Pietro
- Agustín Pardella
- Marcos Ribas
- Luana Pascua

== Accolades ==
Year	Award	Category	Nominee(s)	Result	Ref.
2017	Silver Condor Awards	Best New Actor	Agustín Pardella	Nominated	
2017	Silver Condor Awards	Best Original Soundtrack	Coiffeur	Nominated	
