= Sabine Timoteo =

Swiss actress (born 1975)

- Born: 25 March 1975 (age 51); Bern, Switzerland
- Occupation: Actress
- Years active: 2000-present

Sabine Timoteo (born 25 March 1975) is a Swiss actress from the Lorraine district of Bern. She has appeared in more than thirty films since 2000.

== Early life ==
Timoteo grew up dividing time between the United States and Lausanne, Switzerland. As a trained ballet dancer, she won the Prix de Lausanne at 17 years of age.

== Career ==
Prior to acting, Timoteo was an award-winning dancer. She gave up dancing after it began to negatively affect her body.

She spent three months in the Japanese Zen monastery Antaiji for the film Zen for Nothing.

== Selected filmography ==
Year	Title	Role	Notes
2000	Love, Money, Love	Marie	
2001	The Days Between	Lynn	
2002	Friends of Friends	Billie	TV film
2005	Ghosts	Toni	
2006	A Friend of Mine	Stelle	
2006	The Free Will	Netti Engelbrecht	
2007	After Effect	Rena Yazka	
2010	Brownian Movement	Psychiatrist	
2011	Color of the Ocean	Nathalie	
2012	Formentera	Nina	
2014	Futuro Beach	Heiko's wife	
2014	The Wonders	Coco	
2015	Usfahrt Oerlike	Ronja	
2016	The Chronicles of Melanie	Melanie	Latvian film
2016	7 Minutes	Micaela	
2016	Zen for Nothing		
2016	Center of my World	Glass	
2017	Sicilian Ghost Story	Luna's mother	
2017	Sarah Plays a Werewolf	Frau Schroeter	
2019	The Collini Case	Weapon expert	
2021	The Girl and the Spider	Karen	
2024	Meanwhile on Earth	Sidonie	
2024	Transamazonia	Denise	
