= Andreas Steinhöfel =

German author of children and young adult books (born 1962)

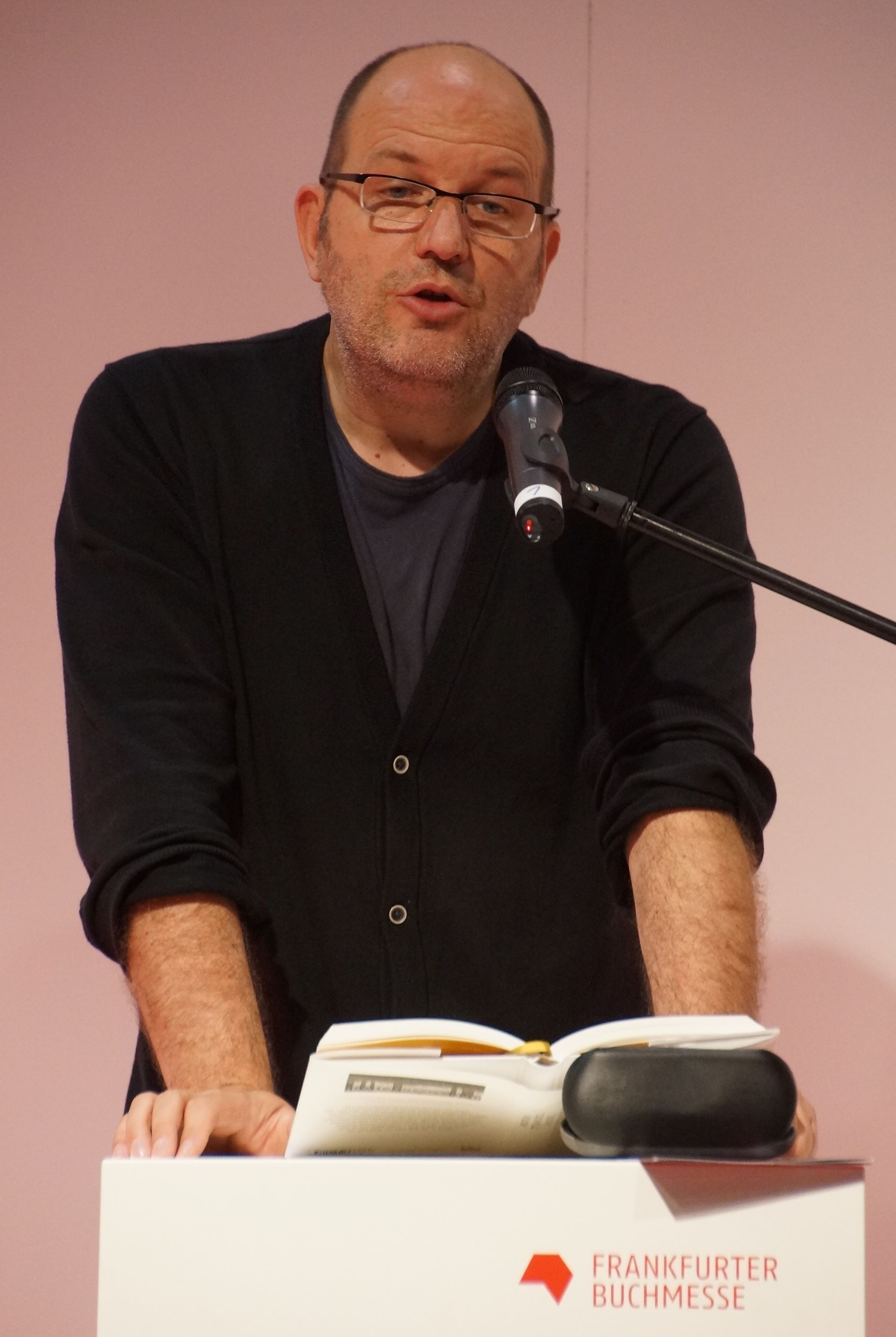
- Born: 14 January 1962 (age 64); Battenberg, Hesse

Andreas Steinhöfel (German: [anˈdʁeːas ˈʃtaɪnˌhøːfl̩]; born 14 January 1962) is a German author for children and young adult books, and a translator.

== Biography ==
Andreas Steinhöfel grew up with two brothers in the Middle Hesse small town Biedenkopf, and did his A Levels there. At first he began to study Biology and English in lectureship, but then decided to study English studies, Amerikanistik and media studies at the University of Marburg. After his graduation in 1991, his first book Dirk und ich was released.

One of his most famous books is Paul Vier und die Schröders (1992), which is now standard reading in German schools. The movie adaptation of the book won the Deutscher Kinderfilmpreis 1995. The novel Die Mitte der Welt is especially popular among teenagers, and was also nominated for the Deutschen Jugendliteraturpreis 1999, as well as the sequel Defender – Geschichten aus der Mitte der Welt. Die Mitte der Welt was translated into English (The Center of the World) by Alisa Jaffa and made into a film of the same name in 2016.

Steinhöfel lives and works in Hesse and was the cohabitee of Gianni Vitiello until his death.

== Content ==
- Dirk und ich (Carlsen Verlag, Hamburg 1991)
- Paul Vier und die Schröders (Carlsen Verlag, Hamburg 1992)
- Trügerische Stille (Alternative title: Glatte Fläche; Carlsen Verlag, Hamburg 1993)
- Glitzerkatze und Stinkmaus (Carlsen Verlag, Hamburg 1994)
- Beschützer der Diebe (Carlsen Verlag, Hamburg 1994)
- Es ist ein Elch entsprungen (Carlsen Verlag, Hamburg 1995)
- 1:0 für Sven und Renan (dtv, München 1995)
- O Patria Mia (Carlsen Verlag, Hamburg 1996)
- Herr Purps, die Klassenmaus (ars edition, München 1996)
- Die Honigkuckuckskinder (dtv, München 1996)
- Die Mitte der Welt (Carlsen Verlag, Hamburg 1998) – in English: The Center of the World
- David Tage, Mona Nächte (with Anja Tuckermann; Carlsen Verlag, Hamburg 1999)
- Wo bist du nur? (Carlsen Verlag, Hamburg 2000)
- Defender – Geschichten aus der Mitte der Welt (Short stories; Carlsen Verlag, Hamburg 2001)
- Der mechanische Prinz (Carlsen Verlag, Hamburg 2003)
- Froschmaul (Kurzgeschichtensammlung; (Carlsen Verlag, Hamburg 2006)
- Rico, Oskar und die Tieferschatten (Carlsen Verlag, Hamburg 2008)
- Rico, Oskar und das Herzgebreche (Carlsen Verlag, Hamburg 2009)
- Rico, Oskar und der Diebstahlstein (Carlsen Verlag, Hamburg 2011)
- nick/her

== Awards ==
- Nomination for the deutschen Jugendliteraturpreis three times (1999, 2002, 2009)
- Zweifacher Erich-Kästner-Stipendiat der Stiftung Preußische Seehandlung, Berlin
- IBBY Honor List (as an author and translator) 1999, 2002, 2009
- Buxtehuder Bulle 1999 (for Die Mitte der Welt)
- Hans-im-Glück-Preis from Limburg 2000 (for David Tage, Mona Nächte)
- Preis der Jury der Jungen Leser (Wien) 2000 (for Die Mitte der Welt)
- Deutscher Jugendliteraturpreis 2005 (for Die Kurzhosengang)
- Corine 2008 (for Rico, Oskar und die Tieferschatten)
- HR-Kinder- und Jugendhörbuch des Jahres 2008 (for Rico, Oskar und die Tieferschatten)
- Erich-Kästner-Preis für Literatur 2009 (for sein Gesamtwerk)
- Katholischer Kinder- und Jugendbuchpreis 2009 (for Rico, Oskar und die Tieferschatten)
- Auszeichnung 'Lesekünstler 2009' durch den Sortimenterausschuss des Börsenvereins Deutscher Buchhandel
- Deutscher Jugendliteraturpreis 2009 (for Rico, Oskar und die Tieferschatten)
- Several minor awards and highscore lists
