= The Freedom to Marry =

Nonfictional motion picture

- Directed by: Eddie Rosenstein
- Produced by: Jenni Olson; Eddie Rosenstein; Amie Segal
- Starring: Evan Wolfson; Mary Bonauto; Marc Solomon
- Cinematography: Claudia Raschke; Bob Richman
- Edited by: Pilar Rico
- Music by: Randy Miller; Keith Kenniff
- Production company: Eyepop Productions
- Distributed by: Argot Pictures
- Release date: April 28, 2016 (Hot Docs)
- Running time: 86 minutes
- Country: USA
- Language: English

The Freedom to Marry is a 2016 documentary directed by Eddie Rosenstein.

== Plot ==
The film chronicles the dramatic fight for marriage equality in the United States, telling an emotional story of the decades of work by lawyers and activists that ultimately led to the nationwide legalization of same-sex marriage.

== Distribution ==
The film premiered at Frameline Film Festival in San Francisco on June 25, 2016. It had a limited theatrical run in the US, distributed by Argot Pictures, and in Europe, distributed by Roco Films. It was available on Netflix. Later, it became available on most of the VOD platforms.

The Freedom to Marry was showcased at film festivals around the world and received numerous awards.

== Cast ==
- Evan Wolfson
- Mary Bonauto
- Marc Solomon
- Dana Nessel
- Brian S. Brown
- April DeBoer
- Jayne Rowse

== Synopsis ==
The Freedom to Marry portrays the efforts of activists and legal professionals in the prolonged campaign for same-sex marriage rights in the United States. The film primarily follows Evan Wolfson, a marriage equality activist and the founder and president of Freedom to Marry organization, and Mary Bonauto, a lawyer with GLAD (Gay & Lesbian Advocates & Defenders) and civil rights advocate. Together, they tackle legal challenges and work to shift public opinion, leading to the Supreme Court's landmark decision in Obergefell v. Hodges on June 26, 2015.

The documentary highlights Wolfson's long-term commitment to the cause. In 1983, he wrote his Harvard Law School thesis on the topic of gay marriage. After achieving success with a gay marriage case in Hawaii in 1993, he established professional ties with Mary Bonauto. Reflecting on the culmination of their efforts, Wolfson remarked, "That only took 32 years."

The film also features the story of April DeBoer and Jane Rowse, both nurses and mothers to four foster children. They were clients of Mary Bonauto and played a significant role in challenging Michigan's ban on same-sex marriage.

== Reception ==
On the website Rotten Tomatoes, 94% of 18 critics' reviews are positive, with an average rating of 6.90/10. On Metacritic, the film's rating is 67/100, based on 6 critics reviews.

=== Accolades ===
Award	Year	Category	Result	Ref.
Frameline40 Film Festival	2016	Documentary feature	Official selection	
Savannah Film Festival	2016	Best documentary feature; Best editing	Won	
North Carolina Gay & Lesbian Film Festival	2016	Best Documentary Feature Film	Won	
Three Rivers Film Festival	2016	Audience Award - Best Documentary	Won	
Doc NYC	2016	Documentary Feature	Official selection	
Atlanta Jewish Film Festival	2017	Audience Award - Best Documentary	Won	
Philadelphia Jewish Film Festival	2016	Audience Award for Best Documentary	Won	
Sebastopol Documentary Film Festival	2017	Audience Award for Best Documentary	Won	

== See also ==
- Freedom to Marry (Organization)
- The Case Against 8
- Mary Bonauto
- Obergefell v. Hodges
