= Khalfan Belhoul =

Emirati business leader

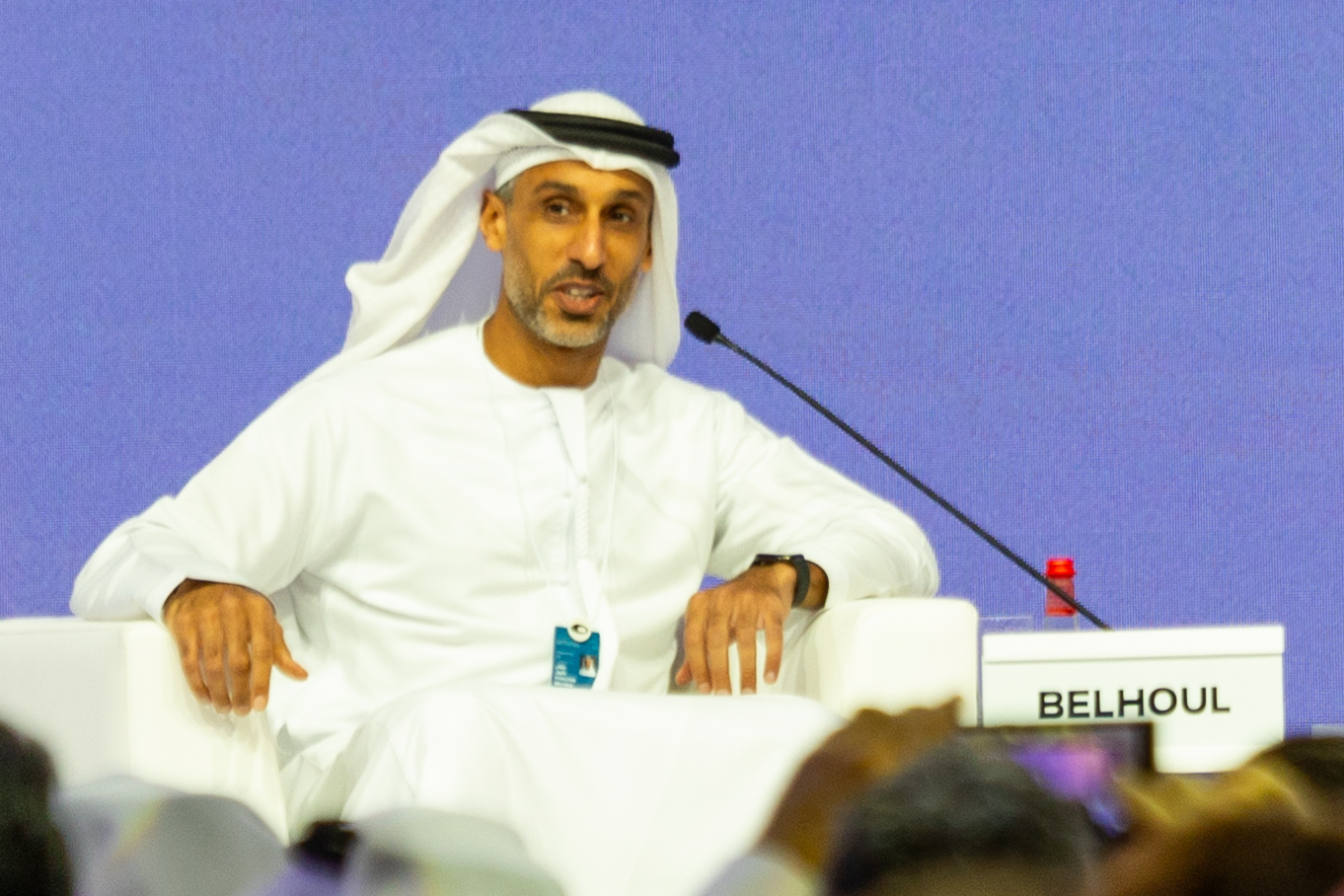
- Belhoul at the Dubai Future Forum in 2024
- Education: Boston University (BS, MS)
- Occupation: Business executive
- Employer: Dubai Future Foundation
- Title: Chief Executive Officer, Dubai Future Foundation

Khalfan Belhoul is an Emirati business leader and the chief executive officer (CEO) of the Dubai Future Foundation.

== Education ==
Belhoul holds a Bachelor of Science in Finance and Management Information Systems and a master's degree in E-commerce, both from Boston University.

Before his leadership at the Foundation, Belhoul served as Vice President of Strategy at Dubai Holding, where he led the organization's role in diversifying Dubai’s non-oil economy. Earlier in his career, he led the setup of the Belhoul Investment Office.
