= The Barstow School =

Prep school in Kansas City, Missouri, US

Location
- 11511 State Line Road; Kansas City, Missouri; United States; 38.9182°N 94.6048°W

Information
- Type: Independent
- Motto: "To promote sound scholarship, and to give symmetrical development to mind, body and character."
- Established: 1884 (girls only), 1967 (Coed Educational)
- CEEB code: 261-605
- President and Head of School: Arthur Hall
- Faculty: 110 total
- Enrollment: Approx. 750
- Student to teacher ratio: 9.5:1
- Campus: Suburban
- Campus size: 40 Acres
- Colors: Green, black, white
- Song: Standards High
- Athletics: 19 interscholastic, numerous club
- Athletics conference: Crossroads Conference (XRC)
- Mascot: Knights
- Tuition: $17,165 - $25,530
- Website: barstowschool.org

The Barstow School, previously called Miss Barstow’s School 1884 known as oldest independent school west of the Mississippi, is a secular, coeducational, independent preparatory school in Kansas City, Missouri, USA. It was co-founded in 1884 by Mary Louise Barstow and Ada Brann.

The Barstow School enrolls 750 students from preschool through grade 12.

== History ==
Mary Louise Barstow and Ada Brann, both graduates of Wellesley College, came to Kansas City in 1884, responding to the need to establish a local school comparable to the outstanding independent schools on the East Coast. With the support of several notable families in the rapidly growing city, they founded the Barstow School at 12th Street and Broadway on Quality Hill in Downtown Kansas City.

As both the school and the city grew and prospered, the school moved several times: first to near Grace and Holy Trinity Cathedral on Quality Hill, then to 40th Street and Westport Avenue, then to 4950 Cherry Street in the Brookside neighborhood, and finally in 1962 to 115th Street and State Line Road, a location then on the far outskirts of the city but today well within Kansas City's suburban sprawl. Although originally coeducational, in 1924 Barstow became an all-girls school except at the preschool level. The school resumed coeducation when it moved to its current location.

In 1960, boys were admitted to the first grade, and Barstow became coeducational one grade and one year at a time, until its first coed graduating class in 1972. Although its class sizes often were under ten, Barstow had two famous alumnae during its early days: movie star Jean Harlow and First Lady Bess Truman.

In 2003, Barstow built a new lower school.

In 2018, Barstow purchased a former Hy-Vee building, opening the Dan and Cassidy Towriss IDEA Space in 2022.

== Athletics ==
The athletic teams are known as the Barstow Knights, and the school colors are green, black and white. Starting with the 2010-2011 school year, the head coach for the Knights basketball team is Billy Thomas.

In the fall, teams are girls' tennis, boys' soccer, girls' volleyball, girls' golf, and girls' and boys' cross-country and boys' swimming. The girls' golf team participated in the state golf tournament in 2010.

Winter sports at Barstow include girls' basketball, boys' basketball, girls' swimming, cheerleading, and the "Knight Starz" dance team. The Knights cheerleading squad has won the class 2 State Cheerleading Competition twice, in 2005 and 2007. The Knight Starz dance team took home a 3rd place finish at the 2009 state dance competition.

In the spring, teams are boys' tennis, boys' baseball, girls' soccer, boys' golf, girls' softball, and boys' and girls' track and field. The boys' baseball team placed second in state in the 2007-2008 season.

In spring 2010, Barstow's Academic Team won the Missouri Class 2 State Championship. All four team members earned All-District Honors and three members earned All-State honors. Also in spring 2010, the varsity girls' soccer team advanced to the Class 1 State Tournament for the first time in school history.

In the spring of 2014, the Barstow boys golf team captured its first Class 2 state title. The team went back to back by winning again in 2015, with three players earning All-State honors. Head coach Joe Taylor was named Missouri Class 2 Golf Coach of the Year both years. In 2016, the team extended its five year run as district champions.

In fall of 2024, the Barstow girls’ tennis team won the Missouri Class 2 State tournament. This comes after their 2021 Class 2 state championship win. Multiple players received All-District and All-State honors in both state runs.

=== Sports ===
For boys, Barstow offers:

Fall	Winter	Spring
Cross Country (6/7/8, V)	Basketball (6, 7/8, JV, V)	Baseball (V)
Soccer (6/7/8, JV, V)	Cheerleading (V)	Golf (V)
Volleyball (6, 7/8)	Dance Team (V)	Tennis (6/7/8, JV, V)
		Track and Field (V)

For girls, Barstow offers:

Fall	Winter	Spring
Cross Country (6/7/8, V)	Basketball (6/7/8, JV, V)	Soccer (6/7/8, V)
Golf (V)	Swimming (V)	Track and Field (V)
Tennis (6/7/8, JV, V)	Cheerleading (V)	
Volleyball (6, 7/8/, JV, V)	Dance Team (V)	

== Notable alumni ==
- Eldar Djangirov, jazz pianist
- Josh Earnest, White House Press Secretary for the Obama Administration, 2014
- Jacob Gilyard, basketball player for the Cleveland Charge
- Jean Harlow, film actress and top sex symbol of the 1930s, known as the Platinum Blonde
- Jessica Krug, American historian, author, and activist
- Brian Loftin, former Major League Soccer Player for the Tampa Bay Mutiny and former commissioner of the Xtreme Soccer League.
- Quinton Lucas, University of Kansas law professor who was elected Mayor of Kansas City in 2019.
- Michael MacCambridge, author, journalist, TV commentator, and editorial coordinator of the Chiefs’ Hall of Honor.
- Jamie Metzl, politician and national security expert
- Lucian Piane, musician, composer
- Margot Peet, artist
- Marc Solomon, gay rights activist, national director of Freedom to Marry, and author
- Bess Truman, wife of Harry S Truman and First Lady of the United States from 1945 to 1953.
- Nick Wright, sports personality
