= Evan Wolfson =

American gay rights advocate (born 1957)

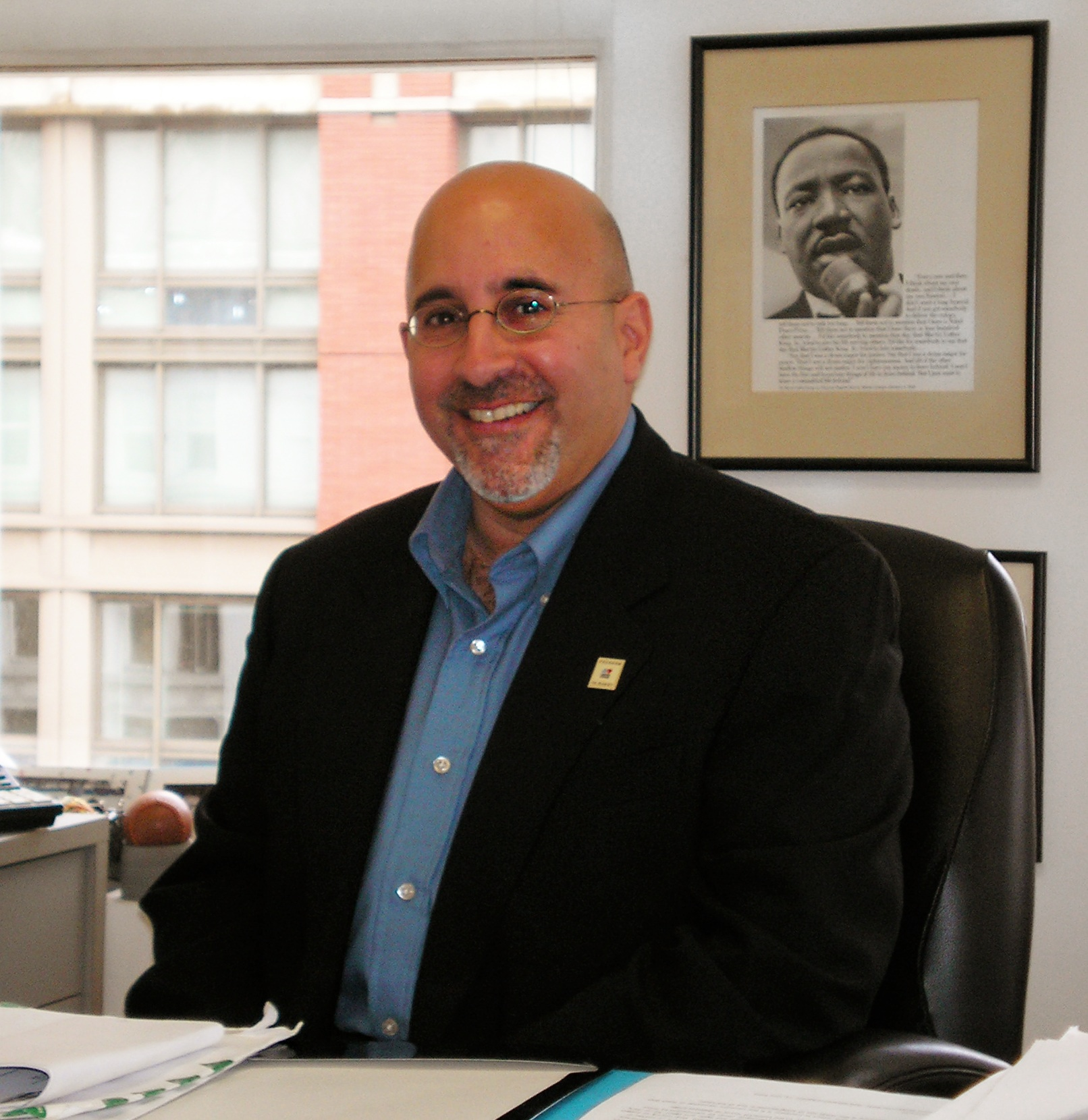
- Wolfson in 2006
- Born: February 4, 1957 (age 69); New York City, US
- Occupation: Attorney

Evan Wolfson (born February 4, 1957) is an American attorney and gay rights advocate. He is the founder of Freedom to Marry, a group favoring same-sex marriage in the United States, serving as president until its 2015 victory and subsequent wind-down. Wolfson authored the book Why Marriage Matters: America, Equality, and Gay People's Right to Marry, which Time Out New York magazine called, "Perhaps the most important gay-marriage primer ever written". He was listed as one of Time magazine's 100 most influential people in the world. In 2025, he was awarded the Presidential Citizens Medal, one of the highest civilian honors in the United States.

He has taught as an adjunct professor at Columbia Law School, Rutgers Law School, and Whittier Law School and argued before the Supreme Court in Boy Scouts of America v. Dale. He now teaches law and social change at Georgetown Law School and at Yale University; serves as a senior counsel at Dentons, the world's largest law firm; and primarily provides advice and assistance to other organizations and causes, in the United States and globally, that are seeking to adapt the lessons on "how to win" from the same-sex marriage movement.

== Early life ==
Wolfson was born to a Jewish family in Brooklyn, New York, and grew up in Pittsburgh . He graduated from Taylor Allderdice High School in 1974 and Yale College in 1978. At Yale, he was a resident of Silliman College, a history major, and speaker of the Yale Political Union. After graduation, he served in the Peace Corps in Togo, in western Africa. He returned and entered Harvard Law School, where he earned his Juris Doctor in 1983. Wolfson wrote his 1983 Harvard Law thesis on same-sex marriage, long before the question gained national prominence. On October 6, 2010, he returned to the Yale Political Union to debate same-sex marriage against opponent Maggie Gallagher, chairman of the National Organization for Marriage.

== Early career ==
While in law school, Wolfson was a teaching-fellow in political philosophy at Harvard College before he returned to his birthplace as Kings County (Brooklyn) assistant district attorney, prosecuting sex crimes and homicides, as well as serving in the Appeals Bureau. There, he wrote a Supreme Court amicus brief that helped win a nationwide ban on race discrimination in jury selection (Batson v. Kentucky). Wolfson also wrote a brief to New York's highest court, the Court of Appeals, that helped win the elimination of the marital rape exemption (People v. Liberta).

Following the District Attorney's Office, Wolfson served as associate counsel to Lawrence Walsh in the Office of Independent Counsel (Iran/Contra). In 1992, he served on the New York State Task Force on Sexual Harassment.

== Lambda Legal Defense and Education Fund ==
From 1989 until 2001, Wolfson worked full-time at Lambda Legal Defense and Education Fund, a gay rights advocacy non-profit, handling cases on a range of matters, from partnership and custody, to military discrimination, to HIV/AIDS, to employment discrimination, to challenges to so-called "sodomy" laws. Wolfson directed their Marriage Project and coordinated the National Freedom to Marry Coalition, a forerunner to Freedom to Marry. Wolfson served as co-counsel alongside Hawaii attorney Dan Foley and co-wrote an amicus brief in Baehr v. Miike, in which the Supreme Court of Hawaii said prohibiting same-sex marriage in the state constituted discrimination. Wolfson and Foley then conducted a trial before Hawaii judge Kevin Chang, which on December 3, 1996, resulted in the world's first-ever ruling in favor of the freedom to marry. Wolfson also worked on Baker v. Vermont, the Vermont Supreme Court case that led to the creation of civil unions in Vermont by the state legislature as a "compromise" between same-sex marriage advocates and those objecting to same-sex marriage. Wolfson called the unions a "wonderful step forward", but not enough.

Wolfson appeared before the United States Supreme Court on April 26, 2000, to argue on behalf of Scoutmaster James Dale in the landmark case Boy Scouts of America v. Dale, in which the court ruled that the Boy Scouts organization had the right to expel Dale for revealing that he was gay through their First Amendment rights. The justices questioned Wolfson "aggressively". The court ruled 5–4 against Dale, but Wolfson said, "Even before we change the [Boy Scout] policy, we are succeeding in getting people to rethink how they feel about gay people." He summed it up, "We may have lost the case, but we are winning the cause"; the disagreement with the policy and awakened activism by Scout members and supporters led the Boy Scouts to change their policy in 2013. Dale said of Wolfson: "Evan understood the importance of the organization to me, and the importance of an American institution like the Boy Scouts discriminating against somebody and how that could impact the public dialogue and conversation."

== Freedom to Marry ==
On April 30, 2001, Wolfson left Lambda to form Freedom to Marry, having secured a "very generous" grant from the Evelyn and Walter Haas Jr. Fund. Wolfson described the breadth of his vision for the new organization: "I'm not in this just to change the law. It's about changing society. I want gay kids to grow up believing that they can get married, that they can join the Scouts, that they can choose the life they want to live." Lambda executive director Kevin Cathcart said that over twelve years Wolfson had "personified Lambda's passion and vision for equality". Kate Kendell, executive director of the National Center for Lesbian Rights, said of her experience with Wolfson at Lambda: "What I can now say is that, in the intervening years, what has been made unmistakably clear to me by the lesbians and gay men that we work with and represent, is that the denial of our right to marry exacerbates our marginalization; winning that right is the cornerstone of full justice."

In 2003, Time magazine described him as symbolic of the gay rights movement. In his book Why Marriage Matters, Wolfson calls marriage "a relationship of emotional and financial interdependence between two people who make a public commitment." In 2004 Time included Wolfson on its list of the "100 most influential people in the world".

In 2004, the first year of same-sex marriage in Massachusetts, opponents placed constitutional amendments prohibiting same-sex marriage on the ballot in 13 states, and all of them passed. Following the losses, Wolfson helped organize more than a dozen LGBTQ leaders to recommit to the fight, rearticulate the strategy, and renew the call for an expanded national campaign. The outcome of many discussions was a concept paper, drafted chiefly by the ACLU's Matt Coles together with Wolfson, "Winning Marriage: What We Need to Do". The concept paper, which became known as the "10-10-10-20" or "2020 Vision" paper (referencing the group's aim to win marriage by 2020), was signed by every major LGBT group.

After the passage of Proposition 8 in California, Wolfson worked with funders and movement partners to increase the capacity for Freedom to Marry as the central campaign to drive the national strategy and create the climate in which litigation could succeed, bringing on National Campaign Director Marc Solomon, messaging expert Thalia Zepatos, digital experts like Michael Crawford, Cameron Tolle, and Adam Polaski, and opening a federal office in Washington, D.C. Between 2010 and 2014, Wolfson's newly expanded Freedom to Marry team – which dramatically increased its budget to more than $13 million and grew to a roster of more than 30 – led marriage work in almost every state, working with partners across legislative, ballot, and litigation efforts. Wolfson also urged President Barack Obama to publicly support same-sex marriage, which he did in 2012. The Freedom to Marry team's efforts also led to the Democratic Party adding support for same-sex marriage to its official party platform in 2012. In the 2012 election, four states voted in favor of same-sex marriage at the ballot, the first-ever electoral victories for supporters of same-sex marriage.

Molly Ball wrote in a post-election piece in The Atlantic, "When it came to the ballot box, just as gay-marriage opponents were convinced they couldn't lose, some proponents had become convinced they were jinxed. Evan Wolfson refused to believe that. Against all evidence to the contrary, he thought his side could win."

In 2013, the U.S. Supreme Court ruled against the Defense of Marriage Act, and in the months that followed many federal judges ruled against state constitutional amendments prohibiting same-sex marriage. Several of these cases reached the U.S. Supreme Court, which ruled on June 26, 2015, in Obergefell v. Hodges that same-sex couples nationwide have the right to marry. Frank Bruni wrote in The New York Times after the victory, "Nothing about [the marriage fight] feels quick if you consider that Evan Wolfson, a chief architect of the political quest for same-sex marriage, wrote a thesis on the topic at Harvard Law School in 1983."

Some critics such as BeyondMarriage.org assert Wolfson and others' work is too narrowly focused on a limited marriage agenda. Richard Kim, signatory and founding board member of Queers for Economic Justice, disputes Wolfson's assertion that the same-sex movement is not pushing for a traditional, heterosexual model for all gays and lesbians and creating a political schism, and as such, gravely misrepresents the consequences of their own work for the past 20 years." Wolfson replied "I think if Terrence McNally, Steinem and the others were actually shown some of Richard Kim's articles as opposed to the broad, conciliatory and coalition-building goals found in that statement, they would not endorse his articles nor his views." In a New York Times review of Why Marriage Matters, author William Saletan states what he sees as flaws in Wolfson's reasoning. "[His] abstract theory of equality flattens ... distinction. ... Thus he demands protection of committed gay couples not because they resemble heterosexual couples in all relevant respects but because it's wrong to discriminate against people because of their 'differences'." Wolfson does not favor the civil union or domestic partnership approaches, because semantic differences create "a stigma of exclusion" and deny gay couples "social and other advantages".

== Following Freedom to Marry ==
In February 2016, its goal achieved, Freedom to Marry officially closed. After the closure of the organization, Wolfson devoted his time to advising and assisting other movements and social causes in the United States and around the world, sharing the model and lessons learned from the Freedom to Marry campaign. In 2016, Wolfson was named Distinguished Visitor from Practice at Georgetown Law Center and Distinguished Practitioner in Grand Strategy at Yale, teaching law and social change, and he also serves as senior counsel at Dentons. In 2016, he delivered the commencement address at Northeastern Illinois University and was awarded an honorary Doctorate of Humane Letters. He has given speeches at places such as Judson Memorial Church.

In 2025, Evan was awarded the Presidential Citizens Medal, one of the highest civilian honors in the United States, by President Joe Biden, alongside 19 others, including Mary Bonauto, who also played key leadership roles in winning marriage equality for same-sex couples. The White House's statement announcing the Medal recipients said about Evan: "By leading the marriage equality movement, Evan Wolfson helped millions of people in all 50 states win the fundamental right to love, marry, and be themselves. For 32 years, starting with a visionary law school thesis, Evan Wolfson worked with singular focus and untiring optimism to change not just the law, but society—pioneering a political playbook for change and sharing its lessons, even now, with countless causes worldwide."

== Personal life ==
Wolfson and his husband Cheng He, a change-management consultant with a PhD in molecular biology, reside in New York City. They married in New York on October 15, 2011.

== Selected writings ==
Books

- Why Marriage Matters; America, Equality and Gay People's Right to Marry. New York, NY: Simon & Schuster. July 27, 2004. ISBN 9780743264587.
- "Bayard Rustin", in M. Carnes (ed.), Invisible Giants: Fifty Americans Who Shaped the Nation But Missed the History Books (Oxford University Press: May 2002) ISBN 9780195154177.
- "Movement + Strategy + Campaign: The Freedom to Marry Winning Combination" (with Adam Polaski); chapter in Love Unites Us, The New Press (2014). ISBN 978-1-59558-550-9.

Articles

- "Same-Sex Marriage and Morality: The Human Rights Vision of the Constitution", (Harvard Law School, 1983)
- "Civil Rights, Human Rights, Gay Rights: Minorities and the Humanity of the Different", 14 Harvard Journal of Law and Public Policy 21 (1991)
- "Little Black Book -- Fighting Back: Rest Stop Arrests, Police Abuse, and the Gay and Lesbian Community" (with Rotello, Lambda Legal publication: 1992)
- "When the police are in our bedrooms, shouldn't the courts go in after them?: An update on the fight against 'Sodomy' laws". (with Robert S. Mower); 21 Fordham Urban Law Journal 997 (1994).
- "Crossing the Threshold: Equal Marriage Rights for Lesbians and Gay Men and the Intra-Community Critique", 21 N.Y.U. Review of Law & Social Change 567 (1994).
- "The Supreme Court's Decision in Romer v. Evans and its Implications for the Defense of Marriage Act" (with Michael Melcher), 16 Quinnipiac Law Review 217 (1996).
- "Symposium: The Right to Marry: Making the case to go forward: Introduction: Marriage, Equality and America: Committed Couples, Committed Lives", 13 Widener Law Journal 691 (2004).
- "Marriage Equality and Some Lessons for the Scary Work of Winning", 14 Law & Sexuality 135 (Tulane Law School: 2005), reprinted in C. Logue, L. Messina, & J. DeHart (eds.), Representative American Speeches 2004-2005 (H.W. Wilson Co.: 2005)
- "Where Perry Fits in the National Strategy to Win the Freedom to Marry", 37 N.Y.U. Review of Law & Social Change 123 (2013).
- "Freedom to Marry's Ladder of Clarity: Lessons From A Winning Campaign (That Is Not Yet Won)", 29 Columbia Journal of Gender & Law 236 (March 2015)
- "The Freedom to Marry in Human Rights Law Worldwide: Ending the Exclusion of Same-Sex Couples from Marriage," (with Tueller & Fromkin), 32 Indiana International & Comparative Law Review 1 (April 2022)

Essays and commentary

- "All Together Now". The Advocate. September 11, 2001.
- "Op-Ed: What's Next in the Fight for Gay Equality". The New York Times. June 26, 2015.
- "Lessons for Philanthropy from the Marriage Win". The Chronicle of Philanthropy. June 28, 2015.
- Wolfson, Evan; Frank, Nathaniel (January 16, 2019). "Trump's Shutdown is a Historic Opportunity for Democrats". Slate.
- "Joe Biden Has Met His Moment. America Needs Him Now More Than Ever". LGBTQ Nation. May 4, 2020.
- "Five Years Later, How Obergefell Paved the Way for Bostock and the DACA Decision". Slate. June 24, 2020.
- Wolfson, Evan; Pearce, Russell (August 10, 2020). "Not Just a Bad President, Trump is a 'Holmesian Bad Man.'". ACLU Blog.
- "What I Learned from Joe Biden 45 (Gulp!) Years Ago". The Washington Blade. January 4, 2022.

== Recognition ==
- "Presidential Citizens Medal" (January 2, 2025), President Joe Biden
- "Liberty Award" (2018), Lambda Legal
- "Paula L. Ettelbrick Award" (and Commencement Speaker) (2017), Minority Corporate Counsel Association
- "Honorary Doctorate of Humane Letters" (and Commencement Speaker) (2016), Northeastern Illinois University
- "Stonewall Award" (2016), American Bar Association
- Barnard Medal of Distinction (2012), Barnard College
- "John Fryer Award" (2010), American Psychiatric Association
- "Human Rights Hero" (2009) Human Rights Magazine (American Bar Association)
- Del Martin Phyllis Lyon Marriage Equality Award
- "One of the 100 most influential gay men and women in America." (2008)
- "One of the 100 most influential people in the world." (2004) Time
- "Barry Goldwater National Human Rights Award" (2002), Arizona Human Rights Fund
- "One of the 100 most influential lawyers in America" (2000) The National Law Journal
