= Jordan Nguyen =

Vietnamese-Australian biomedical engineer and inventor

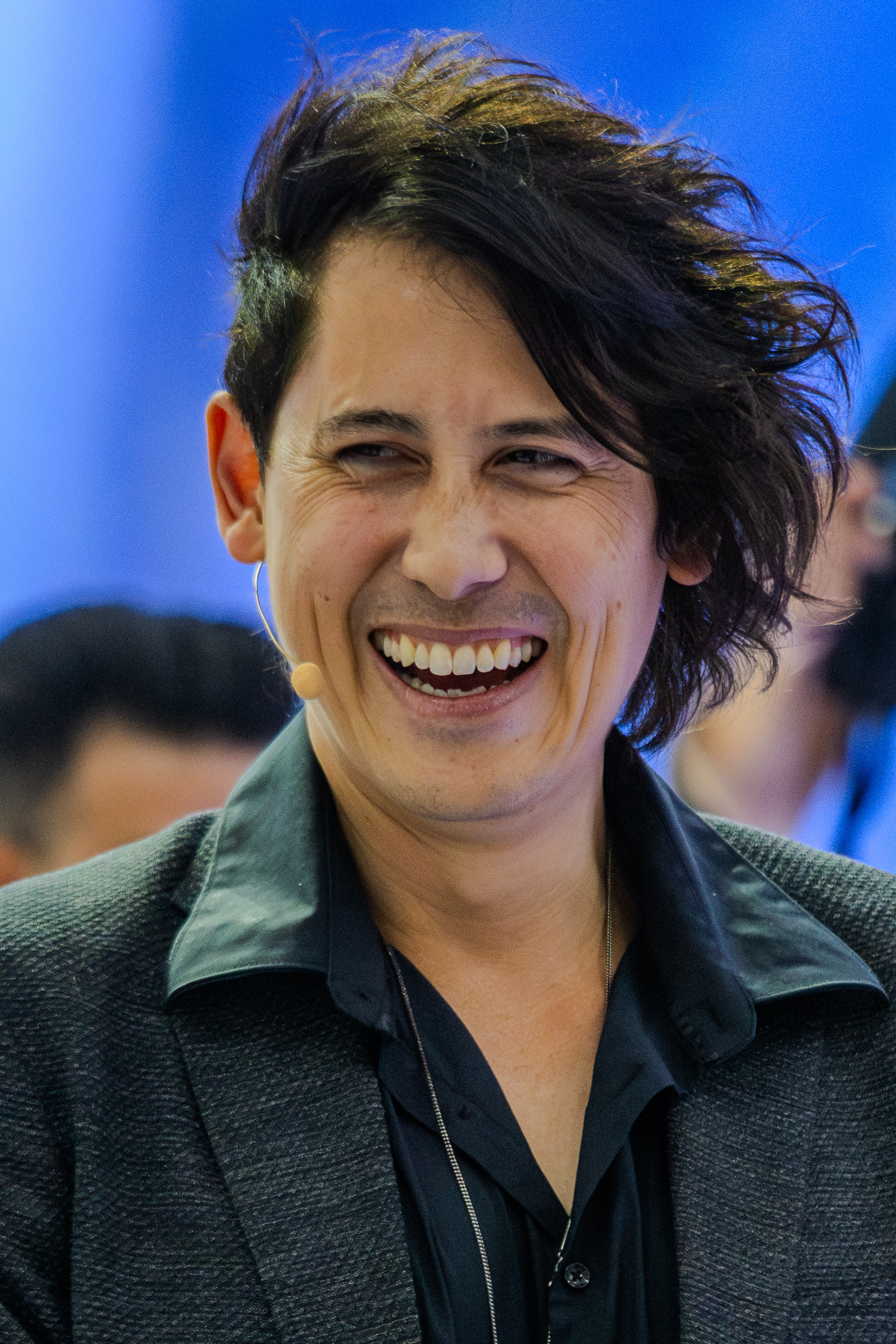
- Nguyen at the Dubai Future Forum (2024)
- Born: Sydney, Australia
- Education: University of Technology Sydney
- Occupation: Biomedical engineer
- Website: www.drjordannguyen.com

Jordan Nguyen is an Australian biomedical engineer and inventor whose achievements include creating a mind-controlled wheelchair, and whose technological innovations are targeted at improving the lives of those living with physical disabilities. He is a Keynote Speaker and futurist, with strong views on using technology for maximum positive global impact. His work has gained considerable media attention across Australia, featuring on ABC's Catalyst and Channel 10's The Project.

== Education ==
Growing up in Sydney, Australia, Jordan Nguyen attended Normanhurst Boys' High School on the Upper North Shore.

He went on to the University of Technology Sydney, where he graduated in 2008 with a Bachelor of Engineering and First Class Honours. In 2012, he completed his PhD in Biomedical Engineering, and was awarded into the UTS Chancellor's List. For his PhD project, Nguyen developed a mind-controlled wheelchair for people with high-level physical disability. The wheelchair used cameras to observe its surroundings and provided navigation assistance to the operator whilst scanning the user's retinas as the means of delivering commands.

== Work ==
Nguyen has spoken at a range of events across Australia, including TEDx events across Sydney, Think Inc., Wired For Wonder, and the international Engineering for Medicine and Biology Conference.

Nguyen has worked as a Software engineer for ResMed, served on the board of directors for Object: Australian Design Centre, and is currently a member of the board for the NSW Medical Technology Knowledge Hub. He has taught project development in Artificial intelligence design, co-founded Remarkable, a technology incubator for disability, and founded Psykinetic, a company aiming to make life-improving technology affordable and accessible.

Nguyen has worked closely with the Cerebral Palsy Alliance and with a range of individuals with Cerebral palsy. In 2016, ABC's Catalyst broadcast a two-part documentary on his work to increase 13-year-old Riley's physical independence in spite of his cerebral palsy.

In 2016, Nguyen was nominated for Australian of the Year and awarded one of Australia's most innovative engineers He is currently working on improving the early diagnosis of disabilities in infants.

== Personal life ==
Nguyen's father is Hung Nguyen, the former Dean of the Faculty of Engineering and Information Technology at UTS and co-director for the Centre of Health Technologies. Nguyen has three younger siblings, a sister and two brothers, who are triplets.

In his third year of university, Nguyen dived into a friend's swimming pool, hit the bottom, and damaged the muscles in his neck. Although he did not break his spine, Nguyen began exploring the options available to quadriplegics. When he discovered how limited they were, he decided to persevere in engineering to help develop technologies for disabilities.
