= Amy Webb =

American futurist and journalist

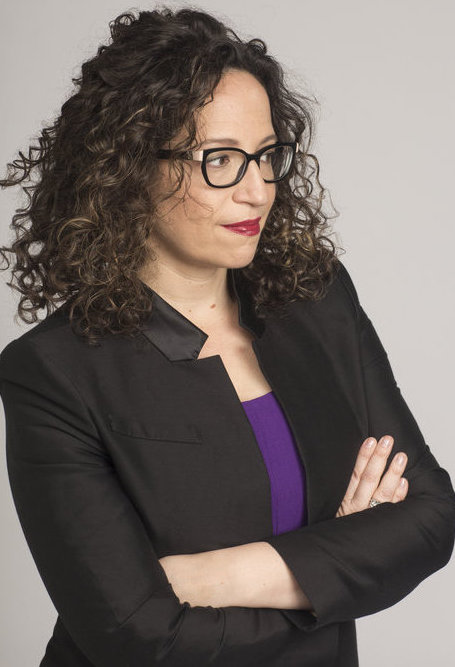
- Born: October 18, 1974 (age 52); East Chicago, Indiana
- Education: Indiana University Bloomington; Columbia University
- Occupations: author, journalist, adjunct professor
- Notable work: Data, A Love Story; The Signals Are Talking; The Big Nine
- Spouse: Brian Woolf (m. 2008)
- Children: 1
- Website: futuretodayinstitute.com

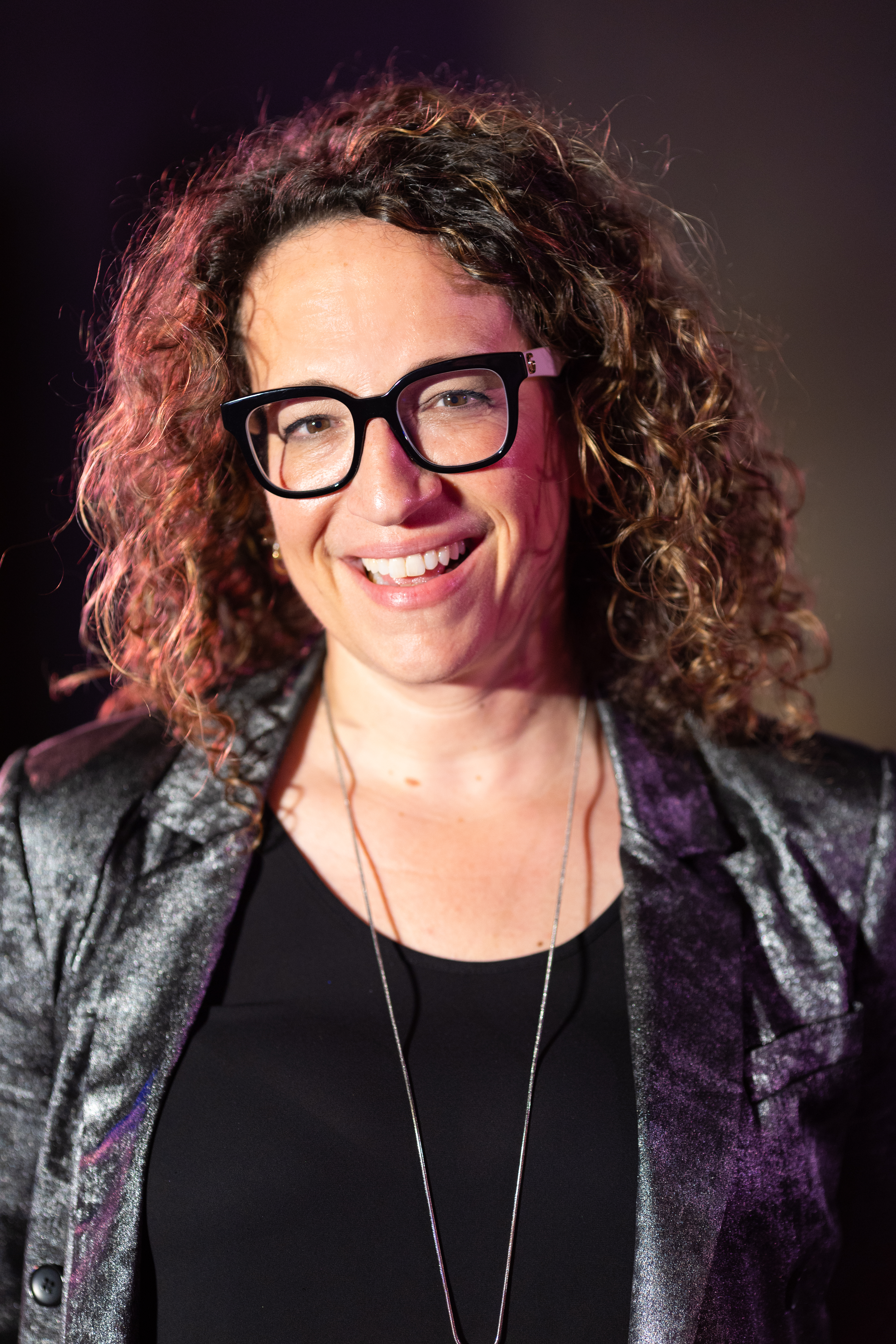
Webb at the Dubai Future Forum (2024)

Amy Lynn Webb (born October 18, 1974) is an American futurist, author and founder and CEO of the Future Today Strategy Group. She is an adjunct assistant professor at New York University's Stern School of Business, a nonresident senior fellow at Atlantic Council, and was a 2014–15 Visiting Nieman Fellow at Harvard University.

== Early life and education ==
Webb was born on 18 October 1974 and raised in East Chicago, Indiana. Originally attending its Jacobs School of Music to study classical clarinet, she earned a bachelor's degree in political science, economics and game theory from Indiana University Bloomington in 1997. She moved to rural Japan, where she worked as a freelance journalist and an English teacher. She earned a master's degree from the Columbia University Graduate School of Journalism in 2001.

== Career ==
Webb started her career as a journalist covering technology and economics. She was a reporter at The Wall Street Journal, and then relocated to Hong Kong to work as a staff reporter with Newsweek, covering emerging technologies. In 2006, Webb founded the Future Today Strategy Group, a management consulting firm. Since 2007, Webb has authored the group's annual Tech Trend Report, an account of the future of technologies and their impact on society. In 2011, she co-founded Spark Camp, a leadership conference focused on the future of business, government and society.

Webb is a visiting fellow at Oxford University's Saïd Business School, a fellow in the US-Japan Leadership Program, and was a delegate on the US-Russia Bilateral Presidential Commission, where she worked on the future of technology, media and international diplomacy. She was a futurist consultant for the 2018 Hulu television series The First, about a human mission to Mars in the 2030s. She was named to the BBC 100 Women list for 2019, the 2017 Thinkers50 Radar list of the 30 people most likely to shape the future of how organizations are managed and led, and won the 2017 Thinkers50 RADAR Award. She has recommended the formation of a Global Alliance on Intelligence Augmentation, a central organization that would develop standards for what should be automated when it comes to data collection and sharing, and to visualize a future with more intelligent systems.

In 2025, Webb along with collaborator Sam Jordan published a report discussing 'Living Intelligence', a conceptual framework based on the premise that artificial intelligence, biotechnology, and advanced sensors are converging to create systems capable of sensing, learning, adapting, and evolving with a range of industrial applications. As examples of this, Webb and Jordan point to DishBrain, a biological computer created by Cortical Labs using brain cells, and the AlphaProteo project from Google DeepMind.

== Books ==
Webb's memoir Data, A Love Story was published by Dutton in 2013. The book chronicles Webb's attempts at online dating. Initially meeting with failure, Webb collected and analyzed data to game online dating. Booklist called the book "clever and inventive", and Publishers Weekly deemed it an "insightful, funny journey through online dating." Webb's 2013 TED Talk about Data, A Love Story has been translated into 32 languages and has been viewed more than 6.7 million times.

In 2015, Harvard University published How To Make J-School Matter (Again), Webb's research on the challenges facing journalism educators and the future of journalism.

Webb's book The Signals Are Talking: Why Today's Fringe Is Tomorrow's Mainstream was published by PublicAffairs on December 6, 2016. In the book she describes her methodology for strategic foresight and examines how weak signals become widely accepted. It was selected as one of Fast Company's Best Business Books of 2016 and as one of Amazon's Best Books of December 2016. It was a The Washington Post bestseller, and has been translated into Japanese, Korean, and Chinese.

Webb's book The Big Nine: How the Tech Titans and Their Thinking Machines Could Warp Humanity was published by PublicAffairs on March 5, 2019. It won the 2020 Gold Axiom Award for Business Technology. In the book, she predicts best- and worst-case scenarios about artificial intelligence (AI) over the next 50 years. She uses the term G-MAFIA, which she coined, to refer to the large American publicly traded technology companies Google, Microsoft, Amazon, Facebook, IBM, and Apple. She says that the G-MAFIA and the Chinese companies Baidu, Alibaba and Tencent (known as the BAT) have the most control over the future of AI, and explains the importance of considering the best interests of humanity when it comes to AI. Excerpts of The Big Nine were published in Wired, Fast Company, Inc., and Business Insider. VentureBeat called the book "an accessible and constructive imagining of what could come next."

== Personal life ==
Webb is Jewish. She lives in New York City and Baltimore, with her husband and their daughter.

== Bibliography ==
- Data, A Love Story: How I Gamed Online Dating to Meet My Match, Dutton, 2013, ISBN 0-142-18045-9.
- How To Make J-School Matter (Again), Nieman, 2015.
- The Signals Are Talking: Why Today's Fringe Is Tomorrow's Mainstream, New York City, PublicAffairs, 2016, ISBN 1-541-78823-0.
- The Big Nine: How the Tech Titans and Their Thinking Machines Could Warp Humanity, New York City, PublicAffairs, 2019, ISBN 978-1541773752.
