= Edward "Eddie" Rosenstein =

American documentary filmmaker and professor

Edward Rosenstein
- Born: Pittsburgh, Pennsylvania
- Education: Pennsylvania State University
- Occupations: Documentary filmmaker, Professor

Edward "Eddie" Rosenstein is an American documentary filmmaker and professor at the New York Film Academy. He has directed and produced documentary films including The Freedom to Marry, Boatlift, School Play, Waging a Living, A Tickle in the Heart and Sandhogs, among others.

== Early life and education ==
Edward Rosenstein was born and raised in Pittsburgh, Pennsylvania. He received his early education from Taylor Allderdice High School. Later, he attended Pennsylvania State University, where he graduated with a bachelor's degree in film and fine arts. He also has an MSW degree from the Silberman School of Social Work at Hunter College. He lives with his wife and two sons in Brooklyn, New York.

== Career ==
After his college graduation, Rosenstein moved to New York City to pursue a career in the film industry. He began as a production assistant and by his mid-20s, Rosenstein was producing both commercials and films with budgets in the millions of dollars. His debut feature documentary film, A Tickle in the Heart, which he co-produced, had its premiere at the Berlin Film Festival and was subsequently released internationally in 1996.

Rosenstein's work often draws from his personal life experiences. His short film, Miss Shade is Missing, was inspired by an incident involving his son's third-grade class in Brooklyn, New York, where Rosenstein currently resides with his wife and two children. The film showcases the candid nature of children and includes a memorable quote from Rosenstein's son about his classmates' immaturity.

In 1999, Rosenstein worked on Two Weddings, which explores themes of survival and reunion through the story of a couple attending their grandson's wedding while reflecting on their own reconnection after being separated in different concentration camps during World War II.

In 2008, Rosenstein began working on Sandhogs, a feature-length documentary and subsequent non-fiction television series about the urban miners building new water tunnels and subway tunnels under New York City. He aimed to gain insight into the lives and challenges of the sandhogs by working alongside them. After initial difficulties gaining access, he got a position on one of the gangs, replacing an injured worker. Rosenstein spent months working with the sandhogs to gain their trust, becoming a union miner and even obtaining an explosive handling license before introducing a camera to document their experiences and the importance of sandhogs' work.

In 2011, Rosenstein directed the documentary short film Boatlift, narrated by Tom Hanks, which chronicles the sea evacuation of over 500,000 people from Manhattan on 9/11.

In 2016, Rosenstein directed The Freedom to Marry. The film premiered at Frameline Film Festival, Maine Jewish Film Festival, Seoul Pride Festival, and won prizes at festivals including Savannah Film Festival, Three Rivers Film Festival and Sebastopol Documentary Film Festival.

Rosenstein's work as an immersive documentary filmmaker served as inspiration for the character Mark Cohen in the musical RENT, written by Jonathan Larson, who was one of Rosenstein's close friends.

During his career, Rosenstein has worked on documentaries, reality television, and children's programming for networks such as AMC, A&E, HBO, Nickelodeon, and PBS Kids. He is the founder of Eyepop Productions.

Rosenstein is also a faculty member and directing professor at the New York Film Academy.

== Boatlift ==
The documentary short film Boatlift, directed by Eddie Rosenstein and narrated by Tom Hanks, tells the story of the spontaneous evacuation of 300,000 to 500,000 people from Manhattan Island by boat on September 11, 2001, following the terrorist attacks on the World Trade Center. The film, produced in commemoration of the 10th anniversary of the attacks, uses firsthand accounts of boat captains and passengers to chronicle the events of the largest maritime evacuation in U.S. history. Boatlift highlights the heroic efforts of the captains and crews of approximately 150 vessels, including ferries, tugboats, merchant ships, private boats, and New York City Fire Department and Police Department boats, who responded to the call to evacuate stranded individuals from Lower Manhattan, with the U.S. Coast Guard coordinating the rescue operation.

== Filmography ==
- A Tickle in the Heart (1996)
- Two Weddings (1999)
- The Gospel According to Mr. Allen (2000)
- The AMC Project: Reality People (2003)
- P.O.V, Waging a Living (2006)
- Lonely Hearts (2006)
- Sandhogs (2008)
- The Greatest Tunnel Ever Built (2008)
- School Play (2008)
- Miss Shade is Missing (2010)
- Boatlift (2011)
- Rebuild (2011)
- The Freedom to Marry (2016)
- Vanity Fair Confidential (2018)
