= Taylor Allderdice High School =

Public high school in Pittsburgh, U.S.

Location
- 2409 Shady Avenue; Pittsburgh, Pennsylvania 15217; United States; 40°25′46″N 79°55′10″W

Information
- Type: Public high school
- Motto: Know Something, Do Something, Be Something
- Established: 1927
- School district: Pittsburgh Public Schools
- NCES School ID: 421917000409
- Principal: Danielle Michalski
- Teaching staff: 95.50 (FTE)
- Grades: 9–12
- Enrollment: 1,294 (2023–2024)
- Student to teacher ratio: 13.55
- Colors: Green and white
- Nickname: Dragons/Dice
- Nobel laureates: Joshua Angrist; Frances Arnold
- Website: www.pghschools.org/schools/9-12/allderdice
- Allderdice, Pittsburgh, High School
- U.S. National Register of Historic Places
- Pittsburgh Landmark – PHLF
- Area: 3 acres (1.2 ha)
- Built: 1927
- Architect: Robert Maurice Trimble
- Architectural style: Classical Revival
- MPS: Pittsburgh Public Schools TR
- NRHP reference No.: 86002641

Significant dates
- Added to NRHP: September 30, 1986
- Designated PHLF: 2002

Taylor Allderdice High School is a public high school in the Squirrel Hill neighborhood of Pittsburgh, Pennsylvania. The school was established in 1927 and is part of the Pittsburgh Public Schools district. It was named for industrialist and Squirrel Hill resident Taylor Allderdice, who was a member of the city's first school board and president of National Tube Company, a subsidiary of U.S. Steel.

== Awards and recognition ==
Allderdice was designated a National Blue Ribbon School by the U.S. Department of Education in 1994, 1995, and 1996.

== Notable alumni ==
List of notable alumni of Taylor Allderdice High School
Name	Class year	Notability
Lenny Levy	1932	Coach, Pittsburgh Pirates
Gene Forrell	1933	Composer and conductor
Bernard Fisher	1936	Cancer surgeon and researcher
Alan Perlis	1939	Computer scientist
Marty Allen	1940	Stand-up comedian and actor
Herb Douglas	1940	Bronze medalist, 1948 Summer Olympics
Jerry Fielding	1940	Musician, arranger, bandleader, and film composer
Philip Pearlstein	1942	Painter
Gerald Stern	1942	Poet, essayist, and educator
Burton Miller	1944	Costume and fashion designer who was nominated for the Academy Award for Best Costume Design.
Myron Cope	1947	Sportscaster and announcer, Pittsburgh Steelers, WTAE-TV, and WTAE-AM
Richard Caliguiri	1950	Mayor of Pittsburgh
James S. Langer	1951	Professor of Physics
John Isaiah Brauman	1955	Professor of Chemistry, Stanford University
Murray Chass	1956	Sportswriter
Chuck Wein	1956	Entertainment promoter and manager
Stephen J. Lippard	1958	Professor, Massachusetts Institute of Technology
Edgar Snyder	1959	Attorney, local television personality
Robert Weinberg	1960	Professor and cancer biologist, Massachusetts Institute of Technology
Patti Deutsch	1961	Actress and comedian
Bob O'Connor	1962	Mayor of Pittsburgh
Iris R. Dart	1962	Author and playwright
Jamie deRoy	1963	Stage producer; cabaret, stage, film, and TV performer
Harvey V. Fineberg	1963	President, Institute of Medicine; Provost, Harvard University
Lewis Hyde	1963	Essayist, professor, scholar, translator, writer
Larry Lucchino	1963	President and CEO, Boston Red Sox, Baltimore Orioles and San Diego Padres
Devra Davis	1964	Epidemiologist; writer
David P. Dobkin	1966	Dean of the Faculty and Professor of Computer Science, Princeton University
Howard Fineman	1966	Editorial Director, The Huffington Post Media Group
Richard Pacheco	1966	Pornographic film and video actor, writer and director
Judith Bartnoff	1967	Judge, Superior Court of the District of Columbia
Edward B. Montgomery	1973	Economist, academic, and politician
Frances Arnold	1974	Chemist, Nobel Prize winner
Sally Lapiduss	1974	Television producer and writer
Nathaniel Philbrick	1974	Author
Evan Wolfson	1974	Civil rights attorney
Joseph Koerner	1976	Art historian and professor
Joshua Angrist	1977	Economist, Nobel Prize winner
Paul Costa	1978	Accountant, Pennsylvania State Representative
Gary Graff	1978	Music journalist
Maxine Lapiduss	1978	Comedian; Television producer and writer
Rob Marshall	1978	Theatre director, film director and choreographer
Gary Green	1980	Shortstop, Major League Baseball
Kathleen Marshall	1980	Choreographer and theatre director
Michael J. Tarr	1980	Cognitive neuroscientist
Edward "Eddie" Rosenstein	1981	Documentary filmmaker
Antoine Fuqua	1983	Movie director
Jonathan Rapping	1984	Criminal defense attorney; Founder, Gideon's Promise
Steve Lieber	1985	Comic book illustrator
Edna Campbell	1986	Guard, Women's National Basketball Association
Sharon Epperson	1986	Correspondent, CNBC
James Williams	1986	Offensive tackle, Chicago Bears
Russell Freeman	1987	Offensive Tackle, National Football League
Billy Porter	1987	Broadway performer and pop vocalist
Curtis Martin	1991	Running back, National Football League; Inductee, Pro Football Hall of Fame
Blake Hounshell	1996	Journalist
Michael Solomonov	1996	Chef and restaurateur
Pittsburgh Slim	1997	Rapper
Jayceeoh	2000?	DJ and record producer
Beedie	2006	Rapper
Wiz Khalifa	2006	Rapper
Will Clarke	2009	Defensive end, National Football League
Mac Miller	2010	Rapper and music producer
Scott W. Stern	2011	Author and Norman Holmes Pearson Prize Winner
Tyrique Jarrett	2012	Nose tackle, Denver Broncos

== In popular culture ==
In 2012, rapper Wiz Khalifa released Taylor Allderdice, a mixtape named for his alma mater.
