= Brudner Prize =

Yale University LGBT Studies prize

The James Robert Brudner Memorial Prize and Lecture celebrates lifetime accomplishment and scholarly contributions in the field of LGBT Studies. It is given annually by the Committee for LGBT Studies at Yale University. Recipients receive a cash prize and the opportunity to give a public lecture on the Yale campus in New Haven, Connecticut, as well as a second lecture in New York City.

== Overview ==
The prize is named for James Brudner (1961–1998), a member of the Yale College class of 1983. Brudner died of AIDS-related illness on September 18, 1998. Through his will he established the prize and lecture as "a perpetual annual prize for scholarship in the history, culture, anthropology, biology, etiology, or literature of gay men and lesbians or related fields, or for advancing the understanding of homosexuality as a phenomenon, or the tolerance of gay men and lesbians in society".

Brudner was an AIDS activist, urban planner, journalist, and photographer. He wrote for various publications on gay- and AIDS-related topics. He became a member of ACT UP, the Treatment Action Group, and other organizations after the death of his twin brother, Eric, of AIDS in 1987. He worked on treatment and prevention issues with the National Institutes of Health, pharmaceutical corporations, and federal agencies. In his final years he devoted much of his time to traveling the back roads of rural America with a camera. La Mama Gallery in New York mounted an exhibition of his photographs in 1997. He died of AIDS-related illness on September 18, 1998, at the age of 37.

== Winners ==
- 2019–2020 — Siddhartha Gautam (posthumously), in recognition of his work on behalf of LGBT rights and welfare in India.
- 2018–2019 — Bill T. Jones, choreographer, director, author and dancer
- 2017–2018 — Carolyn Dinshaw, scholar of gender and sexuality in the medieval context
- 2016–2017 — Isaac Julien, artist and film director
- 2015–2016 — Susan Stryker, academic, author, filmmaker
- 2014–2015 — Richard Dyer, film studies scholar
- 2013–2014 — Cherríe Moraga, Chicana writer, feminist activist, poet, essayist, and playwright
- 2012–2013 — Samuel R. Delany, science-fiction author and English literature scholar
- 2011–2012 — David M. Halperin, classicist and English literature scholar
- 2010–2011 — Mary Bonauto, attorney and civil rights advocate
- 2009–2010 — Edwin Cameron, human rights lawyer and justice of South Africa Constitutional Court
- 2008–2009 — Cathy J. Cohen, political scientist
- 2008 — Didier Eribon, philosopher (Eribon returned the prize in 2011: see his letter "I Return the Brudner Prize" on his personal homepage).
- 2007 — B. Ruby Rich, critic
- 2006 — Matthew Coles, Director, American Civil Liberties Union Gay and Lesbian Rights Project
- 2005 — John D'Emilio, historian
- 2004 — Judith Butler, philosopher
- 2003 — Jonathan Ned Katz, historian
- 2002 — Eve Kosofsky Sedgwick, English literature scholar
- 2001 — Lillian Faderman, English literature scholar
- 2000 — George Chauncey, historian
