= Didier Eribon =

French author and philosopher (born 1953)

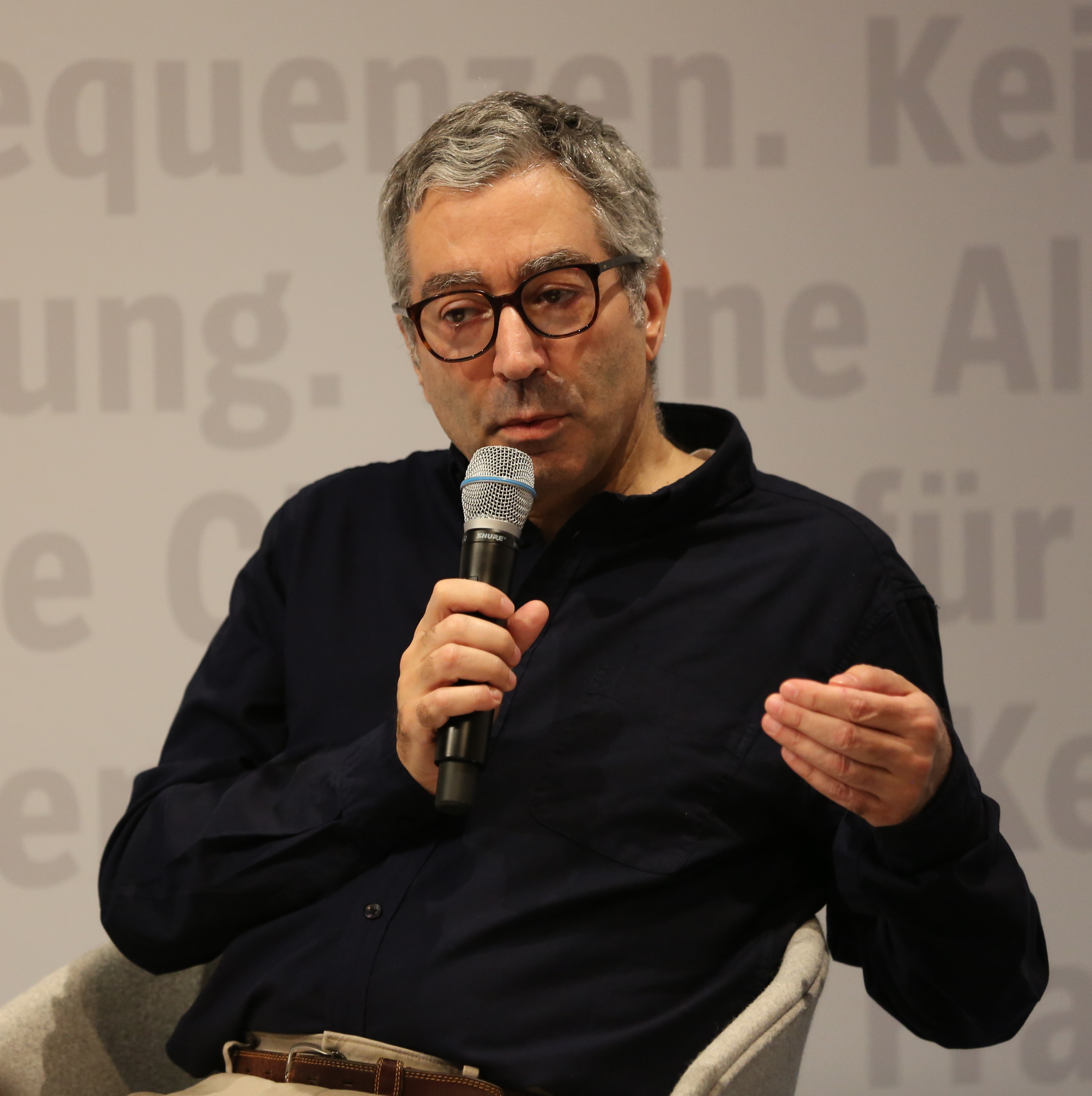
- Eribon in 2014
- Born: 10 July 1953 (age 73); Reims, France
- Occupation: Writer
- Writing career
- Language: French
- Genres: Non-fiction, sociology, philosophy
- Website: didiereribon.blogspot.fr

Didier Eribon (born 10 July 1953) is a French author and philosopher, and a historian of French intellectual life. He lives in Paris.

== Biography ==
Didier Eribon was born in Reims into a working-class family. He was the first in his family to finish secondary education. He credits his mother with helping him achieve this; a factory worker, she had to work overtime to be able to pay for his education.

== Work ==
Didier Eribon is professor at the School of Philosophy and Social Sciences of the University of Amiens (France). He has been running a seminar at the École des hautes études en sciences sociales in Paris for several years. He has also been visiting professor at the University of California, Berkeley for several years, and at the Institute for Advanced Study, Princeton.

Eribon has lectured in several countries: in the U.S., at The New School, University of Chicago, Harvard University, Yale University, New York University (NYU), the University of Michigan at Ann Arbor, the University of Virginia at Charlottesville, and Columbia University among others. He was one of the speakers at the Conference "Foucault in Berkeley. Twenty Years Later", held in Berkeley October 2004, with Leo Bersani, Judith Butler, Paul Rabinow, Hubert Dreyfus, Michael Lucey, and others.

He is the author of several books, including his Réflexions sur la question gay (1999, Insult and the Making of the Gay Self), Une morale du minoritaire (2001), and Echapper à la psychanalyse (2005, Escaping Psychoanalysis). His biography of Michel Foucault (1989), published in English in 1991, has been praised by Pierre Bourdieu, Paul Veyne, Paul Rabinow and Hayden White, among others. His 1988 book of conversations with Claude Lévi-Strauss was also published in English in 1991.

Eribon wrote frequently for Le Nouvel Observateur, a French weekly magazine. He reviewed books in the fields of philosophy and social sciences.

=== Autobiography ===
His 2009 memoir Returning to Reims has had an influence beyond the field of sociology. French novelist Édouard Louis cites the book as having "marked a turning point for his future as a writer."

Additionally, the book was adapted for the stage by Laurent Hatat, in a play that debuted at the Festival Avignon in July 2014. It was directed by Thomas Ostermeier as part of the 2017 Manchester International Festival. The book also received enthusiastic reviews in the French press, such as Le Monde, Libération, L'Express and Les Inrockuptibles.

A film adaptation Retour à Reims (Fragments) by Jean-Gabriel Périot was released in 2021.

== Prizes ==
Eribon is the recipient of the 2008 Brudner Prize. He returned the prize in May 2011 (see his letter: "I Return the Brudner Prize" on his personal homepage).

== Personal life ==
Didier Eribon has been in a relationship with Geoffroy de Lagasnerie since 2001. Both are in a close relationship with Édouard Louis.

== Bibliography ==
=== Monographs ===
- Michel Foucault, 1926–1984, Paris, Flammarion, 1989 (ISBN 978-2-08-081243-8)
  - Michel Foucault. Trans. Betsy Wing. Cambridge, MA: Harvard UP, 1991.
- Faut-il brûler Dumézil : mythologie, science et politique, Paris, Flammarion, 1992.
- Michel Foucault et ses contemporains, Paris, Fayard, 1994
- Réflexions sur la question gay, Paris, Fayard, 1999. (ISBN 978-2-213-60098-7)
  - English translation: Insult and the Making of the Gay Self. Translated by Michael Lucey. Duke University Press, 2004. 440 pages.
  - New edition, revised and augmented, Paris, Flammarion, coll. « Champs », 2012.
- Papiers d'identité : interventions sur la question gay, Paris, Fayard, 2000 (ISBN 978-2-213-60576-0)
- Une morale du minoritaire : variations sur un thème de Jean Genet, Paris, Fayard, 2001 (ISBN 978-2-213-60918-8)
- Hérésies : essais sur la théorie de la sexualité, Paris, Fayard, 2003 (ISBN 978-2-213-61423-6)
- Sur cet instant fragile… Carnets janvier-août 2004, Paris, Fayard, 2004 (ISBN 978-2-213-62279-8)
- Échapper à la psychanalyse, Paris, Éditions Léo Scheer, 2005 (ISBN 978-2-915280-93-7)
- D'une révolution conservatrice et de ses effets sur la gauche française, Paris, Éditions Léo Scheer, 2007.
- Contre l'égalité et autres chroniques, Les éditions Cartouche, 2008.
- Retour à Reims, Paris, Fayard, 2009.
- De la subversion : droit, norme et politique, Paris, Éditions Cartouche, 2010.
- Michel Foucault, 1926-1984, nouvelle édition, revue et augmentée, Paris, Flammarion, coll. « Champs : biographie », 2011.
- Retours sur Retour à Reims, Les éditions Cartouche, 2011.
- La société comme verdict : classes, identités, trajectoires, Paris, Fayard, 2013.
- Théories de la littérature : système du genre et verdicts sexuels, Paris, Presses universitaires de France, 2015.
- Principes d'une pensée critique, Paris, Fayard, 2016
- Écrits sur la psychanalyse, Paris, Fayard, 2019, 304 p. (ISBN 978-2-213-71138-6)
- Vie, vieillesse et mort d'une femme du peuple, Paris, Flammarion, 2023, 250 p.

=== Interviews ===
- Entretiens avec Georges Dumézil, Paris, Gallimard, 1987 (ISBN 2-07-032398-6).
- De près et de loin : entretiens avec Claude Lévi-Strauss, Paris, Odile Jacob, 1988.
  - Conversations with Claude Lévi-Strauss, by Claude Lévi-Strauss and Didier Eribon, Translated by Paula Wissing. Chicago: University of Chicago Press, 1991. 192 pages.
- Ce que l'image nous dit : entretiens sur l'art et la science, avec Ernst Gombrich, Paris, Adam Biro, 1991. Réédition aux Éditions Cartouche, 2009.
