= Judith Bartnoff =

American judge (born 1949)

Senior Judge of the Superior Court of the District of Columbia
- Incumbent
- Assumed office September 13, 2019

Associate Judge of the Superior Court of the District of Columbia
- In office August 1, 1994 – September 13, 2019
- President: Bill Clinton
- Preceded by: Eric Holder
- Succeeded by: Kendra D. Briggs

Personal details
- Born: April 14, 1949 (age 75); Boston, Massachusetts, U.S.
- Education: Radcliffe College (BA); Columbia University (JD); Georgetown University (LLM)

Judith Bartnoff (born April 14, 1949) is a senior associate judge of the Superior Court of the District of Columbia.

== Education and career ==
Bartnoff graduated from Taylor Allderdice High School in 1967. She earned her Bachelor of Arts from Radcliffe College, her Juris Doctor from Columbia Law School and her Master of Laws from Georgetown University Law Center.

=== D.C. Superior Court ===
On January 28, 1994, President Bill Clinton nominated Bartnoff to a fifteen-year term as an associate judge on the Superior Court of the District of Columbia to the seat vacated by Eric Holder. On June 29, 1994, the Senate Committee on Governmental Affairs held a hearing on her nomination. On July 14, 1994, the Committee reported her nomination favorably to the senate floor. On July 15, 1994, the full Senate confirmed her nomination by voice vote. She was sworn in on August 1, 1994. On May 18, 2009, the Commission on Judicial Disabilities and Tenure recommended that President Obama reappoint her to a second fifteen-year term as a judge on the D.C. Superior Court. She assumed senior status on September 13, 2019.
