= Michel Foucault (Eribon book) =

1989 biography by Didier Eribon

- Author: Didier Eribon
- Language: French
- Subject: Biography
- Publisher: Flammarion, Harvard University Press
- Publication date: 1989
- English publication date: 1991

Michel Foucault is a 1989 biography of the French philosopher Michel Foucault by Didier Eribon. It was first published in French by Flammarion, followed by Betsy Wing's English translation in 1991 for Harvard University Press.

== Bibliography ==
- de Boisdeffre, Pierre (1990). "Des institutions et des mythes". Revue des Deux Mondes (in French): 186–194. ISSN 0750-9278. JSTOR 44185754.
- Goldhammer, Arthur (1990). "Review of Michel Foucault". French Politics and Society. 8 (1): 78–83. ISSN 0882-1267. JSTOR 42844148.
- Harris, Michael H. (1993). "Review of Michel Foucault". The Library Quarterly: Information, Community, Policy. 63 (1): 115–116. doi:10.1086/602536. ISSN 0024-2519. JSTOR 4308781.
- Jones, Raymond (1993). "Review of Michel Foucault". Theory and Society. 22 (3): 434–441. ISSN 0304-2421. JSTOR 657742.
- Lezra, Jacques (1994). "Foucault's Perfection". Contemporary Literature. 35 (3): 593–623. doi:10.2307/1208698. ISSN 0010-7484. JSTOR 1208698.
- Liebsch, Burkhard (1992). "Zwischen Epistemologie und Ethik". Philosophische Rundschau (in German). 39 (3): 186–213. ISSN 0031-8159. JSTOR 42571999.
- Martin, Luther H. (1995). "The discourse of (Michel Foucault's) life: A review essay". Method & Theory in the Study of Religion. 7 (1): 57–69. doi:10.1163/157006895X00216. ISSN 0943-3058. JSTOR 23555529.
- Montefiore, Alan (1994). "Review of Michel Foucault". The Journal of Modern History. 66 (3): 629–631. doi:10.1086/244916. ISSN 0022-2801. JSTOR 2124515.
- Mudimbe, V. Y. (1992). "Saint Paul-Michel Foucault". Transition (57): 122–127. doi:10.2307/2935160. ISSN 0041-1191. JSTOR 2935160.
- Rawson, Claude (1994). "The Masks of M. Foucault". The Sewanee Review. 102 (3): 471–476. ISSN 0037-3052. JSTOR 27546898.
- "Review of Michel Foucault". The Wilson Quarterly. 16 (4): 88–89. 1992. ISSN 0363-3276. JSTOR 40258589.
- Robinson, Paul (1992). "Review of Michel Foucault". The American Historical Review. 97 (5): 1485. doi:10.2307/2165950. ISSN 0002-8762. JSTOR 2165950.
- Sirinelli, Jean-François (1991). "Review of Michel Foucault (1926-1984)". Vingtième Siècle. Revue d'histoire (in French) (29): 109–110. doi:10.2307/3769600. ISSN 0294-1759. JSTOR 3769600.
- Szakolczai, Arpad (1993). "Review of The Foucault Effect: Studies in Governmentality, with Two Lectures by and an Interview with Michel Foucault.; Michel Foucault.; Foucault: Historian or Philosopher?". Contemporary Sociology. 22 (2): 279–281. doi:10.2307/2075812. ISSN 0094-3061. JSTOR 2075812.
- Verley, Xavier (1993). "Review of Michel Foucault (1926-1984), « Champs »". Revue Philosophique de la France et de l'Étranger (in French). 183 (1): 111–112. ISSN 0035-3833. JSTOR 41096976.
