= Kendra D. Briggs =

American judge (born 1974)

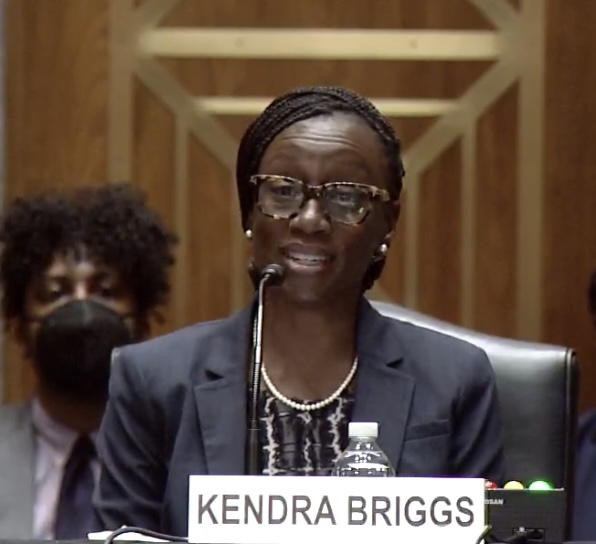

Associate Judge of the Superior Court of the District of Columbia
- Incumbent
- Assumed office January 17, 2023
- Appointed by: Joe Biden
- Preceded by: Judith Bartnoff

Personal details
- Born: Kendra Nicole Davis; December 19, 1974 (age 51) Miami, Florida, U.S.
- Education: Florida A&M University (AA); Florida State University (BS); University of Miami (JD)

Kendra Davis Briggs (born December 19, 1974) is an American lawyer who has served as an associate judge of the Superior Court of the District of Columbia since 2023. She previously was an assistant United States attorney from 2010 to 2023.

== Education ==
Briggs received her Associate of Arts from Florida A&M University and her Bachelor of Science from Florida State University in 1996 and her Juris Doctor, cum laude, from the University of Miami School of Law in 2002.

== Career ==
Briggs served as a law clerk to Justice Peggy Quince of the Florida Supreme Court. From 2002 to 2006, she was a senior associate at Parks & Crump, LLC, a Florida-based law firm, from 2006 to 2008, she served as an associate general counsel for the Florida Department of Transportation. From 2008 to 2010, Briggs was an attorney in private practice at Shook, Hardy & Bacon LLP in Washington, D.C. In 2010, she began serving as an assistant United States attorney in the United States Attorney's Office for the District of Columbia where she was a senior assistant United States Attorney in the Public Corruption and Civil Rights Section. Briggs also previously served as the 5th District community prosecutor.

=== D.C. superior court service ===
On November 3, 2021, President Joe Biden nominated Briggs to serve as a judge of the Superior Court of the District of Columbia. President Biden nominated Briggs to the seat vacated by Judge Judith Bartnoff, whose term expired on September 13, 2019. On July 12, 2022, a hearing on her nomination was held before the United States Senate Committee on Homeland Security and Governmental Affairs. On September 28, 2022, her nomination was favorably reported out of committee by voice vote en bloc, with Senators Rick Scott and Josh Hawley voting "no" on record. On December 15, 2022, the Senate confirmed her nomination by voice vote. She was sworn in on January 17, 2023.

Legal offices
Preceded by Judith Bartnoff	Judge of the Superior Court of the District of Columbia; 2023–present	Incumbent
