= Jamie Metzl =

American geopolitical commentator and author (born 1968)

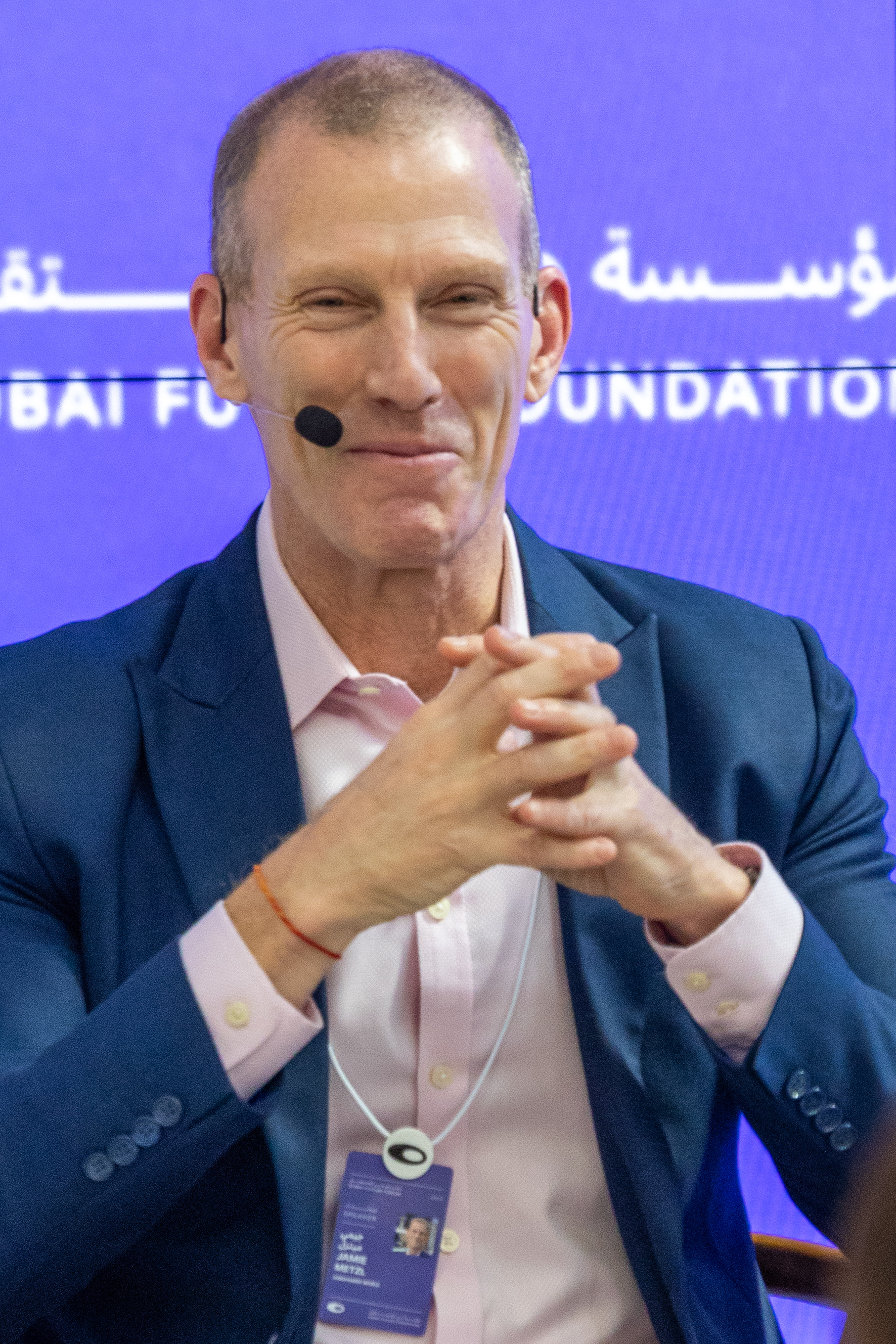
- Metzl at the Dubai Future Forum in 2024
- Born: July 1, 1968 (age 58); Kansas City, Missouri, U.S.
- Education: Brown University (BA); University of Oxford (PhD); Harvard Law School (JD)
- Website: https://jamiemetzl.com/profiles/

Jamie Frederic Metzl (born July 1, 1968) is an American technology and healthcare futurist. He is a founder and Chair of the global social movement OneShared.World, a Senior Fellow of the Atlantic Council, a faculty member of NextMed Health, and a Singularity University expert.

Metzl has been appeared on national and international media and his syndicated columns, podcast conversations with Joe Rogan, Lex Fridman, and others, and interviews on AI, science, technology, and global affairs. He is the author of seven books, including the newly-released Superconvergence: How the Genetics, Biotech and AI Revolutions Will Transform Our Lives, Work, and World, the international bestseller, Hacking Darwin: Genetic Engineering and the Future of Humanity, and the sci-fi thrillers Genesis Code and Eternal Sonata.

== Early life and education ==
Metzl was born in Kansas City, Missouri. He is the third of four sons of Kurt and Marilyn Metzl. His father, an Austrian-born Holocaust survivor and pediatrician, died from cancer in April 2025. His mother, originally from Queens, New York, practiced for many decades as a psychologist and psychoanalyst in Kansas City.

He attended high school at The Barstow School in Kansas City, Missouri. He graduated from Brown University. He holds a Ph.D. in Southeast Asian history from Oxford University (1994), and a J.D. from Harvard Law School in 1997. He was a White House Fellow.

== Career ==
In 1988, at the age of 19, Metzl volunteered as a teacher and teacher trainer for Cambodian, Hmong, and Vietnamese refugees in the Panat Nikhom refugee camp in Chonburi, Thailand, an experience that had a profound impact on his life. From 2001 to 2003, he took a leave of absence from his Ph.D. program at Oxford University, where he was writing his dissertation on the international community’s failure to prevent the Cambodian genocide, to serve as a Human Rights Officer for the United Nations Transitional Authority in Cambodia. There, he helped establish a nation-wide human rights investigation and monitoring unit. After completing his Ph.D. program in a record two years of study, he then attended Harvard Law School, where he was active in both the human rights and technology communities. While a student at Harvard Law School, he began publishing pieces in Foreign Affairs and the American Journal of International Law on how strategic information campaigns could and should have been used to help prevent the genocide in Rwanda and other crises. Following his graduation from Harvard Law School in 1997, he served for six years in the United States government where he led efforts develop America’s strategic engagement with newly development information technologies, including the early-stage internet.

From 1997 to 1999, he was Director for Multilateral and Humanitarian Affairs in the U.S. National Security Council, serving under National Security Advisor Sandy Berger and Senior Directors Richard Clarke and Eric Schwartz, where he became deeply engaged with issues relating to emerging capabilities in machine learning, genetics, and biotechnology, which has subsequently been the topic of four of his books and other work. In the Clinton administration, he was the primary drafter of Presidential Decision Directive 68 on International Public Information

At the NSC, he created and led the International Public Information initiative, an effort to coordinate and strategically leverage all U.S. government information efforts in conflict zones, particularly the former Yugoslavia.

He led information operations to counter the propaganda of then Serbian president Slobodan Milosevic, including by establishing the “Ring Around Serbia” transmission towers broadcasting the Serbian language programming of the VOA, BBC, RFI, and other networks into Serbia. Metzl was the originator and drafter of Presidential Decision Directive 68, an executive order President Clinton signed in April 1999 establishing information as a recognized domain of U.S. strategy.

Metzl’s role in formulating and implementing America’s strategic communications strategies have been described in multiple articles and books, including Forging Peace: Intervention, Human Rights and the Management of Media Space.

From 1999 to 2001, he was Senior Advisor on International Public Information at the U.S. Department of State, serving under then Secretary of State Madeleine Albright.

From 2001 to 2003, he served as Deputy Staff Director of the U.S. Senate Committee on Foreign Relations under then Chairman Joe Biden and Staff Director Antony Blinken.

In 2003, he served briefly as Project Director for the Council on Foreign Relations Task Force on Emergency Preparedness. When released, its report, Drastically Underfunded, Dangerously Unprepared, received a great deal of public attention. Metzl appeared alongside co-chair Senator Warren Rudman on Meet the Press with Tim Russert in June 2003 and testified before Congress calling for significantly enhancing preparations for future crises.

Metzl moved back to his hometown of Kansas City, Missouri to run for U.S. Congress. In the Democratic primary of the heavily democratic Fifth District, he was defeated by former Kansas City mayor Emanuel Cleaver. In 2004, he was recruited by a mentor, Richard Holbrooke, to become Executive Vice President of the Asia Society, an international not-for-profit headquartered in New York City, of which Holbrooke had recently become board chair.

Metzl served in that capacity for six years, where he played the role establishing the Asia-Pacific leadership development network Asia 21, transformational policy initiatives, and revamped media and social media strategies.

In 2008, Metzl was the lead witness in a U.S. House of Representatives hearing on Genetics and Other Human Modification Technologies.

In 2014, he became a partner in the global holding company Cranemere LLC, a position which he left following the release of his books exploring the future of AI, genetics, and biotechnology.

In 2019, following both the publication of Hacking Darwin: Genetic Engineering and the Future of Humanity and the highly controversial birth of the world’s first “CRISPR babies” in China, Metzl was appointed to the World Health Organization Expert Advisory Committee on Human Genome Editing by WHO Director-General Tedros Adhanom Ghebreyesus.

In 2020, he created the global interdependence movement, OneShared.World, which brough together people from around the world to draft a Declaration of Interdependence, which has been translated into twenty languages. The Dalai Lama, WHO Director General Tedros Adhanom Ghebreyesus, opera artist Fenee Fleming and Sting.

Metzl has also served as an election monitor in Afghanistan and the Philippines and advised the government of North Korea on the establishment of Special Economic Zones. He is a current board member of Partnership for a Secure America, the American University in Mongolia and Parsons Dance and previously served on the boards of HIAS, Park University, and the International Center for Transitional Justice. Metzl has been a vocal proponent of the COVID-19 lab leak theory. In March 2023, he testified at the Select Subcommittee on the Coronavirus Pandemic invited by U.S. House Republicans.

Metzl has been called “the original COVID-19 whistleblower“ for his efforts calling for a full investigation into pandemic origins. Since early 2020, he has been a leading voice raising the possibility of a COVID-19 research related origin.In April 2020, he launched his “Origins of SARS-CoV-2,” website. His July 2020 Wall Street Journal editorial raising questions about pandemic origins and August 2020 The Hill editorial calling for the establishment of a 9/11-style commission.

Metzl was the co-organizer and lead drafter of open letters issued by the “Paris Group” of experts, of which he was a leading member, that were released on March 4, April 7, April 30, and June 28, 2021 and covered by media.

In 2021, 60 Minutes ran a feature highlighting Metzl’s work on pandemic origins. Metzl was also the lead witness in the March 2023 U.S. congressional hearings on COVID-19 origins, the first such hearings held anywhere in the world.

In 2021, he co-established, along with the global financial services firm WisdomTree, the WisdomTree BioRevolution ETF. The publicly listed exchange-traded fund largely tracks the thesis regarding the intersection of AI, genetics, and biology Metzl outlined in Hacking Darwin.

In 2025, he was appointed as a Commissioner of The Lancet Commission on Precision Medicine, which will develop over four years what is expected to be the definitive report on the future of technology-enhanced healthcare.

Metzl has been an advocate of bipartisan collaboration on U.S. foreign and national security policy for decades. Along with Warren Rudman and Lee Hamilton, he co-founded in 2004 the national security organization Partnership for a Secure America. He served as PSA’s board co-chair for over two decades.

From 2023-2024, Metzl served as the lead Democratic commissioner in the Heritage Foundation Nonpartisan Commission on China and COVID-19, alongside lead Republican and Commission chair, John Ratcliffe. The commission’s report, released in July 2024, detailed the aggregate costs of the COVID-19 pandemic and outlined essential next steps for preventing similar future crises. In 2024, Metzl recruited other previous staff of then President Joe Biden to sign a petition he had drafted calling on the president to not seek reelection and allow for a competitive primary to select an alternate candidate.

Metzl is the author of six books, including the newly-released Superconvergence: How the Genetics, Biotech, and AI Revolutions Will Transform Our Lives, Work, and World, the international bestseller Hacking Darwin: Genetic Engineering and the Future of Humanity, the sci-fi thrillers Genesis Code and Eternal Sonata, the historical novel The Depths of the Sea, and a history of the Cambodian genocide.

Metzl’s short story “A Visit to Weizenbaum” was made into the 2021 short film Source Code. Metzl provides keynote addresses on the impact and implications of revolutionary technologies to corporations, organizations, and associations, and was the lead keynote speaker at the inaugural Dubai Future Forum.

He serves as a strategic advisor on the future of AI to organizations and has been a featured speaker at AI summits across the globe. He also lectures to health and health-related organizations about the future of healthcare and sits on the advisory boards of Genomic Prediction, Harvard Medical School Preventive Genomics, the Lake Nona Impact Forum.

== Honors and awards ==
Metzl has been selected as a White House Fellow, an Aspen Institute Crown Fellow, and a French-American Foundation Young Leader.

He is the former Honorary Ambassador to North America of the Republic of Korea Ministry of Trade and Industry and the current Honorary Global Investment Ambassador to the Mayor of Seoul.

== Personal life ==
Metzl lives in New York City. An avid skier, ultramarathon runner, and ironman triathlete, Metzl has completed 60 marathons, 13 ironman triathlons, and 40 ultramarathons. His experience training with the East Timorese Olympic running team was highlighted by the New York Times in 2001, and his grueling experience completing a 19 hour ultramarathon in a Taiwanese rainforest was featured in Trail Runner in 2017.

== Works ==
- Jamie Frederic Metzl (1996). Western Responses to Abuses in Cambodia, 1975-80. St. Martin's Press. ISBN 0-333-64325-9.
- Jamie Frederic Metzl (May 2004). The Depths of the Sea. St. Martin's Press. ISBN 0-312-32202-X.
- Jamie Frederic Metzl (2014) Genesis Code, Arcade. ISBN 1628724234
- Jamie Frederic Metzl (2016) Eternal Sonata, Arcade. ASIN: B01HDVCR4U
- Jamie Frederic Metzl (April 2019) Hacking Darwin: Genetic Engineering and the Future of Humanity, Sourcebooks. ISBN 149267009X
- Metzl, Jamie Frederic (2024). Superconvergence: how the genetics, biotech, and AI revolutions will transform our lives, work, and world. Portland, Oregon: Timber Press. ISBN 978-1-64326-300-7.
- Metzl, Jamie Frederic (April 21, 2026). The AI Ten Commandments: A New Moral Code for Humanity. Transcend Books. ISBN 9798994572603.
