= Marc Solomon =

American LGBTQ rights activist

- Born: November 12, 1966 (age 60); Kansas City, Missouri
- Education: Barstow School
- Alma mater: Yale College
- Occupation: Gay rights advocate

Marc E. Solomon (born November 12, 1966) is a gay rights advocate. He was the national campaign director of Freedom to Marry, a group advocating same-sex marriage in the United States. Solomon is author of the book Winning Marriage: The Inside Story of How Same-Sex Couples Took on the Politicians and Pundits—and Won (ForeEdge, publication date November 12, 2014). As executive director of MassEquality from 2006 through 2009, he led the campaign to defeat a constitutional amendment that would have reversed Massachusetts' same-sex marriage court ruling. Politico describes Solomon as "warm and embracing" and "a born consensus builder—patient, adept at making personal connections, preternaturally gifted at politics without seeming at all like a politician."

== Background ==
Solomon was born and grew up in Kansas City, Missouri. He graduated from the Barstow School in 1985 and Yale College in 1989. At Yale, he was a resident of Berkeley College, an economics and political science major, and co-editor of the Yale Economics and Business Review. He graduated magna cum laude with honors in his major. In 2004, Solomon earned a master's degree in public administration from Harvard University's Kennedy School of Government.

=== Early career ===
Solomon worked on Capitol Hill for Senator Jack Danforth, Republican of Missouri, in two different stints, first as a legislative correspondent (1989) and then as legislative assistant (1991–1994). In between, he worked as a researcher for Washington Post reporter Bob Woodward on his book The Commanders, an account of White House and Pentagon decision-making during the first Gulf War. Solomon joined Danforth in St. Louis and served as vice president of St. Louis 2004, a non-profit organization to make improvements to the St. Louis region by 2004, the centennial of the St. Louis World's Fair.

== Same-sex marriage in Massachusetts ==
Solomon began his work on marriage equality as a volunteer for the Massachusetts Freedom to Marry Coalition in 2001 and worked as a lobbyist for the group in 2002 as it helped defeat a constitutional amendment that would ban gay couples from marrying. Following the marriage ruling in Goodridge v. Department of Public Health in November 2003, Solomon went to work full-time as legislative director of the Massachusetts Freedom to Marry Coalition and then as political director of MassEquality. In January 2006, Solomon took the helm of MassEquality and led the organization in defeating a constitutional amendment that would have barred same-sex couples from marrying. The final vote on the amendment, which took place on June 14, 2007, was 151 opposed and 45 in favor, holding supporters just beneath the 25% threshold they required.

Among the key elements of the campaign's success was re-electing every incumbent who voted against a constitutional amendment in two consecutive election cycles, 2004 and 2006, a total of 195 out of 195.

Following defeat of the amendment, Solomon led efforts to repeal the "1913 Law" in Massachusetts, a long dormant law which Governor Mitt Romney used to prevent same-sex couples living in other states from marrying in Massachusetts.

== Same-sex marriage nationwide ==
Following the Massachusetts victory, Solomon consulted with other New England state LGBT equality organizations on strategies to secure same-sex marriage. In 2009, following the passage of Proposition 8 in California, Solomon left MassEquality to become marriage director for Equality California.

In 2010, Solomon joined Freedom to Marry to serve as national campaign director, managing all of the organization's campaign programs and helping to grow the organization from a $2 million to a $13 million effort over the course of three years. At Freedom to Marry, Solomon played leadership roles in winning marriage in multiple states, including New York, Illinois, Minnesota, Washington, and Maine. On behalf of Freedom to Marry, he led efforts to secure a same-sex marriage plank in the Democratic National Committee 2012 platform, which was credited with helping to encourage President Obama to publicly support same-sex marriage in May 2012. He's also led in the creation of Mayors for the Freedom to Marry, which now includes more than 500 mayors from 44 states.

== Winning Marriage ==
On November 12, 2014, Solomon released a book called Winning Marriage: The Inside Story of How Same-Sex Couples Took on the Politicians and Pundits – and Won. The book was published by Fore Edge/University Press of New England. On September 8, 2015, the paperback edition of the book was released with a new section on practical lessons from the marriage campaign that are applicable to other social movements and an afterword on the historic nationwide ruling on marriage in June 2015.

Winning Marriage, with a foreword by Massachusetts Governor Deval Patrick, was praised by Bob Woodward, Dee Dee Myers, and Senator Tammy Baldwin and was named a "Best Book of 2014" by Slate Magazine, whose review said "Winning Marriage may well stand as the definitive political history of marriage equality." Congressman Barney Frank called Winning Marriage "by far the best, and most accurate, of the accounts to legalize same-sex marriage."

A senior political strategist for the marriage movement for more than a decade, Solomon takes readers inside the White House, the Supreme Court, governors' offices and state capitols, as well as into the war rooms of marriage campaigns throughout the country, showing how the campaign for marriage equality has been waged and how it has prevailed.

U.S. News & World Report calls Winning Marriage "a playbook for progressive causes." The Boston Globe Sunday Magazine, The New Republic, and Salon have run excerpts from the book, and it's been the subject of a New York Times column. The book was also featured on Meet the Press with Chuck Todd.

The book was also reviewed in the Daily Beast, Ms. Magazine, and the Huffington Post.

== Personal life ==
Solomon resides in New York City with his husband, educator and blogger Daniel Barrett.

== Selected writings ==
- "Op-ed: Talking to People About Equality Does Indeed Change Minds" (Advocate, May 2015)
- "Inside the Supreme Court’s Gay-Marriage Debate" (Daily Beast, April 2015)
- "The Wedding Planner: A Q&A with Freedom to Marry’s Marc Solomon" (Metro Weekly, November 2014)
- Winning Marriage: The Inside Story of How Same-Sex Couples Took on the Politicians and Pundits—and Won (ForeEdge, November 2014)
- "Last of the Anti-Gay Marriage Judges" (The Daily Beast, September 5, 2014)
- "Mass. marriage victory offers key tactical lessons," Boston Globe, May 17, 2014
- "The Mitt I Battled" (Huffington Post, October 30, 2012)
- "A Tale of Two Conventions" (Huffington Post, September 7, 2012)
- "How We Won New York" (Huffington Post, June 30, 2011)
- "How We Thwarted NOM’s Attack Plan in NH" (Advocate, March 29, 2012)
- "How We Will Win" (Advocate, March 1, 2011)

== Recognition ==
- Rockefeller Foundation Next Generation Leadership Fellowship (1998–1999)
- Franklin Delano Roosevelt Award, Massachusetts Democratic Party (May 2009)
- Lifetime Achievement Award, Elections Committee of Orange County (October 2009)
- Congressman Gerry E. Studds Visibility Award, Fenway Health (March 2013)
- Hacham Lev Award, Keshet (2008)
