= Dubai Future Forum =

Annual conference in Dubai, UAE

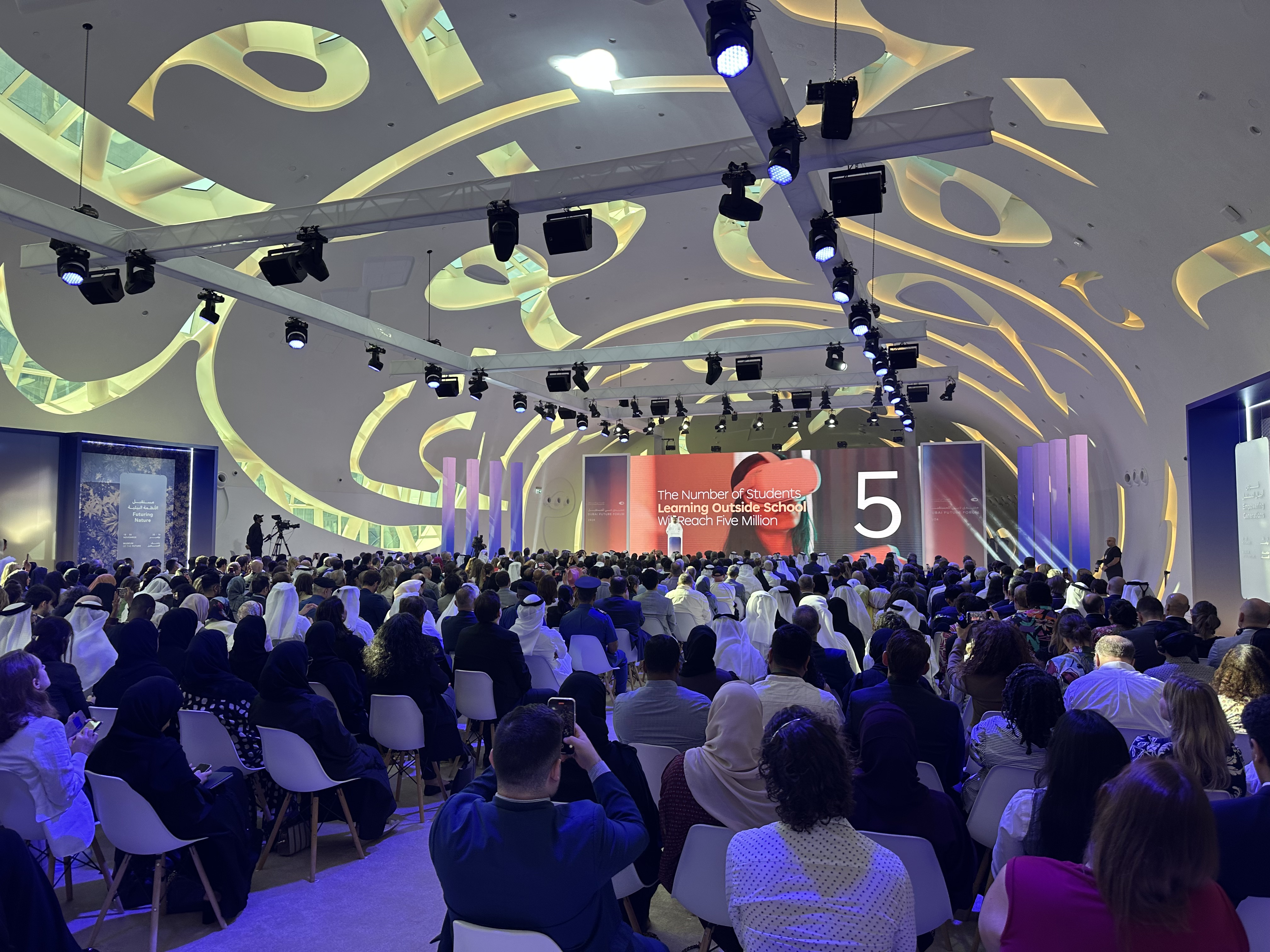
Dubai Future Forum plenary session, seventh floor of the Museum of the Future

The Dubai Future Forum is an annual event organized by the Dubai Future Foundation in Dubai, United Arab Emirates. The forum is held at the Museum of the Future and brings together futurists, experts, and leaders from around the world to discuss the future of various sectors, including technology, economy, and society. It was launched in 2022 as a global conference for foresight and future studies claiming to be the world’s largest gathering of futurists.

== Events ==
=== 2022 edition ===
The inaugural Dubai Future Forum was held on 11–12 October 2022 at the Museum of the Future. It featured over 400 futurists and experts from more than 45 organizations and included speakers such as Michio Kaku, Jamie Metzl, and Amy Webb.

=== 2023 edition ===
The second edition of the forum took place November 2023, focusing on "Regenerating Nature" with a focus on climate, food, and nature-related topics. Keynote speakers included Mary Lou Jepsen, whurley, and Hazza Al Mansouri, UAE's first astronaut.

=== 2024 edition ===
Dubai Future Solutions hall (view as a 360° interactive panorama)

The third edition was held with the theme of "Empowering Generations" featuring speakers Makoto Suzuki, Paul Saffo, Jordan Nguyen, Amy Webb, and Sara Sabry. It was advertised as the "world’s largest gathering of futurists, experts, and organisations specialised in future design" with 150 speakers and 2,500 attendees.

The event also coincided with World Children's Day (November 20) and hosted the launch of UNICEF's report "State of the World’s Children."

== Gallery ==
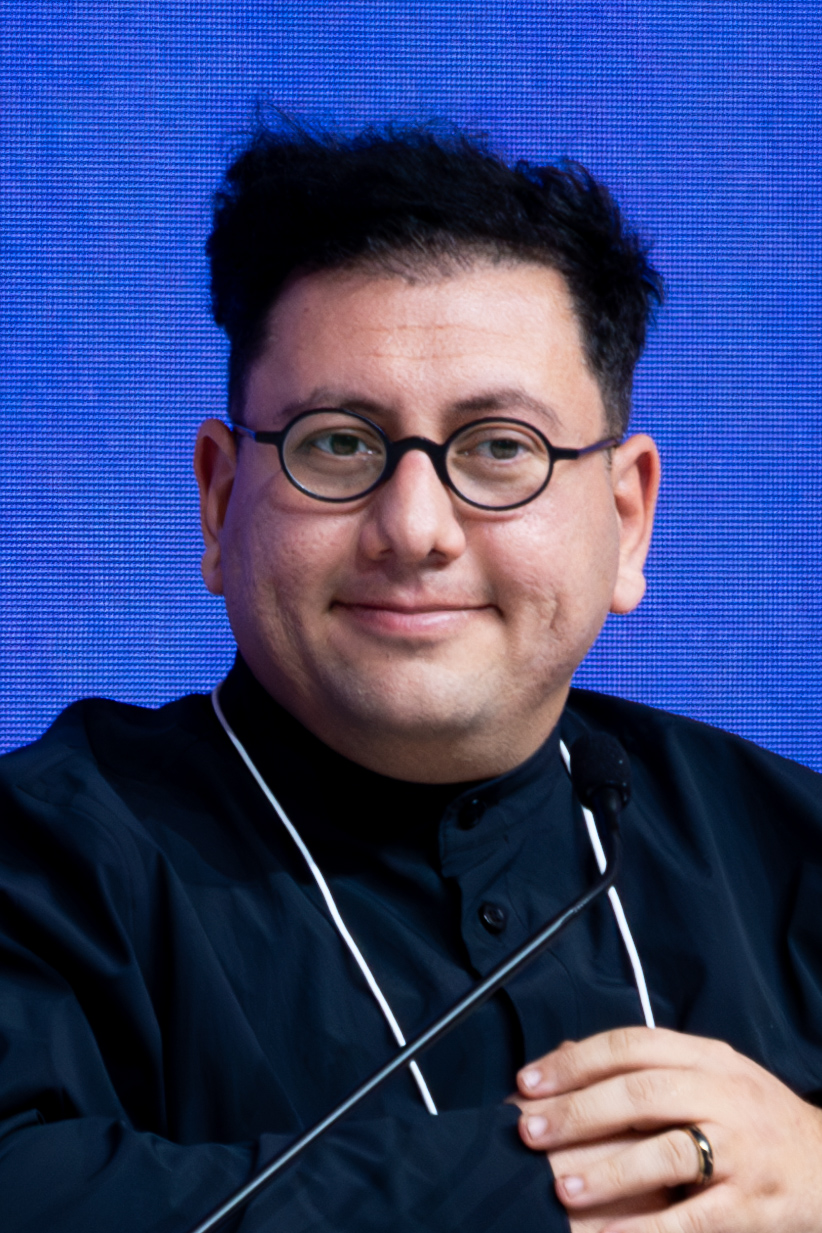
Refik Anadol, digital artist (2024)

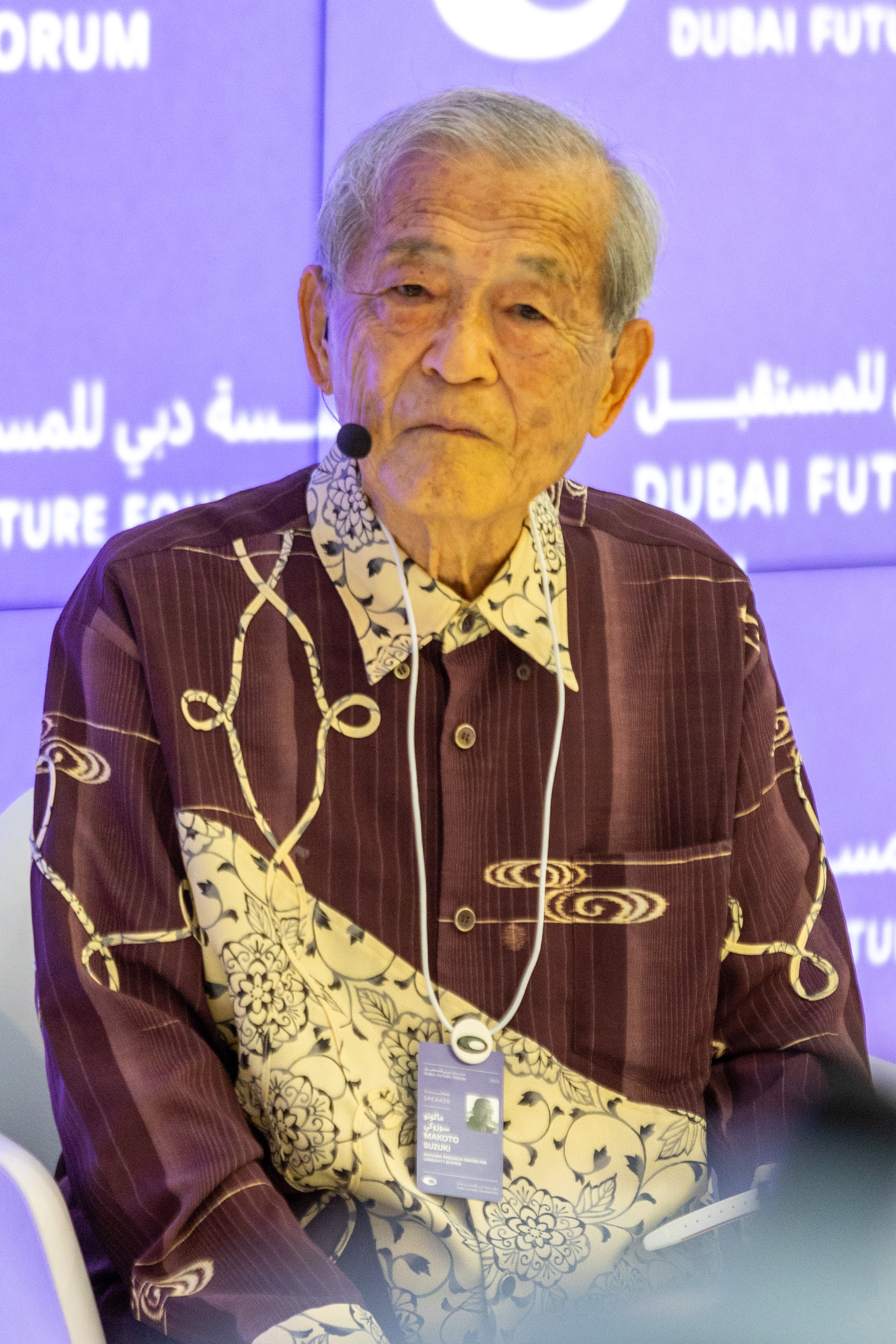
Makoto Suzuki (2024)

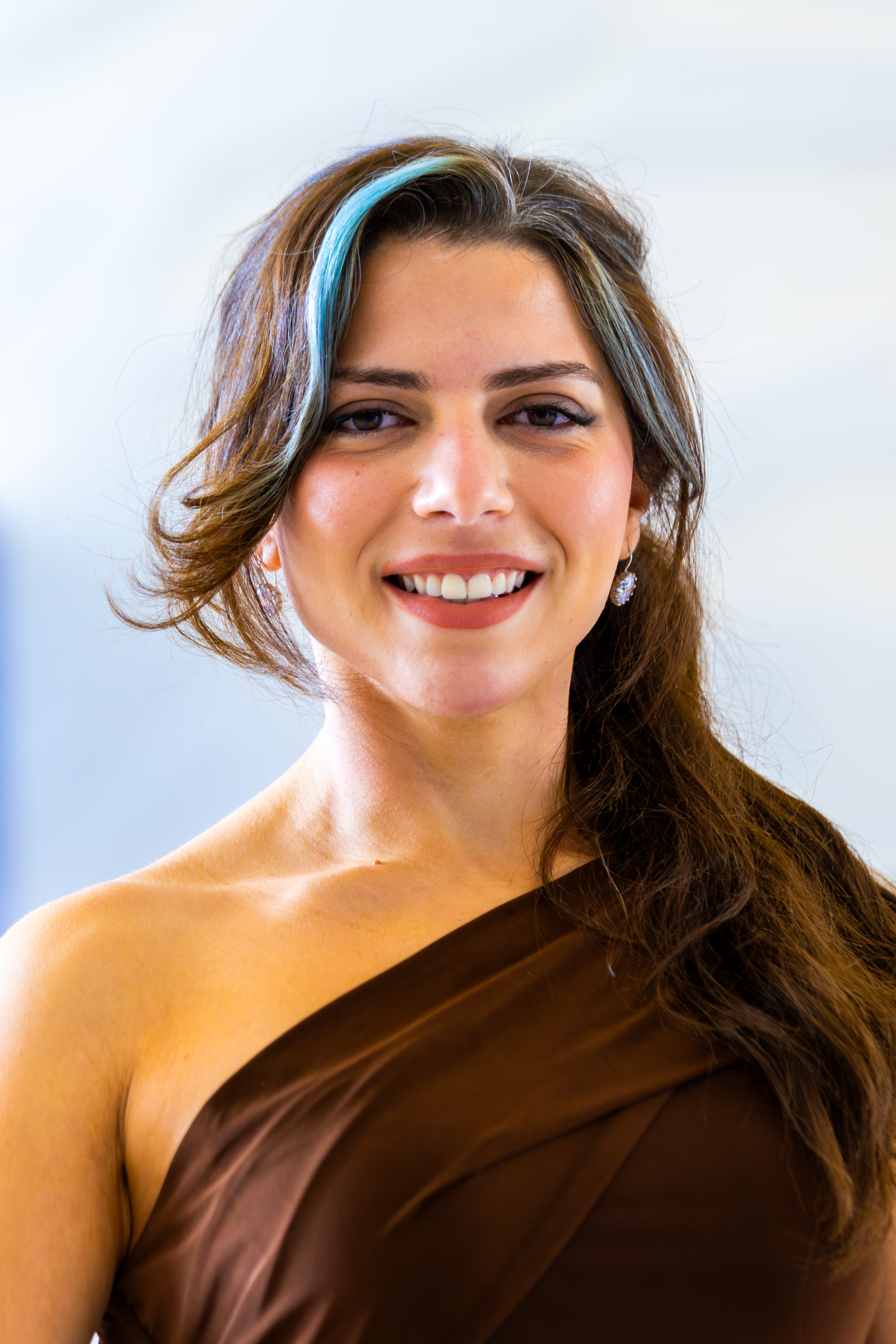
Sara Sabry, astronaut and scientist (2024)

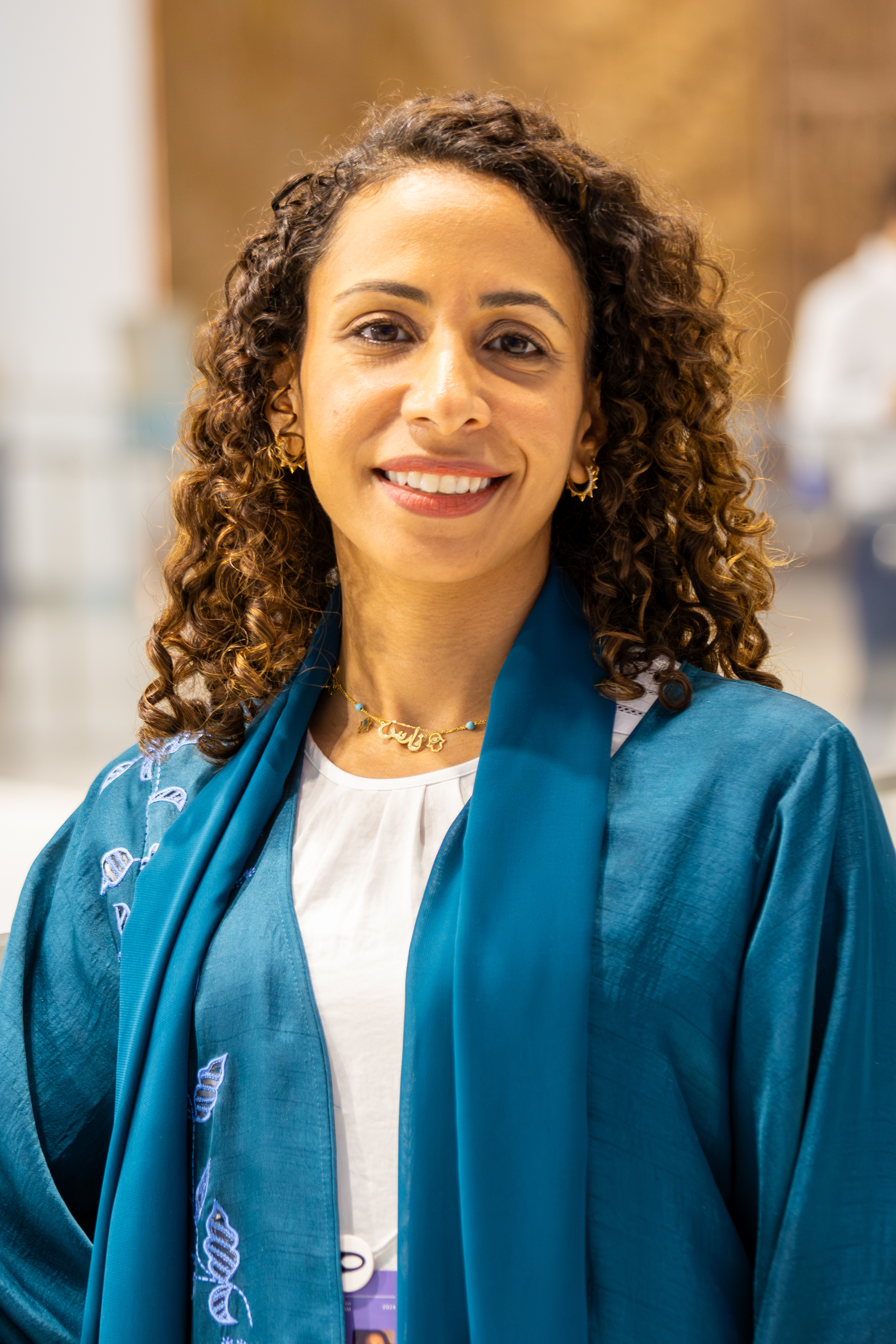
Suaad Al Harthi, National Geographic Explorer and scientist (2024)

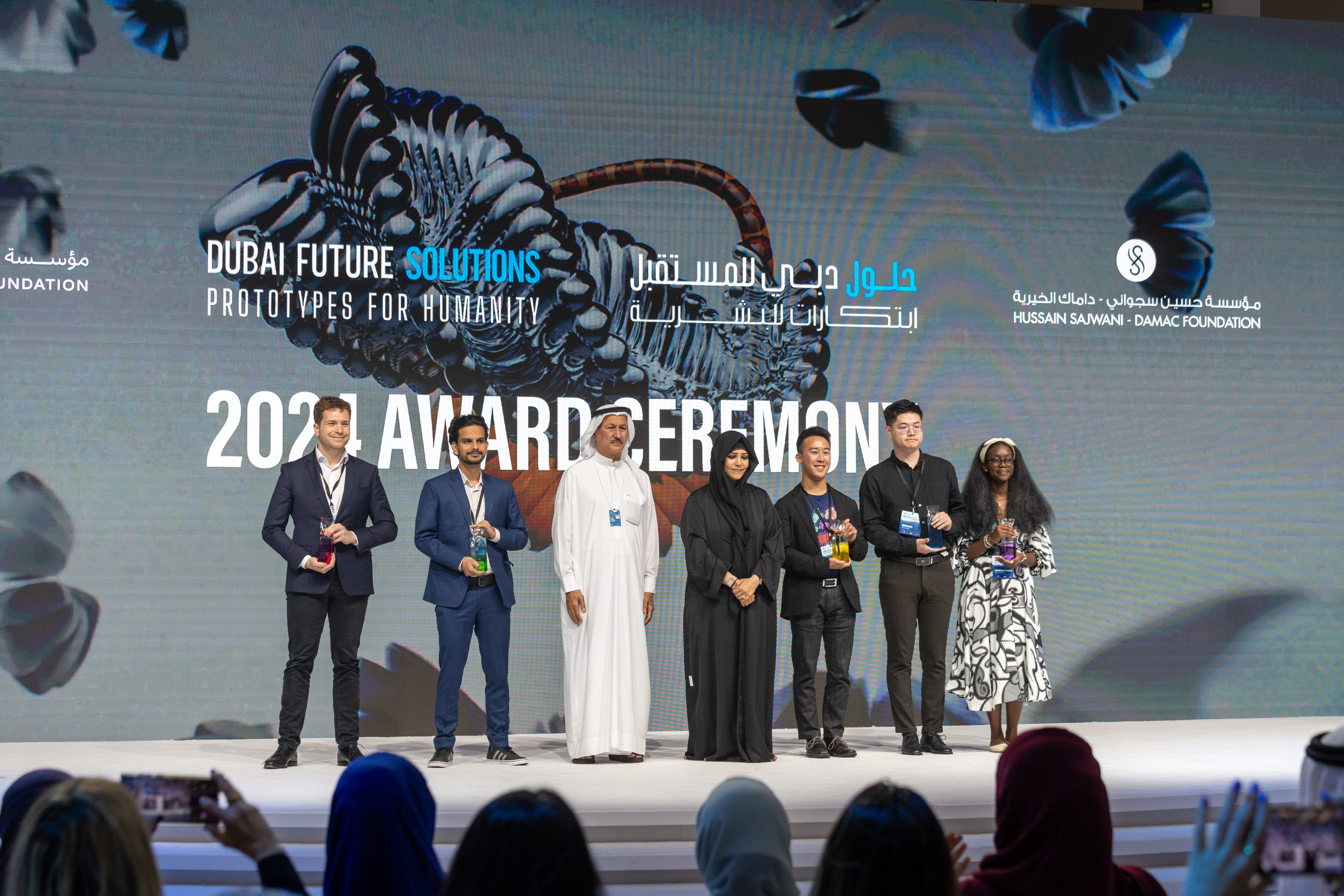
Dubai Future Solutions awards ceremony

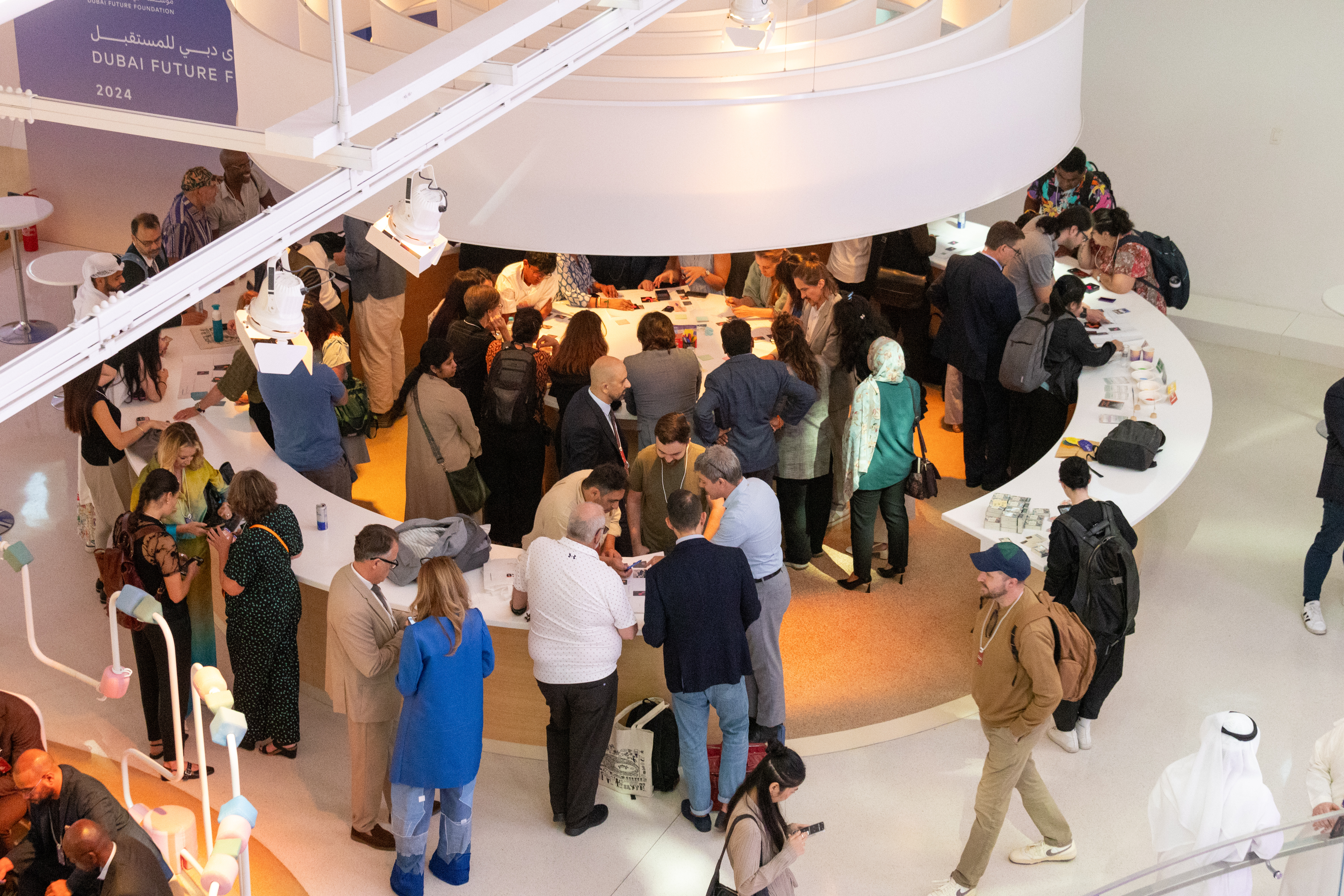
Dubai Future Forum activation station

== See also ==
- Museum of the Future
- World Government Summit
