= Mary Bonauto =

American lawyer

- Born: June 8, 1961 (age 65); Newburgh, New York, U.S.
- Education: Hamilton College; Northeastern University School of Law
- Occupation: Lawyer
- Known for: Gay & Lesbian Advocates & Defenders; GLBTQ Legal Advocates & Defenders
- Awards: Brudner Prize, MacArthur fellow

Mary L. Bonauto (born June 8, 1961) is an American lawyer and civil rights advocate who has worked to eradicate discrimination based on sexual orientation and gender identity, and has been referred to by US Representative Barney Frank as "our Thurgood Marshall." She began working with the Massachusetts-based Gay & Lesbian Advocates & Defenders, now named GLBTQ Legal Advocates & Defenders (GLAD Law) organization in 1990. A resident of Portland, Maine, Bonauto was one of the leaders who both worked with the Maine legislature to pass a same-sex marriage law and to defend it at the ballot in a narrow loss during the 2009 election campaign. These efforts were successful when, in the 2012 election, Maine voters approved the measure, making it the first state to allow same-sex marriage licenses via ballot vote. Bonauto is best known for being lead counsel in the 2003 case Goodridge v. Department of Public Health which made Massachusetts the first state in which same-sex couples could marry in 2004. She is also responsible for leading the first strategic challenges to section three of the Defense of Marriage Act (DOMA).

On April 28, 2015, Bonauto was one of three attorneys who argued before the U.S. Supreme Court in Obergefell v. Hodges arguing state bans on same-sex marriage to be unconstitutional. This much-publicized case determined that state bans against same-sex marriage are unconstitutional and is considered one of the most important civil rights cases which came before the U.S. Supreme Court in modern history.

== Biography ==
Bonauto was born in 1961 and grew up in Newburgh, New York in a Roman Catholic family. She graduated from Hamilton College and Northeastern University School of Law. In 1987, after graduating from law school, she entered private practice in Maine, where she was at the time one of three openly gay private practice lawyers in the state. She lives in Portland with her spouse Jennifer Wriggins, who is a professor at the University of Maine School of Law. The couple were married in Massachusetts. They have twin daughters.

Bonauto has litigated widely in areas such as job and public accommodations discrimination, securing domestic partner benefits and relationship protections, establishing second parent rights and de facto parent status, vindicating First Amendment protections, and challenging anti-gay harassment and violence. She has worked on public policy in all six New England states, and occasionally writes for legal publications. Bonauto filed her first marriage case in Vermont in July 1997.

Yale University awarded its 2010-2011 Brudner Prize, which recognizes "an accomplished scholar or activist whose work has made significant contributions to the understanding of LGBTQ issues or furthered the tolerance of LGBT people," to Bonauto.

In 2011, Bonauto was named one of the 50 most-powerful women in Boston by Boston Magazine.

In 2012, she was named by Equality Forum as one of their 31 Icons of the LGBT History Month.

In March 2013, Roberta Kaplan, the lawyer arguing for DOMA repeal in the Supreme Court, told the New York Times, "No gay person in this country would be married without Mary Bonauto." Former US Representative Barney Frank, said "She's our Thurgood Marshall."

In June 2013 immediately following the DOMA Supreme Court decision, she was called in Slate a "Gay Marriage Hero" and "the legal architect of the DOMA repeal."

She was named a MacArthur fellow in September 2014 for her work "breaking down legal barriers based on sexual orientation".

In May 2016, she was awarded an honorary Doctor of Laws by Harvard University for "establishing the freedom to marry for same-sex couples nationwide".

== Work on same-sex marriage ==
=== Vermont ===
In 1997, Bonauto, on behalf of GLAD Law, along with Beth Robinson and Susan Murray, filed a lawsuit in Vermont on behalf of three couples seeking the freedom to marry: Stacy Jolles and Nina Beck; Stan Baker and Peter Harrigan; and Holly Puterbaugh and Lois Farnham. The suit, Baker v. State of Vermont was ultimately appealed to the Vermont Supreme Court, which ruled in the couples' favor but invited the Vermont Legislature to legislate a solution. In the spring of 2000, the Vermont Legislature enacted civil unions, which extended to same-sex couples all of the state-level benefits of marriage but in a different system from marriage itself.

=== Massachusetts ===
GLAD Law led by Bonauto filed suit in Massachusetts on behalf of seven gay and lesbian couples denied the freedom to marry in 2001. In the case, known as Goodridge v. Department of Public Health, the Massachusetts Supreme Judicial Court on November 18, 2003, became the first state high court to rule that excluding gay people from civil marriage violates equal protection guarantees. Same-sex couples began marrying on May 17, 2004. The November 2003 ruling was contested politically for a number of years, but in June 2007, more than three-fourths of the state legislature voted to reject any proposal to amend the state constitution and reverse the Goodridge decision.

=== Connecticut ===
In August 2004, GLAD Law, including Bonauto, filed suit in Connecticut on behalf of seven gay and lesbian couples who wished to marry. The Connecticut legislature responded by passing a civil union law the next year. On May 14, 2007, GLAD Law attorney Bennett Klein, joined by Bonauto, argued for the couples in the Connecticut Supreme Court. On October 10, 2008, GLAD Law won a ruling that it was unjustified discrimination to place same-sex couples in the separate and lesser status of civil unions, and that sexual orientation was a "quasi-suspect" classification for equal protection purposes.

=== Maine ===
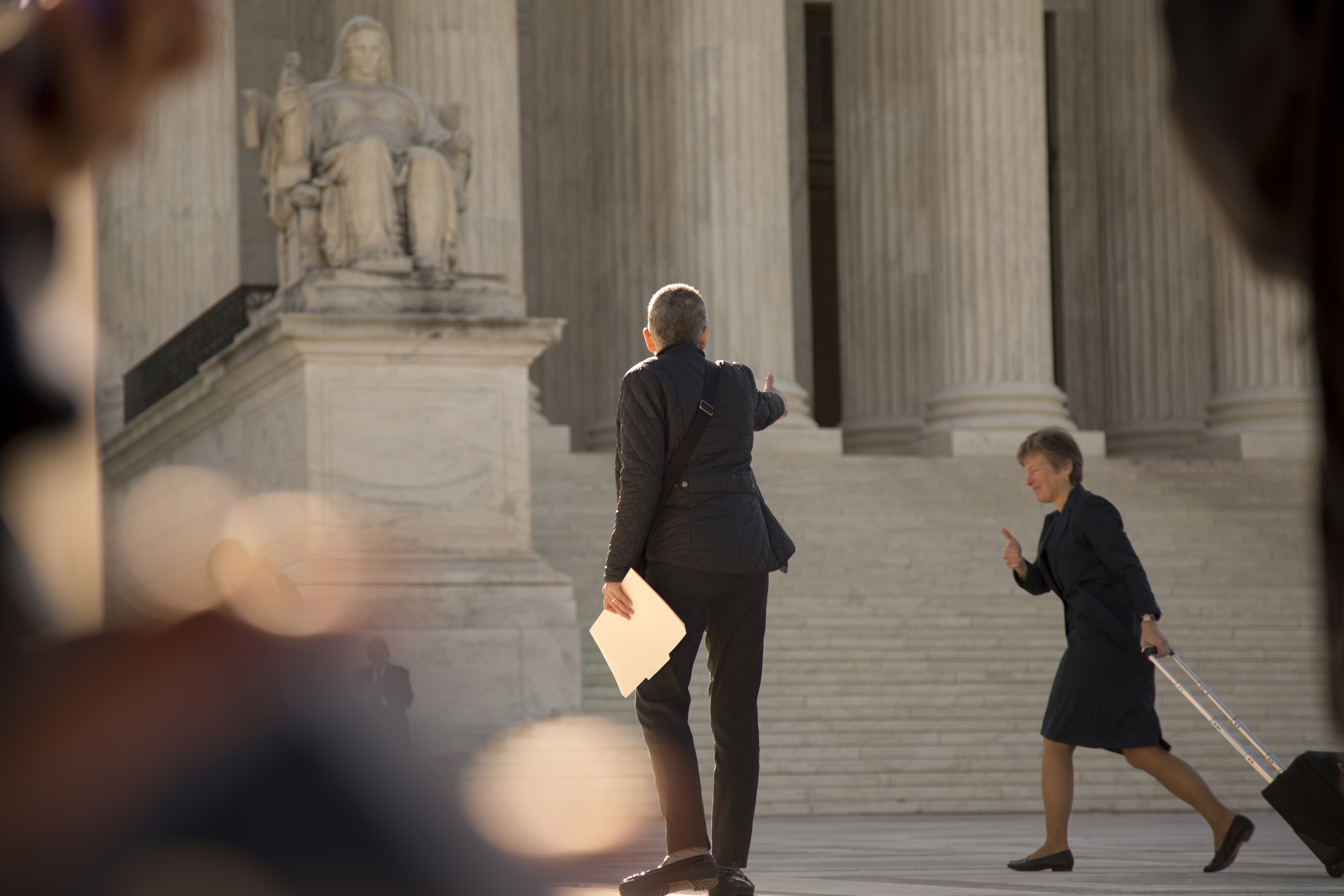
Mary Bonauto (with suitcase) gives the thumbs up as she enters the Supreme Court in 2015.

In 2009, Maine became the first state to pass a same-sex marriage law through the legislature, instead of through the court system, and also have it signed into law by the Governor. Bonauto was instrumental in the campaign to enact the law, and was the architect of an unprecedentedly large public hearing on April 22, 2009, where proponents and opponents presented their arguments. After the law was passed, a "people's veto" referendum campaign was begun and the voters overturned the law in November 2009, by a 53–47 margin. In the wake of this veto, Mary Bonauto was a leader in the coalition that came together to run a two-year public education campaign, that led in January 2012 to a direct ballot vote on the issue. On November 6, 2012, voters confirmed the right of same-sex couples to receive a marriage license, the law taking effect on December 29, 2012, becoming the first state to do so by ballot vote.

=== Obergefell v. Hodges ===
In March 2015, lawyers preparing to argue a consolidation of the Supreme Court cases titled Obergefell v. Hodges selected Bonauto to argue on behalf of the Michigan case DeBoer v. Snyder and the Kentucky case Love v. Beshear. On June 26, 2015, the Supreme Court ruled in favor of Bonauto and the plaintiffs thus declaring all state bans on same-sex marriage unconstitutional.

== DOMA ==
=== Gill v. Office of Personnel Management ===
In March 2009, Bonauto and GLAD Law, along with co-counsel from Foley Hoag, Jenner & Block, and Sullivan & Worcester, filed in U.S. District Court in Boston a lawsuit challenging the constitutionality of section 3 of the Defense of Marriage Act (DOMA). The case claims that the federal definition of marriage created by DOMA to exclude married same-sex couples from all federal marital protections violates equal protection guarantees. U.S. District Judge Joseph L. Tauro heard oral arguments from Bonauto and co-counsel on the merits of the case on May 6, 2010. On July 8, 2010, Judge Tauro ruled that Section 3 of DOMA is unconstitutional with respect to claims brought by the seven married same-sex couples and three widowers from Massachusetts GLAD Law is representing in the case. The Department of Justice will now decide whether to appeal the ruling. On October 12, 2010, the Department of Justice filed a notice to appeal the District Court ruling. On May 31, 2012, the U.S. Court of Appeals for the First Circuit upheld the District Court decision finding section 3 of DOMA unconstitutional. In July 2012 the Department of Justice filed a petition for certiorari in the United States Supreme Court but the petition was denied in the wake of the Court's landmark decision in United States v. Windsor that Section 3 of DOMA was unconstitutional.

=== Pederson v. Office of Personnel Management ===
On November 9, 2010, Bonauto and GLAD Law filed a second major, multi-plaintiff lawsuit challenging the constitutionality of the federal Defense of Marriage Act (DOMA) Section 3. The case specifically addressed married couples in Connecticut, Vermont and New Hampshire. On July 31, 2012, the Connecticut Federal District Court Judge Bryant ruled that DOMA is unconstitutional. On June 26, 2013, the U.S. Supreme Court ruled DOMA Section 3 unconstitutional in United States v. Windsor.

== Recognition ==
In January 2025, President Joe Biden named Bonauto as a recipient of the Presidential Citizens Medal.

== See also ==
- EqualityMaine
