= Petit Bé =

Tidal island near Saint-Malo in Ille-et-Vilaine, France

Coordinates: 48°39′9″N 2°2′18″W

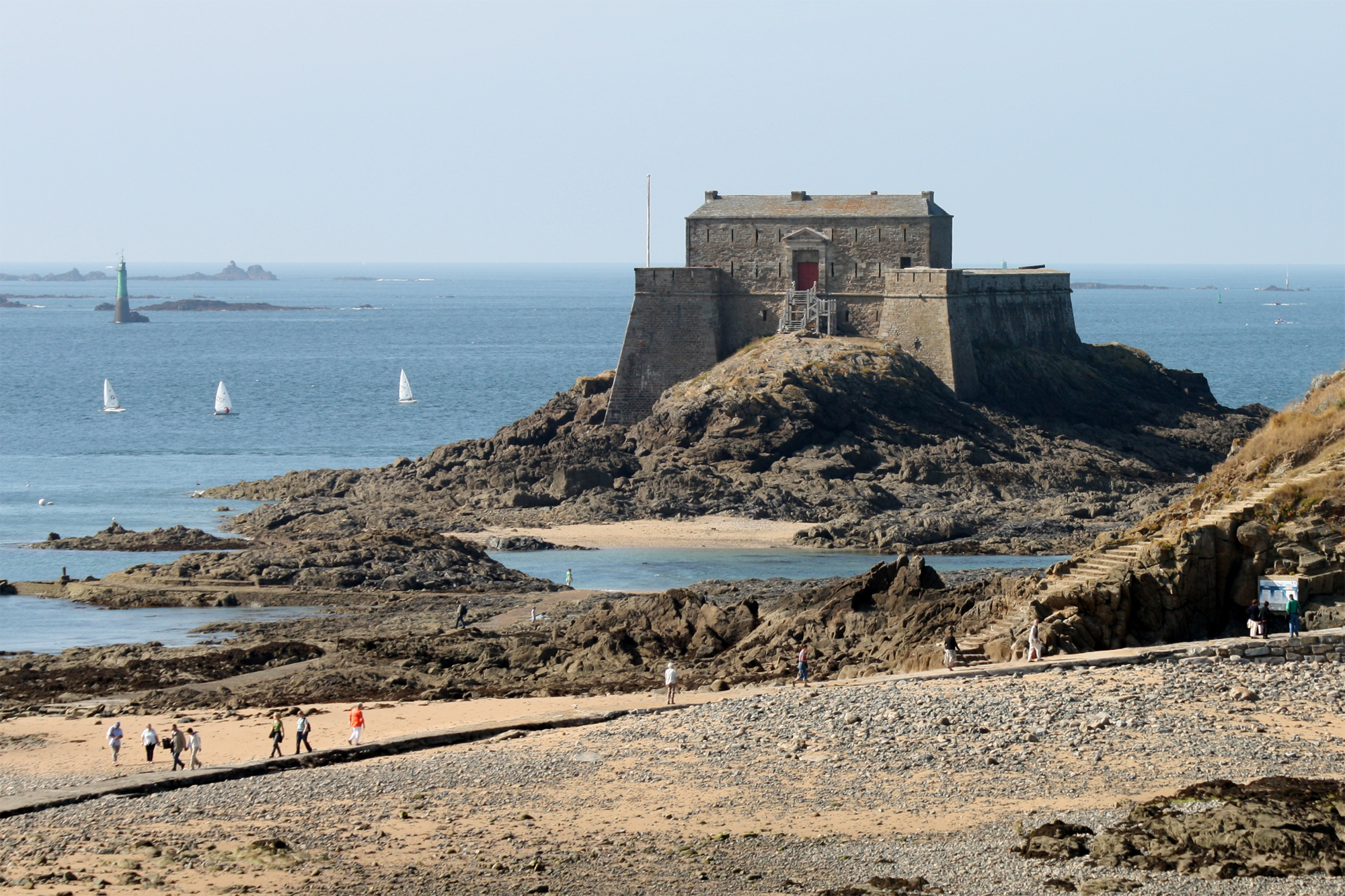
Petit Bé fort at low tide, seen from the Saint-Malo walls

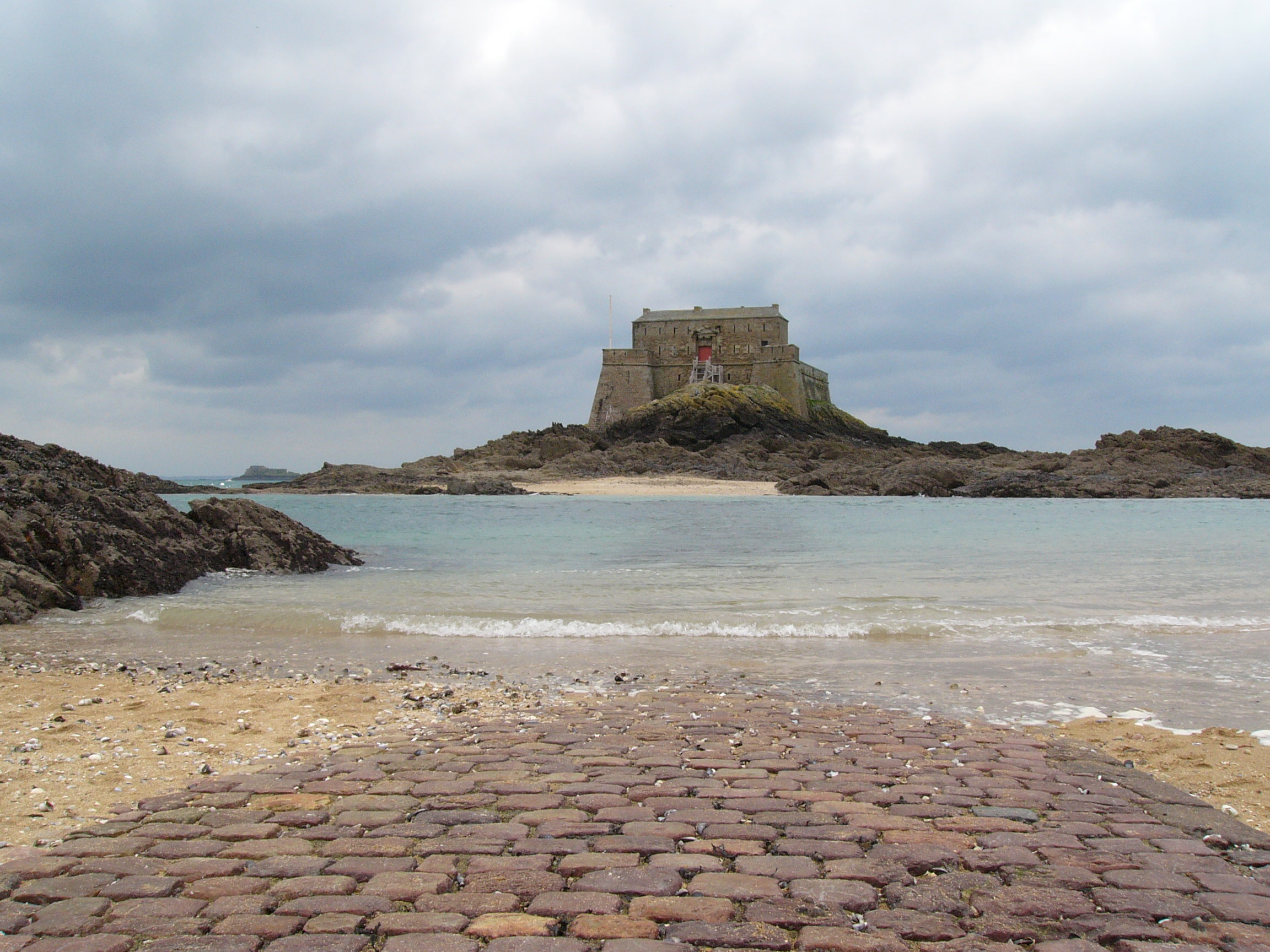
Petit Bé fort see from Grand Bé

Petit Bé (Breton: Nebeut Bezañ) is a tidal island near the city of Saint-Malo, France, close to the larger island of Grand Bé. At low tide one can walk to the island from the nearby Bon-Secours beach.

== Fort ==
In 1667 the French government built a small fort on the island of Petit Bé. Construction on the present fort began in 1689.

The fort was part of the defenses that Vauban designed to protect Saint-Malo from British and Dutch fleets. The defensive works included the walls of Saint Malo, Fort National, Fort Harbourg, Fort de la Conchée, and the forts of Cézembre and Pointe de la Varde; these last two have been destroyed.

Construction began under the direction of the engineer Siméon Garangeau. The fort was still under construction in at the time of the British attack on Saint-Malo in November 1693. When an Anglo-Dutch force attacked Saint-Malo again in 1695, the fort helped repel the attack.

The fort consists of a horseshoe-shaped battery on the seaward side that has 19 embrasures for guns. In 1695 it held nine guns; two years later it was armed with 15 guns, including four 48-pounders and six 36-pounders, as well as two mortars. A garrison of 177 soldiers defended the fort and served its guns. On the landward side the fort consisted of two half-bastions that flank the entrance, which is a few metres above the level of the rocks. The bastions are loopholed for muskets to enable the defenders to resist attempts to scale the defences. Several different plans were advanced for a demi-lune outwork in front of the entrance but in the end none was built. Cross-fire from Petit Bé and Fort Harbourg in Dinard protected the estuary of the Rance. The fort was finally finished in 1707.

The French army occupied the fort until 1885. Later, the army turned the fort over to the city of Saint-Malo. It became a Monument historique in 1921, but was neglected until 2000, when the city gave it to a non-profit organization rent-free to renovate it and prepare it for tourism. Under the direction of Alain-Etienne Marcel, the fort has been restored. Brush was removed from the embrasures, some of which received period cannons. The cistern had to be emptied of garbage and it now retains storm water fed into it from the restored roof of the barracks building.

== See also ==
- Grand Bé
