= Château de Saint-Malo =

Castle in Saint-Malo, France

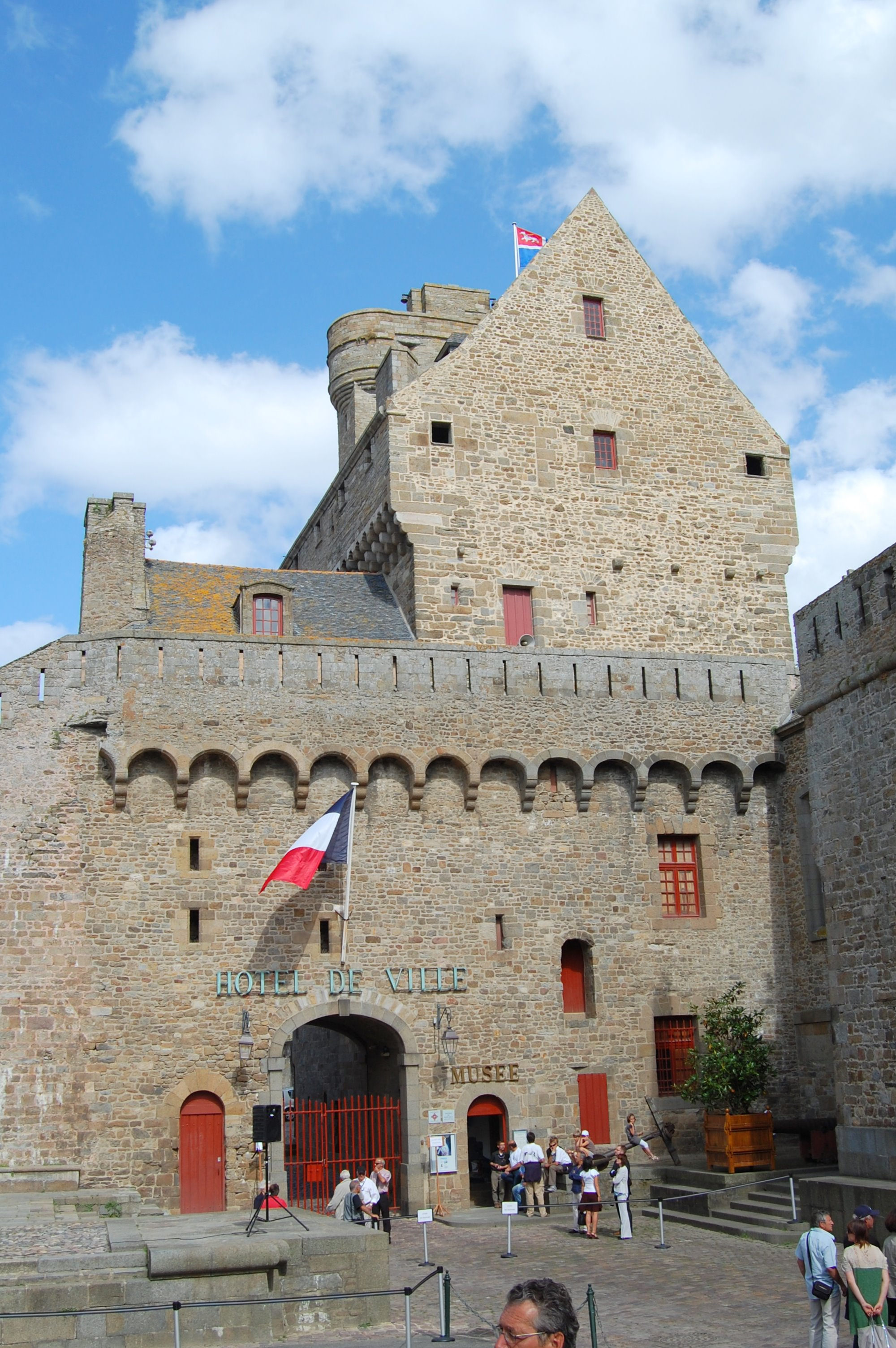
- The château in August 2008
- Interactive map of the Château de Saint-Malo area

General information
- Type: Château
- Architectural style: Medieval style
- Location: Saint-Malo, France
- Coordinates: 48.6515°N 2.0227°W
- Completed: 1424

The Château de Saint-Malo (Breton: Kastell Sant-Maloù), also known as the Château de la Duchesse Anne (Kastell an dugez Anna), is an historic building in Saint-Malo, Ille-et-Vilaine, in western France, standing at the northeast corner of the walled city. It was designated a monument historique by the French government in 1886.

== History ==
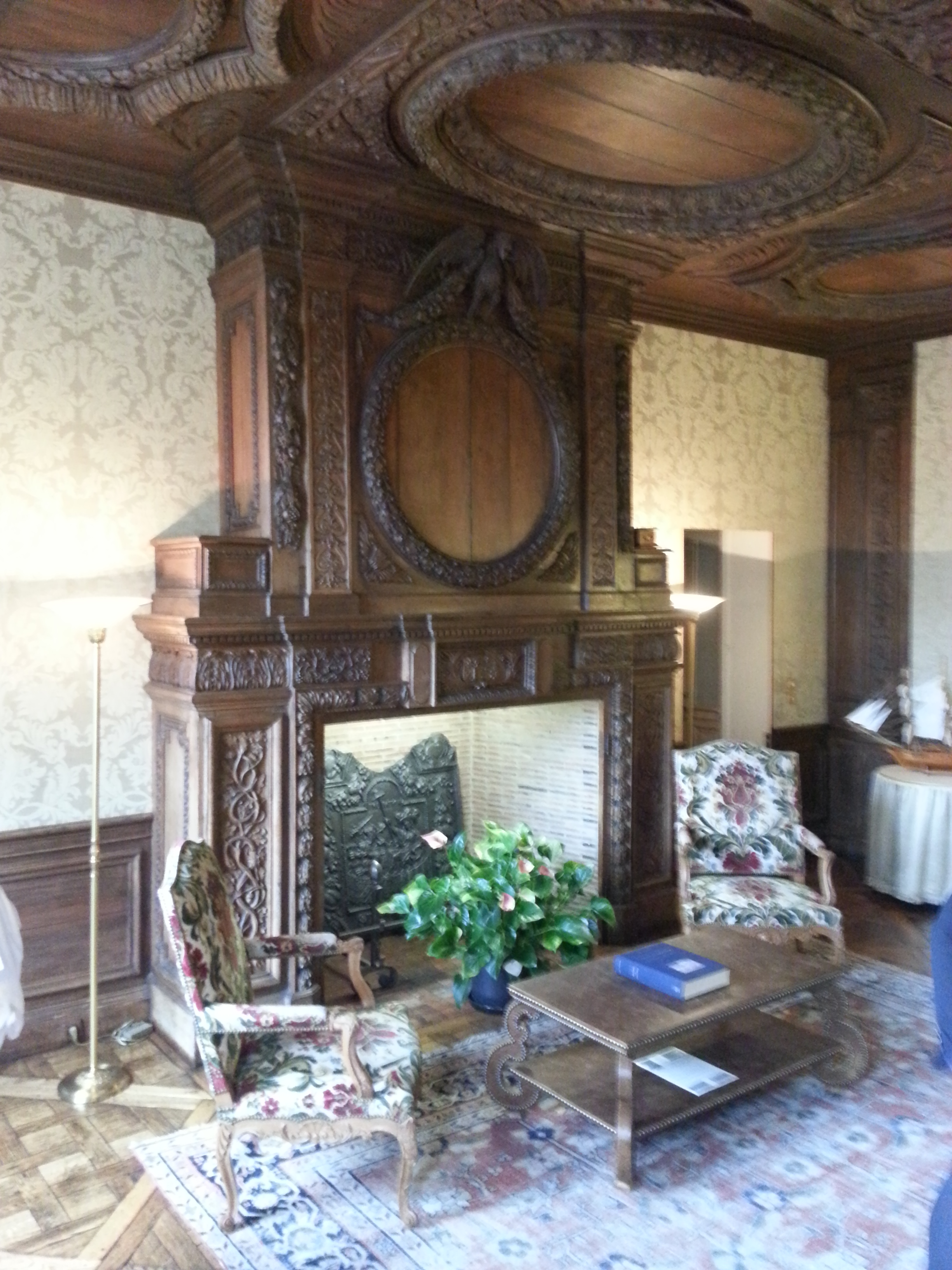
The mayor's parlour

The castle was commissioned by John V, Duke of Brittany for the purposes of subjugating his people. The earliest part of the castle was a horseshoe-shaped keep, known as the "Grand Donjon" (Grand Keep), completed in 1424. This was augmented in 1475, when Francis II, Duke of Brittany, commissioned a large tower, known as "La Générale" (the General) at the southwest corner of the site. This was followed by the "Tour Quic-en-Groigne" (Who's Grumbling Tower), (Note: Quic-en-Groigne (Who's Grumbling) is a term often applied to fortifications; construction often ran into difficulties and the local seigneur responded "who's grumbling?") in the northwest corner, which Francis's daughter, Anne, commissioned in 1498. Two more towers, the "Tour des Dames" (Tower of the Ladies) at the northeast corner and the "Tour des Moulins" (Tower of the Mills) at the southeast corner were commissioned shortly thereafter.

In 1590, the local people stormed the castle to prevent the governor of the castle from swearing allegiance to the protestant Henry IV; this issue was resolved when Henry IV converted to Catholicism four years later.

A triangular shaped bastion was added at the northeast corner in the 17th century and, following an inspection by the military engineer, Sébastien Le Prestre, Marquis of Vauban, the ramparts were strengthened, and barrack blocks were added on the north and east sides of the central courtyard. The site was stormed by local people during the French Revolution and, in the early 19th century, the barrack blocks were again used for accommodating military personnel.

The town council acquired the whole complex in 1921, and the former barracks were used for public administration. During the Second World War, the château was bombarded for two days by American artillery and aircraft during the Battle of Saint-Malo. Troops from the American 330th Infantry Regiment liberated the walled city on the morning of 14 August 1944, but it was late in the afternoon before 150 German troops who were holding the château finally surrendered.

After the war ended, the town council led by the mayor, Guy La Chambre, instigated the restoration of the Grand Donjon, which had been badly damaged in the fighting. The barrack blocks were converted for municipal use as the Hôtel de Ville (town hall). Fine panelling dating from the 17th century, which had been recovered from the former Hôtel Marion du Fresne, which had been destroyed in the fighting, was installed in the mayor's parlour in 1952.

The Musée d’Histoire de la Ville et du Pays Malouin (Museum of the History of the City and Country of Saint-Malo) occupied much of the Grand Donjon and La Générale from the late 1940s, until it closed in November 2019.
