= Grand Bé =

Tidal island near Saint-Malo in Ille-et-Vilaine, France

Coordinates: 48°39′8″N 2°2′0″W

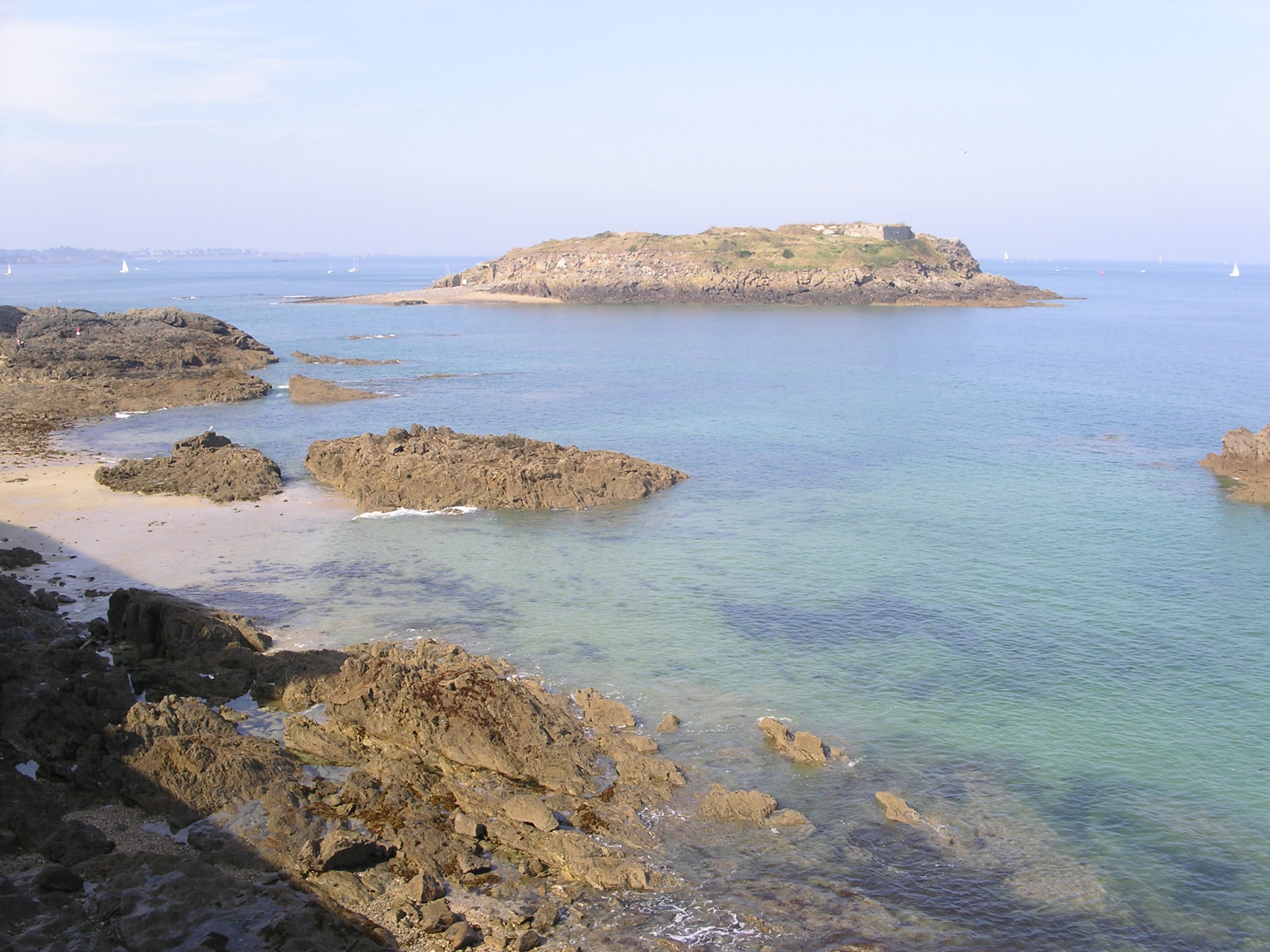
Grand Bé island, seen from Saint-Malo walls

Grand Bé (Breton: Bras Bezañ) is a tidal island near Saint-Malo, France. It is located at the mouth of the Rance River, a few hundred metres from the walls of Saint-Malo. At low tide the island can be reached on foot from the nearby Bon-Secours beach. On the island are the remains of an ancient fort.

François-René de Chateaubriand, a French writer native to Saint-Malo, is buried on the island, in a grave facing the sea.

== See also ==
- Petit Bé
