= Saint-Malo =

Saint-Malo Saent-Malô (Gallo) Sant-Maloù (Breton)
- Subprefecture and commune
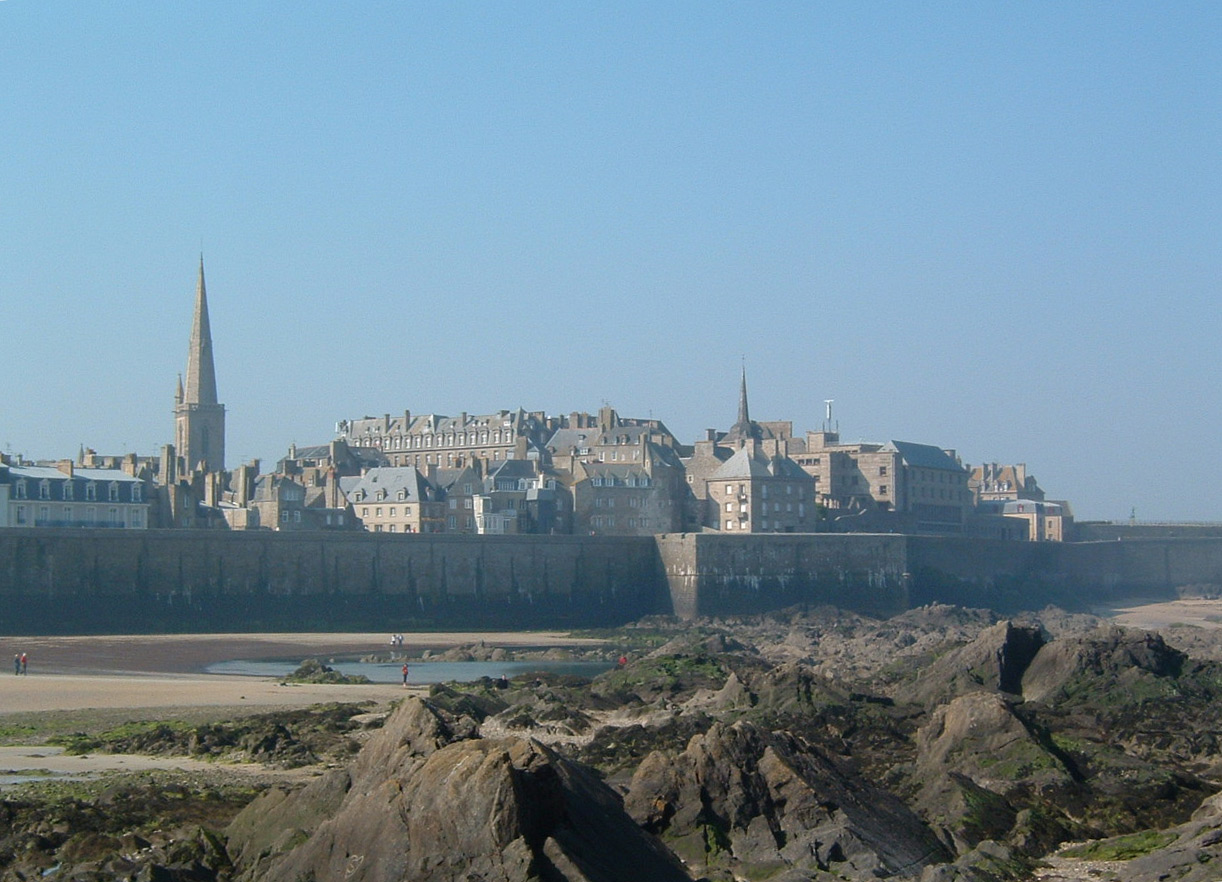
- Walled city of Saint-Malo from the north at low tide

- Flag Coat of arms
- Location of Saint-Malo
- Location within France Location within Brittany
- Coordinates: 48°38′58″N 2°01′34″W
- Country: France
- Region: Brittany
- Department: Ille-et-Vilaine
- Arrondissement: Saint-Malo
- Canton: Saint-Malo-1 and 2
- Intercommunality: CA Pays de Saint-Malo

Government
  - Mayor (2026–32): Gilles Lurton
- Area^{1}: 36.58 km^{2} (14.12 sq mi)
- Elevation: 8 m (26 ft)
- Highest elevation: 51 m (167 ft)
- Lowest elevation: 0 m (0 ft)
- Population (2023): 47,439
  - Density: 1,297/km^{2} (3,359/sq mi)
- Time zone: UTC+01:00 (CET)
  - Summer (DST): UTC+02:00 (CEST)
- INSEE/Postal code: 35288 /35400
- ^{1} French Land Register data, which excludes lakes, ponds, glaciers > 1 km^{2} (0.386 sq mi or 247 acres) and river estuaries.

Aerial view of the walled city

Saint-Malo (UK: /sæ̃ ˈmɑːloʊ/, US: /ˌsæ̃ məˈloʊ/, French: [sɛ̃ malo]; Gallo: Saent-Malô; Breton: Sant-Maloù) is a historic French port commune in Ille-et-Vilaine, Brittany.

Originally, the walled city sat on a rocky granite island connected to the mainland only by a natural, narrow sand spit and tidal mudflats called le Sillon. Stonework and a basic road were first established along this sandbar in 1509 to protect the area and create dry access. The original structure was widened, raised, and rebuilt over the centuries — particularly in the 19th century — to form the modern dyke and thoroughfare (La Digue du Sillon) that permanently connects the old town to the rest of the coast.

The walled city on the English Channel coast has a long history of piracy, earning much wealth from local extortion and overseas adventures. In 1944, during World War II, the Allies heavily bombed Saint-Malo. The city became a popular tourist centre, with a ferry terminal serving the Channel Islands of Jersey and Guernsey, as well as the Southern English settlements of Portsmouth, Hampshire and Poole, Dorset.

The transatlantic single-handed yacht race Route du Rhum, which takes place every four years in November, is between Saint Malo and Pointe-à-Pitre in Guadeloupe.

== Population ==
The population in 2023 was 47,439 – though this can increase to up to 300,000 in the summer tourist season. With the suburbs included, the metropolitan area's population is approximately 138,000 (2022).

The population of the commune more than doubled in 1967 with the merging of three communes: Saint-Malo, Saint-Servan (population 14,963 in 1962) and Paramé (population 8,811 in 1962).

Inhabitants of Saint-Malo are called Malouins in French. The population data in the table and graph below refer to the commune of Saint-Malo proper in its geography for the given years.

Historical population

Year	Pop.	±% p.a.
1793	10,730	—
1800	9,147	−2.25%
1806	9,934	+1.39%
1821	9,949	+0.01%
1831	9,981	+0.03%
1836	9,744	−0.48%
1841	10,053	+0.63%
1846	10,076	+0.05%
1851	9,997	−0.16%
1856	10,809	+1.57%
1861	10,886	+0.14%
1866	10,693	−0.36%
1872	12,316	+2.38%
1876	10,295	−4.38%
1881	11,212	+1.72%
1886	10,500	−1.30%
1891	11,896	+2.53%
1896	11,476	−0.72%
1901	11,486	+0.02%

Year	Pop.	±% p.a.
1906	10,647	−1.51%
1911	12,371	+3.05%
1921	12,390	+0.02%
1926	13,137	+1.18%
1931	12,864	−0.42%
1936	13,836	+1.47%
1946	11,311	−1.99%
1954	14,339	+3.01%
1962	17,137	+2.25%
1968	42,297	+16.25%
1975	45,030	+0.90%
1982	46,347	+0.41%
1990	48,057	+0.45%
1999	50,675	+0.59%
2007	48,563	−0.53%
2012	44,620	−1.68%
2017	46,097	+0.65%
2023	47,439	+0.48%

Source: EHESS and INSEE (1968-2023)

== History ==
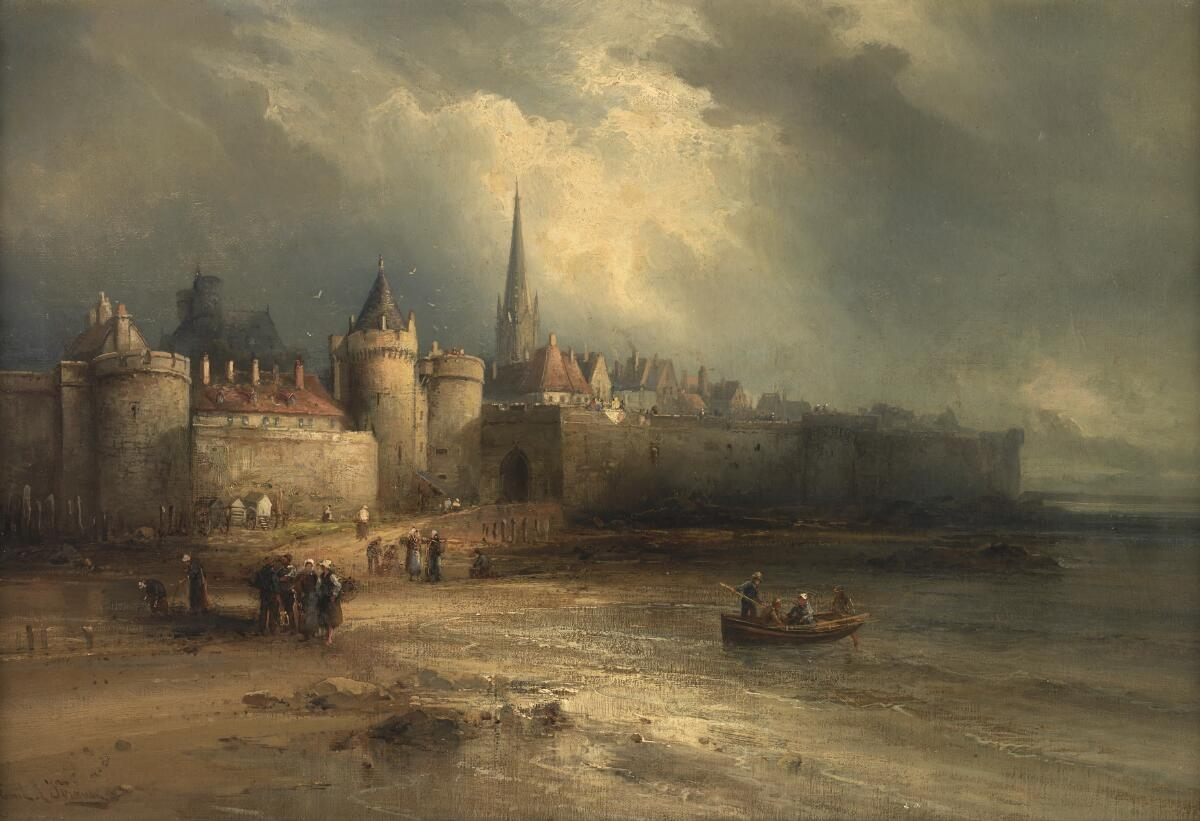
St Malo, painted c. 1900 by Emil Krause

=== Before World War II ===
Founded by Gauls in the 1st century BC, the ancient town on the site of Saint-Malo was known as the Roman Reginca or Aletum. By the late 4th century AD, the Saint-Servan district was the site of a major Saxon Shore promontory fort that protected the Rance estuary from seaborne raiders from beyond the frontiers. According to the Notitia Dignitatum, the fort was garrisoned by the militum Martensium under a dux (commander) of the Tractus Armoricanus et Nervicanus section of the litus Saxonicum. During the decline of the Western Roman Empire, Armorica (modern-day Brittany) rebelled from Roman rule under the Bagaudae and in the 5th and 6th centuries received many Celtic Britons fleeing instability across the Channel. The modern Saint-Malo traces its origins to a monastic settlement founded by Saint Aaron and Saint Brendan early in the sixth century. Its name is derived from a man said to have been a follower of Brendan the Navigator, Saint Malo or Maclou, an immigrant from what is now Wales.

Saint-Malo is the setting of Marie de France's poem "Laüstic", a 12th-century love story. The city had a tradition of asserting its autonomy in dealings with the French authorities and even with the local Breton authorities.

From 1590 to 1594, Saint-Malo declared itself to be an independent republic, when "la république de Saint-Malo" (Saint Malo Republic) functioned as a de facto city-state, and from whence the town takes its defiant motto "not French, not Breton, but Malouin" ("Ni Français, ni Breton, Malouin suis").

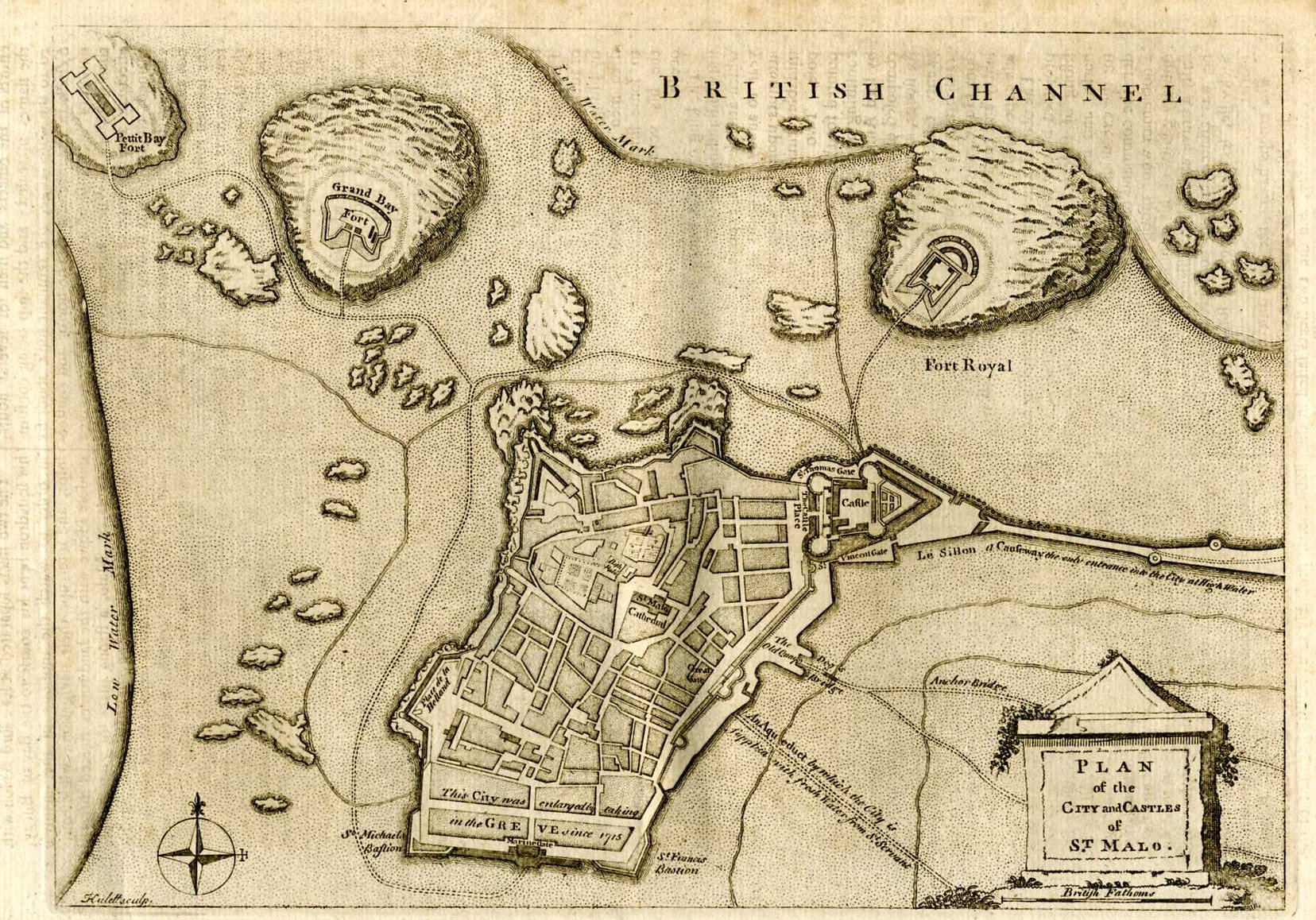
Old map of Saint-Malo

Saint-Malo became notorious as the home of the corsairs, French privateers and sometimes pirates. In the 19th century, this "piratical" notoriety was portrayed in Jean Richepin's play Le flibustier and in César Cui's eponymous opera. The corsairs of Saint-Malo not only forced English ships passing up the Channel to pay tribute but also brought wealth from further afield. Jacques Cartier lived in, and sailed from, Saint-Malo to the Saint Lawrence River, visiting the villages of Stadacona and Hochelaga that would later become the sites of present-day Quebec City and Montreal respectively. As the first European to encounter these sites and learning the local word "Kanata" (meaning a group of houses), Cartier is credited as the discoverer of Canada.

Inhabitants of Saint-Malo are called Malouins in French. From this came the Spanish name Islas Malvinas for the Falklands. Islas Malvinas derives from the 1764 name Îles Malouines, given to the islands by French explorer Louis-Antoine de Bougainville. Bougainville, who founded the archipelago's first settlement, named the islands after the inhabitants of Saint-Malo, the point of departure for his ships and colonists.

In 1758, the Raid on Saint-Malo saw a British expedition land, intending to capture the town. However, the British made no attempt on Saint-Malo and instead occupied the nearby town of Saint-Servan, where they destroyed 30 privateers before departing.

The history of Saint-Malo and its character in the 1770s is depicted by Francois-Rene de Chateaubriand, born there in 1768, in his Memoirs from Beyond the Grave.

=== World War II ===
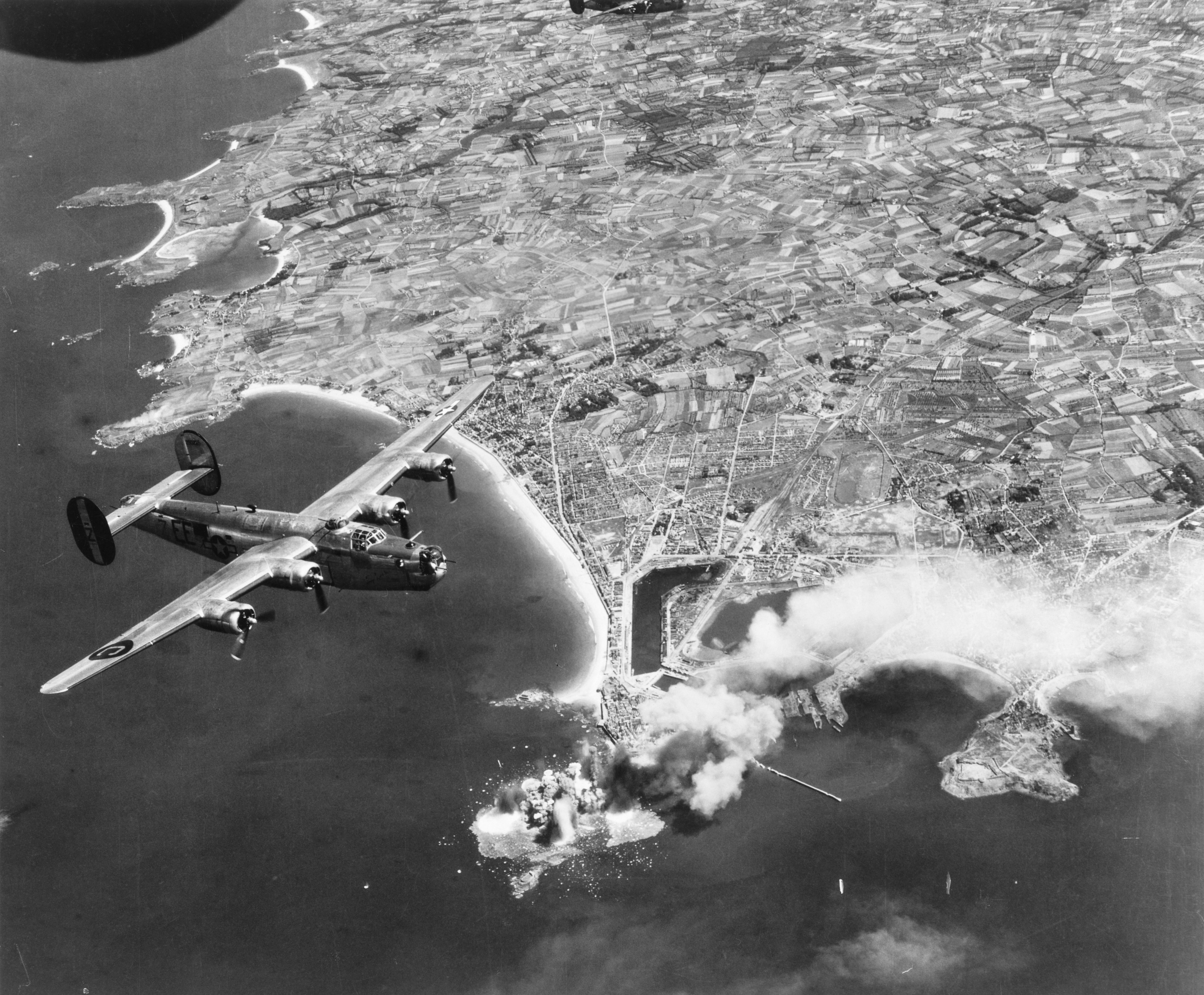
An air raid on Saint-Malo during August 1944

In World War II, during fighting in late August and early September 1944, the historic walled city of Saint-Malo was almost totally destroyed by American shelling and bombing. The beaches of nearby Dinard had been heavily fortified against possible Allied commando raids. Artillery at the two locations provided mutual support. The fortification complex was garrisoned by more than twelve thousand German troops from different services and units as well as stragglers from other battles in the Cotentin. About eight thousand Germans were in Saint-Malo itself when the battle began.

Colonel Andreas von Aulock, the German commander, refused to surrender when asked to do so by the town's authorities. He said he "would defend St. Malo to the last man even if the last man had to be himself".

The first American attack was launched by the 83rd Infantry Division on 5 August 1944. German positions at Châteauneuf quickly fell. Cancale was abandoned and occupied by the Americans on the 6th. In the same way and on the same day, Dinan fell to Free French forces. The Germans shortened their lines and drew closer to the ancient citadel at St. Servan-sur-Mer, now reinforced with concrete.

Effective German artillery emplacements on the island of Cezembre were out of reach of American ground forces. German garrisons on the Channel Islands of Jersey, Guernsey, and Alderney were able to use small craft to bring in water and remove the wounded from the battle.

On 13 August, the walled city was on fire and a short truce was declared to allow French civilians to flee the city. Outlying German positions at St. Ideuc and La Varde fell to infantry attacks. This fighting ended resistance on the north shore of the peninsula. Only the citadel remained. Surrounded by American artillery and under frequent air attack, this last holdout surrendered on the afternoon of 17 August.

Cezembre surrendered on 2 September when the three-hundred-man garrison ran out of drinking water. The Americans had taken more than ten thousand prisoners during the two-week fight, von Aulock among them.

=== Post-war ===
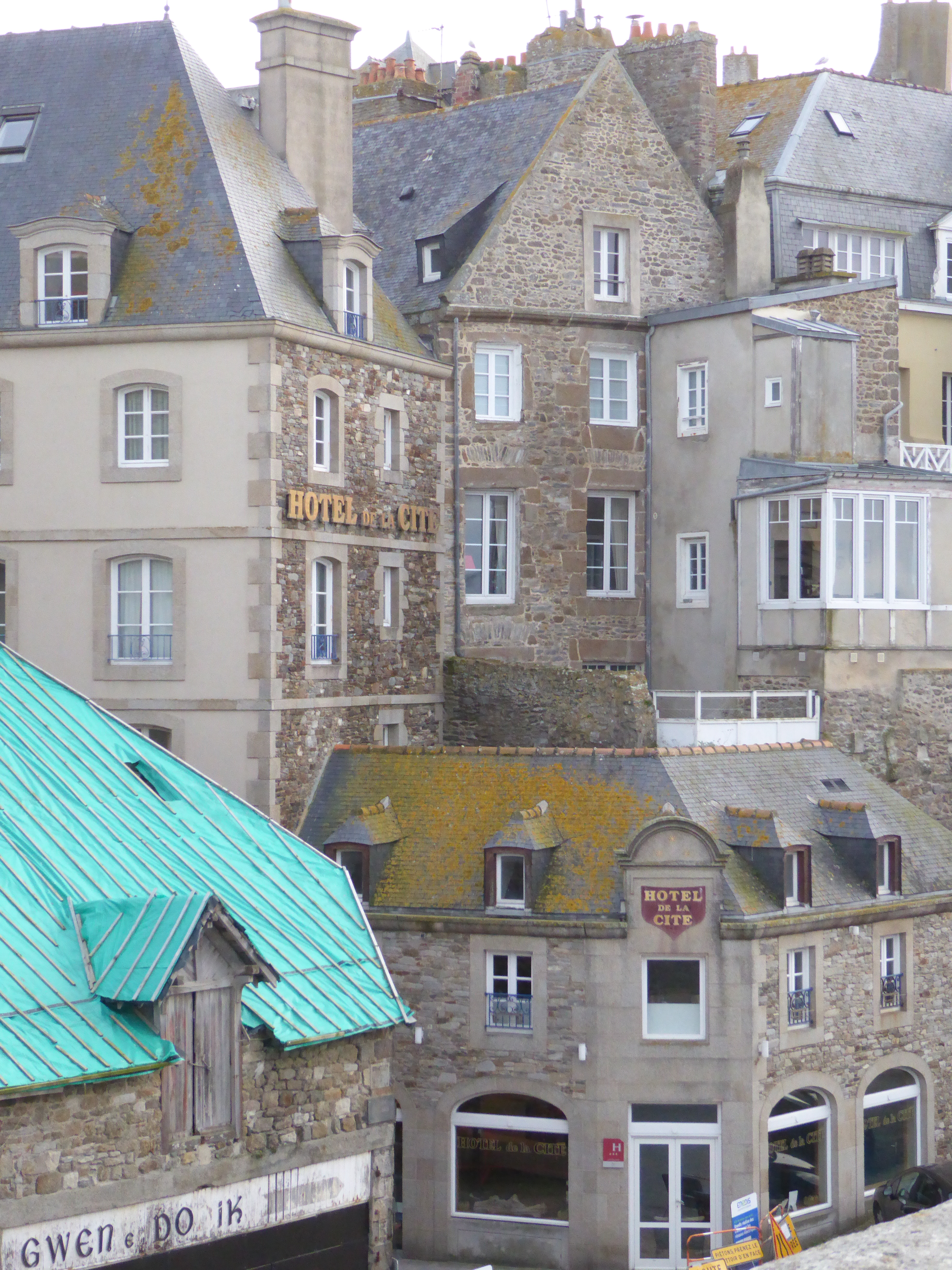
Saint-Malo in 2024, within the medieval walled city

Saint-Malo was rebuilt over a 12-year period from 1948 to 1960.

It is a subprefecture of the Ille-et-Vilaine. The commune of Saint-Servan was merged with Paramé, and became the commune of Saint-Malo in 1967.

Saint-Malo was the site of an Anglo-French summit in 1998 that led to a significant agreement regarding European defence policy.

== Climate ==
The Gulf of Saint-Malo has an oceanic temperate climate. Temperatures are softened by the Gulf Stream and the range of average temperatures between winter and summer is very low (from 6.1 °C in January to 17.8 °C in August) with an average temperature of 11.6 °C.

Climate data for Saint-Malo (Dinard) (1991–2020 normals, extremes 1950–present)
Month	Jan	Feb	Mar	Apr	May	Jun	Jul	Aug	Sep	Oct	Nov	Dec	Year
Record high °C (°F)	16.4 (61.5)	20.9 (69.6)	23.7 (74.7)	27.1 (80.8)	29.2 (84.6)	35.5 (95.9)	40.0 (104.0)	39.4 (102.9)	33.1 (91.6)	28.9 (84.0)	20.6 (69.1)	17.6 (63.7)	40.0 (104.0)
Mean daily maximum °C (°F)	9.1 (48.4)	9.8 (49.6)	12.2 (54.0)	14.5 (58.1)	17.3 (63.1)	20.2 (68.4)	22.1 (71.8)	22.3 (72.1)	20.3 (68.5)	16.5 (61.7)	12.4 (54.3)	9.7 (49.5)	15.5 (59.9)
Daily mean °C (°F)	6.5 (43.7)	6.7 (44.1)	8.5 (47.3)	10.3 (50.5)	13.2 (55.8)	16.0 (60.8)	17.8 (64.0)	18.0 (64.4)	16.0 (60.8)	13.1 (55.6)	9.5 (49.1)	6.9 (44.4)	11.9 (53.4)
Mean daily minimum °C (°F)	3.8 (38.8)	3.6 (38.5)	4.9 (40.8)	6.2 (43.2)	9.1 (48.4)	11.8 (53.2)	13.6 (56.5)	13.7 (56.7)	11.8 (53.2)	9.7 (49.5)	6.5 (43.7)	4.2 (39.6)	8.2 (46.8)
Record low °C (°F)	−13.7 (7.3)	−11.7 (10.9)	−6.2 (20.8)	−2.8 (27.0)	−0.2 (31.6)	3.6 (38.5)	6.7 (44.1)	5.0 (41.0)	2.3 (36.1)	−4.2 (24.4)	−5.9 (21.4)	−9.6 (14.7)	−13.7 (7.3)
Average precipitation mm (inches)	64.0 (2.52)	56.0 (2.20)	47.6 (1.87)	53.9 (2.12)	56.0 (2.20)	54.1 (2.13)	46.1 (1.81)	58.3 (2.30)	60.2 (2.37)	81.3 (3.20)	89.0 (3.50)	85.5 (3.37)	752.0 (29.61)
Average precipitation days (≥ 1.0 mm)	11.8	11.3	10.1	10.4	9.0	8.4	7.6	9.0	9.4	13.1	14.0	13.8	127.9
Average snowy days	1.7	2.5	1.4	0.6	0.0	0.0	0.0	0.0	0.0	0.0	0.3	1.4	7.9
Average relative humidity (%)	84	81	79	79	79	81	81	81	82	85	84	85	81.8
Mean monthly sunshine hours	68.7	91.2	132.7	178.9	202.6	207.5	220.7	201.4	170.1	114.2	79.6	65.8	1,733.4
Source 1: Meteociel
Source 2: Infoclimat.fr (humidity, snowy days 1961–1990)

== Politics ==
Saint-Malo is part of Ille-et-Vilaine's 7th constituency, and is currently represented in the National Assembly by Republicans Member of Parliament, Jean-Luc Bourgeaux.

== Education ==
=== Schools ===
Schools include:

- 13 public preschools (écoles maternelles)
- 11 public elementary schools
- 8 private preschools and elementary schools
- 3 public collèges: Chateaubriand, Duguay-Trouin, and Charcot
- 3 private junior high schools: Choisy Jeanne d'Arc, Moka, and Sacré-Cœur
- 3 public senior high schools: Lycée Maupertuis, Lycée Jacques Cartier, Professional Maritime Lycée Les Rimains
- 2 private senior high schools: Lycée Institution Saint Malo-La Providence and Les Rimains

=== Higher education ===
- Institute of Technology of Saint-Malo
- A nurse school
- A maritime school

== Transport ==
Saint-Malo has a terminal for ferry services with daily departures to Portsmouth and on most days, departures to Poole via Guernsey, all operated by Brittany Ferries. DFDS Seaways operates a service most days to Jersey. It also has a railway station, Gare de Saint-Malo, offering direct TGV service to Rennes, Paris and several regional destinations. There is a bus service provided by Keolis. The town is served by the Dinard–Pleurtuit–Saint-Malo Airport around 5 kilometres (3 miles) to the south.

== Sites of interest ==
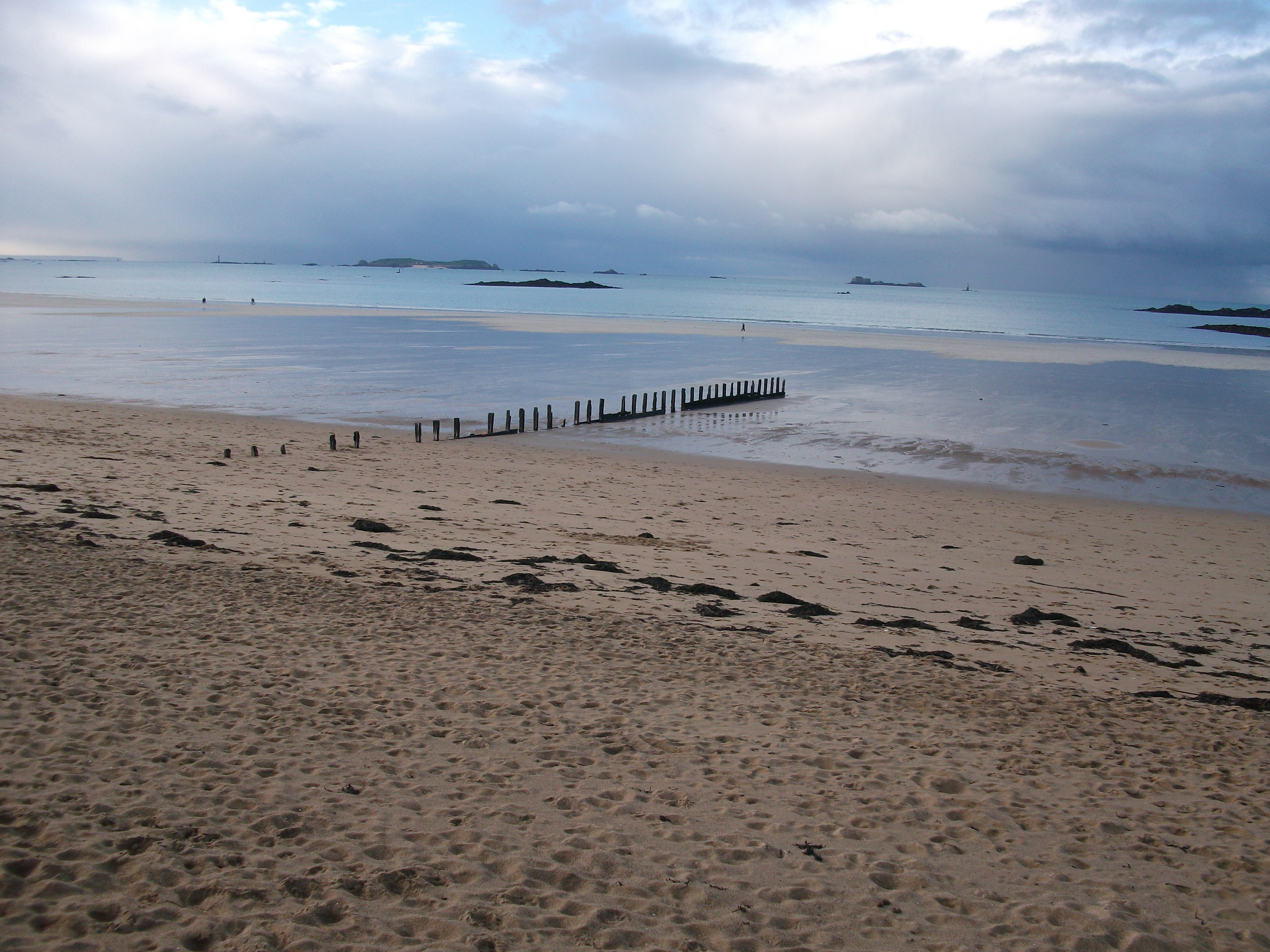
Beach at low tide in Saint-Malo

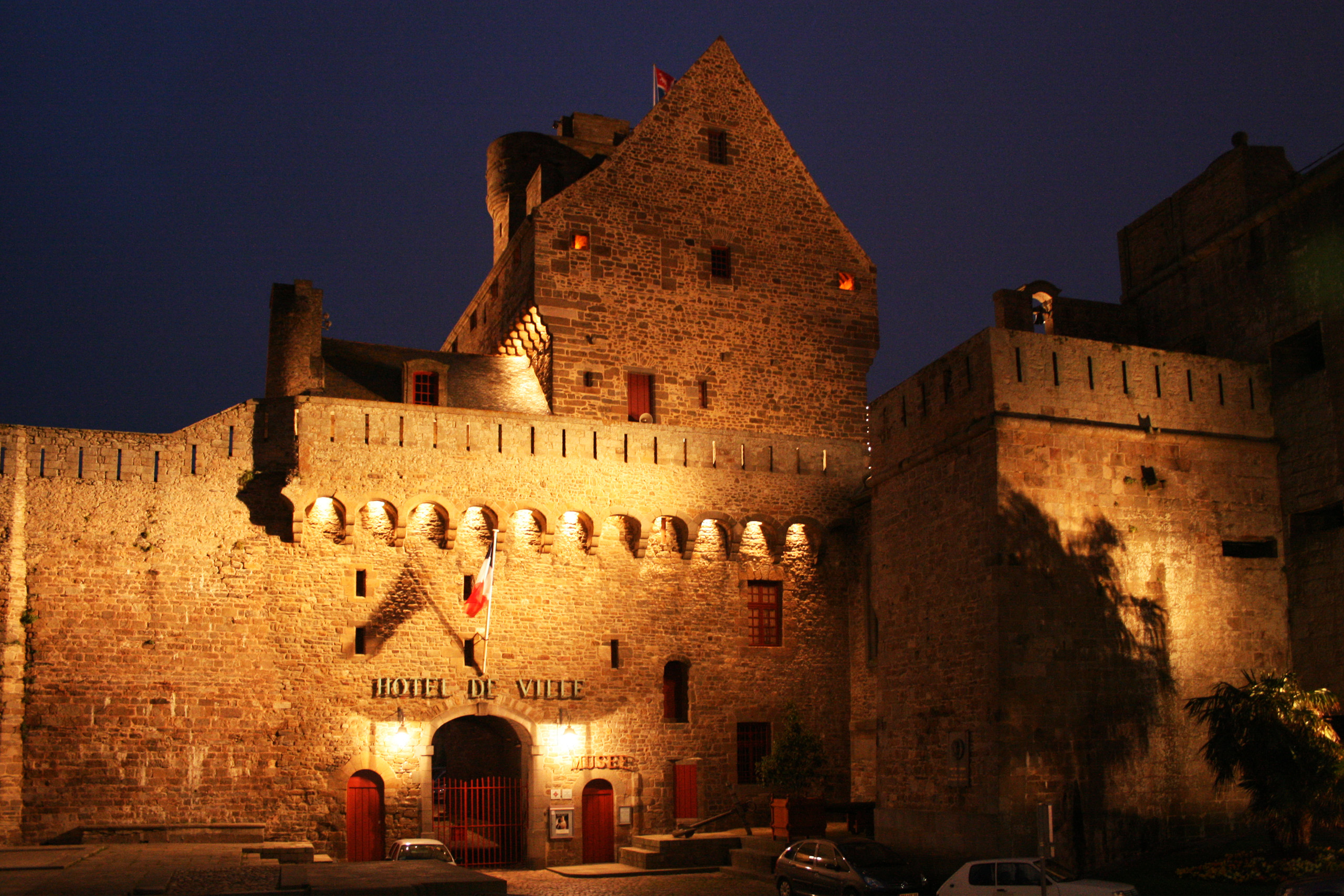
Château de Saint-Malo

Now inseparably attached to the mainland, Saint-Malo is the most visited place in Brittany. Sites of interest include:

- The walled city (La Ville Intra-Muros)
- The Château de Saint-Malo, part of which accommodates the town museum and the Hôtel de Ville (town hall)
- The Solidor Tower in Saint-Servan is a 14th-century building that holds a collection tracing the history of voyages around Cape Horn. Many scale models, nautical instruments and objects made by the sailors during their crossing or brought back from foreign ports invoke thoughts of travel aboard extraordinary tall ships at the end of the 19th and the beginning of the 20th century.
- The tomb of the writer Chateaubriand on the Ile du Grand Bé
- The Petit Bé
- The Cathedral of St. Vincent (Saint-Malo Cathedral)
- The Privateer's House ("La Demeure de Corsaire"), a ship-owner's town house built in 1725, shows objects from the history of privateering, weaponry and ship models.
- The Great Aquarium Saint-Malo, one of the major aquaria in France.
- The labyrinthe du Corsaire (an attraction park in Saint Malo)
- The Pointe de la Varde, Natural Park
- The City of Alet, in front of Saint Malo Intra Muros
- Fort National
- Fort de la Conchée
- Bon-Secours tidal swimming pool

== Panoramic photographs ==
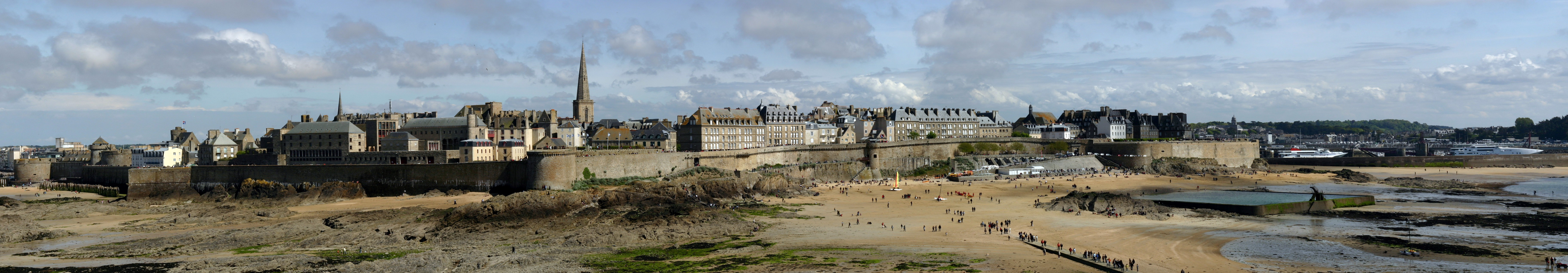
Panoramic view from the tidal island Grand Bé during low tide

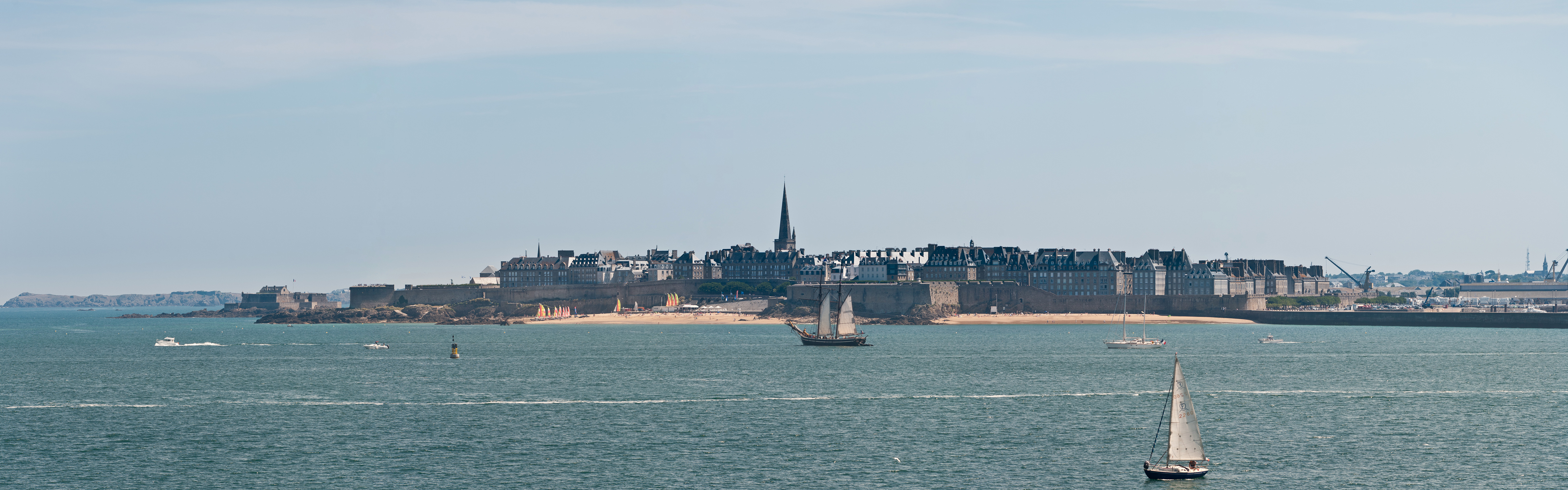
View of the walled city from the south-west

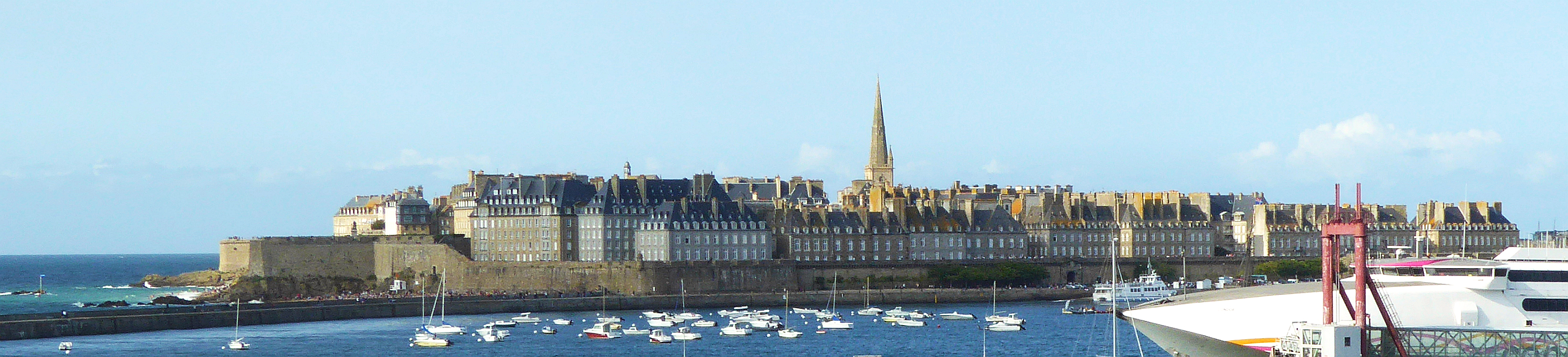
Panoramic view of the old walled city with bastion St. Philippe (left) and cathedrale St Vincent from the south

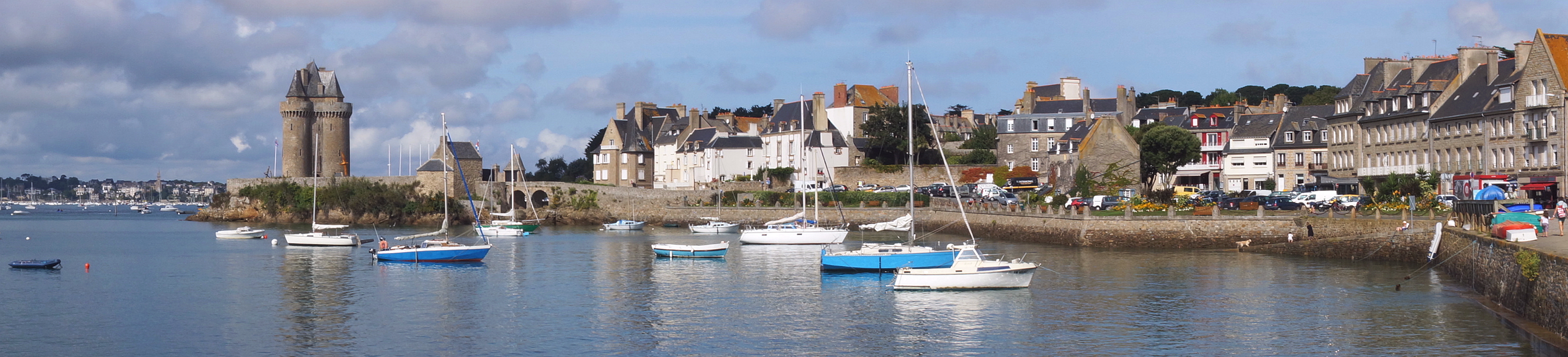
Panoramic view of La Cité, Cap-Hornier, les Corbières at the Quai Sébastopol from the south

== Notable people ==
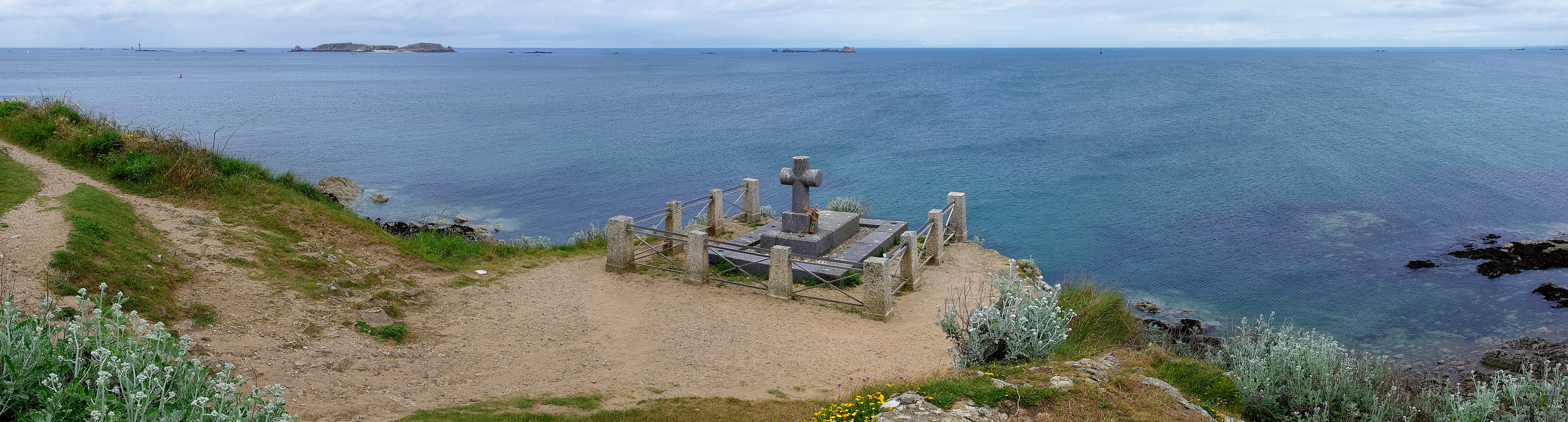
François-René de Chateaubriand's grave, on Rocher du Grand Bé

Saint-Malo was the birthplace of:

- Jacques Cartier (1491–1557), explorer of Canada
- Jacques Gouin de Beauchene (1652–1730), explorer of the Falkland Islands
- René Duguay-Trouin (1673–1736), French corsair and Admiral who captured the city of Rio de Janeiro in 1711
- Pierre Louis Moreau de Maupertuis (1698–1759), mathematician and astronomer
- Bertrand-François Mahé de La Bourdonnais (1699–1753), sailor and administrator
- Julien Offray de La Mettrie (1709–1751), physician and philosopher
- Marc-Joseph Marion du Fresne (1724–1772), explorer
- Joseph Quesnel (1746–1809), Canadian poet, composer and playwright
- Louis de Grandpré (1761–1846), French Navy officer and slave trader
- François-René de Chateaubriand (1768–1848), writer and diplomat
- Robert Surcouf (1773–1827), sailor, trader, ship-owner and corsair
- Hughes Felicité Robert de Lamennais (1782–1854), priest, philosophical and political writer
- Jean-Marie Duhamel (1797–1872), mathematician and physicist
- Louis Duchesne (1843–1922), historian, French academician
- Marie Bérenger (1865–1944), French Resistance activist who opposed the Nazi occupation of France
- Louis Bachelier (1870–1946), mathematician
- Alfred Blunt (1879–1957), Anglican Bishop of Bradford, England, was born at St Malo of British expatriate parents and brought up there until the family returned to England in 1887.
- Pierre Allory - Rev Brother Maurice (1884–1988) of the Brothers of Christian Instruction, teacher and highly decorated during WWI in Medical Corp
- Philippe Cattiau (1892–1962), Olympic medalist in fencing
- Colin Clive (1900–1937), actor
- Jean Lebrun (born 1950), journalist and radio producer
- Agnès Martin-Lugand (born 1979), best-seller novelist
- Franck Mailleux (born 1985), racing driver

== Twin towns – sister cities ==
Saint-Malo is twinned with:

- Port-Louis, Mauritius (1999)
- (Canada) Gaspé, Quebec (2009)
- (Canada) Saint-Malo, Quebec
- (Canada) St. Malo, Manitoba
- Cowes, Isle of Wight, United Kingdom
- Gniezno, Poland

== In popular culture ==
Saint-Malo is one of the main settings in the 2014 Pulitzer Prize-winning novel All the Light We Cannot See by Anthony Doerr, and was a filming location for the Netflix miniseries of the same name.

== Gallery ==
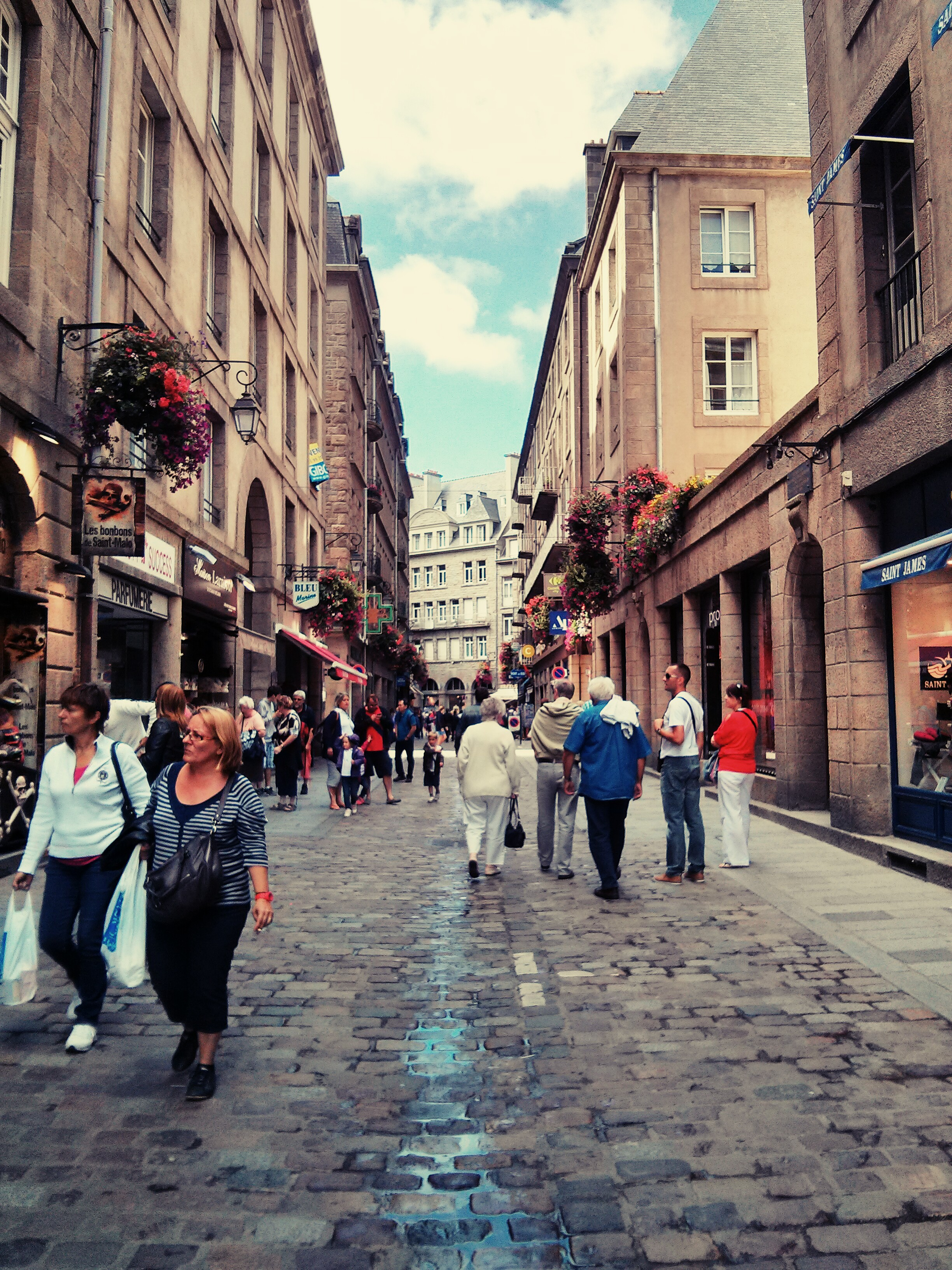
Rue Saint-Vincent

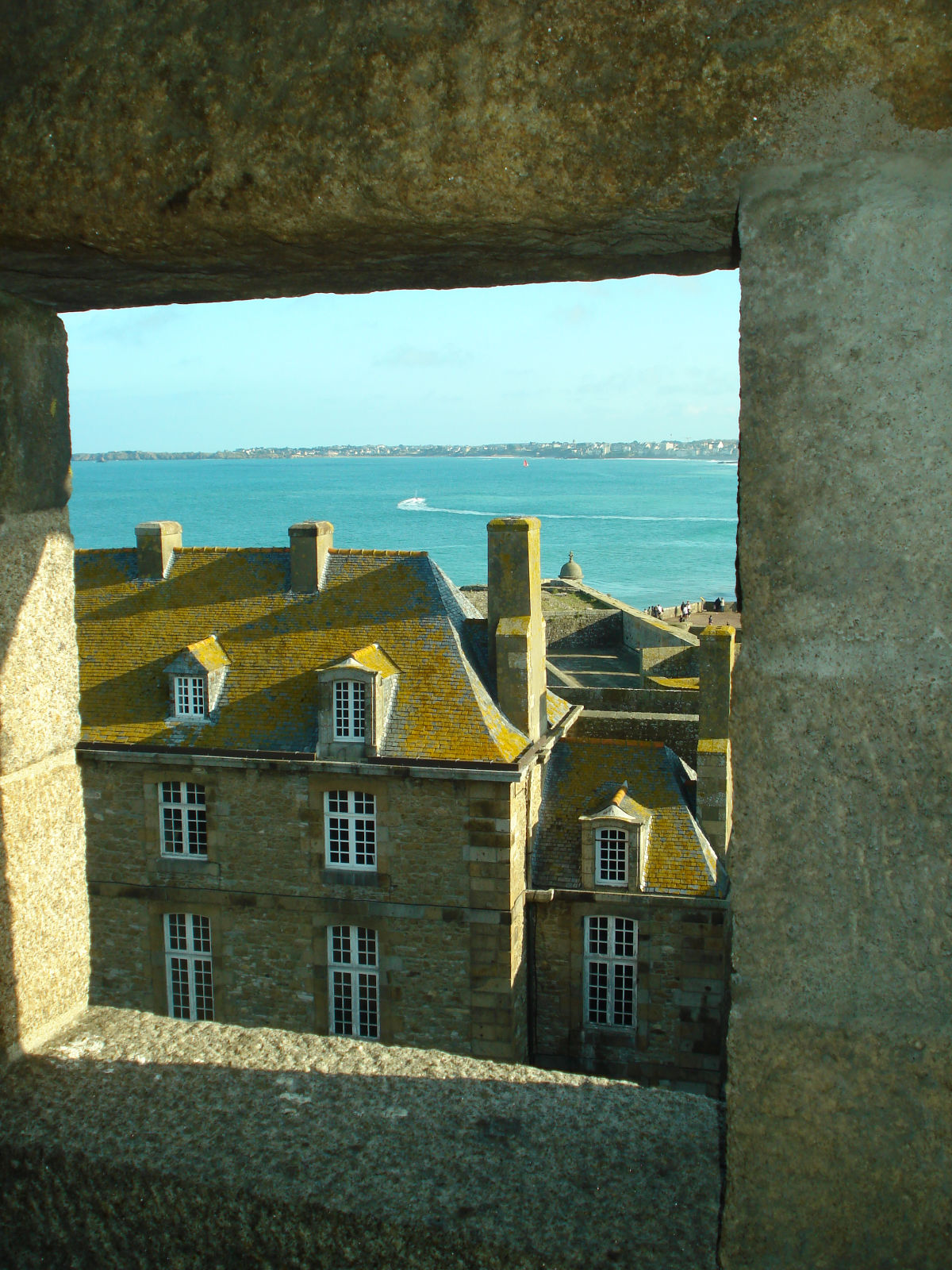
From the fort of Saint-Malo

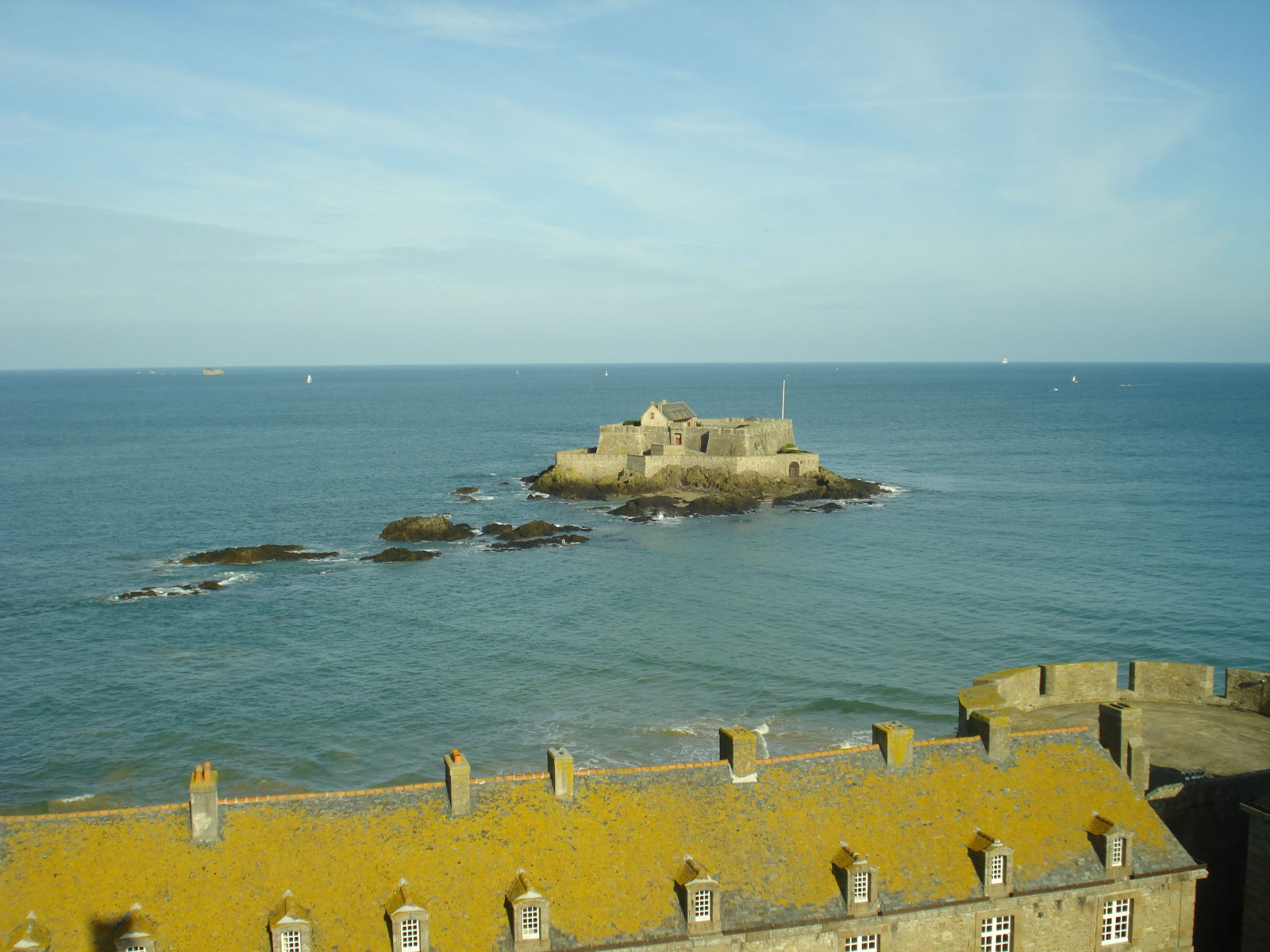
The "Fort National" visible from Saint-Malo

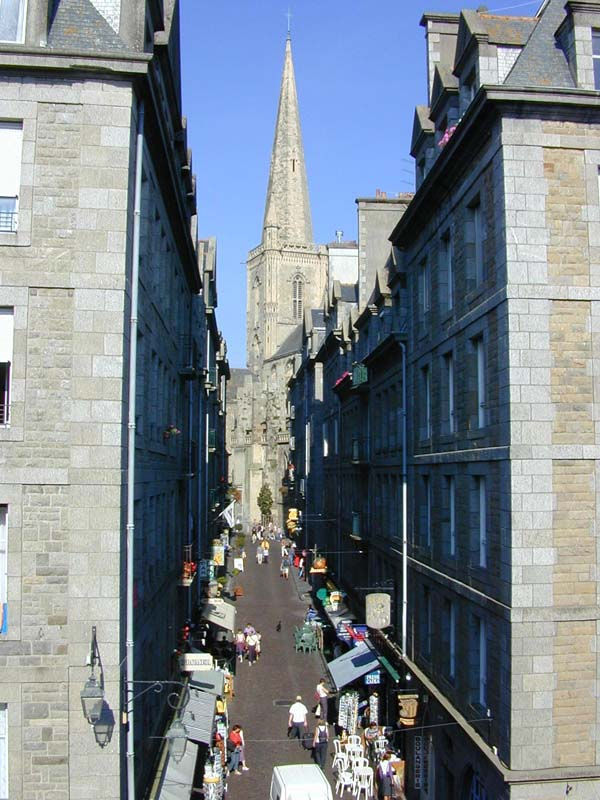
View up a typical city street towards the cathedral

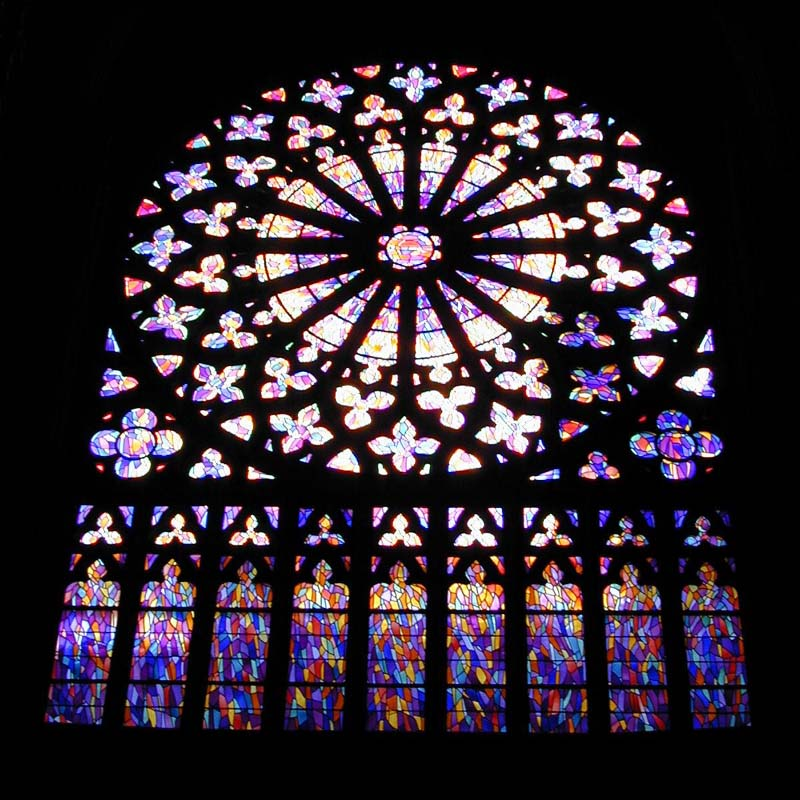
Cathedral window

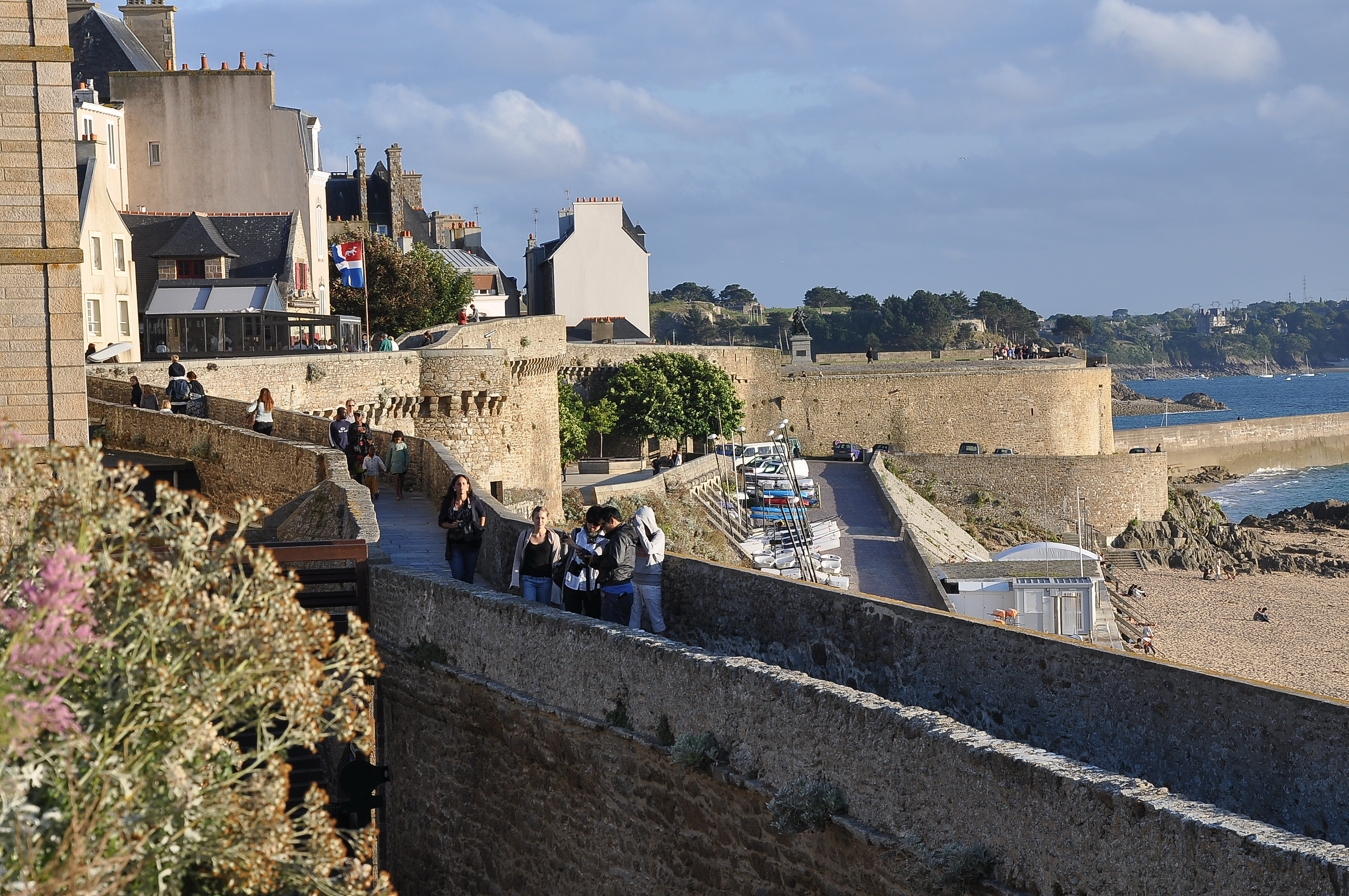
The city wall of St Malo.

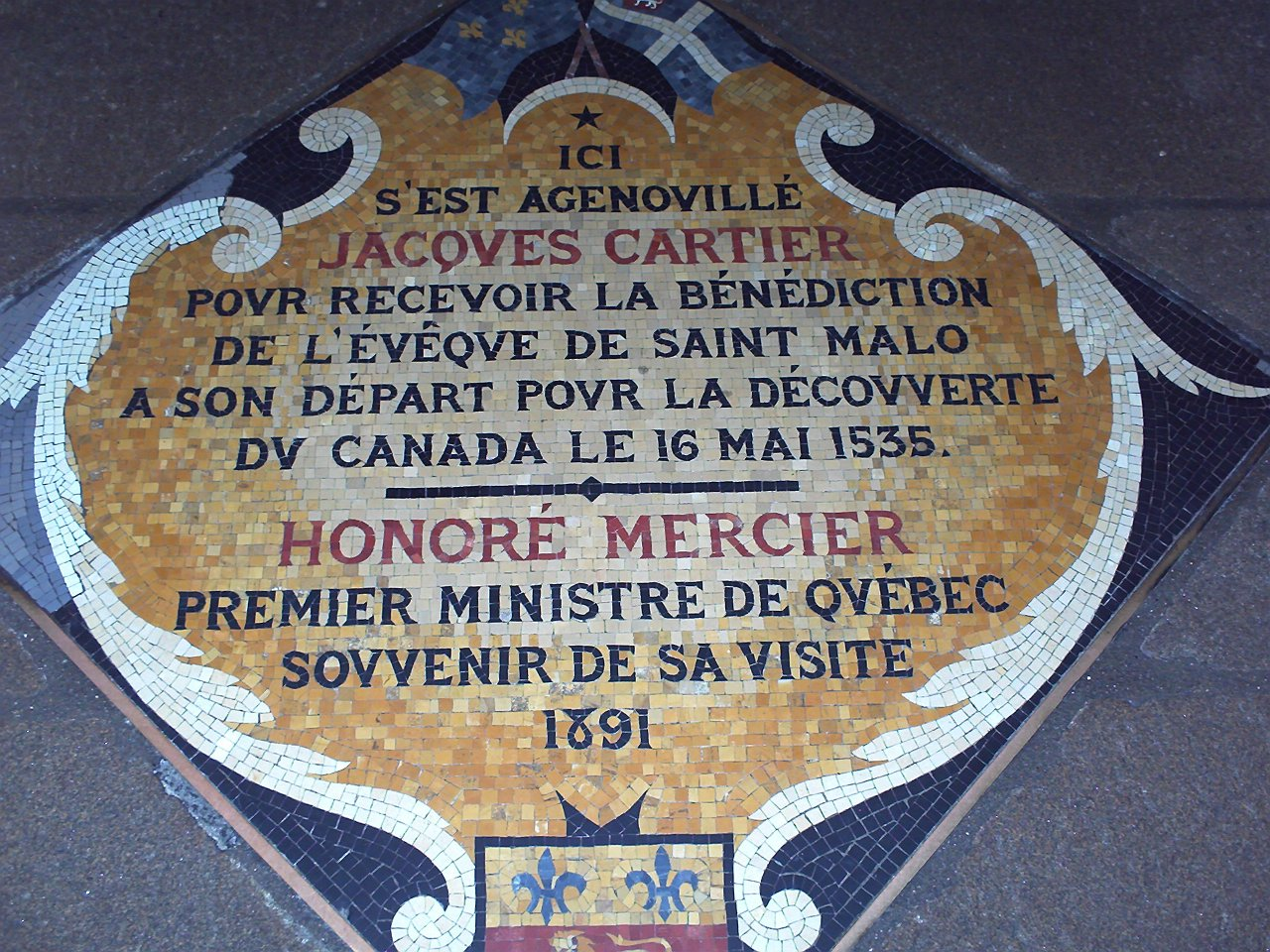
Commemoration of the Cartier expedition in the floor of the cathedral

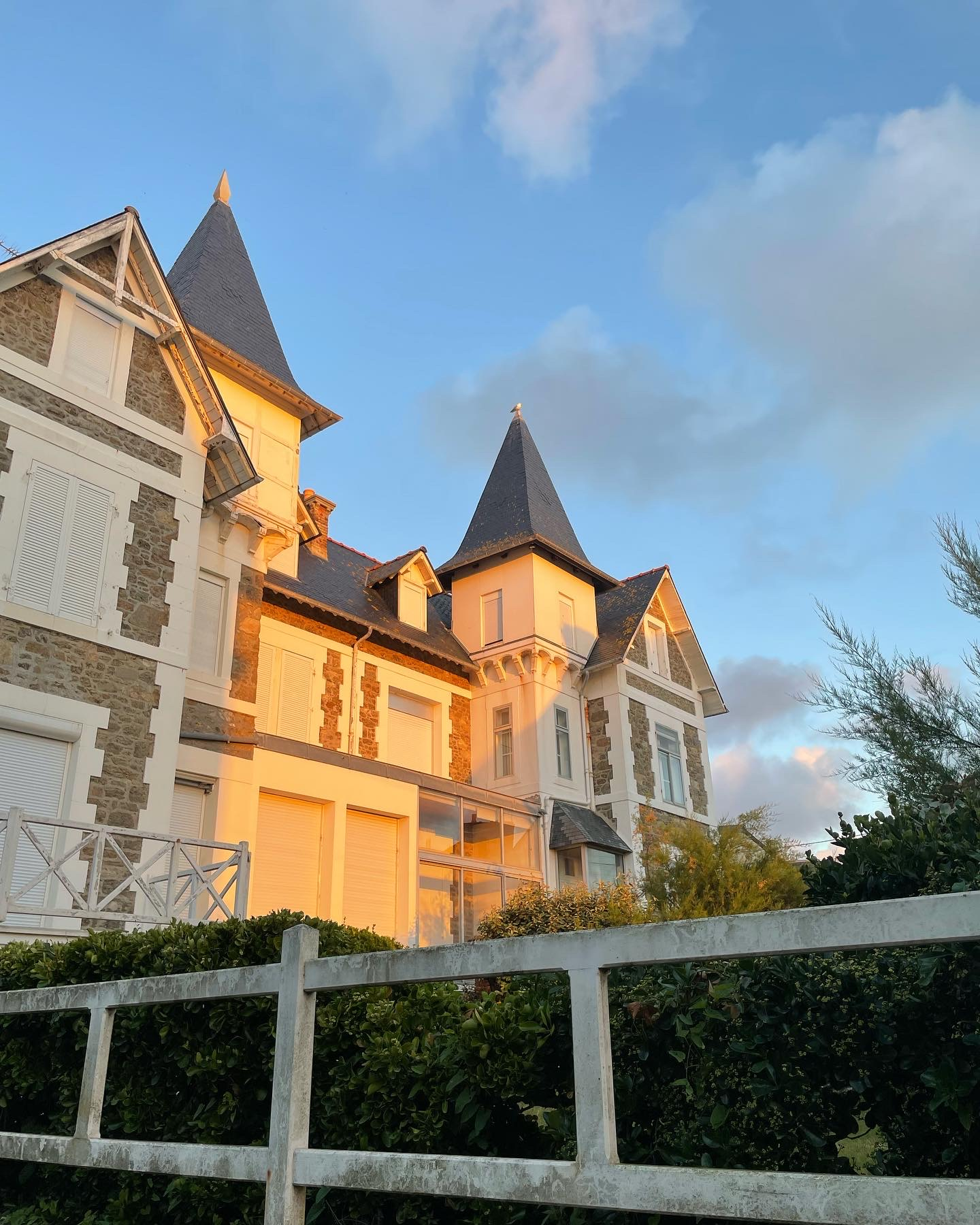
Houses in Saint-Malo

== See also ==
- Battle for Brest
- Jean-Marie Valentin
- Mont Saint-Michel
- Robert Surcouf
- Rothéneuf
- Shipwrecks of Saint Malo
