= Fort National =

Fort on a tidal island a few hundred metres off the walled city of Saint-Malo

Coordinates: 48°39′17″N 2°01′24″W

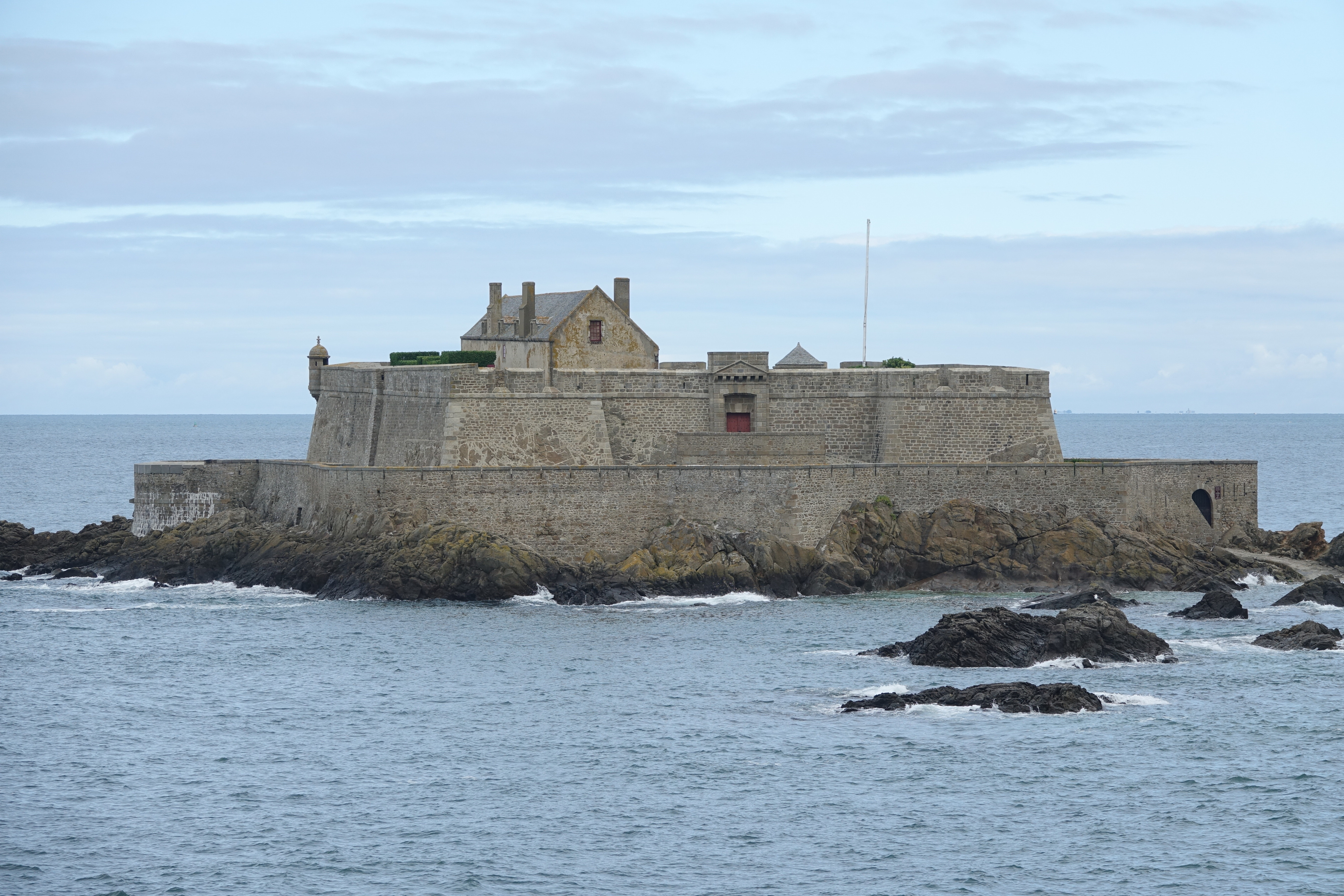
Fort National, Saint-Malo, at high tide

Fort National, Saint-Malo, not at high tide

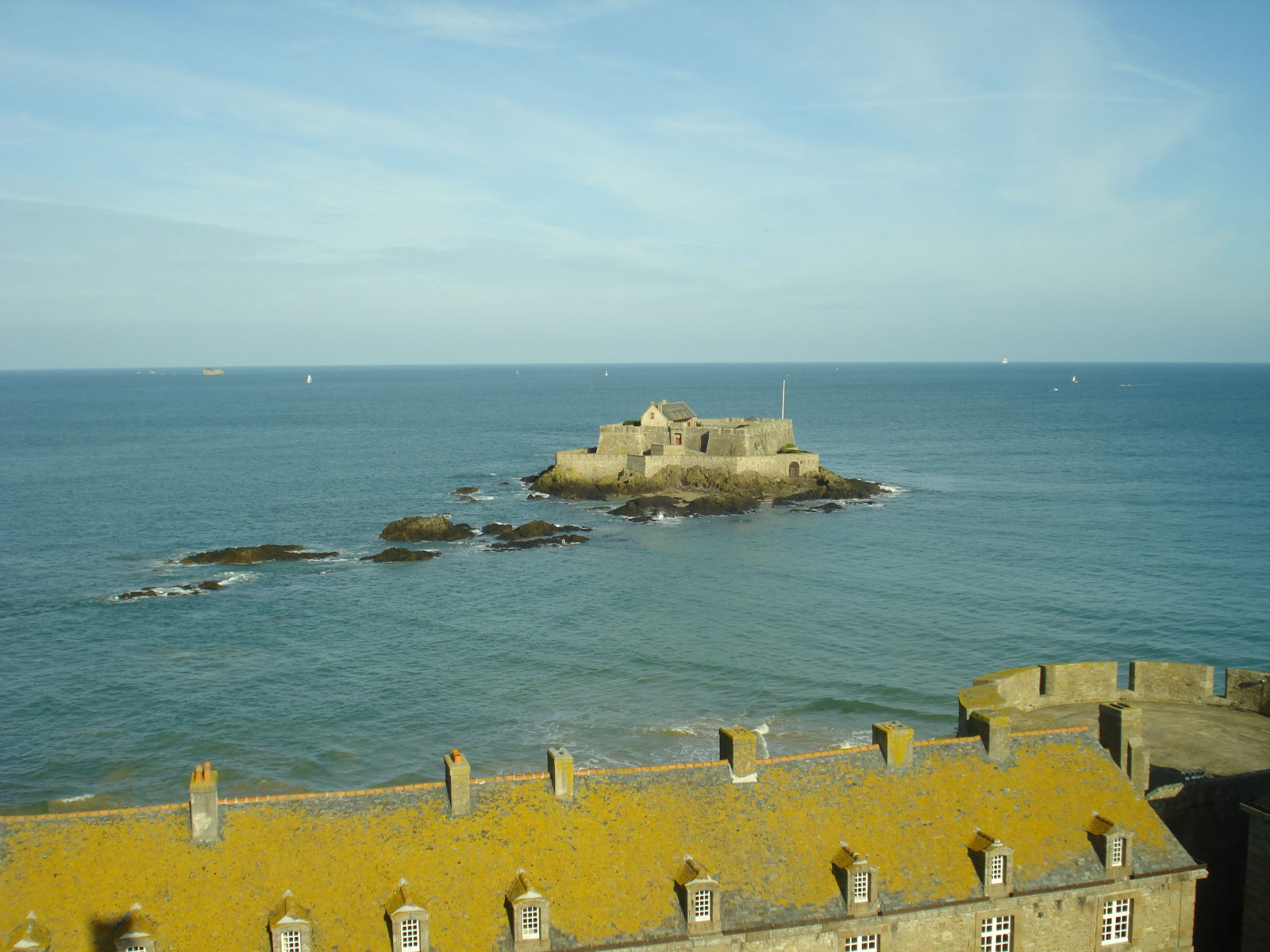
Fort National, seen from Saint-Malo.

Fort National is a fort on a tidal island a few hundred metres off the walled city of Saint-Malo. The great military architect Vauban had it built in 1689 to protect Saint-Malo's port.

The fort was originally called Fort Royal. In 1789 the fort's name became Fort d'Îlette or Républicain, then Fort Impérial and, after 1870, Fort National.

== History ==
=== Origins ===
The fort stands on l'Îlette rock. This was originally the site of a beacon that was lit at night to act as a lighthouse. Îlette was also a place of public executions for the seigniory of Saint Malo, which burnt criminals there. Later a gallows occupied the site. A model in Saint-Malo's history museum suggests that a battery may have occupied the site before the erection of the Vauban fort.

=== Vauban ===
The engineer Siméon Garangeau built the fort following Vauban's plans, and on the orders of King Louis XIV. Construction seems to have taken from 1689 to 1693. The fort augmented the defences of the city, and was part of a chain of fortifications that stretched from Fort-la-Latte to Pointe de la Varde.

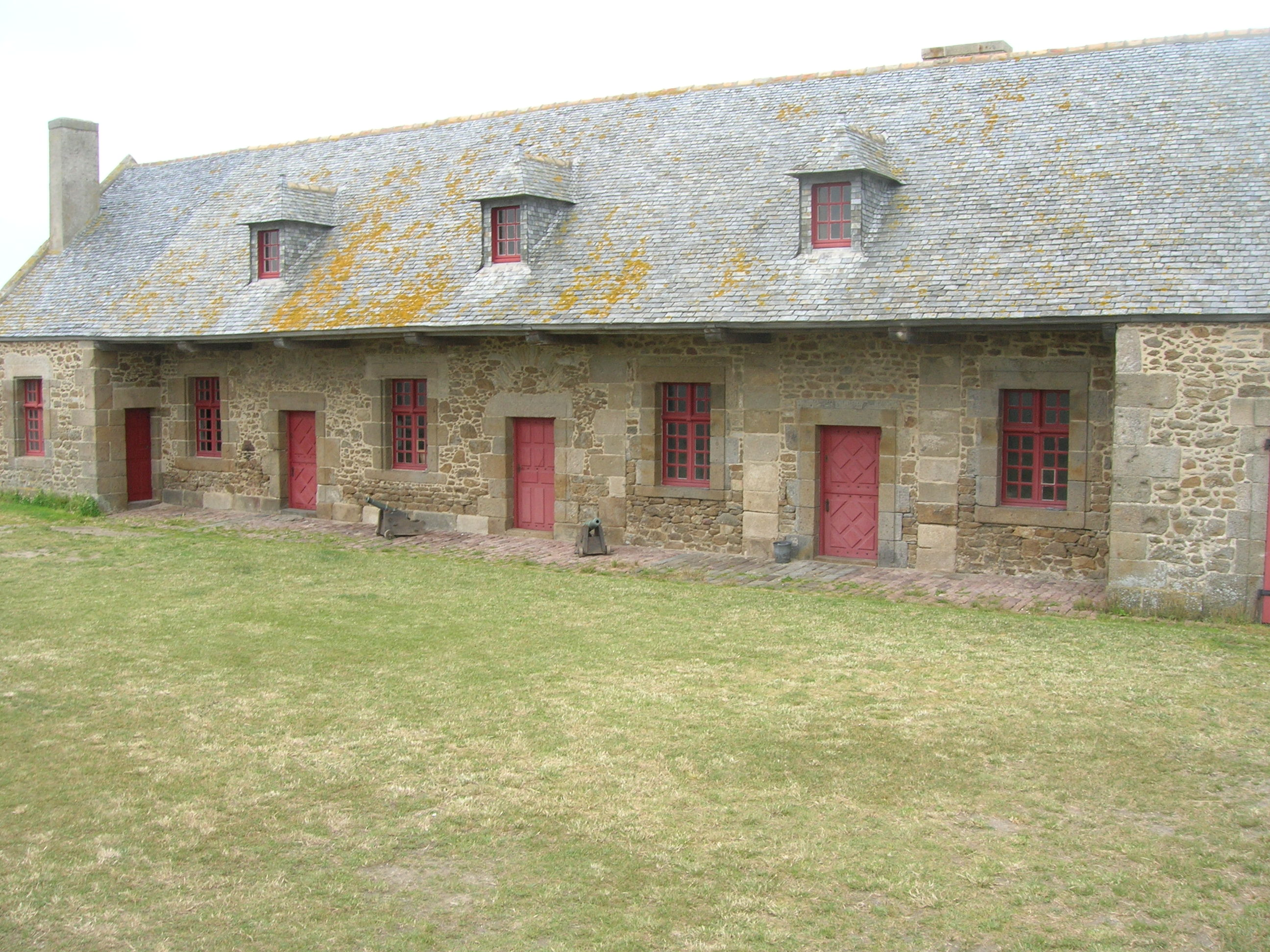
Barracks building

The original fort was a rectangle, built of granite, with two half bastions at the south, protecting the gate. A drawbridge gave access across a dry moat. Inside the fort there is a long building that contained quarters for the officer and troops, and equipment rooms.

=== Anglo-Dutch attack ===
On 26 November 1693, a fleet of 30 English and Dutch ships appeared off Cap Fréhel. They cannonaded Fort-la-Latte and Ébihens island, and then sailed towards Saint Malo. Three days later, the Anglo-Dutch force captured Fort de la Conchée and Cézembre island. For their attack on Saint Malo the English had brought a vessel packed with gunpowder to use as a floating mine against the city's defences, but it ran aground short of its target. The crew of the vessel were able to set off their bomb, but it was too far from its target to do any harm.

At the time, the fort was armed with 14 guns on marine carriages and three mortars. (Other accounts suggest that the fort originally had 23 guns, with the mortars being added in 1704.)

The fort contains an underground cistern with a capacity of 50,000 liters, fed by gutters, and accessible both by a trapdoor and a well. The garrison held its ammunition in an underground bomb-proof magazine with a vaulted ceiling. Angled apertures provided light and air.

=== Later developments ===
In 1848 the government added a wall pierced for small arms that encircled about three-quarters of the fort. The wall was intended to protect the fort against infantry attack from the land or by troops landed on the rocks on which the fort stands. The engineers also added a small bastion in front of the gate. This gave the fort a total area of about 4000 square metres.

In 1906 the fort received recognition as an historic building. However, in 1927 the government sold the fort to a private buyer.

=== World War II ===
The German army took control of the French coast from Cap Frehel to Saint-Malo by the end of June 1940. In 1942, work on fortifying Saint-Malo sped up as Hitler's Atlantic Wall project took form.

On 6 August 1944, the allies bombed Saint-Malo, which was still under German occupation. The next day the German commander imprisoned 380 men from St. Malo in the fort as hostages. The prisoners remained there for six days, where allied shellfire killed 18 of them on the night of 9 to 10 August. Food ran out on 11 August, and on 13 August, 150 old men and women joined the existing prisoners. However, that evening, the Germans permitted all the prisoners to leave during an hour-long truce.

The American 83rd Infantry Division was responsible for the liberation of Saint Malo, including Fort National. The fort itself was liberated on 16 August, but not till after allied shellfire had damaged it. The fort was later restored in accordance with Vauban's original plans.

== Tourist information ==
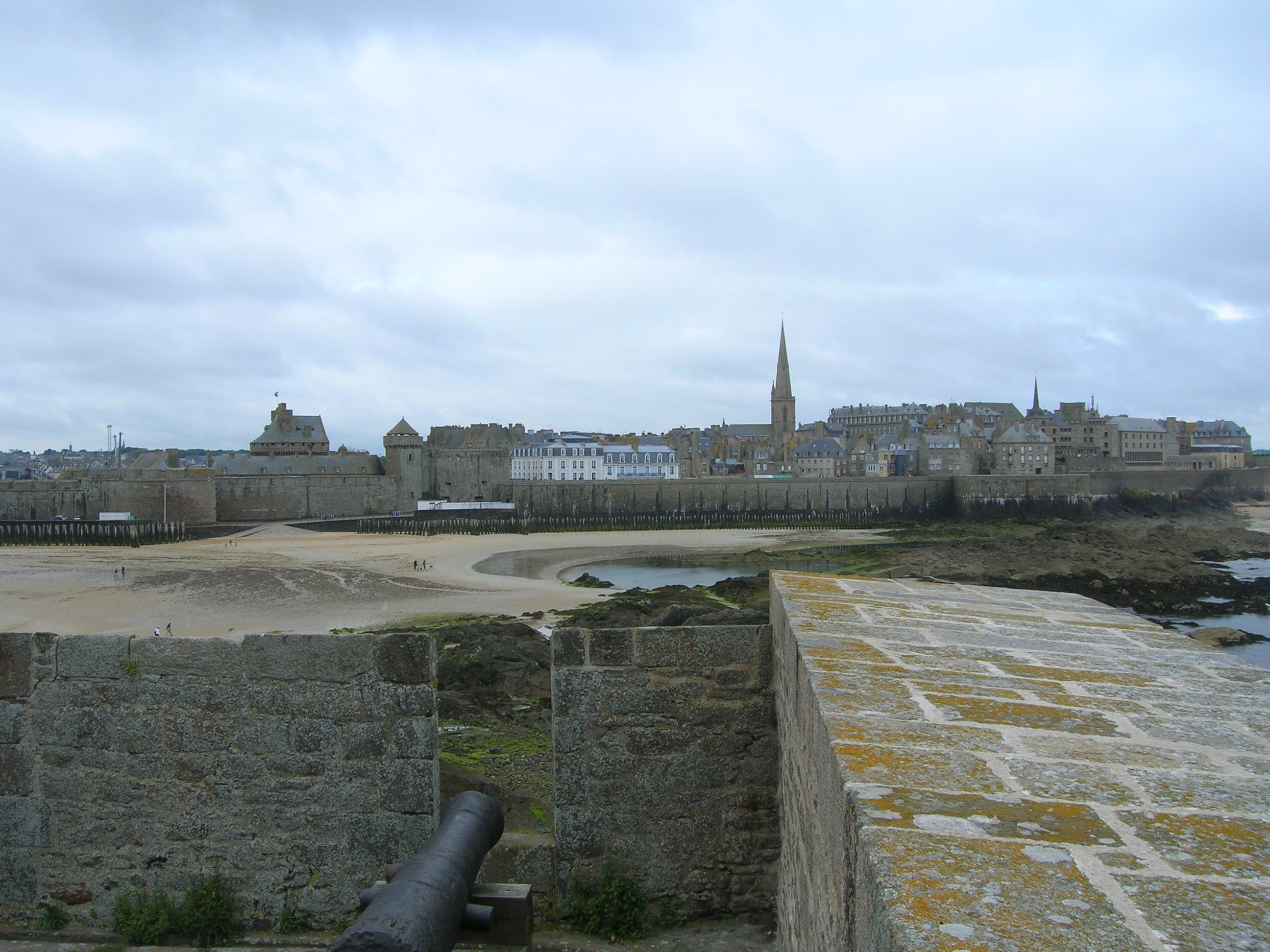
Saint-Malo, viewed from Fort National

One may visit the fort when the fort is flying the French flag. Access is only possible at low tide during the period from 1 June to 30 September and on certain other days. To see the daily opening times see the fort's website.

== Sources ==
- History of Fort National
