= Michel Dubocage =

French merchant and explorer

Michel Dubocage seigneur de Bléville
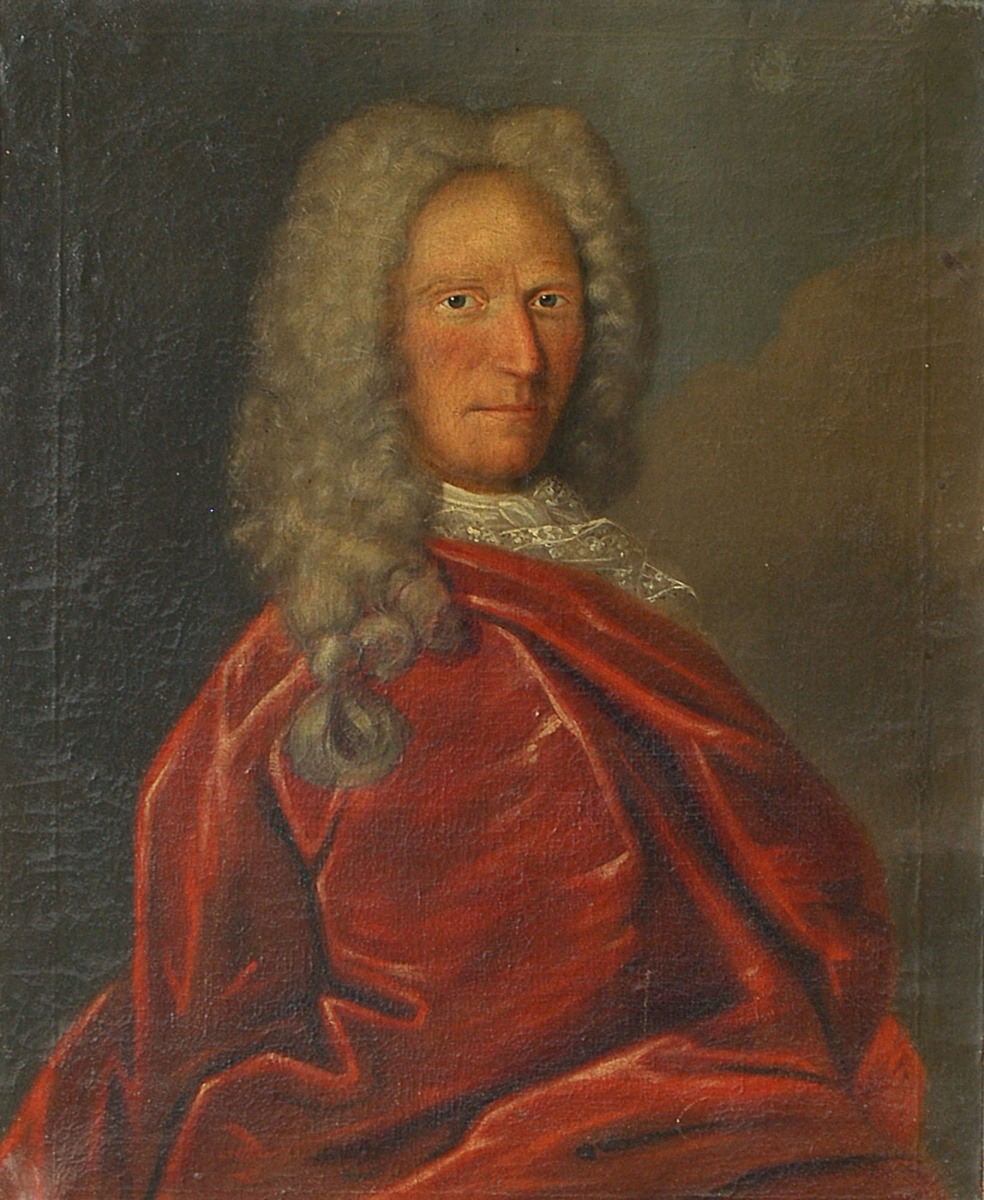
- Born: June 28, 1676; Le Havre, France
- Died: May 10, 1727 (aged 50); Le Havre, France
- Occupations: ship captain; merchant
- Known for: discovery of Clipperton Island
- Spouse: Marie-Jeanne Boissaye du Bocage (m. 1705)
- Military career
- Allegiance: Kingdom of France
- Branch: French Navy
- Service years: c. 1690–1704
- Conflicts: Nine Years' War
- Awards: sword of honour

Michel Joseph Dubocage, seigneur de Bléville, (Note: Some sources render his surname as du Bocage or Dubocage de Bléville.) (28 January 1676 – 10 May 1727) was a French corsair, explorer, and merchant credited with first charting Clipperton Island.

== Biography ==
Dubocage was born in the Notre-Dame quartier of Le Havre to ship captain Nicolas Dubocage and Marie Dufresnil. Dubocage went sea with Jean Bart's squadron during the Nine Years' War and he earned a commission as a frigate lieutenant on 1 January 1692, a few weeks before he turned 16, along with a sword of honour from Louis XIV. When he was 18, Dubocage captained Le Sauvage, a Dunkirk raider.

In 1703, he obtained command of the new, 30-gun light frigate Dauphine, which he used as a privateer. The ship was lost 11 December 1704 on the Banc de la Natière at the entrance to the port of Saint-Malo while bringing in an English prize, The Dragon, captured off Ushant, Brittany. Dubocage was cleared of fault in the wreck.

From 1707 to 1716, Dubocage captained in a nine-year commercial expedition around the Pacific Ocean aboard La Découverte. The four ships of the expedition left Le Havre for Brest on 6 September 1707, departing Brest on 23 March 1708. After a year-long delay at the Río de la Plata, La Découverte and La Princesse, captained by Martin de Chassiron, continued on their journey to the Pacific. In January 1710, the ships passed Cape Horn en route to Chile and Peru.

While sailing from Peru to Guam, Dubocage discovered Clipperton Island, naming it "Île de la Passion" as La Découverte reached it on Good Friday, 3 April 1711. La Princesse arrived the following day as Dubocage sailed around the island mapping it and assessing its possible value. From Guam, La Découverte sailed on to Amoy (now Xiamen, China) before sailing back to Peru via California. From there, they continued on, rounding Cape Horn and returning to Le Havre on 23 August 1716. In 1711, during his year in Amoy, Dubocage negotiated the first Franco–Chinese maritime commercial treaty. From this journey, La Découverte returned laden with 1.2 million livres (Note: 1.2 million livres in 1717 is equivalent to about €26.4 million in 2023. (Convertisseur de Monnaie d'Ancien Régime)) worth of gold, silver, and trade goods.

Having made his fortune, he returned to Le Havre and set up a trading house. He purchased a hôtel particulier in the Saint-François quarter (now the Musée Dubocage de Bléville museum) along with other lands around Le Havre, including acquiring the seigneurie of Bléville in 1717.

== Personal life ==
In 1705, he married Marie-Jeanne Boissaye du Bocage (1681–1728), daughter of the royal hydrographic engineer Georges Boissaye du Bocage, and they had one son, also named Michel Joseph (1707–1756), who served as an alderman in Le Havre. Dubocage died in 1727 and was buried in the parish church of Saint-Jean-Baptiste in Bléville.

== See also ==
Shipwrecks of Saint Malo
