= Shipwrecks of Saint Malo =

Two shipwrecks off Brittany, France

The two Shipwrecks of Saint Malo, the Aimable Grenot and the Dauphin, were found in 1995 on the Natière reef off the coast of Saint-Malo, dating to the first part of the 18th century. Their discovery and the later underwater excavation has given insight into 18th century marine lifestyles and shipbuilding.

== Saint Malo in the 18th century ==
In the 17th and 18th centuries the Port of Saint-Malo was very busy and heavily used, with over 3000 arrivals and departures and 100,000 tonnes of trade each year. However the harbour as it was bore the full brunt of strong currents, a large tidal range and reefs. Thus, the reefs and rocks have one of the world's largest underwater graveyards. The port trade led to local population growth and new buildings. The more easterly towns of Granville and Le Havre, some of which saw prior short stays at Saint-Malo for urgent resupply/repairs, were also key to transcontinental trade.

== The Dauphine ==
La Dauphine was built over the winter of 1702–03 and fitted out as a 300 tonne frigate, when she was sunk she was under the command of Captain Michel Dubocage. The excavations uncovered 31 metres of the starboard side from the aft to the gun deck. As a commercial raiding (privateer) vessel she had been given to private merchants by Louis XIV for "Commerce Raiding Against the State's Enemies". She was escorting a captured English ship, the Dragon, when she sank at the entrance to Saint-Malo on 11 December 1704. The ship appeared to have gone over the Atlantic or the Mediterranean, as ascertained by the presence of crockery, heavy ordinance and both pistols. Many finds were recovered including personal items of the crew.

Research has built up an image of Dubocage, from La Havre. He had been a frigate lieutenant since the age of 16 and captained his first vessel at the age of 18 in 1694. He appears to have been a party to commercial raids. After the sinking he was cleared of incompetence and went on to have a full naval career including expeditions to the Pacific; he died in 1727 as a wealthy benefactor to La Havre.

== The Aimable Grenot ==
L'Aimable Grenot was another privateer bound for Cádiz in Spain to ply Mediterranean trade at the time of its sinking. It was also preserved on its starboard side from the keel to the second deck, for a length of 36 metres. It was dated by dendrochronology to having been built around 1746/47 in Granville, weighing 400 tonnes. Along with personal items and artefacts related to the sailing of the ship such as rigging and tools, the ship also contained cast-iron ingots stamped with 1746 and 1747. These ingots were stamped with the marks POTUXENT and Stepn Onion, which refer to two Baltimore iron foundries which supplied ballast for English ships.

The ship came out of Granville which had its archives badly damaged during the Occupation of France making it harder to identify the ship's crew and voyages. However its captains have been identified as Pierre de la Houssaye who handed over to Joseph François Hugon, sieur du Prey in 1647. It appears that both had a daring reputation and the ship had become famous at the time of its sinking.

== Excavations ==
The ships were discovered in 1995 by Jean-Pierre Génar, a diver scouting around two "ship-traps", large rocks that nearly emerge at very low tides, at the north and south end of the Natière reef. It appears that the reef and surrounding sands had provided excellent protection for the wrecks, even though their remains were scattered over 1,000 square metres (1,200 sq yd). Ten excavations took place from 1999 to 2008, which confirmed the identifications. The ships were dated using dendrochronology.
