= Fort de la Conchée =

Coordinates: 48°41′01″N 2°02′39″W

Fort de la Conchée is a fortification on the rocky island of Quincé, four kilometers north-west of St Malo, France. Constructed by Sébastien Vauban the fort covers almost the entire island. The fortress consists of a service building built on high, thick granite masonry walls two stories high. An oval upper terrace with embrasures facing the open sea served as the fort's site for the fort's battery. Today, the fort is a nature reserve for seabirds.

== History ==
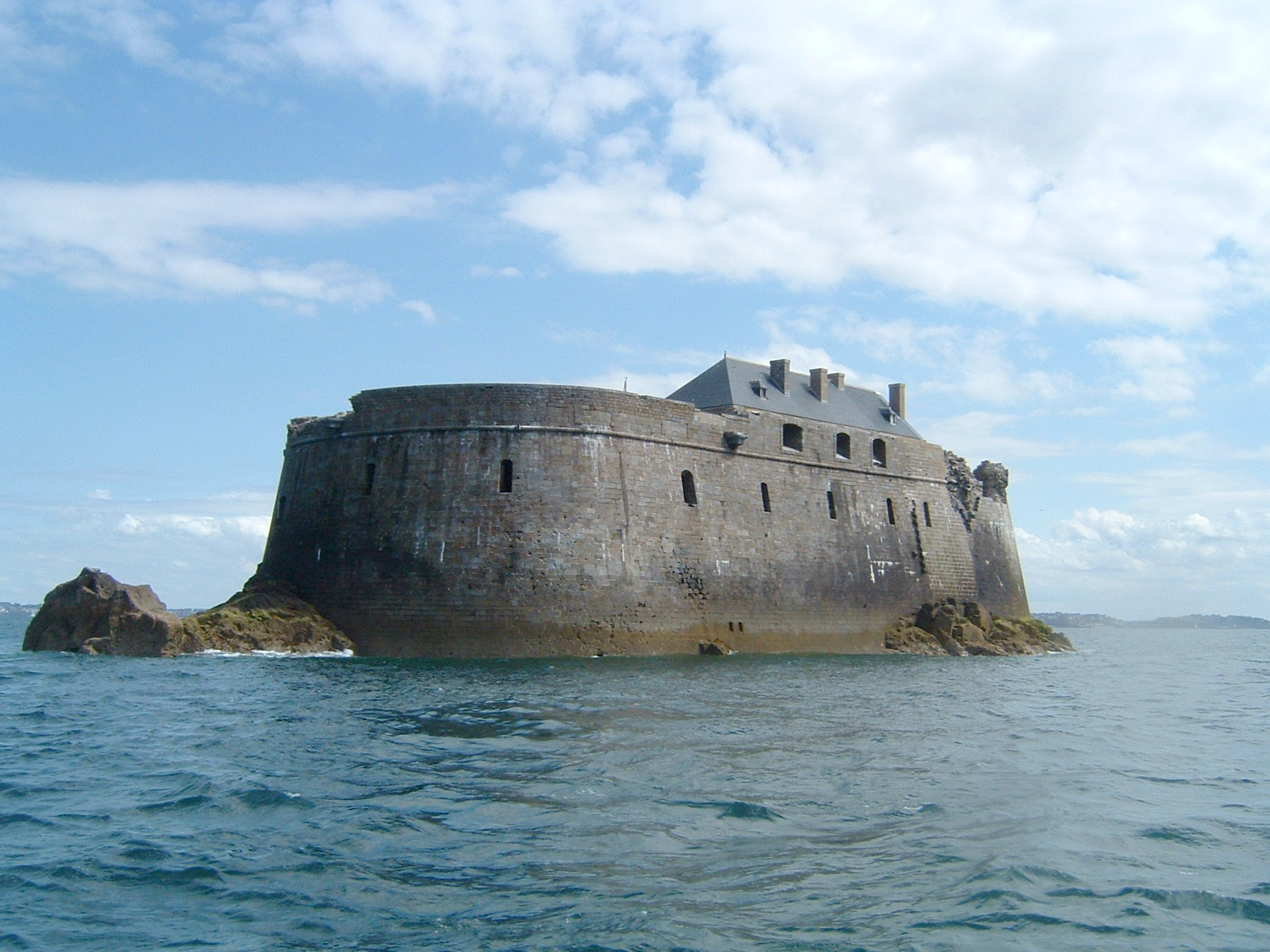
Fort de la Conchée

In 1689 Vauban conducted an inspections of French coastal fortifications for King Louis XIV, who wished to strengthen and improve the country's defences. In 1693, whilst the fort was being constructed, the English raided the town. They landed on Conchée, where they slighted the works and captured those working on the fort.

The English, with their Dutch allies, attacked the fortress again in 1695. Though the fort was unfinished, ten guns had been installed, which permitted the French to repulse the attack. The battery then turned its guns on the main attacking fleet, causing much damage to it. The fort was finally finished in 1705.

The fortress was declared obsolete in 1889 and demilitarised in 1901.

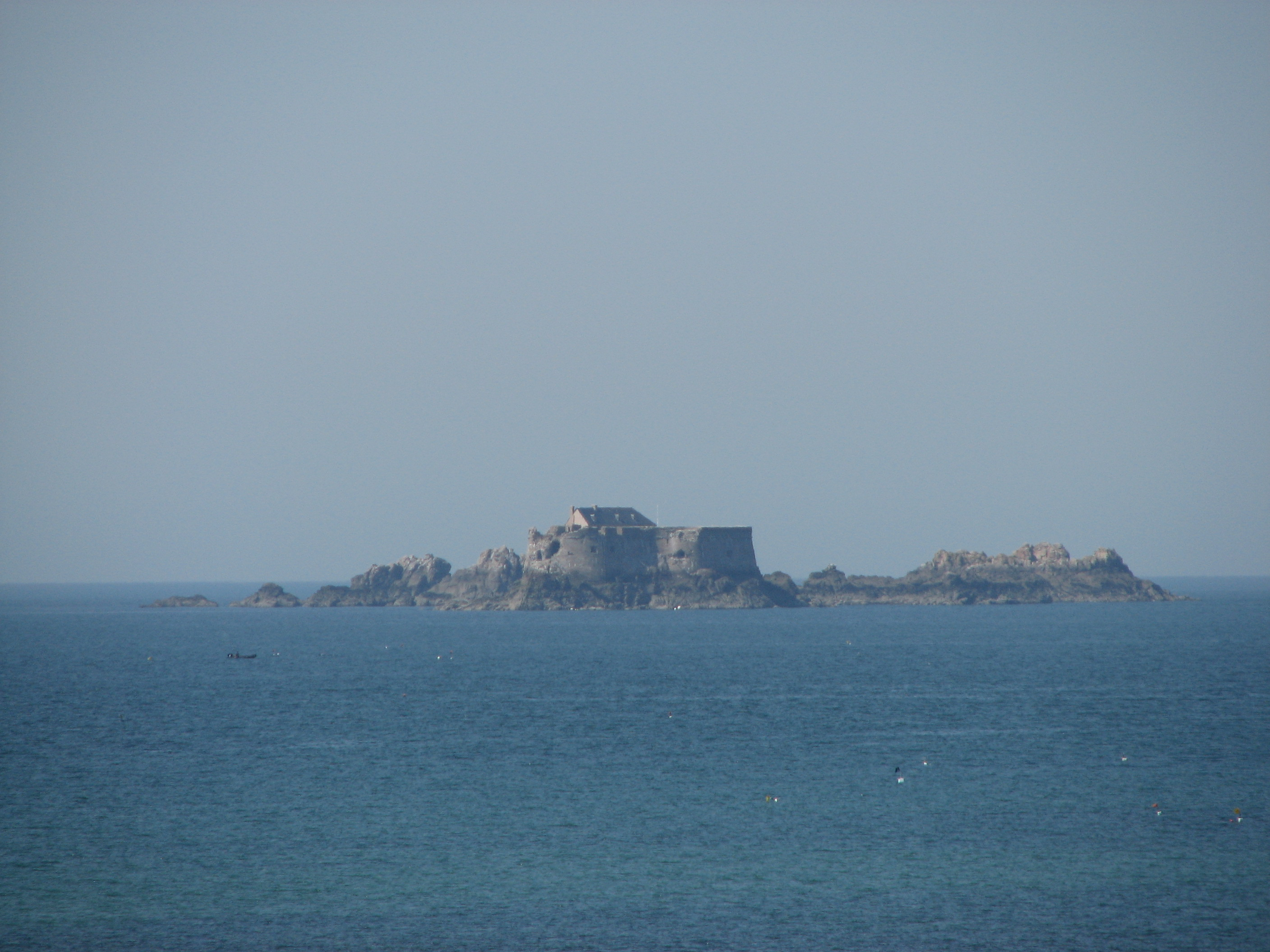
Conchée at low tide

During the Second World War the Germans used the abandoned fort for target practice. The Allies then attacked the fort during St Malo's liberation.
