= Luna Wedler =

Swiss actress (born 1999)

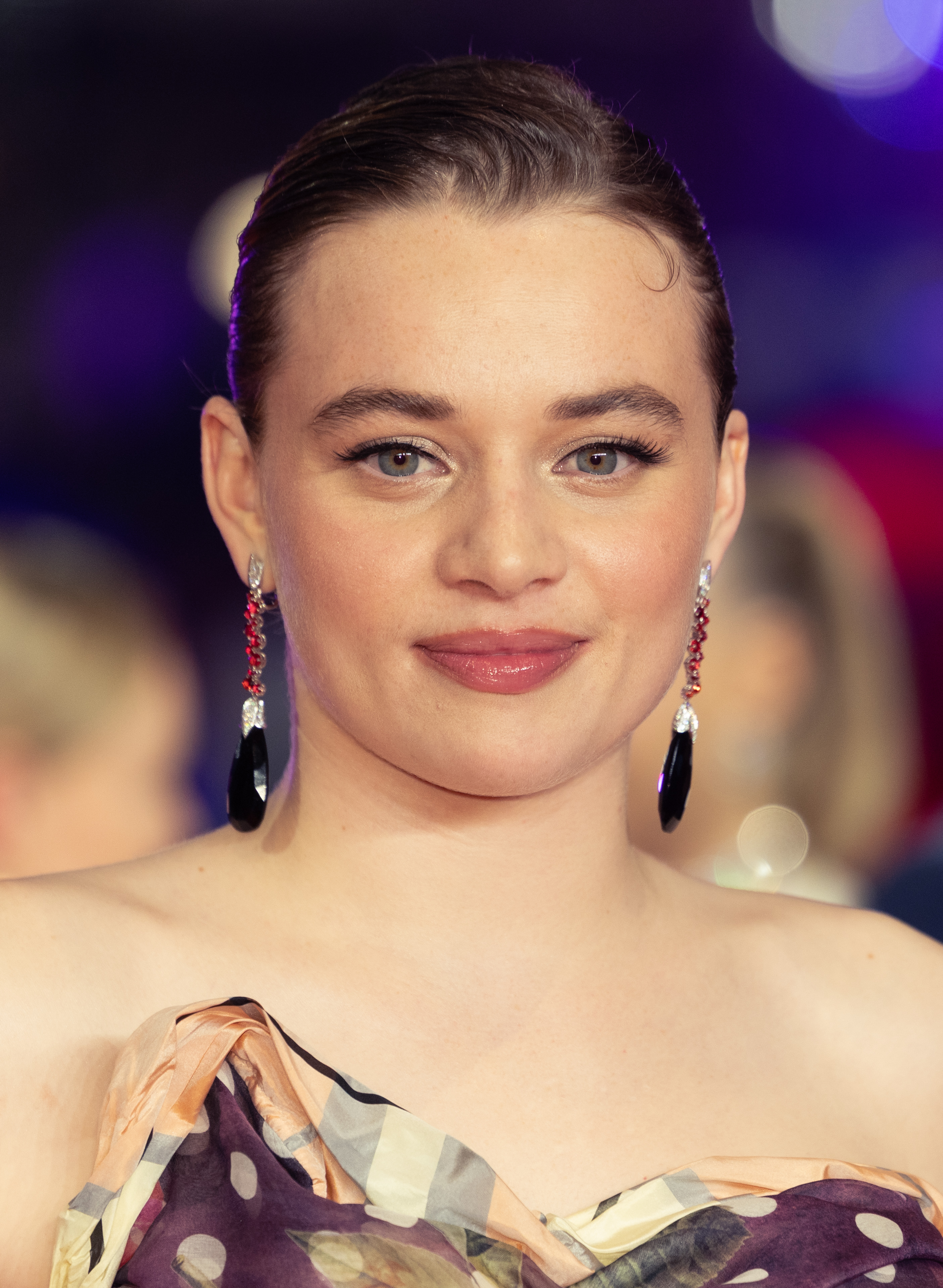
- Wedler in 2026
- Born: 26 October 1999 (age 26); Zürich, Switzerland
- Education: European Film Actor School
- Occupation: Actress
- Years active: 2015–present
- Known for: Biohackers

Luna Wedler (born 26 October 1999) is a Swiss actress. She gained popularity by starring in the 2020 Netflix series Biohackers. For her performance in Silent Friend (2025), she won the Marcello Mastroianni Award at the 82nd Venice International Film Festival.

== Early life ==
Wedler grew up alongside two siblings in Zürich's District 6.

She studied contemporary dance between 2016 and 2018 at the European Film Actor School in Zürich.

== Career ==
Wedler had her debut in 2015, starring in Niklaus Hilbers' film Amateur Teens. In an interview, she said she applied for her first movie role at 14 years of age "just like that". Since then, acting has fascinated her, especially embodying characters with dark sides. At the age of 17, she starred in Blue My Mind, in which her character moves to a new school and indulges in a lifestyle of excess involving wild parties, drugs, and sex. She tells in retrospect: "This role affected me psychologically and demanded everything from me".

She went on to appear in a number of films, including The Most Beautiful Girl in the World (2018), as well as television series such as The Team.

In August 2020, Netflix released the techno-thriller series Biohackers. Wedler holds the lead role on the show, in which she seeks revenge for the death of her twin brother. A second season was released in July 2021.

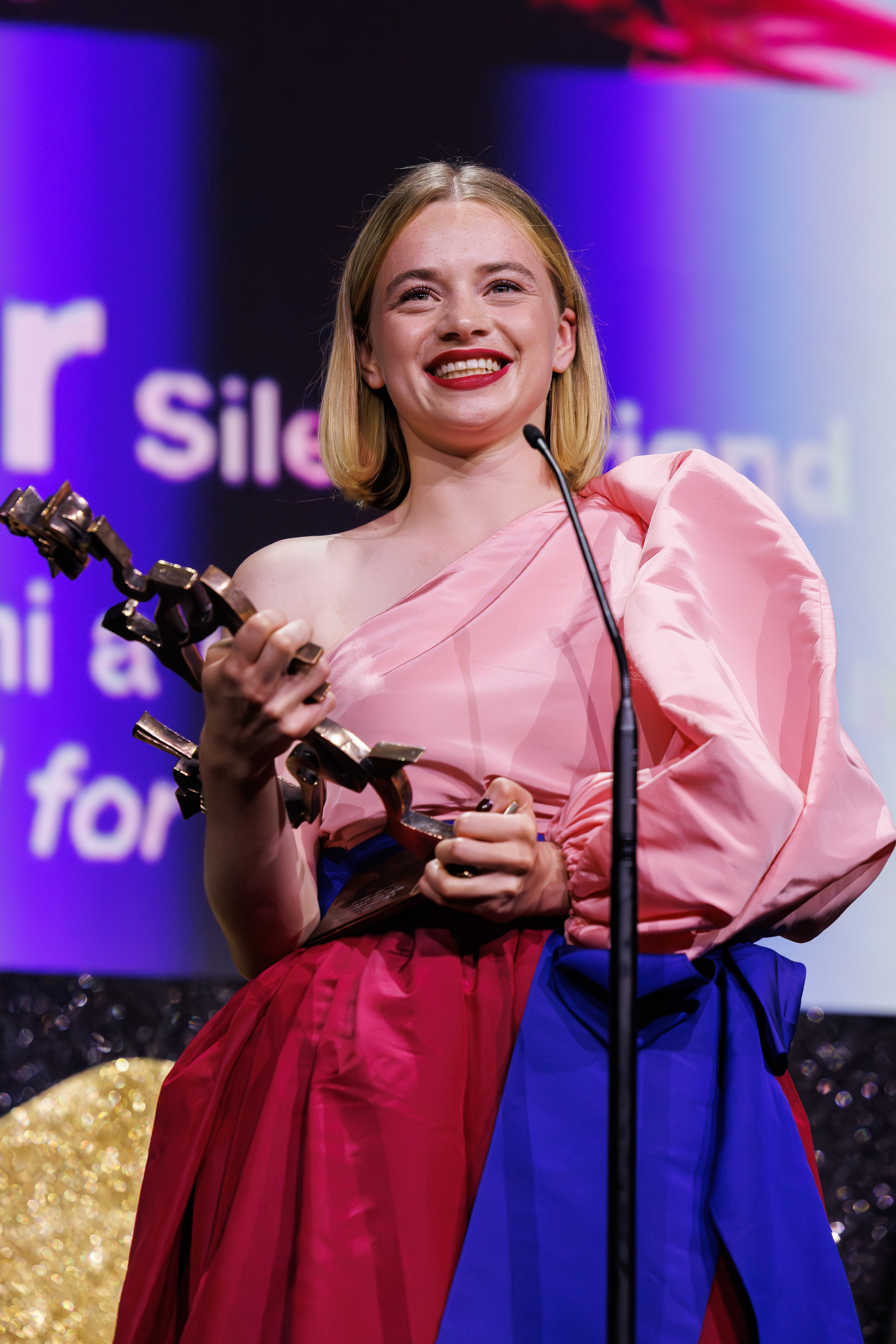
Wedler at the 82nd Venice International Film Festival, 2025

Beginning in May 2021 and ending in the spring of 2022, Wedler played Sophie Scholl in an Instagram project that portrayed the White Rose activist's final year of life. In 2023, she starred in Netflix's adaptation of Anthony Doerr's 2014 war novel, All the Light We Cannot See. In 2025, she won the Marcello Mastroianni Award for Best New Young Actor or Actress at the 82nd Venice International Film Festival for her performance in the film Silent Friend.

== Filmography ==
=== Film ===
Year	Title	Role
2015	Amateur Teens	Milena
2018	Blue My Mind	Mia
2018	The Most Beautiful Girl in the World	Roxy
2019	Close to the Horizon	Jessica Koch
2021	Je suis Karl	Maxi
2021	The Story of My Wife	Grete
2022	What You Can See from Here	Luise
2023	Ingeborg Bachmann – Journey into the Desert	Marianne Oellers
2024	Marianengraben	Paula
2025	Silent Friend	Grete
2026	Allegro Pastell	Sarah Arnheim
2026	The Girl with the Leica	Ruth Cerf
2026	Eurotrash	

=== Television ===
Year	Title	Role	Notes
2015	The Team	Claudia Weiss	8 episodes
2020–2021	Biohackers	Emma "Mia Akerlund" Engels	12 episodes
2023	All the Light We Cannot See	Jutta Pfennig	2 episodes

== Awards and recognition ==
- 2018: Shooting Stars Award
- 2018: Swiss Film Award – Best Actress for Blue My Mind
- 2018: Günter-Rohrbach-Filmpreis for The Most Beautiful Girl in the World, together with Aaron Hilmer
- 2019: New Faces Award – Best Young Actress for The Most Beautiful Girl in the World
- 2020: Bavarian Film Awards – Best Young Actress
- 2021: German Film Award – nominated for Best Actress, Je suis Karl
- 2025: Marcello Mastroianni Award – Best New Young Actor or Actress for Silent Friend
