= All the Light We Cannot See (soundtrack) =

All the Light We Cannot See (Soundtrack from the Netflix Series)

Soundtrack album by James Newton Howard
- Released: November 2, 2023
- Recorded: 2022–2023
- Genre: Soundtrack
- Length: 107:43
- Label: Sony Classical
- Producer: James Newton Howard

James Newton Howard chronology
Pain Hustlers (2023)	All the Light We Cannot See (2023)	The Hunger Games: The Ballad of Songbirds & Snakes (2023)

All the Light We Cannot See (Soundtrack from the Netflix Series) is the score album to the 2023 streaming television miniseries created and written by Steven Knight and directed by Shawn Levy, based on Anthony Doerr's Pulitzer Prize winning novel of the same name. The original score is written and composed by James Newton Howard and the 52-track album released in conjunction with the series premiere on November 2, 2023 through Sony Classical Records.

== Development ==
James Newton Howard confirmed to compose the miniseries by March 2022. In an interview to The Hollywood Reporter, Knight said that the score has been "both powerful and emotional" after he visited the Abbey Road Studios in London, where the series' score had been recorded and said that "the scene is put up on the screen, the orchestra is all there, and the conductor is conducting so that the music is following the scene. And just to see the two things together in that studio environment breaks your heart, so that when you're in the darkened room and you're looking at it on the screen it's even more so." Shawn Levy also went to London to listen the recording of the score during December 2022.

== Track listing ==
No.	Title	Artist(s)	Length
1.	"Main Title"		1:23
2.	"August 1944"		1:16
3.	"Falling Leaflets"		0:57
4.	"Werner Listens"		1:22
5.	"Secrets"		2:19
6.	"Depart Immediately"		1:22
7.	"Model City"		3:23
8.	"To the Museum"		0:52
9.	"A Day at the Museum"		3:29
10.	"Wire"		1:36
11.	"Messages in Code"		1:53
12.	"A Small Miracle"		0:53
13.	"A Great Professor"		1:04
14.	"Top of My Class"		1:09
15.	"Reason to Hope"		0:51
16.	"Spilled Milk"		4:49
17.	"Ten Seconds"		1:57
18.	"Retrieving the Jewels"		3:06
19.	"Father's Fault"		1:01
20.	"Burning Carousel"		0:30
21.	"Illegal Broadcast"		3:31
22.	"Broken Radio"		2:58
23.	"Fix It or Die"		2:22
24.	"No Trains Left"		1:42
25.	"Burden"		1:26
26.	"A Promise"		2:46
27.	"Traditional Welcome"		2:49
28.	"Finding 1310"		1:52
29.	"Time to Meet"		1:17
30.	"Take the Weapon"		2:00
31.	"Thought Destroys Action"		2:28
32.	"Genius Is a Gift"		1:45
33.	"You Are the Professor"		2:13
34.	"Catching Breath"		1:13
35.	"Model Building"		2:24
36.	"The Committee"		2:17
37.	"Speak to Me"		2:25
38.	"Fearless"		2:45
39.	"No Escape"		1:28
40.	"No Time for Games"		2:27
41.	"Ask Me Again"		2:43
42.	"I Need Your Strength"		2:18
43.	"I Am Not Alone"		1:18
44.	"Not Today"		1:39
45.	"Uncle Etienne Sent Me"		1:18
46.	"Sound Warnings"		1:05
47.	"The Most Important Light"		2:19
48.	"Liberation"		4:03
49.	"Sea of Flames"		2:16
50.	"Saint-Malo"		2:31
51.	"Model City Duet"	James Newton Howard; James Ehnes	2:13
52.	"Clair de Lune"	Alison Procter	4:40
Total length:			107:43

== Reception ==
Belen Edwards of Mashable wrote "James Newton Howard's soaring score contrasts with the whistles and explosions of bombs and artillery." Carla Meyer of TheWrap and Alan Sepinwall of Rolling Stone called the score "overwrought" and "soaring". Daniel Fienberg of The Hollywood Reporter wrote "James Newton Howard's swelling score offers no doubt on when you're supposed to feel things." Gregory Wakeman of The National wrote "James Newton Howard's music repeatedly elevates the trite material".
