= Roxane Duran =

French-Austrian actress (born 1993)

- Born: 27 January 1993 (age 33); Paris, France
- Occupation: Actress
- Years active: 2009–present

Roxane Duran (born 27 January 1993) is a French-Austrian actress. She made her debut in the Palme d'Or-winning 2009 film The White Ribbon and has since appeared in movies, series and on stage, acting in English, French and German. In 2024 she starred in the AMC series Interview with the Vampire from showrunner Rolin B. Jones and appeared in Gianluca Jodice's movie The Flood.

== Early life and career ==
Duran was born and grew up in Paris, where she went to the international school Ecole Bilingue Manuel.

After her debut in the Palme d'Or winning movie The White Ribbon by Michael Haneke, Duran appeared in movies encompassing a variety of genres. These included the medieval drama Michael Kohlhaas with Mads Mikkelsen, the comedy La famille Bélier (original idea for the Oscar-nominated movie CODA), and Mrs Harris Goes to Paris with Isabelle Huppert and Leslie Manville. Duran also acted in the horror movie Eight For Silver by Sean Ellis.

Duran starred in Riviera, a Sky Atlantic series created by Neil Jordan, where she played Adriana Clios for two seasons. She is also seen in the second season of Interview with the Vampire, the Gothic horror series created by Rolin Jones for AMC.

She performed on stage for the first time in 2012 as the lead in the play Le journal d'Anne Frank by Eric Emmanuel Schmitt. She returned to theater with the French adaptation of Beau Willimon's Farragut North in 2014, and in a play by Pierre de Marivaux in 2019 with French actors Sylvie Testud and Éric Elmosnino.

== Filmography ==
=== Film ===
| Year | Title | Role | Director | Notes | Ref(s) |
|---|---|---|---|---|---|
| 2009 | The White Ribbon | Anna | Michael Haneke | In Competition – 2009 Cannes Film Festival | |
| 2011 | The Monk | Agnès | Dominik Moll | | |
| 2011 | 17 Girls | Florence | Delphine Coulin et Muriel Coulin | | |
| 2012 | Augustine | Rosalie | Alice Winocour | | |
| 2013 | Age of Uprising: The Legend of Michael Kohlhaas | Princess Marguerite de Navarre | Arnaud des Pallières | In Competition – 2013 Cannes Film Festival | |
| 2013 | Mary Queen of Scots | Mary Seton | Thomas Imbach | | |
| 2013 | Midsummer | Anja | Bernhard Landen et Judith Angerbauer | | |
| 2014 | Respire | Victoire | Mélanie Laurent | | |
| 2014 | La Famille Bélier (English: The Bélier Family) | Mathilde | Eric Lartigau | | |
| 2015 | Evolution | Stella | Lucile Hadzihalilovic | 2015 Official Selection at San Sebastian Film Festival | |
| 2015 | Paula | Clara Westhoff | Christian Schwochow | | |
| 2020 | Lovers | Nathalie | Nicole Garcia | | |
| 2021 | Eight for Silver | Anais | Sean Ellis | | |
| 2022 | The Ways to Happiness | Rachel | Nicolas Steil | | |
| 2022 | Mrs. Harris Goes to Paris | Marguerite | Anthony Fabian | | |
| 2024 | The Flood | Princesse de Lamballe | Gianluca Jodice | Opening of Locarno Film Festival 2024 | |
| TBA | The Bitter End † | | Mike Newell | Filming | |

Key
| † | Denotes films that have not yet been released |

=== Television ===
| Year | Title | Role | Notes |
|---|---|---|---|
| 2014 | Witnesses | Laura | 6 episodes |
| 2017–2020 | Riviera | Adriana Clios | 21 episodes |
| 2018 | Germanized | Chloé | 10 episodes |
| 2019 | Clash of Futures; Krieg der Träume 1918-1938 | Edith Wellspacher | 3 episodes |
| 2022–2025 | Marie Antoinette | Joséphine | Season 1, 6 episodes |
| 2023 | Der Schatten | Emma | 4 episodes |
| 2024 | Cristobal Balenciaga | Cécile | Season 1, episode 2 |
| 2024 | Interview with the Vampire | Madeleine Éparvier | Season 2, 5 episodes |
| 2025 | Vienna Game | Marie Louise | 4 episodes |

=== Plays ===
| Year | Title | Role | Notes |
|---|---|---|---|
| 2012–2013 | The Diary of Anne Frank | Anne Frank | adaptation of Éric-Emmanuel Schmitt |
| 2014 | Les Cartes du Pouvoir, the retitled French stage adaptation of the play Farragut North | Molly | written by Beau Willimon |
| 2019 | L'Heureux Stratagème | Lisette | written by Marivaux |
