= Vienna Game (TV series) =

Austrian television series

- Genre: Historical satire
- Screenplay by: Stefan Brunner
- Directed by: Hannu Salonen
- Starring: Marlene Tanczik; Daniel Donskoy; Alexander Scheer; Vladimir Burlakov; Emma Nova; Trystan Pütter; Martin Greis-Rosenthal; Axel Milberg; Ben Miles; Louis-Do de Lencquesaing; Julia Anna Grob; Roxane Duran; Erwin Steinhauer; Fritz Karl; Serge Falck; Heikko Deutschmann; Corinna Pumm; Valentin Postlmayr; Stefan Gorski; Heike Makatsch; Annika Wonner
- Country of origin: Austria
- Original language: German
- No. of episodes: 6

Production
- Producer: Bettina Kuhn
- Cinematography: Felix Cramer
- Production company: Satel Film

Original release
- Network: Disney+
- Release: 18 November 2026

Vienna Game is a six-part Austrian historical satire miniseries for Disney+. All six episodes premiered on 18 November 2026.

== Premise ==
The series takes an irreverent view of a European diplomacy during the Congress of Vienna in 1814 depicting a party-like atmosphere following the downfall of Napoleon Bonaparte.

== Cast ==
- Marlene Tanczik as Princess Wilhelmine, Duchess of Sagan
- Daniel Donskoy as Amor Laski
- Alexander Scheer as Klemens von Metternich
- Vladimir Burlakov as Emperor Alexander I of Russia
- Marcell Krenacs
- Martin Greis-Rosenthal
- Joel Cederberg
- Trystan Pütter as Frederick William III
- Emma Nova
- Stefan Gorski
- Fritz Karl
- Erwin Steinhauer
- Roxane Duran
- Louis-Do de Lencquesaing
- Ben Miles as Robert Stewart, Viscount Castlereagh
- Axel Milberg
- Heike Makatsch
- Heikko Deutschmann as Franz I of Austria
- Corinna Pumm
- Valentin Postlmayr
- Lukas Walcher
- Serge Falck
- Jakob Diehl
- Catrin Striebeck
- Rufus Beck
- Annika Wonner
- Michou Friesz

== Production ==
The series was in development at Satel Film under the working title 1814 - Vienna Game in June 2021. Creator and script writer of the series is Stefan Brunner, Bettina Kuhn of Satel Film is co-creator and producer. Hannu Salonen directs ahead of a planned 2025 broadcast on Disney+. Couture design on the series is by fashion designer Susanne Bisovsky.

Filming got underway in Austria and Hungary on 20 February 2024. The lead cast are Axel Milberg, Marlene Tanczik, Daniel Donskoy, Alexander Scheer, Fritz Karl, Erwin Steinhauer, Vladimir Burlakov, Trystan Pütter, Emma Nova, Roxane Duran, Ben Miles, Louis-Do de Lencquesaing, Martin Greis-Rosenthal, Julia Anna Grob, Axel Milberg, Corinna Pumm, Valentin Postlmayr and Stefan Gorski. The cast also includes Rufus Beck, Jakob Diehl, Catrin Striebeck and Heike Makatsch.

== Release ==
The series premiered on Disney+ on 18 November 2026.
