= Aziz Dyab =

Syrian actor

- Born: Abdulaziz Dyab; 1995; Idlib, Syria
- Years active: 2018–present

Abdulaziz Dyab (born 1995) is a Syrian-German actor. His films include Je suis Karl (2021). On television, he is known for his roles in the Netflix series Unorthodox (2020) and the Apple TV+ series Liaison (2023).

== Early life ==
Dyab was born in Idlib, northwestern Syria. His home was often in the firing line of the Syrian civil war. Dyab moved to Aleppo to study, but the war escalated and conditions worsened. In September 2015 at the age of 20, he fled to Germany, where he was granted asylum and eventually settled in Frankfurt an der Oder. He joined a local community theatre group to improve his German-language skills. In 2016, he intended to study mechatronics at Karlsruhe University. Dyab appeared in a 2017 documentary titled I'm Here Now Somehow directed by David Regos.

== Career ==
Dyab made his television debut playing Salim in the 2020 critically acclaimed multilingual Netflix miniseries Unorthodox. This was followed in 2021 by his feature film debut in Christian Schwochow's Je suis Karl as Libyan migrant Yusuf and Anne Zohra Berrached's Copilot as Karim. He also made guest appearances in the ZDF crime dramas SOKO Leipzig and SOKO Potsdam, and the Das Erste anthology series Baltic Crimes, and appeared in the television films Der Beschützer and Bring mich nach Hause.

In 2023, Dyab played Samir Hamza, a hacker, in the British-French thriller series Liaison on Apple TV+. In a 2023 interview with The Upcoming, Dyab stated he was writing a film based on his childhood memories.

== Filmography ==
=== Film ===
Year	Title	Role	Notes
2017	I'm Here Now Somehow	Himself	Short documentary
2018	Look Baba I'm Happy	Gulzar	Short film
2021	Je suis Karl	Yusuf	
2021	Copilot (German: Die Frau des Piloten)	Karim	

=== Television ===
Year	Title	Role	Notes
2020	Unorthodox	Salim	Miniseries, 4 episodes
2020, 2022	SOKO Leipzig	Mehdi Zakani / Mio Baumgert	2 episodes
2021	Der Beschützer	Hamsa	Television film
2021	Bring mich nach Hause	Mirchard	Television film
2021	Baltic Crimes (German: Der Usedom-Krimi)	Sanitäter	Episode: "Entführt"
2022	SOKO Potsdam	Rosti	Episode: "Tatütata"
2023	Liaison	Samir Hamza	6 episodes
2023	Tatort	Fawad Saad	Episode: "Nichts als die Wahrheit"
2025	House of David	Nethaneel	Recurring role
