= Cloud Cuckoo Land (novel) =

2021 novel by Anthony Doerr

- First edition cover
- Author: Anthony Doerr
- Language: English
- Genres: Historical fiction, science fiction, fantasy
- Published: September 28, 2021
- Publisher: Scribner
- Publication place: United States
- Pages: 640
- ISBN: 978-1-982168-43-8
- OCLC: 1233266494
- Dewey Decimal: 813/.6
- LC Class: PS3604.O34 C56 2021

Cloud Cuckoo Land is a 2021 historical and speculative fiction novel by American author Anthony Doerr. It was first published on September 28, 2021, in the United States by Charles Scribner's Sons and the United Kingdom by Fourth Estate. The novel centers on an Ancient Greek codex that links characters from fifteenth-century Constantinople, present-day Idaho, and a twenty-second-century starship.

== Synopsis ==
Cloud Cuckoo Land is the story of five characters spanning eight centuries, told in anachronic order. Their stories are bound by an Ancient Greek codex entitled Cloud Cuckoo Land that each of the five characters discover and find solace in. It is a fictional book written by real Greek novelist Antonius Diogenes in the second century, and tells the story of Aethon, a shepherd on a quest to find the fabled paradise in the sky. In his travels, he is transformed into a donkey, a sea bass, and finally a crow, which allows him to fly to the gates of the city in the clouds.

=== Anna and Omeir ===
In the fifteenth-century Byzantine Empire, Anna is an orphaned young girl living with her older sister Maria in Constantinople, where they work for a group of church seamstresses. Anna secretly learns to read Greek and, with the help of a local boy, takes out old books from a tower to sell to Italian collectors. Anna observes people fleeing as the city's defeat by the amassing Ottoman army becomes more likely. She discovers a copy of Cloud Cuckoo Land and keeps it with her.

Meanwhile, Omeir is a boy born with a cleft lip. He grows up in a remote cottage, where his grandfather teaches him how to live off the land. The family's cow births two strong twin oxen named Moonlight and Tree, and Omeir becomes skilled at handling them. Omeir is conscripted into the army, but the oxen die while helping build cannons.

Constantinople falls, and Anna flees with the codex. She comes across Omeir, now a deserter. The two return to Omeir's family's home and Anna eventually acclimates. In the next decades, Anna teaches him and their sons Aethon's story. After Anna's death, Omeir takes the codex to Urbino in hopes of preserving it.

=== Zeno ===
Zeno Ninis lives in midcentury Lakeport, Idaho with his stepmother and finds solace in the library. He volunteers for the Korean War but is taken as a prisoner of war. In the camp, he befriends and falls in love with Rex, an English classicist and fellow POW. Rex introduces Zeno to the Greek language; the two are separated after Zeno does not join Rex in an escape attempt.

After the war, Zeno begins working for the Lakeport library. He reconnects with Rex, who reignites a love of translation in Zeno. After Rex's death, the Cloud Cuckoo Land codex is rediscovered and Zeno attempts to translate the surviving fragments. In 2020, he befriends a group of fifth-graders who decide to put on the story as a play.

=== Seymour ===
Throughout the early 21st century, Seymour, a disturbed autistic youngster raised by a single mother, is attached to a wild owl that lives nearby and is increasingly dismayed by deforestation in Lakeport. Seymour learns about climate change and becomes caught up with a group of ecoterrorists. They convince him that he must blow up a business next door to the library to prove himself.

Seymour brings bombs to the library on the night Zeno and the children are putting on a dress rehearsal. Zeno manages to take the bomb away and dies when it explodes. Seymour is arrested and spends the following decades performing prison labor for the Ilium Corporation, which is developing the Atlas, a virtual map of Earth. Seymour is tasked with removing unsavory images from the Atlas, but eventually subverts this directive by hiding the true photographs of Earth's climate changed-induced decline under owl-themed items.

Decades later, Seymour gets back in touch with the now-grown children and gifts them copies of Zeno's translation of Cloud Cuckoo Land.

=== Konstance ===
In the twenty-second century, Konstance is a young girl aboard the Argos, a generation starship heading for a planet called Beta Oph2. Konstance's father frequently read Cloud Cuckoo Land to her. After a plague strikes the ship, Konstance's father traps her in a vault with only the ship's artificial intelligence, Sibyl, for company.

Konstance spends her days exploring the Atlas in the ship's virtual library, eventually finding the Lakeport library. She decides to physically transcribe Cloud Cuckoo Land. Eventually, Konstance discovers the real images of Earth's decay that were disguised by Seymour. She learns that her great-grandmother was Rachel, one of the children saved by Zeno in the library, who had received a copy of the translation and passed Aethon's story on to Konstance's father.

Konstance investigates the Argos' origins and learns that it is not a starship, but an advanced bunker in Greenland. She sets a fire to convince Sibyl to let her out and finds the rest of the Argos abandoned. Years later, Konstance lives with a pre-industrial community in Greenland and tells Aethon's story to her son.

== Background ==
Doerr stated in Cloud Cuckoo Land's "Author's Note" that his novel draws on several other books, most notably Antonius Diogenes's now-lost "globetrotting tale", Wonders Beyond Thule. The Cloud Cuckoo Land codex is a fictional book-within-a-book that Doerr wrote, but credited to Diogenes. Ideas for the fable come from The Golden Ass by Apuleius, which Doerr says tells the story of a man turning into a donkey "with far more zest and skill than I do". Many of Zeno's experiences as a prisoner of war in Korea appear in Remembered Prisoners of a Forgotten War (2002) by Lewis H. Carlson.

While researching defensive walls for his previous novel All the Light We Cannot See (2014), which centers on the walled city of Saint-Malo, Doerr kept finding references to Constantinople. He said in an interview with Entertainment Weekly that its walls had withstood many sieges, and that it was only when gunpowder appeared in Europe that the Ottomans were able to breach its defenses with cannons in 1453. His fascination with the city's story made him realize that he had to write about it. Doerr said he set part of Cloud Cuckoo Land in the future to show how long ancient texts could survive. He noted that those sections are "not quite science fiction", but added that they were the result of extensive research into what life could be like then. Doerr added that Bill McKibben's book Falter: Has the Human Game Begun to Play Itself Out? (2019) helped him picture what Earth may look like in the twenty-second century.

== Reception ==
Publishers Weekly, in its starred review, wrote, "Doerr seamlessly shuffles each of these narratives in vignettes that keep the action in full flow and the reader turning the pages. The descriptions of Constantinople, Idaho, and the Argos are each distinct and fully realized, and the protagonists of each are united by a determination to survive and a hunger for stories." Kirkus Reviews agreed, also in a starred review, praising Doerr's many "narrative miracles" for uniting the novel's storylines.

In a review in The Guardian, Elizabeth Knox called Cloud Cuckoo Land "a gift of a novel", that is "large-hearted ... joyous [and] a deep lungful of fresh air". She complimented the skill with which Doerr weaves each of his character's narratives into Diogenes’ fable. Knox stated that Doerr's novel shows "how things survive by chance, and through love" and that love is needed "to save what we still have on Earth". In another review in The Guardian, Hephzibah Anderson wrote that Cloud Cuckoo Land is full of "[w]onderment and despair, love and destruction and hope". With its "lyrical" text and classical philosophy intermingling with the climate crisis, Anderson described the book as "a tribute to the magic of reading".

Marcel Theroux wrote in a review in The New York Times that Cloud Cuckoo Land is "a wildly inventive novel that teems with life, straddles an enormous range of experience and learning, and embodies the storytelling gifts that it celebrates." He said that its characters are "engaging" and the storytelling is "bracing and energetic". He found it "an amazing feat" that Doerr is able to hold together the different narratives, spanning eight centuries, and still produce a "compelling, coherent and moving" book. Theroux concluded that it is "a humane and uplifting book for adults that’s infused with the magic of childhood reading experiences."

In a largely negative review in The Irish Times, Barry Pierce called Doerr's "multi-genre epic" "a convoluted work". He said that while the sections in the present have some of the novel's "strongest plotting and best writing", the Constantinople pieces tend to stagnate, and the time spent aboard the Argos "reads like a literary fiction author attempting to do sci-fi". He also found the short chapters that hop between characters and genres "exhausting" and "the literary equivalent of late-night channel hopping". Pierce concluded that overall, the novel's plot is "technically, masterfully done", and notwithstanding the weaker sections, it keeps moving at a brisk pace, but added that "there may actually be some truth behind the concept of something being too big to fail." Writing in The Washington Post, Ron Charles also called Cloud Cuckoo Land "convoluted". He wrote that while each character's tales could have been a captivating novel (barring the science-fiction story, which he said "has a moldy Twilight Zone funk"), Doerr slices the plots up and scrambles them, creating "a textual puzzle as complicated as the ancient Diogenes codex."

Cloud Cuckoo Land won the 2022 Grand Prix de Littérature Américaine. It was a finalist for the 2021 National Book Award for Fiction. It was longlisted for the 2021 Andrew Carnegie Medal for Excellence in Fiction.

== Works cited ==
- Doerr, Anthony (2021). Cloud Cuckoo Land. Charles Scribner's Sons. ISBN 978-1-982168-43-8.
