= Yuja Wang discography =

Yuja Wang (born February 10, 1987) is a Chinese classical pianist who records on the Deutsche Grammophon label. She has released six CDs on with Deutsche Grammophon: Sonatas & Etudes in 2009; Transformation in 2010; Rachmaninov in 2011; and Fantasia, in March 2012. She has also performed on the soundtrack to the film Summer in February. A fifth Deutsche Grammophon album, released internationally in February, 2014, featured the Piano Concerto no. 2 of Sergei Prokofiev and Piano Concerto no. 3 of Sergei Rachmaninov, with Gustavo Dudamel conducting the Simón Bolívar Symphony Orchestra; and in another 2014 release for DGG, she partnered the violinist Leonidas Kavakos in the violin sonatas of Johannes Brahms.

Although there are reports that Wang released a debut CD in 1995, there is little information available about it.

In addition to her audio recordings, EuroArts has released a DVD on which Wang performs Sergei Prokofiev's Piano Concerto No. 3 in C major, with Abbado conducting.

== Sonatas & Etudes (2009) ==
Sonatas & Etudes

Studio album by Yuja Wang
- Released: April 20, 2009
- Recorded: November 2008
- Venues: Friedrich-Ebert-Halle, Hamburg
- Genre: Classical
- Length: 1:14:17
- Label: Deutsche Grammophon
- Producer: Helmut Burk

Sonatas & Etudes is Wang's first CD on general release. It was recorded in November 2008 and released April 20, 2009. It was nominated for the 2010 Grammy Award in the category Best Instrumental Soloist Performance (Without Orchestra). It includes the following tracks:

Frédéric Chopin (1810–1849), Piano Sonata No. 2 in B-flat minor, Op. 35
No.	Title	Length
1.	"1. Grave – Doppio movimento"	7:50
2.	"2. Scherzo"	6:49
3.	"3. Marche funèbre"	8:25
4.	"4. Finale (Presto)"	1:28

György Ligeti (1923–2006), Six Etudes pour Piano, Premier Livre
No.	Title	Length
5.	"Etude no. 4: Fanfares"	3:40

Alexander Scriabin (1872–1915), Piano Sonata No. 2, in G-sharp minor op. 19, "Sonata Fantasy"
No.	Title	Length
6.	"1. Andante"	8:18
7.	"2. Presto"	4:02

György Ligeti (1923–2006)
No.	Title	Length
8.	"Etude no. 10: Der Zauberlehring"	2:15

Franz Liszt (1811–1886) Piano Sonata in B minor, S. 178 (Alfred Cortot, ed.)
No.	Title	Length
9.	"1. Lento assai – Allegro energico – Grandioso-Recitativo"	12:24
10.	"2. Andante sostenuto"	7:45
11.	"3. Allegro energico – Andante sostenuto – Lento assai"	11:04

== Transformation (2010) ==
Transformation

Studio album by Yuja Wang
- Released: April 13, 2010
- Recorded: January 2010
- Venue: Friedrich-Ebert-Halle. Hamburg
- Genre: Classical
- Length: 58:27
- Label: Deutsche Grammophon
- Producer: Helmut Burk

Transformation is Wang's second CD on general release. It was released April 13, 2010 and includes the following tracks:

Igor Stravinsky (1882–1971), Three Movements from Pétrouchka, transcribed for piano solo by the composer
No.	Title	Length
1.	"1. Danse russe. Allegro giusto"	2:30
2.	"2. Chez Pétrouchka"	4:16
3.	"3. La Semaine grasse. Con moto – Allegretto – Tempo giusto – Agitato; The Shrovetide Fair"	8:46

Domenico Scarlatti (1685–1757)
No.	Title	Length
4.	"Sonata in E major K. 380: Andante comodo (Cortège)"	5:28

Johannes Brahms (1833–1897), Variations on a Theme by Paganini Op. 35, Books I & II
No.	Title	Length
5.	"Thema. Non troppo presto"	0:27
6.	"Book 1, Variation 1"	0:24
7.	"Book 1, Variation 2"	0:25
8.	"Book 1, Variation 3"	0:25
9.	"Book 1, Variation 4"	1:00
10.	"Book 1, Variation 5"	0:46
11.	"Book 1, Variation 6"	0:27
12.	"Book 1, Variation 7"	0:28
13.	"Book 1, Variation 8"	0:29
14.	"Book 1, Variation 9"	1:00
15.	"Book 1, Variation 10"	1:23
16.	"Book 1, Variation 11"	1:17
17.	"Book 1, Variation 12"	1:12
18.	"Book 2, Variation 1"	0:43
19.	"Book 2, Variation 2"	0:36
20.	"Book 2, Variation 5"	0:24
21.	"Book 2, Variation 6"	0:21
22.	"Book 2, Variation 7"	0:19
23.	"Book 2, Variation 8"	0:29
24.	"Book 2, Variation 10"	0:41
25.	"Book 2, Variation 11"	0:25
26.	"Book 2, Variation 12"	1:10
27.	"Book 2, Variation 13"	0:56
28.	"Book 2, Variation 3"	0:30
29.	"Book 2, Variation 4"	0:54
30.	"Book 1, Variation 13"	0:32
31.	"Book 1, Variation 14"	2:07

Domenico Scarlatti (1685–1757)
No.	Title	Length
32.	"Sonata in F minor/C major K. 466: Andante moderato"	5:45

Maurice Ravel (1875–1937)
No.	Title	Length
33.	"La Valse, transcribed for piano solo by the composer"	5:28

== Rachmaninov (2011) ==
Rachmaninov

Studio album by Yuja Wang (piano); Mahler Chamber Orchestra, Claudio Abbado (cond.)
- Released: February 25, 2011
- Recorded: April 2010
- Venues: Teatro Comunale, Ferrara
- Genre: Classical
- Length: 56:11
- Label: Deutsche Grammophon

Rachmaninov is Wang's third CD on general release, on the Deutsche Grammophon label. Its recording of Sergei Rachmaninov's Piano Concerto No. 2 features the Mahler Chamber Orchestra conducted by Claudio Abbado. It was released February 25, 2011 and includes the following tracks:

Sergei Rachmaninov (1873–1943), Rhapsody on a Theme of Paganini, Op. 43
No.	Title	Length
1.	"1. Introduction"	0:10
2.	"2. Variation 1"	0:21
3.	"3. Theme"	0:20
4.	"4. Variation 2"	0:20
5.	"5. Variation 3"	0:26
6.	"6. Variation 4"	0:29
7.	"7. Variation 5"	0:29
8.	"8. Variation 6"	1:03
9.	"9. Variation 7"	1:04
10.	"10. Variation 8"	0:35
11.	"11. Variation 9"	0:33
12.	"12. Variation 10"	0:54
13.	"13. Variation 11"	1:16
14.	"14. Variation 12"	1:18
15.	"15. Variation 13"	1:09
16.	"16. Variation 14"	0:45
17.	"17. Variation 15"	1:09
18.	"18. Variation 16"	1:35
19.	"19. Variation 17"	1:36
20.	"20. Variation 18"	2:45
21.	"21. Variation 19"	0:28
22.	"22. Variation 20"	0:37
23.	"23. Variation 21"	0:26
24.	"24. Variation 22"	1:48
25.	"25. Variation 23"	0:53
26.	"26. Variation 24"	1:13

Sergei Rachmaninov, Piano Concerto No. 2 in C minor, Op. 18
No.	Title	Length
27.	"1. Moderato"	10:26
28.	"2. Adagio sostenuto"	11:16
29.	"3. Allegro scherzando"	11:26

== Fantasia (2012) ==
Fantasia

Studio album by Yuja Wang
- Released: March 1, 2012
- Recorded: December 2011
- Venues: Teldex Studio, Berlin
- Genre: Classical
- Length: 1:08:53
- Label: Deutsche Grammophon

Fantasia is Wang's fourth Deutsche Grammophon album. It was released on March 1, 2012 and includes the following tracks:

Sergei Rachmaninov (1873–1943)
No.	Title	Length
1.	"Etudes-Tableaux, Op. 39, No. 6 in A minor"	2:31
2.	"Etudes-Tableaux, Op. 39, No. 4 in B minor"	2:31
3.	"Elegie in E-flat minor, Op. 3, No. 1"	4:45
4.	"Etudes-Tableaux, Op. 39, No. 5 in E-flat minor"	4:37

Domenico Scarlatti (1685–1757)
No.	Title	Length
5.	"Sonata in G major, KK. 455"	1:44

Christoph Willibald Gluck (1714–1787)
No.	Title	Length
6.	"Orfeo ed Euridice (Orphée et Eurydice) (Giovanni Sgambati, arr.), Act 2; Melodie dell'Orfeo"	3:02

Isaac Albéniz (1860–1909)
No.	Title	Length
7.	"Iberia for piano solo, Book 2, No 6; Triana"	5:25

Georges Bizet (1838–1875) / Vladimir Horowitz (1904–1989)
No.	Title	Length
8.	"Variations on a theme from G. Bizet's Carmen (The Gypsy Song Act II); White House version"	3:39

Franz Schubert (1797–1828)
No.	Title	Length
9.	"Gretchen am Spinnrade, D. 118 (arranged by Franz Liszt)"	3:36

Johann Strauss (1825–1899)
No.	Title	Length
10.	"Tritsch-Tratsch-Polka, Op. 214 (arranged by György Cziffra)"	3:20

Frédéric Chopin (1810–1849)
No.	Title	Length
11.	"Waltz No. 7 in C-sharp minor, Op. 64 No. 2; Tempo giusto"	3:49

Paul Dukas (1865–1935)
No.	Title	Length
12.	"L'apprenti sorcier (arranged by Victor Staub)"	9:49

Alexander Scriabin (1872–1915)
No.	Title	Length
13.	"24 Preludes for piano, Op. 11; No. 11 in B major"	1:31
14.	"6 Preludes, Op. 13; No. 6 in B minor"	1:18
15.	"24 Preludes for piano, Op. 11; No. 12 in G-sharp minor"	1:30
16.	"12 Etudes for piano, Op. 8; No. 9 in C-sharp minor"	4:31
17.	"2 Poèmes, Op. 32; Poème No. 2 in F-sharp major"	3:23

Camille Saint-Saëns (1835–1921)
No.	Title	Length
18.	"Danse macabre, op. 40 (arranged by Franz Liszt & Vladimir Horowitz)"	7:52

(iTunes bonus track)
No.	Title	Length
19.	"Tea for Two - (Youmans) - Arrangement by Art Tatum"	3:39

== Piano Concertos / Rachmaninov, Prokofiev (2013) ==
Piano Concertos / Rachmaninov, Prokofiev

Studio album by Yuja Wang (piano)
- Released: October 2013
- Recorded: February 2013
- Venues: Sala Simón Bolívar, Centro de Acción Social por la Música, Caracas
- Genre: Classical
- Length: 1:11:44
- Label: Deutsche Grammophon

Piano Concertos / Rachmaninov, Prokofiev is Wang's fifth Deutsche Grammophon album, scheduled for pre-release in the United States in October 2013, with a general international release January 3, 2014. It includes Wang's performances of piano concertos composed by Sergei Rachmaninov and Sergei Prokofiev, and features the Simón Bolívar Symphony Orchestra of Venezuela, conducted by Gustavo Dudamel. The album comprises the following tracks:

Sergei Rachmaninov (1873–1943), Piano Concerto No. 3 in D minor, Op. 30
No.	Title	Length
1.	"1. Allegro ma non tanto"	15:50
2.	"2. Intermezzo (Adagio)"	10:38
3.	"3. Finale (Alla breve)"	14:17

Sergei Prokofiev (1891–1953), Piano Concerto No. 2 in G minor, Op. 16
No.	Title	Length
4.	"1. Andantino"	11:02
5.	"2. Scherzo (Vivace)"	2:22
6.	"3. Intermezzo (Allegro moderato)"	6:35
7.	"4. Finale (Allegro tempestoso)"	11:00

== Film scores ==
- 2013: Summer in February
- 2023: The Hunger Games: The Ballad of Songbirds & Snakes
