= The Lost Bus (soundtrack) =

The Lost Bus (Soundtrack from the Apple Original Film)

Film score by James Newton Howard
- Released: September 19, 2025
- Studio: Abbey Road Studios, London
- Genre: Film score
- Length: 64:25
- Label: Platoon
- Producer: James Newton Howard, Michael Dean Parsons

James Newton Howard chronology
The Hunger Games: The Ballad of Songbirds & Snakes (2023)	The Lost Bus (2025)

The Lost Bus (Soundtrack from the Apple Original Film) is the film score to the 2025 film The Lost Bus directed by Paul Greengrass starring Matthew McConaughey, America Ferrera, Yul Vazquez and Ashlie Atkinson. The album features original score composed by James Newton Howard with additional music contributed by Michael Dean Parsons and released through Platoon on September 19, 2025.

== Background ==
In October 2024, it was announced that James Newton Howard would compose the film score for The Lost Bus after previously collaborating with Greengrass on News of the World (2020). The score was recorded and mixed at the Abbey Road Studios in London, with additional music contributed by Michael Dean Parsons, who wrote three tracks. The album was released through Platoon, a music distribution platform of Apple Inc. on September 19, 2025, coinciding the film's limited theatrical release.

== Reception ==
James Southall of Movie Wave wrote "Howard mixes growling low-register strings with keyboards and other processed sounds to create a soundscape that succeeds in giving a truly claustrophobic feel, a sense nearly all the time of pressure being applied and then heightened. Sadly as a listening experience on an album, it is deeply unpleasant." Robert Daniels of Screen International called it a "heavy-handed score", and Kyle Smith of The Wall Street Journal "relentlessly bombastic musical score". Steve Pond of TheWrap noted that "James Newton Howard's bold music trails off." Chris Bumbray of JoBlo.com wrote "James Newton Howard's score is suitably intense." Clayton Davis of Variety wrote "James Newton Howard's emotional score and immersive sound design add to the tension." Helen O'Hara of Empire called the score "ominous".

== Plagiarism allegations ==
Despite the reception to the film's music, it sparked criticisms on being allegedly similar to the background music composed by Ravi Basrur for the Prabhas' film Salaar: Part 1 – Ceasefire (2023). The actor's fans noted on how the music from the snippet was similar to that film's background score and recalled on how Basrur got telephone calls from Hollywood producers to compose music for their films, denoting how the film garnered a global influence.

== Track listing ==
No.	Title	Writer(s)	Length
1.	"Electrical Hazard"		4:34
2.	"Embers"		3:30
3.	"All One Fire"		5:01
4.	"Burnover"		6:21
5.	"Radio Down"		4:01
6.	"Gridlocked"		2:40
7.	"No One Here"		5:01
8.	"Looters"		1:52
9.	"I Trust Him"	Michael Dean Parsons	1:13
10.	"No Way Out"		3:19
11.	"Surrounded"		5:10
12.	"Fight Fire or Save Lives"		2:08
13.	"Press Conference"	Michael Dean Parsons	2:02
14.	"It's Not Too Late"	Michael Dean Parsons	2:14
15.	"Escaping Paradise"		4:44
16.	"Reunited"		4:53
17.	"Returning Home"		5:51
