= High Society (2017 film) =

German romantic comedy film

- Theatrical release poster
- Directed by: Anika Decker
- Screenplay by: Anika Decker
- Produced by: Lothar Hellinger; Christopher Doll
- Starring: Marc Benjamin; Emilia Schüle; Jannis Niewöhner; Caro Cult; Iris Berben
- Cinematography: Andreas Berger
- Edited by: Charles Ladmiral; Andrea Mertens
- Music by: Jean-Christoph Ritter; Michael Geldreich; Christoph Bauss
- Production companies: Hellinger / Doll Filmproduktion; Decker Bros. Entertainment; Warner Bros. Film Productions Germany
- Distributed by: Warner Bros. Pictures
- Release date: 14 September 2017
- Running time: 100 minutes
- Country: Germany
- Language: German
- Box office: $10.6 million

High Society is a 2017 German romantic comedy film written and directed by Anika Decker.

== Cast ==
- Marc Benjamin as Ben Schwarz
- Emilia Schüle as Anabel von Schlacht
- Jannis Niewöhner as Yann Kowalski
- Caro Cult as Aura Schlonz
- Iris Berben as Trixi von Schlacht
- Rick Kavanian as PR-Berater Olivjeh
