= Je suis Karl =

2021 German-Czech drama film

- Theatrical release poster
- Directed by: Christian Schwochow
- Screenplay by: Thomas Wendrich
- Produced by: Christoph Friedel; Claudia Steffen
- Starring: Luna Wedler; Jannis Niewöhner
- Cinematography: Frank Lamm
- Edited by: Jens Klüber
- Music by: Floex; Tom Hodge
- Production companies: Pandora Film Produktion; Negativ Film Productions
- Distributed by: Pandora Film Verleih (Germany)
- Release dates: March 2021 (Berlinale); 16 September 2021 (Germany)
- Countries: Germany; Czech Republic
- Language: German

Je suis Karl is a 2021 German-Czech drama film directed by Christian Schwochow, from a screenplay by Thomas Wendrich. It focuses on Maxi, a young woman whose family were victims of a terror attack and who falls in love with Karl, the charismatic leader of a right-wing political movement. The film stars Luna Wedler and Jannis Niewöhner.

== Cast ==
- Luna Wedler as Maxi Baier
- Jannis Niewöhner as Karl
- Milan Peschel as Alex Baier
- Elizaveta Maximová as Isabel
- Marlon Boess as Pankraz
- Aziz Dyab as Yusuf
- Melanie Fouche as Ines Baier

== Release ==
The film had its worldwide premiere at the 71st Berlin International Film Festival in 2021.
