= All the Light We Cannot See (miniseries) =

2023 American historical drama limited series

- Promotional poster
- Genre: Drama
- Based on: All the Light We Cannot See by Anthony Doerr
- Developed by: Steven Knight
- Written by: Steven Knight
- Directed by: Shawn Levy
- Starring: Aria Mia Loberti; Louis Hofmann; Lars Eidinger; Hugh Laurie; Mark Ruffalo; Marion Bailey
- Music by: James Newton Howard
- Country of origin: United States
- Original language: English
- No. of episodes: 4

Production
- Executive producers: Shawn Levy; Dan Levine; Josh Barry; Steven Knight
- Producer: Mary McLaglen
- Cinematography: Tobias A. Schliessler
- Editors: Dean Zimmerman; Casey Cichocki; Jonathan Corn
- Running time: 57 minutes
- Production companies: 21 Laps Entertainment; Nebula Star

Original release
- Network: Netflix
- Release: November 2, 2023

All the Light We Cannot See is an American historical drama television miniseries directed by Shawn Levy and developed by Steven Knight for Netflix. Based on Anthony Doerr's 2014 novel, it stars Aria Mia Loberti, Louis Hofmann, Mark Ruffalo and Hugh Laurie. The four-part series follows the stories of a blind French girl named Marie-Laure and a German soldier named Werner, whose paths cross in occupied France during World War II. The limited series was released on November 2, 2023.

== Premise ==
All the Light We Cannot See follows the lives of two teenagers during the height of World War II: Marie-Laure, a blind French girl and Werner Pfennig, a German boy forced to join and fight for the Nazi regime.

== Cast and characters ==
=== Main ===
- Aria Mia Loberti as Marie-Laure LeBlanc, a blind French teenage girl and the daughter of Daniel LeBlanc
- Louis Hofmann as Unterfeldwebel Werner Pfennig, a German teen who eventually becomes a soldier specializing in detecting and tracking radio frequencies.
- Lars Eidinger as Standartenführer Reinhold von Rumpel, an officer of the SS who certifies and evaluates art, jewelry.
- Hugh Laurie as Étienne LeBlanc, a reclusive World War I veteran suffering from PTSD and the great-uncle of Marie-Laure
- Mark Ruffalo as Daniel LeBlanc, father of Marie-Laure and a locksmith at the Museum of Natural History in Paris
- Marion Bailey as Madame Manec

=== Recurring guest stars ===
- Nell Sutton as young Marie-Laure LeBlanc
- Jakob Diehl as Hauptsturmführer Müller
- Rosie Hilal as Frau Elena
- Felix Kammerer as Scharführer Schmidt
- Andrea Deck as Sandrina
- James Dryden as Monsieur Caron
- Corin Silva as Gefreiter Frank Volkheimer
- Luna Wedler as Jutta Pfennig
- Bernd Hölscher as Oberst Bastian
- Ed Skrein as Obersturmbannführer Rudolf Seidler
- Pascal Ulli as Dr. Heinrich
- Richard Sammel as Dr. Hauptmann
- Rhashan Stone as Professor Hublin, the French museum foreman
- Elizabeth Dulau as Jacqueline
- Sarah Crowden as Madame Blanchard
- Maggie Daniels as Madame Fontineau

== Episodes ==
No.	Title	Directed by	Teleplay by	Original release date
1	"Episode 1"	Shawn Levy	Steven Knight	November 2, 2023
During the Battle of Saint-Malo, blind French teenager Marie-Laure LeBlanc illegally broadcasts excerpts from the novel Twenty Thousand Leagues Under the Seas over a radio. Her broadcasts contain coded messages for the French Resistance, as relayed by her great-uncle Etienne. Werner Pfennig, a teenage German radio operator with the occupying Nazi forces, secretly listens to Marie-Laure's broadcasts without turning her in. A new radio operator is assigned to assist Werner, but Werner kills him to protect Marie-Laure. Reinhold von Rumpel, a Nazi jeweler who believes Marie-Laure's missing father Daniel has left the Sea of Flames, while seeking a cursed diamond rumored to bestow immortality, corners Marie-Laure in a grotto and demands the diamond's location.
2	"Episode 2"	Shawn Levy	Steven Knight	November 2, 2023
Flashbacks to 1940 show that during the Parisian surrender to Germany, Daniel organized the smuggling of valuables out of the Museum of Natural History before fleeing Paris with Marie-Laure to Saint-Malo, and that Werner was recruited into the brutal National Political Institutes of Education after repairing an official's radio. Both of them listened to the broadcasts of a Frenchman called "The Professor". In 1944, Marie-Laure escapes von Rumpel as Werner's superior Müller demands that he uncover her location. They track her to her house.
3	"Episode 3"	Shawn Levy	Steven Knight	November 2, 2023
Etienne and Werner kill Müller and his subordinate. Flashbacks show that Marie-Laure and Daniel, secretly carrying the Sea of Flames, arrive in the Saint-Malo home of their aunt Manec and uncle Etienne, whom Marie-Laure recognizes as the Professor. Daniel measures the town to build a model for Marie-Laure and attracts the attention of the Gestapo. The resistance plans to throw the Germans off his trail, but Daniel is arrested. Meanwhile, after excelling in radio-related tasks at the Institute, Werner is sent to the Eastern Front despite his young age. In 1944, Etienne brings Werner to a Resistance base for a trial and vouches for him. As American forces arrive in Saint-Malo, von Rumpel arrives at Marie-Laure's address.
4	"Episode 4"	Shawn Levy	Steven Knight	November 2, 2023
Ahead of Operation Overlord, Marie-Laure and Etienne begin to collect messages on behalf of the resistance and Manec dies. As Allied forces bombard Saint-Malo, von Rumpel reveals to Marie-Laure that he had tortured and killed Daniel. Meanwhile, Etienne is killed in a blast and asks Werner to protect Marie-Laure. Werner arrives at the house and the two overpower and kill von Rumpel. Marie-Laure takes Werner to Etienne's attic, where Werner broadcasts a message to his sister and the two share a dance. Werner surrenders to the Americans and Marie-Laure throws the Sea of Flames into the sea.

== Production ==
In March 2019, Netflix and 21 Laps Entertainment acquired the rights to develop a limited television series adaptation of the novel with Shawn Levy, Dan Levine and Josh Barry executive producing. In September 2021, it was announced that Netflix had given the production a series order consisting of four episodes, with Steven Knight writing the series and Levy directing all episodes. In December 2021, it was announced that Aria Mia Loberti would play as Marie-Laure.

In January 2022, it was announced that both Mark Ruffalo and Hugh Laurie joined the cast, set as leads opposite Loberti. Ruffalo is set to portray Daniel LeBlanc, while Laurie will portray Etienne LeBlanc. In February 2022, it was announced that Louis Hofmann, Lars Eidinger and Nell Sutton joined the cast. Filming took place between March and July 2022 in Budapest, Saint-Malo and Villefranche-de-Rouergue (Aveyron department, south of France), with the main scenes (street, bombings, Saint-Malo liberation) being filmed in the latter. This town was chosen for its ancient central square similar to Saint-Malo's before the World War II destruction, and for its familiar 1940s style streets. The shooting in Villefranche-de-Rouergue took place from July 5 to 20, 2022. A large part of the town was adapted for all production needs.

== Music ==
Composer James Newton Howard wrote the musical score for the series.

== Release ==
On April 18, 2023, first look photos and the first teaser trailer for the series were released. It was also announced that the series was scheduled to be released on November 2, 2023.

== Differences from the book ==
Etienne, Marie-Laure’s great uncle, died in the series. However, he was jailed in the book, and after the Battle of Saint-Malo, he was reunited with Marie-Laure.

Werner's extended backstory in the book from his childhood and training with the Nazi was condensed at the start of the series. Near the end of the series, his role in saving Marie-Laure was also significantly altered. In the book, he killed Reinhold von Rumpel to protect Marie-Laure. In the series, however, Werner fought with von Rumpel to ensure he did not find Marie-Laure, but she was the one to eventually shoot him.

Another key difference is the extended encounter and a moment of romance between the two main characters, which did not happen in the book. In the book, Marie-Laure and Werner met only for a short time after he saved her at her hideout and before he was captured by the Allied Soldiers. In the series, they instead had more than a few hours together at her place, where they had a slow dance and a kiss. Author Anthony Doerr has shared that over the years he had received feedbacks from "lots of readers" reflecting their disappointment at the brief encounter of the two main characters near the end of the story, which had been built up throughout their separate storylines in the book. He saw the miniseries as a remedy for this to the fans of the original story who wanted more.

In addition, the series ended after the teenage Marie-Laure threw the Sea of Flames stone into the ocean. In the book, the storyline moved on to decades later, when the old Marie-Laure, now once again living in Paris, received from Werner's sister Jutta the miniature house containing her key. As a result, Jutta and Marie-Laure never cross paths in the series.

== Reception ==
The review aggregator website Rotten Tomatoes reported a 28% approval rating with an average rating of 5.1/10, based on 65 critic reviews. The website's critics consensus reads, "While All the Light We Cannot See has a bright cast, its potential is often snuffed out by a tonally awkward blend of serious and silly." Metacritic, which uses a weighted average, assigned a score of 36 out of 100 based on 26 critics, indicating "generally unfavorable" reviews.

The decision to cast a legally blind actress to play the role of the main character Marie-Laure was praised for its breakthrough representation of blind and low-vision performers. Critics also praised the casting choice of Aria Mia Loberti as Marie-Laure and the visuals, but felt it fell short of capturing the depth and nuance of the source material. Particularly criticized were the characterization and dialogue, with some feeling that the adaptation missed the mark in exploring the complexities of its Nazi-affiliated protagonist.
