= Biohackers =

German television series

- Genre: Techno-thriller; Science fiction; Drama
- Created by: Christian Ditter
- Screenplay by: Tanja Bubbel; Nikolaus Schulz-Dornburg; Johanna Thalmann
- Directed by: Christian Ditter; Tim Trachte
- Starring: Luna Wedler; Jessica Schwarz; Thomas Prenn; Adrian Julius Tillmann; Jing Xiang; Caro Cult; Sebastian Jakob Doppelbauer
- Composer: Fil Eisler
- Country of origin: Germany
- Original language: German
- No. of seasons: 2
- No. of episodes: 12

Production
- Producers: Uli Putz; Jakob Claussen
- Running time: 41–47 minutes
- Production company: Claussen+Putz Filmproduktion

Original release
- Network: Netflix
- Release: 20 August 2020 – 9 July 2021

Biohackers is a German techno-thriller television series created by Christian Ditter that premiered on Netflix on 20 August 2020. A week after its release, the series was renewed for a second season, which was released on 9 July 2021.

== Synopsis ==
Mia Akerlund is a medical student at the University of Freiburg, where she meets Jasper, a talented biology student, and Niklas, his somewhat strange roommate. She is very interested in biohacking technology and becomes involved in the world of illegal genetic experimentation. Mia is also trying to investigate the cause of her brother's death. When she learns of breakthrough biohacking research results which have landed in the wrong hands, Mia has to decide whether to protect her friends or avenge her brother's death.

== Cast and characters ==
=== Main ===
- Luna Wedler as Emma "Mia Akerlund" Engels
- Jessica Schwarz as Professor Tanja Lorenz
- Thomas Prenn as Niklas
- Adrian Julius Tillmann as Jasper
- Jing Xiang as Chen-Lu
- Caro Cult as Lotta
- Sebastian Jakob Doppelbauer as Ole

=== Recurring ===
- Edith Saldanha as Monique
- Zeynep Bozbay as Petra Eller
- Benno Fürmann as Andreas Winter
- Thomas Kretschmann as Baron von Fürstenberg (season 2)

== Episodes ==
Series	Episodes	Originally released
1	6	20 August 2020
2	6	9 July 2021

=== Season 1 (2020) ===
No. overall	No. in season	Title	Directed by	Original release date
1	1	"Arrival"	Christian Ditter	20 August 2020
A cold open has Mia and Niklas traveling together by train. Several passengers suddenly fall ill. Mia, a medical student, tries to give aid. The episode resumes two weeks earlier, at the University of Freiburg. Mia is moving into an apartment with several other students—Lotta, a pretty girl who likes to party; Ole, a goofy biohacker; and Chen-Lu, a rapid-talking molecular biology aficionado. Mia encounters the famous Professor Lorenz in an introductory med class. Lorenz proclaims that synthetic biology is the future of medicine. Mia has a flashback to her childhood, with her brother being rushed into an emergency room. On the PA system, she hears, "Dr. Lorenz to the ER please". After class, Mia pursues Jasper, Lorenz's assistant. After a few dates, he shows Mia his personal lab, located in a cabin in the woods. A former colleague of Lorenz turned journalist, Andreas Winter, is introduced. The episode ends with a flash forward to the train carriage, where Mia tells a medic in a hazmat suit that her name is Emma.
2	2	"Secrets"	Christian Ditter	20 August 2020
As the episode opens, Mia is having a flashback to childhood. She and her brother had participated in one of Lorenz's studies and the boy had died. Mia convinces Lorenz to hire her as an assistant on human clinical trials. In another flashback, Mia sees the car accident that killed her parents, and she remembers Lorenz being present at the scene. At school, while taking swabs from students, Mia remembers Lorenz taking swabs from her and her brother. Mia switches her own sample to hide her identity from Lorenz. As the episode ends, the professor gives Mia a key card to the lab.
3	3	"Suspicion"	Christian Ditter	20 August 2020
At the lab, Mia discovers that her brother's medical records are archived at Lorenz's house. She goes there with Jasper and discovers information about Project "Homo Deus". Searching for Jasper, she finds him in a secret basement lab that houses a vivarium filled with red-eyed mosquitoes he has created. Jasper suddenly falls ill with an attack related to Huntington's disease. Mia calls Chen-Lu, who comes and saves Jasper. In the flash-forward at the end, Jasper is on the train that is also carrying Mia and Niklas, and he releases mosquitoes from a jar.
4	4	"Certainty"	Christian Ditter	20 August 2020
Mia is forced to explain to Niklas, Jasper's roommate, what she has found out about her childhood and Lorenz's involvement in it. The two travel to Basel, Switzerland, to speak to a technician who wrote up Lorenz's research. He tells them everything, and Mia decides to ruin the professor.
5	5	"Betrayal"	Christian Ditter	20 August 2020
Mia confronts Lorenz and reveals that she is Emma Engels. The incredulous professor performs a DNA test and is excited to find out her Homo Deus project was not a complete failure. She discovers that the genetic modifications she had performed on the girl gave her an exceptional immune system, demonstrating a revolutionary new gene therapy. Mia is determined to expose Lorenz for having performed unethical research and causing her brother's death. Later, she takes a train to Berlin with Niklas, sending a text to a mysterious recipient. Neither of them notices Jasper sitting nearby with his jar of mosquitoes.
6	6	"Fate"	Christian Ditter	20 August 2020
Mia wakes up on the train after the genetically altered mosquitoes infect everyone with a virus. Suspected of being the perpetrator, she is apprehended, but manages to escape and arranges to meet her roommates at Jasper's lab. They create antibodies to the virus, and Mia brings it to the hospital to treat the victims. Collecting all the data she has gathered on Lorenz's research, Mia meets with her anonymous contact, who turns out to be Andreas Winter. She is snatched and thrown into a waiting van, where she finds Lorenz, also tied up.

=== Season 2 (2021) ===
This is a caption
No. overall	No. in season	Title	Directed by	Written by	Original release date
7	1	"Awake"	Christian Ditter	Christian Ditter	9 July 2021
Mia awakes at the university lab, disoriented and unsure of her surroundings. She quickly realizes that things have changed, and she has no memory of the past three months. Her old apartment is empty, Jasper informs her that they are a couple, Niklas refuses to speak to her, and her roommates tell her she has been different lately. Medical tests show her to be in perfect health, though she discovers a strange tattoo on her arm. Brief memory flashes reveal events that occurred at the end of the first season, and Mia begins to reconstruct what she has forgotten in order to make sense of her new reality.
8	2	"Enemies"	Christian Ditter	Christian Ditter	9 July 2021
Mia finds herself in the apartment of Niklas, in Strasbourg. She attempts to reconcile with him, but he pushes her away. After trying unsuccessfully to obtain information about Tanja Lorenz at the university, she speaks with her roommate Ole, who happens to know where the disgraced professor resides. Mia goes to confront her old nemesis, who now lives with her mother and awaits a possible conviction for conducting illegal scientific work. The encounter doesn't go well, and Mia leaves empty-handed. Her roommate Lotta receives a mysterious phone call and later invites Mia to meet her parents. Mia accepts, and as she is walking outside with her three roommates, she receives a call from Lorenz, who appears to have changed her mind about helping her understand what happened.
9	3	"Partners"	Tim Trachte	Christian Ditter	9 July 2021
Mia has been forewarned by Lorenz that Lotta's father, Baron von Fürstenberg, was the one funding all her research. The baron invites Mia to a gala he is holding, but she declines. She is accosted in the bathroom by Lotta's brother, who claims they are an item. Having learned from Lorenz that the baron has a red book where he keeps all his notes, Mia decides to go to the gala after all, accompanied by Jasper. Once there, she sneaks into the baron's office but instead of finding the book, she discovers the notes her therapist has been taking about her the whole time. On her way out, she spots the man who kidnapped her at the end of the first season, Andreas Winter. As she and Jasper are leaving the baron's compound, their car is stopped by security and Winter appears at Mia's window.
10	4	"Forget"	Tim Trachte	Miriam Rechel	9 July 2021
After having her bag searched by Andreas Winter at the von Fürstenberg residence gate, Mia decides to spend the night with Jasper. The next morning, she has another memory flashback and returns to the hospital, where she is told by the neurologist that she has a rapidly degenerative form of Creutzfeldt–Jakob disease and not much longer to live. Mia believes her condition is reversible and based on a memory, she realizes that it is Winter who has the red book. Together with Jasper and Lorenz, she concocts a plan to steal this from him. The episode ends with Jasper visiting the baron and telling him they have a problem.
11	5	"Find"	Tim Trachte	Tanja Bubbel	9 July 2021
Jasper distracts the baron by telling him that Mia is on to him, while she goes in search of the lab. The baron summons Winter. Having found the secret location where she was experimented upon, Mia, whose health condition is deteriorating, calls Lorenz and shows her what she found on Winter's laptop. Meanwhile, Jasper is captured and dragged to the lab. Back at the apartment, Lotta discovers what Mia is up to and tries to get hold of her father. She confronts her roommates and tells them they have to move out. At the lab, Winter attempts to inject Jasper with the memory-erasing serum he has developed, and Mia interrupts him. A struggle ensues, leading to an explosion that knocks them both out.
12	6	"Remember"	Tim Trachte	Christian Ditter	9 July 2021
Mia and Jasper escape the lab through a ventilation shaft after setting off the fire alarm. Lotta arrives at the estate and sees Winter being brought out on a stretcher by emergency personnel. She finds the lab, and her father lets her in on a family secret. Jasper and Mia go to the university research centre, where Lorenz attempts to reverse Mia's degenerative condition using a brain interface. When she awakens, she sees Jasper, Ole, Chen-Lu, Lorenz, and Monique tied up and held at gunpoint by Lotte. She wrestles with the baron and they both fall from the second floor. Mia awakes in the hospital surrounded by her friends, while von Fürstenberg, fighting for his life in the ICU, gives his offspring one last mission. Mia travels to meet Lorenz in the countryside, and as they realize they have been tricked, Lorenz is shot in the abdomen and dies. The episode ends with Mia driving off in a rental van.

== Production ==
In addition to the original location at the University of Freiburg, the majority of the first season was filmed in studios in Munich. Principal photography began in May 2019 and wrapped up in September 2019.

The production was partially funded with at least €400,000 from the German Motion Picture Fund and the Bavarian media promotion company FilmFernsehFonds Bayern, which had also partly funded the Netflix series Dark.

== Release ==
The first season's six episodes were originally scheduled to be released on 30 April 2020. However, Netflix decided to postpone the launch due to the public's focus on the spread of COVID-19, as some scenes from the show could be misconstrued as references to the pandemic. 20 August 2020 was selected as the new release date.

== Reception ==
In a balanced review of the series, Elsa Sotiriadis of Singularity Hub writes, "...the unconventional pieces sometimes move smoothly together and sometimes clash, but the plot is glued together with lots of visually appealing synthetic biology experiments and bioluminescent matter of diverse natures." Additionally, she says, "...don't expect the show to offer deep scientific insights or riveting character arcs, because biohacking is only the backdrop of a revenge plot that feels somewhat rushed."

The journal Science published a positive review of the show, noting that it accurately presents laboratory scenes of complex molecular biology, though these are necessarily rushed. The review also considered the dialogue about gene therapies and antidotes to be consistent with how RNA interference therapies work. The show also addresses many concerns about genomic data and genetic engineering, and the motivating drive behind do-it-yourself biology.
