= Aria Mia Loberti =

American actress (born 1994)

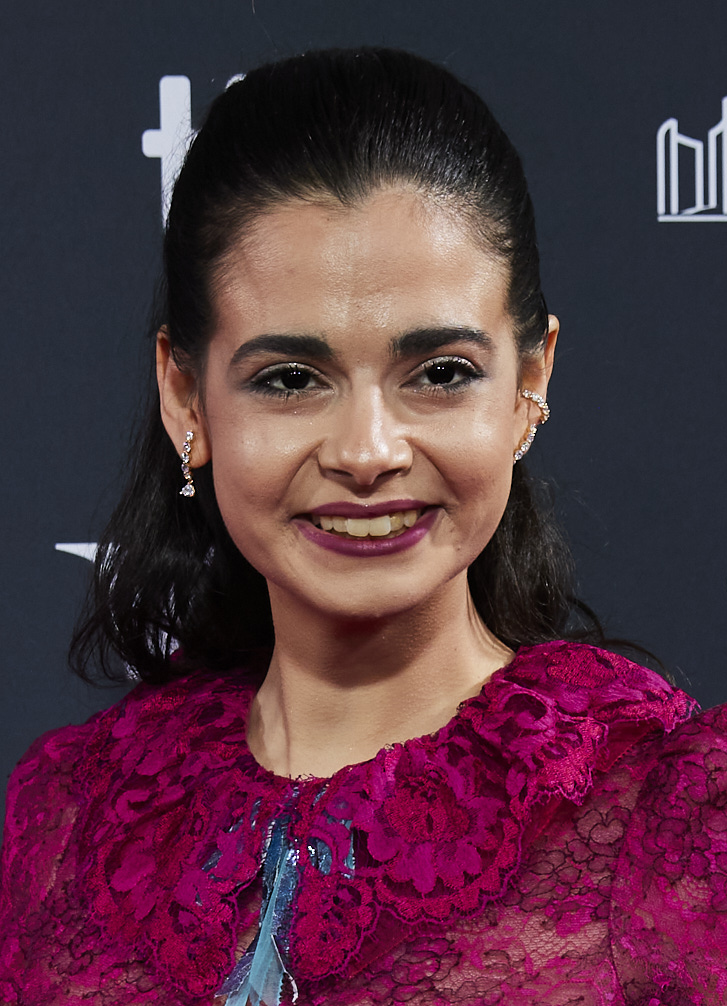
- Loberti in 2024
- Born: 1994 (age 31–32)
- Occupations: Actress; author

Aria Mia Loberti (born 1994) is an American actress and author. She is known for portraying Marie-Laure Leblanc in the Netflix miniseries All the Light We Cannot See (2023).

== Early life and education ==
Aria Mia Loberti was born and raised into an Italian-American family in Johnston, Rhode Island. She was homeschooled online from the third through twelfth grades. As a child and teen, she trained intensively in classical ballet at the preprofessional level. She also trained in martial arts and holds a yoga teaching certification, working as a certified yoga teacher throughout college.

Loberti attended the University of Rhode Island from 2016 to 2020. She graduated summa cum laude with three majors — Philosophy, Communication Studies, and Political Science — and minors in Ancient Greek language and Rhetoric, and completed the Honors Program. She received her master's degree in ancient rhetoric with distinction in 2021 from Royal Holloway, University of London on a Fulbright Scholarship. She started her doctoral studies in ancient rhetoric at Pennsylvania State University in 2021, when she began to question her career path. She then responded on a whim to an All The Light We Cannot See open global casting search posted online, which, after booking the role, led her to pursue acting as a full time career.

== Career ==
=== Acting ===
Loberti’s first acting role was as the lead character of Marie-Laure Leblanc in Netflix's adaptation of the 2014 novel All the Light We Cannot See. It was also her first audition. Her performance has been universally praised by critics, described as "graceful and affecting", "luminous", "resonant, [and] captivating", and a "radiant…good and pure presence that grounds the series' sense of jeopardy". Her co-star Mark Ruffalo referred to her as "a revelation". Loberti, who has a form of the genetic eye condition achromatopsia, landed the part after a global search for an actor who was blind or had low-vision. A fan of the book, she auditioned after learning about the search from a childhood teacher. Despite no acting training, Loberti beat out thousands of submissions to secure the role three weeks after she sent in her self tape. Director Shawn Levy stated of Loberti: "I didn't know what she had acted in, I didn't know what her training was, all I knew is that there was a combination of intelligence, which was extremely self-evident, and a luminous quality on camera… I later found out that not only was she new to acting—she had never even auditioned before." She received a Rising Star Award at the 2023 Toronto International Film Festival and an Entertainment Weekly Breaking Big Award at the 2023 SCAD Savannah Film Festival. She was nominated for Best Breakthrough Performance at the 2024 Film Independent Spirit Awards.

In September 2023, it was announced that Loberti would serve as the new face of the beauty and skincare brand L'Occitane en Provence. In November 2023, it was announced that she would narrate a new audiobook version of Jules Verne's Twenty Thousand Leagues Under the Sea. ln 2024, she appeared in the television adaptation of The Spiderwick Chronicles as the magical fencing maestro Valentina and on Grey’s Anatomy as Vida Madeira.

Through social media in early 2025, she reported her eyesight has been largely corrected. She stated that, because of this, she will no longer be portraying characters who were blind or have low vision in any of her future acting projects, but that she is passionate about continuing her advocacy for that community.

=== Writing ===
Loberti’s first book, a children’s picture book called I Am Ingrid, will be published by Scholastic in October of 2025. She has also stated that she authored a middle grade fantasy novel alongside her best friend, which has yet to have a publication date.

== Activism ==
Loberti is also a human rights activist and began speaking up for her own and others' educational and accessibility rights at just four years old. On April 18, 2024, Loberti was announced as the newest UNICEF Ambassador. She has been an active supporter of UNICEF since 2022 and has traveled with the organization specifically to support educational rights, children’s literacy access, and climate change efforts.

== Filmography ==
Year	Title	Role	Notes	Ref.
2023	All the Light We Cannot See	Marie-Laure LeBlanc	Miniseries, acting debut	
2024	Grey's Anatomy	Vida Madera	Episode: "Baby Can I Hold You"	
2024	The Spiderwick Chronicles	Valentina	5 episodes	
