= Jing Xiang (actress) =

Chinese German actress

- Born: 12 February 1993 (age 33); Berlin, Germany
- Education: Rostock University of Music and Theatre
- Occupation: Actress
- Years active: 2018–present
- Known for: Biohackers

Chinese name
- Traditional Chinese: 項晶
- Simplified Chinese: 项晶
- Literal meaning: Crystal Neck
Transcriptions
Standard Mandarin
- Hanyu Pinyin: Xiàng Jīng
- Bopomofo: ㄒㄧㄤˋ ㄐㄧㄥ
- Gwoyeu Romatzyh: Shianq Jing
- Wade–Giles: Hsiang4 Ching1
- Tongyong Pinyin: Siang4 Jing1
- Yale Romanization: Syang4 Jing1
- IPA: [ɕjâŋ tɕíŋ]
Yue: Cantonese
- Yale Romanization: Hohng Jīng
- Jyutping: Hong6 Zing1
- Sidney Lau: Hong6 Jing1
- Canton Romanization: Hong6 Jing1
- IPA: [hɔŋ˨ tsɪŋ˥]

Jing Xiang (German pronunciation: [jɪŋ ksjaŋ]; Chinese: 项晶; pinyin: Xiàng Jīng; born 12 February 1993) is a Chinese German actress.

== Biography ==
Jing Xiang was born in Berlin. She speaks native German and Chinese, and speaks English as a foreign language. From 2009 to 2012 she took acting, dancing and singing lessons at the Academy art school in Berlin-Kreuzberg. In 2012 she graduated from the Paul-Natorp-Gymnasium in Berlin-Friedenau with an Abitur. Afterwards she studied at the Rostock University of Music and Theatre, graduating in 2017 with an Artist Diploma. During her studies Xiang had guest performances at the Rostock People's Theatre.

Xiang became a member of the Schauspielhaus Bochum ensemble in 2018. Among other roles, she played the first gravedigger in Johan Simons’ Hamlet production, which had been invited to the 57th Berliner Theatertreffen. Xiang also took a role in a Tatort episode and in a Joyn series. She became known to a larger audience through the Netflix series Biohackers, in which she plays the role of Chen-Lu.

== Filmography ==
Year	Title	Role
2018	Tatort: Wir kriegen euch alle	Chi Ling
2020	Aus dem Tagebuch eines Uber-Fahrers	Fen
2020–2021	Biohackers	Chen-Lu
2024–present	Beasts Like Us	Raffi
