= The Hunger Games: The Ballad of Songbirds & Snakes (score) =

The Hunger Games: The Ballad of Songbirds & Snakes (Original Motion Picture Score)

Film score by James Newton Howard featuring Yuja Wang
- Released: November 17, 2023
- Recorded: AIR Studios, London
- Genres: Orchestral; classical
- Length: 87:06
- Label: Sony Masterworks
- Producer: James Newton Howard

James Newton Howard chronology
All the Light We Cannot See (2023)	The Hunger Games: The Ballad of Songbirds & Snakes (Original Motion Picture Score) (2023)	The Lost Bus (2025)

Singles from The Hunger Games: The Ballad of Songbirds & Snakes (Original Motion Picture Score)
- 1. "Mercy" Released: November 7, 2023

The Hunger Games: The Ballad of Songbirds & Snakes (Original Motion Picture Score) is the score album to the 2023 film The Hunger Games: The Ballad of Songbirds & Snakes. James Newton Howard composed the film's score, whose album consisted of 40 tracks and featured pianist Yuja Wang in three of them. The soundtrack was released by Sony Masterworks on November 17, 2023.

== Background ==
In July 2022, franchise regular James Newton Howard returned to collaborate for the fifth film, after scoring the previous installments. Although he intended to reuse thematic materials from the predecessors, he instead wrote "fresh" and "original" music as the prequel is a "brand new entry" in the franchise. The score album consists of 40 tracks.

The score was recorded at the AIR Studios in London, during May and June 2023. Chinese pianist Yuja Wang is the featuring artist in the album. The soundtrack was preceded with "Mercy" as the lead single, released on November 7, 2023.

At the same month, it was also announced that the soundtrack would be released on double LPs with the 40-track score being pressed on 180-gram red and gold-colored vinyl discs that covered in a gatefold sleeve and included a four-page booklet that contained stills from the film. It is set to be released in February 2024.

== Reception ==
Zanobard Reviews wrote "James Newton Howard’s Ballad Of Songbirds & Snakes score reprises those classic Hunger Games motifs you know and love and… that’s about it really. Save one or two thunderous moments and a half-decent though sadly underutilised theme for Lucy Gray Baird, there just isn’t much else to remark about." Filmtracks.com wrote "The lack of this score's new themes performed in these tracks is an oddity as well, almost like an admission from the composer that they cannot attract the same appeal of the franchise's prior identities. At the very least, Lucy's theme should have been included here, along with the Mockingjay one prominently heard several times in the score. Casual Howard enthusiasts will likely want The Ballad of Songbirds & Snakes to be more than it is, a competent but ultimately unengaging echo of better times."

David Rooney of The Hollywood Reporter wrote "The orchestral thunder of James Newton Howard’s score marries well with Lucy Gray’s songs, in which executive music producer Dave Cobb crafts rousing tunes around Collins’ lyrics, adding fire to the heroine's rebel spirit." Jen A. Hughes and Monique I. Vebocky of The Harvard Crimson wrote "With the same composer as the original films, James Newton Howard, it is no surprise that the film features impressive orchestral movements. One delightfully unexpected aspect of the film’s music, however, was the direct sampling of a few of the past film’s themes [...] As a book adaptation, the film’s score has the power to add additional nuance to the story described in Collin's novel, and Howard’s approach takes full advantage of this affordance. The film’s direct matching of themes from all four previous films with scenes in the newest one is a moving and thoughtful continuation of the franchise’s signature movements."

== Track listing ==
No.	Title	Artist(s)	Length
1.	"The Dark Days"		1:55
2.	"Anthem: Gem of Panem"		0:43
3.	"Coryo in the Capitol"		0:44
4.	"Assigning the Mentors"	James Newton Howard & Yuja Wang	2:38
5.	"Meet the Mentor"		2:01
6.	"Gamemaker"		1:20
7.	"Sejanus"	Howard & Wang	1:58
8.	"Hunger Is a Weapon"		2:43
9.	"Strategy"	Howard & Wang	2:06
10.	"Department of War"		3:39
11.	"The Arena"		2:06
12.	"Saving Snow"		1:23
13.	"Ideas Firing"	Howard & Wang	4:23
14.	"Happy Hunger Games"	Howard & Wang	3:29
15.	"Mercy"		2:21
16.	"Seize the Opportunity"		1:18
17.	"Cut the Feed"	Howard & Wang	1:27
18.	"Open the Gate"	Howard & Wang	3:46
19.	"Powerful"		1:44
20.	"Afraid of Water"		1:18
21.	"Drone Attack"		3:20
22.	"Inside the Duct"		1:03
23.	"Under the Flag"		2:55
24.	"Planting the Cloth"	Howard & Wang	3:37
25.	"Rainbow of Destruction"		1:13
26.	"Get Her Out"		3:44
27.	"The Sound of Snow"		1:59
28.	"Your Life Has Just Begun"		1:03
29.	"You Are Safe"		1:46
30.	"Trust Is Everything"		1:20
31.	"I Can't Stay Here"		1:42
32.	"Cabin in the Rain"		1:31
33.	"Lucy?"		2:26
34.	"The Woods"		1:09
35.	"Change of Plan"		2:03
36.	"Passed the Tests"	Howard & Wang	3:36
37.	"Snow Lands on Top"		3:29
38.	"Three Solos for Yuja: I. Friendship"	Yuja Wang	2:05
39.	"Three Solos for Yuja: II. Rue's Farewell"	Yuja Wang	2:03
40.	"Three Solos for Yuja: III. Victor"	Yuja Wang	2:00
Total length:			87:06

== Accolades ==
Award	Date of Ceremony	Category	Recipient(s)	Result	Ref
Hollywood Music in Media Awards	November 15, 2023	Original Score — Sci-Fi/Fantasy Film	James Newton Howard	Nominated	

== Release history ==
Release dates and formats for The Hunger Games: The Ballad of Songbirds & Snakes (Original Motion Picture Score)
Region	Date	Format(s)	Label	Ref.
Various	November 17, 2023	Digital download; streaming	Sony Masterworks	
Various	February 2, 2024	Vinyl	Sony Masterworks	
