= Paula (2016 film) =

2016 film

- Directed by: Christian Schwochow
- Written by: Stefan Kolditz; Stephen Suschke
- Produced by: Christoph Friedel; Ingelore Köning; Claudia Steffen
- Starring: Carla Juri; Albrecht Schuch; Roxane Duran
- Cinematography: Frank Lamm
- Edited by: Jens Klüber
- Music by: Jean Rondeau
- Release date: 7 August 2016 (LFF)
- Running time: 123 minutes
- Country: Germany
- Language: German

Paula is a 2016 German biographical film directed by Christian Schwochow. The film depicts pioneering female painter Paula Modersohn-Becker.

== Cast ==
- Carla Juri - Paula Modersohn-Becker
- Albrecht Schuch - Otto Modersohn
- Roxane Duran - Clara Westhoff
- Joel Basman - Rainer Maria Rilke
- Stanley Weber - Georges
- Marco Massafra - Hans am Ende
- Nicki von Tempelhoff - Fritz Mackensen
