= Caro Cult =

German actress (born 1994)

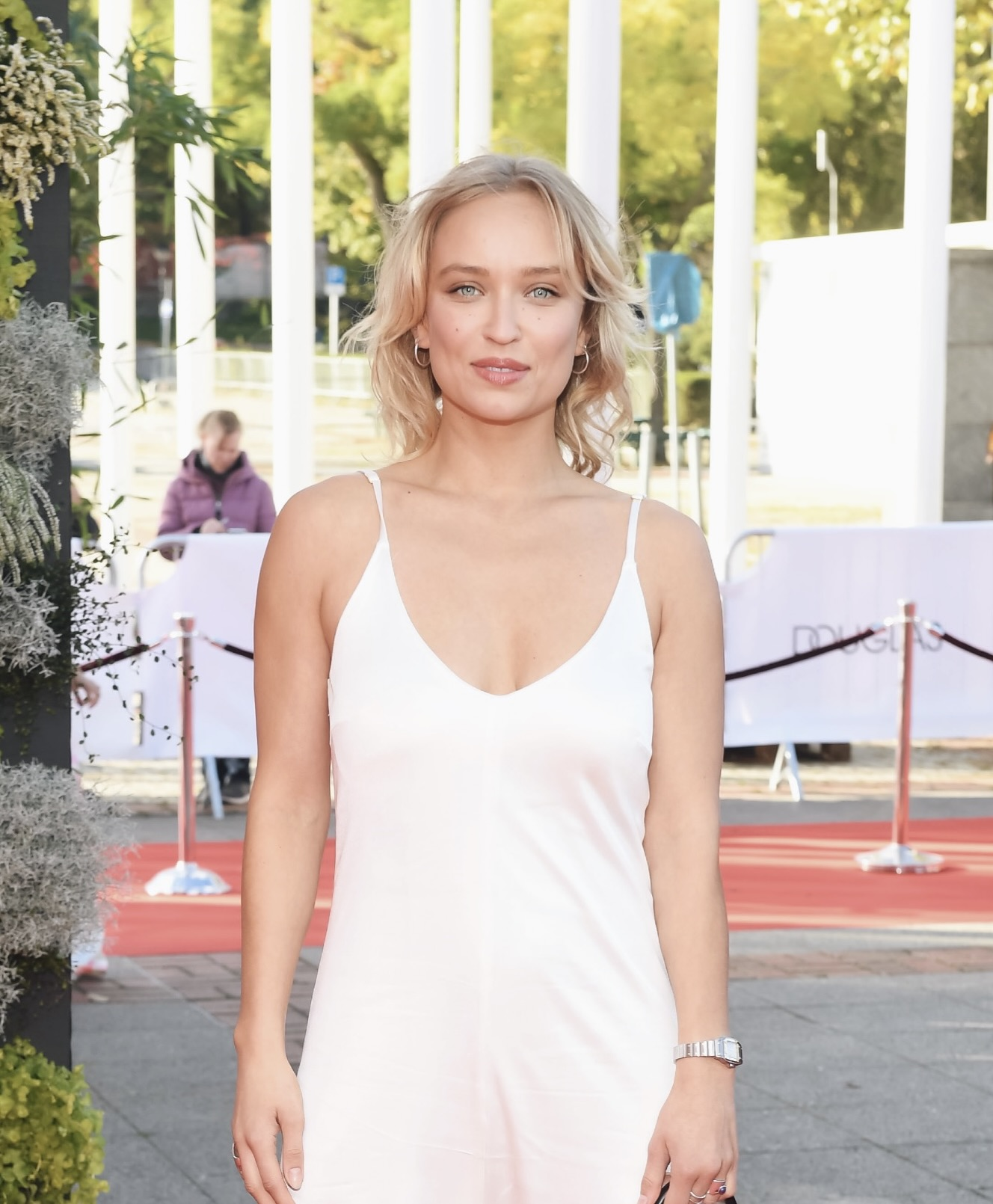
- Cult in 2021
- Born: 27 June 1994 (age 30); Hanover, Germany
- Occupation: Actress
- Known for: Biohackers

Caro Cult (born 27 June 1994) is a German actress. She gained popularity in 2020 by starring in the Netflix series Biohackers.

== Life and career ==
Caro Cult grew up near Hanover. She attended a school in Isernhagen until, at the age of fourteen, she moved with her parents to Bad Nenndorf, where she went to high school and took drama classes. In 2012, she moved to Berlin to pursue an artistic career. She shot several music videos and short films, and later worked extensively with photographer Oliver Rath. She appeared on the cover of his book Berlin Bohème, which brought her attention from the international art scene.

Cult has had supporting roles in films such as Fucking Berlin and Gut zu Vögeln, as well as appearing in a number of television series, including Notruf Hafenkante, Einstein, Babylon Berlin, and Tatort. In 2020, she landed a major role in the Netflix series Biohackers.

== Personal life ==
Cult is vegan and a member of PETA.

== Filmography ==
=== Film ===
List of film appearances, with year, title, and role shown
Year	Title	Role	Notes
2016	Fucking Berlin	Gretchen	
2016	Gut zu Vögeln	Nanou	
2017	High Society	Aura	

=== Television ===
List of television appearances, with year, title, and role shown
Year	Title	Role	Notes
2019	Notruf Hafenkante		1 episode
2019	Einstein		1 episode
2020	Babylon Berlin	Vera	5 episodes
2020	Tatort	Jule Gajewski	1 episode
2020	Biohackers	Lotta	Lead role
