= Allegro Pastell =

2026 German drama film

- Promotional poster
- Directed by: Anna Roller
- Written by: Leif Randt
- Based on: Allegro Pastell by Leif Randt
- Produced by: Tobias Walker; Philipp Worm
- Starring: Jannis Niewöhner; Luna Wedler; Martina Gedeck
- Cinematography: Felix Pflieger
- Production companies: Walker +Worm; ARD Degeto Film GmbH [de]; BR Bayerischer Rundfunk [de]
- Distributed by: DCM Film Distribution
- Release dates: 14 February 2026 (Berlinale); 16 April 2026 (Theatres)
- Running time: 99 minutes
- Country: Germany
- Language: German

Allegro Pastell is a 2026 German drama film directed by Anna Roller, written by Leif Randt and based on the 2020 novel of the same name by Randt. Starring Jannis Niewöhner and Sylvaine Faligant, it follows novelist Tanja Arnheim and web designer Jerome Daimler, who are maintaining a seemingly ideal long-distance relationship.

The film had its world premiere at the Panorama section of the 76th Berlin International Film Festival on 14 February 2026. It will be theatrically released in Germany by DCM Film Distribution on 16 April.

== Cast ==
- Jannis Niewöhner as Jerome Daimler
- Sylvaine Faligant as Tanja Arnheim
- Luna Wedler as Sarah Arnheim, Tanja's sister
- Martina Gedeck as Ulla Arnheim, Tanja's mother
- Wolfram Koch as Konstantin Arnheim, Tanja's father
- Haley Louise Jones as Marlene Seidl
- Vera Flück as Amelie
- Nico Ehrenteit as Jannis
- Jacob Schreier as Julian
- Kate Strong as Hannah Daimler, Jerome's mother
- Steven Preisner as Bob

== Production ==
Principal photography began on 28 May 2024 on locations in Berlin, Brandenburg, Frankfurt am Main, Lissabon in Germany. The project was supported by Medienboard Berlin-Brandenburg, MFG Baden-Württemberg, German Federal Film Board (DFFF), FFA: German Federal Film Funding and Hessen Film financially.

== Release ==
Allegro Pastell had its world premiere in the Panorama section of the 76th Berlin International Film Festival on 14 February 2026.

It will be released in German theatres by DCM Film Distribution on 16 April 2026.

France based Totem Films have acquired the international sales rights of the film in May 2025.

== Accolades ==
Award	Ceremony Date	Category	Recipient	Result	Ref.
Berlin International Film Festival	22 February 2026	Panorama Audience Award for Best Feature Film	Anna Roller	Nominated	
