= Satel Film =

Austrian Media Company

Satel Film is an Austrian TV and film production and distribution company, founded in 1971 by Michael Wolkenstein and based in Vienna. Its documentaries, TV series and shorts include Kottan ermittelt, Schlosshotel Orth, the biopics Andreas Hofer and (as a co-production) Brecht, thriller Opernball, the TV films Heilerin I and Heilerin II and the police procedural SOKO Donau, released in Germany as SOKO Wien.

== History ==
Satel Film was founded as a film production company in 1971 by former Sascha-Film management director Michael Wolkenstein.
