= European Film Actor School =

Acting school in Zürich, Switzerland

Coordinates: 47.3589°N 8.5202°E

- Type: Drama school
- Established: 1990; 36 years ago
- Founders: Rolf Sarkis
- Location: Zurich, Switzerland
- Website: www.efasfilmactorschool.org

The European Film Actor School (EFAS) is an educational establishment located in Zurich, Switzerland. It was founded in 1990 in Richterswil by Rolf Sarkis.

EFAS was focused on film and television acting. This was a major difference from the two state-sponsored acting schools of German-speaking Switzerland, now the Zurich University of the Arts and Bern Academy of the Arts, which focused on stage performance. Sarkis believed that the style of acting required for television was different from that of theater. He focused more on small movements and facial expressions, which could be seen in close-up shots but not on stage. Though the Theater Academy of Zurich (German: Schauspiel-Akademie Zürich) created a program for film acting around 1999, its director, Peter Danzeisen, pointed out that it had "different goals", being "committed to the literature [and] film d'auteur" and aiming to give its students "diverse" training.

EFAS offered a three-year program, the first two focused on acting technique and the third specific to film and television. In 1996, EFAS had 40 students; at the time it was located in the building where it was founded, at Erlenstrasse 89 in Richterswil, which was the first factory in the town and a former Catholic girls' home. Tuition was CHF 13,560, which was reduced to CHF 11,560 in special cases. This was expensive by Swiss standards. Around 80% of students worked alongside their studies, something accommodated by the class schedule of 22–25 hours a week, while some students took scholarships or loans from the cantons.

Many students aimed to work in the German film or television industry due to the larger market. Since EFAS targeted the German television market, which was "booming" in 1999, great emphasis was placed on students speaking "perfect High German". Applicants were accepted between ages 18 and 26 after an entrance exam. The admissions process was reportedly competitive, with EFAS consistently having more applicants than free spaces.

Swiss casting director Corinna Glaus said in 1999 that EFAS began with expansive goals and probably overestimated themselves, but she also said, "I get the feeling they have really learned and improved and are successively getting better".
