= Christian Schwochow =

German film director (born 1978)

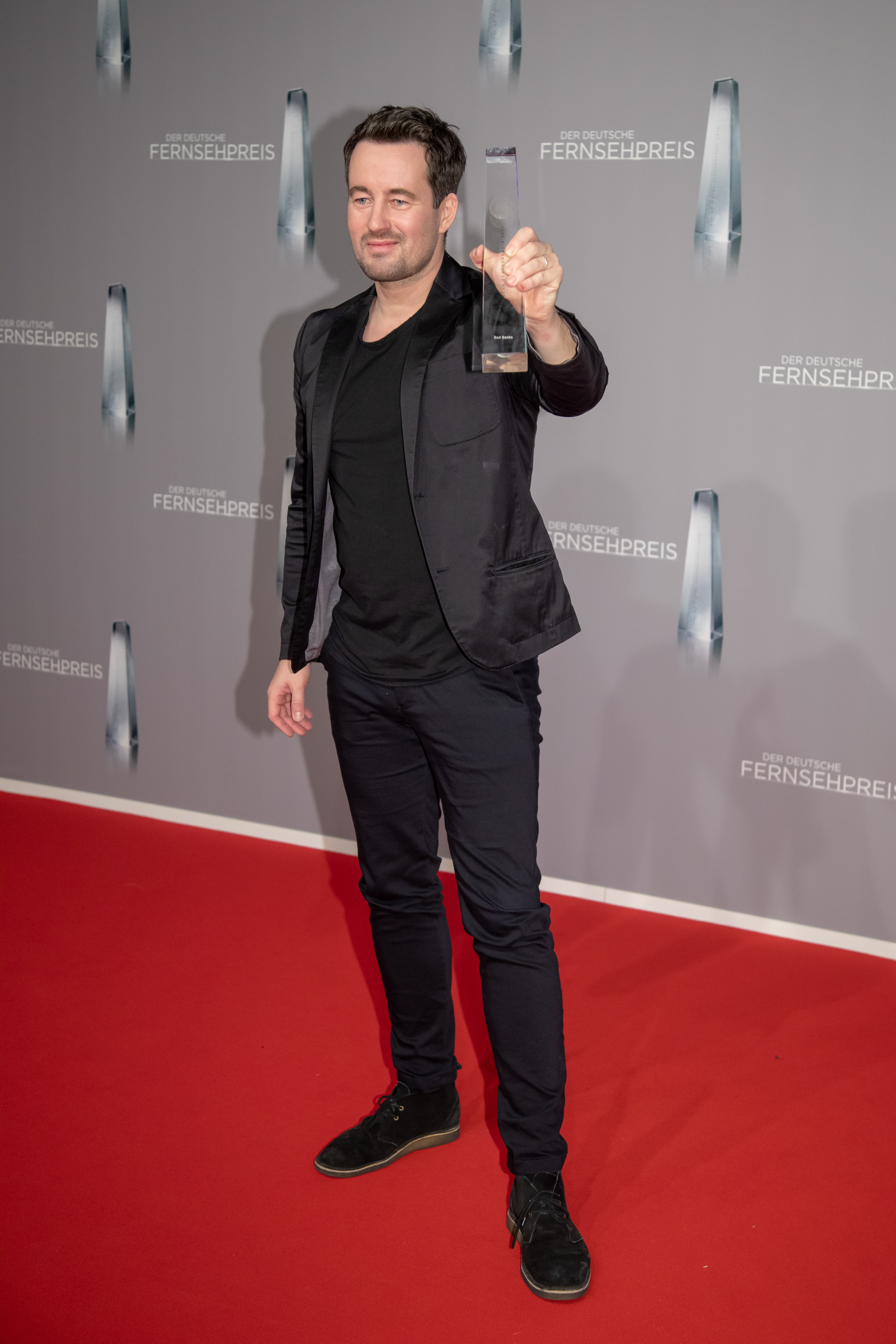
- Christian Schwochow at the German Television Prize 2019 in the Düsseldorf Rheinterrasse
- Born: 23 September 1978 (age 47); Bergen auf Rügen, East Germany
- Occupation: Film director
- Years active: 2005–present

Christian Schwochow (German: [ˈkʁɪsti̯a(ː)n ˈʃvɔxoː]; born 23 September 1978) is a German film and television director. He has directed more than ten films since 2005, including TV movie Open the Wall on the ARD channel, a tragicomedy about the fall of the Berlin Wall. Schwochow also directed episodes of season 3, season 5 and season 6 of the Netflix series The Crown.

== Life ==
Christian Schwochow was born on the Island of Rügen, off the northern coast of West Pomerania in the German Democratic Republic (East Germany: 1949–1990). Heide Schwochow, his mother, is a journalist and award-winning screenwriter. He grew up in Leipzig, East Berlin and (after 1990) Hanover. Through his mother's connections, he gained experience of work on the radio drama productions of the East German Radio Service while he was still a child.

== Selected filmography ==
Year	Title	Notes
2008	November Child	
2011	Cracks in the Shell	
2012	The Tower	TV film
2013	West	
2016	NSU German History X: The Perpetrators	
2016	Paula	
2018	Bad Banks	TV series
2021	Je suis Karl	
2021	Munich – The Edge of War	
