= Anthony Doerr =

American author

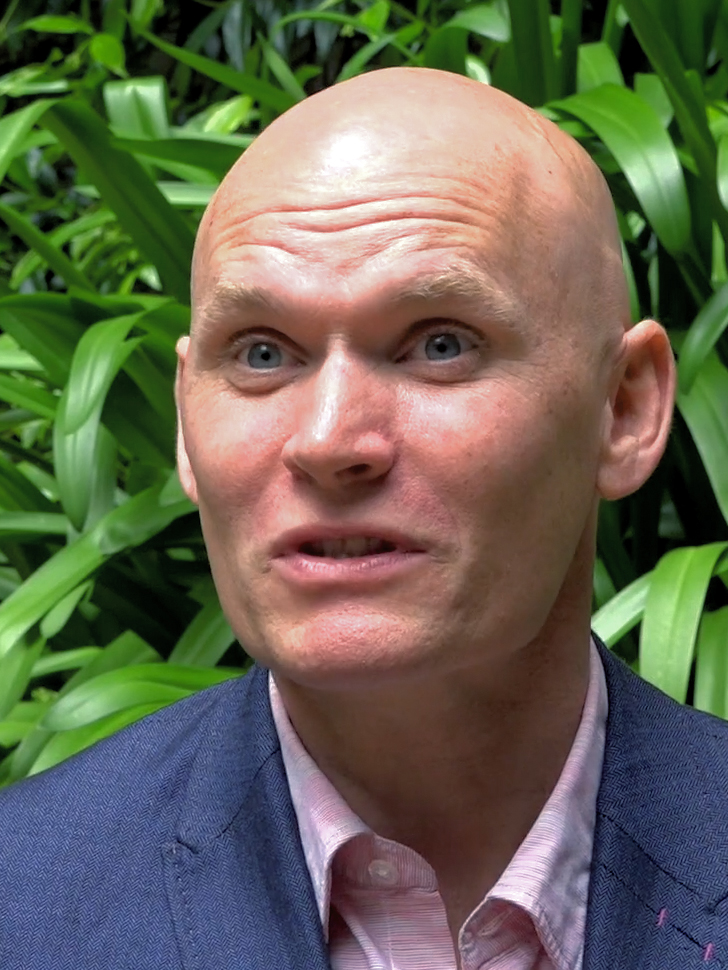
- Doerr in July 2015
- Born: 1973 (age 52–53); Cleveland, Ohio, U.S.
- Education: Bowdoin College (AB); Bowling Green State University (MFA)
- Occupation: Novelist
- Website: www.anthonydoerr.com

Anthony Doerr is an American author of novels and short stories. He gained widespread recognition for his 2014 novel All the Light We Cannot See, which won the Pulitzer Prize for Fiction.

== Early life and education ==
Doerr grew up in Cleveland, Ohio. He attended University School in Hunting Valley, an eastern Cleveland suburb, graduating in 1991. He majored in history at Bowdoin College in Brunswick, Maine, graduating in 1995. He earned an MFA from Bowling Green State University in Bowling Green.

== Career ==
Doerr's first book was a collection of short stories called The Shell Collector (2002). His first novel, About Grace, was released in 2004. His memoir, Four Seasons in Rome, was published in 2007, and his second collection of short stories, Memory Wall, was published in 2010. Doerr's second novel, All the Light We Cannot See, is set in occupied France during World War II and was published in 2014. He laboriously worked on writing it for a decade in his downtown Boise office.

It received significant critical acclaim and was a finalist for the National Book Award for Fiction. The book was a New York Times bestseller, and was named by the newspaper as a notable book of 2014. It won the Pulitzer Prize for Fiction in 2015. It was the runner-up for the 2015 Dayton Literary Peace Prize for Fiction and won the 2015 Ohioana Library Association Book Award for Fiction. “It’s hard to think that I really belong on that list (he's the first Idahoan to win but a handful of writers including Ernest Hemingway and Toni Morrison have ties to Idaho),” he told the Idaho Statesman. “I really haven’t had a chance to understand what this means. It’s so overwhelming. My editor worked with a bunch of great writers and told me that when Frank McCourt (‘Angela’s Ashes’ in 1997) won he told her, ‘Now you know the first line of my obituary.’ ... that’s true. It’s this thing that will be forever attached to my name. You know, ‘Pulitzer Prize-winner Tony Doerr does something stupid at a BSU football game.’ ...Can’t do that anymore.”

Doerr writes a column on science books for The Boston Globe and is a contributor to The Morning News, an online magazine. From 2007 to 2010, he was the Writer in Residence for the state of Idaho. Doerr's third novel, Cloud Cuckoo Land, has three story lines, scattered throughout time: 13-year-old Anna and Omeir, an orphaned seamstress and a cursed boy, on opposite sides of formidable city walls during the 1453 siege of Constantinople; teenage idealist Seymour and octogenarian Zeno in an attack on a public library in present-day Idaho; and Konstance, decades from now, who turns to the oldest stories to guide her community in peril. Cloud Cuckoo Land was released September 28, 2021. It was shortlisted for the 2021 National Book Award for Fiction.

== Personal life ==
Doerr lives in the highlands of Boise, Idaho, with his wife Shauna Eastman and their two twin sons. He has coached flag football and he and his sons ski and hike.

== Awards ==
- 2002: Barnes & Noble Discover Prize, for The Shell Collector
- 2002: O. Henry Prize for "The Hunter's Wife"
- 2003: Young Lions Fiction Award for The Shell Collector
- 2003: O. Henry Prize for "The Shell Collector"
- 2005: Rome Prize in Literature from the American Academy in Rome
- 2005, 2011: Ohioana Book Award for About Grace and Memory Wall, respectively
- 2008: O. Henry Prize for "Village 113" (Short story)
- 2010: Guggenheim Fellowship
- 2011: The Story Prize for Memory Wall
- 2011: Sunday Times Short Story Award for "The Deep"
- 2012: O. Henry Prize for "The Deep"
- 2014: National Book Award for Fiction finalist for All the Light We Cannot See
- 2015: Pulitzer Prize for Fiction for All the Light We Cannot See
- 2021: O. Henry Prize for "The Master’s Castle"

== Published works ==
=== Novels ===
- About Grace (2004) ISBN 9780743261821
- All the Light We Cannot See (2014) ISBN 9781476746586
- Cloud Cuckoo Land (2021) ISBN 9781982168438

=== Short fiction ===
Collections

- The Shell Collector (2002) ISBN 9781439190050
- Memory Wall (2010) ISBN 9781439182802

Anthologies edited

- The Best American Short Stories 2019 (Editor) ISBN 9781328465825

=== Memoirs ===
- Four Seasons in Rome: On Twins, Insomnia, and the Biggest Funeral in the History of the World (2007) ISBN 9781416540014

=== Essays and reporting ===
- Doerr, Anthony (2010). "Two nights". Fugue. 38 (Winter–Spring 2010): 45–54.
- — (2013). "Two nights". In Henderson, Bill (ed.). The Pushcart Prize XXXVII : best of the small presses 2013. Pushcart Press. pp. 208–216.
