= All the Light We Cannot See =

2014 novel by Anthony Doerr

- First edition cover
- Author: Anthony Doerr
- Language: English
- Genre: Historical fiction
- Published: May 6, 2014
- Publisher: Scribner
- Publication place: United States
- Media type: Print (hardback and softback)
- Pages: 544 (hardback); 531 (softback)
- Awards: Pulitzer Prize for Fiction, Andrew Carnegie Medal for Excellence in Fiction
- ISBN: 978-1-4767-4658-6
- OCLC: 852226410
- LC Class: PS3604.O34 A77 2014

All the Light We Cannot See is a 2014 war novel by American author Anthony Doerr. The novel is set during World War II. It revolves around the characters Marie-Laure LeBlanc, a blind French girl who takes refuge in her great-uncle's house in Saint-Malo after Paris is invaded by Nazi Germany, and Werner Pfennig, a bright German boy who is accepted into a military school because of his skills in radio technology. The book alternates between paralleling chapters depicting Marie-Laure and Werner, framed with a nonlinear structure. The novel has a lyrical writing style, with critics noting extensive sensory details. The story has ethical themes, portraying the destructive nature of war and Doerr's fascination with science and nature.

Doerr drew inspiration from a 2004 train ride. During the ride, a passenger became frustrated after his telephone call disconnected. Doerr felt the passenger did not appreciate the "miracle" of long-distance communication and wanted to write a novel about appreciating said miracles. He decided to set the novel in World War II with a focus on the Battle of Saint-Malo after visiting the town in 2005. Doerr spent ten years writing All the Light We Cannot See, with much time dedicated to research on World War II.

Scribner published All the Light We Cannot See on May 6, 2014, to commercial and critical success. It was on The New York Times Best Seller list for over 200 weeks and sold over 15 million copies. Several publications considered it to be among the best books of 2014. The novel won the Pulitzer Prize for Fiction and the Andrew Carnegie Medal for Excellence in Fiction, and was shortlisted for the National Book Award. A television adaptation produced by 21 Laps Entertainment was announced in 2019 and was released on Netflix as a four-part miniseries on November 2, 2023.

== Plot ==
All the Light We Cannot See is structured nonlinearly; sections taking place during the Battle of Saint-Malo in August 1944 are interspersed with sections about earlier times starting in 1934 and going in chronological order. Additionally, the point of view alternates between Marie-Laure LeBlanc and Werner Pfennig between chapters. For simplicity, their respective narratives preceding the Battle of Saint-Malo along with the events during and after the battle have dedicated sub-sections.

=== Marie-Laure LeBlanc ===
Marie-Laure LeBlanc is a girl who lives in Paris with her father Daniel, the master locksmith at the Museum of Natural History. She went blind at the age of six in 1934. Since then, Daniel has helped her adapt to her blindness by creating a model of Paris for her to feel and training her to navigate it. Marie-Laure hears stories about a diamond known as the Sea of Flames that is hidden within the museum; the diamond is said to grant immortality at the cost of endless misfortune to those around the owner. The only way to end the curse is to return the stone to the ocean, its rightful owner.

When Nazi Germany invades France in 1940, Marie-Laure and Daniel flee to the coastal town of Saint-Malo to take refuge with her great-uncle Etienne, a reclusive, shell-shocked veteran of World War I who spends his time broadcasting educational audio recordings, produced by his deceased brother, across Europe. Unknown to Marie-Laure, the museum has entrusted her father with either the Sea of Flames or one of three exact copies that were made to protect the original gem. Months later, while building a model of Saint-Malo for Marie-Laure, Daniel is arrested and suspected of conspiracy. Other than a few letters he manages to get out of prison, he is not heard from again, leaving Marie-Laure alone with Etienne and his longtime maid and housekeeper, Madame Manec.

Madame Manec participates in the French Resistance along with other local women. Their activities have some success, but Madame Manec becomes ill and dies. Marie-Laure and Etienne continue Madame Manec's efforts over the next few years, transmitting top-secret messages by radio transmitter. Eventually, while Marie-Laure is going home to deliver a routine Resistance message from the bakery, she is visited by Sergeant Major Reinhold von Rumpel, a Nazi gemologist who is searching for the Sea of Flames and has tracked the real one to Saint-Malo. Von Rumpel, who is dying of cancer, believes the diamond (according to the myth) will save him. Von Rumpel asks the frightened Marie-Laure if her father left her anything and leaves when she says "just a dumb model". Etienne takes over Marie-Laure's role of message-deliverer, and she later opens the model of Etienne's house on the Saint-Malo model and finds the Sea of Flames. Etienne is eventually arrested and sent to Fort National on false charges of terrorism.

=== Werner Pfennig ===
In Nazi Germany, Werner Pfennig is an orphan in the coal-mining town of Zollverein. He is exceptionally bright and has a natural skill for building and repairing radios. He discovers this skill in 1934 at the age of eight after he finds a broken radio with his sister Jutta, fixes it, and uses it to hear science and music programs transmitted across Europe. In 1940, Werner's skill earns him a place at the National Political Institute of Education at Schulpforta, a draconian state boarding school teaching Nazi values, which Jutta hates. She has been listening to French radio broadcasts about Germany's war crimes during its invasion and is angered by Werner's accepting a place at Schulpforta. Before leaving for Schulpforta, Werner promises Jutta he will return to Zollverein in two years to fly away with her on an airplane.

In Schulpforta, Werner begins working on radio technology alongside Frank Volkheimer—a strong student perceived by the other students as the ideal Nazi—under the supervision of Schulpforta professor Dr. Hauptmann. Volkheimer eventually leaves to join the military. Werner befriends Frederick, a kind-hearted and inattentive student who is deemed weak by the school. After enduring bullying, Frederick suffers a severe beating at the hands of his fellow students, leaving him with permanent brain damage and forcing his return to his home in Berlin. Two years after entering, when Werner asks to leave Schulpforta, Dr. Hauptmann lies about Werner's age and persuades Nazi officials to send him to the military.

Werner is placed in a Wehrmacht squad led by Volkheimer that consists of engineer Walter Bernd and two other soldiers, both named Neumann. The squad travels throughout Europe, tracking illegal enemy signals and executing whoever is producing them. During this time, Werner also contracts an illness, a fever, from which he never fully recovers. Werner becomes increasingly disillusioned with his position, especially after his group kills an innocent young girl after he incorrectly traces a signal. When the squad reaches Saint-Malo, Werner traces Etienne's signal. Recognizing the voice and music to be from the science programs he listened to at the orphanage, he does not disclose the signal. Werner tracks it to Etienne's house and becomes entranced by Marie-Laure when he sees her heading to the bakery. Werner decides to conceal the signal's existence from the rest of the squad.

=== Battle of Saint-Malo and aftermath ===
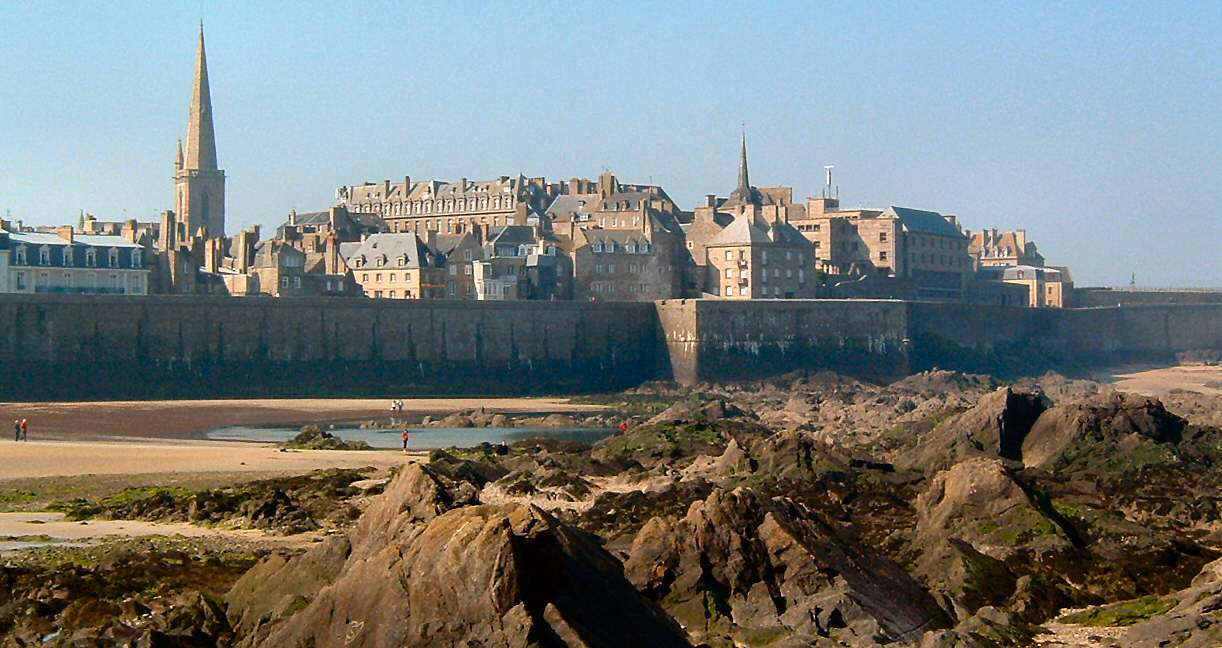
Much of All the Light We Cannot See takes place in Saint-Malo (pictured in 2015).

When the United States forces lay siege to Saint-Malo in August 1944, Marie-Laure grabs the Sea of Flames and hides in the cellar. After waking the next day, Marie-Laure leaves the cellar to get some water. When von Rumpel enters the house, looking for the Sea of Flames, Marie-Laure hides in the attic for several days. Using Etienne's transmitter, she tries to call for help by transmitting herself reading a braille version of the science fiction novel Twenty Thousand Leagues Under the Seas alongside pleas for rescue. During this, an ill and increasingly desperate von Rumpel unsuccessfully searches the house for several days after discovering the Sea of Flames is no longer inside the Saint-Malo model.

Meanwhile, Werner, Volkheimer, and Bernd become trapped beneath a pile of rubble in a cellar after the U.S. forces bomb the hotel in which they have been staying. Bernd is wounded in the explosion and dies. Werner mends a radio in an attempt to find help and discovers Marie-Laure's broadcasts. Several days later, Volkheimer realizes they could die soon and has Werner blow up the rubble with a grenade. After they escape, Werner goes to Etienne's house to rescue Marie-Laure. He finds von Rumpel, who has become delirious after failing to find the Sea of Flames. After a brief standoff, Werner shoots and kills von Rumpel and meets Marie-Laure. As they flee from Saint-Malo, Marie-Laure places the Sea of Flames inside a gated grotto flooded with seawater to return the gem to the sea. She gives the key to the gate to Werner, who sends her away to safety. Werner is captured and sent to a US prisoner-of-war camp, where he, after never fully recovering from his initial fever, becomes gravely ill. One night, in a fit of delirium, Werner leaves the hospital tent and accidentally steps on a German landmine, which kills him instantly. Etienne is freed from Fort National and reunites with Marie-Laure. They never discover what became of Daniel, her father.

Thirty years later, Volkheimer receives Werner's belongings at the time of his death, including the model house that contained the Sea of Flames. Volkheimer finds Jutta, who is now a married math teacher, and gives her the items. He tells her that Werner was last seen in France and may have been in love. Jutta travels to France with her son Max to investigate the model and meets Marie-Laure in Paris; she is now working as a marine biologist at the Museum of Natural History. Marie-Laure opens the model and finds the key to the grotto. She wonders where the gem ended up; whether it stayed in the ocean or whether Werner took it with him. The story ends in 2014 with Marie-Laure, now eighty-six years old, walking with her grandson Michel in the streets of Paris.

== Background and writing ==
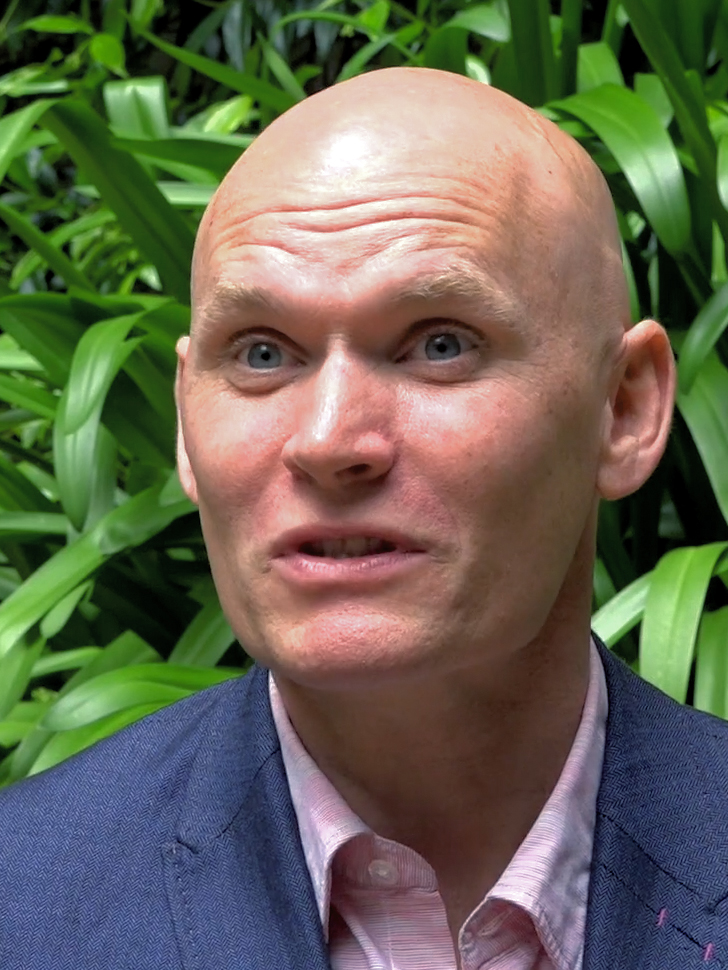
Anthony Doerr (pictured in 2015) is the author of All the Light We Cannot See.

Anthony Doerr is an author from Boise, Idaho. He previously wrote the short story collection The Shell Collector (2002) and the novel About Grace (2004). The memoir Four Seasons in Rome (2007) and the short story collection Memory Wall (2010) were released while All the Light We Cannot See was being written. Doerr has garnered several awards throughout his writing career, including four O. Henry Awards. Doerr has a fascination with science. This interest originated from his youth in Cleveland, Ohio, particularly his mother's teachings and their travels into the country. This fascination has influenced Doerr's works, including All the Light We Cannot See.

Doerr drew inspiration for All the Light We Cannot See during a 2004 train ride to meet with his publisher. When the train passed through a tunnel, a passenger became frustrated when his telephone call disconnected. Doerr thought the passenger did not appreciate the "miracle" of long-distance communication. He conceptualized a story set in a time when this would be considered a miracle. After the event, he wrote "All the Light We Cannot See" in a notebook. At the time, his only idea for the book was a scene of a girl reading to a boy over the radio.

During a 2005 trip to France, Doerr visited Saint-Malo to promote After Grace. U.S. forces nearly destroyed Saint-Malo during World War II, leading to it requiring a lengthy reconstruction after the war. Doerr became interested in how, in his words, "a place could so thoroughly hide its own incineration": that the city felt ancient to him, in spite of its destruction near the end of World War II. The visit led to him setting the novel in World War II. He formulated his scene to have the boy trapped somewhere in Saint-Malo and listening to the girl reading Jules Verne's Twenty Thousand Leagues Under the Seas over the radio.

Doerr wanted to tell an original story set in World War II. According to him, many of the war stories he had read portrayed the French resistance as charismatic heroes and the Nazis as evil torturers. Doerr wanted to highlight the civilians involved in the war from both sides, forced into making morally ambiguous decisions. To accomplish this, Doerr wrote the German narrative to feature a person tragically involved in Nazism and wrote the French narrative to feature a talented disabled person. To balance the sympathetic portrayal of a Nazi, however, Doerr wrote Reinhold von Rumpel as the evil Nazi archetype, which he believed readers would be more familiar with. In addition to highlighting the civilians, Doerr also wanted to convey the abundance of miracles that can appear, even during war.

The novel took ten years to write, most of which he spent on research. Doerr read diaries and letters written during World War II and visited Germany, Paris, and Saint-Malo for further study. His inability to speak French or German hindered his research, forcing him to use Google Translate. Despite this, his research allowed Doerr to add historical details to his narrative, including speech transcripts and the names of German radio manufacturers. Doerr considered writing All the Light We Cannot See to be "fun and super frustrating all at once." Doerr intentionally wrote short chapters to keep the novel accessible because of the lyrical style. He wrote over a hundred short chapters that alternated between perspectives, a process he likened to building a model house. The beginning, middle, and ending were written simultaneously.

== Analysis ==
=== Style and structure ===
Critics consider the writing style of All the Light We Cannot See to be lyrical. The novel is told in the present tense, with short chapters and sentences. According to The Guardian's Michelle Dean, this "gives the impression of simplicity". Throughout the novel, Doerr "allows simple details to say much", following the maxim of "show, don't tell". Critics considered points of interest, such as battlefields and beaches, detailed. In particular, the story from Marie-Laure's point of view uses sharp, sensory details of sound, touch, and smell.

Marie-Laure's and Werner's stories are told in alternating chapters. Each chapter is a few pages long, and offers a glimpse of each character and their circumstances. The stories of the two characters parallel each other; Marie-Laure's story is about her experiences without sight while Werner's story is about his fascination with sound. Much of the story takes place between 1934 and 1945, with a focus on the Battle of Saint-Malo in August 1944, where Marie-Laure's and Werner's stories converge. Throughout the novel, the narrative depicts events in the Battle of Saint-Malo, with interspersed chapters that depict the preceding events. The ending of the novel takes place in the 21st century.

=== Morality and characters ===
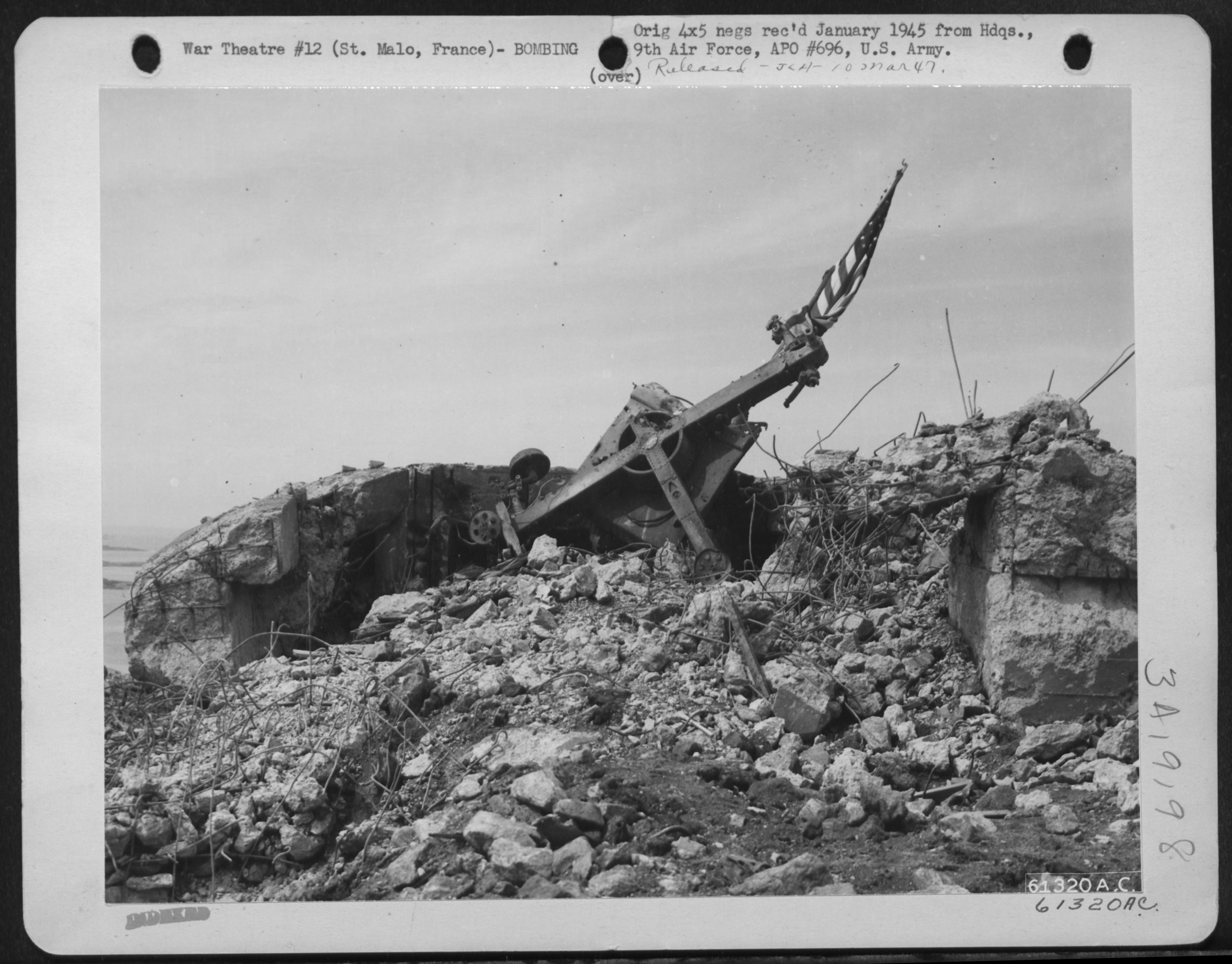
A building that was destroyed by bombs during the Battle of Saint-Malo (pictured in 1944). All the Light We Cannot See portrays the destructive nature of war.

All the Light We Cannot See deals with ethical themes, exploring questions about life without directly posing them. Germany's attempt to acquire all of Europe leads to its downfall, as von Rumpel tries to retrieve the cursed Sea of Flames, highlighting the dangers of greed. Another theme is the nature of sacrifice; Daniel gives the Sea of Flames to Marie-Laure to keep her alive despite the curse leading to his arrest, and Werner is forced to risk his life for Germany. The novel also deals with dichotomies such as choice versus fate and atrocity versus honor. Doerr places emphasis on character decisions, including those related to self-protection and falsehoods.

The characters in All the Light We Cannot See are often morally ambiguous rather than simplistic. According to The Lancet, Doerr's selected details prevent the reader from viewing Werner as merely an evil Nazi and Marie-Laure as merely a noble hero. The characters, even those established as heroes, are flawed in some way. Marie-Laure believes she is not as courageous as others see her and that her experience of blindness is routine for her. The story portrays Werner tragically; he struggles to find free will and redemption. He is forced to enter a military school to escape an unpalatable fate in the mines, and the school eventually sends him to the army against his will. Despite his sympathetic portrayal, the narrative does not excuse his actions in the military and increasing tolerance of violence, though he ultimately finds redemption when he rescues Marie-Laure.

All the Light We Cannot See also has anti-war themes. Particularly, through the symbolism of the Sea of Flames and its legend, All the Light We Cannot See illustrates how pursuing human desires can lead to war and misery. As stated by Dominic Green, the novel equates all violence in war as equal, even between the Nazi and the Allied forces. All the Light We Cannot See also re-creates the deprived conditions of France during World War II and the strict lives of the occupying German soldiers. It uses its characters to represent the typical people and their experiences during World War II. Allan E. Crandall of Psychiatric Services notes subtext within the novel that indicates an "uneasy collective unconscious of both combatants and civilians." Ultimately, it portrays the destructive nature of war and its stripping of free will, along with optimism and redemption during such circumstances through the characters of Werner and Marie-Laure.

=== Fascination with science and nature ===
Doerr's works play on his fascination with science and the natural world, of which All the Light We Cannot See is an example. Doerr wanted to write a novel in which long-distance communication would have been a miracle. Christine Pivovar of the Kansas City Star stated, "Science and the natural world [in All the Light We Cannot See] take on the role of the supernatural in a traditional fairy tale."

All the Light We Cannot See portrays creatures, gemology, and technological advances such as radio waves as fascinating marvels. Marie-Laure is fascinated by marine creatures, while Werner has a passion and gift for science and radio technology. The title refers to the infinite electromagnetic spectrum that includes light. According to Cha, the invisibility of most of the electromagnetic spectrum is a common motif throughout the book, and imparts "texture and rhythm as well as a thematic tension, between the insignificant and miraculous natures of mankind and all the immeasurable components that make up our lives". When the story reaches the early 21st century, a character contemplates the abundance of electromagnetic waves flowing from cell phones and computers, wondering if souls could be traveling between them.

== Publication and sales ==
All the Light We Cannot See was published on May 6, 2014, by Scribner, with a print run of 60,000 copies to commercial success. By December 2014, the book had been reprinted 25 times, with 920,000 copies produced in total. It was on The New York Times Best Seller list for over 200 weeks, entering the list a few weeks after its publication. It sold well throughout the year; sales tripled after the novel lost the National Book Award to Redeployment (2014). In the run-up to Christmas that year, it was out of stock on Amazon and other booksellers. On Nielsen BookScan's rankings of adult fiction novels, All the Light We Cannot See was listed as the 20th-best-selling novel of 2014, selling 247,789 units; the fourth-best-selling novel of 2015 with sales of 1,013,616 units; and the tenth-best-selling novel of 2016 with sales of 366,431 units. The Millions reported sales of All the Light We Cannot See reached two million copies in March 2016. In January 2021, Publishers Weekly reported All the Light We Cannot See had sold 5.5 million copies in North America and 9.3 million copies worldwide. By September 2021, the novel had sold over 15 million copies. Anthony Doerr found the novel's popularity unexpected due to it featuring a sympathetic Nazi and containing intricate passages about technology.

== Critical reception ==
All the Light We Cannot See has received critical acclaim. It won the 2015 Pulitzer Prize for Fiction and the 2015 Andrew Carnegie Medal for Excellence in Fiction, was shortlisted for the National Book Award, and was the runner-up for the 2015 Dayton Literary Peace Prize for fiction. It was considered among the best books released in 2014 by Entertainment Weekly, Kirkus Reviews, The New York Times, The Washington Post, and NPR. Several critics considered All the Light We Cannot See to be Doerr's best book. In a starred review for Booklist, Brad Hopper called it "a novel to live in, learn from, and feel bereft over when the last page is turned". Cha lauded the novel as a "beautiful, expansive tale". JoJo Marshall of Entertainment Weekly wrote that All the Light We Cannot See is a "not-to-be-missed tale [that] is a testament to the buoyancy of our dreams".

Critics praised All the Light We Cannot See's lyrical writing, with many praising the style's aesthetic. Critics admired the detailed descriptions within the novel, especially the sensory details, which John Freeman said made Doerr's language "startling fresh". Pivovar and the San Francisco Chronicle's Dan Cryer found these descriptions to be immersive, with Cryer saying, "Doerr's novel spotlights history in vivid primary colors. He makes us not only see but also feel the desolation and barbarism of war." Some critics commended All the Light We Cannot See for having a brisk pace. Amanda Vaill felt the nonlinear structure created suspense, while Alan Cheuse found it annoying. There were also critics who felt the novel was overwritten.

The characterization was also praised; Pittsburgh Post-Gazette's Steven Novak found it to be where the merits of the novel were rooted. Multiple critics considered the characterization compelling, finding themselves invested in the characters. Sharon Peters of USA Today wrote: "Few authors can so gently—yet resolutely—pull readers into such deep understanding of and connection with their characters". Particularly, several expressed admiration toward the stories of Marie-Laure and Werner paralleling one another. Regarding the encounter of these two characters, many readers expressed disappointment at how short their encounter was. This has been acknowledged by the book author who remarked that he found himself "for years trying to justify that [ending] through historical accuracy, to say it wasn't very likely that Werner would have more than a few minutes." The focus on characters and their choices in a wartime setting was found to be fresh by both Kirkus Reviews and Janet Maslin. William T. Vollman and Steph Cha had differing opinions over which of the two main characters was better characterized; Vollman cited Marie-Laure's "believable" representation of blindness and Cha cited Werner's internal struggle with Nazism. Vollman in particular criticized the use of Nazi stereotypes. Both Green and Justin Cartwright expressed concern about All the Light We Cannot See portraying the Nazis and the Allies in war as falsely morally equivalent.

== Television adaptation ==
In March 2019, Netflix and 21 Laps Entertainment acquired the rights to develop a limited television adaptation of All the Light We Cannot See, with Shawn Levy, Dan Levine, and Josh Barry as executive producers. In September 2021, Netflix announced that the series would consist of four episodes, with Steven Knight as writer and Levy as director. The adaptation stars Aria Mia Loberti as Marie-Laure, Louis Hofmann as Werner, Mark Ruffalo as Daniel, Hugh Laurie as Etienne, Lars Eidinger as von Rumpel, and Nell Sutton as the young Marie-Laure. With approval from Doerr, Levy removed potentially upsetting scenes late in the story for the adaptation, stating that he wanted the ending to feel optimistic.

The adaptation premiered at the 2023 Toronto International Film Festival and was released on Netflix on November 2, 2023. The initial critic reviews have been generally negative. To date, out of 64 reviews, 28% have been positive, according to Rotten Tomatoes. The critics who read the novel deemed the changes superficial and unnecessary, arguing that the story is cliché and monotonous without the "central character's astute, compelling perspective" from the novel, as quoted from Ben Travers of IndieWire. The Hollywood Reporter's Daniel Fienberg specifically thought that by the third episode, the plot barely resembled the novel, with each change making the "material louder, clumsier and less emotionally rich."
