= Saskia Marka =

German film title and graphic designer

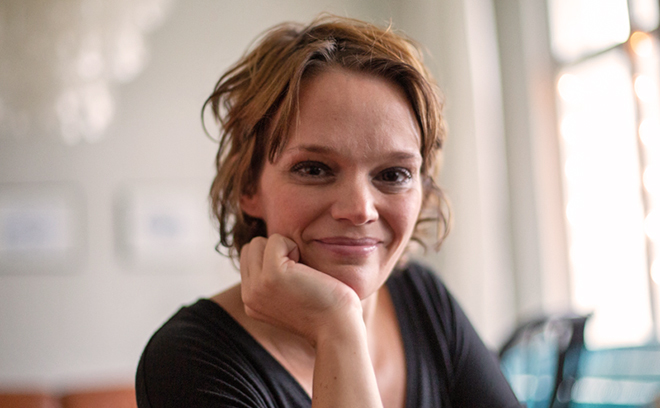
- Saskia Marka, 2019
- Occupations: Film title and graphic designer, artist
- Years active: 2001–present

Saskia Marka is a German artist and film title designer, known for her work on the TV series Babylon Berlin, The Queen's Gambit, Deutschland 83, Deutschland 86 and Deutschland 89.

== Life and work ==
Marka studied communication design at the Muthesius University of Fine Arts and Design (Muthesius Kunsthochschule) in Kiel. After receiving her diploma there, she went on to study Film & TV Design (today: Motion Design) at the Film Academy Baden-Württemberg in Ludwigsburg in 2000, which Marka also completed with a diploma in 2003.

Since then she has been working as a freelancer and has designed title sequences, opening and closing credits for many German and international films and television series. Marka also designed the artwork for several German feature films and series. In 2010, she became the first German title designer to receive the Certificate Of Typographic Excellence from the Type Directors Club of New York for her title design for the German feature film This Is Love.

Marka achieved international fame with her work for the television series Babylon Berlin (2017), The Queen's Gambit (2020), Deutschland 83 (2015), Deutschland 86 (2018) and Deutschland 89 (2020). Her opening credits for the TV series Deutschland 83 were among "The 10 Best Opening Credits of 2015" of the website Vulture.com. The title sequence for the TV series Babylon Berlin, created by Marka, "was named Art of the Title’s number one title sequence of 2018". In 2019 she was nominated for the SXSW Film Design Award (the jury prize for Excellence in Title Design) at the SXSW Film Festival for her title design of the series Babylon Berlin. In 2021, Marka won the SXSW Film Design Award and received a Bronze Cube at the 100th Annual ADC Awards for her end title sequence for the series The Queen's Gambit. This sequence made it also into the "Top Picks of 2020" by industry website Art of the Title. In the same year, she also received an Emmy nomination for her work on The Queen's Gambit.

== Filmography (selection) ==
- Unschuldig (TV series), (2008) – director: Philipp Kadelbach
- This Night (Diese Nacht) (feature film), (2008) – director: Werner Schroeter
- I Know You Know (feature film), (2008) – director: Justin Kerrigan
- Horst Schlämmer – Isch kandidiere! (feature film), (2009) – director: Angelo Colagrossi
- Gravity (Schwerkraft) (feature film), (2009) – director: Maximilian Erlenwein
- This Is Love (feature film), (2009) – director: Matthias Glasner
- Großstadtrevier (TV series), (2007–2009) – director: Various
- Outcast (feature film), (2010) – director: Colm McCarthy
- Life Is Too Long (Das Leben ist zu lang) (feature film), (2010) – director: Dani Levy
- The Good Neighbour (Unter Nachbarn) (feature film), (2011) – director: Stephan Rick
- Blaubeerblau (TV movie), (2011) – director: Rainer Kaufmann
- The Loneliest Planet (feature film), (2011) – director: Julia Loktev
- Mercy (Gnade) (feature film), (2012) – director: Matthias Glasner
- The Iran Job (documentary), (2012) – director: Till Schauder
- Invasion (feature film), (2012) – director: Dito Tsintsadze
- The Weekend (Das Wochenende) (feature film), (2012) – director: Nina Grosse
- Wolf Children (feature film), (2013) – director: Rick Ostermann
- Lose My Self (Vergiss mein Ich) (feature film), (2014) – director: Jan Schomburg
- Phoenix (feature film), (2014) – director: Christian Petzold
- Sanctuary (Freistatt) (feature film), (2015) – director: Marc Brummund
- Deutschland 83 (TV mini-series), (2015) – director: Edward Berger, Samira Radsi
- Stefan Zweig: Farewell to Europe (Vor der Morgenröte) (feature film), (2016) – director: Maria Schrader
- Deutschland 86 (TV mini-series), (2018) – director: Florian Cossen, Arne Feldhusen
- Tatort (TV series, title designer for 6 episodes), (2015–2018) – director: Sebastian Marka
- Die verlorene Tochter (TV mini-series), (2020) – director: Kai Wessel
- Deutschland 89 (TV mini-series), (2020) – director: Soleen Yusef, Randa Chahoud
- The Queen's Gambit (TV mini-series), (2020) – director: Scott Frank
- Leipzig Homicide (SOKO Leipzig) (TV series), (2017–2021) – director: Various
- Babylon Berlin (TV series), (2017–2022) – director: Henk Handloegten, Tom Tykwer, Achim von Borries
- Leopard Skin, (2022) – director: Sebastian Gutierrez
- Liaison, (2023) – director: Stephen Hopkins

== Awards ==
=== Type Directors Club ===
- 2010: Certificate Of Typographic Excellence for This Is Love

=== Beazley Designs of the Year ===
- 2020: Nomination for the Beazley Design of the Year Award in the category Graphics for Babylon Berlin

=== South by Southwest (SXSW) ===
- 2019: Nomination for the SXSW Film Design Award – Excellence in Title Design in the category Title Design Competition for Babylon Berlin
- 2021: SXSW Film Design Award – Excellence in Title Design in the category Title Design Competition for The Queen's Gambit

=== ADC Awards ===
- 2021: Bronze Cube Award in the category Motion / Film / Title Sequences for The Queen's Gambit

=== Primetime Emmy Awards ===
- 2021: Nomination for the Primetime Emmy Award for Outstanding Main Title Design at the 73rd Primetime Emmy Awards for The Queen's Gambit
