= Maria Schrader =

German actress, screenwriter and director

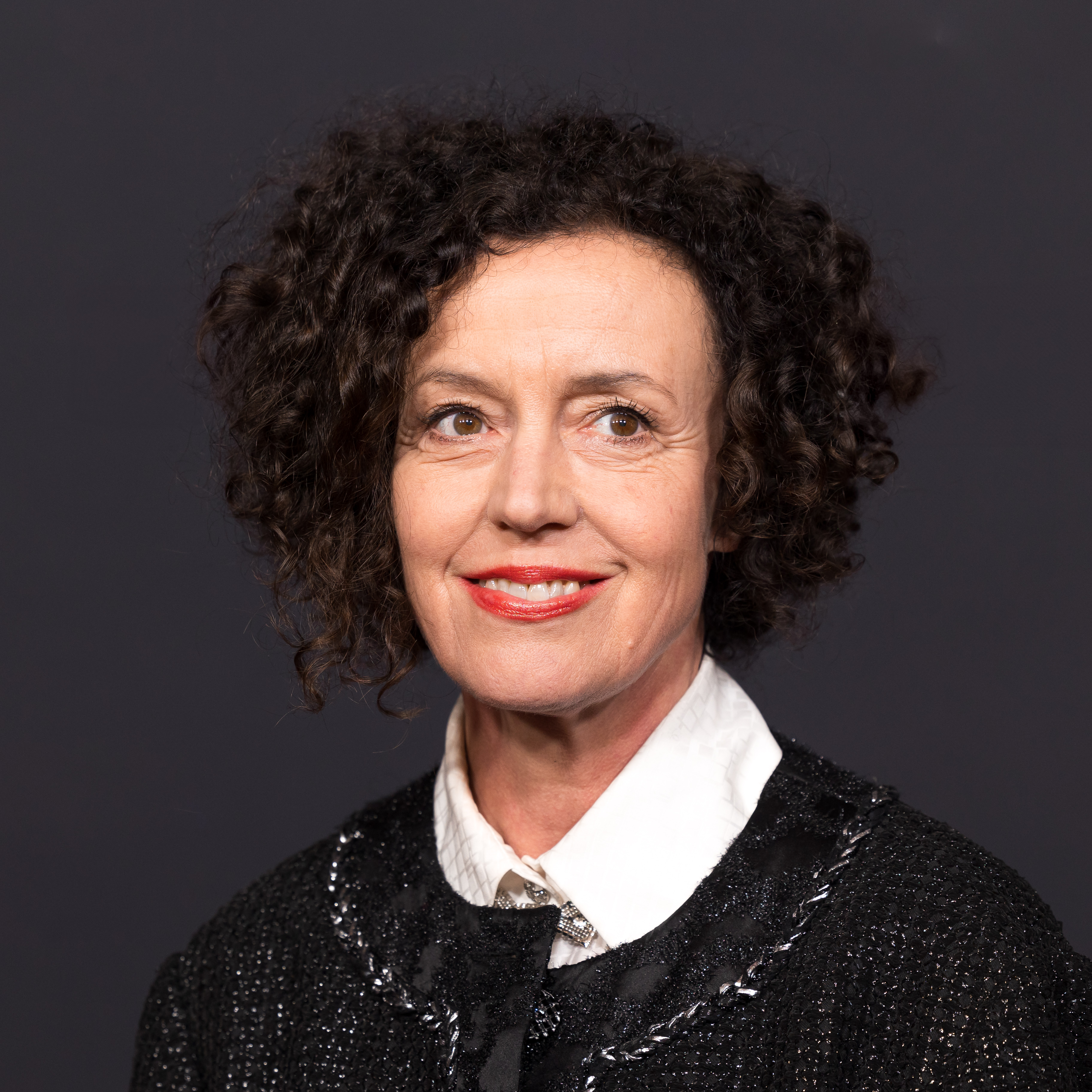
- Schrader at the 74th Berlin International Film Festival
- Born: 27 September 1965 (age 60); Hannover, Lower Saxony, West Germany
- Occupations: Director, screenwriter, actress
- Years active: 1992–present

Maria Schrader (born 27 September 1965) is a German actress, screenwriter, and director. She directed the award-winning 2007 film Love Life and the 2020 Netflix miniseries Unorthodox, for which she won the Primetime Emmy Award for Outstanding Directing for a Limited Series. She also starred in the German international hit TV series Deutschland 83 (2015), known for being the first German-language series broadcast on US television.

== Early life and career ==
Schrader was born in Hanover and studied at the Max Reinhardt Seminar in Vienna, Austria.

She is especially well known from the film Aimée & Jaguar, as well as the acclaimed Liebesleben ("Love life") that she wrote, produced, and in which she acted. She has also written other films: RobbyKallePaul; I Was on Mars; Stille Nacht and Meschugge. She co-directed I Was on Mars with Dani Levy, whom she dated until 1999.

Schrader was part of the jury at the Berlin International Film Festival in 2000 and is again in the 2025 jury.

Schrader played the part of Martin Rauch's aunt in Deutschland 83 (2015), an 8 episode TV series, which was the first German-language TV series to be broadcast on US television. It also became popular in the UK, airing in early 2016 on Channel 4.

In 2020 Schrader directed the Netflix miniseries Unorthodox, for which she won the Primetime Emmy Award for Outstanding Directing for a Limited Series. She directed the 2022 film She Said, starring Carey Mulligan and Zoe Kazan.

Though Schrader's most popular roles as an actor are of the Jewish faith, and many of her films as a screenwriter and director include Jewish characters and revolve around Jewish struggles, Schrader herself is not Jewish.

== Awards ==
- 1992 Max Ophüls Festival, Best Young Actress for I Was on Mars
- 1995 Mystfest, Best Actress for Burning Life
- 1995 Bavarian Film Awards, Best Actress for Nobody Loves Me, Burning Life
- 1995 German Film Awards, Best Leading Actress for Nobody Loves Me, Burning Life, Einer meiner altesten Freunde
- 1999 49th Berlin International Film Festival, Silver Bear for Best Actress (shared with Juliane Köhler) for Aimée & Jaguar
- 1999 German Film Awards, Best Leading Actress for Aimée & Jaguar, The Giraffe
- 1999 Bavarian Film Awards, Best Actress for Aimée & Jaguar
- 2020 Primetime Emmy Award, Outstanding Directing for a Limited Series, Movie, or Dramatic Special for Unorthodox

== Nominations ==
- 2016 German Film Awards, Best Director for Stefan Zweig: Farewell to Europe (Original title in German: Vor der Morgenröte)

== Selected filmography ==
Actress
Year	Title	Role	Director	Notes
1992	I Was on Mars	Silva	Dani Levy	with Dani Levy
1994	Nobody Loves Me	Fanny Fink	Doris Dörrie	with Pierre Sanoussi-Bliss, Elisabeth Trissenaar
1994	Burning Life	Anna	Peter Welz	with Anna Thalbach, Max Tidof
1995	One of My Oldest Friends	Marion	Rainer Kaufmann	with Richy Müller, Peter Lohmeyer
1995	Silent Night	Julia	Dani Levy	with Jürgen Vogel
1997	The Unfish	Sophie Moor	Robert Dornhelm	with Eva Herzig, Andreas Lust, Georges Kern, August Schmölzer, Karl Merkatz, Bibiana Zeller, Rudolf Wessely, Erwin Leder
1997	Child Murder	Katrin Menzel	Bernd Böhlich	TV film, with Jürgen Vogel, Christian Redl, Francis Fulton-Smith
1998	Meschugge	Lena Katz	Dani Levy	with Dani Levy
1998	Am I Beautiful?	Elke	Doris Dörrie	with Senta Berger, Gottfried John, Iris Berben, Uwe Ochsenknecht, Franka Potente, Dietmar Schönherr, Heike Makatsch, Otto Sander, Joachim Król
1999	Aimée & Jaguar	Felice Schragenheim (Jaguar)	Max Färberböck	with Juliane Köhler, Heike Makatsch, Johanna Wokalek
2001	Viktor Vogel - Commercial Man	Johanna von Schulenberg	Lars Kraume	with Götz George, Alexander Scheer, Chulpan Khamatova, Vadim Glowna
2001	Emil and the Detectives	Pastorin Hummel	Franziska Buch	with Jürgen Vogel
2001	Josephine	Al	Rajko Grlić	with Miroslav Vladyka, Giancarlo Esposito
2002	Operation Rubikon	Sophie Wolf	Thomas Berger	TV film, with Hilmar Thate
2002	I'm the Father	Melanie Krieger	Dani Levy	with Sebastian Blomberg, Christiane Paul
2003	Rosenstrasse	Hannah Weinstein	Margarethe von Trotta	with Katja Riemann
2005	Schneeland	Elisabeth	Hans W. Geißendörfer	with Julia Jentsch, Ulrich Mühe, Thomas Kretschmann, Joachim Król, Susanne Lothar
2008	Patchwork	Xenia Napolitano-Freitag	Franziska Buch	TV film, with Gabriela Maria Schmeide, Fritz Karl
2011	In Darkness	Paulina Chiger	Agnieszka Holland	with Robert Więckiewicz
2013	Sisters	Saskia Kerkhoff	Anne Wild	with Ursula Werner, Jesper Christensen
2014	Lose My Self	Lena Ferben	Jan Schomburg	with Johannes Krisch, Ronald Zehrfeld, Sandra Hüller
2015	Deutschland 83	Lenora Rauch	Edward Berger, Samira Radsi	TV series, with Jonas Nay, Ulrich Noethen, Sylvester Groth, Sonja Gerhardt, Ludwig Trepte, Alexander Beyer, Lisa Tomaschewsky
2018	The City and The City	Sen. Detective Quissima Dhatt	Tom Shankland	TV series, with David Morrissey, Mandeep Dhillon, Lara Pulver
2018	Deutschland 86	Lenora Rauch	Florian Cossen, Arne Feldhusen	TV series, with Jonas Nay, Ulrich Noethen, Sylvester Groth, Sonja Gerhardt, Ludwig Trepte, Alexander Beyer, Lisa Tomaschewsky

Director
Year	Title	Starring	Notes
1998	Meschugge	Dani Levy	Co-director Dani Levy
2007	Love Life	Netta Garti, Rade Šerbedžija, Tovah Feldshuh	
2016	Stefan Zweig: Farewell to Europe	Josef Hader, Barbara Sukowa	
2020	Unorthodox	Shira Haas, Amit Rahav, Jeff Wilbusch	TV miniseries
2021	I'm Your Man	Maren Eggert, Dan Stevens, Sandra Hüller, Hans Löw, Wolfgang Hübsch	
2022	She Said	Carey Mulligan, Zoe Kazan, Patricia Clarkson, Andre Braugher, Samantha Morton, Tom Pelphrey	
