= Deutschland 89 =

German television series

- Genre: Cold War espionage
- Created by: Anna Winger; Joerg Winger
- Starring: Jonas Nay; Maria Schrader; Florence Kasumba; Sylvester Groth; Svenja Jung; Lavinia Wilson; Alexander Beyer; Carina Wiese; Fritzi Haberlandt; Raul Casso
- Theme music composer: Peter Schilling, David Harland Lodge
- Opening theme: "Major Tom (Coming Home)"
- Countries of origin: Germany; United States
- Original languages: German; English
- No. of seasons: 1
- No. of episodes: 8

Production
- Producer: Tim Greve
- Editors: Matthias Albrecht; Yvonne Tetzlaff; Robert Stuprich
- Camera setup: Multi-camera
- Running time: 45–47 minutes
- Production company: UFA Fiction

Original release
- Network: Amazon Prime Video (Germany); Sundance TV (United States)
- Release: 25 September 2020

Related
- Deutschland 86

Deutschland 89 is a 2020 German spy thriller television series, starring Jonas Nay as Martin Rauch, an agent of East Germany following the Fall of the Berlin Wall in 1989. It is a sequel to the 2015 series Deutschland 83, and 2018 series Deutschland 86, and premiered on Amazon Prime Video on 25 September 2020.

Similarly to its two predecessors, the season received positive reception from critics, who mostly saw it as a fitting end to the series.

== Plot ==
As the Berlin Wall falls, Stasi agents attempt to protect themselves from the fallout.

The character Martin Rauch is told, "Do not imagine you can live a simple life. You now have three options: Either you are killed, you go to court, or you work in a secret service again."

Anna Winger and Jörg Winger, creators and executive producers said: "When the Berlin Wall came down, Germany reinvented itself for the fourth time in the 20th century. Deutschland 89 goes back to the so-called 'end of history'. Our heroes, spies in the national security apparatus of a country that has collapsed overnight, find themselves at a dramatic crossroads, personally and professionally."

== Cast ==
=== Main ===
- Jonas Nay as Martin Rauch, a former East German intelligence officer who now works for a state-owned technology company but is forced to return to work as a spy and acts as a double agent.
- Maria Schrader as Lenora Rauch, Martin's aunt and former handler within the Stasi's foreign arm, the Main Directorate for Reconnaissance (HVA) who supplies explosives to the Red Army Faction.
- Sylvester Groth as Walter Schweppenstette, Lenora's former boss and Martin's father who is sent by the HVA to infiltrate the West German banking system.
- Corinna Harfouch as Beate, an HVA agent posing as Walter's wife in Frankfurt.
- Svenja Jung as Nicole Zangen, teacher of Martin's son Max.
- Fritzi Haberlandt as Tina Fischer, an East German doctor who escaped to West Berlin.
- Lavinia Wilson as Brigitte Winkelmann, Martin's former love interest and a Federal Intelligence Service (BND) agent working with the CIA to recruit former HVA agents.
- Florence Kasumba as Rose Seithathi, an African National Congress (ANC) operative and Lenora's love interest in Deutschland 86.
- Niels Borman as Fritz Hartmann, HVA technical expert and budding entrepreneur.
- Uwe Preuss as Markus Fuchs, a top ranking official in the HVA and Walter's boss.
- Anke Engelke as Barbara Dietrich, a financial consultant in the StäV and Markus' love interest.
- Carina Wiese as Ingrid Rauch, Martin's mother.
- Alexander Beyer as Tobias Tischbier, Martin's former handler from the HVA
- Raul Casso as Hector Valdez, an officer of the Central Intelligence Agency working in East Berlin with Winkelmann.
- Ari Kurecki as Max, Martin's son.

=== Recurring ===
- Emil Hoștină as Grigore Antonescu, a Romanian national and a member of a terrorist organization who befriends Lenora.
- Rainer Sellien as Carl Baumgarten, a West German musician and a member of a far-left terrorist group whom Martin is tasked to spy on.
- Samia Muriel Chancrin as Sabine Baumgarten, Carl's wife and accomplice.
- Lena Lauzemis as Nina Rudow, an HVA agent.
- Nicolai Borger as Rolf, the hitman of the far-left terrorist group that Martin infiltrates.
- Mike Davies as John Tyler, a CIA chief working in East Berlin.

== Episodes ==
No.	Title	Directed by	Written by	German airdate	U.S. airdate	Viewers (millions)
1	"Kyrie Eleison"	Soleen Yusef & Randa Chahoud	Joerg Winger	25 September 2020	29 October 2020	N/A
Martin Rauch is forced back into service by threats to send his son, Max, to Moscow. Martin is ordered to courier a new draft travel law to Egon Krenz, the leader of East Germany, and photograph it for the HVA on the way. The draft is radical, recommending the opening of the Berlin Wall. Martin pretends to Krenz that it has been approved by Moscow. The law is announced on television. East German citizens mass at the border and are allowed out by the guards.
2	"November Nights"	Soleen Yusef & Randa Chahoud	Steve Bailie	25 September 2020	30 November 2020	N/A
The HVA begin shredding their files. Max is hidden by his teacher Miss Zangen. Walter Schweppenstette, Martin's father, is sent to the West to infiltrate the banking system. The aim is to prevent the East German State Bank being bought by Deutsche Bank, so that the HVA can buy it instead. Martin is abducted by Brigitte Winkelmann of West German intelligence and Hector Valdez of the CIA. He is sent to pose as a sound technician to infiltrate a music group led by Carl and Sabine Baumgarten, who they suspect are planning a terrorist attack. Lenora is broken out of a West German prison by Rose.
3	"Magic"	Soleen Yusef & Randa Chahoud	Roger Drew & Ed Dyson	25 September 2020	5 November 2020	N/A
Deutsche Bank are seeking to hire East German bankers; Schweppenstette recommends a candidate. Tobias Tischbier informs Markus Fuchs about the social movement "Treuhand", which aims for the public to own shares in all enterprises. Lenora is recruited into a terrorist organisation by Grigore Antonescu, a Romanian. She asks Fuchs for access to a weapons depot. Sabine drugs Martin with magic mushrooms, and he confesses his secret service connections. He is driven home to Nicole's apartment by Carl, where he confesses his love for Nicole. Carl and Sabine return in a tour bus, saying they are taking Martin, Nicole and Max to Frankfurt to play in a concert.
4	"Operation Condor"	Soleen Yusef & Randa Chahoud	Roger Drew & Ed Dyson	25 September 2020	6 November 2020	N/A
The tour bus drives to Frankfurt. Carl uses a police radio frequency to cause disruption. Lenora supplies a bomb to the Red Army Faction, who use it to kill the head of Deutsche Bank, Alfred Herrhausen. Lenora and Antonescu head to Romania. Carl and Sabine imprison Martin and Nicole, but they escape and kill Carl. Martin and Nicole head to Romania to hide out. Fritz Hartmann of the HVA reinvents himself as an entrepreneur and attempts to sell computers with video cameras.
5	"Timișoara Rebellion"	Soleen Yusef & Randa Chahoud	Michael Idov & Lily Idov	25 September 2020	12 November 2020	N/A
Fuchs and Dietrich arrive in Frankfurt, fearful for their position and bringing gold in suitcases. They take up residence in Sorrento, Italy. Lenora and Antonescu arrive in Romania as unrest builds. They go to a safe house in Timișoara. Martin and Nicole also arrive in Timișoara, where Martin kills Antonescu. Lenora calls Beate, who gives her the address of Fuchs in Sorrento.
6	"Quando ti Guardo"	Soleen Yusef & Randa Chahoud	Roger Drew & Ed Dyson	25 September 2020	13 November 2020	N/A
Martin calls Schweppenstette, who gives him the address of Fuchs. Martin and Nicole arrive in Sorrento. Tina argues with a former Hohenschönhausen Prison worker, Rudi, who attacks Tobias Tischbier as he enters.
7	"Phase Zwei"	Soleen Yusef & Randa Chahoud	Steve Bailie	25 September 2020	19 November 2020	N/A
Lenora plans to assassinate the Chancellor of West Germany, Helmut Kohl. Tina recognises Rudi as her interrogator from prison. She traps him in her bedroom and he hangs himself when the police arrive. Martin starts to believe that Nicole is an HVA agent. Valdez and Winkelmann recruit Rose to capture Lenora, in exchange for help to the ANC. Rose supplies a rifle with no firing pin to Lenora, but Lenora exposes the deception. Lenora prepares to shoot Kohl with an alternative rifle, but Rose shoots her in the arm from another rooftop. Martin confronts Lenora but cannot bring himself to kill her. Nicole visits Martin's apartment and finds Annett dead with a note from Sabine promising to eliminate his family. Nicole travels to Beate for help.
8	"The End of History"	Soleen Yusef & Randa Chahoud	Steve Bailie & Joerg Winger	25 September 2020	20 November 2020	N/A
Martin wakes up imprisoned in a CIA safehouse by Hector Valdez, who accuses him of assassinating Herrhausen, planning to assassinate Kohl, and the murder of Annett Schneider in his apartment. Russian agents arrive at Beate's house seeking Max, but Beate convinces them to leave. Ingrid exposes Tobias Tischbier as an HVA agent. Martin escapes from the safehouse only to be ambushed by Valdez. Martin is rescued by Schweppenstette and John Tyler Jr of the CIA, who shoots Valdez, but Tyler says he cannot have any witnesses. Martin's family attend his funeral. Fuchs and Dietrich are assassinated by Fritz and Nina. Martin is alive with Nicole. Brigitte provides them with new identities. The series ends with a montage of new walls being erected in the decades following the fall of the Berlin Wall.

== Production ==
The initial funding grant of €700,000 ($780,000 US dollars) to UFA Fiction to begin production was approved by the Medienboard Berlin-Brandenburg, and announced on 7 February 2019. In September 2019 RTL confirmed that shooting had begun and was expected to be completed in and around Berlin by the end of 2019.

The headquarters of the former Ministry for State Security (MfS) in Normannenstraße in Berlin was used for shots on location and housed sets for the series.

As with Deutschland 86, there was a production partnership with online service Amazon Video, who provided additional funding. The announcement of Amazon's support for Deutschland 89 came before the release of Deutschland 86.

== Broadcast ==
Since 25 September 2020, Amazon Prime Video has been streaming the eight new episodes in Germany and Austria. The show began airing in America on Sundance TV on 29 October 2020. The Australian streaming service Stan released the show on 25 September 2020. In the UK the show began airing on More4 from 5 March 2021.

== Reception ==
Upon airing, the show was met with mostly positive reviews from critics. The Guardian gave a positive review of 4 out of 5 stars, praising the direction of Anna and Joerg Winger. IndieWire gave the series a B grade, praising the ambition of the show but directing criticism towards the overall pacing.
