= Ludwig Trepte =

German television and film actor (born 1988)

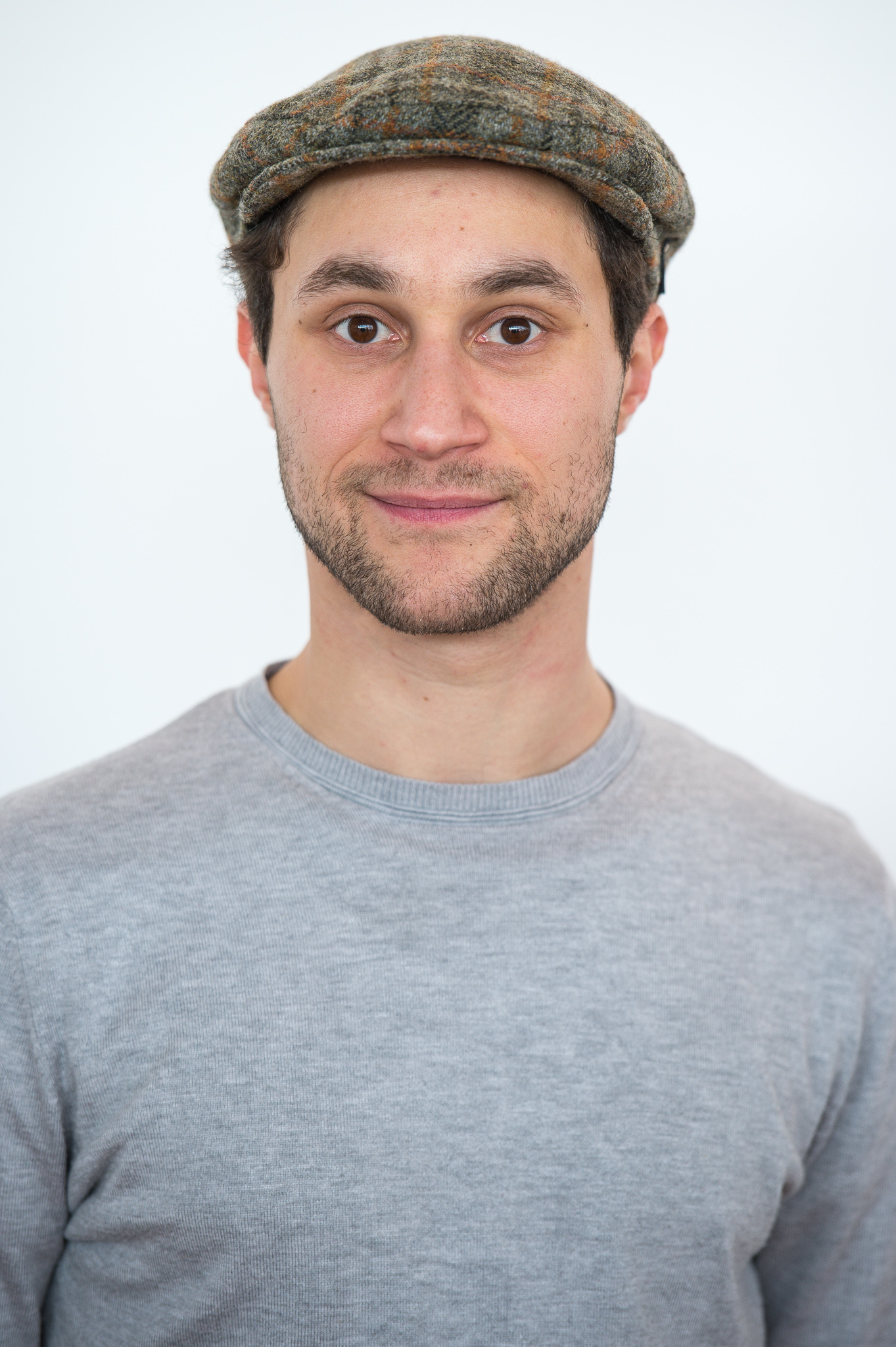
- Born: 17 May 1988 (age 38); East Berlin, East Germany
- Occupation: Actor
- Spouse: Deborah (m. 2011)
- Children: 2

Ludwig Trepte (born 17 May 1988 in East Berlin) is a German television and film actor best known internationally for a leading role as Viktor Goldstein in Generation War (2013) and for his role as Alexander Edel in the German miniseries Deutschland 83 (2015).

== Life and acting career ==
His father is Stephan Trepte who was a member of the East German rock group Lift, Electra and Reform. He did not receive formal drama training and began his acting career at the age of twelve when he appeared in the German television mini-series Beim nächsten Coup wird alles anders (2001).

In 2006, he played the leader of a Nazi clique in his second feature film Combat 16. For his third major role in the feature film Out of Hand, he received the award for best young actor at the 27th Film Festival Max Ophüls Prize 2006.

Furthermore, Trepte was leading actor in the TV movie Auf ewig und einen Tag (2006), the film Seven Days Sunday (2007) and in the television movie Guten Morgen, Herr Grothe (Good Morning, Mr. Grothe) (2007), for which he received the Grimme Prize in 2008. In director Christoph Röhl's film Ein Teil von mir ('A Part of Me') he played a reserved, amiable and out of responsibility for his child, stealing very young man who has surprisingly become a father. In the youth drama Outta Control in 2008, he played the role of a behavioral adolescent, for which he again in 2009 received the Grimme-Preis. In 2009, he went to France, to film What You Don't See directed by Wolfgang Fischer and starring Frederick Lau and Alice Dwyer.

Ludwig Trepte received international attention in 2013 as 'Viktor Goldstein' in the three-part TV movie Generation War (or 'Our Mothers, Our Fathers' in Germany). The film was awarded in 2014 with the international Emmy in the category TV Movie / Mini-Series. In 2013, he stood in front of the camera for the eight-part Danish television series 1864, which revolves around the defeat of Denmark in the German-Danish War of 1864. The script and direction was the responsibility of Ole Bornedal. Also Trepte turned in leading roles for the Christian Schwochow tv film Open the Wall and movie Im Spinnwebhaus. The short film The Last Will by Dustin Loose based on the eponymous short story by Swedish bestselling author Håkan Nesser, It was a Finalist for Foreign Film at the Student Academy Awards in 2015.

In 2014, Ludwig Trepte took over the role of 'Lothar Erler' in the three-part Tannbach - fate of a village under the direction of Alexander Dierbach, in addition to Nadja Uhl, Martina Gedeck and Jonas Nay.

== Awards ==
- 2006: Won - Best Young Actor at the 27th Film Festival Max Ophüls Prize for Keller - Teenage Wasteland
- 2008:the Goldene Kamera's Young Talent Award - "Lilli Palmer & Curd Jürgens Memorial Camera"
- 2009: the Grimme Prize for Guten Morgen, Herr Grothe
- 2012: Nomination – Jupiter Award for Best German Actor for Was du nicht siehst

== Filmography ==
=== Film ===
Year	Title	Role	Notes
2001	Emil and the Detectives	Schüler	
2005	Combat 16	Thomas Thiess	
2005	Out of Hand	Paul	also known as Keller - Teenage Wasteland
2006	Twisted Sister	Matze	
2007	Evil Images	Lukas	(Short)
2007	Seven Days Sunday	Adam	
2008	1st of May: All Belongs to You	'Pelle' Pelletier	
2008	Ein Teil von mir	Jonas	Also known as A Piece of Me, directed by Christoph Röhl
2009	What You Don't See	Anton	
2009	Im nächsten Leben	Firefighter (Feuerwehrmann) Marcel	
2014	The Last Will (or Erledigung einer Sache)	Jakob Adler	(Short), based on the eponymous short story by author Håkan Nesser
2015	Allein unter Irren	Alex Schulte	(Short)
2015	Im Spinnwebhaus	Felix	
2016	Nowhere	Danny	also known as Nirgendwo
2017	Tigermilch	Afghanistan Veteran	
2018	Spielmacher	Anton Weil	
2027	Wind of Change	Klaus Meine	

=== Television ===
Year	Title	Role	Notes
2001	Paulas Schuld	Junge 1	(TV movie)
2001	Beim nächsten Coup wird alles anders	Paper Boy	TV mini-series, 5 episodes
2001	Polizeiruf 110	jüngerer Schüler	TV series, 1 episode
2001-2015	Tatort	Christian Jareis 2001/ Baris Sahin 2008/ Lars Leroux 2011/ Erik Trimborn 2015	TV series, 4 episodes
2002-2014	Küstenwache	Jacob Jäger / Andrej	TV series, 2 episodes
2003	Im Namen des Gesetzes	Stefan Brinkmann	TV series, 1 episode
2004	Sabine!!	Sebastian	TV series, 1 episode
2006	The Secret of St. Ambrose	Julian Cramer	(TV movie)
2006	Auf ewig und einen Tag	Gregor Luckner - Younger	(TV movie)
2006	Der letzte Zeuge	Sezen Aksul	TV series, 1 episode
2007	Verlassen	Marc	(TV movie)
2007	Schimanski	Lena's brother	TV series, 1 episode
2007	Guten Morgen, Herr Grothe	Nico	(TV movie)
2008	Das Duo	Manuel Hertz	TV series, 1 episode
2008	Outta Control	Oliver Rother	(TV Movie, also known as Ihr könnt euch niemals sicher sein
2008	Commissario Laurenti	Michele Giustina	TV series, 1 episode
2010	Kreutzer kommt	Roger	(TV movie)
2010	Aghet - Ein Völkermord	Hambardzoum Sahakian	(TV Movie documentary)
2011	Großstadtrevier	Moritz	TV series, 1 episode
2011	Die Pfefferkörner	Hanno	TV series, 1 episode
2011	Ein Fall für zwei	Uli Caspar	TV series, 1 episode
2012	Deckname Luna	Kurt	(TV movie)
2012	Der Dicke	Lothar Brückner	TV series, 1 episode
2012	Rat mal, wer zur Hochzeit kommt	Hrvoje Tomasovic	(TV movie)
2012	The Last Cop	Simon Hertel	TV series, 1 episode
2013	Afghanistan: A Murderous Decision	Vincent	(TV Movie documentary)
2013	Generation War	Viktor Goldstein	TV mini-series, 3 episodes Known in Germany as Unsere Mütter, unsere Väter.
2013	Der große Schwindel	Florian	(TV movie)
2014	1864	Heinz	TV mini-series, 5 episodes
2014	Open the Wall	Axel Hoffmann	(TV movie)
2014	Letzte Spur Berlin	Arno Schwarz	TV series, 1 episode
2015	Alarm für Cobra 11 - Die Autobahnpolizei	Richie	TV series, 1 episode
2015	Deutschland 83	Oberleutnant Alex Edel	TV series, 8 episodes
2015	Shades of Guilt	Felix	TV series, 1 episode
2015	Tannbach	Lothar Erler	TV series, 3 episodes
2016	Die Kinder der Villa Emma	Josko Indig	(TV movie)
2017	Culpa - Niemand ist ohne Schuld (TV series)	Jonas	TV mini-series, 1 episode
2017	Die Firma dankt	Sandor	(TV movie)
2017	Kommissar Marthaler - Die Sterntaler-Verschwörung	Daniel Fichtner	(TV movie)
2017	Luther and I	Philip Melanchthon	(TV movie)
2017-2018	4 Blocks	Nico	TV series, 7 episodes
2018	Deutschland 86	Alex Edel	TV series, 10 episodes, follows on from Deutschland 83
2018	Tanken: mehr als Super	Daniev	TV series, 12 episodes
2018	Ein starkes Team	Jan Tarp	TV series, 1 episode
2019	Bauhaus - A New Era	Marcel Breuer	TV series, 6 episodes

== Personal life ==
Trepte is married and lives in Berlin with his wife Deborah, who works at a film PR agency, and their daughter Mathilda, born in 2011. On 20 August 2018 it was announced that he and his wife are expecting their second child. He has three half-brothers and a half-sister.
