= Winiger =

Winiger is a surname. Notable people with the surname include:

- Josef Winiger (1855–1929), Swiss politician
- Melanie Winiger (born 1979), Swiss actress, model, and beauty pageant titleholder
- Samim Winiger, Swiss producer of electronic dance music

== See also ==
- Winger (surname)
