= Winger (surname) =

Winger is a surname.

Notable people with the surname include:

- Anna Winger (born 1970), American writer and artist
- Debra Winger (born 1955), American actress
- Joerg Winger (born 1969), German manager
- Kara Winger (born 1986), American track and field athlete
- Kip Winger (born 1961), American bass player and singer/songwriter
- Mark Winger (born 1962), American convicted murderer
- Odd Winger (1923–1998), Norwegian journalist, novelist, and children's writer
- Richard Winger (born 1943), American political activist and analyst
- Rob Winger (born 1974), Canadian poet
