= Deutschland 83 =

2015 German television series

- Intertitle from the international release
- Genre: Cold War espionage
- Created by: Anna Winger; Joerg Winger
- Written by: Anna Winger
- Directed by: Edward Berger; Samira Radsi
- Starring: Jonas Nay; Maria Schrader; Ulrich Noethen; Sylvester Groth; Sonja Gerhardt; Ludwig Trepte; Alexander Beyer; Lisa Tomaschewsky
- Opening theme: "Major Tom (Coming Home)" by Peter Schilling
- Composer: Reinhold Heil
- Countries of origin: Germany; United States
- Original languages: German; English
- No. of seasons: 1
- No. of episodes: 8

Production
- Producers: Joerg Winger; Nico Hofmann; Henriette Lippold
- Cinematography: Philipp Haberlandt; Frank Küpper
- Editor: Sven Budelmann
- Production company: UFA Fiction

Original release
- Network: RTL (Germany); Sundance TV (US)
- Release: 17 June – 5 August 2015

Related
- Deutschland 86

Deutschland 83 is a 2015 German spy thriller television series starring Jonas Nay as a 24-year-old native of East Germany who is sent to West Germany in 1983 as an undercover spy for the HVA, the foreign intelligence agency of the Stasi. It is a co-production of AMC Networks' SundanceTV and RTL Television, by the production company UFA Fiction, with international distribution by RTL Group's FremantleMedia International and North American distribution by Kino Lorber.

The series premiered on 17 June 2015 on the SundanceTV channel in the United States, becoming the first German-language series to air on a US network. The broadcast was in the original German, with English subtitles. It subsequently aired in Germany beginning in November 2015, and in the UK on Channel 4 beginning in January 2016. Despite weak initial ratings in Germany, Deutschland 83 became a sleeper hit.

The series was officially renewed on 14 October 2016; the second series is named Deutschland 86. Deutschland 86 is set in 1986, three years after the original season; it premiered in Germany on 19 October 2018.

A third season, Deutschland 89, was broadcast from 25 September 2020, 1989 being the year of the fall of the Berlin Wall. In a December 2017 interview, it was confirmed that Amazon Germany had secured the rights to Deutschland 89.

== Cast ==
=== Main ===
- Jonas Nay as Martin Rauch, code name Kolibri (Hummingbird), a border patrol guard from East Germany, who goes undercover in West Germany as an oberleutnant and aide-de-camp to Major General Edel, impersonating the murdered Lieutenant Moritz Stamm.
- Maria Schrader as Lenora Rauch, Martin's aunt and one of his handlers for the Stasi. She is a cultural attaché of the East German Permanent Mission (StäV) in Bonn.
- Ulrich Noethen as Generalmajor Wolfgang Edel, Martin's boss in the Bundeswehr. General Edel works with the Americans at NATO on the deployment of Pershing II Weapon System missiles.
- Sylvester Groth as Walter Schweppenstette, Martin's father and Lenora's boss at the East German Mission.
- Sonja Gerhardt as Annett Schneider, Martin's fiancée who lives in Kleinmachnow, East Germany.
- Ludwig Trepte as Oberleutnant Alexander "Alex" Edel, General Edel's son who serves in the military with Martin.
- Alexander Beyer as Tobias Tischbier, a professor at the University of Bonn and Martin's handler who works in the Stasi's foreign arm, the Main Directorate for Reconnaissance (HVA).
- Lisa Tomaschewsky as Yvonne Edel, General Edel's daughter who is a member of the Bhagwan Shree Rajneesh cult.

=== Recurring ===
- Carina Wiese as Ingrid Rauch, Martin's mother who lives in Kleinmachnow.
- Vladimir Burlakov as Thomas Posimski, Martin's friend who has an affair with Annett while Martin is away.
- Godehard Giese as Lieutenant Colonel Karl Kramer, a fellow spy who helps Martin.
- Errol T. Harewood as Major General Arnold Jackson, the American general who works with General Edel on the deployment of the Pershing II Weapon System missiles.
- Michaela Caspar as Mrs. Netz, General Edel's secretary.
- Jens Albinus as Henrik Mayer, NATO head analyst.
- Nikola Kastner as Linda Seiler, Mayer's secretary.

== Episodes ==
Creator Anna Winger said that all of the episode names originated from NATO military exercises from 1983.

No.	Title	Directed by	Written by	US airdate	German airdate	Viewers (millions)
1	"Quantum Jump"	Edward Berger	Anna Winger and Oliver Smith	17 June 2015	26 November 2015	U.S.: 0.066; German: 3.19
In 1983, East Germany's Secret Service is concerned by American military plans in West Germany. East German Secret Service employee Lenora Rauch sends her nephew to West Germany to act as a spy.
2	"Brave Guy"	Edward Berger	Steve Bailie and Anna Winger	24 June 2015	26 November 2015	U.S.: 0.074; German: 2.86
Tischbier orders Martin to break into NATO head analyst Henrik Mayer (Jens Albinus)'s hotel room to steal a secret report. He refuses until Tischbier promises to help his mother who is suffering from kidney disease in East Germany.
3	"Atlantic Lion"	Edward Berger	Anna Winger and Oliver Smith	1 July 2015	3 December 2015	U.S.: 0.077; German: 2.05
While at a NATO conference in Brussels, Martin gets an assignment to seduce and bug the head security analyst's secretary, Linda Seiler (Nikola Kastner).
4	"Northern Wedding"	Edward Berger	Andrea Willson and Anna Winger	8 July 2015	3 December 2015	U.S.: 0.100; German: 1.96
NATO is placed on high alert when the bug is found in Linda's desk. Martin scrambles to turn Linda's loyalties around while under interrogation by NATO security about their relationship.
5	"Cold Fire"	Edward Berger	Anna Winger and Oliver Smith	15 July 2015	10 December 2015	U.S.: 0.143; German: 1.69
Tischbier arrives at the commune to retrieve Martin and tell him that his mother will have her kidney transplant but Martin is the donor. He must get to East Berlin after delivering a package to a mysterious man.
6	"Brandy Station"	Samira Radsi	Ralph Martin and Anna Winger	22 July 2015	10 December 2015	U.S.: 0.082; German: 1.67
Martin wants to stay home now, but his fiancee Annett tells him to go West again. Alex takes General Jackson hostage and forces him to film a denunciation of US military plans in Western Europe.
7	"Bold Guard"	Samira Radsi	Georg Hartmann and Anna Winger	29 July 2015	17 December 2015	U.S.: 0.072; German: 1.72
As preparations for NATO's nuclear war game "Able Archer" intensify, Martin receives an order from East Germany that cements his fears about their paranoia. Martin blows his own cover in order to warn his superiors in the West that the East German HQ thinks that the exercise is a real act of war. Under arrest, he escapes from the base and heads towards East Germany.
8	"Able Archer"	Samira Radsi	Anna Winger and Oliver Smith	5 August 2015	17 December 2015	U.S.: 0.107; German: 1.63
The fear of a pre-emptive nuclear strike against the West had become a possibility at the East German HQ, while in the West, war game Able Archer reaches its peak. Martin finally manages to talk to high ranked officers in the East, revealing the deliberate misinterpretation of the conclusions of NATO's report by high-ranking East German officials.

== Production ==
The show was created by the husband and wife team of American novelist Anna Winger and German TV producer Joerg Winger, who pitched it as a trilogy. It is produced by Joerg Winger, Nico Hofmann, and Henriette Lippold. Anna Winger said that they did extensive research with experts who were from both sides of Germany. Historian Klaas Voss from the Hamburg Institute for Social Research was very important in providing historical information. Jonas Nay, who played Martin, said he received technical assistance from military adviser/NATO expert Steffen Meier.

The show was shot in and around locations in Berlin, Germany. A suburb in east Berlin was used to portray period East Germany. For some scenes the Stasi headquarters (German: Ministerium für Staatssicherheit) was used as a location and the production was able to film at the Stasi Museum, which is the actual site of the original headquarters. The actual headquarters for the HVA was however in Gosen about 28 km (17 mi) south east of the Berlin TV tower, less than 1 km (0.6 mi) SE of the Berlin city limits, and approximately 4.5 miles (7.2 km) south of the city of Erkner. The backup bunker for the headquarters of the HVA was also located there.

Directors Edward Berger and Samira Radsi used the same crew—and often the same locations—to shoot their respective episodes. One director would prepare for shooting while the other was shooting. They worked in parallel like this throughout the filming of the show. Radsi said she knew producer Winger from working together on the popular German TV show, Leipzig Homicide.

SundanceTV created a digital marketing strategy that reflected the use of locations in Germany that were meant to recreate both East and West Germany in the early 1980s. Reflecting both the intertitle of the show, the marketing team created sliders that show locations as they were in contrast to the current day. The opening credits were created by Saskia Marka.

== Music ==
The show uses 1980s popular music extensively, including Nena's "99 Luftballons", David Bowie, New Order and Eurythmics. Each week's episode has a playlist of music from and/or inspired by the episodes. The score was created by Reinhold Heil, who produced the song "99 Luftballons".

Heil, who often collaborates with Tom Tykwer (Run Lola Run), said that he was on board with the project when he saw the first scene of the show, where two teenagers are being interrogated by the border guards (one of whom was Martin, the main character) for attempting to smuggle two books by Shakespeare and Marx across the border. He said that it was very realistic, reminiscent of a similar experience he had when he was caught smuggling music (Stravinsky and Bach).

- Episode 1 – "Quantum Jump": DJ Geespin of Power 105.1
- Episode 2 – "Brave Guy": WFMU Station Manager Ken
- Episode 3 – "Atlantic Lion": DJ John Fell Ryan of the NYC band Excepter and the documentary Room 237
- Episode 4 – "Northern Wedding": DJ Jonathan Tooubin of New York Night Train
- Episode 5 – "Cold Fire": DJ Takefive of CÜR Music
- Episode 6 – "Brandy Station": Top 10 Songs of 1983 According to Billboard
- Episode 7 – "Bold Guard": DJ David John Bishop
- Episode 8 – "Able Archer": Composer Reinhold Heil
- Episode 8 – "Able Archer" (finale bonus): Creator Anna Winger

The theme for the respective English-subtitled North American and UK broadcasts of the series featured Peter Schilling's "Major Tom (Coming Home)" – the English-language version of Schilling's big 1983 European hit "Major Tom (völlig losgelöst)". The same version of the opening sequence was subsequently used in syndication in most other countries. However, the markedly different introductory sequence for the German broadcast of the series used New Order's 1983 hit "Blue Monday".

== Critical response ==
Deutschland 83 was met with critical acclaim and received a 2015 Peabody Award. Rotten Tomatoes gives the show a 95% score with an average rating of 7.8/10, sampled from 37 reviews. The consensus states: "An engrossing drama with a fun '80s soundtrack, Deutschland 83 chronicles an intense spy story that brings viewers uncomfortably close to the Iron Curtain." On Metacritic, it holds a score of 79 out of 100, based on reviews from 11 critics, indicating "generally favorable reviews".

The first two episodes of Deutschland 83 premiered at the Berlinale 2015 to very positive reviews. In its US television premiere, it also received positive reviews, with mention of its humor and successful depiction of a Cold War thriller, with favorable comparisons to the US show, The Americans. Many critics called it the best show of the summer of 2015.

Writing in The New Yorker, Emily Nussbaum called the show a gorgeous, slinky thriller, praising its recreation of 1983 Germany as "nearly as aesthetically aspirational" as Mad Men. She questioned the plot line's credibility as Martin's character repeatedly landed, Zelig-like, "at the center of world-historical events", but didn't deem this to be a "deal-breaker". In a mixed review, The New York Times compared the series to shows on the network The CW, given that it focuses on a young adult struggling with being "the only glimmer of sanity in a world gone mad".

Clemens Poellinger from the Swedish newspaper Svenska Dagbladet awarded the series a 5/6 rating. He praises the "excellence in time-faithful environment and details" but also points out the similarities with the series Weissensee.

Philip Oltermann of The Guardian praised the idea of viewing the Cold War from an East German's perspective, but wrote that the show, instead of taking advantage of its "radical premise", "backtracks into stereotype" by portraying East German officers as "cruel ideologues", and the West German peace movement as "infiltrated not just by Soviet agents, but gay Soviet agents at that".

Margret Lyons of Vulture.com praised the work of title designer Saskia Marka, because a "huge part of Deutschland is about pop culture, and music in particular, so of course the titles include a famous German pop song of the era, Peter Schilling's 'Major Tom.'" Marka's opening credits "combine the song's synth vibes with more ominous historical imagery and a little bit of the show's humor. It's the series in a nutshell."

== Awards ==
Deutschland 83 has received a number of international and domestic awards including an International Emmy Award, a Peabody Award, Grimme Prize, The Golden Nymph, a Metropolis Award, two C21 Drama Awards, a Golden Camera, the "Special Jury Award" of the Roma Fiction Fest, and Series Mania 2015 for Best World Series.

== Broadcast ==
The series premiered in the United States on 17 June 2015, on SundanceTV, making it the first German-language series to air on a US network.

The success of Deutschland 83 in the US and UK paved the way for another series also featuring a young Stasi agent dispatched to West Germany under an assumed identity, The Same Sky.

In Germany, Deutschland 83 began to air after the US run on RTL 26 November 2015. There, the series lost viewers over the course of its run; the series finale had 1.72 million viewers, or approximately half of the series premiere's viewers. As a result, German newspaper Bild called the show "the flop of the year".

It premiered in Ireland on 29 November 2015, on RTÉ2. All episodes were added to Australian streaming service Stan in December 2015. On 14 January 2016, the series was made available for streaming in The Netherlands via Videoland.

It premiered on Channel 4 in the United Kingdom on 3 January 2016, with the final two episodes shown back-to-back on 14 February. It has since become the most popular foreign-language drama in the history of British television with an audience of 2.5 million viewers as of January 2016.

The series was aired for Iran, Afghanistan and Tajikistan by BBC Persian in October 2017.

== See also ==
- Able Archer 83
- Cold War (1979–85)
- Korean Air Lines Flight 007
- Main Directorate for Reconnaissance
- 1983 French consulate attack in West Berlin
- NATO Double-Track Decision
- Pershing II Weapon System
- Strategic Defense Initiative
- Erich Honecker
- Ronald Reagan
