= Florence Kasumba =

German actress (born 1976)

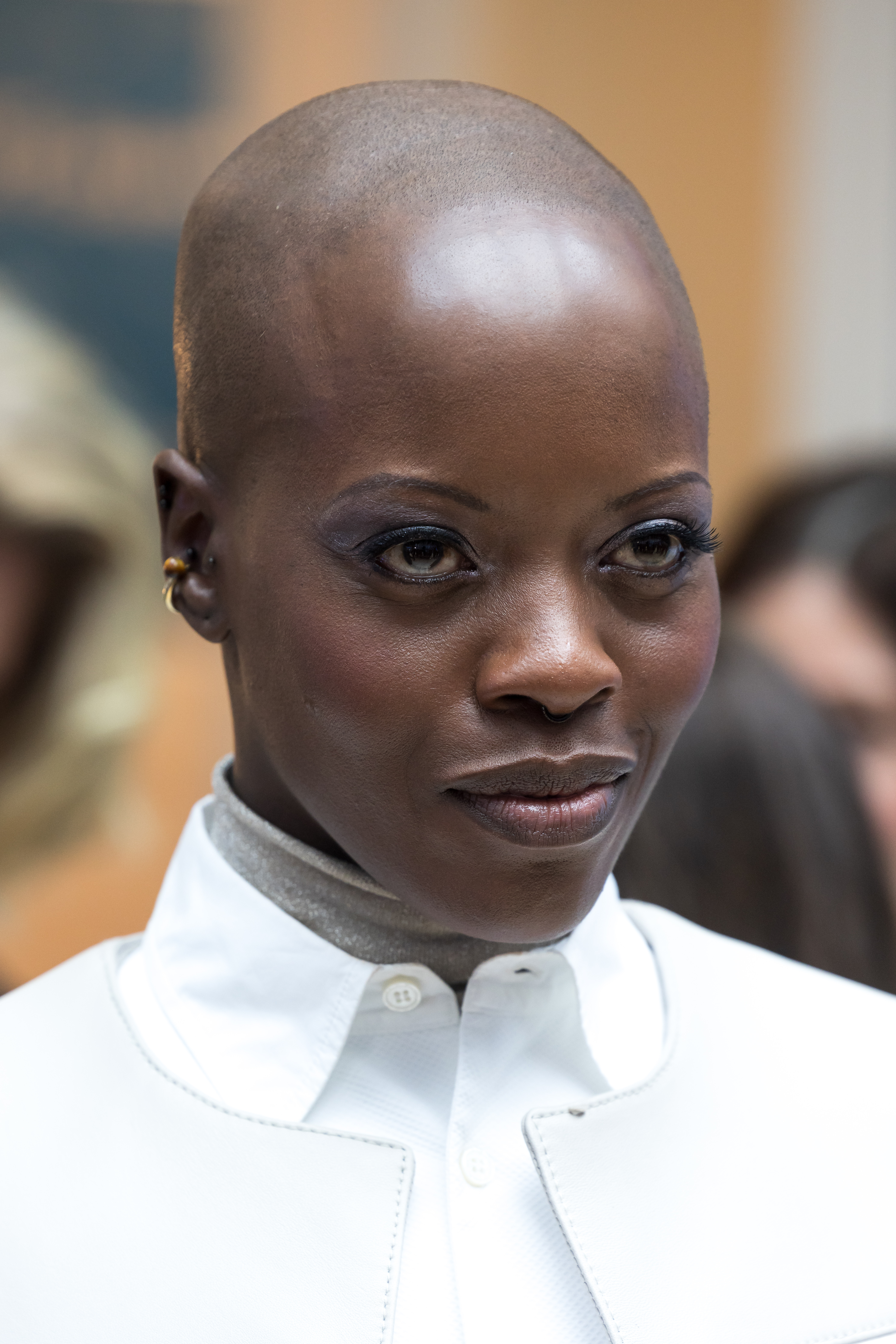
- Kasumba in 2024
- Born: 26 October 1976 (age 50); Kampala, Uganda
- Citizenship: Uganda; Germany
- Education: Fontys University of Applied Sciences in Tilburg, the Netherlands
- Occupation: Actress
- Years active: 2001–present
- Website: www.florencekasumba.com

Florence Kasumba (born 26 October 1976) is a Ugandan-born German actress. She is best known for her portrayal of Ayo in the Marvel Cinematic Universe, including the films Captain America: Civil War (2016), Black Panther (2018), Avengers: Infinity War (2018), Black Panther: Wakanda Forever (2022), and the Disney+ series The Falcon and the Winter Soldier (2021). She is also known for her acting in German and Dutch films. She played Senator Acantha in Wonder Woman (2017), Shenzi in The Lion King (2019), and the Wicked Witch of the East in the NBC television series Emerald City (2017).

== Early life ==
Florence Kasumba was born on 26 October 1976 in Kampala, Uganda. She spent her childhood in Essen, Germany, where she attended elementary school and high school. After watching the musical Starlight Express at the age of 12, she was inspired to become a performer. She earned her degree in acting, singing, and dancing from Fontys University of Applied Sciences in Tilburg, the Netherlands. Kasumba is fluent in German, English, and Dutch. She resides in Berlin, Germany.

== Career ==
While she was still studying in college, Kasumba landed her first professional film role, Silke, in the Dutch motion picture hit Ik ook van jou. After graduating from college, she performed in many musicals, such as Chicago, The Lion King, Cats, West Side Story, Evita, and Beauty and the Beast. Florence Kasumba travelled to New York City and was cast in the title role in Germany's premiere production of Elton John's international hit musical Aida. She also played Lisa in Germany's premiere cast of Mamma Mia.

Kasumba has appeared in a variety of Dutch, German and English language films and television series.

Kasumba made her Marvel Cinematic Universe debut in the 2016 film Captain America: Civil War. Her role was credited as a security guard for Black Panther, and she received widespread praise for her brief scene in which she threatens Black Widow by ordering her to "Move or you will be moved." Kasumba reprised the character, Ayo, a member of the all-female Dora Milaje fighting squad, in the Black Panther solo film, Avengers: Infinity War, and the streaming series The Falcon and the Winter Soldier.

She played Senator Acantha in 2017's Wonder Woman and the Wicked Witch of the East in the NBC television series Emerald City. She splits her time between U.S. and German film and TV productions.

In 2019, Kasumba landed the character of Shenzi in the animated remake, The Lion King (2019) directed by Jon Favreau, alongside Keegan-Michael Key and Eric André as Ed and Banzai

== Awards and nominations ==
She was nominated for the Black Entertainment Film Fashion Television & Arts Award for International Rising Star in 2016, against Lupita Nyong'o, John Boyega and Lisa Awuku. Kasumba appeared alongside Nyong'o in Black Panther.

== Filmography ==
=== Film ===
Year	Title	Role	Director(s)	Notes
2001	I Love You Too	Silke	Ruud van Hemert	
2006	The Stoning	Nilophé	Harald Holzenleiter	
2012	Transpapa	Tessi	Sarah-Judith Mettke	
2014	Age of Cannibals	Florence	Johannes Naber	
2016	Offline: Are You Ready for the Next Level?	Skuld	Florian Schnell	
2016	Captain America: Civil War	Ayo	Anthony & Joe Russo	Cameo; Credited "Security Chief"
2016	How Men Talk About Women	Sabine	Henrik Regel	
2017	Wonder Woman	Senator Acantha	Patty Jenkins	
2017	Arthur & Claire	Maitre	Miguel Alexandre	
2018	Black Panther	Ayo	Ryan Coogler	
2018	Avengers: Infinity War	Ayo	Anthony & Joe Russo	
2018	Mute	Tanya	Duncan Jones	
2019	The Lion King	Shenzi La Hyène	Jon Favreau	(voice)
2022	Black Panther: Wakanda Forever	Ayo	Ryan Coogler	
2022	A Midsummer Night's Dream	Hippolyta	Sacha Bennett	
2023	Get Up	Natalie	Lea Becker	

=== Television ===
Year	Title	Role	Notes
2006–2016	Tatort	Various	7 episodes
2007	Die Familienanwältin	Mboose Thallert	
2007	Four Women and a Funeral	Freedom	
2010	Vienna Crime Squad	Mira Wiesinger	
2012	Das Vermächtnis der Wanderhure	Alika	TV movie
2013	Großstadtrevier	Sisi Ngoro	
2013	Der letzte Bulle	Denise Mokaba	
2013	In aller Freundschaft	Imani Kutesa	
2014	The Quest	Talmuh	10 episodes
2015	Es kommt noch besser	Doctor	TV movie
2015	Letzte Spur Berlin	Madame Manyong	Episode: "Abseitsfalle"
2015	Dominion	Daria	3 episodes
2016–2017	Emerald City	East	3 episodes
2017	Dr. Klein	Grace Kahindi-Bäumer	Episode: "Pläne"
2018	Alarm für Cobra 11 - Die Autobahnpolizei	FBI Agent Karen Morris	Episode: "Most Wanted"
2018	Deutschland 86	Rose Seithathi	10 episodes
2019–2024	Tatort	Anaïs Schmitz	5 episodes
2019	Criminal: Germany	Antje Borchert	3 episodes
2020	Spides	Officer Nique Navar	8 episodes
2020	Deutschland 89	Rose Seithathi	
2020	Blind ermittelt - Zerstörte Träume	Solveig Schachner	TV movie
2021	The Falcon and the Winter Soldier	Ayo	3 episodes
2021	Marvel Studios: Assembled	Herself	Documentary; Episode: "Assembled: The Making of The Falcon and the Winter Soldier"
2021	Kitz	Regine Forsell	5 episodes
2022	Cold Case History	Herself	Documentary; 6 Episodes
2023	Kizazi Moto: Generation Fire	Katono (voice)	Episode: "Herderboy"
