= Michaela Caspar =

German actress (born 1960)

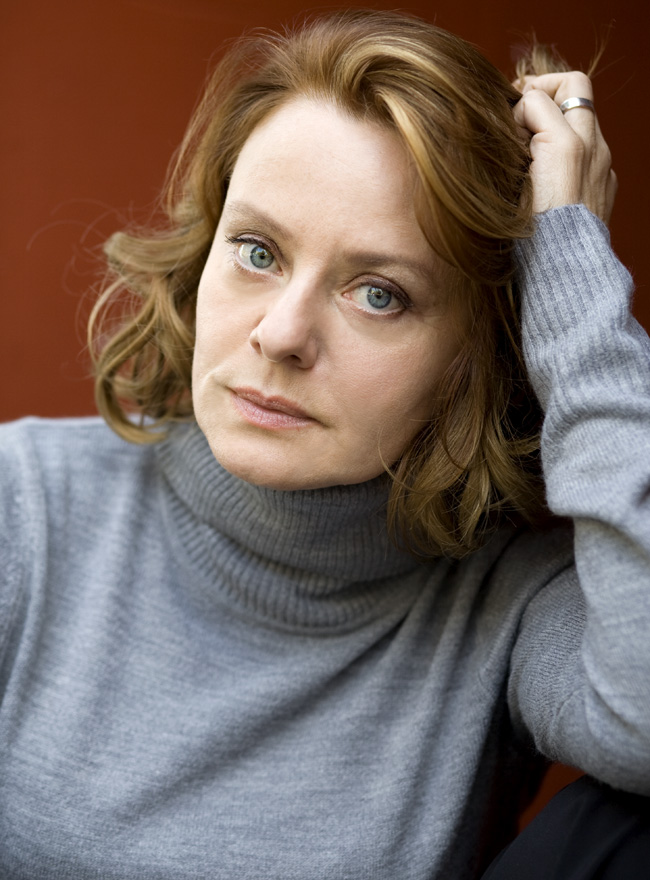
- Born: 1960 (age 64–65); Germany
- Occupation: Actress
- Years active: 2000–present

Michaela Caspar (born 1960) is a German actress.

== Selected filmography ==
- Last Stop Toyland (2009) as Rektorin
- The Grand Budapest Hotel (2014) as Marguerite
- Hitman: Agent 47 (2015) as the Hall of Records Clerk
- The Seasons (2025), voice only

== Selected television ==
- In aller Freundschaft (2000) as Linda Jakubeit (Episode: "Zwischen zwei Leben")
- Der Fahnder (2000)
- In aller Freundschaft (2003) as Iris Heine (Episode: "Isoliert")
- Leipzig Homicide (2003) as Frau Brockwitz (Episode: "Benni und die Detektive")
- Leipzig Homicide (2010) as Ruth Böttcher (Episode: "Der Aufstand")
- Stromberg (2011–2012) as Frau Papenacker (4 episodes)
- Tatort (2011) as Martina Kästner (Episode: "Schwarze Tiger, weiße Löwen")
- Tatort (2015) as Simone Mendt (Episode: "Preis des Lebens")
- Deutschland 83 (2015) as Frau Netz
- Tatort (2016) as Birgit Meggle (Episode: "Fünf Minuten Himmel")
- Bella Block (2018) as Frau Paslak (Episode: "Stille Wasser")
- Deutschland 86 (2018) as Frau Netz
