= The Girl with Nine Wigs =

- Theatrical release poster
- German: Heute bin ich blond
- Directed by: Marc Rothemund
- Screenplay by: Katharina Eyssen
- Based on: Heute bin ich blond: Das Mädchen mit den neun Perücken by Sophie van der Stap
- Produced by: Andreas Bareiß; Sven Burgemeister
- Starring: Lisa Tomaschewsky; Karoline Teska; David Rott; Alice Dwyer; Maike Bollow; Peter Prager; Alexander Held; Daniel Zillmann; Jasmin Gerat
- Cinematography: Martin Langer
- Edited by: Simon Gstöttmayr
- Music by: Mousse T.; Johan Hoogewijs
- Production companies: Goldkind Filmproduktion; Scope Pictures; ARD Degeto
- Distributed by: Universum Filmverleih (Germany); A-Film Benelux (Belgium)
- Release dates: 28 March 2013 (Germany); 4 September 2013 (Belgium)
- Running time: 115 minutes
- Countries: Germany; Belgium
- Language: German
- Box office: $1.1 million

The Girl with Nine Wigs (German: Heute bin ich blond, lit. 'Today I Am Blond') is a 2013 biographical comedy-drama film directed by Marc Rothemund, based on the autobiography Heute bin ich blond: Das Mädchen mit den neun Perücken by Sophie van der Stap.

== Cast ==
- Lisa Tomaschewsky as Sophie Ritter
- Karoline Teska as Annabel
- David Rott as Rob
- Alice Dwyer as Saskia Ritter
- Maike Bollow as Inge Ritter
- Peter Prager as Wolfgang Ritter
- Alexander Held as Dr. Friedrich Leonhard
- Jasmin Gerat as Chantal
