= This Is Love (2009 film) =

- Directed by: Matthias Glasner
- Starring: Corinna Harfouch; Jens Albinus
- Release date: 20 September 2009 (SFF)
- Running time: 1h 46min
- Country: Germany
- Language: German

This Is Love is a 2009 German drama film directed by Matthias Glasner.

== Cast ==
- Corinna Harfouch - Maggie
- Jens Albinus - Chris
- Duyen Pham - Jenjira
- Jürgen Vogel - Holger
- Devid Striesow - Roland
- Ernst Stötzner - Jörg
- Valerie Koch - Nina
- Tatja Seibt - Emma
- Jesper Christensen - Koller
- Knut Berger - Herr Teichmann
- Marina Bouras - Dänische Sekretärin
- Marita Breuer - Simone
- Margarita Broich - Frau Teichmann
- Rosa Enskat - Winnie

== Awards and nominations ==
- 2009: San Sebastián International Film Festival - Official Competition
- 2010: German Film Award - Nomination in the category Best Performance by an Actress in a Leading Role for Corinna Harfouch
- 2010: Type Directors Club - Certificate Of Typographic Excellence for Saskia Marka (title designer)
