= Jens Albinus =

Danish actor and director (born 1965)

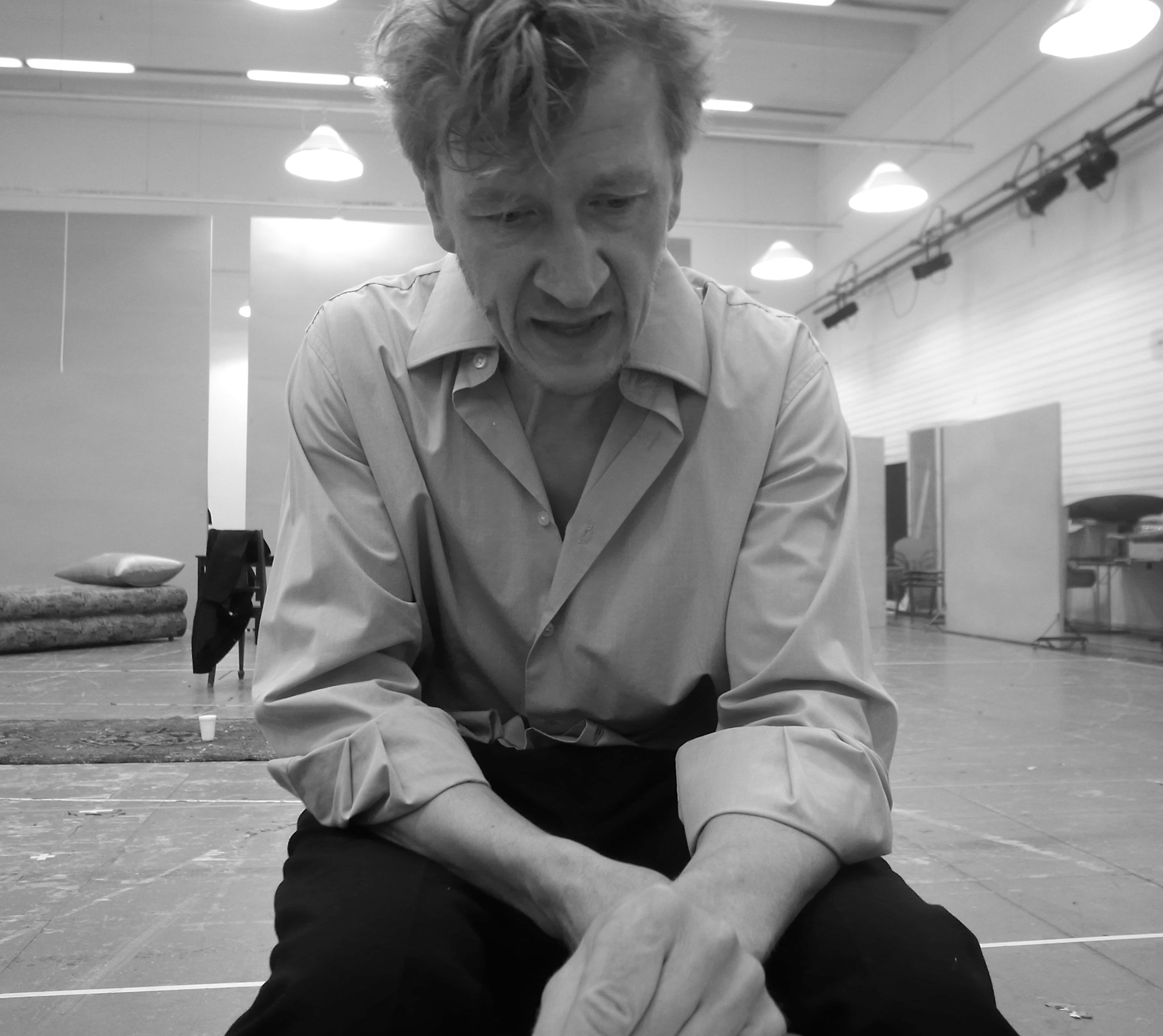
- Albinus in 2012
- Born: 3 January 1965 (age 61); Bogense, Denmark
- Partner: Marina Bouras (2004–present)
- Children: 2 with Bouras; 1 with ex-wife Cecilia Westerberg

Jens Albinus (born 3 January 1965 in Bogense) is a Danish actor and director.

== Selected filmography ==
- Anton (1996) – as Lærer, a teacher
- Portland (1996) – as Carsten
- Bryggeren (TV mini series, 1997) – as Hans Christian Andersen
- The Idiots (1998) – as Stoffer
- Din for altid (short, 1999) – as Jeppe
- Zacharias Carl Borg (short, 2000) – as Zacharias Carl Borg
- Dancer in the Dark (2000) – as Morty
- The Bench (2000) – as Kim
- Gottlieb (short, 2001) – as Martin Gottlieb
- Far from China (2001) – as John
- Facing the Truth (2002) – as Richard Malmros
- Udvidelse af kampzonen (TV movie, 2002) – director and writer
- In Your Hands (2004) – as Carsten
- The Eagle (TV series, 2004–2006) – as Hallgrim "Ørn" Hallgrimsson
- The Boss of It All (2006) - as The Boss of It All/Kristoffer/Svend E
- Daisy Diamond (2007) - as Kunde
- This Is Love (2009) - as Chris
- Everything will be Fine (2010) - as Jacob Falk
- Borgen (TV series, 2010-2013, 2022) - as Jon Berthelsen
- Nymphomaniac (2013) - as S
- Silent Heart (2014) - as Michael
- Deutschland 83 (TV mini series, 2015) - as Henrik Mayer
- The Idealist (2015) - as Blicher
- The Audition (2019) - as Christian Wels
- My Little Sister (2020) - as Martin
