= Sylvester Groth =

German actor (born 1958)

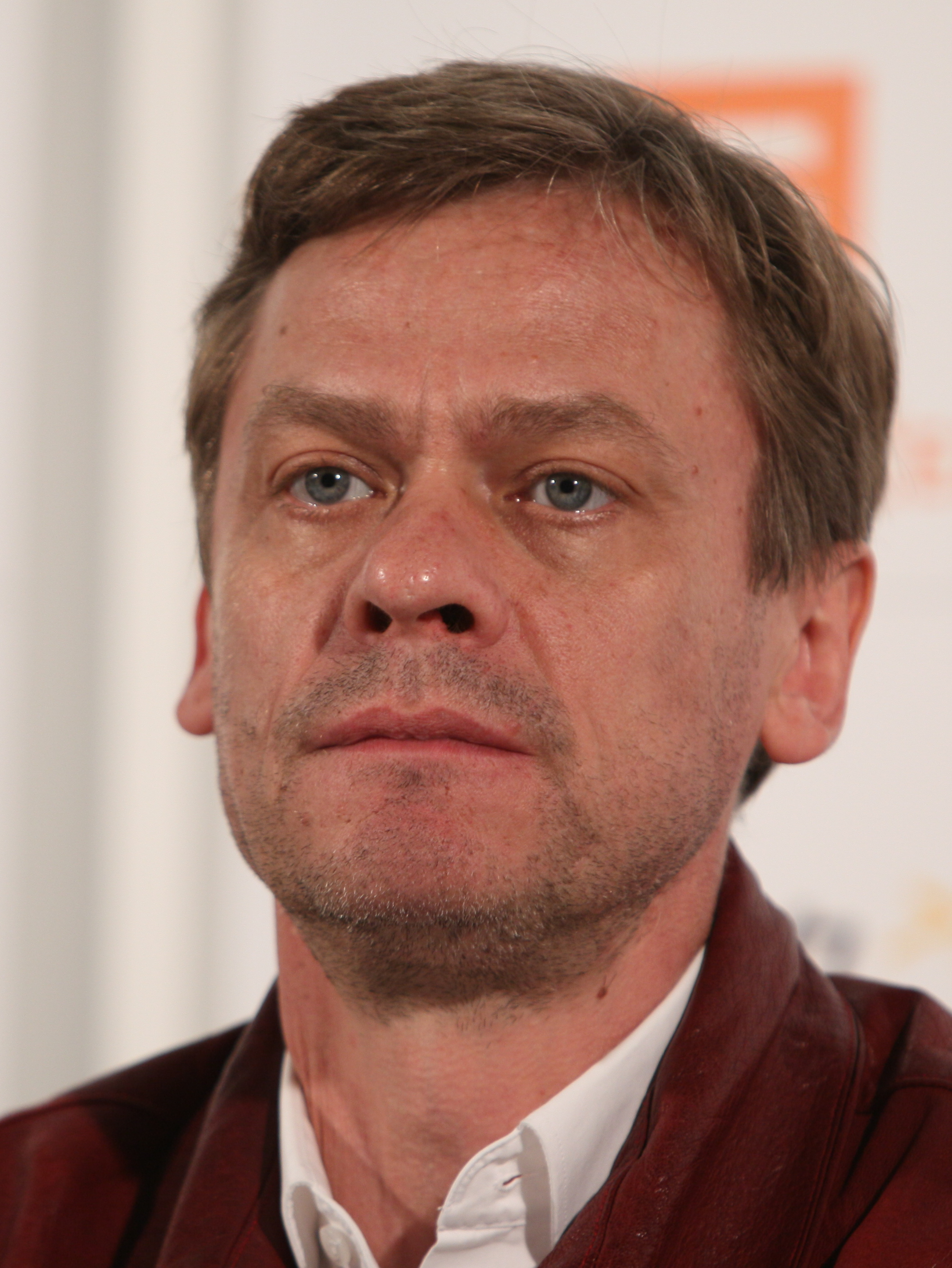
- Groth in 2009
- Born: 31 March 1958 (age 68); Jerichow, Bezirk Magdeburg, East Germany
- Occupation: Actor
- Years active: 1980–present

Sylvester Groth (born 31 March 1958) is a German theater, television, and film actor. He is best known to international audiences from his appearances in Hollywood movies including Inglourious Basterds and The Man from U.N.C.L.E. Furthermore, he has appeared in the Netflix series Sense8, Fargo, and Dark.

== Biography ==
Groth is the youngest of five siblings from Jerichow (Bezirk Magdeburg) in the former German Democratic Republic, where he also spent his childhood. His family is from Upper Silesia. Groth's father died while he was still young, and his mother married a second time. When he was 14 years old, the family moved to Leipzig. In 1986, he escaped from East Germany to West Germany.

He studied acting and singing at the Ernst Busch Academy of Dramatic Arts in Berlin. This was followed by engagements in Schwerin, Dresden, and Berlin, where he worked as a guest actor at the Deutsches Theater and from 1986 to 1989 at the Schaubühne. He also worked at the Residenz Theater, the Munich Kammerspiele, the Berliner Ensemble, the Burgtheater in Vienna, and the Salzburg Festival.

In addition to an extensive theater career, Groth has also acted in numerous television productions and feature films. His first major film role was in 1983 in the East German film The Turning Point, based on a novel by Hermann Kant. In 1986, he appeared in Johannes Schaaf's adaptation of Michael Ende's story Momo. In 1992, he acted in the war drama Stalingrad and in 2006 he took on the role of Nazi Minister of Propaganda Joseph Goebbels in Dani Levy's My Führer – The Really Truest Truth about Adolf Hitler.

Groth is known to English-language audiences for appearing in Quentin Tarantino's 2009 film, Inglourious Basterds, in which he again portrayed Goebbels. More recently, he held a leading role in the Netflix series Dark as Clausen, a police investigator, as well as appearing in the first episode of the third season of Fargo.

In January 2013, the Film Museum in Potsdam honoured Groth with a retrospective. On 1 December 2017, he received an award from the DEFA Foundation for his outstanding achievements in German film.

== Selected filmography ==
=== Film ===
List of film appearances, with year, title, and role shown
Year	Title	Role	Notes
1983	The Turning Point	Mark Niebuhr	
1986	The House on the River	Heinz Hüsgen	
1986	Momo	Agent BLW/553 X	
1992	The Last U-Boat	Funker Maschke	
1993	Stalingrad	Otto	
2003	The Third Wave	Dauphin	
2006	Nevermore	Pfarrer Ekdahl	
2007	My Führer – The Really Truest Truth about Adolf Hitler	Joseph Goebbels	
2008	The Reader	Prosecutor	
2008	Buddenbrooks	Kesselmayer	
2009	Hilde	Boleslaw Barlog	
2009	Inglourious Basterds	Joseph Goebbels	
2010	Aghet – Ein Völkermord	Martin Niepage	Documentary
2015	Naked Among Wolves	Helmut Krämer	
2015	The Man from U.N.C.L.E.	Uncle Rudi	
2017	In Times of Fading Light	Kurt Umnitzer	
2019	Berlin, I Love You	Frosch	
2022	The 355	Jonas Muller	

=== Television ===
List of television appearances, with year, title, and role shown
Year	Title	Role	Notes
1990	Rote Erde	Fritz Rewandowski	
2003	Tatort: Stiller Tod	Justus Fürmann, public prosecutor	
2004	Mein Leben & Ich		4 episodes
2005	Tatort: Rache-Engel	Chief of police	
2007	Rosa Roth	Michael Katzmann	
2007, 2013	Der Kriminalist		2 episodes
2010	KDD – Kriminaldauerdienst	Richard Plötz	1 episode
2011	Tatort: Das Dorf	Medical examiner	
2012, 2014	The Old Fox		2 episodes
2012	Tatort: Die schöne Mona ist tot	Christian Seitz	
2010	Generation War	Sturmbannführer/Standartenführer Hiemer	2 episodes
2010	Tatort: Schwarzer Afghane	Norbert Müller	
2010	Tatort: Wer das Schweigen bricht	Rainer Vaske	
2013–2015	Polizeiruf 110	Jochen Drexler	4 parts
2015	Sense8	Sergei Bogdanow	4 episodes
2015	Deutschland 83	Walter Schweppenstette	8 episodes
2016	NSU German History X: The Investigators	Walter Ahler	
2017	Tatort: Wacht am Rhein	Dieter Gottschalk	
2017	Fargo	Colonel Horst Lagerfeld	1 episode
2018	Deutschland 86	Walter Schweppenstette	10 episodes
2019	Dark	Clausen	
2019	Criminal: Germany	Detective Chief Inspector Karl Schultz	3 episodes
2020	Deutschland 89	Walter Schweppenstette	8 episodes

== Awards and honours ==
- Heinrich Greif Prize for The Turning Point (1984)
- Television and film award from the German Academy of Performing Arts for Romeo (2001)
- Grimme-Preis for Romeo (2002)
- Deutscher Kritikerpreis for the portrayal of Joseph Goebbels in My Führer – The Really Truest Truth about Adolf Hitler (2007)
- DEFA Foundation Prize for outstanding achievements in German film (2017)
