= Deutschland 86 =

German television series

- Genre: Cold War espionage
- Created by: Anna Winger; Joerg Winger
- Written by: Anna Winger
- Starring: Jonas Nay; Maria Schrader; Florence Kasumba; Sylvester Groth; Sonja Gerhardt; Lavinia Wilson; Ludwig Trepte; Alexander Beyer; Fritzi Haberlandt; Philipp Hochmair; Chris Veres
- Theme music composer: Peter Schilling, David Harland Lodge
- Opening theme: "Major Tom (Coming Home)"
- Countries of origin: Germany; United States
- Original languages: German; English; Portuguese
- No. of seasons: 1
- No. of episodes: 10

Production
- Producer: Tim Greve
- Cinematography: Matthias Fleischer; Kristian Leschner
- Editors: Boris Gromatzki; Jens Klüber; Robert Stuprich
- Camera setup: Multi-camera
- Running time: 45-47 minutes
- Production company: UFA Fiction

Original release
- Network: Amazon Prime (Germany); Sundance TV (US)
- Release: 19 October 2018

Related
- Deutschland 83; Deutschland 89

Deutschland 86 (German pronunciation: [ˈdɔʏtʃlant ˌzɛksʔʊntˈʔaxtsɪç]) is a 2018 German spy thriller television series starring Jonas Nay as an agent of East Germany in 1986, in relation to the Angolan Civil War.

It is a sequel to the 2015 series Deutschland 83 and precedes the 2020 series Deutschland 89.

== Cast ==
=== Main ===
- Jonas Nay as Martin Rauch, a former border patrol guard from East Germany who went undercover in 1983 in West Germany in an operation that prevented a pre-emptive nuclear strike by the Soviets against NATO but forced him to go into hiding.
- Maria Schrader as Lenora Rauch, Martin's aunt and former handler for the Stasi, now operating in Cape Town.
- Florence Kasumba as Rose Seithathi, an African National Congress (ANC) operative working with Lenora.
- Sylvester Groth as Walter Schweppenstette, Lenora's former boss at the East German Permanent Mission (StäV), and Martin's anonymous father, who has been demoted after the 1983 incident.
- Sonja Gerhardt as Annett Schneider, Martin's former fiancée who is now a junior intelligence agent in the inner circle of the East German StäV.
- Lavinia Wilson as Brigitte Winkelmann, dentist wife of the West German Trade Commissioner and a West German Intelligence Service (BND) officer.
- Ludwig Trepte as Alex Edel, a gay West German who served as Oberleutnant in the military with Martin in Deutschland 83 before being dismissed. Now works in an AIDS hospice with Tim.
- Alexander Beyer as Tobias Tischbier, Martin's former handler from the Stasi's foreign arm, the Main Directorate for Reconnaissance (HVA), who is now a member of Parliament for the Alternative Party.
- Fritzi Haberlandt as Tina Fischer, an East German doctor whose novelist brother, Thomas Posimski, defected to West Germany.
- Chris Veres as Tim, a closeted gay American G.I. who works with Alex at an AIDS hospice.

=== Recurring ===
- Vladimir Burlakov as Thomas Posimski, Annett's former lover and Tina's brother.
- Anke Engelke as Barbara Dietrich, a new financial consultant to the StäV.
- Uwe Preuss as Markus Fuchs, Walter's associate who was promoted to Walter's position at the StäV.
- Carina Wiese as Ingrid Rauch, Martin's mother
- Michaela Caspar as Mrs. Netz, the former secretary to Alex's father in the Bundeswehr, now working as an agent for the BND.
- Jonathan Pienaar as Gary Banks, a South African mercenary, hired by Lenora and Martin.
- Philipp Hochmair as Frank Winkelmann, the husband of Brigitte Winkelmann.

== Episodes ==
There are 10 episodes. In addition, a documentary entitled "Comrades and Cash" was produced to accompany the series. Narrated by Nay, it describes various business activities undertaken by the East German state to earn hard currency, including: the sale of arms by the East German state to the apartheid government of South Africa, their notional enemies; smuggling arms to both sides in the Iran-Iraq war; forced labor in prisons; appropriating antiques and safe-deposit-box contents from its citizens and selling them abroad; selling blood abroad without testing it for HIV.

No.	Title	Directed by	Written by	German airdate	US airdate	Viewers (millions)
1	"Tar Baby"	Florian Cossen	Anna Winger	19 October 2018	25 October 2018	N/A
In 1986, Lenora retrieves Martin from protective exile in Angola to assist her with an operation selling a shipment of West German weapons to the South African Army. Martin sabotages the sale to General De Graaf when he learns the weapons will be used to attack an oil refinery held by the MPLA and harm people he knows, but Martin reassures a furious Lenora he can negotiate a sale to the Angolans.
2	"Ommegang"	Florian Cossen	Joy C. Mitchell & Anna Winger	19 October 2018	26 October 2018	N/A
Lenora and Martin make arrangements to bring the weapons shipment into Angola. To pay the guide, Gary Banks, Martin sleeps with the West German Trade Commissioner's wife Brigitte Winkelmann and steals her diamond necklace. During the journey, Gary delivers Lenora and Martin into the hands of De Graaf.
3	"Dragon Rouge"	Florian Cossen	Ulf Tschauder & Anna Winger	19 October 2018	1 November 2018	N/A
Gary takes Martin, Lenora, and a hidden team of rebels into the oil refinery under the pretense of selling the weapons to Major Kalumba. Martin negotiates the sale, and once they have the payment, Gary holds Kalumba at gunpoint, planning to leave with the money, the weapons, and three tankers of diesel, after which the rebels will bomb the oil refinery. Martin escapes and finds the bomb; he is unable to defuse it in time, but it malfunctions. Gary drops the money, and the rebels all kill each other over it. Lenora and Martin flee, but Martin is shot in the chest by a sniper, and Lenora leaves him for dead.
4	"Le Cafard"	Florian Cossen	Will Bentley & Anna Winger	19 October 2018	2 November 2018	N/A
Gary has taken Martin to recover in Libya, where he is selling the weapons to a terrorist, Khaled Al Badri. Gary also hopes to sell Martin's services as the infamous operative Kolibri. Brigitte is also interested in acquiring Martin and Lenora, and Gary delivers Martin to her. Walter works his way back into the inner circle with a plan to smuggle goods to South Africa. He is about to tell Ingrid that Martin is presumed dead, but changes his mind.
5	"Green Book"	Florian Cossen	Steve Bailie & Anna Winger	19 October 2018	8 November 2018	N/A
Brigitte is a West German intelligence agent, and has Martin in a hideout in Paris. He declines her offer to be a double agent. Learning Martin may be alive, Walter sends Nina to find him. Martin recognizes Khaled's associate Samira in a photo Nina shows him, and warns Walter she is likely planning a terrorist attack. Walter gets a coded message to US intelligence, who warn their assets in the city. Samira is thwarted in her attempt to bomb the Grand Hotel Voltaire in West Berlin, and instead bombs a nightclub across the street, where Alex and Tim are dancing.
6	"Tjello"	Florian Cossen	Will Bentley & Anna Winger	19 October 2018	9 November 2018	N/A
Martin returns to West Berlin, where international intelligence believes he is involved with the bombing. Tim has been seriously injured in the explosion. Walter passes along intel to US agent Hector Valdez proving the Libyans planned the attack without Martin. Lenora blackmails the West German Trade Commissioner Frank Winkelmann into helping her with an arms deal, and brings Rose Seithathi to stay with Ingrid. Martin visits Thomas, who confirms Martin is Max's father. After meeting Thomas, Marianne agrees to help Tina and her family escape from East Germany.
7	"El Dorado Canyon"	Florian Cossen	Joy C. Mitchell & Anna Winger	19 October 2018	15 November 2018	N/A
Martin is reunited with Tobias, but Annett is not happy with his reappearance. Martin wants to be brought back into East Germany, insisting he is still loyal to the HV A and can be trusted. Barbara Dietrich assigns Lenora to Operation Dream Boat. Marianne tries to smuggle Tina and her family across the border, but, thanks to information Martin gives to Annett, they are caught and Marianne is killed.
8	"Vula"	Arne Feldhusen	Ulf Schauder & Anna Winger	19 October 2018	16 November 2018	N/A
Martin tells Brigitte he is willing to work for the BND, and she takes him to Mrs Netz, who is now also a West German intelligence agent. Martin's first test of loyalty is to help the BND abduct Lenora. Tobias reveals to Alex he is HIV-positive. Tina is questioned in a Stasi prison. Tobias, representing West Germany, meets Annett to discuss exchanging Martin for several East German prisoners; Annett agrees to exchange Tina, but not her husband or daughters. The Chernobyl nuclear disaster stirs up the whole of Europe.
9	"Chickenfeed"	Arne Feldhusen	Steve Bailie & Anna Winger	19 October 2018	16 November 2018	N/A
Tina is sent to West Germany, but is horrified to learn her family is still in the East. Martin is returned to East Germany carrying BND intel provided by Brigitte. He is reunited first with an icy Annett, and then with his mother. Frank tells Brigitte he is resigning, and that they can move back to Germany together. Martin follows Lenora, who is blackmailed by Frank as she supervises the loading of the weapons to be smuggled aboard the cruise ship. Gary reappears, intent on souring the arms sale, but Rose kills him.
10	"Total Onslaught"	Arne Feldhusen	Anna Winger	19 October 2018	17 November 2018	N/A
Mrs. Netz arranges passage to West Germany for Martin, Lenora, and Max. The threat of the HVA's smuggling operation being exposed forces Markus to bring the cruise ship back to East Germany. Lenora is benched. Brigitte tells Frank their marriage is over. Martin abducts Max to coerce Annett to collect Tina's daughters from the orphanage. He sends Lenora and the girls across to West Germany, where they are reunited with Tina and Lenora is taken by the BND. Nina assassinates Frank. Annett lets Martin become a part of Max's life.

== Broadcast ==
Deutschland 86 first aired in Germany on Amazon Prime on 19 October 2018. The series premiered in Australia on Stan on 22 October 2018, and in the United States on 25 October 2018 on SundanceTV. It aired in the UK on More4 starting on 8 March 2019 and the boxset was released on Walter Presents on All 4 directly after its transmission.

== Production ==
In August 2017, filming began in Cape Town, South Africa, with the majority of the returning cast from Deutschland 83 and five new cast members being confirmed, and concluded there in October before returning to Berlin. On 18 December 2017, both star Jonas Nay and co-creator Anna Winger confirmed on Twitter that it was the final day of filming on the series with filming wrapping four days later. New cast member Chris Veres was promoted to series regular in November 2017. On 26 July 2018, Nay revealed the German premiere date on Instagram. Two days later, the US premiere date was revealed on the show's official Facebook and Instagram accounts.

== Reception ==
100% of 12 critics' reviews are positive. The website's consensus reads: "Deutschland 86 is a rollicking spy caper that leverages its chic 1980s aesthetic to addictive effect -- proving both pleasurably suspenseful and empathetic to the point-of-view behind the Iron Curtain."
