= Anna Winger =

American novelist (born 1970)

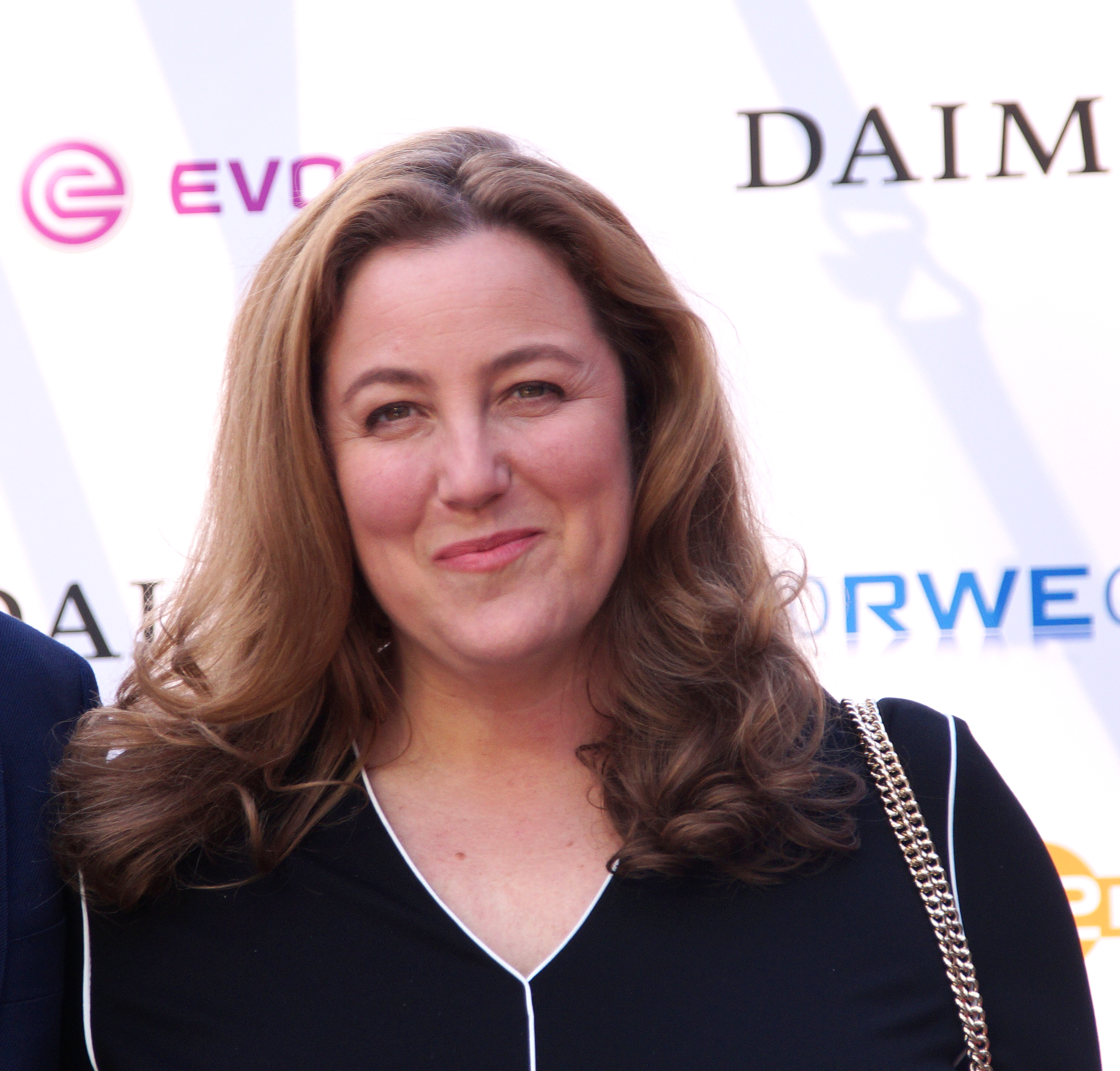
- Winger in 2016
- Born: Anna LeVine; 1970 (age 55–56); Massachusetts
- Education: Columbia University
- Occupations: Writer; Producer; Screenwriter; Photographer
- Spouse: Joerg Winger

Anna Winger (née LeVine; born 1970) is an American writer, producer, screenwriter, and photographer who lives in Berlin, Germany. She is co-creator of the television dramas Deutschland 83, Deutschland 86, Deutschland 89, and Unorthodox and the limited series Transatlantic. She is the founder of the Berlin production company, Studio Airlift.

== Early life and education ==
Winger grew up in Massachusetts. Her parents are anthropologists, and their work took their family to live in Kenya and Mexico for extended periods. She is Jewish.

She graduated from Columbia University in 1993.

== Career ==
Before she started writing, Winger worked as a professional photographer for more than a decade.

Winger's first novel, This Must Be the Place, was published in 2008 by Riverhead Books.

Her personal essays have appeared in The New York Times Magazine, Condé Nast Traveler, Frankfurter Allgemeine Zeitung, and Süddeutsche Zeitung. Winger's radio series for NPR Worldwide, Berlin Stories, ran from 2009 to 2013.

Her first project as a screenwriter was Deutschland 83, a television drama which she co-created with her husband Joerg Winger. The series aired on Sundance TV (USA) in June 2015 and on RTL (Germany) in November and December 2015. The 8-episode series, about a young East German spy on an undercover mission to West Germany in 1983, had its world premiere when the first two episodes were shown at the 2015 Berlin Film Festival. Winger wrote the series in English, but it was shot in German. It is the first German-language series to be shown on American television. It won the International Emmy for best drama series, a Peabody award and the Adolf Grimme prize in 2016.

In 2016, Winger founded her own Berlin-based production company, Studio Airlift. In 2017 she co-created and co-produced the Amazon Prime and Sundance TV miniseries Deutschland 86, which was the follow-up season to Deutschland 83. The third installment, Deutschland 89, was broadcast in 2021. She was also a consulting producer for the Epix series, Berlin Station.

Winger and Alexa Karolinski served as co-creators and co-writers of the miniseries Unorthodox, which debuted on March 26, 2020 and was Netflix's first original series in Yiddish. It was nominated for many prizes and won a best director Emmy for Maria Schrader. Unorthodox was produced by Studio Airlift, as was Winger's next series for Netflix, Transatlantic, which aired in 2023. In 2020, Winger served as a non-writing Executive Producer on Suspicion, for Apple TV. Winger was in an exclusive deal with Netflix from 2021 to 2024.

== Personal life ==
Winger met her husband in Chile. Before 2002, Winger lived in New York, and her husband Joerg Winger lived in Cologne, Germany. In 2002, they moved together to Berlin, Germany. They have two daughters.

She speaks English, Spanish, and German, but always writes in English.

== Filmography ==
Year	Title	Creator	Writer	Producer	Notes
2012-2015	Leipzig Homicide		Yes		Writer for 4 episodes of German television series
2015	Deutschland 83	Yes	Yes		Creator and writer of German-American RTL and Sundance TV miniseries
2016	Berlin Station			Yes	Consulting producer for 2 episodes of American drama series
2018	Deutschland 86	Yes	Yes		Creator and writer of second installment of German-American Amazon Prime and Sundance TV miniseries
2020	Unorthodox	Yes	Yes		Creator and writer of German-American Netflix miniseries
2020	Deutschland 89	Yes	Yes	Yes	Creator and writer of third installment of German-American Amazon Prime miniseries
2023	Transatlantic	Yes	Yes	Yes	
