= Tannbach (TV series) =

German television series

- Genre: Drama
- Directed by: Alexander Dierbach
- Starring: Heiner Lauterbach; Natalia Wörner; Henriette Confurius; Jonas Nay
- Original language: German
- No. of seasons: 2 seasons
- No. of episodes: 6 episodes

Production
- Running time: ca 90 Minutes

Original release
- Network: ZDF
- Release: 2015 – 2018

Tannbach is a German television series that first aired on ZDF in 2015. It is a fictionalized story inspired by the village of Mödlareuth and its families that were divided by the Iron Curtain along a brook known as the Tannbach. The series explores the traumatic period of German history between the end of World War II and 1968. For the people of the village, the end of the war does not mean the end of hardship, soon the Cold War takes over and the village as well as the people become divided along geographic and political lines. The series has 2 seasons and is known as "Line of Separation" in the United States. "Line of Separation" was picked up by PBS as a streaming offering.

== Main cast ==
- Heiner Lauterbach as Georg von Striesow
- Natalia Wörner as Caroline von Striesow
- Henriette Confurius as Anna von Striesow
- Nadja Uhl as Liesbeth Erler
- Jonas Nay as Friedrich Erler
- Ludwig Trepte as Lothar Erler
- Martina Gedeck as Hilde Vöckler
- David Zimmerschied as Horst Vöckler
- Alexander Held as Franz Schober
- Florian Brückner as Heinrich Schober
- Maximilian Brückner as Gustl Schober
- Johanna Bittenbinder as Kathi Schober
- Maria Dragus as Theresa Prantl
- Senta Auth as Lisa Prantl
- Inga Busch as Cilly Imhoff
- Jonathan Berlin as Walter Imhoff
- Ronald Zehrfeld as Konrad Werner
- Vladimír Lach as das Kind
