= Fritzi Haberlandt =

German actress

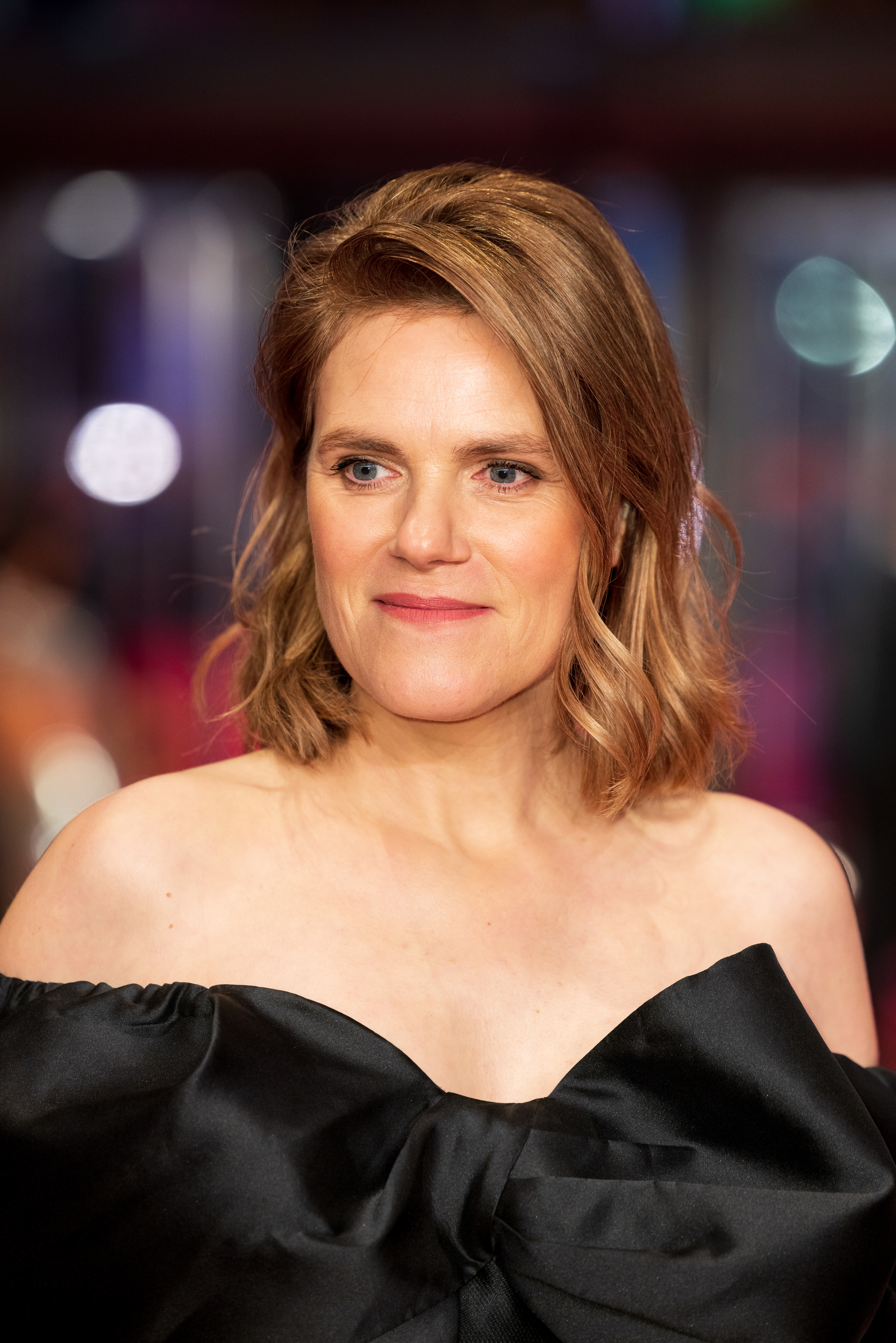
- Haberlandt in 2023
- Born: 6 June 1975 (age 51); East Berlin, East Germany
- Occupation: Actress
- Spouse: Hendrik Handloegten

Fritzi Haberlandt (born 6 June 1975) is a German actress.

== Career ==
Haberlandt studied theatre at the Ernst Busch Academy of Dramatic Arts, alongside Lars Eidinger, Nina Hoss, Devid Striesow and Mark Waschke.

Early in her career, Haberlandt played the role of Lucile Duplessis in Danton's Death, with the Berliner Ensemble, in a production directed by Robert Wilson. She has appeared in such films as Learning to Lie, The Moon and Other Lovers, Cold Is the Breath of Evening, and Summer Window.

Haberlandt is a member of the Thalia Theater in Hamburg.

== Selected filmography ==
- Cold Is the Breath of Evening (2000)
- Heimatfilm! (2002)
- Learning to Lie (2003)
- Peas at 5:30 (2004)
- Nothing but Ghosts (2007)
- Head Under Water (2007)
- An Old Maid (2007, TV movie)
- Ein starker Abgang (2008, TV movie)
- The Moon and Other Lovers (2008)
- Tatort: Tote Männer (2009, TV series episode)
- Tatort: Wie einst Lilly (2010, TV series episode)
- Summer Window (2011)
- Eine Insel namens Udo (2011)
- Night Without Morning (2011, TV movie)
- The Rhino and the Dragonfly (2012)
- Fog in August (2016)
- Tatort: Der treue Roy (2016, TV series episode)
- Babylon Berlin (2017-2020, TV series)
- Deutschland 86 (2018, TV series)
- Deutschland 89 (2020, TV series)
