= Vladimir Burlakov =

Russian–German actor (born 1987)

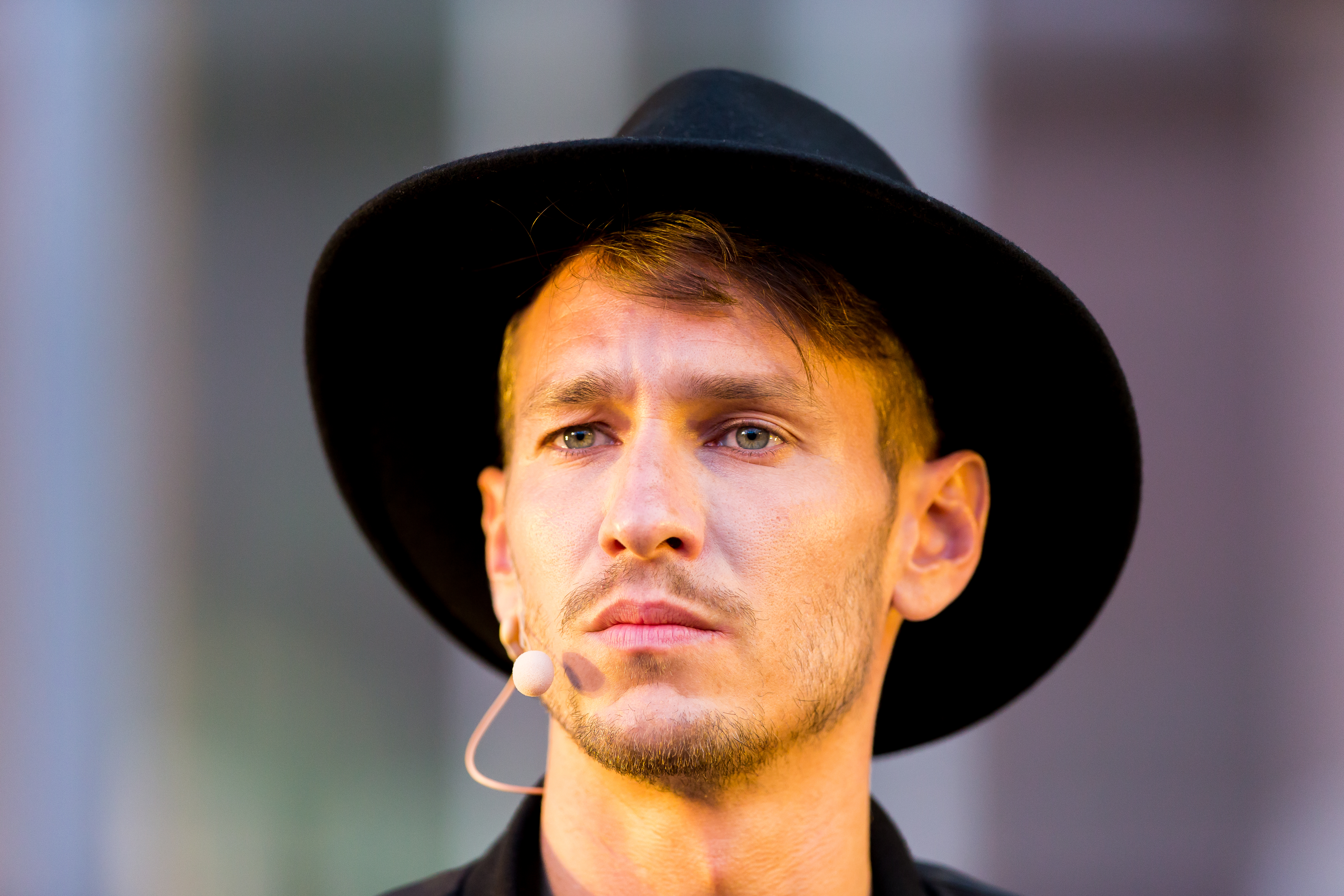
- Burlakov in 2016
- Born: 22 July 1987 (age 38); Moscow, RSFSR, USSR (now Russia)
- Citizenship: Russia; Germany
- Occupation: Actor
- Years active: 2010–present

Vladimir Burlakov (Russian: Владимир Бурлаков; born 22 July 1987) is a German actor of Russian descent, known for his portrayal of Andi Wolf in Netflix's German series Kleo (2022) and Thomas Posimski in Deutschland 83 and Deutschland 86.

== Biography ==
Burlakov was born in Moscow, Russian SFSR, Soviet Union (now Russia). In 1996, he and his family moved to Germany. From 2006 to 2010 he studied at Otto Falckenberg School of the Performing Arts.

In November 2021, he came out as gay. He has a partner.

== Filmography ==
=== Films ===
- Lost in Siberia (2012)
- Bright Night (2014)
- Iron Sky: The Coming Race (2019) as Sasha

=== Television ===
- Im Angesicht des Verbrechens (2010)
- SOKO Stuttgart (2011), single episode
- Der Kriminalist (2011)
- Der letzte Bulle (2013), single episode
- Wilsberg (2013), single episode
- Deutschland 83 (2015) as Thomas Posimski
- SOKO Köln (2015), single episode
- Deutschland 86 (2018) as Thomas Posimski
- Lore (2018), single episode (S2E3)
- Beat (2018), recurring
- Tatort, single episodes in 2016 and 2018, since 2020 main cast as Leo Hölzer
- Kleo as Andi Wolf (2022)
