= Stefan Zweig: Farewell to Europe =

2016 film

- Film poster
- Directed by: Maria Schrader
- Written by: Maria Schrader; Jan Schomburg
- Starring: Josef Hader; Barbara Sukowa
- Distributed by: X Verleih AG (through Warner Bros.) (Germany); Filmladen (Austria); ARP Sélection (France)
- Release date: 2 June 2016
- Running time: 106 minutes
- Countries: Germany; Austria; France
- Language: German
- Box office: $640,893

Stefan Zweig: Farewell to Europe (German: Vor der Morgenröte) is a 2016 internationally co-produced drama film directed and co-written by Maria Schrader. It was listed as one of eight films that could be the German submission for the Best Foreign Language Film at the 89th Academy Awards, but it was not selected. However, it was later chosen as the Austrian entry for the Best Foreign Language Film at the 89th Academy Awards, but it was not nominated.

== Cast ==
- Josef Hader as Stefan Zweig
- Aenne Schwarz as Lotte Zweig
- Barbara Sukowa as Friderike Zweig
- Tómas Lemarquis as Lefèvre
- Lenn Kudrjawizki as Samuel Malamud
- Charly Hübner as Emil Ludwig
- Nahuel Pérez Biscayart as Vitor D'Almeida
- Harvey Friedman as Friedman
- Valerie Pachner as Alix Störk
- Matthias Brandt as Ernst Feder
- Ivan Shvedoff as Halpern Leivick
- Daniel Puente Encina as Sadler
- André Szymanski as Joseph Brainin

== Reception ==
On review aggregator Rotten Tomatoes, the film holds an approval rating of 93% based on 29 reviews, with an average rating of 7/10. On Metacritic, it has a weighted average rating of 75 out of 100, based on 8 critics, indicating "generally favorable reviews".

== See also ==
- List of submissions to the 89th Academy Awards for Best Foreign Language Film
- List of Austrian submissions for the Academy Award for Best Foreign Language Film
