= Vier gegen Z =

- Also known as: 4 gegen Z
- Starring: Udo Kier; Jessica Rusch; Kevin Stevan; Carolyn McGregor; Jonas Friedebom
- Country of origin: Germany
- Original language: German
- No. of seasons: 3
- No. of episodes: 39

Production
- Running time: 25 minutes

Original release
- Network: ARD, KI.KA
- Release: 9 April 2005 – 17 November 2007

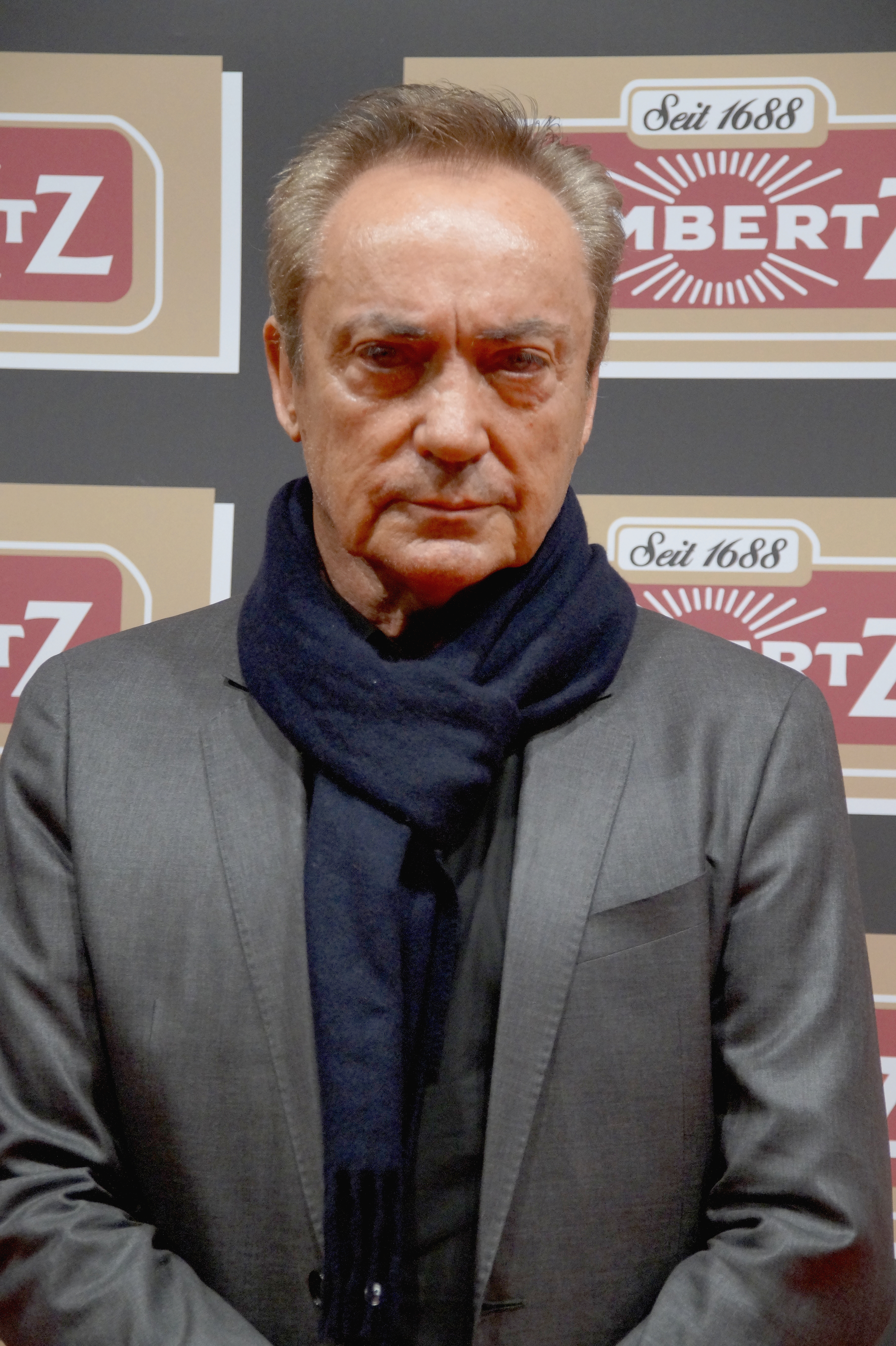
Udo Kier at Lambertz Monday Night, February 2016.

4 gegen Z (spoken Vier gegen Zet, also written as 4><Z, lit. "4 against Z") is a German children's television program shown on ARD and KI.KA in which four children are appointed as "Wächter" (guardians) by their deceased aunt Hedda to prevent Zanrelot, the "Herrscher der Finsternis" (lord of darkness) from leaving the underworld and gaining control over Lübeck. As of September 2006, two seasons of 13 episodes each have been broadcast. The show's success has sparked the creation of a total of 6 novelized versions of the television episodes.

== Cast ==
Actor	Role
Jessica Rusch	Karo
Kevin Stevan	Pinkas
Carolyn McGregor	Leonie
Jonas Friedebom	Otti
Udo Kier	Zanrelot
Andreas Pietschmann	Matreus
Lucas Gregorowicz	Jona
Eva-Maria Hagen	Tante Hedda
Siegfried Terpoorten	Sascha Sörensen
Karoline Eichhorn	Julia Lehnhoff
