= Doris Egbring-Kahn =

German actress (1926–2016)

Doris Egbring-Kahn (1926–2016) was a German actress.

She started her career in 1934 at the Städtische Oper Berlin. In Life Sucks, a 2008 film by Rudolf Steiner, Doris Egbring-Kahn plays the Grandma.
