= Jonas Nay =

German actor (born 1990)

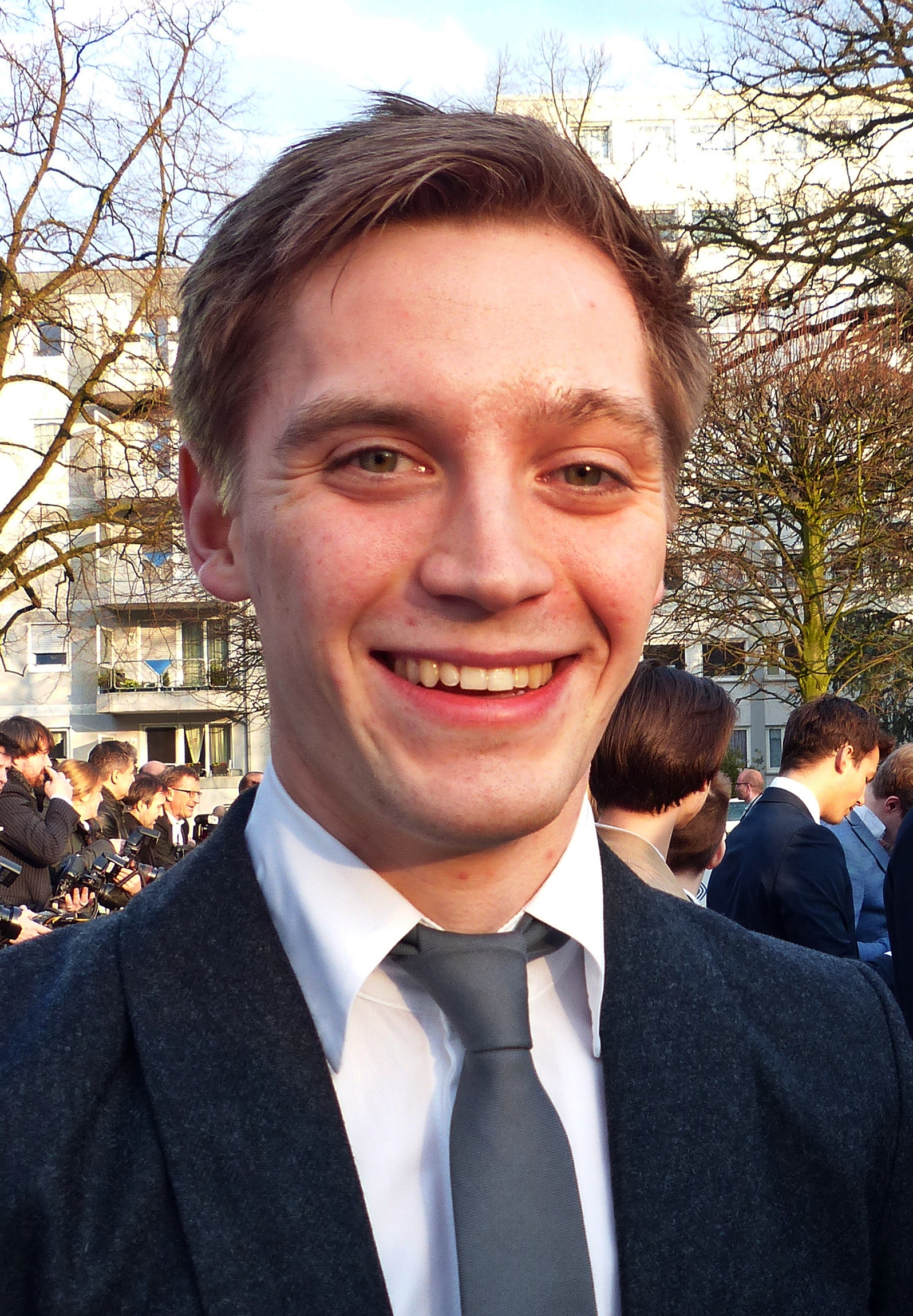
- Nay in 2016
- Born: 20 September 1990 (age 35); Lübeck, Schleswig-Holstein, West Germany
- Occupation: Actor
- Years active: 2005–present

Jonas Nay ([ˈjoːnas naɪ], born 20 September 1990) is a German actor and musician known for starring as Martin Rauch in Deutschland 83 and its sequels, Deutschland 86 and Deutschland 89.

== Early life ==
Jonas Nay was born in Lübeck in 1990, days before the reunification of Germany. An active boy, he rarely watched television growing up, preferring to spend leisure time on his interests of sport and music. He received his secondary education at the Johanneum zu Lübeck, a Gymnasium (selective school) with a music specialty, where he also played in the school's band.

== Career ==
Because of his interest in the theatre, Nay responded to a newspaper advertisement looking for actors in 2004 and successfully auditioned for a part in the German children's series Vier gegen Z on German TV station NDR. In the first two seasons of the television series, Nay portrayed character Otti Sörensen while using the stage name Jonas Friedebom. In the following years, he played minor roles in several television productions on German television stations ARD and ZDF.

After finishing school, Nay took the lead role in the TV film Homevideo, a drama about a teenage boy bullied by his classmates, who shared a video of him masturbating. The production was awarded Best TV film at the 2011 German Television Awards. Nay himself received a German Television Award, as well as a 2012 Grimme-Preis Award, for his role. This work was followed by other leading roles in TV films. In 2012, Nay had a role as Hamburg investigator Cenk Batu in Tatort: Die Ballade von Cenk und Valerie, about a disturbed serial killer who is killed by his mother in the heat of the moment. For his role as the son of a schizophrenic in the 2013 film Hirngespinster, he was awarded the Bavarian Film Award in 2013 as "Best Newcomer."

Nay opted for Zivildienst, rather than military service, working with people with disabilities; he went on to look at film scoring. He founded the band Concerted with other students at the Johanneum he had attended in his adolescence, in which he sang, played guitar and piano, and wrote the lyrics. The band worked on music for the Stephan Rick film The Good Neighbour in January 2013. The result was the forming of the new band Northern Lights.

In 2015, Nay starred as Martin Rauch, an East German spy, in the Cold War thriller Deutschland 83, the first German-language TV series shown on American television, and later its 2018 and 2020 sequels, Deutschland 86 and Deutschland 89. He reached a certain level of international recognition for this role being interviewed by multiple media outlets in the United Kingdom and United States.

Nay sings and plays the keyboard for the band Pudeldame.

In February 2021, it was announced that Nay had been cast alongside actor Elyas M'Barek in the film 1000 Zeilen (1000 Lines), a thriller based on the book Tausend Zeilen Lüge. Das System Relotius und der deutsche Journalismus by Juan Moreno about the 2018 Fake news scandal which involved former journalist Claas Relotius from Der Spiegel.

== Filmography ==
- 2005–06: Vier gegen Z (TV series)
- 2007: Die Rettungsflieger (TV series)
- 2007: Großstadtrevier (TV series)
- 2008: Die Pfefferkörner (TV series)
- 2009: krimi.de (TV series)
- 2009: Morgen ist auch noch ein Tag (short film)
- 2011: Notruf Hafenkante (TV series)
- 2011: Homevideo (TV film)
- 2011: Jorinde & Joringel (TV film)
- 2012: Tatort: Die Ballade von Cenk und Valerie (Crime Scene: The Ballad of Cenk and Valerie)
- 2012: Sechzehneichen (TV film)
- 2012: Tatort: Todesschütze
- 2013: The Woman from the Past (TV film)
- 2013: Death at the Baltic Sea (TV film)
- 2013: King Ordinary (film)
- 2013: Nichts mehr wie vorher (TV film)
- 2014: Hirngespinster (film)
- 2014: Dear Courtney (film)
- 2015: Tannbach – Schicksal eines Dorfes (TV film)
- 2015: We Are Young. We Are Strong (film)
- 2015: Unser letzter Sommer (Summer Solstice) (film)
- 2015: Deutschland 83 (TV series)
- 2016: A Minute's Silence (TV film)
- 2018: Deutschland 86 (TV series)
- 2019: The Master Butcher (TV series)
- 2020: Deutschland 89 (TV series)
- 2020: Persian Lessons (film)
- 2021: Ein Hauch von Amerika (TV series)
- 2021: The Four of Us
- 2022: A Thousand Lines (film)
- 2023: Transatlantic
- 2024: The Tattooist of Auschwitz- Stefan Baretzki
- 2025: Bookish (TV Series) - Felix (series one, episodes 5&6)
- 2026: The Widow Killer (Sternstunde der Mörder) based on a novel by Pavel Kohout

== Awards ==
- 2011: German Television Awards, Award for Homevideo
- 2012: Grimme-Preis Award for Homevideo
- 2012: New Faces Award for Homevideo
- 2012: Günter-Strack Award for Homevideo
- 2014: Bavarian Film Award in 2013 as best young actor for Hirngespinster
- 2016: German Television Awards, Best Actor Award for Deutschland 83, Tannbach
