= Lisa Tomaschewsky =

German actress (born 1988)

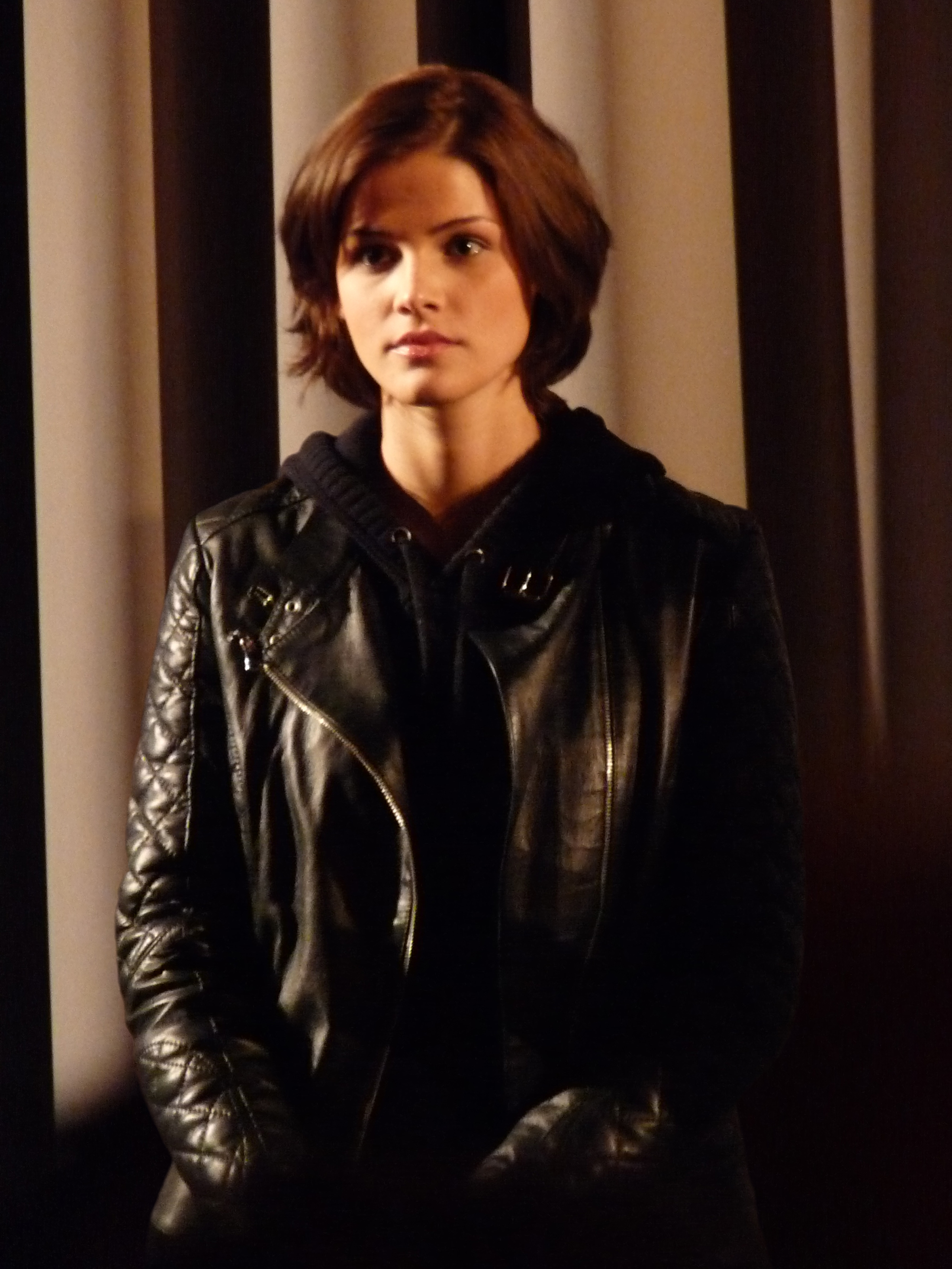
- Lisa Tomaschewsky in 2013
- Born: 22 July 1988 (age 37); Itzehoe, West Germany
- Occupation: Actress
- Years active: 2011–present

Lisa Tomaschewsky (born 22 July 1988) is a German actress and model. She was the German Playboy Playmate of the Month for February 2009.

== Filmography ==
=== Cinema Feature Films ===
Year	Title	Role	Notes
2011	Die Summe meiner einzelnen Teile	Model	
2013	Heute bin ich blond	Sophie Ritter	
2016	Seitenwechsel	Sylvie	
2016	Verrückt nach Fixi	Fixi	
2018	Hot Dog	Mascha Butkin	
2018	Klassentreffen 1.0 – Die unglaubliche Reise der Silberrücken	Laura	
2019	Gut gegen Nordwind	Clara Rothner	

=== Video-On-Demand: Feature Films ===
Year	Title	Role	Notes
2014	Audrey	Charlie	

=== Television Feature Films ===
Year	Title	Role	Notes
2012	Nur eine Nacht	Victoria	
2015	Alles Verbrecher: Leiche im Keller	Dana Lambach	
2015	Die Wallensteins: Dresdner Dämonen	Kim Tilly, Kriminalhauptkommissarin	
2016	Dresden Mord: Nachtgestalten	Kim Tilly, Kriminalhauptkommissarin	

=== Television series ===
Year	Title	Role	Notes
2011	Verbotene Liebe	Kim Wolf	Season 1, Episode 3820: In den Schuhen der Braut
2011	Verbotene Liebe	Kim Wolf	Season 1, Episode 3821: Das Fest
2011	Verbotene Liebe	Kim Wolf	Season 1, Episode 3822: Sex, Lügen und Eheversprechen
2011	Verbotene Liebe	Kim Wolf	Season 1, Episode 3823: Schatten der Liebe
2011	Verbotene Liebe	Kim Wolf	Season 1, Episode 3824: Verbrannte Träume
2011	Verbotene Liebe	Kim Wolf	Season 1, Episode 3827: Das Ende vom kleinen Glück
2011	Verbotene Liebe	Kim Wolf	Season 1, Episode 3828: Eine zweite Chance
2011	Verbotene Liebe	Kim Wolf	Season 1, Episode 3829: Neuanfang
2011	Verbotene Liebe	Kim Wolf	Season 1, Episode 3830: Einsichten
2011	Verbotene Liebe	Kim Wolf	Season 1, Episode 3831: Wie weit?
2011	Verbotene Liebe	Kim Wolf	Season 1, Episode 3832: Die Last mit der Liebe
2011	Verbotene Liebe	Kim Wolf	Season 1, Episode 3833: Der richtige Zeitpunkt
2011	Verbotene Liebe	Kim Wolf	Season 1, Episode 3834: Moment der Wahrheit
2013	Küstenwache	Marie Thum	Season 16, Episode 3: Miss Ostsee
2013	Polizeiruf 110	Nadine Grade	Season 42, Episode 2: Laufsteg in den Tod
2014	Frühling	Janina Weber	Season 3, Episode 1: Frühlingsgeflüster
2014	SOKO Leipzig	Mila	Season 15, Episode 7: Dumm gelaufen
2014	SOKO Leipzig	Mila	Season 15, Episode 9: Ausflug mit Mila
2014	SOKO Leipzig	Mila	Season 15, Episode 10: Der einzige Zeuge?
2014	SOKO 5113	Maren Reinholz	Season 40, Episode 6: Verrückt
2015	Deutschland	Yvonne Edel	Season 1: Deutschland 83, Episode 1: Quantum Jump
2015	Deutschland	Yvonne Edel	Season 1: Deutschland 83, Episode 2: Brave Guy
2015	Deutschland	Yvonne Edel	Season 1: Deutschland 83, Episode 3: Atlantic Lion
2015	Deutschland	Yvonne Edel	Season 1: Deutschland 83, Episode 4: Northern Wedding
2015	Deutschland	Yvonne Edel	Season 1: Deutschland 83, Episode 5: Cold Fire
2015	Deutschland	Yvonne Edel	Season 1: Deutschland 83, Episode 6: Brandy Station
2015	Deutschland	Yvonne Edel	Season 1: Deutschland 83, Episode 7: Bold Guard
2015	Deutschland	Yvonne Edel	Season 1: Deutschland 83, Episode 8: Able Archer
2017	Letzte Spur Berlin	Vega	Season 6, Episode 1: Verbrannt
2017	Letzte Spur Berlin	Vega	Season 6, Episode 2: Tauschgeschäft
2018	BECK is back!	Ellen Bodenbender	Season 1, Episode 8: Liebe bis zum Schluss
2018	Ein Fall für zwei	Lana Heinze	Season 38, Episode 3: Tod eines Piloten
2019	Berlin Station	Andrea Parker	Season 3, Episode 5: The Dream of the Four Policemen
2019	Walpurgisnacht	Antje	Season 1, Episode 1: Teil 1
2019	Walpurgisnacht	Antje	Season 1, Episode 2: Die Mädchen und der Tod
2023	Sweat	Melba Meinhardt	Season 1, Episode 2: Fit-Friday

=== Music Videos ===
Year	Artist	Title	Role	Notes
2016	Jacob Whitesides	Focus (Rufus Dipper Remix)	Fixi	Archival Footage from the 2016 Film Verrückt nach Fixi
2017	Robin Schulz featuring James Blunt	OK	Simona	
