= Alexander Beyer =

German actor

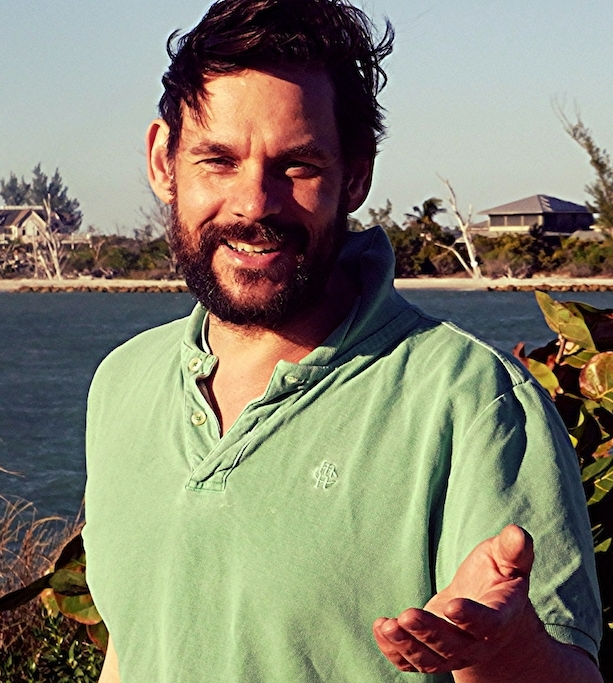
- Beyer in 2014
- Born: 24 June 1973 (age 52); Erfurt, Bezirk Erfurt, East Germany
- Occupation: Actor
- Years active: 1997–present
- Partner: Annika Blendl
- Children: 1

Alexander Beyer (born 24 June 1973) is a German actor.

== Biography ==
He was born in Erfurt, East Germany. He has appeared in such films as Volker Schloendorff's The Legend of Rita (Die Stille nach dem Schuss, 1999), Leander Haußmann's Sun Alley (Sonnenallee, 2000), Johannes Kiefer's Gregor's Greatest Invention (Gregors groesste Erfindung, 2001), which was nominated for an Academy Award for Live Action Short Film in 2002 and Wolfgang Becker's Good Bye Lenin! (2003), among others.

== Personal life ==
Beyer is in a relationship with actress Annika Blendl. The couple has one son.

He lives and works in Zurich and Berlin.

== Filmography ==
- 2025: Brick
- 2022: Dalíland directed by Mary Harron
- 2022: Operation Mincemeat directed by John Madden
- 2020: Persian Lessons directed by Vadim Perelman
- 2018: The Little Drummer Girl directed by Park Chan-wook
- 2018: Deutschland 86 directed by Florian Cossen
- 2018: Styx directed by Wolfgang Fischer
- 2016: Burg Schreckenstein directed by Ralf Huettner
- 2016: Berlin Station directed by Michaël R. Roskam
- 2015: 3 Türken und ein Baby directed by Sinan Akkuş
- 2015: Deutschland 83 directed by Edward Berger
- 2013: The Fifth Estate directed by Bill Condon
- 2012: Freshly Squeezed directed by Christine Hartmann
- 2010: A Film Unfinished directed by Yael Hersonski
- 2010: The Whore
- 2009: Summertime Blues
- 2008: Miracle at St. Anna, directed by Spike Lee
- 2007: War and Peace, as Count Pierre Bezukhov – Dir. Robert Dornhelm
- 2007: Attack on Leningrad – Dir. Aleksandr Buravsky (starring Armin Mueller-Stahl, Mira Sorvino, Gabriel Byrne)
- 2006: Mary on Water (original title: Maria am Wasser) – Dir. Thomas Wendrich (starring Annika Blendl and Hermann Beyer)
- 2005: Three Degrees Colder (original title: 3° kälter) – Dir. Florian Hoffmeister (starring Meret Becker and Bibiana Beglau)
- 2005: Tatort – Nur ein Spiel – Dir. Manuel Siebenmann (starring Miroslav Nemec, Udo Wachtveitl)
- 2005: Munich – Dir. Steven Spielberg (starring Eric Bana, Daniel Craig, Mathieu Kassovitz, Hanns Zischler, Geoffrey Rush)
- 2004: Hierankl – Dir. Hans Steinbichler (starring Barbara Sukowa, Johanna Wokalek, Josef Bierbichler)
- 2003: Good Bye Lenin! – Dir. Wolfgang Becker (starring Katrin Sass, Daniel Brühl, Chulpan Khamatova)
- 2003: Eierdiebe – Dir. Robert Schwentke (starring Julia Hummer, Wotan Wilke Möhring)
- 2003: Hamlet_X – Dir. Herbert Fritsch (starring Christoph Schlingensief, Meret Becker und Milan Peschel)
- 2002: Half the Rent – Dir. Marc Ottiker (starring Stephan Kampwirth)
- 2002: Sophiiiie! – Dir. Michael Hofmann (starring Katharina Schüttler)
- 2002: Tatort – Schlaraffenland – Dir. Nina Grosse (starring Eva Mattes, Michael Gwisdek)
- 2001: Gregor's Greatest Invention – Dir. Johannes Kiefer (Academy Award Oscar Nominee 2002, starring Helga Göring, Doris Egbring-Kahn and Christel Peters)
- 2001: Heinrich der Säger – Dir. Klaus Gietinger (starring Rolf Becker, Meret Becker and Karina Krawczyk)
- 2001: Die Hunde sind schuld – Dir. Andreas Prochaska (starring Barbara Valentin)
- 2001: Das Monstrum – Dir. Miriam Pfeiffer (starring Corinna Harfouch)
- 2000: The Legend of Rita (original title: Die Stille nach dem Schuss) – Dir. Volker Schlöndorff (starring Bibiana Beglau, Martin Wuttke and Nadja Uhl)
- 2000: Liebesau – Die andere Heimat – Dir. Wolfgang Panzer (starring Katharina Thalbach, Anna Thalbach)
- 1999: Sonnenallee – Dir. Leander Haußmann (starring Alexander Scheer, Katharina Thalbach, Robert Stadlober, Detlev Buck)
- 1999: To the Horizon and Beyond (original title: Bis zum Horizont und weiter) – Dir. Peter Kahane (starring Corinna Harfouch)
- 1998: The Big Mambo (original title: Das Mambospiel) – Dir. Michael Gwisdek (starring Jürgen Vogel und Corinna Harfouch)
- 1997: Der Hauptmann von Köpenick – Dir. Frank Beyer (starring Harald Juhnke, Rolf Hoppe, Udo Samel, Sophie Rois)
