= UFA Fiction =

- Type: Subsidiary
- Industry: Television
- Predecessors: teamWorx; Phoenix Film; UFA Fernsehproduktion
- Founded: August 2013; 12 years ago in Potsdam-Babelsberg, Germany
- Headquarters: Potsdam-Babelsberg, Germany
- Products: Television programs; Feature films
- Parent: UFA
- Website: www.ufa-fiction.de

UFA Fiction is a company founded in August 2013 for fiction film and television productions of the UFA based in Potsdam-Babelsberg. The company was created through the merger of the UFA subsidiaries teamWorx, Phoenix Film and UFA Fernsehproduktion in the context of a restructuring of UFA and the strategic goal to bundle all companies under one brand in the future.

With UFA Fiction, all production activities of the UFA in the branch of series, TV movies, events and feature films are bundled in one company. Managing directors of UFA Fiction are Benjamin Benedict, Joachim Kosack, Markus Brunnemann, Sebastian Werninger, and Joerg Winger.

UFA Fiction is owned by Fremantle, part of the RTL Group.
