= Aghet – Ein Völkermord =

2010 German documentary film

- Written by: Eric Friedler
- Directed by: Eric Friedler
- Music by: Michael Klaukien; Andreas Lonardoni
- Country of origin: Germany
- Original language: German

Production
- Producer: Katharina M. Trebitsch
- Running time: 90 minutes

Original release
- Release: 9 April 2010

Aghet – Ein Völkermord (English: Aghet – A Genocide; Aghet being Armenian for "catastrophe") is a 2010 German documentary film on the Armenian genocide by the Young Turk government of the Ottoman Empire during World War I. It is based on eyewitness reports by European and American personnel stationed in the Near East at the time, Armenian survivors and other contemporary witnesses which are recited by modern German actors. The visual material partly consists of secretly shot photographs of the death marches, Turkish atrocities and suffering of the Armenian deportees.

Aghet – Ein Völkermord was awarded the 2010 Deutscher Fernsehpreis and the 2011 Grimme Award, two of the most prestigious awards of German television. According to its director, German journalist Eric Friedler, the documentary was presented to many members of the US Congress and US Senate who have expressed astonishment on how well documented the genocide actually is. An official presentation at Capitol Hill took place in July 2010.

Aghet won the 2010 Armin T. Wegner Humanitarian Award in Los Angeles and received international recognition on the Montreal World Film Festival the same year. It was set to be shown before large audiences at Harvard and Columbia University. The documentary has been praised for introducing "Aghet", the Armenian term for the Turkish massacres, to an international audience.

The advocacy group of the Turkish community in Germany has protested against the film.

== Awards ==
- 2010 - Deutscher Fernsehpreis (Best German documentary)
- 2010 - Armin T. Wegner Humanitarian Award
- 2011 - Grimme Award
- 2011 - World Gold Medal New York Film Festival (Best documentary)

== See also ==
- Armenian genocide in culture
