= Joerg Winger =

German television producer

Joerg Winger (born 1969 in Cologne) is an Executive Producer and Managing Director at Big Window Productions and a co-creator of the television drama Deutschland 83.

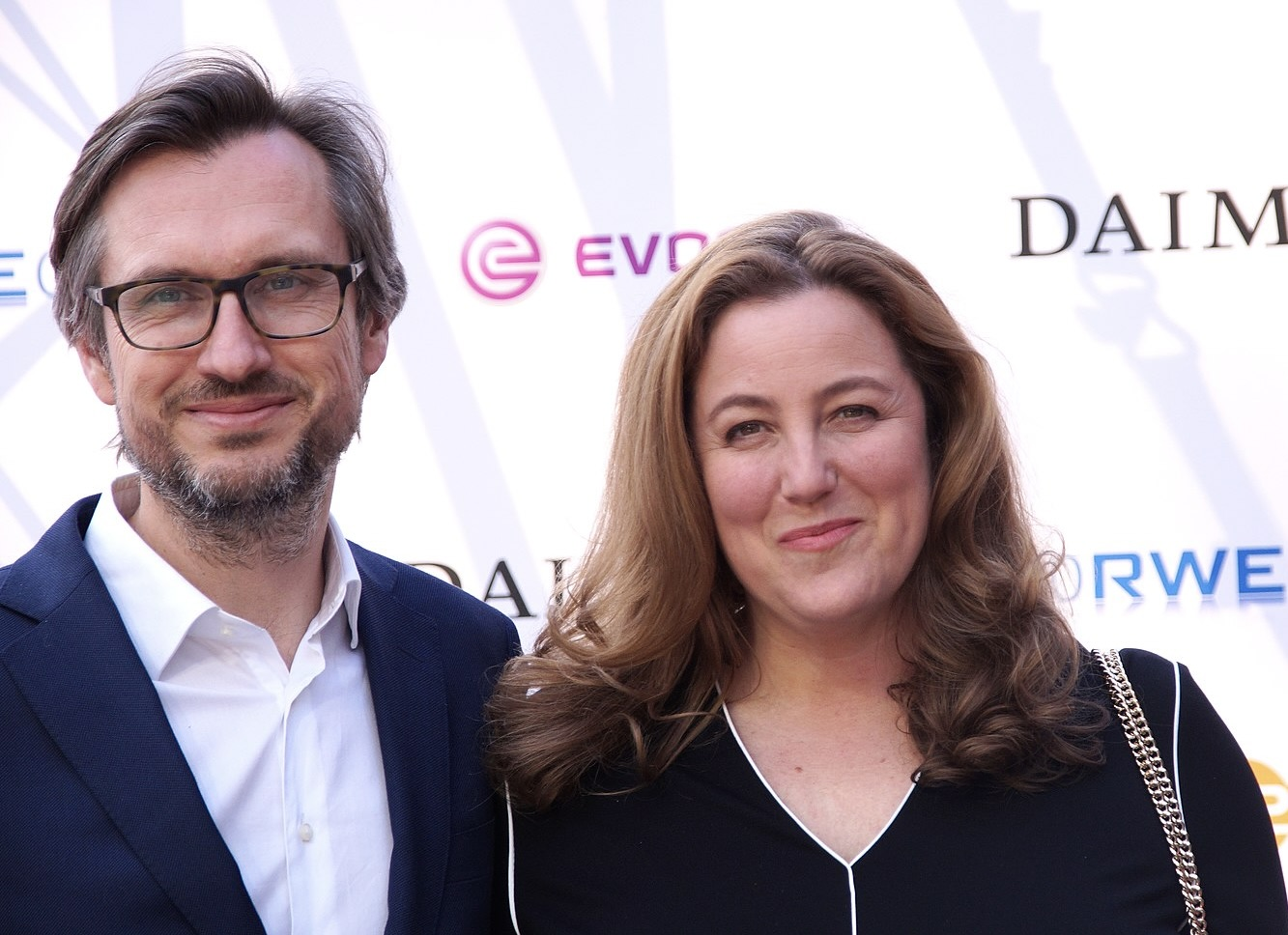
Jörg Winger with Anna Winger

== Early life and education ==
Winger was born in Cologne. He studied Russian and was trained to listen to intercepted Russian radio broadcasts during his military service in West Germany. Winger worked as a journalist and studied economics at the University of Cologne. In 1990 he met his wife Anna Winger in Chile.

== Career ==
In the early 2000s Winger moved from Cologne to Leipzig to be the showrunner of Leipzig Homicide Winger has since produced more than 300 episodes of multi-award-nominated prime-time series Leipzig Homicide on ZDF, including 14 feature-length episodes set in locations such as Moscow, Istanbul and Santo Domingo and a crossover episode with UK series The Bill on ITV.

In 2012, Winger created a YouTube channel "Trigger", where he co-created the animated series Serial Killers with Marie Meimberg. Serial Killers was sold to German TV network RTL Crime.

With his wife, Anna Winger, is co-creator and executive producer of Deutschland 83, broadcast on Sundance TV (USA) in June 2015 and on RTL (Germany) in November and December 2015. The 8-episode series, is about a young East German spy on an undercover mission to West Germany in 1983 and was inspired by Winger's military service experiences. Deutschland 83 had its world premiere when the first two episodes were shown at the 2015 Berlin Film Festival and has gone on to win a number of awards including: The Grimmepreis, Goldene Kamera, Peabody Award, and an International Emmy.

Winger is co-creator and executive producer of Hackerville, a six-part German-Romanian cybercrime drama for HBO Europe and TNT which was awarded the Grimmepreis in 2019.

Winger regularly gives lectures on the development and production of television series at Filmakademie Baden-Wuerttemberg in Ludwigsburg.

== Filmography (Producer) ==
- 2007-2008: Ein Fall für Nadja
- 2008: The Bill
- 2011: World Express-Atemlos durch Mexiko
- 2013: SOKO: Der Prozess
- 2015: Deutschland 83
- 2002–2018: Leipzig Homicide
- 2018: Hackerville
- 2018: Deutschland 86
- 2020: Deutschland 89
