= Claudia Garde =

German film director and screenwriter (born 1966)

- Born: Bremen, West Germany
- Occupations: Film director, screenwriter
- Years active: 1998–present
- Awards: Grimme-Preis-Nominations; VFF TV-Movie Award
- Website: claudiagarde.com/vita.html (in German)

Claudia Garde is a German film director and screenwriter. She has worked for the German TV-series Stubbe – Von Fall zu Fall, Doktor Martin, Flemming and the series Tatort.

== Early life and education ==
Claudia Garde was born in Bremen, West Germany.

She studied at acting schools in London and Paris after graduating from high school.

From 1992 to 1993 Garde worked in France as a theatre actress at various theatres before returning to Germany to study writing and directing at the Film Academy Baden-Wuerttemberg. She acquired her diploma in directing in 1998 with the feature film Die Man Liebt....

== Career ==
In the year 2000 she began her career as a director and screenwriter with several television films. and TV series. So she worked on episodes of series such as Stubbe – Von Fall zu Fall, Doktor Martin, and the series Flemming.

She has also directed several episodes of the Tatort series, where shas worked with actors like Axel Milberg, Klaus J. Behrendt, and Simone Thomalla.

She directed the TV movie Die Frau am Ende der Straße (2007), with Maren Eggert and Matthias Brandt in the leading roles.

In 2021 and 2022 she directed the six-part political thriller TV series set in post-war Germany, Bonn – Alte Freunde, neue Feinde, starring Mercedes Müller in the lead role, along with Max Riemelt, Sebastian Blomberg, Martin Wuttke, and a number of other well-known German actors. The series was broadcast on Das Erste in January 2023.

== Other activities ==
In addition to her work as a director for film and television, Garde has also worked as a freelance writer and lecturer.

She has collaborated with British composer Colin Towns.

== Awards and nominations ==
- The Tatort episode "Kindstod" was awarded the Golden Gong and received two German TV Awards.
- 2006: VFF TV-Movie Award for the TV-Movie Die Frau am Ende der Straße
- 2006: Grimme-Preis-Nomination for Die Frau am Ende der Straße
- 2010: Grimme-Preis-Nomination in the category Fiction for Flemming with Gregor Edelmann

== Selected filmography ==
- 1998: ...die man liebt...
- 2000: Ich beiß zurück (TV film)
- 2001: Paulas Schuld (TV film)
- 2001: Tatort: Kindstod (TV series episode)
- 2002: Mehr als nur Sex (TV film)
- 2003: Ehespiele (TV film)
- 2003: Stubbe – Von Fall zu Fall: Yesterday (TV series episode)
- 2004: Tatort: Stirb und werde (TV series episode)
- 2005: Tatort: Borowski in der Unterwelt (TV series episode)
- 2006: Die Frau am Ende der Straße (TV film)
- 2006: Tatort: Schattenspiele (TV series episode)
- 2007: Auf dem Vulkan (TV film)
- 2007: Tatort: Investigativ (TV series episode)
- 2008: Tatort: Borowski und das Mädchen im Moor (TV series episode)
- 2009: Ein Sommer mit Paul (TV film)
- 2009: Doktor Martin (TV series, 6 episodes)
- 2009: Flemming (TV series, 3 episodes)
- 2010: Tatort: Borowski und der vierte Mann (TV series episode)
- 2012: Bankraub für Anfänger (TV film)
- 2012: Tatort: Dinge, die noch zu tun sind (TV series episode)
- 2014: Tatort: Frühstück für immer (TV series episode)
- 2014: Das Glück der Anderen (TV film)
- 2015: Tatort: Niedere Instinkte (TV series episode)
- 2015: Tatort: Borowski und die Rückkehr des stillen Gastes (TV series episode)
- 2017: Eine gute Mutter (TV film)
- 2017: Das Nebelhaus (TV film)
- 2019: Verliebt in Valerie (TV film)
- 2019: Ottilie von Faber-Castell – Eine mutige Frau (TV film)
- 2023: Bonn – Alte Freunde, neue Feinde (TV miniseries)
