= List of Luxembourgish films of 2014 =

The Luxembourgish film industry produced over ten feature films in 2014. This article fully lists all non-pornographic films, including short films, that had a release date in that year and which were at least partly made by Luxembourg. It does not include films first released in previous years that had release dates in 2014.
Also included is an overview of the major events in Luxembourgish film, including film festivals and awards ceremonies, as well as lists of those films that have been particularly well received, both critically and financially.

== Major releases ==
Opening		Title	Cast and Crew	Studio	Genre(s)	Ref.
J A N U A R Y	15	Divin Enfant	Director: Olivier Doran; Cast: Émilie Dequenne, Sami Bouajila, Géraldine Pailhas	UGC Distribution	Comedy	
F E B R U A R Y	11	Fever	Director: Elfi Mikesch; Cast: Eva Mattes, Martin Wuttke		Drama	
A P R I L	16	Le Dernier Diamant	Director: Éric Barbier; Cast: Bérénice Bejo, Yvan Attal, Annie Cordy, Jean-François Stévenin, JoeyStarr		Drama	
M A Y	16	Amour Fou	Director: Jessica Hausner; Cast: Birte Schnöink, Christian Friedel, Stephan Grossmann	Coproduction Office	Comedy; Drama	
S E P T E M B E R	6	Song of the Sea	Director: Tomm Moore; Cast: David Rawle, Brendan Gleeson, Fionnula Flanagan, Lisa Hannigan, Lucy O'Connell, Jon Kenny, Pat Shortt, Colm Ó Snodaigh, Liam Hourican, Kevin Swierszcz	StudioCanal	Animation; Fantasy	
O C T O B E R	22	American Heist	Director: Sarik Andreasyan; Cast: Hayden Christensen, Adrien Brody, Jordana Brewster, Tory Kittles, Akon	Saban Films	Action	
N O V E M B E R	11	The Clearstream Affair	Director: Vincent Garenq; Cast: Gilles Lellouche, Charles Berling, Laurent Capelluto, Florence Loiret-Caille	Mars Distribution	Thriller	

== Minor Releases ==
Title	Director	Release date	Genre
Alehouse Rock	Yann Tonnar	23 February 2014 (Luxembourg)	Documentary
Belle comme la femme d'un autre	Catherine Castel	29 January 2014 (France)	Comedy
Black Harvest	Sean Clark	19 September 2014 (Luxembourg)	Documentary
Disparue en hiver	Christophe Lamotte	21 January 2015 (France)	Drama
Extending the Play	John Dahlgren	12 July 2014 (USA)	Documentary
Following the Golden Arrow	Benjamin Atkinson	6 June 2014 (USA)	Documentary
Heemwéi	Sacha Bachim	29 January 2014 (Luxembourg)	Drama
Landscapes with a Corpse	Chad Fahs	15 November 2014 (USA)	Documentary
Le goût des myrtilles	Thomas De Thier	8 October 2014 (Belgium)	Drama
Melody	Bernard Bellefroid	6 May 2015 (France)	Drama
Oro Libre	Gaelle Tavernier	24 June 2014 (Luxembourg)	Documentary
Standby	Rob Burke	14 November 2014 (UK)	Comedy
Succès Fox	Désirée Nosbusch	12 March 2014 (Luxembourg)	Documentary
Taking the Dog for a Walk	Antoine Prum		Documentary
The Golden Horse	Reinis Kalnaellis	August 2014 (Latvia)	Animation
The Hobbit: The Swedolation of Smaug	Carole Winchester	29 November 2014 (Luxembourg)	Adventure
The Prince and the 108 Demons	Pascal Morelli	21 January 2015 (France)	Animation

== See also ==
- 2014 in film
- 2014 in Luxembourg
- Cinema of Luxembourg
- List of Luxembourgish submissions for the Academy Award for Best Foreign Language Film
