= Dietmar Dath =

German author, journalist and translator (born 1970)

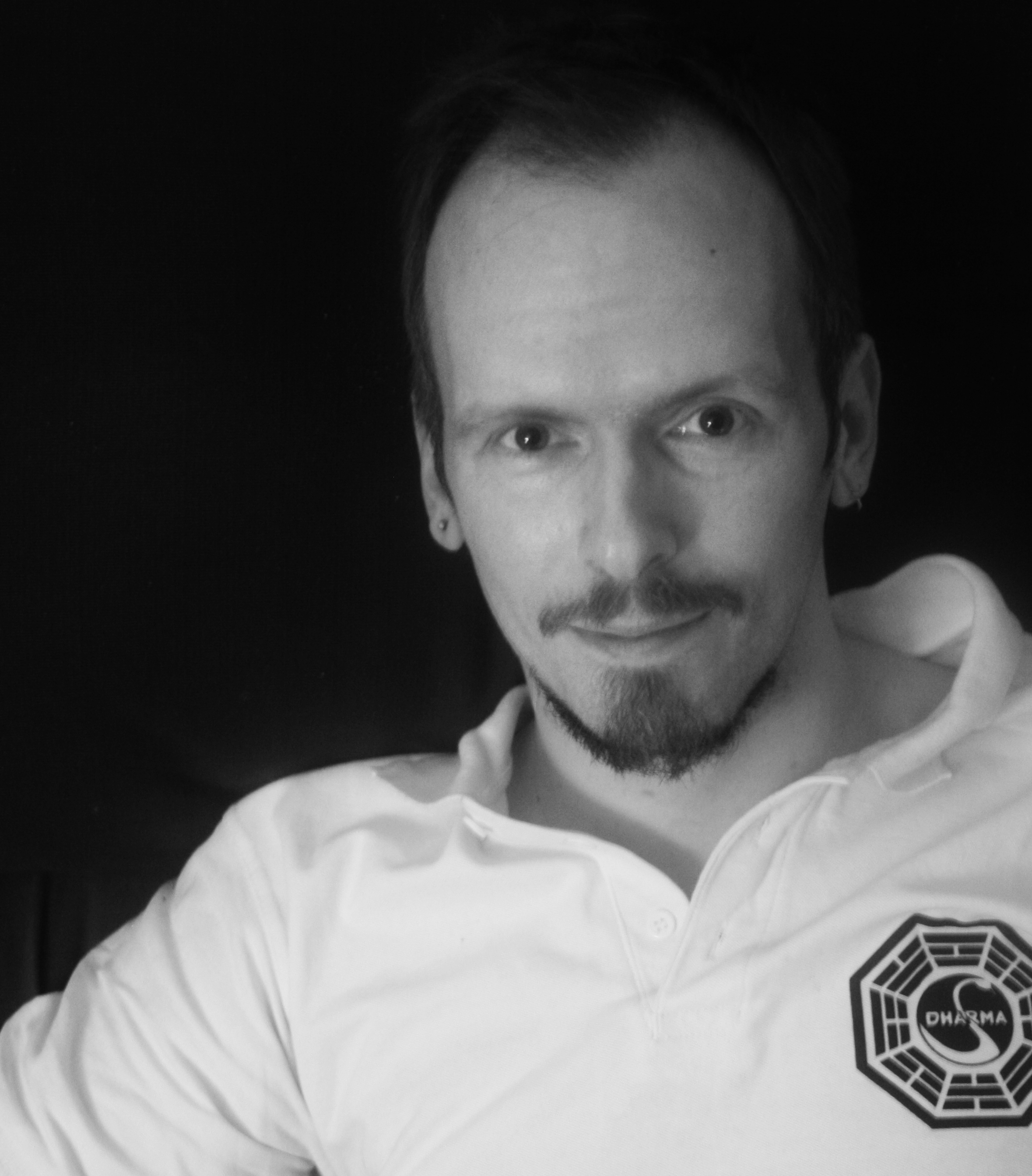
- Dath in 2010
- Born: 3 April 1970 (age 56); Rheinfelden, West Germany
- Occupations: Author, journalist and translator

Dietmar Dath (born 3 April 1970) is a German author, journalist and translator.

== Life ==
Born in Rheinfelden, Dath grew up in Schopfheim, West Germany, and finished high school in Freiburg. After civilian service he studied German studies and physics in Freiburg. He lives in Freiburg, Frankfurt and Leipzig.

Since 1990 he has published articles and short stories in German and international newspapers and magazines on sociological, philosophical and cultural topics. Besides his real name, he has been known to use pseudonyms such as "David Dalek", "Dagmar Dath" or "Dieter Draht". In his early career he translated works by Joe Lansdale, Kodwo Eshun and Buddy Giovinazzo into German. Dath was chief editor of the magazine Spex from 1998 to 2000. From 2001 to 2007 he was an editor for the Arts section at the Frankfurter Allgemeine Zeitung. Apart from writing novels and book-length essays, since 2009 he has worked on several projects with musicians such as Kammerflimmer Kollektief, Mouse on Mars and Jens Friebe. After a professional break during which he wrote novels, two plays and some poetry, in September 2011 he returned as a full-time Arts section editor and film critic to the Frankfurter Allgemeine Zeitung.

=== Literary works ===
Dath's first books were published in the mid-1990s by small publishers such as Verbrecher Verlag, SuKuLTuR, Edition Phantasi and later Hablizel. In 2003 Dath published Höhenrausch for the Eichborn-Verlag (now part of Rowohlt) and since 2005 he has been working for Suhrkamp Verlag. In 2008 his science fiction novel Abschaffung der Arten (translated by Samuel P. Willcocks into English as Abolition of the Species) was shortlisted for the German Book Prize. The novel won the 2009 Kurd Laßwitz Award. In 2013 he received the Kurd Laßwitz Award a second time for his novel Pulsarnacht. Translations of Dietmar Dath's works (mainly novels) have appeared in Russian, Greek, Korean, Polish, and English.

In his novels, which are mostly in the vein of fantastic literature – horror, sf and fantasy – Dath often works with autobiographical topics. A lot of them feature people who live in small towns such as the one he came from, many characters also work in the media or other sectors of the culture industry. Dath's works deal with aesthetics as well as social, political, sexual, biological and gender issues in often science-fictional ways. Among his influences are writers as diverse as Harlan Ellison, Joanna Russ, Nicola Griffith, Carol Emshwiller, Theodore Sturgeon, Irmtraud Morgner and Peter Hacks. His book Niegeschichte reflects for nearly 1000 pages about the genre of science fiction as a machine of art that can also change thinking. It was published in 2019 by Matthes & Seitz Berlin.

In 2026, Dath was awarded the Alfred-Kerr-Preis for literary criticism.

=== Political stance ===
Dath is a Marxist. In the film documentary by Alexander Kluge about Karl Marx's Capital Dath is featured as an expert. In January 2009 he discussed the future of a Marxist outlook on society with Philipp Oehmke in Der Spiegel – and answered to the question whether he is in favor of abolishing capitalism entirely with "Yes, absolutely," and said of his preferred replacement system "Marx calls this socialism".

Dath promotes a system of democratic production, maintaining division of labour, on the highest attainable technological level. He updates Lenin, Marx and others which also enters into his literary oeuvre – Für immer in Honig (Forever in honey), for example, refers explicitly to Lenin's "What is to be done". His most recent political essay is "Maschinenwinter" (machine winter), many explicit references to political matters can be found in the semibiographical interview conducted in 2011 by Martin Hatzius and published in book form as Alles fragen, nichts fürchten (ask all, fear nothing).

== Work ==
=== Books, novels, stories ===
- Cordula killt Dich! oder Wir sind doch nicht Nemesis von jedem Pfeifenheini. Roman der Auferstehung. Berlin: Verbrecher Verlag 1995
- Die Ehre des Rudels. Horrornovelle. Berlin: Maas Verlag 1996
- Charonia Tritonis. Ein Konzert, Dumme bitte wegbleiben. Erzählung. Berlin: SuKuLTuR Verlag 1997 (= „Schöner Lesen“ Nr. 3)
- Der Minkowski-Baumfrosch. Fortsetzungsroman in 12 Kapiteln ("Continuation novel in 12 chapters"). Berlin: De-Bug 2000.
- Skye Boat Song. Novel. Berlin: Verbrecher Verlag 2000
- Am blinden Ufer. Eine Geschichte vom Strand und aus den Schnitten. Novel. Berlin: Verbrecher Verlag 2000
- Phonon oder Staat ohne Namen. Novel. Berlin: Edition Pfadintegral im Verbrecher Verlag 2001. Neuauflage: 2004
- Schwester Mitternacht. Novel (mit Barbara Kirchner). Berlin: Verbrecher Verlag 2002
- Ein Preis. Halbvergessene Geschichte aus der Wahrheit. Berlin: SuKuLTuR Verlag 2003 (= „Schöner Lesen“ Nr. 18)
- Für immer in Honig. Novel. Berlin: Implex Verlag 2005. Neuauflage: Berlin: Verbrecher Verlag 2008
- Dirac. Novel. Frankfurt/Main: Suhrkamp Verlag 2006
- Waffenwetter. Novel. Frankfurt/Main: Suhrkamp Verlag 2007
- Das versteckte Sternbild. Novel (als David Dalek). Berlin: Shayol Verlag 2007
- Die Abschaffung der Arten. Novel. Frankfurt/Main: Suhrkamp Verlag 2008. Published in an English translation by Samuel P. Willcocks as The abolition of species, London: Seagull Books, 2013 ISBN 978-0-85742-032-9
- Sie schläft. FilmNovel Edition Phantasia: Bellheim 2009
- Sämmtliche Gedichte. Novel. Frankfurt/Main: Suhrkamp Verlag 2009
- Deutschland macht dicht. Novel. Berlin: Suhrkamp Verlag: 2010 ISBN 978-3-518-42163-5
- Eisenmäuse. Ein verschlüsselter Sittenspiegel. Lohmar: Hablizel 2010
- Kleine Polizei im Schnee. Stories. Verbrecher Verlag: Berlin 2012
- Pulsarnacht. Novel. Heyne: München 2012
- Feldeváye: Roman der letzten Künste. Novel. Suhrkamp Verlag: Berlin 2014
- Venus siegt. Novel. Hablizel Verlag: Lohmar 2015 ISBN 978-3-941978-18-8
- Deutsche Demokratische Rechnung.Eine Liebeserzählung. Novel. Eulenspiegel Verlag: Berlin 2015
- Leider bin ich tot. Novel. Suhrkamp Verlag: Berlin 2016, ISBN 978-3-518-46654-4.
- Der Schnitt durch die Sonne. Novel. S. Fischer Verlag, Frankfurt am Main 2017, ISBN 978-3-10-397306-8.
- Du bist mir gleich. Novel. Golden Press, Bremen 2019, ISBN 978-3-9819880-6-2.
- Neptunation. Novel. Fischer Tor, Frankfurt 2019, ISBN 978-3-596-70223-7.

=== Plays ===
- Waffenwetter. UA 17. April 2009, Nationaltheater Mannheim
- Die Abschaffung der Arten. UA 8. November 2009, Deutsches Theater Berlin
- Maschinenwinter. UA 2009, Centraltheater Leipzig Regie: Martin Laberenz
- Annika. Spiel für fünf Menschen, UA Februar 2011, Schauspiel Frankfurt, Frankfurter Positionen 2011
- Sie schläft. UA 12. März 2011, Zimmertheater Tübingen
- Regina Oder Die Eichhörnchenküsse, UA 22. September 2011, Nationaltheater Mannheim
- Farbenblinde Arbeit, UA 17. Dezember 2014, Nationaltheater Mannheim
- Ein Volksfeind, Bearbeitung nach Henrik Ibsen UA 10. September 2015, Schauspielhaus Zürich
- Die nötige Folter, UA 2019, Staatstheater Augsburg
- Frankenstein, UA 10. Januar 2019, Schauspielhaus Zürich

=== Essays, non-fiction and others ===
- Schöner rechnen. Die Zukunft der Computer. Berlin: Berliner Taschenbuch Verlag 2002
- Höhenrausch. Die Mathematik des XX. Jahrhunderts in zwanzig Gehirnen. Frankfurt/Main: Eichborn Verlag (Die andere Bibliothek) 2003
- Sie ist wach. Über ein Mädchen das hilft, schützt und rettet. Berlin: Implex Verlag 2003 (Über die Fernsehserie Buffy – Im Bann der Dämonen)
- Die salzweißen Augen. Vierzehn Briefe über Drastik und Deutlichkeit. Frankfurt/Main: Suhrkamp Verlag 2005
- Heute keine Konferenz. Texte für die Zeitung. Frankfurt/Main: Suhrkamp Verlag 2007 (edition suhrkamp)
- The Shramps. Mit Daniela Burger. Berlin: Implex Verlag / Verbrecher Verlag 2007
- Maschinenwinter. Wissen, Technik, Sozialismus. Eine Streitschrift. Frankfurt/Main: Suhrkamp Verlag 2008 (edition unsold)
- Rosa Luxemburg, Suhrkamp Verlag, Frankfurt am Main 2010 ISBN 978-3-518-18235-2
- Alles fragen, nichts fürchten. Mit Martin Hatzius. Berlin: Das neue Berlin 2011.
- Mädchenschönschriftaufgabe. Aus der Reihe: Documenta 13: 100 Notizen – 100 Gedanken Nr. 036. Ostfildern: Hatje Cantz Verlag 2011.
- Lost. Diaphanes, Zürich 2012, ISBN 978-3-03734-233-6.
- mit Heike Aumüller: Verbotene Verbesserungen. Starfruit Publ., Nürnberg 2012, ISBN 978-3-922895-23-7.
- Lichtmächte. Diaphanes, Zürich 2013, ISBN 978-3-03734-235-0.
- Klassenkampf im Dunkeln: Zehn zeitgemäße sozialistische Übungen. Konkret Texte 65. Konkret Verlag KVV, Hamburg 2014, ISBN 978-3-930786-74-9.
- Superhelden. Reclam, Leipzig 2016, ISBN 978-3-15-020420-7.
- Karl Marx. Reclam, Leipzig 2018, ISBN 978-3-15-020454-2.
- Das Menschen Mögliche. Zur Aktualität von Günther Anders. Wien 2018, ISBN 978-3-7117-5370-0.
- Niegeschichte. Science Fiction als Kunst- und Denkmaschine. Berlin 2019, ISBN 978-3-95757-785-6.
- Hegel. 100 Seiten. Reclam, Leipzig 2020, ISBN 978-3-15-020559-4.
- Stehsatz: Eine Schreiblehre. Wallstein, Göttingen 2020, ISBN 978-3-8353-3801-2.

=== Poetry ===
- Gott ruft zurück. Gedichte. Leipzig: Connewitzer Verlagsbuchhandlung 2011

=== Audio ===
- Im erwachten Garten. With Kammerflimmer Kollektief. Staubgold 2009
- Die Abschaffung der Arten. With Mouse On Mars. Intermedium 2011
- Die Abschaffung der Arten. Shortcut. Short Version (101'12) of the Eleven-hour-long Adaptation for Radio. With Katja Bürkle (Späth), Anna Schudt (Alexandra), Paul Herwig (Feuer), Katharina Marie Schubert (Padma), Wiebke Puls, Sylvester Groth, Rainer Bock, Brigitte Hobmeier (Philomena), Julia Jentsch, Tobias Lelle, Oliver Nägele, Felix Klare, Wolfgang Pregler, Nina Kunzendorf, Tabea Bettin, Karin Anselm, Stephan Bissmeier, Michael Tregor, Steven Scharf, Philipp Moog, Mogens von Gadow, Aglaia Szyszkowitz, Hildegard Schmahl, Stefan Hunstein, Lisa Wagner, Oliver Mallison, Saskia Mallison, Julia Loibl. Komposition: Mouse On Mars. Director: Ulrich Lampen. BR Hörspiel und Medienkunst 2011/2012.
- Ovale Fenster. Radio Drama by Dietmar Dath, Thomas Weber und Volker Zander. Kammerflimmer Kollektief. SWR ars acustica 2012.
- Larissa oder Sprich diesen Tod nicht aus. Radio Drama by Dietmar Dath & Thomas Weber. Director: Iris Drögekamp. Composition: Kammerflimmer Kollektief. SWR ars acustica 2013.
- Antilopenverlobung. By Dietmar Dath und Mareike Maage. With Cathlen Gawlich, Eva Verena Müller, Marc Hosemann, Andreas Grothgar, Frank Genser, Edda Fischer, Sigrid Burkholder, Jörg Hartmann and Stephanie Eidt. Director: Leonhard Koppelmann. BR Hörspiel und Medienkunst 2013. Podcast/Download via BR Hörspiel Pool.
- Silber gegen Ende. with The Schwarzenbach. Radio Drama by Heike Aumüller, Dietmar Dath, Johannes Frisch und Thomas Weber. SRF 2014.
- Largoschmerzen. Ein sozialmedizinisches Desaster. Radio Drama with Mmt Bettina Lieder, Matthias Haase, Johanna Gastdorf, Mark Oliver Bögel, Sebastian Graf. Director: Leonhard Koppelmann. BR-Hörspiel und Medienkunst 2014. Podcast/Download via BR Hörspiel Pool.
- 2015: Mit Thomas Gebel: Deutsches Demokratisches Rechnen (Die Geschichte einer abgebrochenen Computerrevolution) – Director: Martin Heindel (Feature – RBB)
- Die Magnetin. Musikbild einer gefährlichen Liebe. Radio Drama by Dietmar Dath. Director: Iris Drögekamp & Thomas Weber. SWR 2015.
- Nie mehr warten. Ein Sprech-, Sing- und Musikdrama. Zur Russischen Revolution 1917. Radio Drama by Dietmar Dath. Director: Iris Drögekamp & Thomas Weber. SWR 2017.
- Maryam. Kein Nachruf für Euch. Radio Drama by Dietmar Dath. Composition and Songs: Sophia Kennedy. Director: Henri Hüster. BR/NDR 2019. Podcast/Download via NDR.

=== Translations ===
- Kodwo Eshun: Heller als die Sonne: Abenteuer in der Sonic Fiction. Id-Verlag 1999
- Joe R. Lansdale: Drive-In. Maas Verlag 1997
- Buddy Giovinazzo: Cracktown. Maas Verlag 1995
- Paul Di Filippo: Mund voll Zungen. Suhrkamp Verlag 2010

=== Other publications ===
- Liz Disch und der Hermit King. Mit: Ik krijg je nog wel und Adler in Ordnung. Hrsg. Barbara Kirchner, Kevil Library No.2, Graben Verlag 1994
- Contra naturam. In: Johannes Ullmaier (Hrsg.) Schicht! Arbeitsreportagen für die Endzeit, Frankfurt a/M: Suhrkamp, S. 386–411
- Vier Treppen durch Döblin. Essay. In: Neue Rundschau 120/1, S. 23–31. Frankfurt/Main: S. Fischer 2009
- Solus Ipse. Leerer Drache. Beitrag in: Karla Schmidt (Hrsg.): Hinterland. Nittendorf: Wurdack 2010. ISBN 978-3-938065-69-3
