= Jürgen Maurer =

Austrian actor

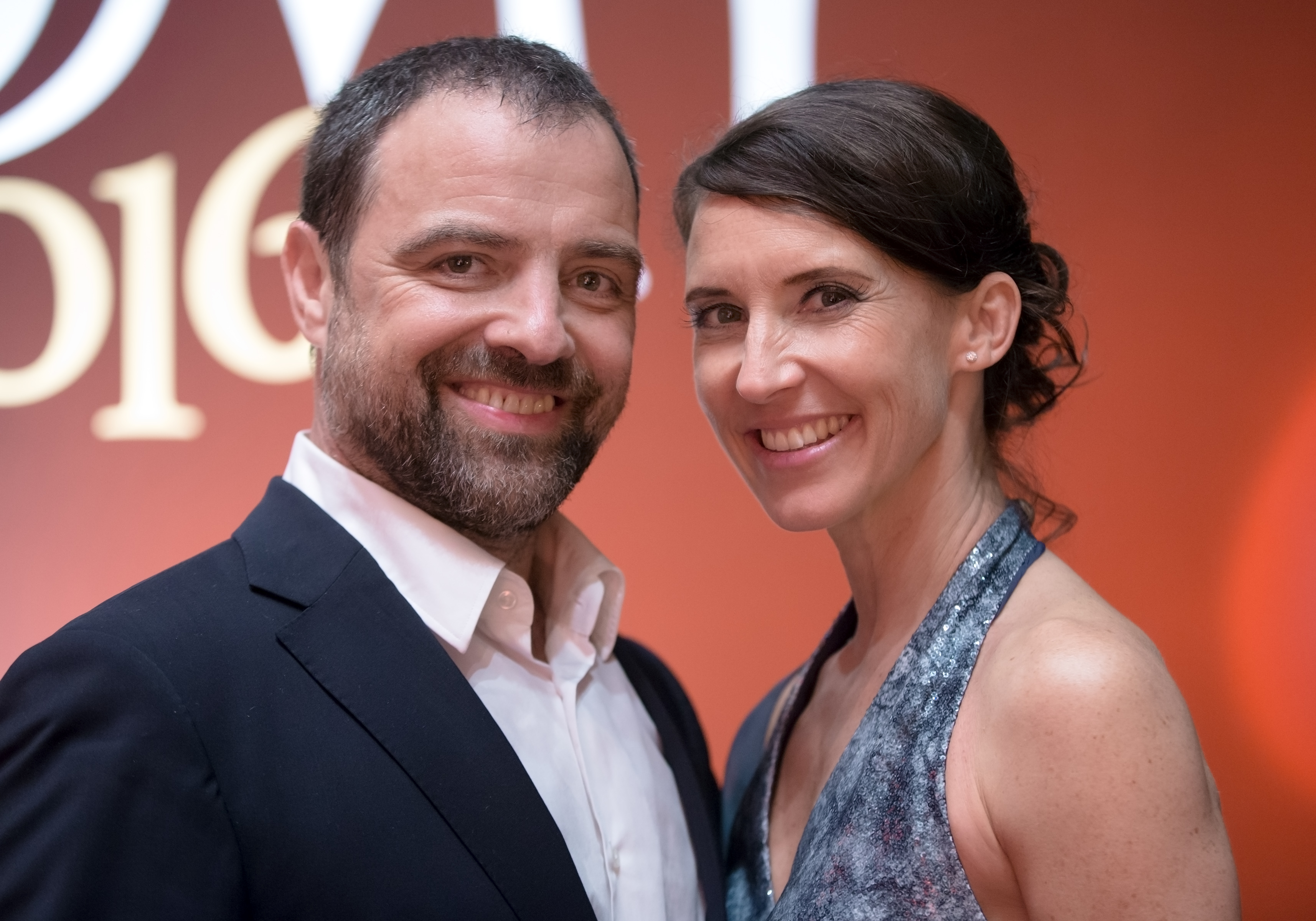
- Maurer with Maria Köstlinger at the 2016 Romy award
- Born: Jürgen Maurer; 30 January 1967 (age 59); Klagenfurt am Wörthersee, Austria
- Education: Academy of Fine Arts Vienna
- Occupation: Actor
- Years active: 1995–present

Jürgen Maurer (born 30 January 1967) is an Austrian stage and screen actor. He was a regular cast member of Austrian co-produced crime drama Tatort, and appeared in society drama Vorstadtweiber. He is known to English-speaking audiences for his role as Detective Oskar Rheinhardt in the British-Austrian series Vienna Blood.

== Early life and education ==
Maurer was born in Klagenfurt am Wörthersee. He graduated from the BRG Klagenfurt-Viktring in 1985 and then studied at the Academy of Fine Arts Vienna, where he settled.

From 1997 until 2012, Maurer was an actor with the Burgtheater ensemble.

He played a main role as Detective Oskar Rheinhardt in the British-Austrian series Vienna Blood.

In 2023 he played Gerd Schmidt in Bonn – Alte Freunde, neue Feinde, a political drama set in post-war West Germany in 1954.

== Filmography ==
=== Film ===
Year	Title	Role	Notes
1995	Tascheninhalt und Nasenbluten		Short film
2004	Die Josef Trilogie	Josef	
2006	Freundschaft	Didi Dobernig	
2009	Der Fall des Lemming	Breitner	
2015	Frau Müller muss weg!	Hape Höfel	
2017	Harri Pinter, Drecksau	Harri Pinter	
2021	Rotzbub	Pfarrer	

=== Television Film ===
Year	Title	Role	Notes
2001	Der Zerrissene	Wixer	
2006	Mozart Werke Ges.m.b.H.	Der Vorarbeiter ("The Foreman")	
2008	Der erste Tag	Leiter EKC	
2011	A Day for a Miracle	Thomas Wenninger	
2011	Weihnachtsengel küsst man nicht	Manfred Weissinger	
2012	The Tower	Lawyer Sperre	
2012	Reigen	Der Ehegatte ("The Spouse")	
2013	Eine unbeliebte Frau	Friedhelm Döring	
2013	Das Paradies in uns	Tom	
2014	Sarajevo	Justizchef Fiedler	
2015	Too Young to Die	René Novak	
2015	Meine fremde Frau	Marquard	
2016	Begierde – Jäger in der Nacht	Georg Holzner	
2017	Willkommen in der Patchwork-Hölle	Frank Wiedemann	
2018	In Wahrheit: Jette ist tot	Niklas Mohn	
2019	Silent Screams	Kurt Bremer	
2019	Der Anfang von etwas	Harry Hoppe	
2019	Südpol	Hans Wallentin	

=== Television ===
Year	Title	Role	Notes
1997	Alma - A Show biz ans Ende	Franz Werfel (young)	3 episodes
2007–2018	Tatort	Roland Rombach / Robert Kovar / Franz Wiegele / Mike Hansen / Thomas Vollmer / Jörn Brunner	7 episodes
2008	Die 4 da	Sprecher	Episode 2.7: "Das dritte Lager"
2008	Der Winzerkönig	Clemens Hoflehner	Episode 2.8: "Der Anschlag"
2009	Fast Forward	Ulrich Haderer	Episode 2.6: "Nico Hartmann"
2010	FC Rückpass	Anton Leopold Schurbitz	5 episodes
2010	Vitásek?	Witasek	Episode 1.5: "Doppelgänger"
2010	Eine Couch für alle	Sigmund Freud	4 episodes
2011	Das Glück dieser Erde	Josef Wagner	13 episodes
2012–2019	Spuren des Bösen	Gerhard Mesek	4 episodes
2012	SOKO Donau	Werner Swoboda	Episode 8.7: "Im freien Fall"
2013	Vier Frauen und ein Todesfall	Mike Teisnig	2 episodes
2013	Paul Kemp – Alles kein Problem	Reiner	Episode 1.2: "Die Hölle sind wir"
2014	Bösterreich	Würstelstandler Piefkelieb	Episode 1.7: "Politiker und Verbrecher"
2014	Die Detektive	Milan Ivankovic	Episode 1.5: "Der Selbstmordjob"
2014–2018	Neben der Spur	Kommissar Vincent Ruiz	6 episodes
2015–present	Vorstadtweiber	Georg Schneider	40 episodes
2015	Inspector Rex	Andreas Mitterer	Episode 16.11: "Ice Age"
2016, 2017	Die Chefin	Erik Lambert	4 episodes
2017	Cologne P.D.	Peter Uhlen	TV special: "Die Zeit heilt keine Wunden"
2017	Schuld nach Ferdinand von Schirach	Max Tackler	Episode 2.3: "Das Cello"
2017–present	In Wahrheit	Niklas Mohn	3 episodes Television film series
2018	Parfume	Matthias Köhler	6 episodes
2018	Der Kriminalist	Markus Kampmann	Episode 13.5: "Kleiner Bruder"
2019	M – A City Hunts a Murderer	Bruder Kommissar	4 episodes
2019	Der Kroatien-Krimi	Stojan Manojlovic	Episode 3.2: "Der Henker"
2019–2024	Vienna Blood	Oskar Reinhardt	11 episodes
2020	Wilsberg	Hartmut Niehoff	Episode: "Unser tägliches Brot"
2023	Bonn	Gerd Schmidt	6 episodes

=== Theatre ===
Year	Play	Role	Venue
1997–1998	Publikumsbeschimpfung	Speaker	Burgtheater, Vienna
1997–1998	Mother Courage and Her Children	Eilif / Medic	Burgtheater, Vienna
1997–1998	The Servant of Two Masters	Brighella	Burgtheater, Vienna
1998–1999	Romeo and Juliet	Peter	Burgtheater, Vienna
1998–1999	Professor Bernhardi	Hochroitzpointner	Burgtheater, Vienna
1998–1999	Ubu Roi	Papa Ubu	Burgtheater, Vienna
1999–2000	Der Färber und sein Zwillingsbruder	Sturm / Gemeiner / Hermanns Diener	Burgtheater, Vienna
1999–2000	Die Verschwörung des Fiesco zu Genua	Misfit	Burgtheater, Vienna
1999–2000	Kasino	Hans	Burgtheater, Vienna
1999–2000	Reigen	Poet	Burgtheater, Vienna
2000–2001	Heimatlos (Steirische Heimatrevue)	Seppl	Burgtheater, Vienna
2000–2001	Reineke Fuchs	King Noble	Burgtheater, Vienna
2001–2002	Cyrano de Bergerac	Lignière	Burgtheater, Vienna
2001–2002	The Maid of Orleans	Count Dunois	Burgtheater, Vienna
2001–2002	Der Zerrissene	Wixer	Burgtheater, Vienna
2002–2003	Hamlet	Guildenstern	Burgtheater, Vienna
2003–2004	Salome	Chor	Burgtheater, Vienna
2004–2005	Steppenwolf	Pablo	Burgtheater, Vienna
2004–2005	Mozart Werke Ges.m.b.H.	The Foreman	Burgtheater, Vienna
2004–2005	Vor Sonnenuntergang	Erich Klamroth	Burgtheater, Vienna
2005–2006	Boulevard Sevastopol	Georgij	Burgtheater, Vienna
2006–2007	Measure for Measure	Police Officer / Crowd	Burgtheater, Vienna
2006–2007	A Midsummer Night's Dream	Schnock	Burgtheater, Vienna
2007–2008	The Wars of the Roses	Warwick / Rivers / Father / Street Sweeper	Burgtheater, Vienna
2007–2008	Wallenstein	Deveroux	Burgtheater, Vienna
2007–2008	Incendies	Antoine	Burgtheater, Vienna
2008–2009	So leben wir und nehmen immer Abschied	Business Traveller	Burgtheater, Vienna
2008–2009	Trilogie des Wiedersehens	Lothar	Burgtheater, Vienna
2008–2009	Romeo and Juliet	Friar Laurence	Burgtheater, Vienna
2009–2010	Philotas	Parmenio	Burgtheater, Vienna
2009–2010	The Wonderful Wizard of Oz	Cowardly Lion	Burgtheater, Vienna
2009–2010	Immanuel Kant	Voice of Friedrich	Burgtheater, Vienna
2010–2011	Der Boxer oder Die zweite Luft des Hans Orsolics	Bussi / Announcer / Advertiser	Burgtheater, Vienna
2010–2011	Rasmus, Pontus och Toker	Patrick Persson	Burgtheater, Vienna
2010–2011	The Jewess of Toledo	Don Garceran	Burgtheater, Vienna
2011–2012	Troy	Agamemnon / Deiphobos	Burgtheater, Vienna
2011–2012	A Streetcar Named Desire	Steve Hubbel	Burgtheater, Vienna
2011–2012	The Broken Jug	Licht	Burgtheater, Vienna
