= Tribes of Europa =

German sci-fi television series

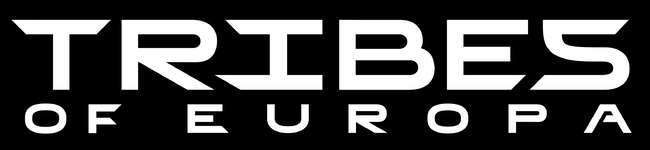
- Genre: Science fiction; Drama
- Written by: Philip Koch; Jana Burbach; Benjamin Seiler
- Directed by: Philip Koch; Florian Baxmeyer
- Starring: Emilio Sakraya; David Ali Rashed; Melika Foroutan; Oliver Masucci; Robert Finster; Benjamin Sadler; Ana Ularu; Jeanette Hain; Michaël Erpelding; James Faulkner; Johann Myers; Klaus Tange; Sebastian Blomberg; Jannik Schümann; Alain Blazevic
- Composer: Clinton Shorter
- Country of origin: Germany
- Original languages: German; English
- No. of seasons: 1
- No. of episodes: 6

Production
- Cinematography: Christian Rein
- Production company: W&B Television

Original release
- Network: Netflix
- Release: 19 February 2021

Tribes of Europa is a German dystopian sci-fi television series created by Philip Koch that premiered on Netflix on 19 February 2021.

In January 2024, Koch confirmed the show was cancelled after its first season.

== Synopsis ==
The story is set in 2074, 45 years after a mysterious global technological failure caused nations to slip into anomie and fracture into dystopian warring tribal microstates. On the European continent, there are hundreds of tribes, but the story focuses on three: the Origines, a tiny, peaceful forest tribe; the Crows, an aggressive warrior society; and the Crimsons, a militaristic society that aims at reuniting Europe by negotiation.

Three Origine siblings, a young woman, a young man, and their teenage brother, find their peaceful existence in the forest shattered when a pilot from Atlantis crashes an advanced hoverjet in their territory. When the siblings rescue the injured pilot, the youngest sibling recovers a mysterious cube with advanced technology from the wreck.

The Crows invade the Origine village to secure the technology, massacring most of the inhabitants. The older brother, Kiano, is sent to the Crows' slave factories. The sister, Liv, is knocked out in the massacre and comes to when Crows are searching for the cube. She shoots a female Crow warrior with a crossbow, and both are taken prisoner by the Crimson army. The younger brother, Elja, flees from the massacre with the cube, which is sought after by Crows, Crimson, and other powerful and resourceful figures.

== Cast and characters ==
- Henriette Confurius as Liv
- Emilio Sakraya as Kiano
- David Ali Rashed as Elja
- Melika Foroutan as Varvara
- Oliver Masucci as Moses
- Robert Finster as David
- Benjamin Sadler as Jakob
- Ana Ularu as Grieta
- Jeanette Hain as Amena
- Michaël Erpelding as Atlantian Pilot
- James Faulkner as General Cameron
- Johann Myers as Bracker
- Klaus Tange as Mark
- Sebastian Blomberg as Yvar
- Jannik Schümann as Dewiat
- Alain Blazevic as Crimson
- Hoji Fortuna as Ouk

== Episodes ==
No.	Title	Directed by	Written by	Original release date
1	"Chapter 1"	Philip Koch	Philip Koch	19 February 2021
In a dystopian future, society has broken down into tribes. One of these is the Origines tribe, who reject all modern technology and choose to live in the woods. Three Origine siblings are out hunting together when they see an Atlantian aircraft crash nearby. Elja, the youngest of the three, finds a strange cube in the wreckage and pockets it. Another, more powerful tribe—the bloodthirsty Crows—come searching for the cube and attack the Origine settlement, wiping out most of the population and taking the rest captive, including Elja's brother Kiano and their father. Elja escapes with the Atlantian cube, and his sister Liv, who had been stabbed and left for dead, awakes next to a small stream.
2	"Chapter 2"	Philip Koch	Benjamin Seiler, Jana Burbach & Philip Koch	19 February 2021
Elja meets a scavenger named Moses who, after stealing the cube, rescues him from a Crow party in search of the Atlantian technology. Returning to her settlement, Liv shoots a female Crow leader, who reveals to her that the Origines have been taken to Brahtok, a fortress city that used to be Berlin, to work as slaves. As she is about to slit the woman's throat, a group of soldiers from the militaristic Crimson tribe show up and capture them both. At the Crimson camp, Liv convinces David, the local commander, to let her speak to Grieta, the Crow captive, to figure out how she can infiltrate Brahtok and rescue her family.
3	"Chapter 3"	Florian Baxmeyer	Jana Burbach, Benjamin Seiler & Philip Koch	19 February 2021
To gain Grieta's trust, Liv takes matters into her own hands, pretending to betray David and leading Grieta out into the woods at gunpoint. Once Grieta reveals the way to infiltrate Brahtok, Liv alerts the Crimson soldiers using a flare, and the two are recaptured. Liv later shares a passionate moment with David. Elja and Moses arrive at the residence of Amena, an electronics engineer, who repairs the cube. Elja activiates it and it floats around, displaying holograms of unknown meaning. Kiano, still trying to find a way to escape from Brahtok, witnesses two other slaves smuggling wolk, a substance that the Crows manufacture using slave labour. He tries to inform Varvara, the Crow leader, so that he may win his freedom. His plan is foiled, however, and he is sentenced to death.
4	"Chapter 4"	Florian Baxmeyer	Jana Burbach, Benjamin Seiler & Philip Koch	19 February 2021
Moses agrees to take Elja to find Bracker, who can help fix the cube, which no longer works. As the two are departing, Amena's home is attacked by the Crow search party. At Brahtok, Kiano's life is spared by Varvara and he joins an elite group of her personal slaves. David and Liv are preparing to lead a Crimson team on a secret assault on Brahtok, but their plan is betrayed by David's lieutenant and he is placed under arrest for treason by General Cameron, the leader of the Crimsons. Kiano remains defiant towards Varvara, and she forces him to have sex with her. Elja and Moses arrive at Bracker's base and offer to make a deal with him, but he steals their cube instead. Kiano witnesses a Boj at a party thrown by Yvar, the leader of the Crows.
5	"Chapter 5"	Florian Baxmeyer	Benjamin Seiler, Jana Burbach & Philip Koch	19 February 2021
Liv brings David food and he tells her she must kill General Cameron so their mission can proceed. She is given a vial of poison as she goes to meet him. In Brahtok, Kiano asks Varvara for a Boj, and she humiliates him in combat as punishment. At Bracker's bar, Moses creates a distraction so that Elja can steal the cube back. He is caught in the act, however, and forced to reveal the real reason he wants the cube. He activates it, showing an impending catastrophe. Bracker agrees to let the two go. Varvara's hope of a promotion from Yvar is foiled and after Kiano tries to comfort her, she orders him to kill himself, only stopping him at the last moment. She promises him a Boj. Liv changes her mind about killing General Cameron after speaking to him. As Elja is leaving Bracker's, the Crow search party arrives. In his hand, the cube suddenly becomes a powerful weapon.
6	"Chapter 6"	Philip Koch	Philip Koch, Jana Burbach & Benjamin Seiler	19 February 2021
At Bracker's, the Crow party has caused mayhem, shooting indiscriminately. Elja intervenes with a demonstration of his new weapon just as they are about to execute Moses. As the cube loses energy, however, the pair must go on the run once more. Liv accompanies General Cameron and a team of Crimsons to Brahtok, using Grieta as a bargaining chip in order to secure a truce with the Crows and help Liv rescue her family. Stopped by a checkpoint, Cameron attempts to negotiate but the Crows are attacked by concealed snipers and the encounter turns into a bloodbath. Liv manages to drag the injured Grieta into a building. David, escaped from the cell at the Crimson base, now in charge of the assault party, finds her there and allows her to escape. She is left alone at the checkpoint until a Femen party on horseback find her. Entering the ring for his Boj, Kiano discovers that he must fight his father. He refuses, but, knowing that the alternative would be the death of both of them, the older man forces Kiano's hand, and the young Origine becomes a Bozie. Following the cube's directions to the Atlantian ark, Moses and Elja arrive at a deserted lake. Frustrated at their failure, Elja throws the cube and as it falls into the water, the ark emerges. The two step inside and the vessel becomes submerged once more.

== Use of Petrova Gora memorial setting ==
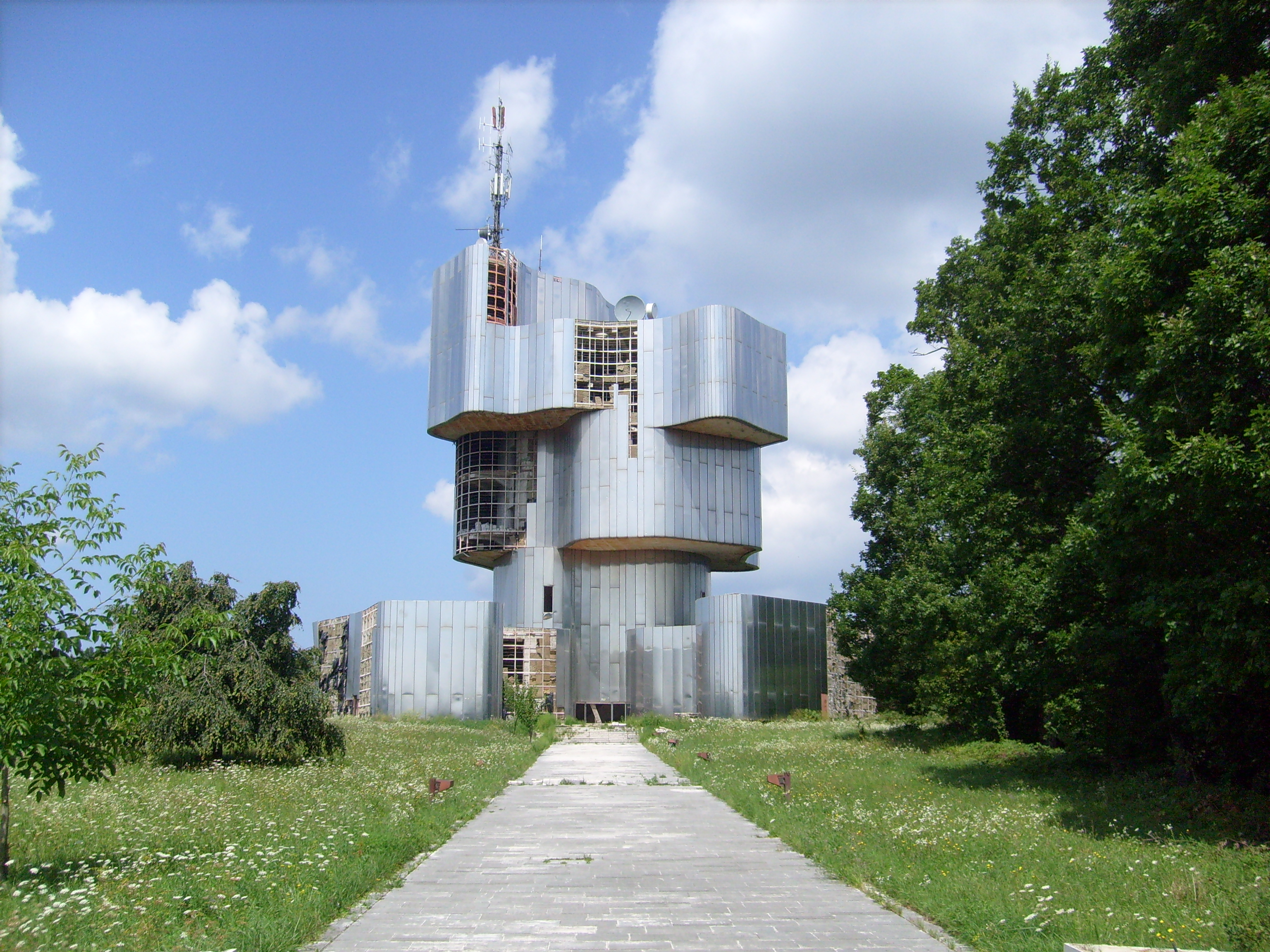
Petrova Gora Memorial

The series prominently featured the World War II Monument to the uprising of the people of Kordun and Banija in Croatia. Attention was brought to this usage following complaints from some visitors who were barred from accessing the site by security guards. The memorial was closed off to the public for several months during filming, as the production crew claimed to have permits from the Ministry of Culture and Media and the municipality.

American historical researcher and writer Donald Niebyl criticized the "exotification and orientalization of Yugoslav architecture" and warned about "sensitive memorial spaces being employed and decontextualized in the process of creating art and film". In her article "Tribes of New Fascism", Bojana Videkanić from the University of Waterloo described her "strong disgust" towards the usage of the monument as "a playground for the sadistic imagination" as well as due to "broader political issues that this kind of representation opens up". On 21 December 2021, Dubravka Ugrešić critiqued the use of Vojin Bakić's monument by the "cheap Netflix series Tribes of Europa" in her New Year article for Novosti. Večernji list's Denis Derk asked the Croatian public, "Are we ashamed that Bakić's monument is the backdrop for the European apocalypse?", while Jutarnji list's Jurica Pavičić described the landscape of a dystopian future as an unintentional allegory of modern-day Croatia. Aneta Vladimirov from the Serb National Council expressed unease over profit-making at the memorial site to which producers are not connected in any emotional way.

Despite negative public reaction, it was noted that the production crews cleaned up the site, including removing decades-old graffiti from the walls.
