= Kammerflimmer Kollektief =

German jazz group

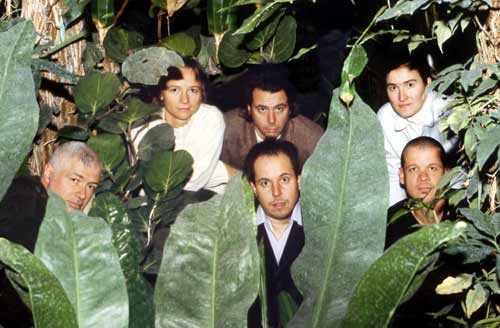
- Kammerflimmer Kollektief

Background information
- Origin: Germany
- Genres: Jazz, noise, electronic music, free jazz and experimental music
- Years active: 1997–present
- Members: Heike Aumüller, Johannes Frisch, Christopher Brunner, Heike Wendelin, and D. Wurm
- Website: www.kammerflimmer.com

Kammerflimmer Kollektief is a German musical group, founded by Thomas Weber, consisting of Heike Aumüller, Johannes Frisch, Christopher Brunner, Heike Wendelin, and D. Wurm. They play a mixture of jazz, noise, electronic music, free jazz and experimental music. Formed in 1997, they have released to date 8 albums, and have appeared on many jazz and electronic compilation albums. In 2012 they formed the band The Schwarzenbach together with German writer Dietmar Dath and released the album Farnschiffe.

== Discography ==
- Mäander, Payola (Europe) - 1999 / Temporary Residence Limited (United States) - 2001
- Incommunicado , Temporary Residence Limited (United States) - 2001 / Payola (Europe) - 1999
- Hysteria, Bubblecore (United States) / Payola (Europe) / After Hours (Japan) - 2001
- Cicadidae, Staubgold (Germany)/ Temporary Residence Limited (United States) - 2003
- Absencen, Staubgold - 2005
- Jinx, Staubgold - 2007
- Remixed (part I and II), Staubgold, features remixes of previous EPs.
- Im erwachten Garten (with Dietmar Dath), Implex/Staubgold/Verbrecher - 2009
- Wildling, Staubgold - 2010
- Teufelskamin, Staubgold - 2011
- Farnschiffe (as The Schwarzenbach with Dietmar Dath), ZickZack - 2012

== Compilations ==
- Einigen Wir Uns Auf Die Zukunft, Various Artists

CD/2xLP, Kitty-Yo, Payola, Kollaps 1997

- Tempo Technik Teamwork, Various Artists, Staubgold 2004
- Thank You, Various Artists, Temporary Residence Limited 2004
- Born Again: Collected Remixes 1999-2005, Sutekh

2xCD/LP, Leaf 2005

- Childish Music, Various Artists, Staubgold 2005
- Parerga, En/Of 028 12 inch, En/Of 2005, Limited Edition LP and artwork by De Rijke/De Rooij

4 Photos, each 20 x 30 cm, Edition of 100, signed & numbered on a certificate

- En/Of 001-030, Various Artists 3xCD, En/Of 2005
- Jukebox Buddha, Various Artists, Staubgold 2006, 15 tracks made with the FM3 Buddha Machine. Feat. Adrian Sherwood + Doug Wimbish, Blixa Bargeld, sunnO))), Thomas Fehlmann, Sun City Girls, Mapstation, Robert Henke a.o.
- Absencen Remixed 2x12"/CD, Staubgold 2005/2006, Feat. Radian, Secondo, Lump, Sutekh, J.Jelinek, A.Takamasa, Nôze & David Last a.o
- Kammerflimmer Kollektief / Strings Of Consciousness 10 inch, Karl-Records 2007

Hand-numbered edition of 500 items

- Bip-Hop Generation Vol. 9, Various Artists, Bip-Hop 2008
- Fantomastique Acoustica, Strings of Consciousness, Off Rds 2008
- Dinner Music For Clubbers: Peter Grummich Plays Staubgold, Staubgold 2008, No boundaries, just hot shit with love!“
- Muting The Noise, Various Artists, Innervisions 2008 feat. Âme, Henrik Schwarz, Terre Thaemlitz a.o.
- Rauschgold: Alec Empire Plays Staubgold, Staubgold 2009
