= Freud (TV series) =

German crime drama television series, first broadcast in 2020

- German-language poster
- Genre: Psycho, Crime
- Created by: Marvin Kren; Stefan Brunner; Benjamin Hessler
- Starring: Robert Finster; Ella Rumpf; Georg Friedrich; Stefan Konarske
- Composers: Stefan Will; Marco Dreckkötter
- Countries of origin: Austria; Germany
- Original languages: German; Hungarian
- No. of series: 1
- No. of episodes: 8

Production
- Camera setup: Markus Nestroy
- Running time: 45–55 minutes
- Production companies: Bavaria Fiction; Satel Film; Mia Film

Original release
- Network: ORF; Netflix
- Release: 23 March 2020

Freud is an Austrian-German crime thriller television series re-imagining the life of a young Sigmund Freud. The series produced 8 episodes which were first aired on ORF 15 March 2020 then released on Netflix on 23 March 2020.

== Plot ==
The story tells of a fictional criminal case in Vienna in 1886, which marked the start of a major conspiracy.

Sigmund Freud (Robert Finster) is a 30-year-old neurologist fascinated by hypnotherapy, discovered during a recent study trip to France in the well-known clinic of Dr. Jean-Martin Charcot, a fervent advocate of the psychic nature of hysteria. Despite the support of his mentor Josef Breuer (Merab Ninidze), Freud's innovative theories are met with rejection by Theodor Meynert, the director of the psychiatric hospital where he works, and by his colleagues, including Leopold von Schönfeld, Meynert's protégé.

Sigmund is persuaded by his friend Arthur Schnitzler (Noah Saavedra) to participate in a party organised by Countess Sophia von Szápáry (Anja Kling) under the pretext of expanding the circle of influential acquaintances. During the party, the countess together with her husband, Viktor von Szápáry (Philipp Hochmair), will stage a séance revolving around the figure of the Hungarian medium Fleur Salomé (Ella Rumpf).

From that moment, Sigmund will find himself in the midst of murders, conspiracies, revenges and supernatural facts that he will have to solve by resorting to his new knowledge and the help of his housekeeper Leonore and war-traumatised police inspector Alfred Kiss (Georg Friedrich).

== Episodes ==
The titles of the episodes quote Freud's works and concepts.

No.	Title	Directed by	Written by	Original release date
1	"Hysterie"	Marvin Kren	Stefan Brunner, Benjamin Hessler	March 15, 2020
Freud is preparing for a talk in front of the Viennese medical community. He would like to report on his study trip, during which he visited Jean-Martin Charcot at the psychiatric clinic of the Hôpital Salpêtrière, and demonstrate the effectiveness of hypnosis on his housekeeper Lenore. Freud's presentation is negatively received by the Viennese medical community, including Theodor Meynert and Leopold von Schönfeld. Inspector Kiss and his colleague Poschacher find Steffi Horvath covered in blood in Heinz Konrad's house. Dr. Freud tries to save her life, but it is too late and she succumbs to her stab wounds. Kiss finds in her room a uniform button with the regiment number 5 - the regiment in which he himself served. However, his superior Oskar Janecek does not want to investigate the case any further. Kiss continues on his own, and his investigations lead him to Oberleutnant Riedl and Georg von Lichtenberg. Together with his friend Arthur Schnitzler, Freud attends a party at the Szápáry Palace, hosted by the Hungarian Countess Sophia von Szápáry and Count Viktor von Szápáry. During a séance in which also Freud's critic Leopold von Schönfeld took part, he met the medium Fleur Salomé. She is plagued by dark visions about little Clara von Schönfeld. Salomé would like to be examined and treated for her temporary seizures by Freud. Freud tries to hypnotise her and analyse what Salomé experienced during the séance. In her vision, Salomé sees Clara von Schönfeld disappearing into the Viennese sewer system.
2	"Trauma"	Marvin Kren	Marvin Kren, Stefan Brunner, Benjamin Hessler	March 15, 2020
When Freud learns that Clara von Schönfeld has indeed disappeared, he is alarmed. An anonymous telegram takes the police officers Kiss and Poschacher, who are also investigating the case, to the Viennese sewer system, where they find Clara’s dog and later Clara herself. Freud and Schnitzler save Clara’s life and they find in her mouth a toe that has been severed from her foot, due to which she almost suffocated. Freud asks Clara's brother Dr. Schönfeld to take over the psychological treatment of the severely traumatised Clara, but Dr. Schönfeld refuses. Kiss believes Georg von Lichtenberg was the culprit in both crimes, due to a witness and a scar. He accuses him in front of his comrades. Von Lichtenberg in turn then challenges Kiss to a duel at the Linienwall. War veteran Kiss has repeatedly suffered from severe tremors since his military service and asks Freud for help. In a hypnosis session, Freud leads Kiss back to the war, where he had to kill prisoners on Lichtenberg's orders. Fleur Salomé convinces Clara's mother Henriette von Schönfeld to hand over the treatment of Clara to Freud. Salomé follows Clara in another hypnosis session in the Viennese sewer system, where she identifies Leopold von Schönfeld as the kidnapper of Clara.
3	"Somnambul"	Marvin Kren	Stefan Brunner	March 18, 2020
Alfred Kiss duels with Georg von Lichtenberg, Lichtenberg is hit and dies. Kiss himself remains unharmed, and when he fires the fatal shot he cries "for Otto". Georg's father, Feldmarschall Franz von Lichtenberg, is disappointed with his son, since he dishonoured the army. Together with his colleague Josef Breuer, Freud treats the blind Elise. While Freud tries to prove that Leopold von Schönfeld kidnapped his sister Clara, Countess Sophia von Szápáry orders Leopold, under the influence of hypnosis, to kill himself. However, at the last minute he does not complete the task. The ambitious Szápárys want to penetrate the highest social circles and hope to be invited to the Ball der Völker (Ball of the Nations). Crown Prince Rudolf of Austria-Hungary is present at one of their séances with Fleur. During the session, Fleur had another gory vision; after she has recovered from it, she visits Freud again. Under his hypnosis, she can see further details from the vision and identify two dead people and their murderer, the opera singer Frantisek Mucha. Freud then warns Kiss, and together they find the two dead people from Fleur's vision and the hypnotised Mucha nearby. After Fleur refused to be touched and hypnotised by Countess Sophia, the Countess visited Freud under a pretext and, under hypnosis, orders him to kill himself.
4	"Totem und Tabu"	Marvin Kren	Benjamin Hessler	March 18, 2020
Freud manages to react to Countess Sophia's order to commit suicide. Inspector Kiss, with the help of a witness, unmask Leopold von Schönfeld as the kidnapper of his sister Clara. Kiss and Freud then find Schönfeld dead in his apartment; in his room there is a symbol painted with blood on the wall. In a flashback, we learn that Otto Kiss, Alfred's son and Fanny's late husband, served in the army together with his father, and was about to be convicted of desertion. Georg von Lichtenberg forced Alfred Kiss to shoot some prisoners in order to prove his loyalty and to save Otto's life. Otto decided instead to take his own life. Under pressure from Feldmarschall Franz von Lichtenberg, Oberleutnant Riedl looks for Inspector Kiss, in order to take revenge for the death of Georg von Lichtenberg. Crown Prince Rudolf invites Fleur to his home under the pretext of a private séance, where he tries to rape her, while the Szápárys hope for an invitation to the Ball der Völker in return.
5	"Trieb"	Marvin Kren	Marvin Kren	March 18, 2020
After the meeting with Crown Prince Rudolf, Fleur flees to Freud and seduces him. During the night she keeps shouting the word Táltos. Fleur has another vision, where she sees Countess Sophia whispering repeatedly the word Táltos into her. While making love with Fleur, Freud is caught in flagrante by his future brother-in-law and his housekeeper Lenore. Opera singer Frantisek Mucha is going to be executed for murder without having made a confession. Inspector Kiss is attacked by two men in his apartment, but he overpowers them and kills them with a knife. Fanny calls Poschacher to help cover up the crime and to make the bodies of the two men disappear. Kiss and Poschacher suspect that they have been sent by Franz von Lichtenberg. Emperor Franz Josef, Crown Prince Rudolf, and Feldmarschall Franz von Lichtenberg are told by Caspari of a conspiracy against the imperial family in the Szápáry Palace. Rudolf suggests to invite the Szápárys to the Ball der Völker, in order to keep them watched. An ancestor of the Szápárys was one of the leaders of the Revolutions of 1848 in the Austrian Empire. Freud finds out the meaning of the word Táltos, a figure with supernatural powers from Hungarian mythology. He is disturbed by the sound of a piano in the neighbouring apartment. According to Lenore, the apartment has been uninhabited for a long time, and an immediate visit confirms it. The previous resident committed suicide after the Ringtheater fire, which took away all of his friends except for him. In the Szápáry Palace, young men gather for a ritual in which they bathe naked in blood.
6	"Regression"	Marvin Kren	Benjamin Hessler	March 22, 2020
Freud tries to find out more about the musician Szpilman from the neighbouring apartment, who was in a mental hospital and who committed suicide after the fire of the Ringtheater. He believed that he had started the fire himself. Freud suspects a connection between Szpilman and the Szápárys or Fleur Salomé. The Szápárys are invited by Crown Prince Rudolf to the Ball der Völker. Oberleutnant Riedl learns from Heinz Konrad that Inspector Kiss survived the attack and that two of Konrad's men had been killed. This leads to an argument and Riedl stabs Konrad to death. The prostitute Anneli reports to Kiss about the incident, and she can testify against Riedl. Poschacher warns him, however, that Riedl will turn his entire regiment against them. Oskar Janecek, Kiss's superior, decides to summon Riedl as a witness. During the fight with Konrad, Riedl was injured in the head, and his torn out hair was found at the crime scene. Because of this injury, Kiss hopes that Riedl will be convicted as the murderer of Konrad. Theodor Meynert surprised Freud with the information that Fleur Salomé was admitted to the mental hospital after she, with foam in the mouth, had attacked and injured a policeman at the Mölker Bastion. In front of Meynert, Freud accused the Szápárys to have manipulated Fleur Salomé, Frantisek Mucha, and Leopold von Schönfeld and instigated their acts. Meynert then threatens Freud to take him as a patient if he does not leave the building immediately and never re-enter. Freud asks Josef Breuer for help, but he refuses it as well. During the night Freud sneaks back into the asylum to free Fleur. He receives support from his housekeeper Lenore and his friend Arthur Schnitzler. Together they bring Fleur to Freud's home.
7	"Katharsis"	Marvin Kren	Stefan Brunner	March 22, 2020
Freud hides Salomé in his apartment, but Meynert and Breuer are already looking for him. During their visit, Freud and Salomé get to safety in the empty neighbouring apartment, where Fleur has another vision. Oberleutnant Riedl finally comes to the police station to testify for Konrad's murder, but instead bribes Janecek with the support of Franz von Lichtenberg. Kiss is taken under arrest but, with Poschacher's help, manages to escape. The two find shelter at Freud's apartment. In Georg von Lichtenberg's room, his father, Feldmarschall Franz von Lichtenberg, finds the knife with which Georg stabbed Steffi Horvath. The Feldmarschall tries to destroy all evidence. The Szápárys prepare themselves for their final blow against the imperial house, with the objective to make the people of the empire free and independent. In Freud's office, Freud, Kiss, and Fleur have to face their own inner demons. Freud learns that Fleur Salomé and Táltos are the same person. In a vision, Fleur sees an assassination attempt on the emperor.
8	"Verdrängung"	Marvin Kren	Stefan Brunner, Benjamin Hessler	March 22, 2020
The nobility from all parts of its multi-ethnic state, including the Szápárys, gather at the Ball der Völker of the Austrian Emperor Franz Josef in Schönbrunn Palace. Feldmarschall Franz von Lichtenberg and Oberleutnant Riedl find Kiss and Poschacher in Freud's apartment. While Lichtenberg is threatening to shoot Kiss, Kiss reports about the planned assassination attempt on the Emperor. At the ball the massacre begins but the emperor manages to get to safety. Fleur/Táltos orders the insurgents to surrender. Count and Countess Szápáry are killed by fusillading on the spot. In the palace gardens, the emperor is attacked by his son Rudolf, who is still under the influence of Táltos. However, the emperor succeeds in appeasing his son. While Freud is finishing his supposed Masterpiece The Power of Hypnosis, Martha Bernays is preparing for her wedding to Sigmund. She forgives him for the affair with Fleur. Feldmarschall Franz von Lichtenberg asks Freud to treat the Crown Prince, who is still under the influence of Táltos. Freud hypnotises the Crown Prince, and under the influence of hypnosis Rudolf tells him of Fleur's rape. Feldmarschall Lichtenberg starts a secret search for Fleur, since he sees in her a danger for the emperor. He also wants to prevent Freud's work to be published. Freud is offered money as well as his old job provided he does not report anything about the events in the imperial house. When Freud refuses, Lichtenberg blackmails him by threatening the life of his family. When Kiss is promoted to district inspector, he stabs his superior Janecek. Sigmund and Martha announce their marriage to the family. Freud burns his unpublished book and quits his old job with Professor Meynert. Kiss goes into hiding in the Viennese sewer system. Fleur unexpectedly visit Freud to thank him for his help and to say goodbye to him.

== Cast ==
=== Main characters ===
- Robert Finster: Sigmund Freud, 30-year-old Viennese Jewish doctor, disliked by the academic world for his ethnic origins and his scientific beliefs focused on hypnosis.
- Ella Rumpf: Fleur Salomé, Hungarian medium and foster daughter of Countess Sophia.
- Georg Friedrich: Alfred Kiss, former war veteran and Viennese police inspector.
- Brigitte Kren: Lenore, Freud's housekeeper and caretaker of the palace where he lives.
- Christoph Krutzler: Franz Poschacher, Alfred Kiss's colleague and trusted friend.
- Anja Kling: Countess Sophia von Szápáry, vengeful woman of Hungarian origin, persecuted together with her family by the Austrian empire.
- Philipp Hochmair: Count Viktor von Szápáry, husband of Sophia von Szápáry and accomplice in her conspiracies.

=== Recurring characters ===
- Lukas Watzl: Leopold von Schönfeld, protégé of prof. Meynert and Freud's opponent in the Vienna psychiatric hospital.
- Marisa Growaldt: Henriette von Schönfeld, authoritarian and hysterical mother of Leopold and Clara.
- Zuzana Zvonícková: Clara von Schönfeld, little sister of Leopold.
- Rainer Bock: Prof. Dr. Theodor Meynert, director of the psychiatric hospital in Vienna.
- Noah Saavedra: Arthur Schnitzler, friend of Freud and doctor in the psychiatric hospital.
- Merab Ninidze: Dr. Josef Breuer, Freud's main supporter in the psychiatric hospital.
- Karel Hermánek Jr.: Otto Kiss, deceased son of Alfred Kiss.
- Alina Fritsch: Fanny Kiss, daughter-in-law of Alfred Kiss, widow of his son Otto.
- Marie-Lou Sellem: Amalia Freud, Freud's mother.
- Pavel Fieber: Jacob Freud, Freud's father.
- Daniela Golpashin: Anna Bernays (née Freud), Freud's younger sister.
- Mercedes Müller: Martha Bernays, Freud's fiancée.
- Nadiv Molcho: Eli Bernays, Freud's brother in law, husband of his sister Anna and brother of his fiancée Martha.
- Lukas Miko: Georg von Lichtenberg, sworn enemy of Alfred Kiss since the war.
- Heinz Trixner: Feldmarschall Franz von Lichtenberg, father of Georg von Lichtenberg.
- Aaron Friesz: Oberleutnant Riedl, comrade in arms and lover of Georg von Lichtenberg.
- Stefan Konarske: Crown Prince Rudolf, heir to the Austrian throne.
- Johannes Krisch: Kaiser Franz Josef, Austrian Emperor.
- Markus Schleinzer: Caspari, a hungarian nobleman.
- Magdalena Kronschläger: Elise, a patient at the psychiatric hospital.
- Karl Welunschek: Herr Karl.
- Martin Zauner: Oskar Janecek, Kiss' superior.
- Angelika Niedetzky: Anneli, a prostitute.
- Matthias Franz Stein: Heinz Konrad.
- Martin Weinek: Herr Lauritz.
- Manuel Ossenkopf: Frantisek Mucha, an opera singer.

== Production ==
Filming took place in 2019, from January 8 to May 21, entirely in Prague, Czech Republic. The production consulted with Vienna-based psychoanalyst and hypnotherapist Juan José Rios.

== Reception ==
=== Ratings ===
Over 400,000 viewers tuned in when the show premiered on the Austrian channel ORF in early March 2020.

=== Critical response ===
The first season of Freud holds a 50% rating at critical aggregator site Rotten Tomatoes. Writing for The Guardian, Adrian Horton likened Freud to "other absurd revisions of famous stories" like Abraham Lincoln: Vampire Hunter. The Daily Beast writer Nick Schager made the same comparison, writing that the series' "marrying truth with paranormal nonsense proves reasonably enlivening".

=== Awards and nominations ===
Freud was nominated for two Romy Awards, in the categories of "Best TV Series" and "Best Production, TV Fiction".

== Historical inaccuracies ==
- The series implies that the mother of the Crown Prince Rudolf of Austria has long since died. On the contrary Elizabeth of Bavaria, the famous Sissi, died in 1898, therefore 9 years later than the death by suicide of her son Rudolf, which occurred in 1889.
- Sigmund Freud did indeed use cocaine until the age of forty. However the devastating effects of the drug had not yet been discovered, as it had been only recently introduced in the medical field. Freud himself treated cocaine as a common medicine by providing prescriptions of it to friends and relatives. At first, Freud thought it could be used in ophthalmology, but later, after learning its side effects, he changed his mind and permanently gave up on it.
- Hypnosis was Freud's "first unconventional love", which earned him various criticisms from contemporaries, as reported by the series. Nevertheless, as in the case of cocaine, Freud will abandon hypnosis after a first enthusiastic approach, preferring other techniques of unconscious investigation that will form the foundations of psychoanalysis.
- The Austrian emperor Franz Joseph I was indeed attacked by Hungarian revolutionaries but in totally different conditions. On February 18, 1853, while walking with Count Maximilian Karl Lamoral O'Donnell, he was attacked by a Hungarian worker, János Libényi, who intended to avenge the Hungarian victims of the Hungarian Revolution of 1848.
- Prince Rudolf was really a great supporter of liberal politics and the so-called "Hungarian Renaissance", so much that he forced his father to have him stalked by the secret police for fear of betrayal. Similar to the character of the series, he had a troubled sentimental life full of sad episodes. After his arranged marriage to Princess Stéphanie of Belgium, he contracted gonorrhea, which made him sterile, and fell in love with 17-year-old Maria Vetsera. Tormented by depression, he took his own life together with his lover in 1889.
- The character of Fleur Salomé is based on a famous figure of the time, Lou von Salomé. Unlike Fleur, she was Russian and not Hungarian. Lou was in correspondence with Freud whom she particularly esteemed. She is also remembered for being the inspiring muse of Thus Spoke Zarathustra by Nietzsche, whose advances she refused. She also had a romantic relationship with the poet Rainer Maria Rilke and with the psychoanalyst Viktor Tausk.
- Josef Breuer was the first psychiatrist to treat hysteria with hypnosis. Thanks to Breuer, indeed, Freud became interested in hypnotherapy and the psychic nature of hysteria. Their joint studies and experiments will result in the first pre-psychoanalytic treatise in history, Studies on Hysteria.
- Unlike what the series tells, Freud met Arthur Schnitzler in person only in the early twenties of the twentieth century. Their relationship in previous years was exclusively epistolary. From their letters, it is clear that Arthur Schnitzler, although influenced by Freudian theories and esteemed by Freud himself, did not appreciate the psychoanalytic reading of his works, preferring instead a purely literary analysis. The two will never be able to develop a solid friendship and it seems that Freud had a certain unconscious fear towards Arthur, motivated by the fact that he perceived him as his ‘double’.

Moreover many psychological terms and concepts that Freud uses in the series (set in 1886) were introduced by him only later:

- The cathartic method and the affect trauma model were first presented by Freud in 1895 in his Studies on Hysteria.
- Still in 1895, in Project for a Scientific Psychology, he introduced for the first time the metaphor of consciousness as “light”, which gives only a limited insight into the interior, while the rest remains hidden in the “shadow”.
- The term "unconscious" (Unbewusste) first came up in 1897 in a letter to Wilhelm Fließ and was only publicly discussed in 1899 in the seventh chapter of The Interpretation of Dreams.
- He first spoke of "repression" (Verdrängung) in 1899 in his treatise on Interpretation of Dreams.
- The term "instinct/drive" (Trieb) was first mentioned in his Three Essays on the Theory of Sexuality in 1905 and was described in more details in 1915 in Instincts and their Vicissitudes.
- The concept of “Taboo” was first explored in 1912–1913 with Totem and Taboo.
- The notion of "Eros" was not introduced until 1920 that Beyond the Pleasure Principle.
- The role of fear was only understood in 1926 in Inhibitions, Symptoms and Anxiety.

== See also ==
- Vienna Blood (TV series), Freud helps solve murders; these two series are extremely similar - but distinct.
