= Frank Tallis =

Author and psychologist

- Born: September 1, 1958 (age 68)
- Occupations: Author, clinical psychologist
- Writing career
- Pen name: F.R. Tallis
- Genres: Non-fiction, psychology, psychological journalism, crime fiction, horror fiction

Frank Tallis (born 1 September 1958) is an English author and clinical psychologist, whose area of expertise is obsessive-compulsive disorder (OCD). He has written crime novels, including the collection of novels known as the Liebermann Papers, for which he has received several awards, is an essayist, and—under the name of F.R. Tallis—has written horror fiction. The Liebermann novels have been adapted by Stephen Thompson into the BBC TV series Vienna Blood, which first aired in 2019.

== Early life ==
Frank Tallis was born Francesco de Nato Napolitano and grew up working class in Tottenham, UK. After he left school he initially lived an unsteady life, teaching piano and playing in a rock band. Then he married, and lived in the country for a while with his wife and their child.

== Psychologist ==
After he and his wife divorced he earned a doctorate in psychology and worked for the British National Health Service for a long time, taught clinical psychology and neuroscience at King's College London, and treated private patients. Tallis has been a full-time writer since the late 2000s and lives in London.

== Writing ==
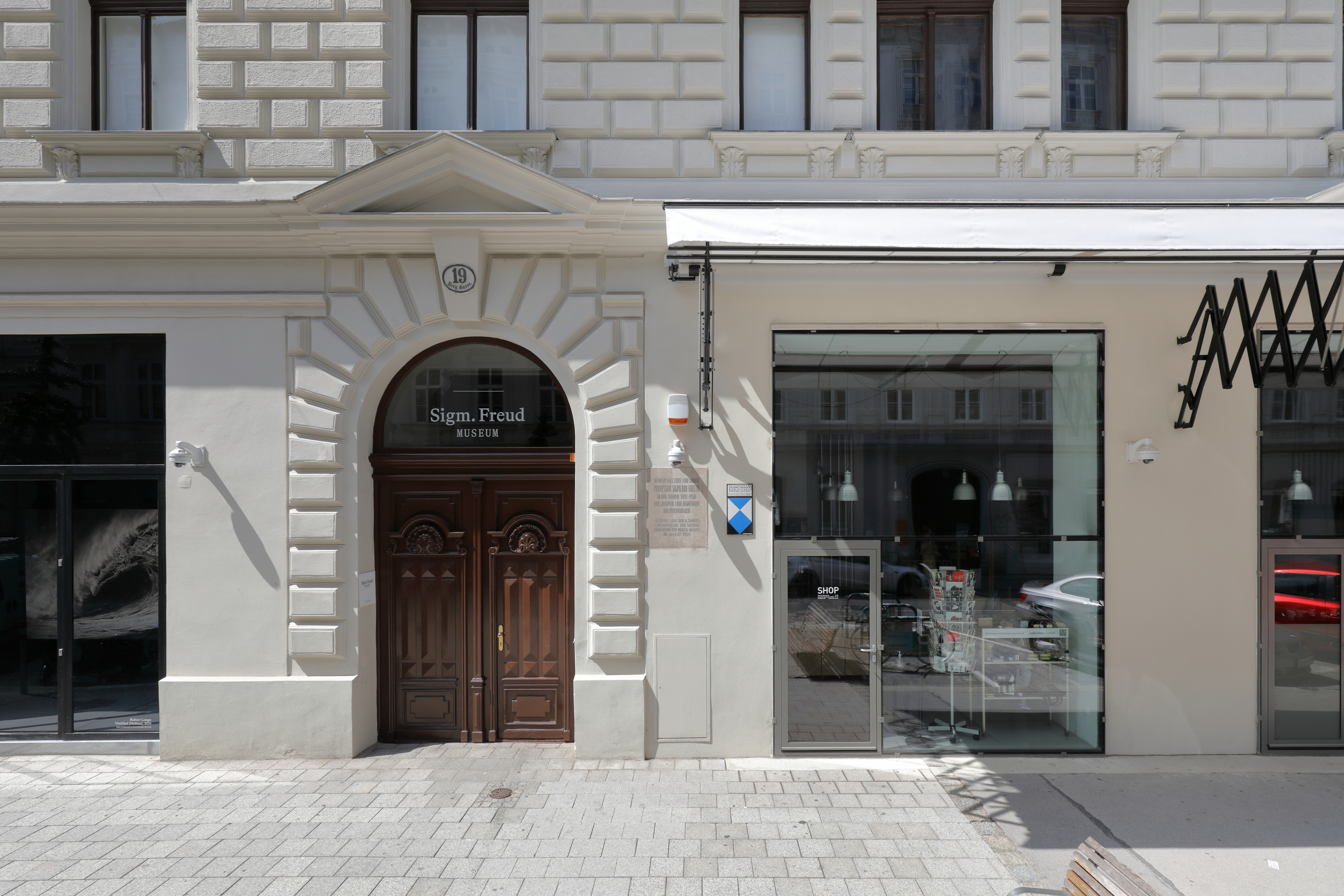
Entrance to Sigmund Freud's former home and workplace at Berggasse 19 in Vienna, one of the settings for Tallis's novels and now used as the Sigmund Freud Museum.

Tallis has published more than 30 articles in psychology and psychiatry journals. He has written four popular science books on psychology, drawing on anonymized case studies from his therapeutic practice, including The Incurable Romantic and Other Unsettling Revelations, in which he deals with the phenomenon of obsessive love. Since 2005, Tallis has been writing crime novels, published under the rubric of the Liebermann Papers and set in Vienna around the beginning of the 20th century. The two main characters are Vienna police inspector Oskar Reinhardt and his friend and adviser, psychiatrist Max Liebermann, a student of Sigmund Freud and a regular guest at Freud's apartment at Berggasse 19, now the Sigmund Freud Museum in Vienna.

== Bibliography ==
=== Non-fiction ===
- 1990: How to Stop Worrying, Sheldon (London), ISBN 978-1847090898
- 1992: Understanding Obsessions and Compulsions: A Self- Help Manual, Sheldon (London), ISBN 978-0859696524
- 1994: Worrying: Perspectives on Theory, Assessment, and Treatment (co-editor with Graham C. Davey), Wiley (New York), ISBN 978-0471968030
- 1994: Coping with Schizophrenia (co-author with Steven Jones), Sheldon (London), ISBN 978-0859696791
- 1995: Obsessive Compulsive Disorder: A Cognitive and Neuropsychological Perspective, Wiley (New York), ISBN 978-0471957720
- 1998: Changing Minds: The History of Psychotherapy as an Answer to Human Suffering, Cassell (New York), ISBN 978-0304703630
- 2002: Hidden Minds: A History of the Unconscious, Arcade Publishing (New York), ISBN 978-1611455052
- 2005: Love Sick: Love as a Mental Illness, Da Capo Books, ISBN 978-1560256472
- 2015: The Sheldon Short Guide to Worry and Anxiety, SPCK, ISBN 978-1847093646
- 2019: The Incurable Romantic and Other Unsettling Revelations, Abacus, ISBN 978-0349142951
- 2020: The Act of Living: What the Great Psychologists Can Teach Us About Finding Fulfillment, Basic Books, ISBN 978-1541673038
- 2024: Mortal Secrets: Freud, Vienna and the Discovery of the Modern Mind, St. Martin's Press, ISBN 978-1250288950
- 2026: Wise: Finding Purpose, Meaning and Wisdom Beyond the Midpoint of Life, Abacus Books, ISBN 978-0349146218

=== Crime fiction ===
==== Max Liebermann mysteries ====
- 2005: Mortal Mischief: (Liebermann Papers 1), Arrow Books, ISBN 978-0099471288; U.S. title: A Death in Vienna, Random House, ISBN 978-0812977639
- 2006: Vienna Blood: (Liebermann Papers 2), Arrow Books, ISBN 978-0099471325
- 2008: Fatal Lies: (Liebermann Papers 3), Century, ISBN 978-0812977776
- 2009: Darkness Rising: (Liebermann Papers 4), Century, ISBN 978-0099519744; U.S. title: Vienna Secrets, Random House, ISBN 978-0812980998
- 2010: Deadly Communion: (Liebermann Papers 5), Arrow Books, ISBN 978-0099519720; U.S. title: Vienna Twilight, Random House, ISBN 978-0812981001
- 2011: Death and the Maiden: (Liebermann Papers 6), Arrow Books, ISBN 978-1846053573
- 2018: Mephisto Waltz, Pegasus Books, ISBN 978-1643130507

=== Horror fiction ===
==== Writing as F.R. Tallis ====
- 2014: The Voices, Pan, ISBN 978-1447236023
- 2016: The Forbidden, Pan, ISBN 978-1447204985
- 2017: The Sleep Room, Pegasus Books, ISBN 978-1447204992
- 2017: The Passenger, Pegasus Books, ISBN 978-1681773315

== Awards and nominations ==
- 1999: Writers' Award, Arts Council of Great Britain, 1999
- 2000: New London Writers award, London Arts Board, for Killing Time.
- 2005: Mortal Mischief nominated for the Ellis Peters Historical Dagger award.
- 2007: Mortal Mischief nominated for the French Quais du Polar prize
