= 4 Freunde und 4 Pfoten =

2003 German children's film

- Theatrical release poster
- Directed by: Gabriele Heberling
- Written by: Markus Steffl
- Produced by: Bernd Gaul; Günter Fenner
- Starring: Alexander Gaul; Kai-Michael Muller; Martha Reckers; Nicole Müller
- Cinematography: Michael Bertl
- Edited by: Simone Klier
- Music by: Don Philippe
- Production companies: X Filme Creative Pool; Perfect Film; Saxonia Media
- Distributed by: X Verleih AG (through Warner Bros. Pictures)
- Release date: 9 October 2003
- Running time: 77 minutes
- Country: Germany
- Language: German
- Box office: $1.3 million

4 Freunde und 4 Pfoten – Ein tierisches Abenteuer is a 2003 German children's film directed by Gabriele Heberling, starring Alexander Gaul, Kai-Michael Muller, Martha Reckers and Nicole Müller.

The film was released on 9 October 2003 by X Verleih AG through Warner Bros. under their Family Entertainment label.

== Plot ==
The story revolves around four good friends — Jule, Mike, Moritz, and Tine — whose summer becomes eventful when they learn that the nearby animal shelter, operated by benevolent Frau Schirmer, is threatened with closure because of financial issues and a greedy land developer. With the assistance of their good dogs, the children hatch a plan to rescue the shelter, hosting fundraisers and revealing the developer's nefarious plans. Along the way, they rise to confront the challenges of friendship and adolescence, ultimately triumphing over adversity through cooperation, perseverance, and the special connection that exists between humans and animals. The movie testifies to the strength of friendship, compassion, and courage in the face of injustice.

== Cast ==
- Alexander Gaul as Alexander Schönberg
- Kai-Michael Muller as Robby Matkowski
- Martha Reckers as Hedwig
- Nicole Müller as Lilly Schönberg
- Martin Semmelrogge as Franz Bommer
- Michael Lott as Titus Peck
- Steffen Schult as Luc Lulac
- Elisabeth Scherer as Mimi Klopfstein
- Edda Leesch as Katja Schönberg
- Karl Kranzkowski as Paul Matkowski
