= Otto John =

West German intelligence services administrator (1909-1997)

President of the Federal Office for the Protection of the Constitution
- In office 1 December 1950 – 20 July 1954
- President: Theodor Heuss
- Chancellor: Konrad Adenauer
- Preceded by: Office established
- Succeeded by: Hanss Jess

Personal details
- Born: 19 March 1909 Marburg, German Empire
- Died: 26 March 1997 (aged 88) Innsbruck, Austria
- Education: University of Marburg
- Occupation: Lawyer, civil servant

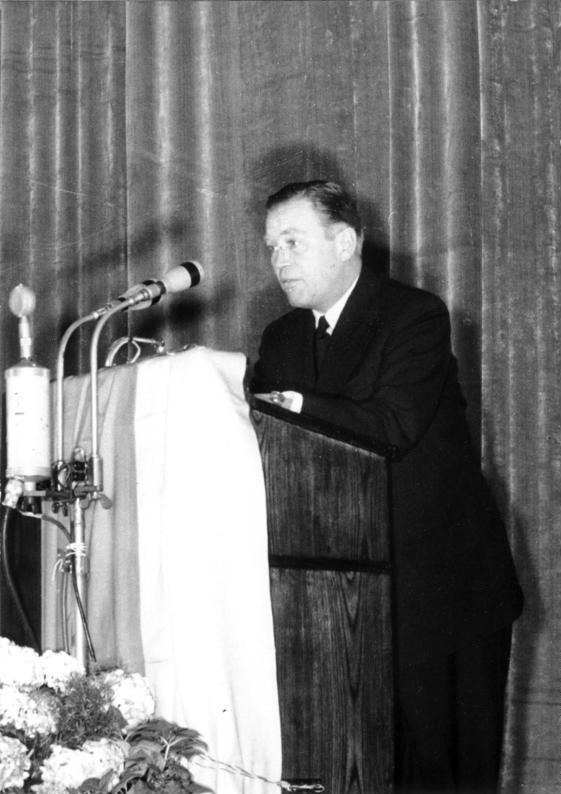
Otto John, 1954

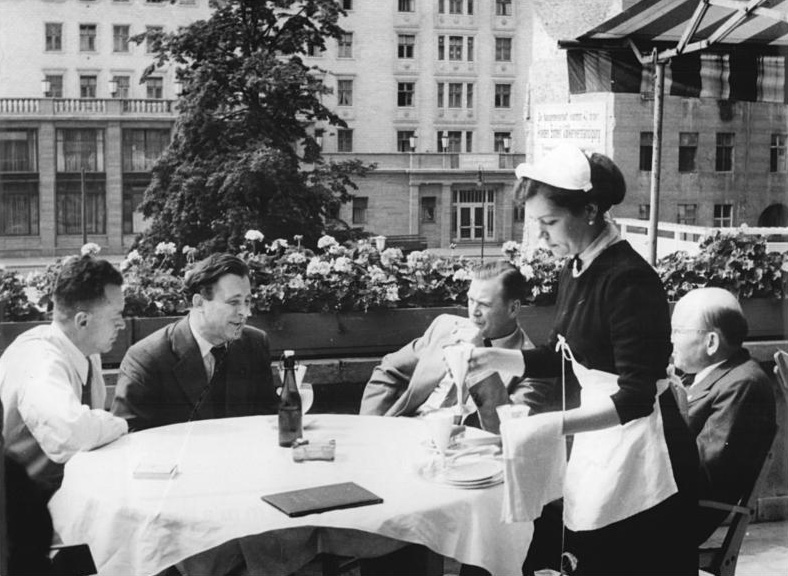
Otto John (3rd from left) in East-Berlin with Wilhelm Girnus, Hermann Henselmann and Erich Correns (6 August 1954)

Otto John (19 March 1909 – 26 March 1997) was a German lawyer and intelligence official. During World War II, he was a conspirator in the 20 July plot to assassinate Adolf Hitler. Following the war, he became the first head of West Germany's domestic intelligence service, the Federal Office for the Protection of the Constitution. In July 1954, he surfaced in East Germany, where he made public appearances criticizing the government in Bonn and Chancellor Konrad Adenauer. After his return to West Germany in 1955, despite maintaining that he had been drugged and kidnapped, John was convicted and sentenced to prison for treason.

== Life ==
Otto John was born in Marburg. He earned a doctorate of law from the University of Marburg.

=== World War Two and aftermath ===
John was involved in the plot of 20 July 1944 to assassinate Adolf Hitler, along with his brother, Hans, who was executed. Otto John left the plot's headquarters just before the revolt collapsed and four days later travelled to neutral Spain on a Lufthansa flight and used contacts he had made with British intelligence to escape to Britain, avoiding arrest and probable execution.

In Britain, John worked for the BBC German Language Service and in black propaganda at 'The Rookery' in the village of Aspley Guise, near Milton Keynes, England, and towards the end of the war for Soldatensender Calais.

After the war, John helped British authorities to categorise the degree of Nazi ideology of German wartime leaders and appeared as a witness at the Nuremberg War Crimes Trials. During the trial of Erich von Manstein he worked as an interpreter.

=== Appointment as spy chief ===
On 4 December 1950, John was appointed president of the West German Federal Office for the Protection of the Constitution (Bundesamt für Verfassungsschutz). His appointment went against the will of Chancellor Konrad Adenauer but was supported by British officials.

=== Abduction and life in East Germany ===
On 20 July 1954, after a ceremony remembering the conspirators of 1944, John left his hotel and disappeared.

According to Markus Wolf, head of the DDR's foreign intelligence service, John had been drugged and abducted through an acquaintance, Dr. Wohlgemuth. John did not want to defect but considered after his kidnapping that he was irreparably compromised. He reappeared three days later in East Berlin, stating that he had decided to move to East Germany and criticizing Adenauer's policies of remilitarisation and integration into the Western Bloc, which in his view hampered German reunification. He also criticized the appointment of former Nazis, such as Theodor Oberländer and Reinhard Gehlen, to high office.

From August to December, John was interrogated by the KGB in Moscow before he returned to East Berlin, where he resumed his criticism of West Germany as a speaker. During that time, he was under the surveillance of East Germany's security service, the Staatssicherheit.

=== Return to West Germany and treason trial ===
Eventually, John escaped back to West Germany, claiming that he had been abducted and had only spoken out because he feared for his safety. His explanation was not believed, and he was charged with treason and sentenced to four years' imprisonment. John expressed bitterness about the fact that in the court that found him guilty, there were judges who had been on the bench during the Hitler era. He was released on 28 July 1958.

=== Personal life ===
John married Lucie Manén in 1949. He died in 1997, at an Innsbruck sanatorium, after years of trying to get rehabilitation for his treason conviction.

== In popular culture ==
In the 2023 political thriller TV series Bonn, set in Germany in 1954 and aired in Das Erste, John is played by Sebastian Blomberg.

== Books ==
- Twice Through the Lines – Futura Publications (1974). ISBN 978-0-86007-036-8
