= Vienna Blood (TV series) =

British-Austrian police procedural television series based on novels by Frank Tallis

- Title card
- Genre: Period drama Detective fiction
- Based on: The Liebermann series by Frank Tallis
- Written by: Steve Thompson
- Starring: Matthew Beard; Juergen Maurer
- Composer: Roman Kariolou
- Countries of origin: United Kingdom; Austria
- Original language: English
- No. of series: 4
- No. of episodes: 11

Production
- Producers: Steve Thompson; Oliver Auspitz; Andreas Kamm; Jez Swimer
- Cinematography: Andreas Thalhammer; Xiaosu Han
- Running time: 90 minutes
- Production companies: Endor Productions; MR Film

Original release
- Network: BBC Two
- Release: 18 November 2019 – 4 August 2024

Vienna Blood is a British-Austrian procedural drama television series set in Vienna, Austria, in the early 1900s. Based on the Liebermann novels by Frank Tallis, the series follows Max Liebermann (Matthew Beard), a doctor and student of Sigmund Freud, as he assists Police Detective Oskar Reinhardt (Jürgen Maurer). By providing psychological insights into the subjects’ motives, they investigate disturbing murders with success. A continuing sub-theme is the growing antisemitism against the Liebermann family. Max is a member of a liberal British Jewish family in Leopoldstadt, a traditional Jewish district, while Oskar, a lapsed Catholic, is based at that district's police precinct.

The first series began broadcasting on BBC Two on 18 November 2019. On 6 July 2020, it was recommissioned for a second series, which premiered in 2021. The programme was renewed for a third series, which began broadcasting on BBC Two on 14 December 2022, and a fourth and final series, which began airing on 4 August 2024.

== Cast ==
=== Main ===
- Matthew Beard as Max Liebermann
- Juergen Maurer as Oskar Reinhardt
- de:Luise von Finckh as Clara Weiss
- Jessica De Gouw as Amelia Lydgate (Series 1)
- Lucy Griffiths as Amelia Lydgate (Series 2)
- Amelia Bullmore as Rachel Liebermann
- Conleth Hill as Mendel Liebermann

=== Recurring ===
- Charlene McKenna as Leah Liebermann
- Oliver Stokowski as Professor Gruner (Series 1-2)
- Raphael von Bargen as Inspector/Commissioner von Bulow
- Simon Hatzl as Police Commissioner August Strasser (Series 1-4)
- Josef Ellers as Sergeant Haussmann
- Harald Windisch as Professor Matthias (Series 1)
- Luis Aue as Daniel Liebermann (Series 1)
- Miriam Hie as Lisa Linder (Series 2-4)
- Florian Teichtmeister as Jonas Korngold (Series 2)

=== Guest ===
- Ulrich Noethen as Graf von Triebenbach
- Michael Niavarani as Herr Bieber
- Ursula Strauss as Juno Holderlein
- Johannes Krisch as Major Julius Reisinger
- Kathrin Beck as Madame Borek
- Leonie Benesch as Helena Rieger

== Episodes ==
Series	Episodes	Originally released	
Series	Episodes	First released	Last released
1	3	18 November 2019	2 December 2019
2	3	10 December 2021	24 December 2021
3	3	14 December 2022	28 December 2022
4	2	4 August 2024	11 August 2024

=== Series 1 (2019) ===
No.	Title	Directed by	Written by	Original release date	U.K. viewers (millions)
1	"The Last Seance"	Robert Dornhelm	Steve Thompson	18 November 2019	1.8
When a medium is found dead in mysterious circumstances, Dr Max Liebermann is called upon by Inspector Oskar Reinhardt of the Vienna Police to assist in finding her murderer.
2	"Queen of the Night"	Umut Dag	Steve Thompson	25 November 2019	N/A
A grisly series of murders in Vienna's slums leads to a speedy arrest, but Oskar and Max disagree over a suspect.
3	"The Lost Child"	Umut Dag	Steve Thompson	2 December 2019	N/A
Max's nephew suffers a breakdown after the drowning of a fellow cadet at a military academy. Max suspects foul play.

=== Series 2 (2021) ===
No.	Title	Directed by	Written by	Original release date	U.K. viewers (millions)
1	"The Melancholy Countess"	Robert Dornhelm	Steve Thompson	10 December 2021	N/A
A widowed countess dies in an apparent suicide but later it is found she was murdered. She had consulted Max. Why was she so unhappy?
2	"The Devil's Kiss"	Robert Dornhelm	Steve Thompson	17 December 2021 (Note: "The Devil's Kiss" was released on 10 December 2021, on BBC iPlayer.)	N/A
A young pickpocket discovers a badly mutilated body which leads Oskar on the trail of an anarchist determined to disrupt the signing of a treaty.
3	"Darkness Rising"	Robert Dornhelm	Steve Thompson	24 December 2021 (Note: "Darkness Rising" was released on 10 December 2021, on BBC iPlayer.)	N/A
Following an altercation at a lecture, a monk is killed. A suspect is arrested, the brother of Clara's fiancé. Max doesn’t think he killed the monk and goes undercover to find out what happened.

=== Series 3 (2022) ===
No.	Title	Directed by	Written by	Original release date	U.K. viewers (millions)
1	"Deadly Communion"	Robert Dornhelm	Steve Thompson	14 December 2022	N/A
A young seamstress is murdered in a luxury fashion house. Oskar and Max are initially perplexed, but further clues are revealed when Max receives a letter at his new practice.
2	"The God of Shadows"	Robert Dornhelm	Steve Thompson	21 December 2022	N/A
Max applies his neurological expertise to the case of a retired soldier, Captain Steiner, who is convinced that he is cursed and tortured by vengeful spirits.
3	"Death Is Now a Welcome Guest"	Robert Dornhelm	Steve Thompson	28 December 2022	N/A
When a famous film star dies during the premiere of her new film, Max and Oskar's investigation gets them embroiled in the dark underbelly of stardom and far-right politics.

=== Series 4 (2024) ===
No.	Title	Directed by	Written by	Original release date	U.K. viewers (millions)
1	"Mephisto Waltz - Part One"	Umut Dag	Steve Thompson	4 August 2024	N/A
A traitor is leaking state secrets that threaten to destabilise the Austro-Hungarian empire. Oskar and Max are compelled to seek the identity of this high-powered individual.
2	"Mephisto Waltz - Part Two"	Umut Dag	Steve Thompson	11 August 2024	N/A
Oskar is determined to track down the gunman who attempted to kill Max. He soon discovers how powerful his adversary is when he is framed for murder.

=== Series 4 (2025) U.S. ===
No.	Title	Directed by	Written by	Original release date	U.S. viewers (millions)
1	"Mephisto Waltz"	Umut Dag	Steve Thompson	4 January 2025	N/A
A traitor is leaking state secrets that threaten to destabilise the Austro-Hungarian empire. Oskar and Max are compelled to seek the identity of this high-powered individual.
2	"A Winning Hand"	Umut Dag	Steve Thompson	11 January 2025	N/A
A murder takes Oskar and Max's investigation into a world of underground gambling; Oskar's life is complicated by his feelings for Therese; Max questions if he and Clara are meant to be together.
3	"The Enemy Within"	Umut Dag	Steve Thompson	18 January 2025	N/A
Max is in a coma, and doctors don't know if he will survive; old friends stand by Oskar when he is forced to go on the run. Oskar is determined to track down the gunman who attempted to kill Max. He soon discovers how powerful his adversary is when he is framed for murder.
4	"The Face of Mephisto"	Umut Dag	Steve Thompson	25 January 2025	N/A
Oskar identifies suspects but is unable to connect them to Mephisto; Oskar finds himself in the middle of an assassination attempt when he arranges a rendezvous with Mephisto.

== Production ==
The series was a coproduction of Endor Productions and MR Film (Austria).

In August 2024, author Frank Tallis said that while the latest episodes covered the last published book in the series, "when you exhaust the books, if you've let the idea develop and gain its own momentum, in a way it doesn't need the novels or the author anymore… but doesn't in any way stop me from writing proposals or plot ideas!" Austrian interviews with the producers, as the fourth season broadcast in Austria in December 2024, left open whether it was the definitive end of the series or whether there could be a continuation in the future. On June 5, 2024, it was announced that production company Endor Productions would close, due to financial difficulties in the television market, leaving any continuation further in doubt.

=== Locations ===
The first series was filmed on location in Vienna and Lower Austria, beginning in October 2018. Locations included the Vienna State Opera house and Volkstheater as well as Landstrasse, Hauptstrasse, Herz Jesu church, Votivkirche, St Charles Borromeo Church, Griechengasse, de:Mölker Steig, de:Schreyvogelgasse, Dreimaderlhaus, Schonlaterngasse, Alte Schmiede, the Vienna University Archive, the Billrothhaus (Vienna 9), the Natural History Museum, Palais Pallavicini, the Burggarten park, the Stadpark, the Arsenal, Otto Wagner Hospital, Villa Mauthner von Markhof, Kirche am Steinhof, the Riesenrad (big wheel), Stephansdom, Sankt-Ulrichs-Platz, Palais Pallavicini, National Library, Zentralfriedhof, de:Friedhof der Namenlosen, Museum of Military History, Cafe Morgenstern, Café Sperl and Café Bräunerhof and features the Beethoven Frieze. In Lower Austria the Schloss Grafenegg appears.

Series 2 was also filmed in Vienna and Lower Austria, featuring such locations as Hotel Imperial, the Stadtpark, Kursalon Hübner, Schönbrunn Palace, the Museum of Military History, Traungasse, Lagergasse, Buchfeldgasse, de:Florianigasse, Schulhof, Kirche am Hof, Franziskanerkirche, Michaelerkirche, de:Palais Collalto, Kartäuse Mauerbach (monastery) and the Franzensburg in Lower Austria.

Filming of Series 3 was split between Budapest (including the Párisi Udvar Hotel and the Vígszínház Theatre, Bedo House, Postal Museum, the National Museum of Hungary and the Hazai Bank) and Vienna (including the Loos House, Belvedere, de:Dr.-Ignaz-Seipel-Platz, Jesuitengasse, Michaelerplatz and the Hofburg).

== Broadcast ==
The first series of three 90-minute episodes was broadcast in the United Kingdom on BBC Two between 18 November and 2 December 2019. Austrian channel ORF 2 aired the show beginning 20 December 2019 with dubbing.

In the United States, PBS showed the series in six 45-minute episodes; broadcast began on 19 January 2020.

== Reception ==
The first series of Vienna Blood received a 53% critics rating on Rotten Tomatoes, with the ‘Critics Consensus’ reading, 'Though it rarely rises above 'watchable', fans of period crime series may enjoy passing time with Vienna Blood's charismatic cast anyway.' Meanwhile, the program's average popcornmeter is 88%. The Guardian's Emine Saner, giving three out of five stars to the first episode, remarked that the series was similar to Thompson's prior work on Sherlock, particularly in its leads' dynamic and the presentation. However she did praise the two lead actors. Sean O'Grady of The Independent gave it five out of five stars, praising the direction, recreation of the period and storytelling.

== See also ==
- Freud (TV series), a fictional Sigmund Freud solves murders
- The Alienist (TV series), an 1890s psychiatrist solves murders with his associates

== Bibliography ==
- PBS (10 February 2022). "The Real History Behind 'Vienna Blood'". PBS Interactive: Playlist - drama.
- Brownlow, Max (9 January 2023). "Vienna Blood film locations". Visiting Vienna.
- Martin, Laura (27 May 2020). "Where was Vienna Blood filmed? Filming locations in Austria for BBC Two drama series". inews: Culture - Television.
- BBC (1 December 2022). "Vienna Blood series 3 - Meet the cast and creatives and discover the filming locations". BBC Media Centre.
- Kamble, Sonika (17 January 2023). "Where Was Vienna Blood Filmed?". TheGridNet:The Budapest Grid.
