= Bonn (TV series) =

2023 German television series

- Genre: Thriller; Historical drama
- Based on: An idea by Gerrit Hermans
- Written by: Claudia Garde; Martin Rehbock; Peter Furrer
- Directed by: Claudia Garde
- Starring: Mercedes Müller; Max Riemelt; Sebastian Blomberg; Martin Wuttke; Jürgen Maurer; Katharina Marie Schubert
- Theme music composer: Florian Tessloff
- Country of origin: Germany
- Original languages: German; Russian; Yiddish; English
- No. of seasons: 1
- No. of episodes: 6

Production
- Producers: Philip Voges; Fabian Winkelmann
- Running time: 45 minutes
- Production companies: Odeon Fiction; WDR; ARD

Original release
- Network: Das Erste
- Release: 17 January 2023 – present

Bonn (German: Bonn – Alte Freunde, neue Feinde; lit. "Bonn – Old friends, new enemies") is a six-part German political thriller TV series released in January 2023, directed by Claudia Garde, who is also lead writer. Set in the Federal Republic of Germany in the aftermath of World War II in the 1950s, the series stars Mercedes Müller in the lead role as the young woman Toni. The cast includes Max Riemelt, Sebastian Blomberg, Martin Wuttke, Juergen Maurer, Johanna Gastdorf and Christian Harting.

== Synopsis ==
The story is based on true events. Bonn was the capital of West Germany after the war, and it was in this city that two German secret services, the Federal Office for the Protection of the Constitution (headed by Otto John) and the Gehlen Organization (headed by Reinhard Gehlen ) held meetings. The latter included former Nazis, who tried to wield political influence as well as mobilising a secret army as defence against Russia. It is held that German chancellor Konrad Adenauer knew about the aims of the Gehlen Organization but helped to keep it secret, thus facilitating the integration of its members into post-war Germany.

Set in 1954, Toni, a young woman who has spent a year as an au pair in England, returns to her family in Germany and starts working as a translating secretary at the Gehlen Organization, before being approached by the other secret service and asked to work as a secret agent for them.

== Cast ==
- Mercedes Müller as Toni Schmidt
- Jürgen Maurer as Toni's father, Gerd Schmidt
- Luise von Finckh as Ingrid Schmidt
- Katharina Marie Schubert as Else Schmidt
- Max Riemelt as Wolfgang Berns
- Sebastian Blomberg as Otto John
- Inga Busch as Lucie John
- Martin Wuttke as Reinhard Gehlen
- Sascha Nathan
- Johanna Gastdorf as Ursula
- Carl Achleitner
- Dirk Ossig
- Christian Harting as Noah Berret
- Maike Elena Schmidt
- Julius Feldmeier as Hartmut Redlich
- André Eisermann as Alois Brunner

== Production ==
The story is based on an idea by Gerrit Hermans, with the screenplay written by Claudia Garde, along with Martin Rehbock and Peter Furrer. Garde also directs the six-part series. The dialogue is mainly in German. The music was composed by Florian Tessloff, and Andreas Köhler was cinematographer.

The series is produced by Philip Voges and Fabian Winkelmann of Odeon Fiction, a Leonine Studios company, in co-production with German broadcaster WDR, who commissioned the series, and Wilma Film for ARD. Leonine is responsible for international sales of Bonn.

Filming took place on locations in the Czech Republic and North Rhine-Westphalia, wrapping in July 2021.

== Release ==
The series premiered on German public network Das Erste. It was shown in double episodes on 17, 18, and 24 January 2023 at prime time. All episodes were made available via the ARD Mediathek (ARD media library) from 11 January.

In addition, a documentary entitled Alte Freunde, neue Feinde – Die Doku ("Old Friends, New Enemies – The Documentary"), along with two other documentary shorts on the period, were available in ARD Mediathek.

The series became available on Netflix on 25 July 2023, and was streamed on SBS On Demand by public broadcaster SBS Television in Australia from 20 September 2023.

== Reception ==
The series was well-reviewed in Germany.
