= Hans John =

German resistance member

Hans John (31 August 1911 – 23 April 1945) was a German lawyer and World War II resistance figure.

Hans John was born in Ziegenhain, Hesse, and studied law at the University of Berlin. In 1939, he was hired as a legal assistant at the Aviation Law Institute in Berlin. In June 1940, he was instated into the Wehrmacht, but after suffering a wound at the Eastern Front, he was released back into academics.

With his brother Otto, John was in contact with the resistance elements within the Abwehr and Oberkommando der Wehrmacht. After hearing about Operation Walküre, the brothers joined the resistance, and became heavily involved in the 20 July Plot to kill Hitler. After Hans Oster and Hans von Dohnanyi were arrested in the spring of 1943, they kept the escaped Ludwig Gehre hiding from the Gestapo.

John was arrested in August 1944 on plotting charges, and was severely mistreated in jail. The People's Court sentenced him to death in February 1945. He was shot in April 1945 by members of the SS-Sonderkommando, near Berlin's RSHA office. His brother, Otto, managed to escape Germany in July 1944.

== Sources ==
- August Schnell et al.: Die Abiturienten des Realgymnasiums. In: 100 Jahre Staatliches Gymnasium und Realgymnasium Wiesbaden, Wiesbaden 1951, pp. 167 ff., 178
- Johannes Tuchel,: "... und ihrer aller wartete der Strick." Das Zellengefängnis Lehrter Straße 3 nach dem 20. Juli 1944. Lukas Verlag, Berlin 2014, ISBN 9783867321785, pp. 185–266
