= Guten Morgen, Herr Grothe =

2007 TV Movie by Lars Kraume

- Written by: Beate Langmack
- Directed by: Lars Kraume
- Starring: Sebastian Blomberg
- Country of origin: Germany
- Original language: German

Production
- Producer: Heike Richter-Karst

Original release
- Release: 2007

Guten Morgen, Herr Grothe (lit. 'Good Morning, Mr. Grothe' is a 2007 German television film directed by Lars Kraume.

== Plot ==
Michael Grothe is a dedicated teacher at a troubled secondary school in Berlin who refuses to give up on his disadvantaged students. He takes a special interest in Nico, an aggressive teenager abandoned by the school staff. In his obsessive attempt to save Nico, Grothe repeatedly crosses professional boundaries, ultimately destroying his relationship with his colleague Lisa Kranz. Despite his total commitment, Grothe fails to prevent Nico's downward spiral.

== Cast ==
- Sebastian Blomberg as Michael Grothe
- Ludwig Trepte as Nico
- Nina Kunzendorf as Lisa Kranz
- Mehmed-Azad Subaşı as Emran
- Jacob Lemberg as Lars
- Ngoc Tu Nguyen as Duc
- Esra Kanaat as Sebiya
- Safak-Sirin Agdasan as Büsra
- Steffi Kühnert as Mrs. Brock (Nico's mother)
- Nele Mueller-Stöfen as Sibylle Grothe
- Patrick Güldenberg as Trainee Teacher
- Gideon Finimento as Ruben Grothe

== Awards ==
- 2008 Adolf Grimme Award (Best Fiction)
- 2008 Monte-Carlo Television Festival – Golden Nymph for Best Screenplay (Beate Langmaack)
