= Perfume (2018 TV series) =

- Parfum
- Genre: Drama
- Directed by: Philipp Kadelbach
- Original language: German
- No. of seasons: 1
- No. of episodes: 6

Production
- Producers: Oliver Berben, Sarah Kirkegaard
- Cinematography: Jakub Bejnarowicz
- Editor: Bernd Schlegel
- Camera setup: Single-camera
- Production companies: Constantin Film; MOOVIE GmbH

Original release
- Network: ZDFneo (Germany); Netflix (international)

Perfume (German: Parfum) is a German television drama series produced for ZDFneo that was released on November 14, 2018. The series is both inspired by the novel of the same name by Patrick Süskind and the 2006 film Perfume: The Story of a Murderer by Tom Tykwer but is set in the modern day. Netflix acquired worldwide airing rights outside of German-speaking Europe for the crime series. The series was released on Netflix on December 21, 2018. In general, the international reviews have been very positive.

== Plot ==
On the Lower Rhine, the corpse of a woman is found whose red hair, pubic, and armpit hair have been removed. The investigators Nadja Simon and Matthias Köhler and prosecutor Grünberg, with whom Nadja has an affair, encounter five former boarding school students who know the victim from their school days and experimented with human scents back then, inspired by the novel Perfume. In addition, the unresolved case of a missing boy comes into focus. When his body is found, he has the same mutilations as the red-haired victim. A prostitute is also found murdered, disfigured in the same way. Meanwhile, Nadja learns that she is pregnant by Grünberg. He is not ready to leave his wife, and he wants her to obtain an abortion. When his mistress refuses to end her pregnancy, however, he ends the relationship with her.

== Cast ==
Actor	Role	Episodes	Season
Friederike Becht	Nadja Simon	1–	1
Wotan Wilke Möhring	Prosecutor Grünberg	1–	1
Juergen Maurer	Matthias Köhler	1–	1
August Diehl	Moritz de Vries	1–	1
Ken Duken	Roman Seliger	1–	1
Natalia Belitski	Elena Seliger	1–	1
Christian Friedel	Daniel "Zahnlos" ("Toothless") Sluiter	1–	1
Trystan Pütter	Thomas Butsche	1–	1
Marc Hosemann	Jens Brettschneider	1–	1
Anja Schneider	Elisabeth Grünberg	1-	1
Oskar Belton	Roman (young)	1–	1
Valerie Stoll	Elena (young)	1–	1
Franziska Brandmeier	Katharina (young)	1–	1
Albrecht Felsmann	Daniel ("Toothless") Sluiter (young)	1–	1
Leon Blaschke	Moritz (young)	1–	1
Julius Nitschkoff	Thomas Butsche (young)	1–	1
Carlotta von Falkenhayn	Elsie	1–	1
Susanne Wuest	Lydia Suchanow (psychiatrist)	1–	1
Karl Markovics	Elena's Father	1–	1
Roxane Duran	Ballerina	1	1
Thomas Thieme	Internatsleiter	1–	1
Siri Nase	Katharina ("K") Läufer	1	1

== Episodes ==
No. overall	Title	Directed by	Written by	Original release date	Netflix release date
1	"Ambra" "Ambergris"	Philipp Kadelbach	Eva Kranenburg	November 14, 2018	December 21, 2018
2	"Skatol" "Skatole"	Philipp Kadelbach	Eva Kranenburg	November 14, 2018	December 21, 2018
3	"Synthese" "Synthesis"	Philipp Kadelbach	Eva Kranenburg	November 21, 2018	December 21, 2018
4	"Die dritte Substanz" "The Third Substance"	Philipp Kadelbach	Eva Kranenburg	November 21, 2018	December 21, 2018
5	"Herzakkord" "The Heart Notes"	Philipp Kadelbach	Eva Kranenburg	November 28, 2018	December 21, 2018
6	"Fesselung" "Captivation"	Philipp Kadelbach	Eva Kranenburg	November 28, 2018	December 21, 2018
