= Robert Finster =

Austrian actor

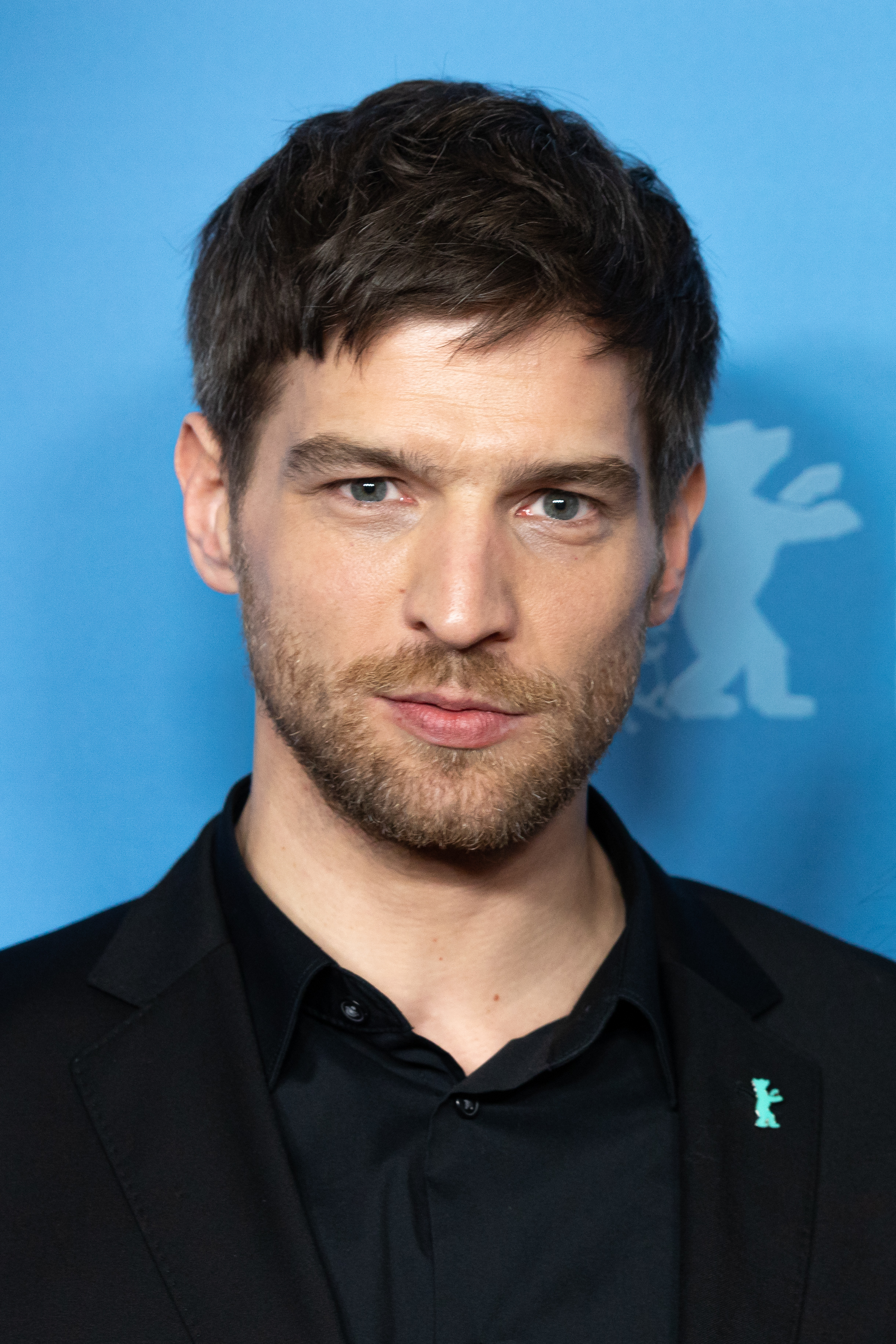
- Born: 10 March 1984 (age 42); Bruck an der Mur, Austria
- Citizenship: Austrian
- Education: University of Music and Performing Arts Vienna
- Occupation: Actor
- Years active: 2011-present
- Known for: Freud, Tribes of Europa

Robert Finster (born 10 March 1984) is an Austrian actor. He's mostly known for playing Sigmund Freud in Freud.

== Biography ==
Robert Finster was born to musicians and grew up in Graz. As a child he learned violin and choral singing, later he was a member of the cabaret group Andritzer Treffpünkte and worked independently in the telecommunications industry in field service. Initially he wanted to study acting in Graz, but he didn't pass the selection there. From 2007 he studied acting at the Max Reinhardt Seminar in Vienna, graduating in 2011.

At the Reichenau Festival he appeared in Fräulein Else in 2011 and in Stefan Zweig's Ungeduld des Herzens in 2012, and from 2011 on he worked at the Vorarlberg State Theatre, starring in Tartuffe, Die verzauberten Brüder, Mutter Courage and Ronja Räubertochter. In 2012, at the Theater am Lend in Graz he was on stage with Cafe deja vu, and he participated in Das Maß der Dinge by Neil LaBute at the Garage X Theater Petersplatz in 2014. In 2015 he worked at the Bosnian National Theatre Zenica in Balkan Requiem, and was also seen at the Vienna Lustspielhaus as Hamlet directed by Adi Hirschal, and played with the Aktionstheater Ensemble in Angry Joung Men and Kein Stück über Syrien.

In the 2014 movie Hüter meines Bruders he played the role of Pietschi Mordelt, he then played Karl Hoeller in the 2016 film Stefan Zweig: Farewell to Europe. In 2017 he appeared in the ORF/ARD television film Dennstein & Schwarz - Sterben macht Erben and the ORF TV series Walking on Sunshine.

In 2020 Finster had his breakthrough role when he was cast as Sigmund Freud in the Netflix's show Freud. Since the season 2019/20 he is an ensemble member at the Schauspielhaus Graz. Finster then played Crimson Commander David Vossin in Netflix's Tribes of Europa in 2021

== Filmography ==
- 2011: Wie man leben soll
- 2012: Vier Frauen und ein Todesfall – Notlügen
- 2013: CopStories – Bist du deppert
- 2014: Hüter meines Bruders
- 2014: Boͤsterreich (TV series, one episode)
- 2016: Die Hochzeit (short film)
- 2016: Kästner und der kleine Dienstag
- 2016: Stefan Zweig: Farewell to Europe
- 2017: Krieg
- 2018: Dennstein & Schwarz – Sterben macht Erben
- 2018: SOKO Donau – Tod im Taxi
- 2019: Walking on Sunshine
- 2019: Kaviar
- 2019: SOKO Kitzbühel – Alleingelassen
- 2020: Freud (Fernsehserie)
- 2020: Die Toten vom Bodensee – Der Wegspuk (TV series)
- 2021: Tribes of Europa (TV series)
- 2021: Prey
- 2021: Mord in der Familie – Der Zauberwürfel (TV movie)
- 2024: Crooks (TV series)
- 2024: SOKO Linz – Das Phantom (TV series)
