= A Double Life (1954 film) =

- French release poster
- Directed by: Victor Vicas
- Written by: Jean Giraudoux (play); Frédéric Grendel; Victor Vicas; Dieter Werner; Franz Zimmermann
- Produced by: Gilbert de Goldschmidt; Charles Münzel; Stuart Schulberg
- Starring: Michel Auclair; Simone Simon; Barbara Rütting
- Cinematography: André Bac
- Edited by: Georges Klotz; Ira Oberberg
- Music by: Hans-Martin Majewski
- Production companies: Hamster Productions; Madeleine Films; Trans-Rhein Film
- Distributed by: Columbia Film
- Release date: 12 November 1954
- Running time: 90 minutes
- Countries: France; West Germany
- Language: German

A Double Life or Double Destiny (French: Double destin, German: Das zweite Leben) is a 1954 French-West German drama film based upon the play Siegfried (1928) by Jean Giraudoux, directed by Victor Vicas and starring Michel Auclair, Simone Simon and Barbara Rütting. It was shot at the Wiesbaden Studios in Hesse and on location around Paris and Kiedrich in the Rhineland. The film's sets were designed by the art directors Alfred Bütow and Ernst Schomer.

== Cast ==
- Michel Auclair as Jacques Frontenac
- Simone Simon as Françoise Dunoyer
- Barbara Rütting as Sybil
- Bernhard Wicki as Rainer von Hohenburg
- Yves Brainville as Garreau
- Gert Fröbe as Mittelmeier
- Rolf von Nauckhoff as Professeur Werner
- Walter Clemens as L'Italien
- Georges Vitray as Gervais
- Herbert von Boxberger
- Otto Friebel
- Marcel Rouzé
- Yvonne Yma
- Elisabeth Scherer

== Bibliography ==
- Goble, Alan. The Complete Index to Literary Sources in Film. Walter de Gruyter, 1999.
