= Elisabeth Scherer =

German actress

- Born: 30 July 1914; Cologne, Germany
- Died: 18 April 2013 (aged 98); Cologne, Germany
- Occupation: Actress
- Years active: 1942–2009

Elisabeth Scherer (30 July 1914 – 18 April 2013) was a German actress. She appeared in more than 30 films and television shows between 1942 and 2009.

== Selected filmography ==
- Doctor Crippen (1942)
- A Double Life (1954)
- Now or Never: Time Is Money (2000)
- Mädchen, Mädchen (2001)
- 4 Freunde und 4 Pfoten (2004)
