= Johanna Gastdorf =

German actress

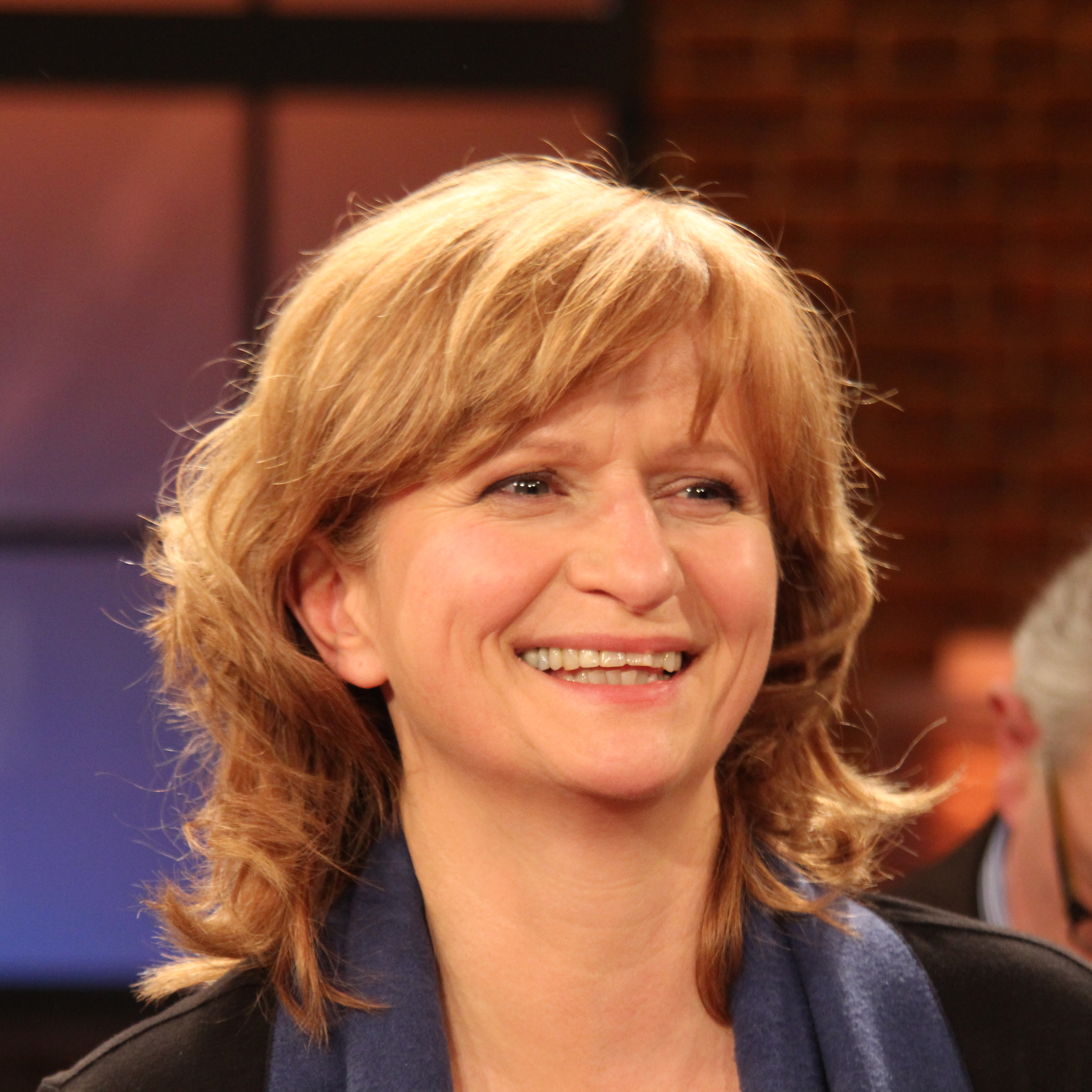
- Johanna Gastdorf in 2012
- Born: 17 March 1959 (age 67); Hamburg, West Germany
- Occupation: Actress
- Years active: 1993–present

Johanna Gastdorf (born 17 March 1959) is a German actress. She has appeared in many German films and television shows since 1993. Recent roles include Irene in Class Reunion 2.0 – The Wedding (Die Hochzeit; 2019) and Ursula in the 2023 political drama series Bonn – Alte Freunde, neue Feinde.

== Early life and education ==
Johanna Gastdorf was born on 17 March 1959 in Hamburg, West Germany.

== Career ==
Gastdorf's first acting role was in Ein guter Schritt, Böses zu tun, in 1984.

In 2008, she starred in The Wave, and she is also known for her role as Irene in the 2020 film Class Reunion 2.0 – The Wedding (Die Hochzeit).

In 2023 she played Ursula in the TV series Bonn – Alte Freunde, neue Feinde, a political drama set in post-war West Germany in 1954.

== Filmography ==
Year	Title	Role	Notes
1995	Küß mich!	Regisseurin	
1995	Bunte Hunde	Staatsanwältin	
1998	Four for Venice	Nick's secretary	
2001	Heart	Marlies Bode	
2003	The Miracle of Bern	Christa Lubanski	
2004	Off Beat	Mutter des Mädchens	
2005	Sophie Scholl – The Final Days	Else Gebel	
2007	Neandertal	Guido's Mother	
2007	Cold Summer	Renate Sawatzke	TV film
2007	The Unpolished	Dr. Irm Branzger	
2007	Herr Bello	Huhn	
2008	The Wave	Mutter Tim	
2009	Hilde	Frieda Knef	
2011	Eine Insel namens Udo	Frau Weber	
2012	Glory: A Tale of Mistaken Identities	Elke Ebling	
2014	The Chosen Ones	Petra Grust	TV film
2016	24 Weeks	Beate, Astrid's mother	
2016	Fritz Lang	Thea von Harbou	
2016	Rivals Forever: The Sneaker Battle	Pauline Dassler	TV film
2018	Never Look Away	Großmutter Malvine	
2019	Die Goldfische	Olivers Mutter	
2019	Die Hochzeit	Irene	
2023	Bonn – Alte Freunde, neue Feinde	Ursula	
