= Fever (2014 film) =

2014 film

- Directed by: Elfi Mikesch
- Written by: Elfi Mikesch
- Starring: Eva Mattes; Martin Wuttke
- Release date: 11 February 2014 (Berlin)
- Running time: 80 minutes
- Countries: Luxembourg; Austria
- Languages: German; French

Fever (German: Fieber) is a 2014 drama film directed by Elfi Mikesch and produced by Amour Fou. The film was shot in Luxembourg, Austria, Italy and Serbia and had its world premiere in the Panorama section of the 64th Berlin International Film Festival. The film is set in Austria in the early 1950s.

== Synopsis ==
A photographer is haunted by memories from his childhood and goes through the old photos of his plagued dad to find some kind of redemption.

== Cast ==
- Eva Mattes as Franziska
- Martin Wuttke as Vater
- Carolina Cardoso as Franzi
- Nicole Max as Mutter
- Sascha Ley as Madame Marguérite
- Nilton Martins as Berber Tilelli
