= Mercedes Müller =

German actress

Nicole Mercedes Mariola Müller (born 4 November 1996 in Berlin) is a German actress and former champion kickboxer. She is known for her role as Isa Schmidt in the 2016 film Goodbye Berlin and her role in the TV series Tannbach.

== Early life and education ==
Nicole Mercedes Mariola Müller was born to a German father and Polish mother. Her middle name "Mariola" is her mother's name. She was acting by age four, and debuted with her older brother Kai Michael Müller in the German children's adventure film 4 Freunde und 4 Pfoten in 2003.

Müller competed as a kickboxer in her teen years. She was the German female champion for 2010, 2011, and 2012, as well as the International German female champion. She also won a bronze medal at a world championship competition in 2010.

== Career ==
Müller had roles in episodes of popular German TV series, including Polizeiruf 110 and Tatort, as well as in films.

In 2006, she started playing the role of Paula Bergmann on the German telenovela Wege zum Glück.

She played Isa Schmidt in Goodbye Berlin (2016) (German title Tschick).

Among other TV appearances, she has been on the German crime series Der Irland-Krimi since its debut in 2019, and appeared on the 2020 Austrian-German crime series Freud.

In 2023 she played the lead role as Toni Schmidt in the TV series Bonn – Alte Freunde, neue Feinde, a political drama set in post-war West Germany in 1954.

== Select filmography ==
- 4 Freunde und 4 Pfoten (2003)

== Awards and nominations ==
Müller earned a nomination for the German Actor Award for best young actor in 2017.

She was also nominated for the Studio Hamburg best young actress award in 2018 for her role on the German series Tannbach (broadcast as Line of Separation in the United States).
