= Katharina Marie Schubert =

German actress

- Born: 22 January 1977 (age 48); Gifhorn, Germany
- Education: Max Reinhardt Seminar
- Occupation: Actress
- Years active: 2001–present
- Awards: Bayerischer Filmpreis (2015)

Katharina Marie Schubert (born 22 January 1977, Gifhorn) is a German actress of Austrian descent.

== Early life and education ==
Katharina Marie Schubert grew up in Braunschweig, Germany.

She studied acting at the Max Reinhardt Seminar in Vienna, Austria, and during this time debuted at the Wiener Festwochen in a play by Botho Strauß. She subsequently became part of the ensemble of the Burgtheater in Vienna.

== Career ==
From 2001 until 2008 Schubert belonged to the ensemble of the Münchner Kammerspiele, performing in various roles under the direction of Andreas Kriegenburg, Stefan Pucher, Johan Simons, René Pollesch, Alvis Hermanis, and Thomas Ostermeier. With Anton Chekhov's play Three Sisters and Shakespeare's The Tempest, she was invited to the Berliner Theatertreffen, which showcases the most important theatre productions from the German-speaking world.

In 2010, Schubert joined the ensemble of the Deutsches Theater Berlin in Berlin.

Apart from working in theatre, Schubert has starred in various productions for television and film. In 2015, she portrayed an unemployed actress in Oliver Haffner's comedy drama A Godsend.

Her own two short films Wabosch Wilma (2009) and Another fucking... (2011) both premiered at the Hof International Film Festival.

In 2023 she played Else Schmidt in the TV series Bonn – Alte Freunde, neue Feinde, a political drama set in post-war West Germany in 1954.

== Other activities ==
In 2011 Schubert was a jury member at the Montreal World Film Festival.

== Awards and nominations ==
- 2015: Winner, Bayerischer Filmpreis, for A Godsend
- 2015: Nominated, Best Actress for the Deutscher Filmpreis, for A Godsend
