= BRG Klagenfurt-Viktring =

Coordinates: 46.5897°N 14.2692°E

The BRG Klagenfurt-Viktring is a Bundesrealgymnasium in the 13th district of Klagenfurt (Viktring), Austria. Emphasis is placed on the musical education and in art education. In addition, there is also a branch with emphasis on science; this branch is also accessible to children whose residence lies outside of the 13th district of Klagenfurt, since the school year of 2007/08. The school is visited by approx. 1000 pupils. The majority travels each day by bus from all parts of Carinthia in order to receive an education with emphasis on music or the arts. The school building is a former monastery surrounded by a park, with ponds and some trees. There is also a church on the school grounds and a former Praelatur.

== Emphasis ==
In the 11th grade the pupils choose between physics and biology or geometrical drawing as major subject. In the fifth grade the pupils can choose between the languages Italian, French and Latin. Since the school year 2001/2002 computer science is taught including new media. Two weekly hours computer science are taught from third to the fifth grade.
