= Martin Wuttke =

German actor and director

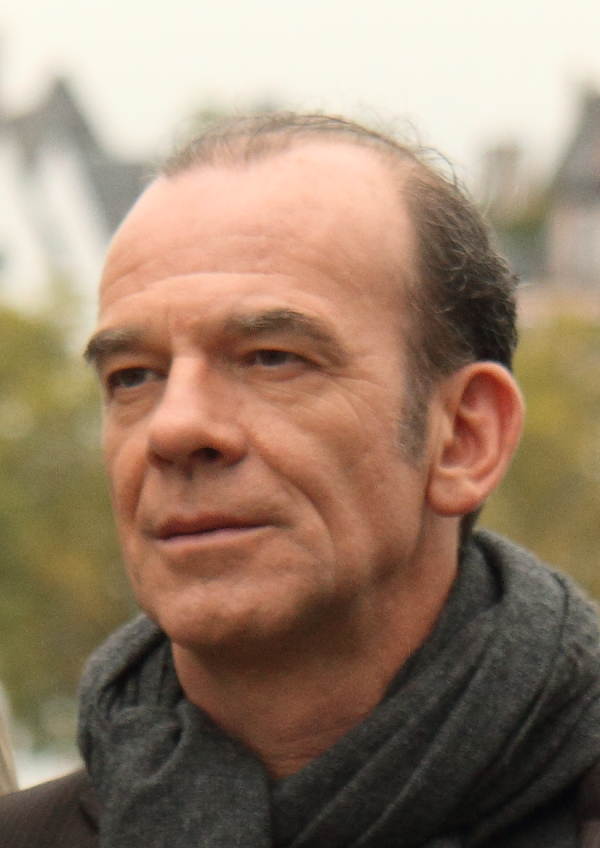
- Wuttke in 2011
- Born: 8 February 1962 (age 64); Gelsenkirchen, West Germany
- Occupations: Actor; director
- Years active: 1991–present

Martin Wuttke (born 8 February 1962) is a German actor and director. He has performed on many stages in the German-speaking theatre world, as well as in numerous films and TV series. He achieved international recognition for his portrayal of Adolf Hitler in the 2009 film Inglourious Basterds, which won him the Screen Actors Guild Award for Outstanding Performance by a Cast in a Motion Picture, shared with the ensemble cast.

== Early life and education ==
Wuttke began his actor training at the college theatre in Bochum, before switching to the Westfälische Schauspielschule Bochum (later renamed Schauspielschule Bochum).

== Career ==
Wuttke has performed on numerous German-speaking stages: Volksbühne am Rosa-Luxemburg-Platz Berlin, Berliner Ensemble, Schaubühne am Lehniner Platz, Schiller Theater in Berlin, Deutsches Theater Berlin, Deutsches Schauspielhaus Hamburg, Theater des Westens Berlin, the Thalia Theater of Hamburg, Stuttgart State Theater, Freie Volksbühne Berlin, Schauspiel Frankfurt am Main, and Schauspielhaus Zürich in Switzerland.

When the Berliner Ensemble performed at the United States in 1999, Wuttke portrayed Hitler as a petty Chicago gangster in Heiner Müller's adaptation of Brecht's The Resistible Rise of Arturo Ui, in a performance praised by critics.

In 2009 Wuttke was appointed director of the Burgtheater in Vienna, Austria, where he also became a member of the ensemble.

He has also starred in many films, achieving international recognition for his portrayal of Adolf Hitler in the 2009 film Inglourious Basterds, and German TV series, notably Babylon Berlin from 2020 to 2022.

In 2023 he played Reinhard Gehlen in Bonn – Alte Freunde, neue Feinde, a political drama set in post-war West Germany in 1954.

== Filmography ==
=== Films ===
Year	Film	Role	Notes
2000	No Place to Go	Fast food seller	
2002	Delusion	Robert Bergmann	
2003	Rosenstrasse	Joseph Goebbels	
2003	Hamlet X	Claudius	
2006	Call Me Agostino	Agostino Stone	
2006	Detektive oder Die glücklosen Engel der inneren Sicherheit		
2007	Silent Resident	Hauks	
2008	Delta		
2009	Inglourious Basterds	Adolf Hitler	
2011	Hanna	Knepfler	
2012	Cloud Atlas	Mr. Boerhaave/Guard/Leary the Healer	
2014	A Most Wanted Man		
2014	Fever		
2015	Colonia Dignidad		
2016	The Duelist	German Baron	
2019	A Hidden Life		
2020	Berlin Alexanderplatz		

=== Television ===
Year	Film	Role	Notes
1991	Moskau – Petuschki	Jerofejev Venedikt	
1997	Die Bernauerin	Mönch	
1998–2015	Tatort	Andreas Keppler	21 episodes
1998	Geiselfahrt ins Paradies		
2000	Dämonen	Nikolai Wsewolodowitsch Stawrogin	
2000	Bella Block	Wolfgang Krauss	1 episode
2001	Hand in Hand	Peter Plachotny	
2002	Liebesau – die andere Heimat	Schorsch Schönstein	3 episodes
2006	Die Tote vom Deich	Manuel Bove	
2013	George	Joseph Goebbels	
2015	Homeland	BND officer Adler	
2016–2017	Sense8	Volker Bohm	
2017	Maximilian	Ulrich Fugger the Elder	TV miniseries
2020—2022	Babylon Berlin	Gustav Heymann	14 episodes
2023	Bonn – Alte Freunde, neue Feinde	Reinhard Gehlen	TV miniseries

== Awards ==
- Screen Actors Guild Award for Outstanding Performance by a Cast in a Motion Picture -Inglourious Basterds – Won
