= Sebastian Blomberg =

German actor

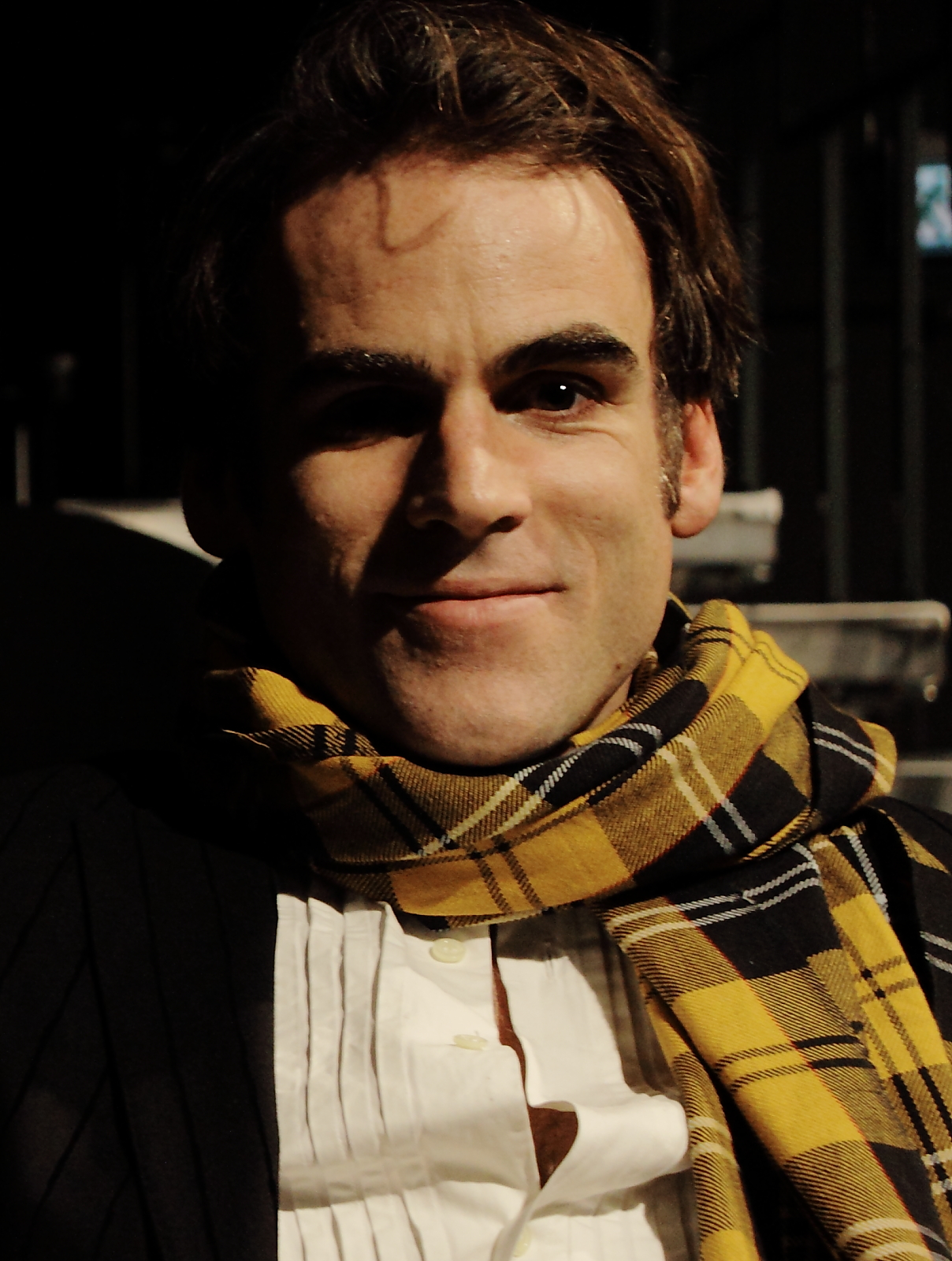
- Sebastian Blomberg in 2010
- Born: 24 May 1972 (age 54); Bergisch Gladbach, West Germany
- Occupation: Actor
- Years active: 1998-present

Sebastian Blomberg, Sebastian von Blomberg (May 24, 1972 in Bergisch Gladbach) is a German actor. He is known for his role as Rudi Dutschke in the 2008 film The Baader Meinhof Complex.

== Early life and education ==
Sebastian Blomberg was born in Bergisch Gladbach, West Germany.. He was educated at the private boarding school Schule Schloss Salem, where he obtained the Abitur, Germany's university entrance qualification.

== Career ==
Blomberg has appeared in many films since 1998.

In 2008 he played Rudi Dutschke in The Baader Meinhof Complex.

He played in Tatort from 2018 to 2023 character Martin Rascher.

In 2023 he played Otto John in Bonn – Alte Freunde, neue Feinde, a political drama set in post-war West Germany in 1954.

== Selected filmography ==
Year	Title	Role	Notes
1998	Dunckel	Tommy Dunckel	TV movie
2000	Anatomy	Caspar	
2001	What to Do in Case of Fire?	Maik	
2002	Olgas Sommer		
2002	I'm the Father	Marco Krieger	
2004	Alles auf Zucker!		
2005	Three Degrees Colder	Jan Engel	
2007	Guten Morgen Herr Grothe		
2008	The Baader Meinhof Complex	Rudi Dutschke	
2008	10 Sekunden		
2010	The Silence		
2011	If Not Us, Who?		
2012	Die Männer der Emden		
2012	Lullaby Ride	Marco	
2014	Age of Cannibals	Kai Niederländer	
2015	The People vs. Fritz Bauer		
2016	Heart of Stone	Löbl	
2016	Couple's Retreat	Thomas Leber	TV movie
2020	Curveball		
2023	Bonn – Alte Freunde, neue Feinde	Otto John	TV miniseries
