= The Kangaroo Chronicles =

Book series by Marc-Uwe Kling

The Kangaroo Chronicles is a book series by the German author, singer-songwriter and Kabarett artist Marc-Uwe Kling, detailing his fictional adventures at the side of his irreverent flatmate, a Communist kangaroo. Structured as anthologies of loosely connected, humorous short stories, and featuring a large cast of recurring characters, the material draws equally on anti-capitalist social critiques and relatable absurdities of everyday life in contemporary Berlin.

The series was a great commercial success in Germany, particularly the audiobooks, read and performed by the author, with the first volume also having been translated into English, French, Dutch, Danish, Swedish, and Korean. The first book in the series, Die Känguru-Chroniken (en: The Kangaroo Chronicles), was published in 2009, followed by Das Känguru-Manifest (en: The Kangaroo Manifesto, 2011); Die Känguru-Offenbarung (en: The Kangaroo Revelations, 2014); and Die Känguru-Apokryphen (en: The Kangaroo Apocrypha, 2018).

The Kangaroo has also appeared in other media. Before the publication of the first volume, the initial stories were broadcast as a weekly radio podcast Neues vom Känguru (en: News from the Kangaroo), on Fritz, a Berlin-based radio station, starting in 2008. The show was awarded the German Radio Prize for "Best Comedy" in 2010. Episodes started being made available on a dedicated YouTube channel in early 2020, under the title "Neues vom Känguru reloaded". A film adaptation by ZDF and X Filme was released in 2020, followed by a sequel in 2022.

== Plot ==
=== Die Känguru Chroniken (The Kangaroo Chronicles) ===
The story opens as first-person narrator Marc-Uwe—a self-reflective, ironically disposed, twenty-something bohemian and former philosophy student who earns a living as a Kabarett artist—answers his door to a talking kangaroo. It introduces itself as his new neighbour and asks to borrow some eggs to make pancakes, having forgotten to buy any. No sooner has the flabbergasted narrator handed it some eggs and closed the door that the Kangaroo rings again, now asking to also borrow, salt, milk, flour, oil, and a pan. It also transpires that it does not yet have a stove, so Marc-Uwe invites the animal into his kitchen to make pancakes. Shortly thereafter the brash Kangaroo moves in with him entirely, without asking permission, and the two become flatmates. It refuses to pay rent or pursue stable employment, brusquely declaring "I'm a Communist. Got something against that?", so the narrator becomes responsible for the Kangaroo's livelihood.

Thus begins the story of a deep friendship, characterised by much bickering over topics ranging from media and linguistic criticism, to capitalism, questions of life and faith, contemporary protest culture, Karl Marx, Bertolt Brecht, the Red Army Faction and the Viet Cong. The character's adventures are related through a series of interconnected, but self-contained, short stories which are mostly set in Berlin and occasionally make mention of concrete geographical locations, such as Berlin-Kreuzberg or the underground station Kottbusser Tor. Towards the end of the book, Marc-Uwe and the Kangaroo encounter their new neighbour, a Penguin. He introduces himself as a salesman for frozen food but the two protagonists are immediately suspicious, which sets the Penguin up as a Capitalist antagonist to the Kangaroo for subsequent books.

=== Das Känguru Manifest (The Kangaroo Manifesto) ===
The book picks up where the first volume left off. The reader learns of the fictional Ministerium für Produktivität (en: Ministry for Productivity), which has plans to crack down on unemployment by introducing the Initiative für mehr Arbeit (en: Initiative for More Labour). Meanwhile, a personal rivalry develops between the Kangaroo and the Penguin next door. For example, the Kangaroo, an avid boxer, contrives to install its punching bag so it keeps bumping into their shared wall when in use. In return, the Penguin places several alarm clocks against the wall, in order to wake the Kangaroo at what it considers ungodly hours. Marc-Uwe's editor suggests to the Kangaroo that the Penguin is its archenemy, fighting to advance a kapitalistischer Weltverschlechterungsplan (en: capitalist Plot to Screw Up the World).

At a writers' awards ceremony—which the protagonists attend as nominees in the category "Best Book Featuring a Talking Animal"—Marc-Uwe and the Kangaroo meet Jörg and Jörn Dwigs: twin brothers and founders of the right-wing populist party Sicherheit und Verantwortung (SV; en: Safety and Responsibility). Their encounter inspires the Kangaroo to found the Asoziales Netzwerk (en: The Antisocial Network) – an underground resistance group that commits "anti-terror attacks" aimed at "The System." The SV goes on to be elected to parliament the following elections and the Ministry for Productivity begins implementing a policy categorising immigrants into productive and unproductive. This is despite the Antisocial Network's fervent efforts at sabotage, which go so far as breaking into the Ministry's server rooms to physically destroy the immigrant database. At the close of the book, the Kangaroo—convinced the Penguin is secretly pulling the strings behind the whole campaign—is categorised as unproductive and deported.

Where The Chronicles revolved mainly around realist depictions of everyday life in Berlin—with the exception of the talking Kangaroo—, in The Manifesto, Kling first begins to develop an overarching plot line, and introduces a number of quasi-realistic organisations and institutions, as well as recurring characters—notably Marc-Uwe's love interest Maria (codenamed Gott (en: God)) and other members of the Antisocial Network. However each short story (chapter) remains intelligible on its own.

=== Die Känguru-Offenbarung (The Kangaroo Revelations) ===
The third volume is divided into two parts – Revelations I and II.

At the beginning of Revelations I, Marc-Uwe has been alone for several months already and is suffering from depression. However, the Kangaroo soon returns. Since it is now an illegal immigrant, it relies on a series of disguises to avoid deportation. The two quickly determine that the Penguin no longer lives in his flat, so they make it their mission to find him. They do not follow a set plan or strategy, preferring simply to look in many different places—but wherever they end up, they seem to have just missed the penguin. At the end of part 1, Marc-Uwe's editor asks for more grandeur, so in Revelations II, the flatmates carry on their search abroad.

Marc-Uwe and the Kangaroo visit New York City, Toronto, Brussels, Seattle and Caracas, then Toronto again, and finally Ho-Chi-Minh City. It turns out that the Anti-Social Network has branched out into regional groups all over the world, and they encounter other members in New York and Toronto. In Ho-Chi-Minh City, Marc-Uwe and the Kangaroo find a factory that is run by the Penguin. To find out what is being manufactured there, they follow the supply chain, eventually reaching an island in the Aegean Sea. The Kangaroo develops the theory that the Penguin and his associates want to turn the whole world into an airport. Marc-Uwe and the Kangaroo find the penguins' headquarters, where it turns out they're raising small penguins. Marc-Uwe and the Kangaroo barely escape the penguins' factory, only making it out with the help of a turncoat penguin. Finally, they make their way to the Outback, where they meet an independent group of kangaroos who are also fighting against "The System" and the penguins.

The Revelations also include an appendix which describes various anti-terror attacks against the Kangaroo's various foes. The final part of this appendix describes the kangaroos' sabotage of the penguins' first airport.

Revelations I is similar to the Manifesto in that its stories remain comprehensible in isolation; the stories in the second part, on the other hand, build upon one another. As the book progresses, its chapters become less and less individually comprehensible. The Revelations incorporate many elements characteristic of Fantasy novels. It also contains various running gags new to the series. For example, every time the protagonists meet someone abroad, it's emphasised again and again what a crazy coincidence it is that the new character just happens to speak German.

=== Die Känguru-Apokryphen (The Kangaroo Apocrypha) ===
The fourth volume was published in October 2018. It is made up of 30 different stories, by and large not organised in chronological order. Nevertheless, some series of interdependent stories, for example those featuring Dietmar Kötke, are told chronologically. Some of the stories are set during the time period of the Chronicles, but others occur even after the end of the Revelations. The Apocrypha also include some stories from earlier volumes, retold from the perspective of the Kangaroo.

== Characters and organisations ==
=== Protagonists ===
==== Narrator ====
The protagonist of the Chronicles is the first-person narrator, Marc-Uwe. He is characterized as an educated, critical, self-reflecting intellectual in his late twenties. Marc-Uwe is a member of the 'Kleinkunstszene' of Berlin (genre of arts including poetry slam, kabarett, and comedy amongst other things). He was born in Baden-Württemberg and now lives in a flat in Berlin. Money is usually tight, this does not change when the Kangaroo moves in, as it does not make any money and has Marc-Uwe pay for everything. Marc-Uwe likes to read his poems to the Kangaroo and tell it about his thoughts, plans and ideas, which the Kangaroo likes to criticize ruthlessly. It is not often that the two are on a par in their debates and discussions, however, the Kangaroo tends to win most discussions as it uses unfair and malicious techniques when debating.

==== The Kangaroo ====
The Kangaroo fought in the Vietnam War on the side of the Viet Cong, according to its statement, and came to the GDR as Vertragsarbeiter (contract worker) with his mother after the war had ended. However, later, it is discovered that it only waved at the last American helicopter as a little baby out of its mother's pouch. It tells the narrator that it's a full-time communist, but files for unemployment later in the text. It is a relentless critic of capitalism and fights for a just world order, bread for all and the ban of the so-called music television (television where music, music videos and information related to music is aired), which is why it founded the "Judeo-Bolshevist world conspiracy association" (original: "Jüdisch-Bolschewistische Weltverschwörung e.V."). But all of these attempts fail naturally because of the insignificance of the Kangaroo in the world's affairs and because of its laziness. Thereby, its critical of capitalism attitude is often counteracted because it's kept by the narrator. In addition to that, it uses the narrator as object for its unfair trade practices (such as forced ringtone subscriptions).

The kangaroo loves booze pralines, schnitzel buns with mince, as well as the band Nirvana and movies with Bud Spencer – preferably without Terence Hill. It is literate, argues radical and consequent, while simultaneously behaving childish, defiant and goatish. It does steal ashtrays whenever it has the opportunity and is occasionally malicious and back-stabbing. In dicey situations though, the kangaroo selflessly assists his roommate. It always carries a ton of stuff in his pouch. Until the kangaroo locates what it precisely needs, it frequently has to search for long time and then pulls out books, bolt cutters, newspapers, stolen ashtrays and lots more. In many cases the red boxing gloves it carries in his pouch come to use, which most of the times are found unerringly.
It is working on a magnum opus, which, according to the Kangaroo, carries the two human main driving forces in its title: "opportunism and repression". The Kangaroo tends to cite smaller passages out of it.

As a fictive character the Kangaroo – even though the author repeatedly mentions the Kangaroo's existence – functions as the author's alter ego, as a being which isn't bound to the common norms of the society. Therefore, it can say and do whatever it wants and what the author would be prohibited from doing. In literature this a known and frequently used stylistic device. It is possible for the Kangaroo to insult officers or kick small dogs out of the way, while naturally discussing their particular aerodynamic characteristics. At a cocktail party, it pees on Jörn Dwigs, the founder of a fictitious right-wing populist party because it decided to take figures of speech literally. The comedy of the Chronicles results from these liberties the Kangaroo takes. Furthermore, the Kangaroo is able to voice unconventional truths, similar to the child in the fairy tale "The Emperor's New Clothes". The Kangaroo is often childish and cunning, sometimes mischievous, but is in the end willing to reconcile with the author, most gladly however after winning an argument.

The Kangaroo has features, which can be interpreted as typically female as well as typically male. That's why the Kangaroo's gender is not clearly definable. Although only female kangaroos have a permanent pouch - and the Kangaroo uses its pouch clichédly as a kind of chaotic handbag in the course of the three books - it suggests that the pouch might be just stapled on in the course of book three. In an interview the author said that the Kangaroo was "bi-trans-metro-sexual".

=== The main character's friends ===
==== Axel Krapotke ====
Krapotke is a somewhat silly young Bundeswehr soldier who appears for the first time in the second part and later joins the Anti-Social Network. He is often excluded from the rest of the group and not rarely brings the Kangaroo to spectacular outbursts of rage, for example because he thinks the rules for Mau Mau are too complicated.

==== Friedrich-Wilhelm and Otto-Von ====
Friedrich-Wilhelm and Otto-Von are two brothers of Turkish descent whose parents, according to Friedrich-Wilhelm, "went a little over the top with their intention to integrate". They are part of the Anti-Social Network founded by the Kangaroo and play a key role in it alongside the Kangaroo and the narrator. Out of the two brothers, Friedrich-Wilhelm features more often in the stories; he studies medicine and finds a girlfriend between the second and third book. They have a son named Bartholomäus. Otto-Von appears mainly in the second book. He runs a small shop called "Snacks and the City", where he initially sells doner kebap and fruit. Later, after a business idea of Otto-Von, he sells solely cheap beer. During the course of the book, his business expands and becomes a chain store.

==== God ====
God is a female member of the Anti-Social Network, which was founded by the Kangaroo. Her true name Maria is first mentioned in the chapter "Swedish Scientists" of the Kangaroo Apocrypha, as well as the fact that she successfully completed her study of arts. However, her code name in the network is often used for a running gag (this is how the characters talk about God, using phrases that can be related to both her and the religious figure). During the plot, the protagonist falls in love with her and is therefore often nervous and stammering in her presence. God herself doesn't seem to have any special interest in him. As mentioned during the plot, God lives in a council flat and has a little son named Jesus with her boyfriend, who owns a mobile phone shop. Another running gag is God's frequent changes of profession, which all show precarious employment ("I collect shitty jobs like other people collect surprise egg figures!").

==== Herta ====
Herta is the owner of the narrator's local pub. She is apparently a former East Berlin native, as she e.g. disadvantages West Germans at her pub toilet; moreover, she speaks with a strong Berlin dialect. After she has to close her pub in the second book because a resident complains about the noise, she opens an illegal pub, mainly frequented by members of the Anti-Social Network and Spanish tourists. Herta is also part of the Anti-Social Network and has the nickname "Amazonenkönigin" (en: "Queen of the Amazons"). Her motto is: "Es jibt sone und solche, un' dann jibt's noch janz andre, aber det sind die Schlimmsten" (en: "There are such people and others, and then there are totally different ones, but those are the worst").

==== Sarah ====
Sarah is a young backpacker, who meets Marc-Uwe and the Kangaroo several times on their trip around the world. Sarah is an extremely hyperactive person, who talks quickly in streams of words. She likes to use English words like "amazing" and "awesome", as well as phrases such as "It's kind of like..." and "You know..." on a frequent basis. This phenomenon is said to occur due to the pills prescribed by her psychiatrist (this is a reference to a previously stated gag between the protagonist and his psychiatrist, who wants to prescribe Marc-Uwe mood lifters). During the plot, she develops a romantic interest in Marc-Uwe, which he does not return. Later in the story, it turns out that Sarah is actually from Germany, too, after which conversations between her and Marc-Uwe are held in German and not in English anymore.

=== Antagonists ===
==== The Penguin ====
At the End of Chronicles, the Penguin moves into the flat opposite of the one Marc-Uwe and the Kangaroo share. Shortly after that, the Penguin is proclaimed the "cosmic antagonist" by the Kangaroo. From Manifesto onwards, the Kangaroo and the Penguin aim to terrorise each other, amongst other things by loud noise. In Revelations, Marc-Uwe and the Kangaroo chase the Penguin around the world to prevent its "Kapitalistischen Weltverschlechterungsplan" (en: capitalist plan in order to screw up the world). As it turns out, there is not only one Penguin, but thousands. Their leader is a large emperor penguin.

==== Jörg and Jörn Dwigs ====
Jörn and Jörg Dwigs are twins. They first appear in Manifesto. Jörg is a judge for asylum law who became famous because of his 100% rejection quote. Jörn is a bank director and finances the populistic right-wing party Sicherheit und Verantwortung (SV) (meaning "security and responsibility"), which the two of them founded. He is the author of a book called "Ich bin ja kein Rassist, aber" ("Well, I´m not a racist, but"). Jörg Dwigs is an allusion to the Austrian right-wing populist Jörg Haider who was the chairman of the Austrian party FPÖ for many years.

==== Schmidtchen ====
Schmidtchen is a policeman who would like to arrest the Kangaroo, but his intellect is inferior to its rhetoric talent. He forgets his valid suspicions about the Kangaroo as soon as he enters the apartment and gets involved in a discussion with it, where it uses confusing arguments. He only appears in the Chronicles on two occasions.

=== Other characters and organizations ===
==== The Anti-Social Network ====
The Anti-Social Network is an "anti-terror-organization" that was founded by the Kangaroo. It works against the "terror of media, government and economy". The name was chosen because all systems that call themselves social are anti-social, according to the Kangaroo. Therefore, a truly social organization has to call itself anti-social. On the basis of the real structure of such organizations, every member and every gathering can give itself a senseless title, there are no hierarchies. The actions that the network carries out, the so-called anti-terror-attacks, can be named however the perpetrator wants to call them accordingly.

==== The psychiatrist ====
Since the very first volume, the narrator keeps appointments with his psychiatrist regularly and tells him about his adventures with the Kangaroo. The psychiatrist interprets the existence of the Kangaroo as a hallucination of the narrator until he brings the Kangaroo to an appointment. On the strength of that, the psychiatrist has a nervous breakdown, undergoes medical treatment himself, represses the existence of the Kangaroo and keeps trying to convince the I-narrator of its nonexistence. The fact that the psychiatrist rips diverse statements of the I-narrator out of its context and interprets them as romantic advances becomes another running gag. In doing so, his reaction is not averse, but he keeps affirming that his professional ethics prevent him from getting to know his patients privately.

== Genre ==
The works of the Kangaroo Chronicles are not actual chronicles but satiric and episodic novels. The books show a high degree of allusions, intertextuality, word play, punch lines and running gags. All four books reference popular culture and contain homages to movies (among them Star Wars, The Lord of the Rings, Fight Club) and literature. The allusions to the Viet Cong, the GDR, the history of communist ideology and its various movements, politics and contemporary history require a certain amount of historical and general knowledge. However, that never stopped the Chronicles from being widely read and listened to, by adults as well as children.

The individual texts display characteristics of short stories: a straight, episodic plot; a limited number of characters (with a tendency towards stereotypes); a determined beginning and a succinct end constructed as a punch line; stylistically concise and suggestive language and in regards to content a tendency towards the extraordinary. However, in contrast to a typical short story the two protagonists are both present in the stories most of the time, creating a two character perspective structure. Because of the jokes and its easiness to be read out aloud, the whole work shows similarities to a poetry slam. There are also parallels to a fable as there are animal protagonists with human attributes and a critical, educative tenor, all of which results in a satirical effect.

== Form and language ==
The Kangaroo Chronicles (the first volume of the series) relates the protagonists' adventures through a series of loosely connected short stories in chronological order. There are 81 in total, typically written in the present tense (except for Chapter 21, which is told metafictionally). Chapters are short (at most a dozen pages) and largely self-contained, but build on each other in the sense that prior events and punch lines previously set up are frequently referenced in later chapters, often as running gags. For instance, the narrator might obliquely mention pulling a book out of a fuzzy sock without comment, when previous chapters established that he keeps his books inside fuzzy socks to prevent them from sliding off his crooked shelf.

Some chapters of the first volume end in excerpts from "Opportunism and Repression", a fictional work of fundamental social science the Kangaroo is working on, but otherwise mainly consist of dialogue between the Kangaroo and the Narrator. Their discussions freely alternate between colloquial—even dialectual—, technical, and elevated registers, and frequently employ foreign and loan words and expressions to underscore the speakers' intellectualism. Kling also extensively toys with the form through metatextual features, such as having the characters use footnotes to comment on each other's dialogue lines, or even on other footnotes. Quotes occasionally feature at the beginning of a chapter—an intertextual custom of more traditional literature—but are rendered comical or absurd through misattribution. For example, Kling misattributes Kant's Categorical imperative thus:

Handle stets nur nach derjenigen Maxime, durch die du zugleich wollen kannst, dass sie ein allgemeines Gesetz werde.

— Silvio Berlusconi,

(en: Act only according to that maxim whereby you can, at the same time, will that it should become a universal law.) The author cites Monty Python and Calvin and Hobbes as his role models when it comes to humor.

Later volumes of the series retain a similar style, though the stories become progressively less self-contained in The Manifesto and The Revelations (particularly Part II), before The Apocrypha revert to independent stories which Kling arranges 'entertainingly', rather than chronologically.

== Reception ==
The Kangaroo Chronicles were received mostly positive by the cultural pages: The Süddeutsche Zeitung described the author as a "new high-flyer on the German cabaret scene", the Frankfurter Allgemeine Zeitung rated the columns as "eloquent, amusing and fast-paced", the radio station Deutschlandfunk Kultur praised: "Kling writes subtly exaggerated and radically direct." In the opinion of Elisabeth von Thadden in the weekly newspaper Die Zeit Kling offers "everything social philosophy has to offer in terms of social criticism: The kangaroo wants political participation (Jürgen Habermas), whines for recognition (Axel Honneth), needs love (Eva Illouz) and definitely resonance (Hartmut Rosa), seeks justice (John Rawls), wants to abolish the system (no one represents it any more), declares the biological gender difference irrelevant (Judith Butler). It wants to treat animals like humans (Martha Nussbaum) and suffocates in ambivalence (Zygmunt Bauman)". Sophie Weigand, in Literaturen (a German literature magazine), wrote "never has social criticism been so witty and so pointed at the same time, this book is not only alternative but also completely unrivalled. It is a satirical bible, precisely the Holy Scripture of the antisocial network." The satirical magazine Titanic, on the other hand, criticized that Kling "first of all wants to make one joke after another and not hurt anyone. Which is why the political aspects of his books seem just as harmless, unmotivated and largely senseless as the whole thing in the first place. One must have a childlike disposition to be inspired by such things (Original German quote: "zuvörderst einen Jux nach dem anderen machen und niemandem wehtun. Weshalb denn auch das Politische seiner Bücher genauso harmlos, unmotiviert und weitgehend sinnfrei daherkommt wie überhaupt das ganze Klingeling. Man muß schon über ein kindliches Gemüt verfügen, um sich von so etwas begeistern zu lassen.").

== Adaptations ==
=== Stage/theatre ===
A first theatre play of the Kangaroo Chronicles by Isabelle Chastenier and Benjamin Muth was staged at the Eduard-von-Winterstein-Theater in Annaberg-Buchholz in 2015. After that, guest performances in, inter alia, Berlin (Brotfabrik), Dresden (Johannstadthalle) and Freiburg (Wallgraben-Theater) followed. In 2016, Hans Schernthaner adapted the book for the stage. Under his direction, the Kangaroo Chronicles were staged at the Altonaer Theater. The cast consisted of Stephan Möller-Titel as Marc-Uwe and Robert Zimmermann as the kangaroo.

=== Movie ===
Filming of the movie The Kangaroo Chronicles (Die Känguru-Chroniken) began on September 26, 2018, in and around Berlin. The movie was produced by X-Film and the ZDF. It was directed by Dani Levy. Marc-Uwe Kling took responsibility for the script. The film is a combination of real film and computer animation. It was released in German cinemas on March 5, 2020, after being delayed by the COVID-19 pandemic.

Critical and public reception of the film was mixed.

A sequel, The Kangaroo Conspiracy (Die Känguru-Verschwörung) was released in cinemas on August 25th, 2022.

== English translations ==
- Kling, Marc-Uwe. The Kangaroo Chronicles. Translated by Sarah Cossaboon and Paul-Henri Campbell. Voland & Quist GmbH, 2016. Ebook.
- Kling, Marc-Uwe. The Kangaroo Chronicles – Best Of. Translated by Sarah Cossaboon and Paul-Henri Campbell. Performed by Marc-Uwe Kling. Voland & Quist GmbH, 2016. Audiobook.
