= The Kangaroo Chronicles (film) =

- Theatrical release poster
- Directed by: Dani Levy
- Written by: Marc-Uwe Kling
- Based on: The Kangaroo Chronicles by Marc-Uwe Kling
- Produced by: Stefan Arndt; Uwe Schott
- Starring: Marc-Uwe Kling; Dimitrij Schaad
- Cinematography: Filip Zumbrunn
- Edited by: Toni Froschhammer
- Music by: Niki Reiser
- Production companies: X Filme Creative Pool; ZDF; Trixter; Arri Media
- Distributed by: X Verleih AG (through Warner Bros.)
- Release date: 5 March 2020
- Running time: 92 minutes
- Country: Germany
- Language: German
- Box office: $5 million

The Kangaroo Chronicles (German: Die Känguru-Chroniken) is a 2020 German comedy film directed by Dani Levy and written by Marc-Uwe Kling, based on his book series The Kangaroo Chronicles.

The film was released in Germany on 5 March 2020 by X Verleih AG though Warner Bros. A sequel, The Kangaroo Conspiracy was released in 2022.

== Plot ==
One day, at the door of Marc-Uwe Kling-a small-time artist living in Berlin-Kreuzberg-rings an unexpected guest: a communist kangaroo that has squatted the apartment across the hall. Since the police are searching for the marsupial, anarchist Marc-Uwe unwillingly ends up in a shared flat with the animal.

A year later, the duo discovers that Jörg Dwigs, a right-wing populist politician from the “Alternative to Democracy” party (AzD) and CEO of the “Our Homeland Inc.”, has purchased the land adjacent to Görlitzer Park. He plans to build the “Europa Tower,” a monument to patriotism. Soon, Marc-Uwe and the kangaroo attract the wrath of a group of neo-Nazis who chase them all the way to their home. During the escape, the kangaroo knocks Dwigs over and steals his car keys. Mistaking Dwigs’ car for Marc-Uwe's, the neo-Nazis smash it to pieces-putting themselves in debt to the politician. Meanwhile, the kangaroo removes a rabbit's foot from the keychain, a deeply sentimental item for Dwigs as it's the last memento of his late father.

Marc-Uwe and the kangaroo, along with their neighbors, form the “Anti-Social Network” to fight for the preservation of the park. Dwigs soon realizes the kangaroo has his rabbit's foot and hires the neo-Nazis to beat up Marc-Uwe and the kangaroo until they return it. When the duo confronts Dwigs, he reveals he also plans to demolish their building.

Through his psychotherapist—who also happens to be Dwigs’ therapist-Marc-Uwe uncovers the politician's weak spot: Dwigs has forged several reports to hide the true, exorbitant costs of the Europa Tower. Marc-Uwe, his neighbor Maria (for whom he has romantic feelings), and the kangaroo sneak into a party hosted by Dwigs to obtain evidence of the fraud. Using stolen invitations, they gain entry. While Marc-Uwe distracts the guests with a self-written song, Maria and the kangaroo search Dwigs’ office and download files from his computer. Unfortunately, the files turn out to be worthless. The kangaroo, however, can't resist stealing the rabbit's foot again.

During their escape, the kangaroo crashes Dwigs’ car into his pool, leading to Marc-Uwe's arrest and temporary detention. After his bail is paid via crowdfunding, the Anti-Social Network sabotages the groundbreaking ceremony of the Europa Tower. In retaliation, Dwigs sends the neo-Nazis back to the apartment building. As the residents barricade themselves inside, Marc-Uwe discovers a USB stick hidden inside the rabbit's foot-containing incriminating evidence against Dwigs. Maria uploads the files online, leading to the arrest of Dwigs, his henchmen, and the neo-Nazis.

In one of three post-credit scenes, it's revealed that “Our Homeland Inc.” has been bought by the Penguin.

== Cast ==
- Marc-Uwe Kling as The Kangaroo
  - Volker Zack provides motion capture for the character.
- Dimitrij Schaad as Marc-Uwe
- Rosalie Thomass as Maria
- Adnan Maral as Friedrich-Wilhelm
- Tim Seyfi as Otto
- Carmen-Maja Antoni as Herta
- Bettina Lamprecht as Jeanette
- Oskar Strohecker as Jesus
