= Niki Reiser =

Swiss film score composer and flautist

- Born: 12 May 1958 (age 68); Reinach, Aargau, Switzerland
- Education: Berklee College of Music
- Occupations: Film score composer; flautist
- Website: nikireiser.de

Niki Reiser (born 12 May 1958) is a Swiss film score composer and flautist. He is considered one of the most outstanding film composers of the German-speaking countries, winning the German Film Award five times. His debut was in 1986 the score for the film Du mich auch, directed by Dani Levy, for whom he has composed all further scores. He had his breakthrough with the music for the film Beyond Silence, directed by Caroline Link in 1996.

== Biography ==
Niki Reiser was born in 1958 in Reinach, Aargau in Switzerland, the son of a pastor and a nurse. Before he came to Basel age twelve, where he has lived since, he spent four years in Schaffhausen. In addition to classical flute lessons a child, he invented his own melodies on the piano. In his youth he played in several bands, composed pieces for them and for theater performances at school.

In the 1970s, Reiser studied classical music with an emphasis on flute in Basel. From 1980 to 1984 he studied in Boston at the Berklee College of Music jazz and classical music with a focus on film music. From 1984 to 1986, Reiser lived partly in Europe, mostly in Switzerland, where he continued his studies in composition in Basel. In workshops in the U.S., he met Ennio Morricone and Jerry Goldsmith who influenced his music. During this time he composed his first pieces for movies. During this period he also toured as a jazz flutist with the ensemble People, which he had co-founded.

In 1986, Reiser moved back to Europe where he met the film director Dani Levy. He composed the music for his first film Du mich auch. The film was a surprising success throughout Europe and was nominated for the Golden Camera at the Cannes International Film Festival in 1987. This encounter started a lasting friendship, resulting in Reiser composing the music for all of Levy's films.

At that time Reiser joined the klezmer band Kolsimcha as a flutist, and composed several pieces for the group. On two world tours he played with the band in Carnegie Hall and at the Montreux Jazz Festival, among others.

When Reiser realised that it was impossible to be a flutist and a composer at the same time, he concentrated on composition. In addition to working with Levy, he also composed for Caroline Link, whom he met in 1996. His breakthrough came with the music for her movie Beyond Silence. For her film Nowhere in Africa, Reiser studied African music in Nairobi. The influences of indigenous Kenyan music can be seen in the score he composed for the film. In addition to cinema and TV films, he also wrote music for the theater. In 2008 he worked again for Link for A Year Ago in Winter. The score won both the Preis der deutschen Filmkritik and the Deutscher Filmpreis of 2009.

Reiser has his studio in Basel's Gundeldingerfeld. He is on the board of the Deutsche Filmakademie since its inception in 2003.

== Awards ==
As of 2012, Reiser was awarded the German film prize Deutscher Filmpreis five times. In 2005, he was the 12th recipient of the Rheingau Musik Preis, as "a composer who repeatedly and majestically succeeds in meeting the particular dramaturgical needs entailed by film scores, and thus suffusing each individual work with its own unique sound".

- 1997 Bayerischer Filmpreis for Beyond Silence
- 1997 Deutscher Filmpreis for Beyond Silence
- 1999 Deutscher Filmpreis for Meschugge and Annaluise & Anton
- 2001 Film music prize of the SUISA foundation for Cold Is the Evening Breeze
- 2002 Deutscher Filmpreis for Nowhere in Africa
- 2004 Preis der deutschen Filmkritik for The Flying Classroom
- 2005 Deutscher Filmpreis for Alles auf Zucker!
- 2005 Rheingau Music Prize
- 2008 Bayerischer Filmpreis for Liebesleben
- 2009 Preis der deutschen Filmkritik for A Year Ago in Winter
- 2009 Deutscher Filmpreis for A Year Ago in Winter
- 2011 Film music prize of the SUISA foundation Promising the Moon

== Filmography ==
- 1986: Du mich auch – directed by Anja Franke, Dani Levy
- 1986: Die Nacht der lebenden Schäffchen (short film) – directed by Walder, Zago
- 1989: RobbyKallePaul – directed by Dani Levy
- 1989: Abgeschleppt – directed by Dani Levy
- 1992: I Was on Mars – directed by Dani Levy
- 1993: Anna annA – directed by Jürgen Brauer, Greti Kläy
- 1994: Nobody Loves Me – directed by Doris Dörrie
- 1994: Wilder Hunger (short film) – directed by Hercli Bundi
- 1995: Surprise! (short film) – directed by Veit Helmer
- 1995: Silent Night – directed by Dani Levy
- 1996: Beyond Silence – directed by Caroline Link
- 1996: Liebling vergiß die Socken nicht – directed by Tobias Meinecke
- 1996: Halbe Herzen (short film) – directed by László I. Kish
- 1997: In the Name of Innocence – directed by Andreas Kleinert
- 1998: Meschugge – directed by Dani Levy
- 1998: The Trio – directed by Hermine Huntgeburth
- 1999: Das Geheimnis der Sicherheit – directed by Dani Levy
- 1999: Annaluise & Anton – directed by Caroline Link
- 2000: Cold Is the Evening Breeze – directed by Rainer Kaufmann
- 2000: Ein todsicheres Geschäft – directed by Matthias X. Oberg
- 2001: Heaven (partly) – directed by Tom Tykwer
- 2001: Nowhere in Africa – directed by Caroline Link
- 2001: Heidi – directed by Markus Imboden
- 2002: The Flying Classroom – directed by Tomy Wigand
- 2002: I'm the Father – directed by Dani Levy
- 2003: Bouillabaisse – directed by Frank Papenbroock
- 2004: Alles auf Zucker! – directed by Dani Levy
- 2004: Summer Storm – directed by Marco Kreuzpaintner
- 2005: The White Masai – directed by Hermine Huntgeburth
- 2007: Love Life – directed by Maria Schrader
- 2007: My Führer – The Really Truest Truth about Adolf Hitler – directed by Dani Levy
- 2008: A Year Ago in Winter – directed by Caroline Link
- 2009: Wedding Fever in Campobello – directed by Neele Vollmar
- 2009: The Wild Chicks and Life – directed by Vivian Naefe
- 2010: Life Is Too Long – directed by Dani Levy
- 2011: Promising the Moon – directed by Hans Steinbichler
