= X Filme Creative Pool =

German television and film production company

- Type: Subsidiary
- Industry: Feature films
- Founded: 1994
- Founders: Tom Tykwer; Dani Levy; Wolfgang Becker; Stefan Arndt
- Headquarters: Berlin, Germany
- Key people: Tom Tykwer (head director of production)
- Parent: X Filme
- Website: x-filme.de/en/

X Filme Creative Pool is a German television and film production company based in Berlin.

== History ==
X Filme was founded in 1994 in Berlin by the directors Tom Tykwer, Dani Levy and Wolfgang Becker and the producer Stefan Arndt. The inspiration for X Filme Creative Pool were the founders of United Artists, with the idea that artistic and, above all, economic independence should enable more creative work. The first film that X Filme produced was Dani Levy's Silent Night in 1995. In 1998, the company became synonymous with a new, young German cinema thanks to the international success of Tom Tykwer's Run Lola Run. This was followed by other films that were successful at the box office and in some cases also with film critics, such as Tykwer's Heaven, Becker's Good Bye, Lenin! and Levy's Alles auf Zucker!. In 2000, however, 50.1% of the shares were sold to Berlin-based Senator Film.

In 2000, the company founded its own film distribution company X Verleih, which works closely with the German branch of Warner Bros. using its distribution structure. X Filme has also been working with Warner Home Video in the home entertainment sector since the end of 2001, supplying content that WHV Germany and WHV Switzerland distribute through their traditional channels.

After Senator Film went broke in 2004, the partners tried to buy the company back from the bankruptcy estate. However, this was unsuccessful, so Becker, Tykwer and Levy founded Y Filme in February 2006. In February 2008, Senator Film announced its separation from X Filme while maintaining distribution arrangements. Stefan Arndt, Dani Levy and Tom Tykwer continued to manage the company. In May 2024, Tykwer took over the managing director position from Arndt, with Uwe Schott, a producer who had joined X Filme in 2009, joining Tykwer to head the company.

== Filmography ==
Feature films, television films and short films produced by X Filme, including co-productions and films distributed through its distribution arm X Verleih:

=== Film ===
Year	German or Original Title	English Language Distribution Title	Director	Type
1995	Stille Nacht	Silent Night	Dani Levy	Feature
1997	Das Leben ist eine Baustelle	Life Is All You Get	Wolfgang Becker	Feature
1997	Winterschläfer	Winter Sleepers	Tom Tykwer	Feature
1998	Lola rennt	Run Lola Run	Tom Tykwer	Feature
1998	Meschugge	The Giraffe	Dani Levy	Feature
1999	Absolute Giganten	-	Sebastian Schipper	Feature
2000	Paul Is Dead	-	Henk Handloegten	Feature
2000	Der Krieger und die Kaiserin	The Princess and the Warrior	Tom Tykwer	Feature
2001	Heidi M.	-	Michael Klier	Feature
2001	Wie Feuer und Flamme	-	Connie Walther	Feature
2001	Herz	Heart	Horst Johann Sczerba	Feature
2002	Heaven	-	Tom Tykwer	Feature
2002	Väter	I'm the Father	Dani Levy	Feature
2003	Good Bye, Lenin!	-	Wolfgang Becker	Feature
2003	Der alte Affe Angst	Angst	Oskar Roehler	Feature
2003	liegen lernen	Learning to Lie	Henk Handloegten	Feature
2003	4 Freunde und 4 Pfoten	-	Gabriele Heberling	Feature
2004	Was nützt die Liebe in Gedanken	Love in Thoughts	Achim von Borries	Feature
2004	True	-	Tom Tykwer	Short
2004	Jargo	-	María Solrun	Feature
2004	Lautlos	Soundless	Mennan Yapo	Feature
2004	Edelweißpiraten	Edelweiss Pirates	Niko von Glasow	Feature
2004	En Garde	-	Ayse Polat	Feature
2004	Agnes und seine Brüder	Agnes and His Brothers	Oskar Roehler	Feature
2004	Alles auf Zucker!	Go for Zucker	Dani Levy	Feature
2004	Der Rote Kakadu	The Red Cockatoo	Dominick Graf	Feature
2005	Underexposure	-	Oday Rasheed	Feature
2005	Ich Dich auch	Love Me Do	Christiane Voss	Documentary
2006	Der die Tollkirsche ausgräbt	-	Franka Potente	Short
2006	Ein Freund von mir	A Friend of Mine	Sebastian Schipper	Feature
2007	Mein Führer – Die wirklich wahrste Wahrheit über Adolf Hitler	My Führer – The Really Truest Truth about Adolf Hitler	Dani Levy	Feature
2007	Goodbye Bafana	Goodbye Bafana/The Color of Freedom (US)	Bille August	Feature
2007	Max Minsky und ich	Max Minsky and Me	Anna Justice	Feature
2007	Die drei Räuber	The Three Robbers	Hayo Freitag	Feature
2007	Liebesleben	Love Life	Maria Schrader	Feature
2007	Meine schöne Bescherung	Messy Christmas	Vanessa Jopp	Feature
2008	Märzmelodie	Melodies of Spring	Martin Walz	Feature
2008	Funny Games U.S.	Funny Games	Michael Haneke	Feature
2008	Der Mongole	Mongol	Sergei Bodrov	Feature
2008	Alter und Schönheit	-	Michael Klier	Feature
2009	Lulu & Jimi	Lulu and Jimi	Oscar Roehler	Feature
2009	Die Gräfin	The Countess	Julie Delpy	Feature
2009	Das weiße Band – Eine deutsche Kindergeschichte	The White Ribbon	Michael Haneke	Feature
2010	Das Leben ist zu lang	Life Is Too Long	Dani Levy	Feature
2010	Drei	Three	Tom Tykwer	Feature
2012	Little Thirteen	-	Christian Klandt	Feature
2012	Liebe	Amour	Michael Haneke	Feature
2012	Nachtlärm	Lullaby Ride	Christoph Schaub	Feature
2012	Cloud Atlas	-	Lana and Lilly Wachowski, Tom Tykwer	Feature
2014	Das finstere Tal	The Dark Valley	Andreas Prochaska	Feature
2016	Uns geht es gut	-	Henri Steinmetz	Feature
2016	Vor der Morgenröte	Stefan Zweig: Farewell to Europe	Maria Schrader	Feature
2017	Happy End	-	Michael Haneke	Feature
2019	Alfons Zitterbacke – Das Chaos ist zurück	-	Mark Schlichter	Feature
2020	Die Känguru-Chroniken	The Kangaroo Chronicles	Dani Levy	Feature
2022	Die Känguru-Verschwörung	The Kangaroo Conspiracy	Mark-Uwe Kling, de:Alexander Berner	Feature
2023	Die Unschärferelation der Liebe	-	Lars Kraume	Feature
2025	Das Licht	The Light	Tom Tykwer	Feature
2026	Selten wache ich träumend auf	I Rarely Wake Up Dreaming	Isabelle Stever	Feature

=== Television ===
Year	German or Original Title	English Language Distribution Title	Director	Type
2015	Unter Gaunern	-	Sophie Allet-Coche, Andreas Menck	TV series
2016	Tatort: Die Wahrheit	-	Sebastian Marka	TV episode
2017	Wunschkinder	-	Emily Atef	TV series
2017	Tatort: Der Tod ist unser ganzes Leben	-	de:Philip Koch	TV series episode
2017	Babylon Berlin	-	Henk Handloegten, Achim von Borries, Tom Tykwer	TV series
2018	Tatort: Im toten Winkel	-	Philip Koch	TV series episode
2018	Tatort: Blut	-	Philip Koch	TV series episode
2019	Tatort: Unklare Lage	-	Pia Strietmann	TV series episode
2020	Tatort: In der Familie	-	Diminick Graf, Pia Strietmann	TV series episode
2021	Wild Republic	-	Markus Goller, Lennart Ruff	TV series
2021	Doktor Ballouz	-	several	TV series
2021	Tina mobil	-	Richard Huber	TV series
2021	Furia	-	Magnus Martens, Lars Kraume	TV series

== See also ==
- Media in Berlin
