= 00 Schneider – Jagd auf Nihil Baxter =

1994 film by Helge Schneider

- Directed by: Helge Schneider
- Written by: Helge Schneider, Brötchen
- Produced by: Hanno Huth
- Starring: Helge Schneider, Helmut Körschgen, Andreas Kunze
- Cinematography: Christoph Schlingensief
- Edited by: Andrea Schumacher
- Music by: Helge Schneider
- Release date: 22 December 1994
- Running time: 90 minutes
- Country: Germany
- Language: German

00 Schneider – Jagd auf Nihil Baxter (Hunt for Nihil Baxter) is a German comedy-film directed by Helge Schneider. It was released on 22 December 1994.

He wrote the script as well as the music, did film direction, and played the main character and several additional roles.

== Plot ==
The funny clown Bratislav Metulskie is found dead in the "Apollo" circus. Retired inspector 00 Schneider is asked to take over the case. Schneider and his aged sidekick Körschgen investigate the murder and soon identify a suspect by the name of Nihil Baxter. The passionate art collector is a little nuts and does not cultivate social contacts at all. Inspector Schneider investigates at the circus and pays Baxter a visit. Baxter makes up an alibi and claims that he was working on a painting when the murder took place. Körschgen finds out that the picture is an imitation. When Baxter tries to escape to Rio by plane after he stole a sculpture from the practice of Dr. Hasenbein, 00 Schneider and his sidekick are also on board. As they are incognito, they are able to arrest the criminal with the help of the world-famous "sniffer dog nose" pilot.

== Creation ==
Helge Schneider has described his second film as his best. The film is a colorful kaleidoscope of characters, scenes and locations. Even more than the other Schneider films, this one is characterized by a loose, often almost superfluous basic plot, which Schneider repeatedly tilts, twists or even abandons with great pleasure. An avant-garde sequence in the Neandertal Museum in Mettmann, for example, which is accompanied by an opera parody sung by Schneider himself (Schneider sings the operating instructions for a Uher tape recorder backwards), turns out to be the detective's dream. What was most important to Schneider was the portrayal of the characters' lives and everyday lives. Added to this was his special way of filming: basically without a script.

Filming took place in Schneider's hometown of Mülheim an der Ruhr and in the rest of the Ruhr area, such as in Gelsenkirchen, where the Circus Apollo performed in the so-called Kesselpark .

With the inspector, Schneider brings a character to the screen that he developed in his crime novels and had already introduced in Texas: Doc Snyder Holds the World in Suspense. An important stylistic feature of the novels is the exaggerated depiction of violence that is absurd, which was not implemented in the film in this form. But even this 00 Schneider has a latent arbitrariness and brutality, for example when he destroys a little boy's scooter. A scene in which he fights with Nihil Baxter did not make it into the final version of the film.

Schneider can be seen in four roles in the film: as Inspector 00 Schneider, as criminal Nihil Baxter, as amateur surgeon Dr. Hasenbein and as pop star Johnny Flash, which required the sometimes complicated use of doubles. Schneider deliberately chose a double who did not look like him. A scene with the inspector, Körschgen and Nihil Baxter in the same room became a technical challenge when Körschgen was also unable to take part due to illness.

Other double roles are played by Andreas Kunze (as Mrs. Inspector 00 Schneider and as a tiger in the circus) and Thomas Busch (as secretary and double of Helge Schneider).

The cars used in the film are a Jaguar E-Type, a Peugeot 404 and a Triumph TR3.

== Main cast ==
- Helge Schneider - 00 Schneider/Nihil Baxter/Professor Hasenbein/Johnny Flash
- Helmut Körschgen - Körschgen
- Andreas Kunze - Friend of 00 Schneider
- Werner Abrolat - Chief of Police
- Bratislav Metulskie - Metulskie
- Guenther Kordas - Ringmaster
