= A Year Ago in Winter =

- Theatrical release poster
- Directed by: Caroline Link
- Written by: Caroline Link
- Based on: Aftermath by Scott Campbell
- Produced by: Robert W. Cort; Scarlett Lacey; Martin Moszkowicz; Oliver Nommsen; Uschi Reich
- Cinematography: Bella Halben
- Edited by: Patricia Rommel
- Music by: Martin Stock, Niki Reiser
- Production company: Bavaria Film
- Distributed by: Constantin Film
- Release date: 9 September 2008 (Toronto International Film Festival)
- Running time: 152 minutes
- Country: Germany
- Language: German

A Year Ago in Winter (German: Im Winter ein Jahr) is a 2008 German drama film directed by Caroline Link. It is based on the novel Aftermath by American author Scott Campbell, telling the story of a "complicated family situation" after the unexpected and unexplained suicide of a young man. It deals with the consequences of overly long suppressed mourning. The film score was composed by Niki Reiser, arranged, directed and produced by Martin Stock.

The film was premiered at the 2008 Toronto International Film Festival, and its theatrical release was on 13 November 2008. The fotorealistic painting featured in the film was made by the Munich artist Florian Sussmayr.

== Cast ==
- Karoline Herfurth as Lilli Richter
- Josef Bierbichler as Max Hollander, painter
- Corinna Harfouch as Eliane Richter
- Hanns Zischler as Dr. Thomas Richter
- Mišel Matičević as Aldo
- Cyril Sjöström as Alexander Richter
- Daniel Berini as Tom
- Franz Dinda as Johannes
- Karin Boyd as Renee Walters
- Jacob Matschenz as Tobias Hollander
- Inka Friedrich as Andrea
- Hansa Czypionka as Stephan
- Paula Kalenberg as Stella

== Plot ==
The Munich-based interior designer, Eliane Richter, shown "in the constant stress of the annoyed career woman", commissions the painter, Max Hollander, to draw a portrait of her children, Alexander and Lilly. Eliane's husband depicted "in the hard shell of a cultivated power man", goes along with her wish. Eliane wants the portrait in memoriam of Alexander, who took his life about a year before. She provides pictures and videos of him for the painter. She wants Lilli to sit for a double portrait, but Lilli is disgusted by the idea to have her dead brother on the wall "for decoration". Lilli is an emotionally troubled ballet student, unsettled by career and commitment pressure. Unlike her mother, she is not disciplined and loses her leading role at the Theatre Academy because of disputes with her teacher. She tries unsuccessfully to find closeness and intimacy in her relationship with the artist Aldo.

At the sessions with Max, Lilli is reserved at first whereas he seeks to look behind her facade and capture her character in the painting. He recognizes the profound relationship between the siblings and understands Lilli's realm of feelings better and better. Thereby he also is able to connect to the personal losses in his own history. The relationship between painter and model deepens, and they trust each other more and more.

The resulting portrait does not meet Eliane's expectations, but breaks her reservations regarding Lilly. She is able to begin to cope with the death of her son. Lilly accepts that she will not figure out the reason of her brother's suicide, and is then able to forgive him.

== Reception ==
The film received more positive than negative reviews in Germany:

Der Spiegel gave it a mixed review, commending Caroline Link for taking on a risky project because of its "aloof substance". Urs Jenny criticized that the film did not show and tell the world of Lilli´s parents and wonders why it took the producer years to complete the film from its beginnings in the US to its completion in Bavaria.

Writing for Focus, Harald Pauli attempted to answer this question quoting Caroline Link saying, that the death of her father, a friend and her daughter’s severe illness cast a shadow on her life. He reviewed the film favourably, calling A Year Ago in Winter "a serious, very adult movie". He pointed out that the film again contains Link´s favorite motif of snow again as in her prior film Jenseits der Stille: " A Year Ago in Winter has the texture of snow: the flakes fall lightly and poetically, but they can also condense into a blanket that weighs heavily and dangerously on the world."

Sueddeutsche Zeitung raved about the filming locations and a reference to the 1991 movie La Belle Noiseuse by Jacques Rivette. Likewise, film-dienst praised its "many pictorial compositional and representational finesses" without which "one would probably have to critically name the trivial pitfalls of the plot, which often touch the melodramatic, even kitschy".

The reviewer for Frankfurter Allgemeine Zeitung felt that the film was "about the biggest, most serious feelings. But the director doesn’t force them on the viewer. Instead of something pompous, whiny, pathological or sticky" one sees "what used to be called "Trauerarbeit", the work of mourning".

Frankfurter Rundschau stood out in harshly criticizing the "long-awaited film" after a seven year hiatus as being "unfortunately long and predictable... with an irrepressible love for the surfaces of bourgeois life". It made short shrift of the musical score and the camera: "Niki Reiser’s omnipresent film music and Bella Halben’s camera only double the solidity of the bourgeois milieu, instead of breaking it up and emotionalizing it properly". It finds fault with Scott Campbell's score fitting too neatly into the conventions of bourgeois psychodramas, as they have been innumerably varied in the cinema since Robert Redford’s classic "A Normal Family".

== Awards ==
Caroline Herfurth received the Bavarian Film Award for "Beste Nachwuchsschauspielerin" (best upcoming actress), and the Preis der deutschen Filmkritik. The film was nominated for the Deutscher Filmpreis in the categories Bester Spielfilm (best feature), Bester Hauptdarsteller (best main actor) and Bester Schnitt (best editing). Film composer Niki Reiser was awarded the prize.
