= Du mich auch =

1986 film

Du mich auch (English title: You Love Me Too) is a 1986 West German film directed by Anja Franke, Helmut Berger and Dani Levy. The film score was composed by Niki Reiser on his debut.
