= Marc-Uwe Kling =

German entertainer (born 1982)

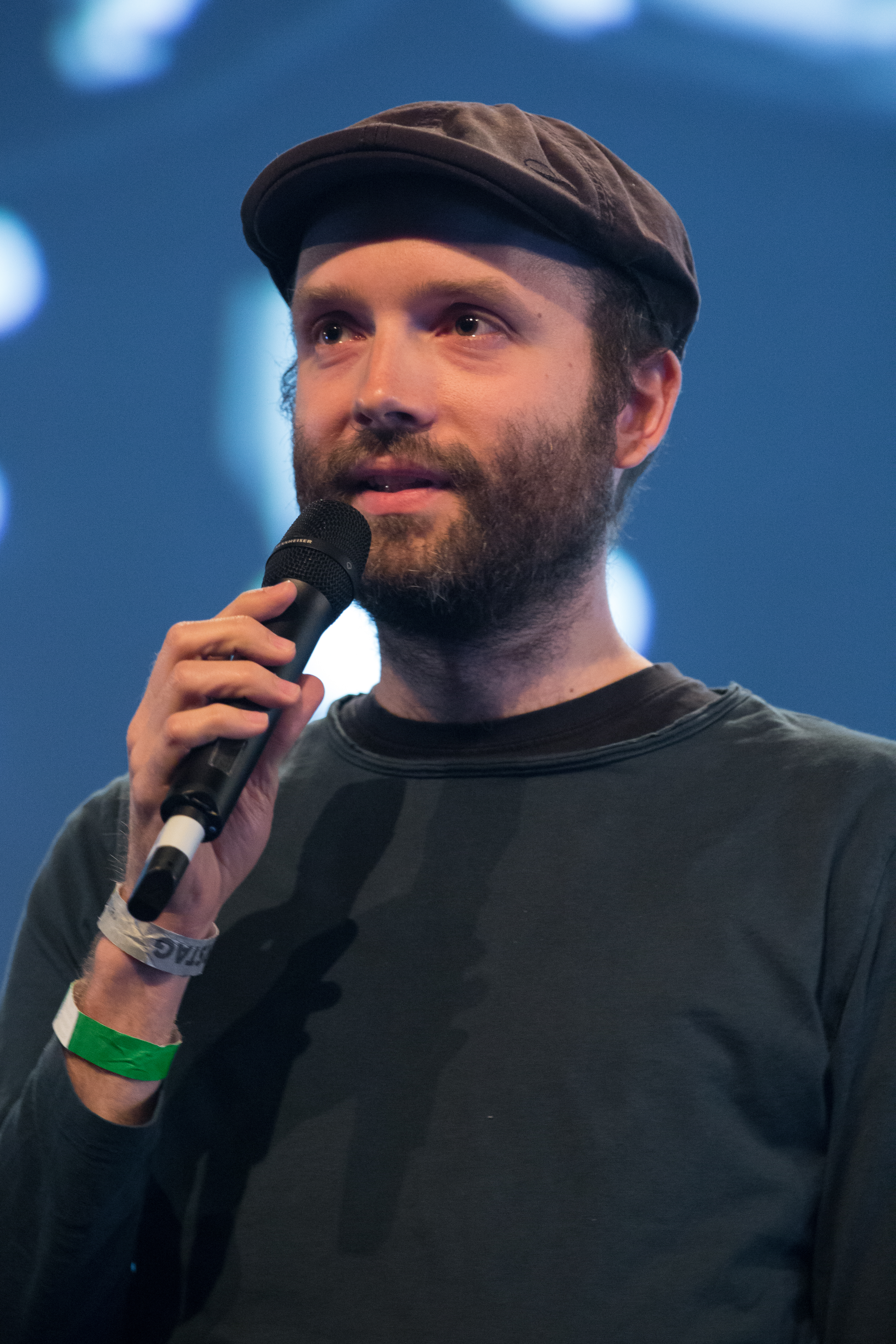
- Kling in 2018
- Born: 1982 (age 43–44); Stuttgart, Germany
- Occupations: Songwriter; author; entertainer
- Known for: QualityLand
- Website: marcuwekling.de/en

Marc-Uwe Kling (German pronunciation: [ˌmaʁkʔuːvə ˈklɪŋ]; born 1982) is a German songwriter, author, and Kabarett (political stand-up comedy) artist. He studied philosophy and drama at Freie Universität Berlin.

Since 2003, Kling regularly performs on various stages in Berlin. Frequently, he performs at literary and Kabarett events as well as poetry slams. In 2004, he founded a serial public literary event called Lesedüne (a pun made of the German words Lesebühne, "lecture stage", and Düne, "dune"). Since 2005, Kling tours with his program Wenn alle Stricke reißen, kann man sich nicht mal mehr aufhängen (If all ropes snap, you can't even hang yourself anymore), which is also the title of his first album. Every first Tuesday of the month, he organizes and hosts the Kreuzberg Slam in the Lido (formerly Kato) location, and every first Wednesday the Poetry Slam of Studentisches Kulturzentrum in Potsdam.

Kling hosts the weekly podcast Neues vom Känguru ("News from the Kangaroo") for Fritz, a Potsdam-based radio station, which deals with the same theme as his book Die Känguru-Chroniken (The Kangaroo Chronicles): A "phlegmatic anarchist" who lives with a talking, "pragmatically communist" kangaroo as his roommate.

In 2017, Kling published a comedic dystopian novel titled QualityLand. In March 2019, HBO announced that they would create a series based on the book, directed by Mike Judge.

== Publications ==
=== Books ===
==== The Kangaroo Chronicles (German: Die Känguru-Chroniken) ====
- The Kangaroo Manifesto, German: Die Känguru-Chroniken. Ansichten eines vorlauten Beuteltieres, Ullstein, 2009, ISBN 978-3-548-37257-0, 272 pp
- Kling, Marc-Uwe (2020). Die Känguru-Chroniken Ansichten eines vorlauten Beuteltieres (in German). Berlin: Ullstein-Taschenbuchverlag. ISBN 978-3-548-06373-7. OCLC 1135363453.
- The Kangaroo Manifesto; German: Das Känguru-Manifest, Ullstein, 2011, ISBN 978-3-548-37383-6, 304 pp
- The Kangaroo Revelations, German: Die Känguru-Offenbarung, Ullstein, 2014, ISBN 978-3-548-37513-7, 400 pp
- The Kangaroo Apocrypha; German: Die Känguru-Apokryphen, Ullstein, 2018, ISBN 978-3-548-29195-6, 208 pp
- Die Känguru-Trilogie (Band 1–3), Ullstein, 2015, ISBN 978-3-548-37623-3, 976 pp
- Die Känguru-Tetralogie (Band 1–4), Berlin: Ullstein, 2020, ISBN 978-3-548-06161-0, 1184 pp

===== Die Känguru-Comics =====
- Kling, Marc-Uwe; Kissel, Bernd (2022). Die Känguru-Comics also ICH könnte das besser (in German). Hamburg. ISBN 978-3-551-72828-9. OCLC 1309300300.
- Kling, Marc-Uwe; Cronauer, Jan; Eichhorst, Axel (2022). Die Känguru-Verschwörung der Storyboard-Comic zum Film (in German). Berlin. ISBN 978-3-550-20224-7. OCLC 1342147479.

==== QualityLand ====
- QualityLand (dunkle Ausgabe), Ullstein, 2017, ISBN 978-3-550-05015-2
- QualityLand (helle Ausgabe), Ullstein, 2017, ISBN 978-3-550-05023-7
- QualityLand 2.0: Kikis Geheimnis, Ullstein, 2020, ISBN 978-3550201028

===== QualityLand Comics =====
- QualityLand: Band 1.1, Voland & Quist, 2020, ISBN 978-3863912239, with Zachary Tallent
- QualityLand: Band 1.2, Leipzig/Berlin: Voland & Quist, 2023, ISBN 978-3863913052, 176 pp, with Zachary Tallen

==== Children's books ====
- Prinzessin Popelkopf, Voland & Quist, 2015, ISBN 978-3-86391-116-4 illustrations by Astrid Henn, 36 pp
- Der Ostermann, Carlsen, 2017, ISBN 978-3-551-51935-1
- Das NEINhorn, Carlsen, 2019, ISBN 978-3551518415 illustrations by Astrid Henn, 48 pp
- Das NEINhorn und die SchLANGEWEILE, Carlsen, 2021, ISBN 978-3-551-52128-6 illustrations by Astrid Henn, 54 pp

===== Der Tag, an dem... series =====
- Der Tag, an dem die Oma das Internet kaputt gemacht hat, Carlsen, 2018, ISBN 978-3-551-51679-4 illustrations by Astrid Henn.
- Der Tag, an dem der Opa den Wasserkocher auf den Herd gestellt hat, Carlsen, 2020, ISBN 978-3-551-51930-6illustrations by Astrid Henn.
- Der Tag, an dem Papa ein heikles Gespräch führen wollte, Carlsen, 2021, ISBN 978-3-551-51997-9 illustrations by Astrid Henn.
- Der Tag, an dem Tiffany das Wasser aus der Wanne geschaukelt hat, Carlsen, 2022, ISBN 978-3551521682 illustrations by Astrid Henn.

==== Calendars ====
- Der falsche Kalender, Voland & Quist, 2012, ISBN 978-3-86391-018-1
- Der furchtbare Kalender, Voland & Quist, 2016, ISBN 978-3-86391-168-3
- Der falsche Kalender 2, Voland & Quist, 2018, ISBN 978-3-86391-219-2

==== Anthologies (selection) ====
- With Julius Fischer, Sebastian Lehmann, Maik Martschinkowsky and Kolja Reichert (2012), Über Wachen und Schlafen: Systemrelevanter Humor., Leipzig/Berlin: Voland & Quist, ISBN 978-3-86391-013-6
- With Julius Fischer, Sebastian Lehmann and Maik Martschinkowsky (2015), Über Arbeiten und Fertigsein. Real existierender Humor, Leipzig/Berlin: Voland & Quist, ISBN 978-3-86391-113-3

=== Audio (selection) ===
==== Die Känguru-Chroniken ====
- Die Känguru-Chroniken, Hörbuch-Verlag, 2009, ISBN 978-3-86909-017-7
- Das Känguru-Manifest, Hörbuch-Verlag, 2011, ISBN 978-3-86909-075-7
- Die Känguru-Offenbarung. Live und ungekürzt., Hörbuch-Verlag, 2014, ISBN 978-3-86909-135-8
- Die Känguru-Apokryphen, Hörbuch-Verlag, 2018, ISBN 978-3957131492
- Kling, Marc-Uwe (2020), Das Känguru-Sammelsurium (in German), Hamburg, ISBN 978-3-8449-2470-1, OCLC 1155527693

==== QualityLand ====
- QualityLand (Helle Edition); Live-Mitschnitt, Hörbuch-Verlag, 2017, ISBN 978-3-95713-101-0
- QualityLand (Dunkle Edition); Live-Mitschnitt, Hörbuch-Verlag, 2017, ISBN 978-3-95713-094-5
- QualityLand 2.0, Hörbuch-Verlag, 2020, ISBN 978-3957132154

==== Children's books ====
- Kling, Marc-Uwe; Löbsack, Boris (2018). Der Tag, an dem die Oma das Internet kaputt gemacht hat, Der Ostermann, Prinzessin Popelkopf 1 CD (in German). Hamburg. ISBN 978-3-7456-0013-1. OCLC 1032358117.
- Löbsack, Boris (2020), Das Neinhorn. (in German), Hamburg: Silberfisch, ISBN 978-3-7456-0141-1, OCLC 1195490880
- Kling, Marc-Uwe; Henn, Astrid ca. Jh (2021). Das NEINhorn und die SchLANGEWEILE (in German). Hamburg: Carlsen Verlag. ISBN 978-3-551-52128-6. OCLC 1248721422.

==== Others ====
- Wenn alle Stricke reißen, kann man sich nicht mal mehr aufhängen., WortArt, 2008, ISBN 978-3-931780-93-7
- Marc-Uwe Kling und die Gesellschaft, WortArt, 2011, ISBN 978-3-941082-39-7
- Viel Schönes Dabei, Voland & Quist, 2016, ISBN 978-3-86391-118-8

=== Games ===
==== Die Känguru-Chroniken ====
- Halt mal kurz!, card game, Kosmos 2016, EAN 4002051740382.
- Game of Quotes, card game, Kosmos 2017, EAN 4002051692926.
- More Game of Quotes card game, Kosmos-Verlag 2019.
- EXIT. Das Spiel: Die Känguru-Eskapaden (with Inka and Markus Brand), Kosmos 2019, EAN 4002051695071.
- Die Würfel-WG, Gesellschaftsspiel (Authors: Johannes Krenner, Alexander Pfister), Kosmos 2019, EAN 4002051693176.
- Voll auf die 18, card game, Pegasus Spiele 2022, EAN 4250231734366.

==== Others ====
- Quiztopia, board games (with Maria Kling), Kosmos 2019, EAN 4002051694296.
- Das NEINhorn, card game, Kosmos 2021, EAN 4002051680848.
- Abrakadabrien, card game (Illustrations: Johannes Lott), Kosmos 2022.

== Filmography ==
- 2020: The Kangaroo Chronicles, German: Die Känguru-Chroniken, writer
- 2022: The Kangaroo Conspiracy, German: Die Känguru-Verschwörung, writer and director

== Awards (selection) ==
2006

- Bielefelder Kabarettpreis 1. Preis
- Grazer Kleinkunstvogel
- Winner of the German National Poetry Slam competition (single)
- Münchner Kabarett Kaktus

2007

- Der Rostocker Koggenzieher in Gold
- Silberner Stuttgarter Besen
- Gewinner der deutschsprachigen Poetry-Slam-Meisterschaften (single)
- Fohlen von Niedersachsen

2010

- Förderpreis Mindener Stichling
- Deutscher Radiopreis in the Best Comedy category for Neues vom Känguru (together with the production team at Radio Fritz)

2011

- Bayerischer Kabarettpreis Senkrechtstarter-Preis

2012

- Deutscher Kleinkunstpreis in the Kleinkunst division

2013

- Deutscher Hörbuchpreis in the Best Audiobook / Best Entertainment category for Die Känguru-Chroniken. Live und ungekürzt

2018

- Hörbuch-Award: QualityLand (Platinum)
- Hörbuch-Award: Die Känguru-Chroniken (7× Gold)
- Hörbuch-Award: Das Känguru-Manifest (2× Platinum)
- Hörbuch-Award: Die Känguru-Offenbarung (2× Platinum)
- Hörbuch-Award: Die Känguru-Apokryphen (Gold)
- Deutscher Science Fiction Preis for QualityLand

2021

- Jonathan-Swift-Preis
