= Heaven (2002 film) =

- Theatrical release poster
- Directed by: Tom Tykwer
- Written by: Krzysztof Kieślowski; Krzysztof Piesiewicz
- Produced by: Stefan Arndt; Frédérique Dumas; William Horberg; Maria Kopf; Anthony Minghella
- Starring: Cate Blanchett; Giovanni Ribisi
- Cinematography: Frank Griebe
- Edited by: Mathilde Bonnefoy
- Production company: X Filme Creative Pool
- Distributed by: Miramax Films (United States); Miramax International (through Buena Vista International, United Kingdom); TFM Distribution (France); X Verleih AG (Germany)
- Release dates: 6 February 2002 (Berlinale); 21 February 2002 (Germany); 9 August 2002 (United Kingdom); 4 October 2002 (United States); 20 November 2002 (France)
- Running time: 96 minutes
- Countries: Germany; France; Italy; United States; United Kingdom
- Languages: English; Italian
- Box office: $784,399

Heaven is a 2002 romantic thriller film directed by Tom Tykwer, starring Cate Blanchett and Giovanni Ribisi. Co-screenwriter Krzysztof Kieślowski intended for it to be the first part of a trilogy (the second being Hell (2005) and the third titled Purgatory), but Kieślowski died before he could complete the project. The film is an international co-production among producers based in Germany, France, Italy, the United States, and the United Kingdom. The dialogue is in Italian and English. It served as the opening film of the 52nd Berlin International Film Festival.

== Plot ==
The film is set in Turin, Italy. It opens with a prologue sequence showing the young Italian Carabinieri clerk Filippo (Ribisi) learning to fly a helicopter using a flight simulator. When he accidentally crashes the virtual helicopter by ascending too dramatically, his instructor tells him, "In a real helicopter, you can't just keep going up and up", prompting Filippo to ask, "How high can I fly?"

The film then cuts to Philippa (Blanchett), who is preparing to plant a bomb in the downtown office of a high-ranking businessman. Although everything goes according to her plan, the garbage bin in which she places the bomb is emptied by a cleaner immediately after she leaves and later explodes in an elevator, killing four people.

Philippa is tracked down by the Carabinieri, arrested, and brought to the station where Filippo works. When she is questioned, she reveals that she is an English teacher at a local school where several students have recently died of drug-related causes. Discovering that they had all been supplied by the same local cartel, she had contacted the Carabinieri with the names of the drug ring leaders, begging them to intervene, but was repeatedly ignored.

At her wits' end, she decided to kill the leader of the cartel, the businessman whose office she targeted. In the process of her interrogation, Filippo (who is translating her confession for his superiors) falls in love with Philippa and helps her escape from Carabinieri custody. After she kills the drug lord who was her original target, the pair become fugitives from the law and flee to the countryside, where they eventually find refuge with one of Philippa's friends and finally consummate their relationship.

When the authorities raid the house where they are hiding, the fugitives steal a Carabinieri helicopter parked on the front lawn and escape by air. The officers on the ground fire repeatedly at them, to no avail, as the craft climbs higher and higher and finally disappears.

== Cast ==
- Cate Blanchett as Philippa
- Giovanni Ribisi as Filippo
- Remo Girone as The Father
- Stefania Rocca as Regina
- Alessandro Sperduti as Ariel

== Critical reception ==
Heaven received generally positive reviews from critics. On review aggregator website Rotten Tomatoes, the film has a 73% approval rating, based on 88 reviews, with an average rating of 6.7/10. The site's critical consensus reads, "The story is the weakest link in this gorgeous and well-acted film." Metacritic assigned the film a weighted average score of 68 out of 100, based on 31 critics, indicating "generally favorable" reviews.

Though comparisons abound to Kieślowski's earlier films, Roger Ebert also saw a similarity to Tykwer's Run Lola Run and The Princess and the Warrior. Though Heaven is "more thoughtful, proceeds more deliberately, than the mercurial haste" of Tykwer's films, "it contains the same sort of defiant romanticism, in which a courageous woman tries to alter her fate by sheer willpower." Stephen Holden of The New York Times praised Cate Blanchett's performance, as well as the film's "extraordinary visual imagery" and dream-like aesthetic, describing the creative partnership behind the film as "a much more harmonious posthumous collaboration than the powerful but ungainly collision of Steven Spielberg's crowd-pleasing and Stanley Kubrick's misanthropic sensibilities in ''A.I.: Artificial Intelligence.'' Here the clinical, stopwatch precision of Mr. Tykwer's explorations of synchronicity and Kieslowski's warmer, metaphysically dreamy speculations about the role of chance and coincidence in human affairs synchronize into a film whose formal elegance is matched by its depth of feeling."
