= Netta Garti =

Israeli actress

- נטע גרטי
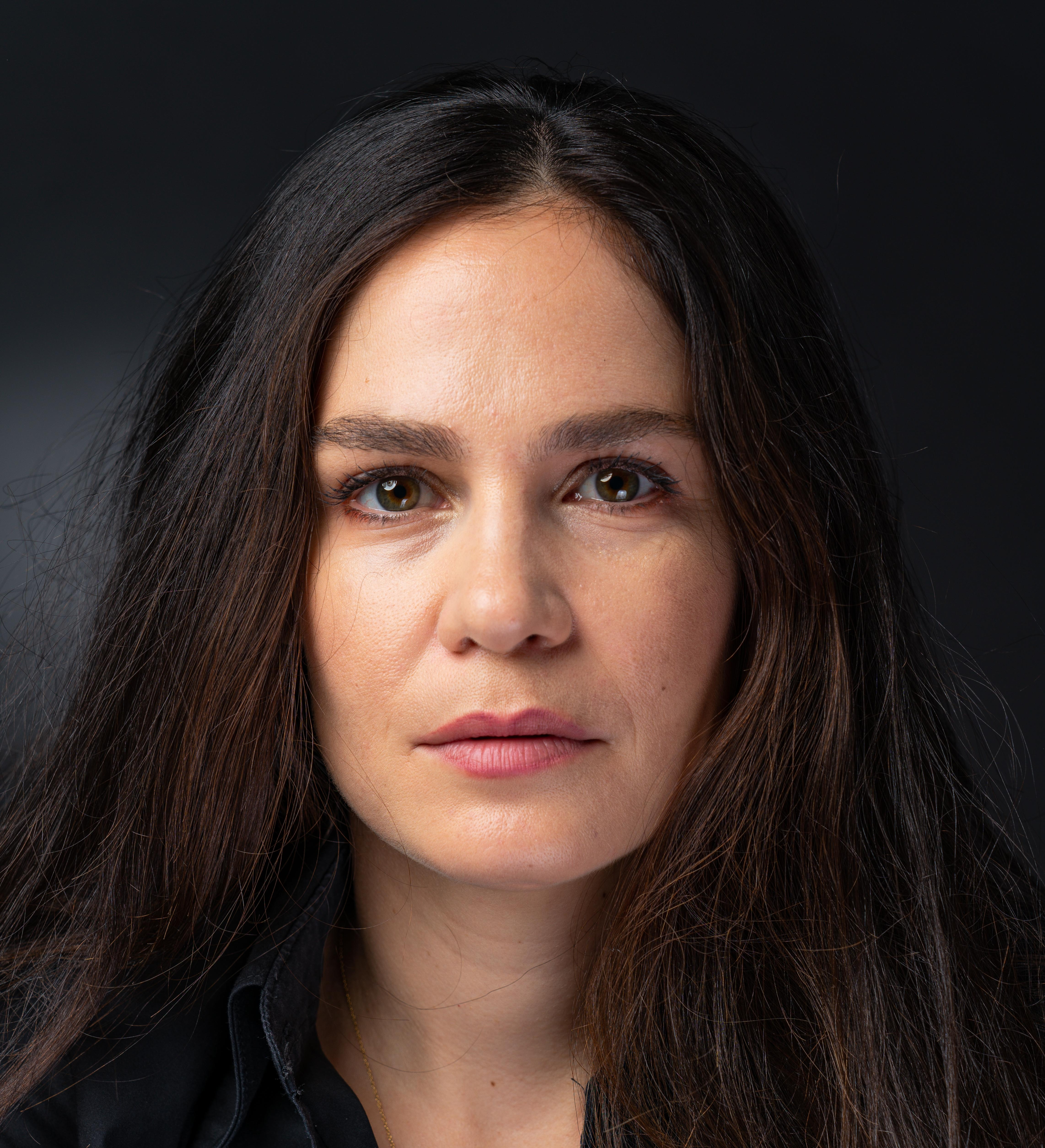
- Garti in 2022
- Born: Netta Garti; 20 March 1980 (age 46); Tel Aviv, Israel
- Occupation: Actress

Netta Garti (or Neta Garty; Hebrew: נטע גרטי; born 20 March 1980) is an Israeli actress.

== Biography ==
Garti was born in and lives in Tel Aviv, Israel, to a Bulgarian Jewish family.

She played the role of Cookie in the Israeli television series The Arbitrator. She has twice received Awards of the Israeli Film Academy nominations; a 2004 'Best Actress' nomination for her role as Nicole Shushan in Turn Left at the End of the World, and a 2007 'Best Supporting Actress' nomination for her role as Young Rachel Brener in The Debt. She also had a starring role in the 2007 film Love Life directed by Maria Schrader.

She plays the wife of an Israeli undercover counterterrorism officer in the Israeli political thriller television series Fauda.

In 2021, she took part in the second season of The Singer in the Mask as the Oyster and was the fourteenth contestant eliminated.

== Filmography ==
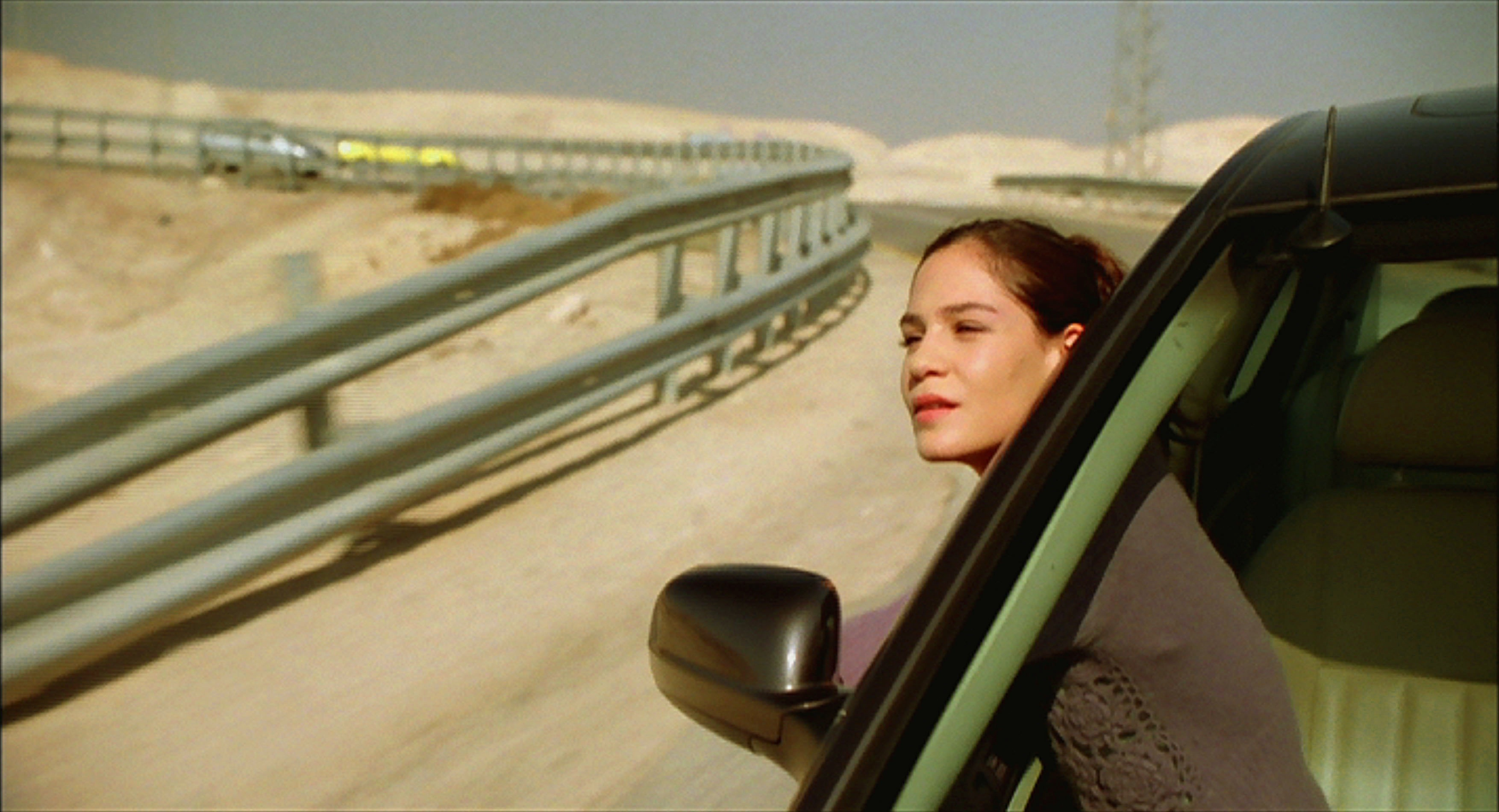
Netta Garti in Love Life (2007)

- Ha-Chevre Ha-Tovim (TV series) as Li
- Turn Left at the End of the World (2004) as Nicole Shushan
- Tropic of Venus (2005) as Noga Kochavi
- Love Life (2007) as Ya'ara
- Rak Klavim Ratzim Hofshi (2007)
- The Debt (2007) as young Rachel Brener
- The Arbitrator (TV series) as Limor 'Cookie' Goldman
- Fauda (TV series) as Gali Kabilio
- Come Closer (2024) as Mother
