= Love Life (2007 film) =

- Original film poster
- Directed by: Maria Schrader
- Screenplay by: Maria Schrader and Laila Stieler
- Based on: Love Life by Zeruya Shalev
- Starring: Netta Garti; Rade Sherbedgia
- Cinematography: Benedict Neuenfels
- Edited by: Antje Zynga
- Music by: Niki Reiser
- Production companies: X-Filme Creative Pool; Transfax Film Production; BR; Arte
- Distributed by: X Verleih AG (through Warner Bros. Pictures)
- Release date: 2007
- Countries: Germany; Israel

Love Life (known as Liebesleben in German) is a 2007 German/Israeli film directed by Maria Schrader and shot in Israel. It is based on a novel by Zeruya Shalev, with the screenplay written by Schrader and Laila Stieler. The film won two 2008 Bavarian Film Awards for Best Cinematography (Benedict Neuenfels) and Best Music (Niki Reiser). Neuenfels also won the 2008 German Film Award for Best Cinematography.

== Cast ==
- Netta Garti as Ya'ara
- Rade Sherbedgia as Arie
- Tovah Feldshuh as Hannah
- Stephen Singer as Leon
- Ishai Golan as Joni
- Aryeh Moskona as Nathan
- Caroline Silhol as Josephine
- Assi Dayan as Jara's Professor
- Clara Khoury as Shira
- Gillian Buick as Vivien
- Zach Cohen as Cat Killer
- Leonie Kranzle as Kenneth
- Zeruya Shalev as Librarian
- Esther Zewko as Guest

== Awards and nominations ==
- 2008: Benedict Neuenfels won Best Cionematography award for the film in German Film Awards
- 2008: Christian M. Goldbeck nominated for Best Production Design for the film in German Film Awards
- 2008: Benedict Neuenfels won Best Cionematography award for the film in the Bavarian Film Awards
- 2008: Niki Reiser won Best Music award for the film in the Bavarian Film Awards

== Soundtrack ==
Liebesleben

Soundtrack album
- Released: 2007 CD
- Genre: Soundtrack
- Label: Normal (Indigo)

A soundtrack album was released containing the following:

1. Love Life
2. Attracted to Arie
3. "If She Had Chosen You..."
4. "This Is My Life"
5. Jara
6. "Don't Forget to Exhale"
7. Abused
8. Finding the Truth
9. The Desert
10. Bewildered
11. Caught
12. The Photo
13. Jara's Quest
14. Road to Akko
