= My Führer – The Really Truest Truth about Adolf Hitler =

2007 German comedy-drama film

Mein Führer – Die wirklich wahrste Wahrheit über Adolf Hitler
- Film poster
- Directed by: Dani Levy
- Written by: Dani Levy
- Produced by: Stefan Arndt
- Starring: Helge Schneider; Ulrich Mühe
- Cinematography: Carl-Friedrich Koschnick; Carsten Thiele
- Edited by: Peter R. Adam
- Music by: Niki Reiser
- Production company: X Filme Creative Pool
- Distributed by: X Verleih AG (through Warner Bros.)
- Release date: 11 January 2007
- Running time: 89 minutes
- Country: Germany
- Language: German

My Führer – The Really Truest Truth About Adolf Hitler (German: Mein Führer – Die wirklich wahrste Wahrheit über Adolf Hitler) is a 2007 German black comedy film directed by Dani Levy.

The setting is World War II, around New Year's of 1945. The film tells the story of Adolf Hitler and his preparation for a big New Year's speech. Hitler is too depressed to speak with the tide of the war turning against Germany, so a Jewish acting coach is called in to tutor him.

The premiere was held on 9 January 2007 in Essen. Wide German release followed on 11 January and Swiss and Austrian releases on 18 and 19 January, respectively. It was entered into the 29th Moscow International Film Festival.

== Plot ==
Professor Adolf Grünbaum, a Jewish renowned actor, introduces the story as the narrator. He wants to tell people his story, which he says may never appear in a history book.

Grünbaum is imprisoned in Sachsenhausen concentration camp with his wife and four children. In the meantime, Adolf Hitler lives in the New Reich Chancellery in bombed-out Berlin. The German propaganda machine around Reich Propaganda Minister Joseph Goebbels is preparing a mass event in Berlin's Lustgarten for New Year's Day 1945 to give the war-weary Germans new motivation. Hitler however himself is weak and confused. Grünbaum is thus released from the concentration camp to get Hitler back in shape, and to motivate him and support him as a teacher. After an initial rejection, Hitler increasingly trusts his mentor and reveals personal feelings and childhood memories to him. Grünbaum is engaged in internal conflict and repeatedly considers killing Hitler; paradoxically, he even thwarted an attempted murder of Hitler and reminded his wife that the Führer was also a victim of his childhood.

During Grünbaum's meetings with Hitler, the two are observed and wiretapped by numerous leaders. Together with the Minister of the Interior and Reichsführer SS Heinrich Himmler, Goebbels plans an assassination attempt on Hitler, which is to take place during the New Year's address, as part of a "staged reality". A bomb is to be placed under Hitler's lectern and the blame placed on Grünbaum, who is now close to Hitler. This attack is intended to strengthen the hatred of the Jews in the German people and thus contribute to the success of the war.

On the day of the speech, Hitler becomes so hoarse that he loses his voice. On Hitler's route through Berlin from the Reich Chancellery to the Lustgarten, destroyed buildings are reconstructed using panel-shaped wooden structures, so as to portray an undamaged Berlin in the film Goebbels has planned for the occasion. Grünbaum, standing under the podium, is coerced into giving the speech while Hitler ad-libs and gesticulates. Grünbaum deviates from the planned text and begins mocking Hitler before he is shot, while Hitler flees the lectern just before the bomb explodes.

Fatally injured, Grünbaum predicts that the war will soon be over and that the Führer will eventually take his own life. He notes that in a hundred years, historians will still be writing about Hitler and actors will portray him, because people will want to understand the atrocities of the Nazi regime.
