= Werner Abrolat =

German actor (1924–1997)

- Werner Abrolat as Slim, Member of Indio's Gang in For a Few Dollars More (1965)
- Born: Werner Abrolat; 15 August 1924; Tilsit, East Prussia
- Died: 24 August 1997 (aged 73); Munich, Germany
- Other name: Werner Aprelat
- Occupation: Actor
- Years active: 1949–1997

Werner Abrolat (15 August 1924 – 24 August 1997) was a German actor who was active in both Germany and in several international co-productions.

After a long career at provincial theatres in West-Germany, Abrolat appeared in a number of Spaghetti Westerns in the mid-1960s (notably the 1965 Sergio Leone film For a Few Dollars More where he played a member of Indio's gang). Work on German TV included guest roles on the West German crime drama series Tatort.

In the early 1970s he contributed to a number of films as a voice actor, e.g providing the voice for the character of Tjure in Vicky the Viking. He played the police commissioner in 00 Schneider – Jagd auf Nihil Baxter (1994). From the mid-1970s, he mostly appeared in German films and on German television until his death in 1997.

== Filmography ==
Year	Title	Role	Note
1949	Love '47		
1965	For a Few Dollars More	Slim (Indio's Gang)	Uncredited
1966	The Fountain of Love	John	
1966	The Trap Snaps Shut at Midnight	Krot	
1968	Engelchen	TV-Announcer and Creditor	Voice
1968	Otto ist auf Frauen scharf	Major Kroll	
1968	Rinaldo Rinaldini	Cintio	TV series, 13 episodes
1969	Up the Establishment	Aufdringlicher Herr auf Orgie	
1969	The Castle of Fu Manchu	Melnik	
1970	Student of the Bedroom	Aggressiver Mann im Zoo	Uncredited
1970	The Bloody Judge	Inquisitor Matt	Uncredited
1970	We'll Take Care of the Teachers	Polizist – Alkoholkontrolle	
1970	Seventeen and Anxious		Uncredited
1970	Sensational Janine	Horak	
1970	De 5 i fedtefadet	Johnny	
1971	Hurray We Are Bachelors Again	Hotel Manager	Uncredited
1971	Josefine Mutzenbacher II – Meine 365 Liebhaber	Kammerdiener / Lechner	
1971	Office Girls	Photograph	
1971	Aunt Trude from Buxtehude	Mr. Preissen	
1971	Holiday Report	Wieland	
1972	Schulmädchen-Report. 3. Teil: Was Eltern nicht mal ahnen	Kemper	Uncredited
1972	The Stuff That Dreams Are Made Of	Kriminalrat Hering	Voice, Uncredited
1973	Was Schulmädchen verschweigen	Arzt in schönheitsfarm	Uncredited
1975	The Maddest Car in the World	Preisüberreicher	Voice, Uncredited
1976	Derrick	Herr Vogt	TV series, 2 episodes
1976	Rosemary's Daughter	Polizist mit Megaphon	
1977	The Expulsion from Paradise	Regisseur im Aufzug	
1990	Herzlich willkommen	Pförtner	
1991	Keep on Running	Direktor	
1993	Texas – Doc Snyder hält die Welt in Atem	Sheriff	
1994	00 Schneider – Jagd auf Nihil Baxter	Polizeipräsident	
1995	After Five in the Forest Primeval	Tanzlehrer	
1996	Das Zauberbuch	Spucki	
1997	Praxis Dr. Hasenbein	Käsemann	
