= Little Thirteen =

- Directed by: Christian Klandt
- Written by: Catrin Lüth
- Produced by: Stefan Arndt; Andrea Schütte
- Starring: Muriel Wimmer, Antonia Putiloff, Joseph Konrad Bundschuh
- Cinematography: Andreas Hartmann
- Edited by: Ben Laser
- Production companies: X Filme Creative Pool; Das Kleine Fernsehspiel (ZDF); Hochschule für Film und Fernsehen 'Konrad Wolf'
- Distributed by: X Verleih AG (through Warner Bros.)
- Release dates: 30 June 2012 (Filmfest München); 5 July 2012 (Germany)
- Running time: 90 minutes
- Country: Germany
- Language: German
- Budget: €450,000 (estimated)

Little Thirteen is a 2012 German drama film directed by Christian Klandt. The film stars Muriel Wimmer as one of three troubled teenagers from different social backgrounds who face various challenges.

== Synopsis ==
Thirteen-year-old Sarah (Muriel Wimmer) is no stranger to sex and one-night stands, nor is her 16-year-old best friend Charly (Antonia Putiloff). Only when Sarah meets the older Lukas (Joseph Konrad Bundschuh) online does she begin to desire something beyond casual hookups, but is that what Lukas wants? At the same time, Charly has to figure out what she is to do about her pregnancy and her desire to find a father for the unborn child.

== Cast ==
- Muriel Wimmer as Sarah
- Antonia Putiloff as Charly
- Joseph Konrad Bundschuh as Lukas (as Joseph Bundschuh)
- Isabell Gerschke as Doreen
- Philipp Kubitza as Diggnsäck
- Gerdy Zint as Maik
- Gisa Flake as Yvonne
- Chiron Elias Krase as Robert
- Pelagia Kapoglou as Nele
- Claudia Geisler as Silke, Lukas' Mutter
- Thomas Bading as Martin, Lukas' Vater

== Production ==
To accompany the underaged actresses Muriel Wimmer and Antonia Putiloff during the shooting of their nude and sex scenes, director Christian Klandt and his film team were supported by two sex-education specialists from 'pro familia Berlin'.

== Reception ==
Berliner Zeitung panned the film, calling it a "barren, tensionless film" and saying that it was "as ambitious as it is hollow". In contrast, n-tv gave a more favorable review.

=== Awards ===
- German Cinema New Talent Award - Best Performance for actress Antonia Putiloff at the Filmfest München (2012, won)
