= Silent Night (1995 film) =

1995 film

- DVD Cover
- Directed by: Dani Levy
- Written by: Maria Schrader; Klaus Chatten
- Produced by: Dani Levy
- Starring: Maria Schrader; Jürgen Vogel
- Cinematography: Carl-Friedrich Koschnick
- Edited by: Dani Levy
- Music by: Niki Reiser
- Production companies: X-Filme Creative Pool; Fool Film; Fama Film AG
- Distributed by: Buena Vista International
- Release date: 16 February 1996 (Berlin International Film Festival)
- Running time: 87 minutes
- Countries: Germany; Switzerland
- Language: German

Silent Night (German: Stille Nacht) is a 1995 German-Swiss drama film directed by Dani Levy. Set over Christmas Eve, it follows an art student caught between her partner and her lover. The film was screened in competition at the 46th Berlin International Film Festival, where it received an Honourable Mention, and later screened at festivals including Montreal, Geneva, Vancouver, Solothurn, and Göteborg.

== Synopsis ==
On Christmas Eve, Julia, an art student, lives with her partner Christian, a police detective, while also having an affair with Frank, a young bartender. As Julia decides to end the affair and Frank plans to declare his love, Christian’s actions lead to a night of emotional conflict.

== Cast ==
The cast includes:

- Maria Schrader as Julia
- Mark Schlichter as Christian
- Jürgen Vogel as Frank
- Ingrid Caven as Singer
- Maurice Lamy as Page

== Production ==
Filming took place from 27 January to 10 March 1995 in Paris, Berlin, and Potsdam.

== Reception ==
=== Awards and nominations ===
The film won awards for Best Music and Best Cinematography at the 1997 Bayerischer Filmpreis. It also received an Honourable Mention (Alfred Bauer Prize) at the 1996 Berlin International Film Festival.

=== Critical response ===
Filmdienst wrote that the film had a consistent visual style, but found the story less fully developed. Der Spiegel described it as a Christmas Eve drama about a love triangle and wrote that audiences stayed away when the film became more introspective.

== Festival screenings ==
The film premiered in February 1996. Later festival screenings included the 1996 Montreal World Film Festival, the 1996 Geneva International Film Festival, the 1996 Vancouver International Film Festival, the 1997 Solothurn Film Festival, and the 1997 Göteborg Film Festival.
