= Scott Campbell (author) =

American writer

- Born: March 24, 1945 (age 81)
- Education: Miami University, Vermont College
- Occupation: Author

Scott Campbell (born March 24, 1945, in Michigan) is an American writer. He lives in Boston and works as Director of Communications in the MIT School of Architecture and Planning. Campbell holds a master's in creative writing from Vermont College.

== Early life ==
Scott Campbell received his undergraduate degree in English from Ohio University, completed his graduate work in Public Communications at Boston University, and completed his education with a master's in creative writing from Vermont College.

== Career ==
Campbell's early career spans from being a producer for a Boston ad agency to a talent agent while as a restaurant waiter before pursuing his freelance writing. Campbell has taught writing at MIT and Emerson College. He lives in Jamaica Plain, Boston, and works as Director of Communications in the School of Architecture and Planning. His book Aftermath, which was inspired by trending suicides in the gay community, was filmed by Caroline Link in 2008 in Germany as A Year Ago in Winter (German: Im Winter ein Jahr). he also wrote the book Touched in 1996.

== Bibliography ==
- Scott Campbell: Aftermath (novel) 2009, ISBN 1-4392-1076-4
- Scott Campbell: Touched (novel) 1996, ISBN 0-553-37822-8
- Scott Campbell, Phyllis R. Silverman: Widower: When Men are Left Alone, 1987, ISBN 0-89503-286-4
