= Life Is Too Long =

- Theatrical Release Poster
- Directed by: Dani Levy
- Written by: Dani Levy
- Produced by: Manuela Stehr
- Starring: Markus Hering; Meret Becker; Veronica Ferres; Hannah Levy; David Schlichter
- Cinematography: Carl-Friedrich Koschnick
- Edited by: Elena Bromund
- Music by: Niki Reiser
- Production companies: X-Filme Creative Pool; Warner Bros. Film Productions Germany
- Distributed by: X-Verleih (though Warner Bros.)
- Release date: 26 August 2010
- Country: Germany
- Language: German
- Box office: $976,620

Life Is Too Long (German: Das Leben ist zu lang) is a 2010 German comedy drama film, written and directed by Dani Levy. It was released on August 26, 2010, by Warner Bros. Pictures.

== Plot ==
Alfi Seliger, a 52-year-old Jewish filmmaker, describes himself as a "Nebbich", a Yiddish term for a failure. He is going through a personal and professional crisis. His wife Helena, a voice actress who largely supports the family, feels neglected and is having an affair with her director Johannes. Their children, Romy and Alain, are teenagers who despise their father, while his eccentric mother, a former film star, constantly bothers him with phone calls and melodramatic appearances. Alfi has also been unable to make a successful film since his comedy Das blaue Wunder several years earlier.

He spends his time attending parties in the hope of finding producers interested in his screenplay about the cartoon controversy, provisionally titled Mo-ha-hammed. Tired of making light comedies, Alfi wants to approach a serious subject through humor. His efforts finally seem successful when he meets Natasha, the amorous Russian wife of influential film producer Miesbach-Boronowski. She persuades her husband to sign a contract with Alfi, while demanding the female lead for herself.

To raise money for his project, Alfi reluctantly accepts a well-paid job directing episodes of a soap opera. He is fired after making excessive demands on the actors. Meanwhile, a series of misfortunes follows him: he breaks his leg and hand and undergoes a gastrointestinal examination by Professor Mohr, during which he is diagnosed with cancer. He later recovers after surgery. Miesbach-Boronowski then deceives him by exploiting a clause in the contract that Alfi had overlooked. His screenplay is turned into an RTL series about a cartoonist. To make matters worse, an incompetent financial adviser nearly causes him to lose his entire fortune.

Only Caro, a young soap-opera actress and the mistress of aging film star Georg Maria Stahl, seems to understand Alfi's troubles. During a late-night meeting at a brine bath, the two become close, although their relationship remains platonic. Caro is also the only person who accepts Alfi's sudden realization that he, she, and everyone around them are merely characters in a film.

The story then takes a surreal turn. Alfi breaks away from the screenplay, searches for the director and screenwriter responsible for his life, and confronts him about his fate. As the boundaries between reality, dreams, and fiction increasingly disappear, Alfi attempts suicide by taking large quantities of sleeping pills and tranquilizers, together with alcohol and cleaning products. His therapist, Tabatabai, had suggested this as a last resort. The attempt nevertheless fails, and after several days in a coma, Alfi awakens in Professor Mohr's clinic and reconciles with his wife.

After appearing at the Venice Film Festival as a celebrated director—although it remains unclear whether the event is real or a dream—Alfi takes part in a remarkable family reunion. His mother reveals that she was once Miesbach-Boronowski's lover and that Alfi is his son. Following further chaotic and confusing events, Alfi eventually finds himself in bed with his wife.

== Cast ==
- Markus Hering as Alfi Seliger
- Meret Becker as Helena Seliger
- Veronica Ferres as Natasha
- Hannah Levy as Romy Seliger
- David Schlichter as Alain Seliger
- Hans Hollmann as Holger Miesbach-Boronowski
- Yvonne Catterfeld as Caro Will
- Gottfried John as Georg Maria Stahl
