= Meschugge =

1998 film

- Directed by: Dani Levy
- Written by: Dani Levy; Maria Schrader
- Produced by: Stefan Arndt
- Music by: Niki Reiser
- Distributed by: Jugendfilm; 20th Century Fox
- Release date: 1998
- Running time: 107 minutes
- Country: Germany
- Languages: English; German

Meschugge (English title: The Giraffe) is a 1998 German thriller film directed by Dani Levy and set during World War II. The German title translates as "crazy". The English title refers to the nickname of a character who was once in charge of the Treblinka extermination camp. The film mainly uses English dialogue, though it contains German dialogue as well.

== Cast ==
- Maria Schrader as Lena Katz
- Lukas Ammann as Eliah Goldberg
- Lynn Cohen as Mrs. Fish
- Dani Levy as David Fish
- David Strathairn as Charles Kaminski
- Nicole Heesters as Lena's mother

== Reception ==
Variety gave a mixed review, calling the film "slickly shot" though criticising the plot and dialogue as "ordinary". The New York Times was much more critical, stating the English dialogue seemed like "badly translated German" and the plots "breathless incoherence [was] matched only by its wild implausibility."
