= Helge Schneider =

German entertainer (born 1955)

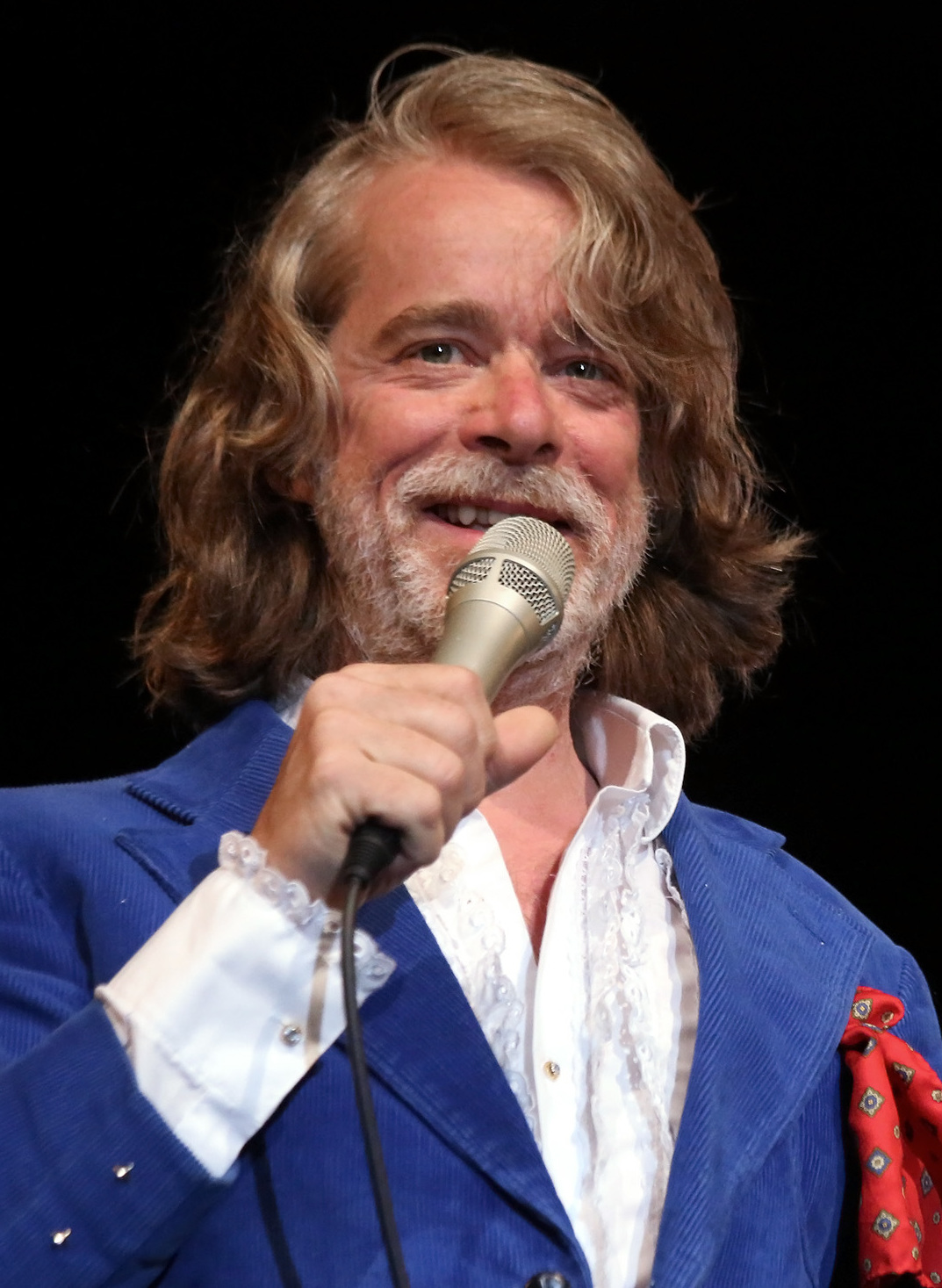

Background information
- Born: 30 August 1955 (age 69); Mülheim an der Ruhr, West Germany
- Genres: Comedy; pop; jazz; free improvisation; spoken word
- Occupations: Comedian; musician; composer; entertainer; actor; author; director
- Instruments: Vocals; piano; keyboards; guitar; drums; violin; cello; double bass; vibraphone; saxophone; trumpet; flute; accordion; percussion
- Years active: 1977–present
- Website: helge-schneider.de

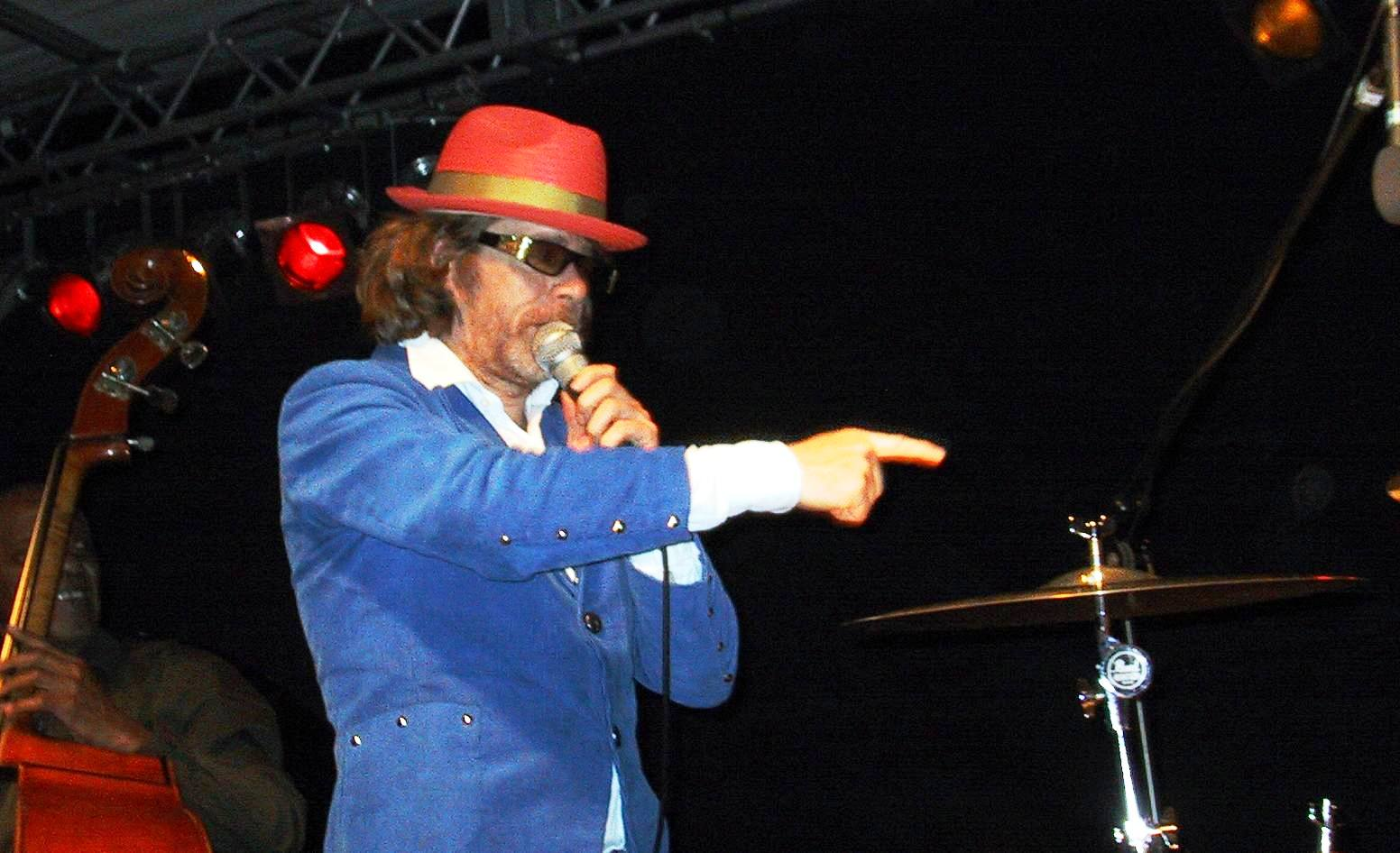
Schneider in 2002

Helge Schneider (born 30 August 1955 in Mülheim an der Ruhr) is a German entertainer, comedian, musician, composer, author, film and theatre director, actor, and screenwriter. He frequently appears on German television and is probably best known for his novelty song Katzeklo (Kitty Litter Box): “Katzeklo, Katzeklo, ja das macht die Katze froh” (“Kitty litter tray, kitty litter tray, that’s what makes the kitty gay [happy]”), which spent 17 weeks on the German music charts in 1994, peaking at number 13.

Despite his success with comedy music, Schneider is also a recognised jazz musician. He learned to play the piano as a child and taught himself numerous instruments in his youth.

In addition to several music albums, Schneider has also published audiobooks and radio plays.

== Discography ==
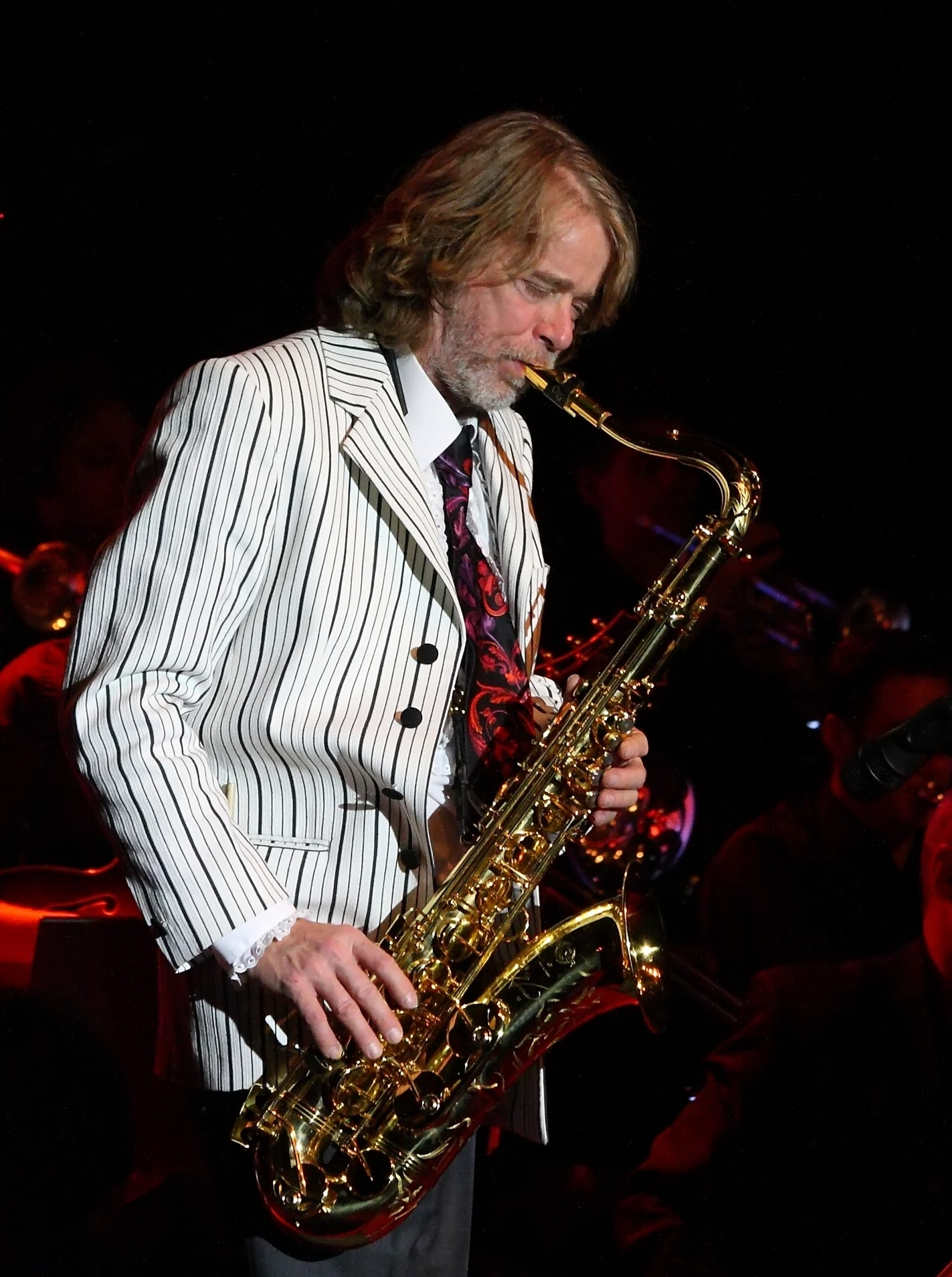
Schneider in 2013

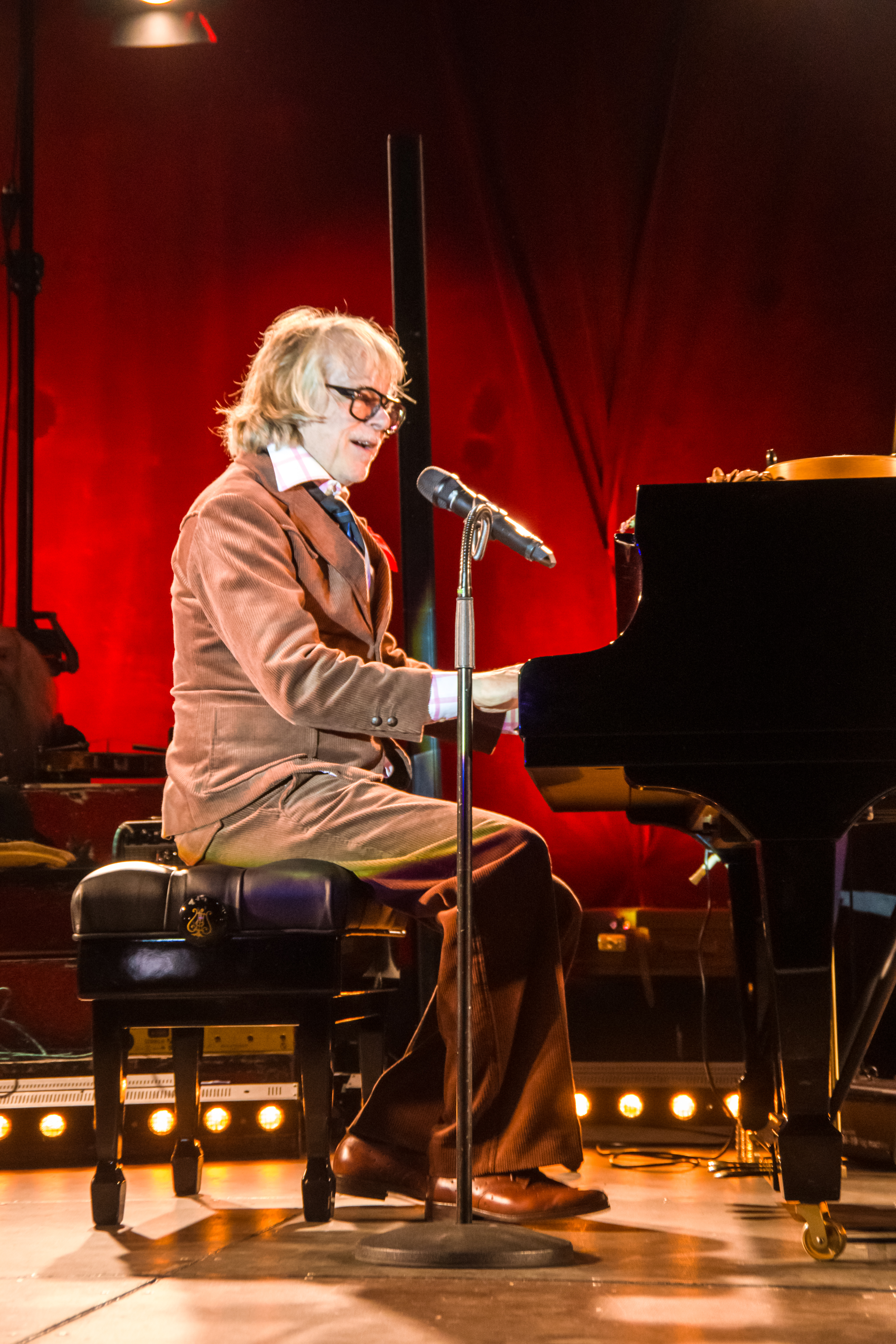
Schneider in 2022

=== Music albums ===
- 1987: The Last Jazz
- 1989: Seine größten Erfolge (“His greatest hits”)
- 1990: New York, I’m Coming
- 1992: Guten Tach (“Hello there”)
- 1993: Es gibt Reis, Baby (“We’re gonna have some rice, baby”)
- 1995: Es rappelt im Karton (“Rumble in the cardboard box”)
- 1997: Da Humm!
- 1998: Helge 100% live – The Berlin Tapes (live album)
- 1999: Eiersalat in Rock (“Egg salad in rock”, released as Helge and the Firefuckers)
- 1999: Jazz (& Hardcore)
- 2000: Hefte raus – Klassenarbeit! (live album; “Workbooks out – exam time!”)
- 2003: Out of Kaktus! (Songs aus dem Kaktus) (“Songs from the cactus”)
- 2004: Füttern verboten (live album; “Please don’t feed”)
- 2007: I Brake Together (a complex German-English wordplay: The German expression for “I am collapsing” (“Ich breche zusammen”) can be literally translated as “I break (not: brake) together”)
- 2007: Akopalüze Nau (live album; parody of Apocalypse Now)
- 2013: Sommer, Sonne, Kaktus (“Summer, sun, cactus”)
- 2014: Live at the Grugahalle – 20 Jahre Katzeklo (Evolution!) (live album)
- 2017: Heart Attack No. 1 (feat. Pete York)
- 2019: Partypeople (beim Fleischer) (“Partypeople (At the Butcher)”)
- 2020: Mama
- 2021: Die Reaktion – The Last Jazz, Vol. II
- 2023: Torero
- 2023: Live in Graz (live album)

=== Other recordings ===
- 1991: Hörspiele Vol. 1 (1979–1984) (radio plays)
- 1992: Hörspiele Vol. 2 (1985–1987) (radio plays)
- 1998: Martin, sein Vater und die vertraute Stimme (radio play; “Martin, his father and the familiar voice”)
- 1999: Liest: Eiersalat – Eine Frau Geht Seinen Weg (audiobook; “Reads: Egg salad – A woman goes his way”, the wrong pronoun is intentional)
- 2004: Mendy – Das Wusical
- 2004: Aprikose Banane Erdbeer (audiobook; “Apricot banana strawberry”)
- 2005: Globus Dei – Vom Nordpol bis Patagonien (audiobook; “From the North Pole to Patagonia”)
- 2007: Die Memoiren des Rodriguez Faszanatas (audiobook; “The memoirs of Rodriguez Faszanatas”)
- 2009: Bonbon aus Wurst (“Sweet made from sausage”)
- 2011: Satan Loco

== Filmography ==
=== As director and actor ===
- 1982: The Privatier (not published)
- 1987: Stangenfieber (Stick fever)
- 1993: Texas – Doc Snyder hält die Welt in Atem (Texas – Doc Snyder sets the world aghast)
- 1994: 00 Schneider – Jagd auf Nihil Baxter (00 Schneider – The hunt for Nihil Baxter)
- 1996: Praxis Dr. Hasenbein (Dr. Hareleg's Practice)
- 2004: Jazzclub – Der frühe Vogel fängt den Wurm (Jazzclub – The early bird catches the worm)
- 2013: 00 Schneider – Im Wendekreis der Eidechse (The Tropic of Gecko)

=== As actor ===
- 1986: Johnny Flash as Johnny Flash
- 1991: Manta – Der Film as himself
- 1994: Felidae as Jesaja (voice only)
- 1996: Kleines Arschloch as Alter Sack (voice only)
- 1999: Käpt’n Blaubär – Der Film (voice only)
- 2004: 7 Dwarves – Men Alone in the Wood as “The White (or Wise) Helge”
- 2004: Traumschiff Surprise – Periode 1 (singing)
- 2006: Das kleine Arschloch und der alte Sack – Sterben ist Scheiße as Alter Sack (voice only)
- 2006: 7 Dwarves: The Forest Is Not Enough as “The White (or Wise) Helge”
- 2007: Mein Führer – Die wirklich wahrste Wahrheit über Adolf Hitler as Adolf Hitler
- 2009: Die PARTEI as himself
- 2020: The Kangaroo Chronicles as fitness coach
