= Alles auf Zucker! =

2004 German comedy film

- Alles auf Zucker! film poster
- Directed by: Dani Levy
- Written by: Dani Levy; Holger Franke
- Produced by: Manuela Stehr
- Starring: Henry Hübchen; Hannelore Elsner; Udo Samel; Gołda Tencer; Steffen Groth
- Cinematography: Carl-Friedrich Koschnick
- Edited by: Elena Bromund
- Music by: Niki Reiser
- Distributed by: X Verleih AG (through Warner Bros.
- Release date: 31 December 2004 (Germany)
- Running time: 90 minutes
- Country: Germany
- Language: German

Alles auf Zucker! (German: Go for Zucker!) is a German comedy film, released internationally in 2004. It can be seen as part of the "Ossi-Wessi" confrontation within Germany. Directed by Dani Levy, the cast includes Henry Hübchen, Hannelore Elsner, Udo Samel, Gołda Tencer and Steffen Groth.

Director Dani Levy, himself Jewish, has made an ironic comedy about modern Jewish identity in present-day Germany. Henry Hübchen stars as Jaecki Zucker.

== Cast ==
- Henry Hübchen as Jakob "Jaeckie Zucker" Zuckermann
- Hannelore Elsner as Marlene Zucker
- Udo Samel as Samuel Zuckermann
- Gołda Tencer as Golda Zuckermann
- Steffen Groth as Thomas Zuckermann
- Anja Franke as Jana Zuckermann
- Sebastian Blomberg as Joshua Zuckermann
- Elena Uhlig as Lilly Zuckermann
- Rolf Hoppe as Rabbi Ernst Ginsberg
- Inga Busch as Irene
- Andreas Herder as Gay male nurse
- Renate Krößner
- Klaus Wowereit as Himself

== Plot and details ==
Jakob Zuckermann alias Jaeckie Zucker is Jewish. But he says he's got nothing to do with "that club", ever since his mother and his little brother left him behind the Iron Curtain in East Germany when he was young. Therefore, when he learns of the death of his mother, he does not care. However he has to care. His younger brother pays him a visit with his family, because according to Jewish tradition, they have to observe the seven-day Shiv'ah period of mourning, and their Mamme's will requires them to reconcile in the presence of the rabbi and the family. If they fail, her assets will be bestowed upon the Jewish community of Berlin, and not them.

Most of the scenes were shot at Tegel Airport, Karl-Marx-Allee, Alexanderplatz, Oranienburger Straße and the Jewish Cemetery Weißensee in Berlin. The Mayor of Berlin Klaus Wowereit makes a cameo appearance as himself.

Polish actress Golda Tencer does not speak German, even though she spoke her own lines fluently. She had the German text written down on small pieces of paper, hidden in her purse. During the movie she can sometimes be seen looking down into her purse.

The soundtrack by Niki Reiser is light and jovial, featuring some klezmer music as well.

== Overview ==
The movie was co-funded by the television channels Arte and the WDR. It is one of the very few movies about German Judaism that does not have the Shoah in the centre, but is a comedy about the crazy twists and turns of fate that befall a family that finds itself again. The two Jewish families are more symbolic of the current problems and past tragedies of the division of Germany between East and West, and how the country and its people are struggling to find to each other again. This division affected every German, regardless of their religion. The film depicts in a comic manner the divisions within Judaism between a secularised Jew from the former GDR who has to reconcile himself with his Orthodox brother from the West.

The film has been termed "an audacious, politically incorrect, self-ironical Jewish comedy". It was critically acclaimed in Germany and won a number of awards, most notably the 2005 Deutscher Filmpreis in several categories.
