= Andreas Kunze =

German actor and photographer

Andreas Kunze (1952 in Bremen – 8 April 2010 in Essen) was a German actor and photographer.
