= Linguistic criticism =

Linguistic criticism is probably the oldest form of biblical criticism or textual criticism to develop. It relies heavily upon the study and knowledge of the Biblical languages - not just Koine Greek and Hebrew, but also Aramaic (the language Jesus himself most likely spoke) and Egyptian (Moses' mother tongue).

Besides the influence that Aramaic and Egyptian would have on particular texts, i.e. the words we have written down in the extant Hebrew and Greek manuscripts being shaped into that form after first being contrived in the minds of writers whose mother tongues were Aramaic and Egyptian, we also have portions of texts written directly in those languages.

There are numerous Egyptian loanwords in the Torah. For instance, in the account of Moses being placed in the river in an ark (basket) behind the bullrushes (Sh'mot/Exodus 2:3), the words for ark, river, and bullrushes are all transliterated into Hebrew from Egyptian. Yahuda counts at least eighteen Egyptian loanwords in the full account of Moses’ infancy. Large sections of Daniel and Ezra, as well as portions of Jeremiah and Nehemiah are written directly in Aramaic, as well as a few phrases found in the Synoptic Gospels and the Pauline epistles. Other languages that are very important for linguistic criticism include Akkadian, Ugaritic, and Latin. Moreover, Arabic, Hittite, Eblamite, Canaanite, and Phoenician may be helpful depending on the interests of the critic.

Linguistic criticism is not the same as textual criticism, though it does fall under that discipline. Where textual criticism may examine phenomena that occur within a single language, like elision, and even the likelihood of scribal error in recording what is dictated to him; linguistic criticism specifically inspects how languages affect one another in the process of translating from one to another, and how a language changes over time, psycholinguistically and aurally.

A scholar employing linguistic criticism would look at a passage such as Matthew 27: 46/Mark 15:34, which the Greek text renders as "My God, My God! Why have you deserted Me?" (CJB), and instead of blindly accepting the Greek rendering of the Aramaic words Jesus spoke on the execution stake, would look to the Aramaic language for the meaning of that passage and discover that the Greek mistranslated it and that the correct interpretation is, in fact, "My God, My God! For this moment I have been spared!" or "My God, My God! This is my destination!" It would be immediately obvious from a study of the Aramaic passage that the word in the text "shabaktani" does not mean forsaken or deserted (that word would be nashatani); it means spared or destined.
