= Dani Levy =

Swiss filmmaker

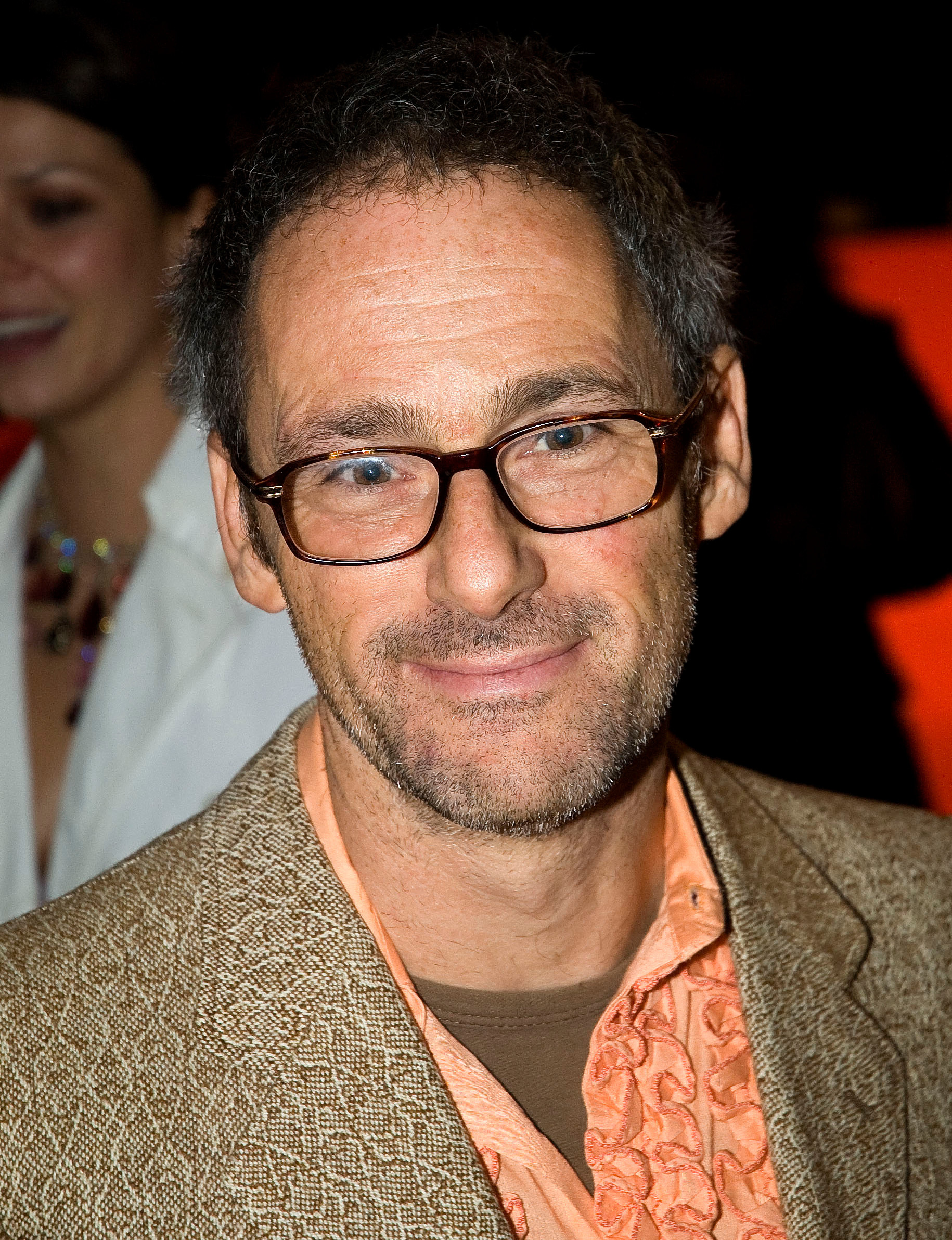
- Levy at the 2008 Berlin International Film Festival
- Born: 17 November 1957 (age 68); Basel, Switzerland
- Occupations: Filmmaker; Theatrical director; Screenwriter; Actor
- Years active: 1986–present

Dani Levy (born 17 November 1957) is a Swiss filmmaker, theatrical director, screenwriter and actor.

== Biography ==
Levy was born to a Jewish family in Switzerland in 1957. His mother was a Holocaust survivor. He moved to Berlin in the 1980s.

Levy's films include RobbyKallePaul, I Was on Mars, Meschugge, Du mich auch and Väter. Väter starred Christiane Paul. In 2004, he directed Alles auf Zucker!, a comedy about a secularised Jew from the former GDR who has to reconcile himself with his Orthodox brother. In 2007, he directed the comedy drama Mein Führer – Die wirklich wahrste Wahrheit über Adolf Hitler, about a Jewish actor hired to enliven Adolf Hitler's speeches during the final days of World War II, starring Germans comedian Helge Schneider. It was entered into the 29th Moscow International Film Festival.

Levy said he was influenced by the theory of Swiss-based psychologist Alice Miller, published in 1980, that something must have gone wrong with Hitler in his childhood. His 1995 film Stille Nacht won an Honourable Mention at the 46th Berlin International Film Festival.

He is one of the founders of the German company X Filme Creative Pool.

== Filmography ==
Director

- 1986: Du mich auch
- 1989: RobbyKallePaul
- 1991: I Was on Mars
- 1993: Ohne mich (Short)
- 1995: Stille Nacht
- 1998: Meschugge
- 1999: Das Geheimnis (Short)
- 2002: I'm the Father
- 2004: Alles auf Zucker!
- 2007: Mein Führer – Die wirklich wahrste Wahrheit über Adolf Hitler
- 2010: Life Is Too Long
- 2016: Wunderlich's World
- 2019: Berlin, I Love You
- 2020. The Kangaroo Chronicles

Actor

- 1986: Du mich auch .... Romeo
- 1989: RobbyKallePaul .... Robby
- 1991: Hausmänner .... Paul
- 1991: I Was on Mars .... Alio
- 1993: Ohne mich (Short) .... Simon Rosenthal
- 1994: Burning Life .... Neuss
- 1995: One of My Oldest Friends .... Zeto
- 1995: The Meds .... Jost
- 1995: Halbe Welt .... Katz
- 1996: Killer Condom .... Prostitute's Client
- 1996: Tempo (1996) .... Bernd
- 1998: Meschugge .... David Fish
- 1999: Aimée & Jaguar .... Fritz Borchert
- 1999: Die Hochzeitskuh .... Fleabag Hotel Concierge
- 2001: Replay .... Matthias
- 2004: Alles auf Zucker! .... Pool-Spieler (uncredited)
- 2009: Germany 09 .... Himself (segment "Joshua")
- 2010: Life Is Too Long
- 2015: The People vs. Fritz Bauer .... Chaim Cohn
- 2015: Time to Say Goodbye .... Moderator
- 2018: Sohn meines Vaters .... Karl Kaufmann
- 2019: Winter Journey .... Landlord
