= Stefan Arndt =

German film producer

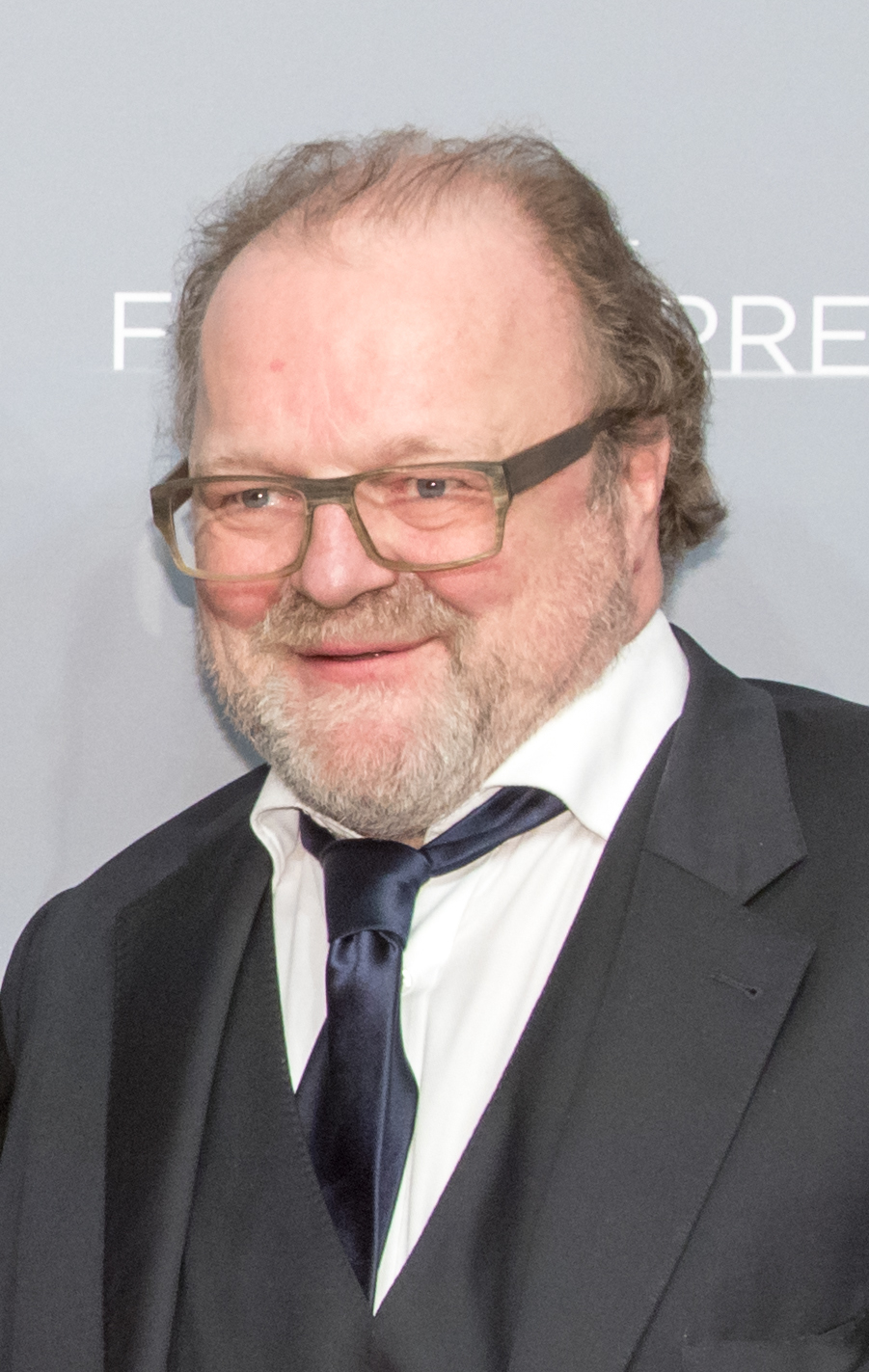
- Born: 28 August 1961 (age 64); Munich, West Germany
- Occupation: Film producer

Stefan Arndt (born 1961) is a German film producer and managing partner of X Filme Creative Pool, which he started with fellow friends Tom Tykwer, Wolfgang Becker and Dani Levy. X Filme is one of Germany's most prosperous and famous production companies. Arndt produces many X Filme productions and acts as head manager of the company. He produced the films Cloud Atlas, Alone in Berlin and Frantz.

== Awards ==
- 1998 Bavarian Film Awards, Best Production
- 2013 Bavarian Film Awards, Best Production for Cloud Atlas
