= Girls Le Disko =

Compilation album by Shiny Toy Guns
- Released: December 15, 2009
- Recorded: 2009
- Genres: Indie rock, synthpop, new wave, post-punk revival, post-hardcore, progressive rock, alternative dance
- Length: 1:14:34
- Label: Ultra Records

Shiny Toy Guns chronology
| Season of Poison (2008) | Girls Le Disko (2009) | III (2012) |

Singles from Girls Le Disko
- 1. "Major Tom (Coming Home)"

Girls Le Disko is a remix compilation by American band Shiny Toy Guns. It was released on December 15, 2009 on Ultra Records.

The cover of "Major Tom (Coming Home)" originally appeared in a 2009 commercial for the 2010 Lincoln MKZ and is the first single from this compilation. In January 2010, Shiny Toy Gun teamed up with Lincoln to produce a music video for Major Tom. It features a live recording of Major Tom and was aired during the 52nd Grammy commercials supporting Lincoln. This live version can be downloaded for free on Lincoln's website.

"Rocketship 2010" was released in January 2010. It was released as a free MySpace download offered through Coca-Cola's Formula for Happiness. While commonly accredited to the album Girls Le Disko, this version of the song is actually not included on this album. "Rocketship 2010" is the third update of "Rocketship" and features a new chorus. The first version appeared on the first demo of We Are Pilots in 2005, and the second version was included on the UK limited edition of We Are Pilots as well as the Girls Le Disko release. In March a music video was released for "Rocketship 2010" through Ultra Records. It was released as a single on April 20, 2010.

== Track listing ==
1. "Le Disko (Boys Noize Vocal Mix)" – 5:56
2. "Major Tom (Coming Home)" – 4:12
3. "Rainy Monday (Hervé Remix)" – 5:33
4. "You Are The One (Gabriel & Dresden Unplugged Mix)" – 9:19
5. "Ricochet! (Kissy Sell Out Mix)" – 4:48
6. "Ghost Town (Evol Intent Remix)" – 5:00
7. "Don't Cry Out (The Teenagers Remix)" – 3:04
8. "Le Disko (Ferry Corsten Mix)" – 4:41
9. "Rainy Monday (Bimbo Jones Radio Edit)" – 3:30
10. "You Are The One (Adam Freeland Remix)" – 3:57
11. "Ricochet! (Nadastrom Digital Foot Stomp Remix)" – 6:53
12. "Ghost Town (Hi-Deaf Remix)" – 4:30
13. "Starts with One (Classixx Mix)" – 5:11
14. "Ricochet! (BT Remix)" – 4:30
15. "Rocketship" – 3:30

=== Bonus tracks ===
1. "Major Tom (Coming Home) [Adam K & Soha Radio Edit] – 3:59 (iTunes Bonus Track)
2. "Rocketship [Starkillers Dub] – 6:24 (Beatport Bonus Track)

== Singles ==
| Year | Single | Peak chart positions | | | | | | |
| Year | Single | US | US Alt. | US Dance | UK | CAN | US Heat | Digital Songs |
|---|---|---|---|---|---|---|---|---|
| 2009/10 | "Major Tom (Coming Home)" | 97 | — | — | — | 46 | 7 | 69 |

== Remixes by ==
- Boys Noize
- Hervé
- Gabriel & Dresden
- Kissy Sell Out
- Evol Intent
- The Teenagers
- Ferry Corsten
- Bimbo Jones
- Adam Freeland
- Nadastrom
- Hi-Deaf
- Classixx
- BT
- Adam K & Soha
- Starkillers Dub
