= The Different Story (World of Lust and Crime) =

Compilation album by Peter Schilling
- Released: 1989
- Recorded: 1982–1984
- Genres: New wave; synthpop
- Length: 38:21
- Label: Elektra
- Producers: Michael Cretu; Armin Sabol; Peter Schilling

Peter Schilling chronology
Things to Come (1985)	The Different Story (World of Lust and Crime) (1989)

Professional ratings
Review scores
Source	Rating
AllMusic	1.5/5 stars

The Different Story (World of Lust and Crime) is the first compilation album by German singer-songwriter Peter Schilling, released through Elektra Records in 1989.

In producing the compilation, Schilling explained that he'd grown tired and needed a break by the time of the album's production and release, providing a possible reason why there was only one new track recorded. The title track was a collaborative effort between Schilling and Enigma's Michael Cretu, and is the only song written and released in English only. It was a top-10 pop hit in Sweden. Released in a dance mix, the song was also a club hit, reaching No. 16 on the Billboard Dance chart. The song was Schilling's last Billboard Hot 100 pop hit to date, peaking at No. 61.

== Reception ==
The number of copies the album sold was low. William Cooper of Allmusic says that besides the hit song "Major Tom" and the title track "The Different Story (World of Lust and Crime)," the "rest of the material here just isn't worth the trouble."

== Track listing ==
Side one
No.	Title	Lyrics	Music	Original release	Length
1.	"The Different Story (World of Lust and Crime)"	Hubert Kemmler; Susanne Müller-Pi; Peter Schilling	Kemmler; Schilling	New recording	3:54
2.	"Major Tom (Coming Home)"	Schilling; David Lodge	Schilling	Error in the System, 1983	5:01
3.	"The Noah Plan"	Schilling; Lodge	Schilling	Error in the System	4:22
4.	"City of Night (Berlin)"	Schilling; Matthew Garey	Armin Sabol	Things to Come, 1985	5:07

Side two
No.	Title	Lyrics	Music	Original release	Length
1.	"Lone Survivor"	Ulf Krüger; David Lodge	Sabol	Things to Come	4:05
2.	"Terra Titanic (Lost to the Sea)"	Krüger; Garey	Schilling	Things to Come	3:59
3.	"Zone 804"	Schiller; Garey	Schilling	Things to Come	4:11
4.	"The Hurricane (Hammers on the Shore)"	Krüger; Garey	Schilling	Things to Come	4:25
5.	"(Let's Play) U.S.A."	Schilling; Garey	Sabol	Error in the System	3:17
Total length:					38:21
