= Ghost Town (Shiny Toy Guns song) =

Single by Shiny Toy Guns

from the album Season of Poison
- Released: January 30, 2009
- Recorded: 2008
- Genre: Alternative rock, post-hardcore, electroclash
- Length: 3:43
- Label: Universal Motown (U.S.)
- Songwriters: Chad Petree, Jeremy Dawson, Sisely Treasure

Shiny Toy Guns singles chronology
""Ricochet!"" (2008)	"Ghost Town" (2009)	"Major Tom (Coming Home)" (2009)

"Ghost Town" is the fifth single by rock Shiny Toy Guns, and the second single from their second album Season of Poison. The single peaked at #26 on the Billboard Alternative Songs Chart.

== Track listing ==
No.	Title	Length
1.	"Ghost Town" (Main)	3:43
2.	"Ghost Town" (Instrumental)	3:43

== Music video ==
Shot as an animated video, it starts with a capture of an abandoned placard, which read "Welcome to Ghost Town, Population Dead." The video then continues showing the band, all portrayed as cartoon characters, singing the song. While they invade the town with their out-loud performance, zombies are seen coming out of the ground. Nearing the end, all the ghosts, including all the band's members, disappear when struck with the sunlight. The music video was directed by Glen Hanson.

== Personnel ==
- Sisely Treasure – vocals
- Chad Petree – guitar, vocals (chorus)
- Jeremy Dawson – keyboards, bass
- Mikey Martin – drums, percussion
