= Glen Hanson =

Canadian cartoonist

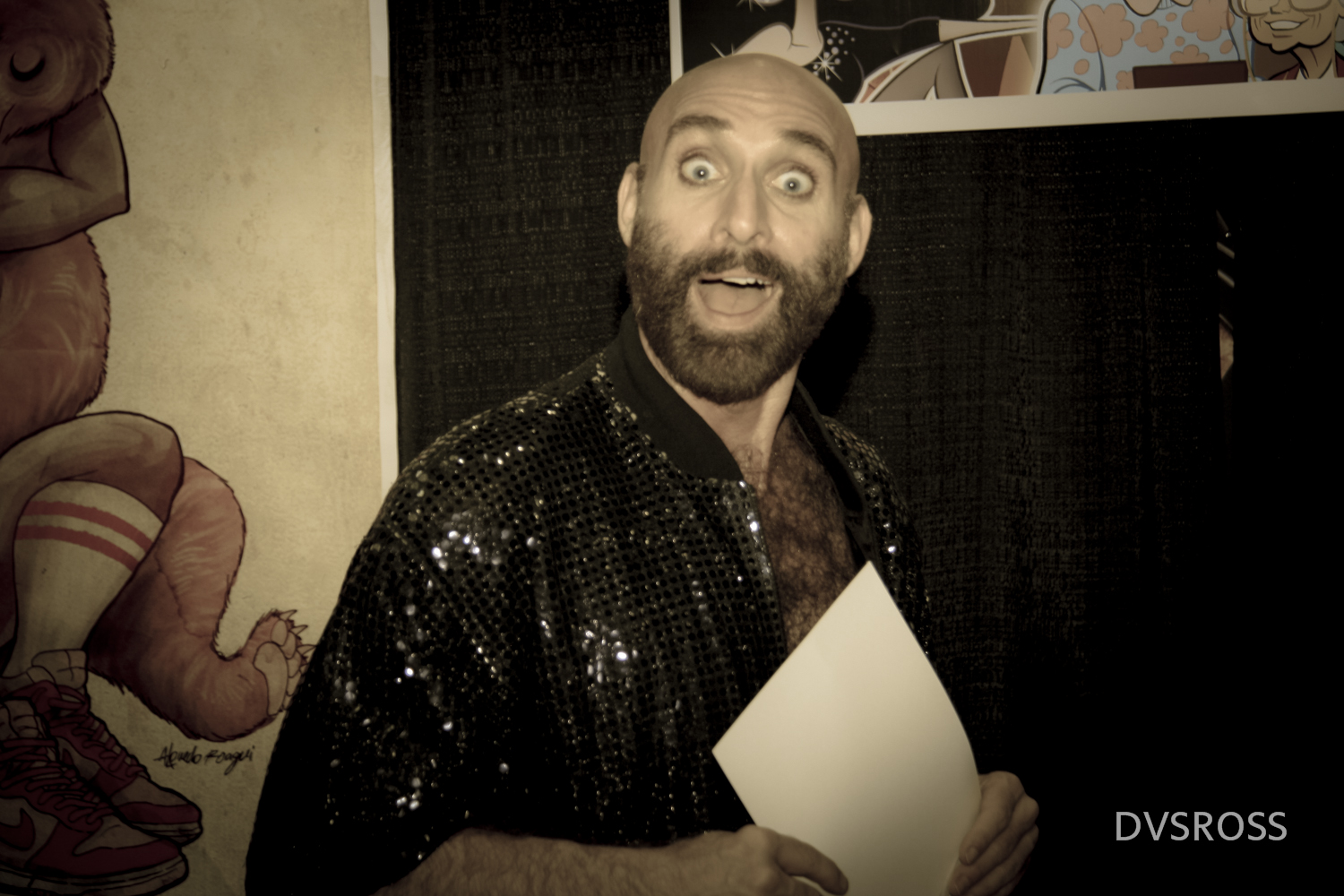
- Born: Toronto, Ontario, Canada
- Area: New York City
- Notable works: Chelsea Boys

Glen Hanson is an openly gay Canadian-born caricaturist and cartoonist, who works primarily in illustration and animation. He is best known as co-creator of the comic strip Chelsea Boys with Allan Charles Neuwirth.

His illustrations have appeared in a variety of publications around the world including British Vogue, GQ, Entertainment Weekly, The Wall Street Journal, Maxim, and Variety.

His animation work can be seen on the television series Babar, Beetlejuice, Daria, Freaky Stories and Spy Groove (for which he received an Annie Award in 2000).

Hanson studied animation at the Sheridan College Institute of Technology and Advanced Learning.

Hanson was awarded a certificate of excellence from the American Institute of Graphic Arts for his work on Blink 182's The Mark, Tom and Travis Show album cover.

In 2009, he designed and directed the animated music video "Ghost Town" for Universal Music recording artists Shiny Toy Guns.
