= Ricochet! =

Single by Shiny Toy Guns

from the album Season of Poison
- Released: September 2, 2008
- Length: 2:39
- Label: Universal Motown (U.S.)
- Songwriter(s): Chad Petree, Jeremy Dawson, Sisely Treasure

Shiny Toy Guns singles chronology
"Rainy Monday" (2008)	"Ricochet!" (2008)	"Ghost Town" (2008)

"Ricochet!" is the first single from Shiny Toy Guns' second album Season of Poison. The single peaked #17 on the Alternative Songs Chart. It is their highest charting single to date on the Alternative Songs Chart.

== Music video ==
Produced by Teleprompt Films, the music video was directed by Israel Anthem.

== Usage in other media ==
- It is featured on an episode of Gossip Girl in Season 2 Episode 14 "In the Realm of the Basses"
- It is used in a promo for the NFL
- It was featured on an episode of Knight Rider
- It was used in New World Disorder 9.
- It is also featured on Tony Hawk Ride.
- It was featured in the movie Wall Street: Money Never Sleeps
