= Versant (disambiguation) =

Versant is an American media company that is a spin off from Comcast's NBCUniversal.

Versant may also refer to:

- Versant (band), a musical group
- Versant District, a municipal district in Gatineau, Quebec, Canada
- Versant (language test), computerized tests of spoken language
- Versant Corporation, software company
- Versant Power, a subsidiary of Enmax
