= Pachanga (duo) =

Puerto Rican Latin and reggaeton duo

- Origin: Puerto Rico
- Genres: Reggaetón, Latin, pop-rap, hip hop
- Years active: 2004-2011, 2015-present
- Label: Milagro Music Entertainment
- Members: Jay Del Alma (2004–2011, 2015-present); Sesman (2015–present)
- Past members: Rico Caliente (2004-2011)

Jay Del Alma
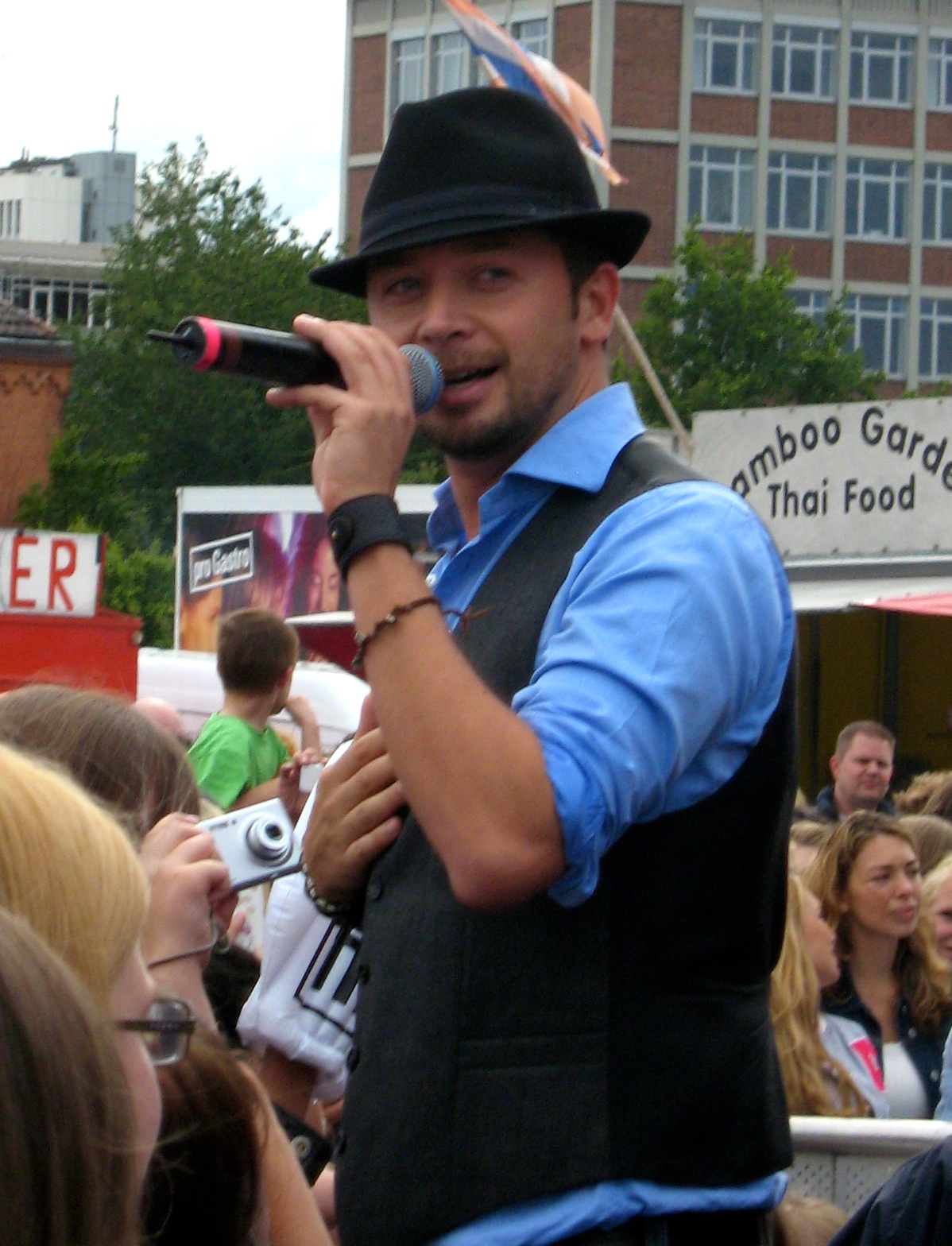
- Jay Del Alma

Background information
- Born: October 27, 1980 (age 45)
- Origin: Brazil
- Genres: Pop, Dance, Latin
- Years active: 2004–present
- Labels: Milagro, Monopol Records

Pachanga is a reggaeton and Latin group from San Juan, Puerto Rico. The name of the duo comes from the pachanga genre of music.

== Beginnings (2004-2011) ==
The group was founded in 2004 by the Brazilian Jay del Alma and the Spanish Rico Caliente. The duo became famous with their 2005 hit "Loco", that peaked at No. 17 on the German Single Charts also charting in Austria and Switzerland. "Loco" was also number 1 on the MTV Ringtone Charts in 2005. It was also popular in a number of Eastern European countries. There follow up "Close to You" in 2006 reached No. 16 in Germany. Other hits by Pachanga in this period include "Calienta", "Si sierra", "Te aseguro que si", "Hip Hop Hooray" and "I Don't Like Reggae-Ton". Rico Caliente left the band in 2011 and a four-year break followed.

== Jay Del Alma: Solo (2011-2015) ==
Jay Del Alma born into a family of diplomats in Brazil was well traveled a lot and had lived in Peru, Paraguay and Puerto Rico. After break-up of the duo, Jay Del Alma began his solo career. He settled in Germany. His first solo hit in Germany was in 2009 with "Mi Corazon", a Latinized cover of the Heinz Rudolf Kunze hit "Dein ist mein ganzes Herz". The song reached No. 29 on the German Media Control Charts. It also made it to No. 46 on the German Airplay Charts. After his solo chart success, he concentrated on a solo 15-track album entitled De mi corazón with single track as "¿Cómo estás?". Rico Caliente the departing member contributed in one track "Tira (Dinero)" featuring him and another collaboration with Münchener Freiheit featured on the track "Besame". He appeared on ZDF Fernsehgarten performing live and also formed his live Jay Del Alma Band. In 2016, he released the Spanish language "Vuela (Major Tom)" featuring original vocalist Peter Schilling. It is a remake of "Major Tom (Coming Home)" by the latter based on David Bowie.

== Comeback (2015-present) ==
After the hiatus, Pacahnga had a comeback with Jay del Alma associating with a Chilean MC Sesman replaced Rico Caliente. The musical styles were markedly Latin with Urban, Hip Hop and Pop influences. Soon the album La Era Positiva was released in 2015. The main single from the album was "Vida positiva" that appeared in German DJ Black / Pop Charts Top 10. The album also includes international collaborations from the Canadian singer Massari in the song "La Noche Entera" featuring him and in Brick & Lace's singer Nyanda in the song "Dangerous".

== Members ==
Original members

- Jay Del Alma (born in Brazil on October 27, 1980)
- Rico Caliente (born in Spain in 1976) - Left

Present members

- Jay del Alma
- MC Sesman (born in Chile in 1984)

== Discography: Pachanga ==
=== Albums ===
- 2006: Recontra locos latinos
- 2008: La revolucion de pura raza
- 2011: Mas Pachanga Tres
- 2015: La era positiva
- 2015: La era positiva (The Remixes)

=== Singles ===
Year	Single	Peak positions			Album
Year	Single	GER	AUT	SWI	Album
2005	"Loco"	17	51	80	
2006	"Close to You"	16	32	–	
2007	"I Don't Like Reggae-Ton"	34	–	–	
2008	"Calienta"	100	–	–	
2011	"M.P.3 (Part One)" / "M.P.3 (Part Two)"	–	–	–	Mas Pachanga Tres
2011	"Un Dos Tres (1-2-3)"	–	–	–	
2015	"Vida positiva"	–	–	–	La Era Positiva
2015	"La noche entera" (feat. Massari)	–	–	–	La Era Positiva
2016	"Latino en New York"	–	–	–	
2017	"Enamorado de ti (Shape of You)"	–	–	–	
2018	"Mastícalo"	–	–	–	

=== Featured in ===
Year	Single	Peak positions	Album
Year	Single	GER	Album
2016	"Dale Pa'lante" (DJ Polique feat. Pachanga)	–	
2018	"Sudamericana" (Andra feat. Pachanga)	–	

== Discography: Jay Del Alma ==
=== Albums ===
- 2010: De mi corazon - Best of Deutsche Hits im Latin Style
- 2013: ¿Cómo estás? - Best of Deutsche Hits im Latin Style – Vol.2

=== EPs ===
- 2013: ¿Sexy Como Estas (36 Grad)? EP
- 2013: Si la Vida (Als ich fortging) EP (feat. Karussell)
- 2014: Marlene EP (feat. Frank Zander)
- 2016: Vuela (Major Tom) EP (feat. Peter Schilling)

=== Singles ===
Year	Single	Peak positions	Album
Year	Single	GER	Album
2005	"Mi corazón"	29	De mi corazón

- 2009: "Mi corazón"
- 2010: "Bésame" (feat. Münchener Freiheit)
- 2011: "No No Llores"
- 2012: "Hasta que salga el sol"
- 2013: "Dame tu mano"
- 2013: "Marlene"
- 2013: "¿Sexy cómo estás? (36 Grad)"
- 2013: "¿Cómo estás?"
- 2014: "Hola, bla bla"
- 2016: "Vuela (Major Tom)" (feat. Peter Schilling)
