= Sisely Treasure =

American singer and dancer (born 1982)

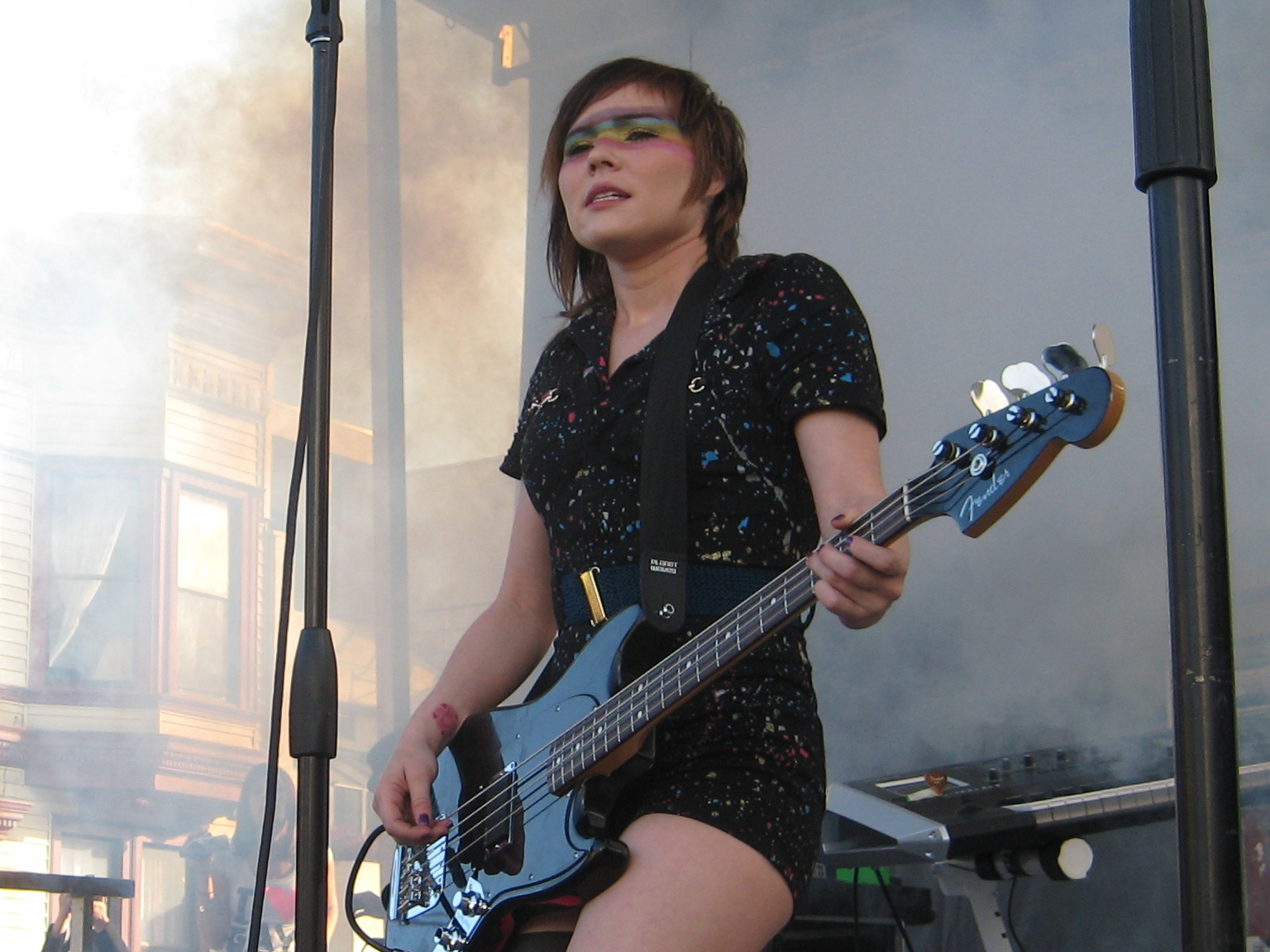
- Sisely Treasure performing at the Folsom Street Fair in 2008

Background information
- Born: Sisely Dove Treasure; November 28, 1982 (age 43); Long Beach, California, U.S.
- Origin: Los Angeles, California, U.S.
- Genres: Pop, rock, dance, electronic
- Occupations: Singer, dancer
- Instruments: Bass, keyboards, vocals
- Years active: 2002–present
- Labels: Audacious, Dreamworks, Teenacide
- Website: www.siselytreasure.com

Sisely Dove Treasure (born November 28, 1982) is an American singer and dancer, notable for the song "All Around the World" released by DreamWorks Records in July 2003 and appearing in Billboard magazine's top 40 dance charts the same year. "Morning Star", another song off the Punk Debutante album, made the top ten on the Billboard dance chart. In 2008, she became one of three vocalists for the rock group Shiny Toy Guns. In 2011, she released her solo single, "That You Like". On November 28, a preview video of a new single titled "Million Hands" was released on her official YouTube page. She was born in Long Beach, California and currently lives in Los Angeles.

== Career ==
=== Cooler Kids ===
Before Treasure's appearance on the Pussycat Dolls reality TV show, she formed the music group Cooler Kids with producer and performer Kaz Gamble. Treasure had the opportunity to work with several record labels, including DreamWorks Recordings, Audacious Records and Teenacide Records, and released a debut album, entitled Punk Debutante, in which the chart-entering single "All Around the World" was published. She has co-written and sung on songs "The Grass is Greener" and "Common Ground" by Dave Audé and Tall Paul. Sisely Treasure was also a member of all the all-girl pop-punk, j-pop-ish group The Holograms, at which time they had a chart buster on Billboard top garage Hits "Are you ready for it".

=== Dancing career ===
She was among the first original crew of kids that made up the dance troupe Sparkids performing at the Forum during the LA Sparks games and Laker games. In her early teens she was part of one of the premier young dance companies in the world, under the wing of renowned choreographer Marguerite Derricks. She has also danced in various commercials and for several other major choreographers and dancers such as Terry Beeman, Wade Robson, Wes Veldink and Galen Hooks.

=== The Search for the Next Doll ===
Treasure appeared in the first season of the CW reality show Pussycat Dolls Present: The Search for the Next Doll. Sisely was often praised by Robin Antin for her uniqueness and individuality. On the show, she was a couple years older than the others and said she at times felt like an outsider. She was the third girl eliminated after being told her vocals were off and she didn't live up to her rock persona. She shook up the show's fanbase and fellow contestant and eventual winner Asia Nitollano when she responded to the contestants' discussion of each other's dancing abilities by stating that she thought that Asia danced "like a drag queen", shortly before she was eliminated, causing the other contestants (with the exception of Nitollano) to burst out laughing. She then very briefly joined the Paradiso Girls.

=== Sisely and the Safety Pin-ups ===
After Search for the Next Doll she joined another group named Sisely and the Safety Pin-ups and released a cover of "Do the Robot" which was voted coolest garage song by Garage Rock. She was also featured in a Yahoo article which named her the "Punkycat Doll". She was also one of the members of the Gunn Metal Grey dance group.

=== Shiny Toy Guns (2008–2010) ===
On August 12, 2008, it was announced that Sisely Treasure was the new female vocalist for the band Shiny Toy Guns, replacing Carah Faye Charnow. Her vocals are featured on the band's second album Season of Poison, released on November 4, 2008, and the band's covers of "Burnin' for You" and "Major Tom (Coming Home)" that were featured in commercials for Lincoln cars. Prior to the release of Shiny Toy Guns' third album III, former band member Carah Faye Charnow returned to resume the role of lead female singer for the band, and Treasure was not featured on the album.

=== Solo career development (2010–present) ===
Early February 2011, Sisely Treasure released a single as a solo artist on her website. The single, "That You Like", is available to listen for free on her website (https://soundcloud.com/siselytreasure).

In March 2013, Sisely was featured on the track "Into Vapor" by culineR.

In July 2013, Sisely was the featured on Audacious Records' release "Shadow of the Sun" by Ikon & Exodus.

In December 2016, Sisely was featured as her new project "SISTERWIFE" on the Release "Kick In The Bass" by Darku J & Styles & Complete.
