= Things to Come (Peter Schilling album) =

Things To Come

Studio album by Peter Schilling
- Released: 1985
- Recorded: 1984−1985
- Studios: Peer Studios, Blank Tape Studios
- Genres: New wave; synthpop
- Length: 39:07 (English version); 41:27 (German version)
- Languages: English; German
- Labels: Elektra (US); WEA Records (GER)
- Producers: Armin Sabol; Peter Schilling

Peter Schilling chronology
Error in the System (1983)	Things To Come (1985)	The Different Story (World of Lust and Crime) (1989)

Things to Come is the second English-language studio album by German singer-songwriter Peter Schilling and is the counterpart to the German-language album 120 Grad.

== Track listings ==
=== Things to Come ===
All lyrics are written by Peter Schilling and Matthew Garey, except where noted; all music is composed by Armin Sabol, except where noted.

Side one
No.	Title	Lyrics	Music	Length
1.	"Chill of the Night"			4:04
2.	"City of Night (Berlin)"			5:03
3.	"Lone Survivor"	Ulf Krüger; David Lodge		5:03
4.	"The Hurricane (Hammers on the Shore)"		Schilling	4:36
5.	"Where You Are I Am"	Schilling; Lodge	Schilling	4:40

Side two
No.	Title	Lyrics	Music	Length
1.	"Things to Come"			4:10
2.	"Terra Titanic (Lost to the Sea)"	Krüger; Garey	Schilling	3:58
3.	"Zone 804"		Schilling	4:10
4.	"10,000 Points"			3:16
Total length:				39:07

=== 120 Grad ===
All lyrics are written by Peter Schilling, except where noted; all music is composed by Armin Sabol, except where noted.

Side one
No.	Title	Music	Length
1.	"Hitze der nacht"		5:16
2.	"Hurricane"	Schilling	4:30
3.	"Region 804"	Schilling	4:18
4.	"Fünfte Dimension"		5:11
5.	"10,000 punkte"		3:16

Side two
No.	Title	Lyrics	Music	Length
1.	"Einsam überleben"	Krüger		4:03
2.	"Party im vulkan"		Schilling	4:46
3.	"Terra Titanic"	Krüger	Schilling	5:03
4.	"120 Grad"			4:40
Total length:				41:03
