= You Are the One (Shiny Toy Guns song) =

Single by Shiny Toy Guns

from the album We Are Pilots
- Released: April 23, 2007
- Recorded: 2005
- Genre: New wave
- Length: 4:33
- Label: Universal
- Songwriter(s): Chad Petree, Jeremy Dawson, Stephen Petree

Shiny Toy Guns singles chronology
"Le Disko" (2006)	"You Are the One" (2007)	"Rainy Monday" (2007)

"You Are the One" is the second single by rock group Shiny Toy Guns from their album We Are Pilots. This single peaked at #25 on the Alternative Songs chart, at #94 on the UK Singles Chart, and at #23 on the Dance Airplay chart.

The song has its roots in a composition called "Neo (The One)", which was released in 2001 by Shiny Toy Guns members Jeremy Dawson and Chad Petree, under the alias Slyder, and appeared on the soundtrack to Grand Theft Auto III.

== Music video ==
The music video begins with a girl trapped in a large bubble of water. The band is then shown to be playing in front of her. Throughout the video, she looks around inside her bubble, until the song's bridge, at which point the bubble explodes. Heavy rain then starts falling on the band, and intense winds begin to blow. The girl, now free from the bubble, is taken away by what appears to be an angel. The video closes with the band walking toward the camera.

== Track listing ==
UK CD single

1. You Are the One (Album Version)
2. Weather Girl (Non Album Track)
3. I Promise You Walls (Non Album Track)

Vinyl remix single

1. You Are the One (Gabriel & Dresden Club remix)
2. You Are the One (Gabriel & Dresden Unplugged remix)
3. You Are the One (Adam Freeland Vocal remix)
4. You Are the One (Adam Freeland remix, instrumental)
5. You Are the One (Sharam Jey remix)
6. You Are the One (T. S. Electronic Exaltation mix)
7. You Are the One (T. S. Electronic Radio mix)

== Usage in other media ==
- It was featured in the soundtrack of the video game FIFA 07.
- It was featured in a promo for ABC's show Private Practice.
- It was featured on the British programme Waterloo Road.
- It was featured on the British version of Hells Kitchen with Marco Pierre White.
- The song's precursor, "Neo (The One)", was featured in the video game Grand Theft Auto III.

== Charts ==
Chart (2007)	Peak position
UK Singles (OCC)	94
US Alternative Airplay (Billboard)	25
