= Plastic Bertrand discography =

- Studio albums: 10
- Compilation albums: 9
- Singles: 44

This is the discography of the Belgian punk/new wave musician Plastic Bertrand.

== Albums ==
=== Studio albums ===
Year	Title	Details	Peak chart positions					
Year	Title	Details	BEL (WA)	FRA	NLD	NZ	QUE	SWE
1978	AN 1	Released: 1978; Label: RKM, Vogue, Sire; Formats: LP, MC, 8-track	—	2	38	37	7	31
1979	J'te fais un plan	Released: 1979; Label: RKM, Vogue; Formats: LP, MC	—	—	—	—	—	38
1980	L'album	Released: 1980; Label: RKM, Vogue; Formats: LP, MC	—	—	—	—	3	40
1981	Plastiquez vos baffles	Released: 1981; Label: RKM; Formats: LP, MC	—	—	—	—	—	—
1983	Chat va...Et toi?	Released: 1983; Label: RKM; Formats: LP, MC	—	—	—	—	—	—
1989	Pix	Released: 1989; Label: ARS Productions; Formats: CD, LP	—	—	—	—	—	—
1994	Suite diagonale	Released: 1991; Label: Réaction – MMD; Formats: CD	—	—	—	—	—	—
2002	Ultra terrestre	Released: November 2002; Label: RM; Formats: CD	—	—	—	—	—	—
2008	Dandy Bandit	Released: 17 November 2008; Label: Self-released; Formats: CD, digital download	—	—	—	—	—	—
2020	L'expérience humaine	Released: 23 October 2020; Label: Sing or Swing; Formats: CD, digital download	102	—	—	—	—	—
"—" denotes releases that did not chart or were not released in that territory.

=== Compilation albums ===
Year	Title	Details
1980	Plastic Bertrand	Released: 1980; Label: RKM, Vogue; Formats: LP, MC
1981	Grands succès/Greatest Hits	Released: 1981; Label: Attic, Hansa; Formats: LP, MC, 8-track
1984	Ses grands succès	Released: 1984; Label: Music for Pleasure; Formats: LP, MC; France-only release
1989	Plastic Compilation	Released: 1989; Label: RCA; Formats: CD, LP
1996	The Very Best of Plastic Bertrand	Released: 1996; Label: CMC Entertainment; Formats: CD; UK-only release
1998	Plastic Bertrand	Released: 1998; Label: amc, Universal; Formats: CD
2002	L'essentiel	Released: 2002; Label: EMI; Formats: CD; France-only release
2003	King of the Divan	Released: 22 April 2003; Label: amc; Formats: CD
2009	Greatest Hits	Released: 31 July 2009; Label: Choice of Music; Formats: CD

== Singles ==
Year	Title	Peak chart positions										Certifications
Year	Title	BEL (FL)	AUS	FRA	GER	ITA	QUE	SWE	SWI	UK	US	Certifications
1977	"Ça plane pour moi"	11	2	1	6	—	4	12	1	8	47	BPI: Silver
1978	"Bambino"	—	—	4	—	—	—	—	—	—	—	
1978	"Super Cool"	—	—	35	—	—	—	—	—	—	—	
1978	"Sha La La La Lee"	—	—	—	—	—	—	—	—	39	—	
1978	"Tout petit la planète"	—	—	7	—	—	20	15	—	—	—	
1978	"C'est le rock 'n' roll" (UK, Germany and Ireland-only release)	—	—	—	—	—	—	—	—	—	—	
1979	"Sentimentale moi"	—	—	8	—	—	39	11 (Note: Chart peak is for the English-language version, "Sentimental Me", which was only released in Scandinavia and the Netherlands and was backed by the French-language version.)	—	—	—	
1979	"Le monde est merveilleux"	—	—	60	—	—	—	—	—	—	—	
1980	"Téléphone à téléphone mon bijou"	—	—	53	—	—	4	—	—	—	—	
1980	"Stop ou encore"	—	—	—	—	—	7	—	—	—	—	
1980	"Sans amour"	—	—	16	—	18	8	—	—	—	—	
1981	"Hula Hoop"	35	—	6	—	3	8	—	—	—	—	
1981	"Jacques Cousteau"	—	—	—	—	—	—	—	—	—	—	
1981	"La star de l'école (Baby Doll)"	—	—	—	—	—	—	—	—	—	—	
1981	"Cour d'acier" (Canada-only release)	—	—	—	—	—	—	—	—	—	—	
1982	"Ping Pong"	—	—	—	—	6	46	—	—	—	—	
1982	"L'amour OK" (with Nathalie)	—	—	—	—	15	—	—	—	—	—	
1982	"Damned" (from the film Légitime violence)	—	—	—	—	—	18	—	—	—	—	
1982	"Juke Box" (from the TV series Due di tutto; Italy-only release)	—	—	—	—	—	—	—	—	—	—	
1983	"Mon nez mon nez"	—	—	—	—	—	—	—	—	—	—	
1983	"Chat"	—	—	—	—	—	—	—	—	—	—	
1983	"Miss Italie"	—	—	—	—	33	—	—	—	—	—	
1984	"Major Tom"	—	—	—	—	—	—	—	—	—	—	
1984	"Gueule d'amour"	—	—	—	—	—	—	—	—	—	—	
1984	"Dead or Alive" (Italy-only release)	—	—	—	—	—	—	—	—	—	—	
1985	"Astérix est là" (from the film Asterix Versus Caesar)	—	—	—	—	—	—	—	—	—	—	
1986	"Je l'jure"	—	—	—	—	—	—	—	—	—	—	
1986	"Let's Slow Again"	—	—	—	—	—	—	—	—	—	—	
1987	"Amour-amour"	—	—	—	—	—	—	—	—	—	—	
1988	"Démente à la menthe"	—	—	—	—	—	—	—	—	—	—	
1989	"Slave to the Beat"	23	—	—	—	—	—	—	—	—	—	
1989	"Sex Tabou"	—	—	—	—	—	—	—	—	—	—	
1990	"House Machine" (Club Control featuring Plastic Bertrand)	—	—	—	—	—	—	—	—	—	—	
1994	"Les joueurs de tchick-tchick"	—	—	—	—	—	—	—	—	—	—	
1997	"Stop... ou encore" (with Get Ready!)	40	—	—	—	—	—	—	—	—	—	
2002	"Play-boy"	—	—	—	—	—	—	—	—	—	—	
2002	"Plasticubration"	—	—	—	—	—	—	—	—	—	—	
2008	"Ça plane pour moi" (The BossHoss featuring Plastic Bertrand; Germany promo-only release)	—	—	—	—	—	—	—	—	—	—	
2019	"No Plastic" (B-Generation featuring Plastic Bertrand)	—	—	—	—	—	—	—	—	—	—	
2020	"Tout petit la planète" (live acoustic version)	—	—	—	—	—	—	—	—	—	—	
2020	"L'expérience humaine"	—	—	—	—	—	—	—	—	—	—	
2020	"I'll Be Back Again"	—	—	—	—	—	—	—	—	—	—	
2021	"Andy Warhol"	—	—	—	—	—	—	—	—	—	—	
2021	"L'autre terre"	—	—	—	—	—	—	—	—	—	—	
"—" denotes releases that did not chart or were not released in that territory.
