= Season of Poison =

Second album by Shiny Toy Guns

Studio album by Shiny Toy Guns
- Released: November 4, 2008 (U.S.)
- Recorded: 2008
- Genre: Electronic rock
- Length: 45:00
- Label: Universal Motown (U.S.)
- Producer: Chad Petree, Jeremy Dawson

Shiny Toy Guns chronology
We Are Pilots (2006)	Season of Poison (2008)	Girls Le Disko (2009)

Singles from Season Of Poison
- 1. "Ricochet!" Released: September 2, 2008; 2. "Ghost Town" Released: January 30, 2009

Professional ratings
Aggregate scores
Source	Rating
Metacritic	59/100
Review scores
Source	Rating
Allmusic	3/5 stars
Sputnikmusic	2/5 stars
Stereokill	3.5/5 stars

Season of Poison is the second studio album by American indie rock band Shiny Toy Guns. It was released on November 4, 2008 through Universal Motown Records Group. It peaked at #47 on the Billboard Hot 100 the following week. The album introduced the band's third female vocalist, Sisely Treasure, and was the only studio album to feature her. The album featured two singles: "Ricochet!" and "Ghost Town".

Season of Poison generated far less hype than We Are Pilots and failed to sell well, resulting in a low sales count of 60,000 copies. In 2009, Jeremy Dawson admitted via Shiny Toy Guns' official website that while he believes Season of Poison is a great album, it was indeed too different too soon, and promised a return to their electronic roots for the band's third album.

== Track listing ==
No.	Title	Writer(s)	Length
1.	"When Did This Storm Begin" (featuring Binary Finary)	Jeremy Dawson, Chad Petree, Matthew Laws	4:10
2.	"Money for That"	Dawson, Petree, Tim David Kelly	3:23
3.	"I Owe You a Love Song"	Dawson, Petree, Stephen Petree	3:44
4.	"Ghost Town"	Dawson, Petree, Sisely Treasure	3:43
5.	"It Became a Lie on You"	Petree, S. Petree	4:28
6.	"Ricochet!"	Dawson, Petree, Treasure	2:39
7.	"Season of Love"	Petree, James Auringer	3:06
8.	"Poison"	Dawson	8:14
9.	"Blown Away"	Petree, John Schwandt
10.	"Turned to Real Life"	Dawson	3:44
11.	"Frozen Oceans"	Dawson, Petree	4:46

iTunes bonus track
No.	Title	Length
12.	"A Leading Edge"	2:28

== Charts ==
=== Album ===
Chart (2008)	Peak position
U.S. Billboard 200	47
U.S. Billboard Rock Albums	13
U.S. Billboard Digital Albums	47
U.S. Billboard Alternative Albums	10

=== Singles ===
Year	Song	Alternative Songs
2008	"Ricochet!"	17
2009	"Ghost Town"	26

== Personnel ==
- Sisely Treasure – vocals
- Chad Petree – vocals, guitar
- Jeremy Dawson – keyboards, bass
- Mikey Martin – drums, percussion
