= Rainy Monday =

Single by Shiny Toy Guns

from the album We Are Pilots
- Released: 2008
- Recorded: 2005
- Genre: New wave, synthpop, electronica
- Length: 3:59
- Label: Universal
- Songwriter(s): Chad Petree, Stephen Petree

Shiny Toy Guns singles chronology
| "You Are the One" (2007) | "Rainy Monday" (2008) | "Ricochet!" (2008) |

"Rainy Monday" is the third single by rock group Shiny Toy Guns from their album We Are Pilots. This single peaked at #23 on the Modern Rock Tracks chart.

The song was described by Len Ringhi of The Morning Call as "a faux Peter Gabriel/A-ha blend" which "could be a guilty pleasure".

== Music video ==
The music video shows the band performing the song, with Chad on vocals and guitar, Jeremy on keyboard, Mikey on drums and Carah on bass, with a girl appearing now and again. Every band member is wearing black clothes and has black hair in the video.

== Usage in other media ==
- The track was featured on the television series Viva Laughlin on CBS.
- It was featured on the British programme Waterloo Road.
