= Shiny Toy Guns =

American rock band

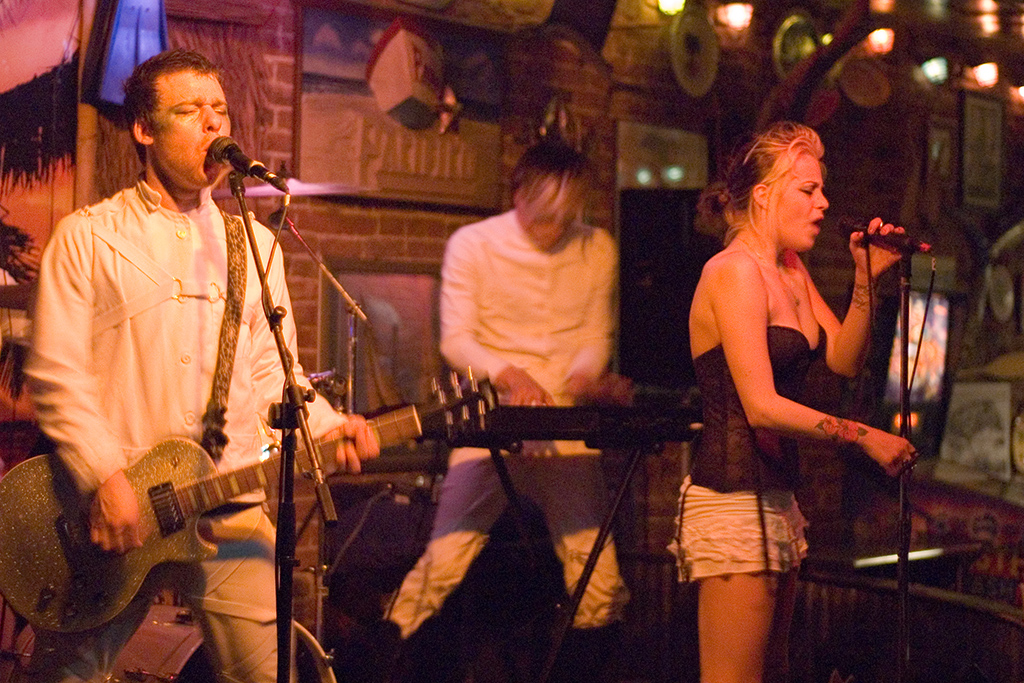
- Shiny Toy Guns concert, 2005, the Burts Tiki Lounge, Utah, USA

Background information
- Origin: Los Angeles, California, United States
- Genres: Indie rock, synthpop, electroclash, post-punk revival, alternative dance
- Years active: 2002–2021 (hiatus)
- Labels: Universal Motown, Mercury, Ultra, Cleopatra
- Spinoffs: Versant
- Spinoff of: Cloud2Ground
- Members: Carah Faye Charnow; Chad Petree; Jeremy Dawson; Mikey Martin
- Past members: Daniel Johansson; Sisely Treasure; Steven Petree
- Website: www.shinytoyguns.com

Shiny Toy Guns is an American rock band formed in Los Angeles, California, in 2002. The band comprises guitarist/vocalist Chad Petree, vocalist/bassist/keyboardist Carah Faye Charnow, keyboardist/bassist Jeremy Dawson, and drummer Mikey Martin.

Their first studio album, We Are Pilots (2006), had three singles peak inside the top 30 in the Alternative Songs Chart and was nominated for Best Electronic/Dance Album at the 50th Grammy Awards. Their second album, Season of Poison (2008), had two singles peak inside the top 30 in the Alternative Songs Chart.

== History ==
=== 2002–2006: Formation and We Are Pilots ===
The band was founded in 2002 by bassist and keyboardist Jeremy Dawson and vocalist and guitarist Chad Petree. Both knew each other for years growing up in Shawnee, Oklahoma, and they had worked together on previous music projects such as Cloud2Ground and Slyder. After these projects, they went underground for a brief time, and they continued making music together, eventually enlisting vocalist Carah Faye Charnow as their female vocalist and drummer Mikey Martin.

Shiny Toy Guns gained popularity in California and on the internet through networking on their MySpace page. In January 2005, they released their first album, We Are Pilots, through the record company Stormwest International. That summer, they toured the United States in support of their album. We Are Pilots was re-recorded and re-released with a revised track list through record company SideCho in November 2005. The band signed with Universal Records in June 2006 and released a third, final version of We Are Pilots on October 17, 2006.

"Le Disko" was the first single, "You Are the One" was the second single, and "Rainy Monday" was the third. However, "Don't Cry Out" was initially announced as the third single.

=== 2007–2008: Season of Poison ===
On October 29, 2007, the band appeared as "The Shinys" on the children's television series Yo Gabba Gabba!. They performed a sequence called The House of Spooks. We Are Pilots received a Grammy Award nomination on December 6, 2007, in the Best Electronic/Dance Album category but lost to The Chemical Brothers.

In August 2008, it was revealed that Carah Faye Charnow was no longer part of the band and had been replaced by Sisely Treasure, whose vocals are featured on the band's second album, Season of Poison. Carah Faye Charnow pursued a new band, Versant, in Sweden. Season of Poison was released through Universal Records on November 4, 2008.

On September 2, 2008, "Ricochet!" was released as the first single. It hit No. 17 on the Alternative Songs Chart, the highest the band has ever reached with a single on the Alternative Songs chart. Shiny Toy Guns released their second Season of Poison single, "Ghost Town," on January 30, 2009, which peaked at No. 26 on the Alternative Songs Chart.

=== 2009–2010: Girls Le Disko ===
In February 2009, the band introduced their Fancorps Street Team as a way for their fans to become more involved with the band. In March, the band released their first animated video for their single, "Ghost Town." The animation was completed by well-known illustrator Glen Hanson.

At the end of March 2009, the band performed a cover of Peter Schilling's "Major Tom (Coming Home)." Initially used in a television commercial for the 2010 Lincoln MKZ, the song was released as a single on May 5, 2009. In September, the band covered Blue Öyster Cult's "Burnin' for You" for another Lincoln commercial advertising the 2010 Lincoln MKS.

On December 15, 2009, the remix album Girls Le Disko was released on Ultra Records. Near the end of January 2010, "Rocketship 2010" was released as a free Myspace download featured on Coca-Cola's Formula for Happiness weekly download. Also, at the end of January, Shiny Toy Guns teamed up with Lincoln again to produce a music video for "Major Tom". In March, a music video was released for "Rocketship 2010" through Ultra Records. "Rocketship 2010" was released as a single on iTunes on April 20, 2010.

In late fall 2010, Shiny Toy Guns announced a planned December 2010 release of an LP tentatively named "III". According to Jeremy, fans "will fall in love with what we [Shiny Toy Guns] are just now starting to work with on this record." On their Facebook, Shiny Toy Guns announced that "Speaking Japanese" would be a single on the next album. December passed without an album drop.

Meanwhile, Chad and Jeremy worked on a side project called Mirror Machines, which has since been postponed in favor of Shiny Toy Guns again.

=== 2011–present: III ===
Early January 2011, Shiny Toy Guns' official website featured a countdown which ended at midnight between February 10 and 11. Below the countdown, read the following text: "You know what you hope is at the end of this timer, but you can't be sure. and it doesn't matter... because we'll be together." The quote is a modified version of a quote from Christopher Nolan's film, Inception. In addition, the piano riff accompanying the countdown mirrors a scale from "Time," a song by Hans Zimmer for the Inception soundtrack.

At the end of January, Shiny Toy Guns relaunched their fan-incorporated street team, the Satellites, stating, "Our closest allies and the most important people in our world are the 2011 SATELLITE team. Join us and become a part of the momentum of Shiny Toy Guns on a first-hand basis. Together, we will reach the eyes and the ears of the world."

In early February, Sisely Treasure released a single, "That You Like," on her website. On February 7, Shiny Toy Guns announced on Facebook that Sisely was no longer part of the band.

On February 11, 2011, at 2:00:00 AM EST, a video posted on the band's website announced that former band member Carah Faye Charnow would be rejoining the band along with her husband, Daniel Johansson, for the upcoming album III. The video contained the song "If I Lost You (Orchestral Mix)". Shortly after the end of the countdown, Versant posted to Facebook, "Boys and Girls, Carah Faye and Daniel Johansson, of your beloved Versant, are joining Shiny Toy Guns for album number three. Please enjoy this piece of music history! Here is another announcement: Versant isn't going ANYWHERE!"

On March 3, 2011, "The Sun," the first single from III, was released. During a web chat, Jeremy explained that they hope III will be ready for a May or June 2011 release but that it may come later this summer. During an interview at SXSW, Jeremy confirmed that the band still hopes for a mid-June release but that mid-August would be more realistic. However, in an interview with LIVE 105, Jeremy said, "Probably [say] November." Also, during the Phoenix Pride Festival in April 2011, another new song, "Stay Down," was sung. On March 1, 2012, in an interview with speedcast.com, Jeremy and Carah announced that the third album was set to release in July, with the first single in May, along with the beginning of a tour. On April 25, 2012, it was announced, via Instagram, that III will finish being mixed on May 6. The album will feature 11 songs.

On May 10, 2012, the band announced via Facebook that Daniel Johansson would be leaving. The band cited the end of Daniel and Carah Faye's long-term relationship as the primary reason, but they would remain friends.

An issue of fljtokyo stated that the album was planned to be released in the fall of 2012.

On June 26, Shiny Toy Guns released a single titled "Waiting Alone" and announced III would be released on October 23, 2012.

On August 26, 2012, the band released their second single from their upcoming album III, titled "Fading Listening".

On October 6, Shiny Toy Guns released the official track listing for the album. The album was officially released on iTunes on October 26, 2012.

In September 2013, Shiny Toy Guns was announced for the maiden voyage of PARAHOY, a four-day Festival Cruise with Paramore, which was expected to set sail on March 7, 2014.

== Members ==
=== Current members ===
- Chad Petree – vocals, guitars (2002–present)
- Jeremy Dawson – keyboards, bass (2002–present)
- Mikey Martin – drums (2004–present)
- Carah Faye Charnow – vocals, keyboards, bass (2003–2008, 2011–present)

=== Former members ===
- Daniel Johansson – guitars, keyboards, bass (2011–2012)
- Sisely Treasure – vocals, keyboards, bass (2008–2010)
- Steven Petree

== Discography ==
=== Studio albums ===
Year	Album	Peak chart positions						Certifications
Year	Album	US	US Alt.	US Heat	US Indie	US Rock	UK	Certifications
2006	We Are Pilots: Released: October 17, 2006; Label: Universal; Format: CD, LP, Digital	90	—	1	—	—	150	
2008	Season of Poison: Released: November 4, 2008; Label: Motown; Format: CD, LP, Digital	47	10	—	—	13	—	
2012	III: Released: October 22, 2012; Label: Five Seven; Format: CD, LP, Digital	69	14	—	14	23	—	

=== EPs ===
- Songs For Film & Tv (2015)

=== Compilation albums ===
- Girls Le Disko (2009)

=== Singles ===
List of singles, with selected chart positions and certifications, showing year released and album name
Title	Year	Peak chart positions							Album
Title	Year	US	US Alt	US Dance	CAN	MEX	SCO	UK	Album
"Le Disko"	2006	— (Note: "Le Disko" did not chart on the Billboard Hot 100 but did peak at number 14 on the Bubbling Under Hot 100 Singles chart, which is an extension of the Billboard Hot 100.)	26	—	— (Note: "Le Disko" did not chart on the Canadian Hot 100 but did peak at number 42 on the Hot Canadian Digital Song Sales chart.)	—	—	—	We Are Pilots
"You Are the One"	2007	—	25	23	—	—	44	94	We Are Pilots
"Rainy Monday"	2007	—	23	—	—	—	—	—	We Are Pilots
"Ricochet!"	2008	—	17	—	—	—	—	—	Season of Poison
"Ghost Town"	2009	—	26	—	—	50	—	—	Season of Poison
"Major Tom (Coming Home)"	2009	97	—	—	46	—	—	—	Girls Le Disko
"Rocketship 2010"	2010	—	—	—	—	—	—	—	Non-album single
"Waiting Alone"	2012	—	—	—	—	—	—	—	III
"Fading Listening"	2012	—	—	—	—	—	—	—	III
"Somewhere to Hide"	2013	—	—	—	—	—	—	—	III
"—" denotes a recording that did not chart or was not released in that territory.

=== Album appearances ===
- Goth Electro Tribute to Depeche Mode – (October 4, 2005; contributed "Stripped")
- Goth Electro Tribute to Prince – (July 4, 2006); contributed "Nothing Compares 2 U")
- This is Rave-Electro – (January 1, 2007; contributed "Stripped")
- Gothic Divas – (January 1, 2007; contributed "Stripped")
- Blood & Chocolate Soundtrack – (January 23, 2007; contributed "Stripped")
- Monster New Wave Hits – (April 24, 2007; contributed "Stripped")
- Bam Margera Presents – Viva La Bands, Vol. 2 - (September 4, 2007; contributed "Rocketship")
- Nightmare Revisited – (September 30, 2008; contributed "Finale/Reprise")
