= The Different Story (World of Lust and Crime) (song) =

Single by Peter Schilling

from the album The Different Story (World of Lust and Crime)
- Released: 1989
- Recorded: 1988
- Genre: Neue Deutsche Welle, new wave, synthpop
- Songwriter(s): Hubert Kemmler, Peter Schilling, Susanne Sigl
- Producer(s): Michael Cretu

Peter Schilling singles chronology
"Alles Endet Bei Dir" / "Wonderful World" (1986)	"The Different Story (World of Lust and Crime)" (1989)	"Zug Um Zug" (1992)

Music video
- "The Different Story (World of Lust and Crime)" on YouTube

"The Different Story (World of Lust and Crime)" is a song by Peter Schilling from the album of the same name. The song was produced by Michael Cretu, and was released on 25 October 1988.

The song contains female vocals by Susanne Müller-Pi along with boisterous singing from Schilling himself.

== Charts ==
While the video was a top ten pop hit in Sweden, the album from which it came did not fare as well likely due to the previously released tracks on the album. The song did however, reach No. 16 on the Billboard Dance chart and was his most recent pop hit in the United States, reaching No. 61 on the Hot 100 in 1989.

== Video ==
The video portrays Schilling on horseback, with Müller-Pi dancing and singing in a white dress.
