= Rocketship 2010 =

Single by Shiny Toy Guns
- Released: April 20, 2010
- Recorded: 2009
- Genre: Indie rock, new wave, progressive rock, alternative dance
- Length: 3.17
- Label: Ultra Records
- Songwriters: Chad Petree, Jeremy Dawson

Shiny Toy Guns singles chronology
"Major Tom (Coming Home)" (2009)	"Rocketship 2010" (2010)	"Waiting Alone" (2012)

"Rocketship 2010" is the seventh single released by the band Shiny Toy Guns.

== Music video ==
The music video was released in March 2010 through Ultra Records. The main protagonist of the video (which does not feature the band) is a robot who sneaks into a nightclub where robots are not allowed. He attempts to socialize with the human club goers but none are willing to talk to him. Just when it seems like all hope is lost, the robot spots a female robot across the club and instantly falls for her. The female robot likewise falls for the male robot upon seeing him. After sharing a passionate kiss, the two robots fly away together into outer space.

== Track listing ==
iTunes single.

1. "Rocketship 2010" (Radio Edit)
2. "Rocketship 2010" (Starkillers Remix)
3. "Rocketship 2010" (Starkillers Dub)
