= III (Shiny Toy Guns album) =

Studio album by Shiny Toy Guns
- Released: October 22, 2012
- Recorded: 2011–2012
- Studio: Beta Records Studios; Dangerous Insect Studios; RMC Studios; Stormwest
- Genre: Synth-pop; new wave
- Length: 43:55
- Label: Five Seven
- Producer: Carah Faye; Daniel Johansson; Mirror Machines; Mark Saunders; Timothy "Q" Wiles

Shiny Toy Guns chronology
Girls Le Disko (2009)	III (2012)

Singles from III
- 1. "Waiting Alone" Released: June 26, 2012; 2. "Fading Listening" Released: August 28, 2012; 3. "Somewhere to Hide" Released: May 13, 2013

III is the third studio album by American indie rock band Shiny Toy Guns. It was released on October 22, 2012, by Five Seven Music. The album features the return of the band's original female vocalist, Carah Faye Charnow. The album spawned three singles: "Waiting Alone", "Fading Listening", and "Somewhere to Hide".

== Track listing ==
No.	Title	Writer(s)	Producer(s)	Length
1.	"Somewhere to Hide"	Carah Faye	Mirror Machines; Carah Faye; Daniel Johansson	3:22
2.	"Waiting Alone"	Jeremy Dawson; Chad Petree	Mirror Machines	3:14
3.	"Carrie"	Chad Petree; Jeremy Dawson; Carah Faye	Mirror Machines	3:49
4.	"If I Lost You"	Jeremy Dawson	Mirror Machines	4:13
5.	"Speaking Japanese"	Jeremy Dawson; Chad Petree; Carah Faye; Daniel Johansson	Mirror Machines	3:06
6.	"Mercy"	Jeremy Dawson; Chad Petree; Y. Sherman	Mirror Machines; Mark Saunders (additional production)	4:24
7.	"Wait for Me"	Chad Petree; Jeremy Dawson; Carah Faye	Mirror Machines	5:50
8.	"Fading Listening"	Chad Petree; Carah Faye	Mirror Machines	3:26
9.	"The Sun"	Jeremy Dawson; Chad Petree	Mirror Machines; Timothy "Q" Wiles (additional production)	3:15
10.	"e v a y"	Chad Petree; Jeremy Dawson; Stephen Petree	Mirror Machines	5:20
11.	"Take Me Back to Where I Was"	Chad Petree	Mirror Machines	3:56

iTunes Store deluxe edition bonus tracks
No.	Title	Length
12.	"My Reptile Friend"	4:33
13.	"Stay Down"	3:19
14.	"Waiting Alone" (music video)	6:44
15.	"III – Up Close and Personal" (video)	7:13

== Personnel ==
Credits adapted from the liner notes of III.

Shiny Toy Guns

- Carah Faye – vocals, bass, synth (all tracks); production (track 1)
- Chad Petree – vocals, guitar
- Jeremy Dawson – bass, synth
- Mikey Martin – drums

Additional personnel

- Matty Bernstein – recording (track 11)
- Justin Hergett – mixing (track 11)
- Daniel Johansson – production (track 1)
- Joe LaPorta – mastering
- Emily Lazar – mastering
- Tony Maserati – mixing
- Mirror Machines – engineering, production, programming, recording (all tracks); mixing (tracks 6–8, 10, 11)
- Benjy Russell – cover artwork photography
- Mark Saunders – additional production (track 6)
- Ben Schwartz – cover artwork package design
- Chris Tabron – mixing (tracks 6–8, 10)
- Timothy "Q" Wiles – additional production (track 9)

== Charts ==
Chart (2012)	Peak position
US Billboard 200	69
US Independent Albums (Billboard)	14
US Top Alternative Albums (Billboard)	14
US Top Rock Albums (Billboard)	23
