= Carah Faye Charnow =

American singer and songwriter

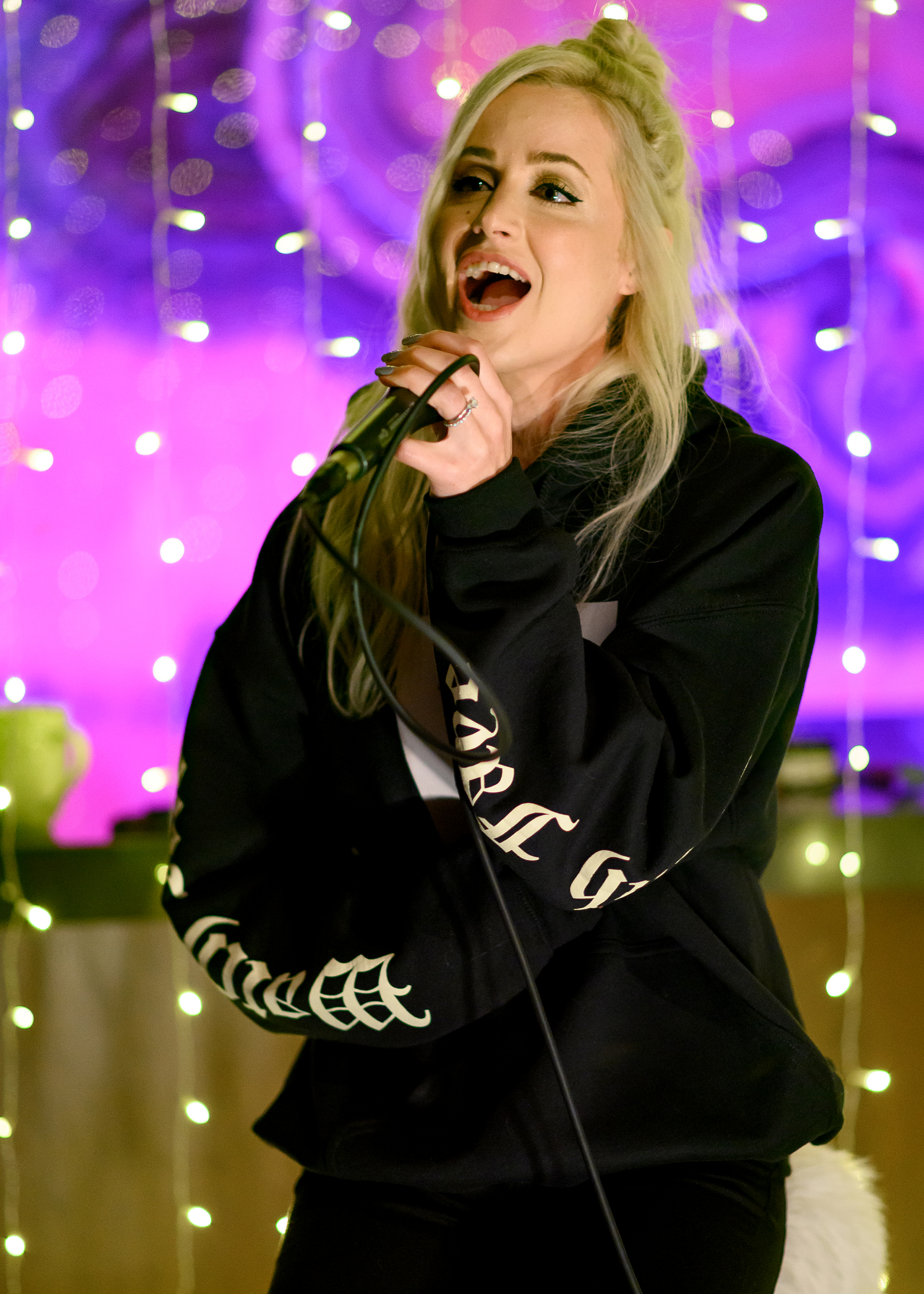
- Carah Faye performing in 2018

Background information
- Also known as: Carah Faye, Carah Charnow
- Born: August 3, 1984 (age 42); Santa Barbara, California, U.S.
- Origin: Newbury Park, California, United States
- Genres: Rock
- Occupations: Singer, songwriter
- Instruments: Bass; keyboards; tambourine; timpani; drums; vocals
- Years active: 2004–present

Carah Faye Charnow (born August 3, 1984) is an American singer and songwriter. She is the co-lead vocalist, bassist, and occasional keyboardist of the band Shiny Toy Guns (2004–2008, 2010–present), with whom she received a Grammy nomination. She also fronted the band Versant and has released multiple songs under her own name as a solo artist.

== Solo career ==
=== Songwriting ===
Carah co-wrote the song "Stay the Night," which is performed by Zedd and Hayley Williams.

=== On tour ===
Carah performed as the opening act for Lindsey Stirling’s Summer 2016 tour.

=== Collaborations ===
Carah is the featured vocalist/Co-writer of Lindsey Stirling’s song “Where Do We Go.” The song is part of Lindsey's 2016 album Brave Enough.

=== “Don't Say a Word” ===
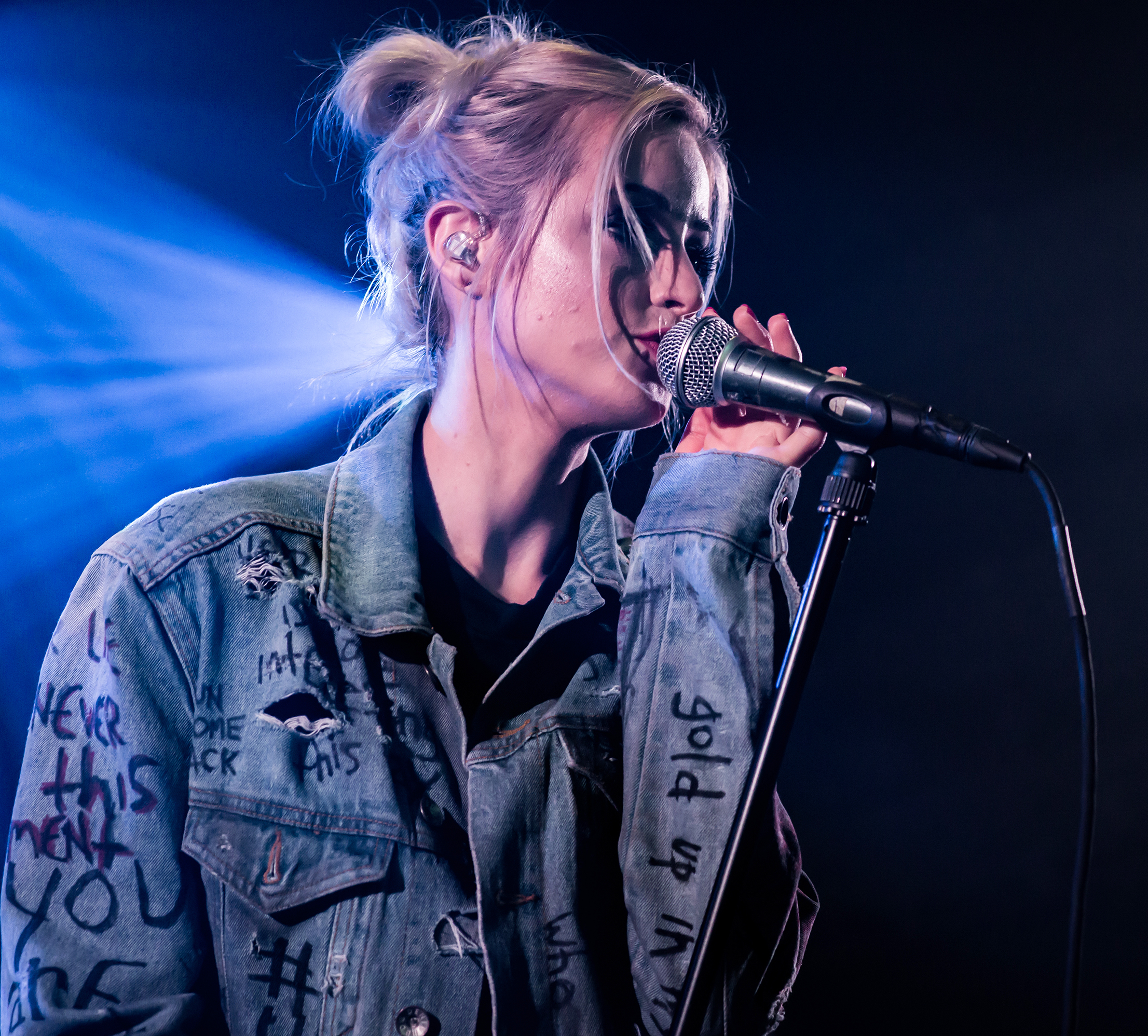
Carah Faye performing in 2016

On July 25, 2016, Carah released her first solo single, a song titled “Don't Say a Word.”

=== “Gold Plated” ===
“Gold Plated,” Carah's second solo single, was released on October 12, 2016. The music video for the single was released on November 3, 2017. She later made a Twitter post saying that she will release a new song on June 22, 2018, as well as a post saying she will release an EP on her birthday (August 3.)

=== “Watch Me - EP” ===
Carah's debut solo EP, “Watch Me,” was released on August 3, 2018. The album artwork was revealed on July 16. The record contains the songs “Watch Me,” “Gold Plated,” “We Go Back,” “Change in the Water,” and “Fine.”

== Bands ==
=== Shiny Toy Guns (2004–2008) ===
In 2004, Carah joined the indie/rock/electronica band Shiny Toy Guns. The band gained popularity in California as well as through their Myspace page. On October 17, 2006, they released their first album, We Are Pilots (UNI-MOTOWN), after previously recording and independently releasing it two times with varying track lists. The album’s best-known tracks are "Le Disko", "You Are the One", and "Don't Cry Out". On December 6, 2007, We Are Pilots received a Grammy Award nomination in the category of Best Electronic/Dance Album. Carah remained the female vocalist of Shiny Toy Guns until she was released due to conflict scheduling in the band's follow-up album to "We Are Pilots".

=== Versant (2008–2012) ===
After her release from Shiny Toy Guns, Carah started a new band, Versant. Samples of their songs "Push Away," "Out Of Touch," "Quick Escapes," and "Heartbeats" were posted on their MySpace page, and the full versions are included on their self-released digital EP heartbeats ep, released on September 21, 2010.

=== Shiny Toy Guns (again, 2011-present) ===
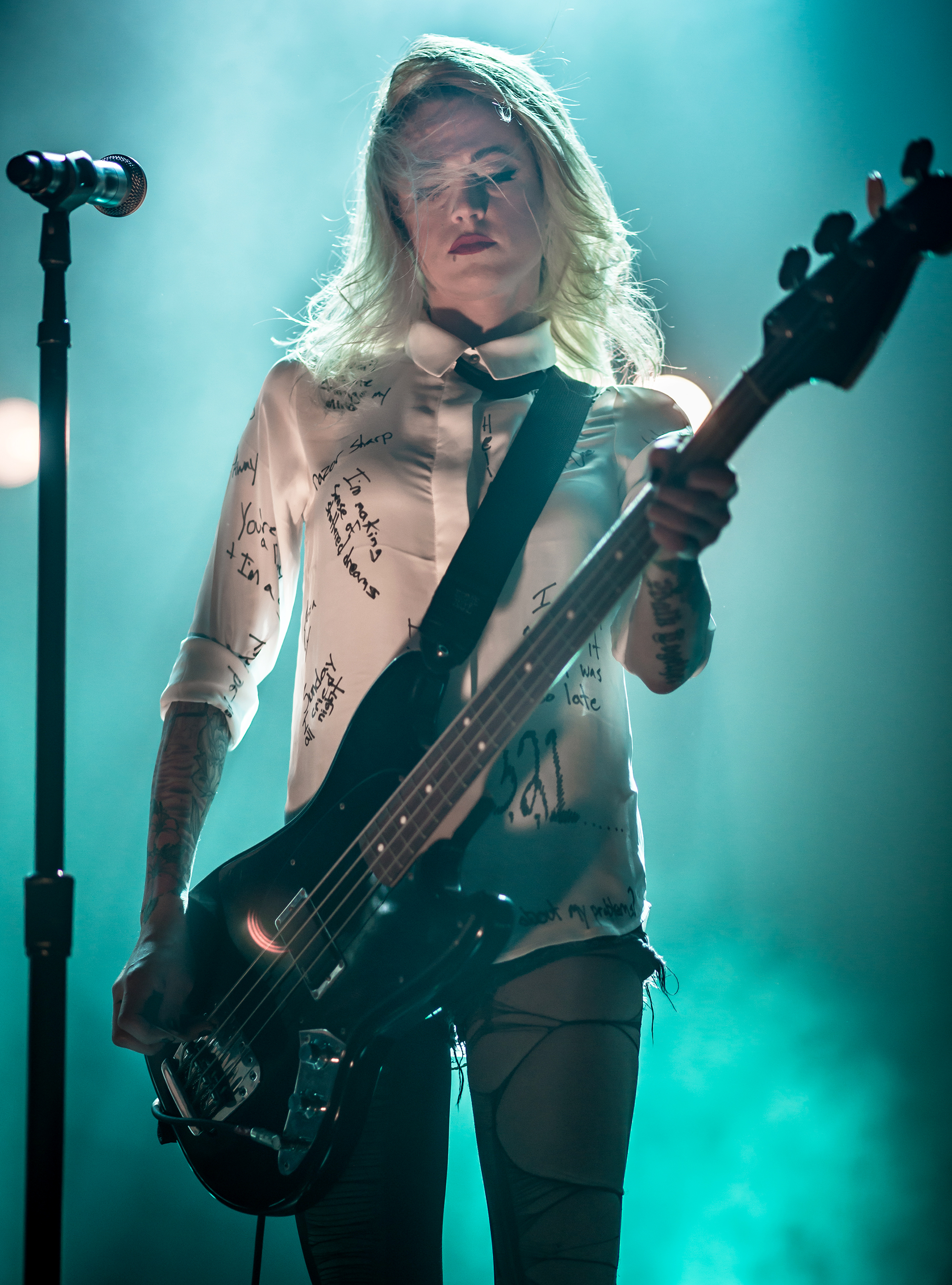
Carah Faye with Shiny Toy Guns performing in 2017

As of February 11, 2011, it was announced at the end of the Shiny Toy Guns' countdown timer in a YouTube video that Carah was part of the band again. Versant was also quoted on Facebook saying, "Boys and Girls, Carah Faye and Daniel Johansson, of your beloved Versant, are joining Shiny Toy Guns for album number three. Please enjoy this piece of music history! Here is another announcement: Shiny Toy Guns isn't going ANYWHERE!" Carah Faye was featured in the band's music video of their new single "Waiting Alone," a song from their 2012 album III. The album's third single, "Somewhere to Hide," was written entirely by Carah.

As of early 2015, Carah is writing and recording a solo album, but assures fans that Shiny Toy Guns is still intact.

== Personal life ==
Carah was born in Santa Barbara and moved to Newbury Park at age 5. She began vocal training with one of the original Chordettes members and joined a professional show choir called Fresh Chances for America (with performances at events and venues like the Reagan Library and Amway Diamond Convention).

Carah's earliest muse was her grandfather, Arnold Moselle, a World War II fighting captain who sang in a "big band-ish" group called The Nightingales. He used to sing lullabies to her including Frank Sinatra and Nat King Cole songs, and he encouraged her to pursue a musical career.

In early 2004, Jeremy Dawson invited Carah to sing for Shiny Toy Guns. She remained the female vocalist of this band until the summer of 2008. Almost immediately after her sudden release from Shiny Toy Guns, her band Versant began to form in Sweden. In a February 2009 interview.

On February 11, 2011, it was revealed that Carah had re-joined Shiny Toy Guns as their co-lead singer.

In October 2018 she was married to Spencer Peterson. The couple welcomed their first child in 2019.

Charnow is straight edge and states to have never drunk, smoked or used recreational drugs.
