= Le Disko =

Single by Shiny Toy Guns

from the album We Are Pilots
- Released: August 7, 2006
- Recorded: 2005
- Studio: California
- Genre: Electroclash, electronic rock
- Length: 3:23
- Label: Universal Motown
- Songwriters: Jeremy Dawson, Stephen Petree

Shiny Toy Guns singles chronology
"Le Disko" (2006)	"You Are the One" (2007)

"Le Disko" is the first single by rock group Shiny Toy Guns from their album We Are Pilots. In the United States, it peaked at No. 26 on the Modern Rock Tracks chart and No. 14 on the Billboard Bubbling Under Hot 100 Singles chart. It reached No. 42 on the Hot Canadian Digital Singles chart.

== Track listing ==
US promo single
No.	Title	Length
1.	"Le Disko" (Clean Edit)	3:25
2.	"Starts with One"	3:46

UK promo single
No.	Title	Length
1.	"Le Disko" (Original)	3:23
2.	"Le Disko" (Tommie Sunshine Mix)	7:33

7" single

Side A
No.	Title	Length
1.	"Le Disko"	3:23

Side B
No.	Title	Length
2.	"Starts with One"	3:45

12" single

Side A
No.	Title	Length
1.	"Le Disko" (Tommie Sunshine Brooklyn Fire Retouch)	7:33
2.	"Le Disko" (Original Mix)	3:23

Side B
No.	Title	Length
1.	"Le Disko" (Boys Noize Fire Mix)	5:56
2.	"Le Disko" (Boys Noize Fire Dub)	5:56

== Music video ==
There are three music videos for "Le Disko":

- The first involves the band performing in a desert-like area while soldiers run around and mimic children, showing that they are "little boys" with "little toys." It uses the version of "Le Disko" found on We Are Pilots version 1.
- The second is filmed on a green screen. It involves Carah dancing and romancing the men of the band, only to strangle them to death. It uses the version of "Le Disko" found on We Are Pilots version 1.
- The third, focused on the band playing in a club, is the official version. The primary character of focus is of a young man. He is seduced by a woman that dances with him after breaking from dancing with another woman. Eventually most of the women turn into Kafkaesque monsters and murder the men. It uses the version of "Le Disko" found on We Are Pilots.

== Charts ==
Chart (2006–07)	Peak position
US Alternative Airplay (Billboard)	26
US Bubbling Under Hot 100 (Billboard)	14
