= Versant (band) =

- Origin: Newbury Park, California, United States and Vänersborg, Sweden
- Genres: Alternative rock Synthpop
- Years active: 2008-2012
- Labels: Versant Music
- Members: Carah Faye Charnow; Daniel Johansson; Nicholas Oja
- Past members: Johan Grettve; Richard Ankers
- Website: www.versantmusic.com at the Wayback Machine (archived December 8, 2013)

Versant was a Swedish and American band from Vänersborg, Sweden and Newbury Park, California that formed in the summer of 2008. Versant features vocalist Carah Faye Charnow, of the band Shiny Toy Guns, guitarist/keyboardist Daniel Johansson, drummer Richard Ankers, formerly of the band Melody Club, Johan Grettve, and bassist Nicholas Oja.

== History ==
After she was released from Shiny Toy Guns in the summer of 2008, Carah Faye Charnow and Daniel Johansson, who produced the title track of The Sounds' album Crossing the Rubicon, formed Versant. Together they searched out bandmates Richard Ankers (no longer a member), Johan Grettve (no longer a member), and Nicholas Oja to complete the line-up.

In 2009, Versant released two demos on their MySpace page; "Push Away" and "Out of Touch".

On February 14, 2009, Versant released a special Valentine's Day video for their fans on Vimeo. The instrumental track in the background appears to be the "roots" of the demo "Quick Escapes", which leaked online in November 2009 but has since been removed. "Quick Escapes" was eventually released as the band's debut single.

In the Fall of 2009, Versant posted a cover contest on their MySpace page. They accepted song submissions from their fans and held a vote for the song that they should perform. On October 9, 2009, Versant released a live video of them performing S.O.S. by the Swedish band ABBA on YouTube as their contest winner.

Versant played their first two shows in Sweden in November 2009.

Versant's debut EP Heartbeats was digitally self-released on September 21, 2010. The track listing is: 1) "Heartbeats" 2) "Push Away" 3) "Quick Escapes" 4) "Out of Touch". On October 21, 2010, Versant released "Quick Escapes" as their debut single.

On September 24, 2010, the band began selling a limited edition autographed CD version of their EP from their website store. This version was limited to 250 copies, each of which were numbered and autographed by Carah and Daniel. These copies were quick to sell out. The regular (unsigned) CD version of the EP went on sale on November 23, 2010 from their website store.

In early 2011 Carah Faye and Daniel Johansson joined Shiny Toy Guns in time for their third album, III, released in October 2012. Faye and Johansson were separated before the album III came out, and Daniel went back to Sweden to work on new music.

Chatting with Carah Faye on March 6, 2013 after the Shiny Toy Guns show in Omaha, Nebraska, U.S.A., she confirmed that she has no desire to work on new music for Versant because of her breakup with Johansson.

== Band members ==
Current members

- Carah Faye Charnow – vocals
- Daniel Johansson – guitar, keyboards
- Nicholas Oja – bass

Past members

- Johan Grettve – guitar, keyboards (2008–2010)
- Richard Ankers – drums (2008–2010)

== Discography ==
- Heartbeats EP (2010)
