= Francis Soto Band =

Heavy metal band

- Origin: Stuttgart, Germany
- Genres: Heavy metal, hard rock
- Years active: 2006–present
- Labels: Entertainment Schlesinger
- Members: Francis Soto; Mathias Holm; Markus Metzger; Conny Payne; Axel Winkler
- Past members: Andy Gaube; Kersten Noczinski; Andy Zeimn; Lothar L.K. Knörle

Francis Soto Band is a German-Swedish heavy metal band from Stuttgart, Germany.

== History ==
Head of the band is Francis Soto, who was vocalist for Sabol's band Dark Horse in the early '90s. Soto was also the former frontman for the hard rock bands Picasso, Mystery, Silk & Steel, Sanvoisen, Subway, Turn Up and Wicked Sensation. Their debut single was a cover of the Corey Hart song "Sunglasses at Night", released in 2007 and in the same year their album Metalapolis 1 was released.

On 1 April 2008, Mathias Holm joined as guitarist, Andy Gaube left the band and the group was reformed as a German-Swedish project. In early 2010, the band released its album Lolas Themes, which followed the 2007's Metalapolis Part 1 and 2008's demo Dedicated.

=== Musical style ===
The band's music is in various styles of rock from traditional hard rock to modern rock, with influences from gothic and pop rock.

== Members ==
Current line-up

- Francis Soto (Vocals)
- Eugen Leonhard (Guitar)
- Markus Metzger (Keyboards and programming)
- Frank Herold (Bass)
- Bernd Heining (Drums)

Guest musicians

- Jonas (The Godfather)
- Hoernqvist (Guitar)
- Thomas Larson (Guitar)
- Lars Ratz (Bass)
- Peter Oko (Guitar)
- Andy Zeimn (Guitar and bass)
- Bernd Heining (Drums)
- Eric Rauti (Guitar)
- Sina Nicklas (Vocals)
- Vesa Nupponen (Guitar)
- Tobias Benjamin Frank (Guitar)
- Anke Sobek (Bass)
- Theo Heidfeld (Drums)

=== Former members ===
- Mathias Holm (Guitar)
- Conny Payne (Bass)
- Lothar L.K. Knörle (Guitar, arrangement and idea of "Sunglasses at Night" cover version)
- Andy Gaube (Guitar)
- Andy Zeimn (Bass)
- Kersten Noczinski (Drums)

== Discography ==
=== Albums ===
- 2006: The Journey
- 2007: Metalapolis Part 1
- 2010: Lolas Themes

=== Singles ===
- 2007: "Sunglasses at Night"

=== Demo ===
- 2008: Dedicated
