= Cloud2Ground =

American music duo

- Also known as: Slyder; R.R.D.S.
- Genres: EDM, epic trance, progressive house, DnB, trip hop
- Years active: 1996-2003
- Label: N*Soul Records
- Spinoffs: Shiny Toy Guns
- Past members: Jeremy Dawson; Chad Petree
- Website: slyder.clan.su

Cloud2Ground (sometimes stylized in all lowercase) was an American electronic dance music production duo, consisting of Jeremy Dawson and Chad Petree. Dawson and Petree grew up in Shawnee, Oklahoma, and met when they were teenagers. They played together in various bands, before separating to pursue other projects. Dawson began Cloud2Ground as a solo project and released his first demo under the name in 1996. In 1997 he signed to N*Soul Records and released the album E-Majn the same year. In 1998 he was rejoined by Petree, and in 1999 they moved to Los Angeles. In 2000, they released a second album, The Gate (Beautiful).

Cloud2Ground's music encompassed a wide range of dance music styles, such as epic trance, progressive house, drum and bass and trip hop. Dawson has stated that their favourite groups were Enigma, Delirious? and Pink Floyd; he has also named Jesus Jones, Lightning Seeds, The Cure, Nine Inch Nails and Vangelis amongst his own personal musical influences. Dawson's Christian beliefs also played a fundamental role in the band's music. The liner notes of the 1996 demo album read: "All music is created under the influence of Jesus Christ" and the liner notes of E-Majn read: "Love through Music, Through Christ Everlasting, Not through doctrine, legalism, or fundamentals, religion and its leaders, denominations, closed minds, homophobia, and the fear of the unknown, nothing more exists but your body, your spirit, your bible, and a God that loves you". Equipment used by the band included the Access Virus B, the Nord Lead 2, the Roland XV-3080 and the Korg Trinity.

Dawson and Petree were also known as Slyder, a side project through which they released harder, techno-oriented music. Other aliases included R.R.D.S. and Right Bros. Two Slyder tracks – "Neo (The One)" and "Score (Original Mix)" – and the R.R.D.S. track "Innerbattle" featured in the 2001 video game Grand Theft Auto III. As of 2010, Dawson and Petree are members of the band Shiny Toy Guns, which they formed in 2003.

== Releases ==
=== As Cloud2Ground ===
- "cloud2ground" (Album, 1996)
- "E-Majn" (Album, 1997)
- "The Gate (Beautiful)" (Album, 2000)

=== As R.R.D.S. ===
- "Innerbattle" (Single, 2001)

=== As Slyder ===
- "Score" (Single, 2000)
- "Multiple Cats / Jetscream" (Single, 2001)
- "Neo (The One)" (Single, 2001)
- "What Happens" (Single, 2002)
- "The Valley of Sound" (Test Pressing, 2003)

== See also ==
- Grand Theft Auto III soundtrack, Rise FM
