= We Are Pilots =

Studio album by Shiny Toy Guns
- Released: October 17, 2006
- Recorded: 2006
- Genre: New wave; electroclash; indie rock; post-punk revival; synth-pop
- Length: 44:19
- Label: Universal Motown (US); Mercury (UK)
- Producer: Jeremy Dawson, Chad Petree, Mark Saunders

Shiny Toy Guns chronology
We Are Pilots (2006)	Season of Poison (2008)

Singles from We Are Pilots
- 1. "Le Disko" Released: August 7, 2006; 2. "You Are the One" Released: April 23, 2007; 3. "Rainy Monday" Released: 2008

Professional ratings
Review scores
Source	Rating
AllMusic	4/5 stars
Blender	3/5 stars

We Are Pilots is the debut studio album by American electronic rock band Shiny Toy Guns. After previously being independently released throughout 2005, it was officially released on October 17, 2006, through Universal Motown in the United States and Mercury Records in the United Kingdom, with liner notes of the album referring to it as "version 3.0". Production, recording, and writing dates back as far as the early 2000s, with several songs being written during founding members Gregori Chad Petree and Jeremy Dawson's previous project, Dangerous Insects. Musically, We Are Pilots primarily uses influences of both rock music and electronic music, including elements of alternative rock, indie rock, pop, electropop, post-punk revival and disco, with the band receiving comparisons to The Killers and Franz Ferdinand.

We Are Pilots received generally positive reviews from music critics, with some complimenting its "refreshing" and "retro" sound whilst others criticized it as "lifeless" and "unoriginal". It topped the Billboard Heatseekers Album chart whilst also reaching number 90 on the Billboard 200. It was nominated for Best Electronic/Dance Album at the 50th Grammy Awards. The album spawned three singles: "Le Disko", "You Are the One" and "Rainy Monday", all of which peaked within the Alternative Songs chart.

== Track listing ==
All songs written by Jeremy Dawson, except where noted.

1. "You Are the One" (Dawson, Chad Petree, Stephen Petree) – 4:30
2. "Le Disko" (Dawson, S. Petree) – 3:23
3. "Starts with One" (C. Petree) – 3:45
4. "When They Came for Us" – 4:24
5. "Don't Cry Out" (Dawson, C. Petree) – 4:10
6. "Chemistry of a Car Crash" (C. Petree, Dan Leone) – 3:51
7. "Waiting" (C. Petree) – 4:21
8. "Rainy Monday" (S. Petree, C. Petree) – 3:59
9. "Jackie Will Save Me" – 3:59
10. "Shaken" (Dawson, S. Petree) – 3:43
11. "We Are Pilots" – 4:14

=== Bonus Tracks and Special Editions ===
- "I Promise You Walls" – 4:08 (Best Buy exclusive bonus track)
- "Rocketship" – 3:32 (UK exclusive bonus track)
- "Weather Girl" – 4:42 (iTunes exclusive bonus track)
- "Le Disko (Tommie Sunshine's Brooklyn Fire Retouch)" – 7:31 (iTunes exclusive bonus track)

== Charts ==
=== Album ===
Chart (2007)	Peak position
U.S. Billboard 200	90
U.S. Billboard Digital Albums	90
U.S. Billboard Heatseekers Albums	1

=== Singles ===
Year	Song	U.S. Hot 100	U.S. Modern Rock	U.S. Dance Airplay	UK Singles Chart
2006	"Le Disko"	114	26	—	—
2007	"You Are the One"	—	25	23	94
2007	"Rainy Monday"	—	23	—	—

== Earlier versions ==
=== Version 1 ===
Album artwork for Version 1 of We Are Pilots

We Are Pilots was first released by Stormwest International on January 1, 2005.

1. "Don't Cry Out" – 4:15
2. "Rainy Monday" – 3:59
3. "Photograph" – 3:54
4. "Le Disko" – 3:28
5. "Shaken" – 3:56
6. "Turn to Real Life" – 3:30
7. "We Are Pilots" – 4:02
8. "Weather Girl" – 4:42
9. "Waiting" – 4:25
10. "When They Came for Us" – 4:27
11. "Joel's Theme" – 2:52
12. "Sky Fell Over Me" – 3:56
13. "Ritz" – 2:46
14. "Rocketship" – 3:28
15. "I Promise You Walls" – 4:11

=== Version 2 ===
Album artwork for Version 2 of We Are Pilots

The second version of We Are Pilots was released by SideCho Records on November 15, 2005. For this album the tracks were re-recorded and the track listing re-organized; several tracks were removed and two new tracks were added. It also included a more complete CD booklet with lyrics and different artwork.

1. "Le Disko" – 3:23
2. "You Are the One" – 4:20
3. "Don't Cry Out" – 4:06
4. "Rainy Monday" – 3:55
5. "We Are Pilots" – 4:04
6. "Shaken" – 3:44
7. "Turn to Real Life" – 3:26
8. "Waiting" – 4:19
9. "When They Came for Us" – 4:23
10. "Weather Girl" – 4:38
11. "Photograph" – 3:50
12. "Stripped" – 3:30

== Usage in other media ==
- "Le Disko" was featured on an episode of The Real World: Sydney, in the soundtrack of the video game Burnout Dominator, on an episode of So You Think You Can Dance in Lacey Schwimmer's solo, in episode 2 season 4 "Livin La Vida Loca" of The L Word, in episode "Things I Forgot at Birth" of One Tree Hill, and on the soundtrack for the snowboard film People by MDP.
- "Le Disko" is included in Logic Pro 8 as an entire session file.
- "Le Disko" was also used as lead song on an America's Next Top Model cycle 8 commercial, in a commercial for the new season of Dancing with the Stars, in an advertisement for the Asia Extreme series on the Sundance Channel, a commercial in Australia for Honda CR-V, and a commercial for the Motorola RAZR2.
- "Weather Girl" was featured on an episode of The Real World: Denver
- "You Are the One" was featured in a promo for ABC's hit television series Private Practice, and on the 2009 edition of the UK series Hell's Kitchen.
- "Don't Cry Out" was used on the soundtrack for the snowboard film Follow Me Around by MDP.
- "Starts With One" was used on the soundtrack for the extreme cycling film New World Disorder 8: Smackdown. It was also used during a trailer for Smallville on the British entertainment channel e4 in December 2008.
- "You Are the One", "Le Disko", "Rainy Monday", "Dont Cry Out", "Starts With One" and "Waiting" were all featured on the British programme Waterloo Road.
- "Le Disko" was featured in the horror film Sorority Row in September 2009.
- "Weather Girl" was used in the film Getting That Girl in early 2014.

== Personnel ==
- Carah Faye Charnow – vocals
- Chad Petree – vocals, guitar
- Jeremy Dawson – synthesizers, programming
- Mikey Martin – drums

== Nominations ==
- Grammy Awards - Best Electronic/Dance Album
