= Error in the System =

Studio album by Peter Schilling
- Released: 24 March 1983 (English version); 3 July 1982 (German version)
- Studios: Peer-Southern Studios, Hamburg, Germany
- Genres: New wave; Neue Deutsche Welle; synthpop
- Length: 35:42 (English version); 37:54 (German version)
- Languages: English; German
- Labels: Elektra (US); WEA (GER)
- Producers: Armin Sabol; Peter Schilling

Peter Schilling chronology
| Error in the System (1983) | Things to Come (1985) |

Singles from Fehler im System/Error in the System
- 1. "Major Tom (Völig losgelöst)" Released: 1982; 2. "Die Wüste lebt" Released: 1983; 3. "Major Tom (Coming Home)" Released: 1983

Professional ratings
Review scores
| Source | Rating |
|---|---|
| AllMusic | 4.5/5 stars |

Error in the System is the English-language debut album by German singer-songwriter Peter Schilling, and is the counterpart to the German-language album Fehler im System, released through Elektra Records on 24 March 1983. The English and German versions have been combined and sold as a single box set in several parts of the world.

== Singles ==
The English version contains the song "Major Tom (Coming Home)", which reached the top 15 in New Zealand and the US, and the top 50 in the UK. The German version includes the songs "Major Tom (Völlig losgelöst)", which reached number one in Germany, Austria and Switzerland and number two on the Dutch Top 40, as well as "Die Wüste lebt". Because "Major Tom (Coming Home)" was his one and only entry into the top 40 on the US charts, he is generally considered a one-hit wonder in that country.

== Track listings ==
=== Error in the System ===
All lyrics are written by Peter Schilling and David Lodge, except where noted; all music is composed by Peter Schilling, except where noted.

Side one
| No. | Title | Lyrics | Music | Length |
|---|---|---|---|---|
| 1. | "Only Dreams" | | | 3:22 |
| 2. | "Lifetime Guarantee" | | Armin Sabol | 6:20 |
| 3. | "The Noah Plan" | | | 4:21 |
| 4. | "Error in the System" | Schilling; Matthew Garey | | 3:35 |
| 5. | "Fast alles konstruiert" (Cassette release only) | Schilling | Sabol | 6:20 |
| 6. | "Major Tom (Völlig Losgelöst)" (Cassette release only) | Schilling | | 4:08 |

Side two
| No. | Title | Lyrics | Music | Length |
|---|---|---|---|---|
| 1. | "Major Tom (Coming Home)" | | | 5:03 |
| 2. | "Major Tom, Part II" (Instrumental) | | Sabol | 3:35 |
| 3. | "(Let's Play) U.S.A." | Schilling; Garey | Sabol | 3:18 |
| 4. | "I Have No Desire" | Schilling; Garey | | 3:22 |
| 5. | "Stille Nacht, Heilige Nacht" (Cassette release only) | Traditional | Traditional; arr. Sabol/Schilling | 3:26 |
| 6. | "Dann trügt der Schein" (Cassette release only) | Schilling | | 3:22 |
| 7. | "Die Wüste lebt" (Cassette release only) | Schilling | | 4:21 |

=== Fehler im System ===
All lyrics are written by Peter Schilling, except where noted; all music is composed by Peter Schilling, except where noted.

Side one
| No. | Title | Music | Length |
|---|---|---|---|
| 1. | "... Dann trügt der Schein" | | 3:28 |
| 2. | "Fast alles konstruiert" | Sabol | 6:48 |
| 3. | "Die Wüste lebt" | | 4:56 |
| 4. | "Fehler im System" | | 3:30 |

Side two
| No. | Title | Lyrics | Music | Length |
|---|---|---|---|---|
| 1. | "Major Tom (Völlig losgelöst)" | | | 4:59 |
| 2. | "Major Tom" | | Sabol; Schilling | 3:50 |
| 3. | "U.S.A." | | Sabol | 3:22 |
| 4. | "Ich hab' keine Lust" | | | 3:31 |
| 5. | "Stille Nacht, Heilige Nacht" | Traditional | Traditional; arr. Sabol/Schilling | 3:30 |
| Total length: | | | | 37:54 |

== Personnel ==
=== Musicians ===
- Peter Schilling – all vocals
- Armin Sabol – guitars (all tracks), additional bass (on "Stille Nacht, Heilige Nacht")
- Rolf Kersting – bass (all tracks except "Major Tom")
- Gunther Gebauer – bass (on "Major Tom")
- Frank Hieber – keyboards (all tracks except "Major Tom")
- Gonzo Bishop – keyboards (on "Major Tom")
- Dicky Tarrach – drums, percussion (all tracks except "The Noah Plan" and "Major Tom")
- Mickie Stickdorn – drums, percussion (on "The Noah Plan")
- Curt Cress – drums, percussion (on "Major Tom")

=== Production ===
- Produced by Peter Schilling and Armin Sabol
- Recorded and engineered by Frank Reinke, Geoff Peacy, Lars Hidde, Manfred Lohse, Peter Schilling and Peter Schmidt
- Track 5 mixed by Holger J. Magnussen; all other tracks mixed by Frank Reinke
- Art direction – Bob Defrin
- Front cover photo – Gesine Petter
- Back cover photo – Job Crogier

== Charts ==
Chart performance for Fehler im System
| Chart (1983) | Peak position |
|---|---|
| Austrian Albums (Ö3 Austria) | 4 |
| Canada Top Albums/CDs (RPM) | 33 |
| Dutch Albums (Album Top 100) | 28 |
| German Albums (Offizielle Top 100) | 2 |

== Certifications ==
Certifications for Fehler im System
| Region | Certification | Certified units/sales |
|---|---|---|
| Canada (Music Canada) | Gold | 50,000^{^} |
| Germany (BVMI) | Gold | 250,000^{‡} |
^{‡} Sales+streaming figures based on certification alone.
