= Major Tom (Coming Home) =

Single by Peter Schilling

from the album Error in the System
- Language: English; German
- B-side: "Major Tom (Völlig Losgelöst)" (NA); "The Noah Plan" (UK)
- Released: 24 March 1983
- Recorded: 1982
- Genre: New wave; synth-pop
- Length: 4:33 (German edit); 3:58 (US 7” edit); 5:00 (English version); 8:02 (extended version)
- Label: Elektra; WEA
- Songwriter: Peter Schilling
- Producers: Armin Sabol; Peter Schilling

Peter Schilling singles chronology
"Fehler Im System" (1982)	"Major Tom (Coming Home)" (1983)	"Terra Titanic" (1984)

Music video
- "Major Tom (Coming Home)" on YouTube

"Major Tom (Coming Home)" (German: Major Tom [völlig losgelöst], lit. 'Major Tom [completely detached]') is a new wave song written and recorded by West German singer-songwriter Peter Schilling. Its German Version was released in Europe in November 1982 and in the USA in September 1983 in English as the lead single from his album Error in the System. Featuring the story of a character unofficially related to "Major Tom" (an astronaut depicted in British musician David Bowie's 1969 song "Space Oddity" and other releases), Schilling's track describes a protagonist who leaves Earth and begins drifting out into outer space as radio contact breaks off with his ground control team. His fate is left ambiguous as the song ends.

The song is one of multiple singles by various artists with a pop music related style influenced by the cultural roboticism associated with Berlin, Germany. It is specifically a part of the "Neue Deutsche Welle" (NDW), a social movement in the arts within German society, and is one of its pieces that crossed over into the popular culture of other nations. Versions in both the English language and in Schilling's native German have earned critical and commercial acclaim over multiple decades.

== Background ==
The song describes a calm, reflective astronaut known as Major Tom who is detached from the psychological stress of his colleagues and spends a significant amount of time engaging in certain scientific experiments about which he feels uncertain. An emotional insight breaks through his senses while he happily experiences weightlessness. The protagonist then meets his ambiguous fate after losing radio contact with other human beings. One line describes the Major as realizing that "mich führt hier ein Licht durch das All" (or "a light now guides me through space"). He leaves Earth and begins drifting out into outer space. The English version ends with the line "coming home" followed by repeating the chorus "home," while the German lyrics ends with the chorus repeating "los" (loosely, "go" or "away").

== Chart performance ==
The song was originally recorded in the German language and released in West Germany on 3 January 1983. It reached No. 1 in West Germany as well as in both Austria and Switzerland. The English version was first released in the United States on 24 September 1983. This version reached No. 1 in Canada, No. 4 in South Africa and peaked at No. 14 on the US Billboard Hot 100 chart the week of 24 December 1983. The English-language version of the song also reached No. 2 on the US Dance chart.

== Reception ==
In retrospect, journalist Gavin Edwards of The New York Times has stated that "Major Tom" became a key part of "a brief-lived flowering of Kraut-pop in the [United] States" during the late 1970s and early 1980s. Schilling's work proved to be "a hit in its English-language version" alongside other commercial "successes". Those include Trio's "Da Da Da" and After the Fire's "Der Kommissar" (which was a cover of a release by Falco), with Nena's "99 Luftballons" crossing over the Atlantic Ocean to commercial praise even in an untranslated version.

== Other versions ==
In 1994, Schilling released a remixed version along with Boom-Bastic, titled "Major Tom 94". Other remixes were released in 2000, titled "Major Tom 2000", and in 2003, titled "Major Tom 2003".

== Charts ==
Chart (1983–1984)	Peak position
Australia (Kent Music Report)	57
Austria (Ö3 Austria Top 40)	1
Belgium (Ultratop 50 Flanders)	3
Bolivian Chart	1
Canada (The Record)	1
Canada Top Singles (RPM)	1
France (SNEP)	2
Germany (GfK)	1
Ireland (IRMA)	22
Netherlands (Dutch Top 40)	4
Netherlands (Single Top 100)	2
New Zealand (Recorded Music NZ)	13
Switzerland (Schweizer Hitparade)	1
UK Singles (Official Charts Company)	42
US Billboard Hot 100	14
US Billboard Dance/Disco Top 80	2
U.S. Cash Box Top 100	10

Year-end chart (1983)	Rank
Austrian Singles Chart	13
Belgian Singles Chart	43
Dutch Singles Chart	22
German Singles Chart	1
Swiss Singles Chart	4

Year-end chart (1984)	Rank
Canada Top Singles (RPM)	33
US Top Pop Singles (Billboard)	96
American Top 40 Top 100 songs of 1984	97

== Certifications ==
Certifications for "Major Tom"
Region	Certification	Certified units/sales
Canada (Music Canada)	Gold	50,000^{^}
Germany (BVMI)	2× Platinum	1,000,000^{‡}
^{^} Shipments figures based on certification alone.^{‡} Sales+streaming figures based on certification alone.

== Cover versions ==
- Plastic Bertrand released a French language cover of the song in 1983 from the album Chat va?...Et toi?.
- English singer-songwriter Jonathan King released a mashup of "Major Tom (Coming Home)" together with David Bowie's "Space Oddity" titled "Space Oddity / Major Tom (Coming Home)". This release reached No. 77 on the UK Singles Chart in May 1984.
- A cover version by Shiny Toy Guns, was released in 2009; an advertising commercial for the Lincoln MKZ, featured this cover.
- American hard rock band Heaven Below released a cover in 2009 on their debut album Countdown to Devil and included a live recording on its companion album Reworking the Devil that same year.
- Actor William Shatner released a cover in 2011 on the space-themed album Seeking Major Tom.
- Apoptygma Berzerk released an EP in 2013 titled Major Tom that contains a cover and several remixes.
- The outsider artist The Space Lady also covered the song on the 2013 release "Major Tom/Radar Love".
- American Comedy Rock band The Consortium of Genius performed a cover live in 2014 and was included in their 2015 cover album, Strange Transmissions from Uranus.
- In 2016, Jay Del Alma released a Spanish-language remake titled "Vuela (Major Tom)" with Schilling on vocals.
- Another remix was published in 2020 by Spinnin' Records alongside Austrian DJ LUM!X and German DJ duo Hyperclap.
- Ava Max interpolated the chorus melody in the chorus of her 2020 song "Born to the Night".

== In popular media ==
- The song was used as theme song for the international distribution of the TV series Deutschland 83, as well as the sequel series Deutschland 86 and Deutschland 89.
- An instrumental version of the song was used during the 1980s as the introduction music of the San Diego Sockers (1978-1996).
- The song was used in AMC's Breaking Bad, in a scene where Hank Schrader, Walter White, and Walter Jr. watch a video of the drug chemist Gale Boetticher singing the song at a karaoke bar on a vacation to Thailand.
- In season 2, episode 5 of the Netflix original series The Umbrella Academy, the song was used when Pogo, the chimpanzee character on the show, was traveling into outer space and back to earth.
- The song was used in the car escape scene in Atomic Blonde (2017) when Lorraine Broughton (Charlize Theron) fights off would be assailants inside an Audi V8 D1 Typ 4C after arriving in Berlin.
- The song was used in the fourth season of the show The Americans.
- The German version was used in the series The Blacklist Season 2 Episode 14 T Earl King VI.
- The song appears in episode four of the web series The Gay and Wondrous Life of Caleb Gallo, in which the character Freckle recounts a humorous story about seducing two skateboarders and performing a Cameron Diaz monologue.
- The song was used as part of supposed communication with aliens in Season 1 of Invasion, an original series by Apple.
- The English version was used in season 1, episode 2 of the 2023 Netflix original series Wrestlers
- A cover in the fictional Huttese language was created for a trailer for Star Wars: Skeleton Crew. A full-length version titled "Youngee Wim (Bunky Dunko)" was released on December 4, 2024, featuring vocals by the show's sound designer David W. Collins and supervising sound editor Matthew Wood.
- In January 2025, a new cover version of the song produced by Koi Music in Berlin was used as background music for an internationally broadcast TV commercial for the Peugeot e-5008.
- The song has been used by various German national sport teams. Most notably, the song served as the goal song for the German national football team at the UEFA Euro 2024 and 2026 FIFA World Cup and the German men's and women's national ice hockey teams at the 2026 Winter Olympics and recent IIHF tournaments.
  - During the UEFA Championship in the summer 2024, the song was played after each German victory and the original version of "Major Tom" re-entered the top ten of the German singles chart after more than 40 years. Schilling stated publicly that he felt emotionally overwhelmed by the support and praised his fans.

== See also ==
- Human spaceflight
- Neue Deutsche Welle
- New wave music
- "Space Oddity"
- Synthpop
