= Rowboat Film- und Fernsehproduktion =

German film production company

- Type: Gesellschaft mit beschränkter Haftung (Germany) GmbH
- Industry: Film industry
- Founded: 2010
- Founder: Sam Davis; Jan Mojto
- Headquarters: Cologne, Germany
- Website: www.rowboat.tv

Rowboat Film- und Fernsehproduktion is a German film production company based in Cologne.

== History ==
Rowboat Film- und Fernsehproduktion GmbH was co-founded in January 2010 by film producer Sam Davis and Jan Mojto's international film distribution company Beta Film.

The company's first movie A Day for a Miracle (Das Wunder von Kärnten) had its première at the Filmfest Hamburg in 2011 and was nominated for the festival's TV producer award. Its TV première on Austria's ORF had more than one million viewers, relating to a market share of 33 percent. German public broadcaster ZDF showed the film on March 5, 2012. Since then Rowboat has produced Murder by the Lake and Professor T.

== Filmography ==
- A Day for a Miracle, 2011 (Director: Andreas Prochaska)
- Summer in Alsace, 2012 (Director: Michael Keusch)
- The End of Lies (German: Am Ende der Lüge), 2013 (Director: Marcus O. Rosenmüller)
- Summer in Portugal, 2013 (Director: Michael Keusch)
- On the Road with Elsa, 2014 (Director: Bettina Woernle)
- The Homecoming, 2014 (Director: Olaf Kreinsen)
- Murder by the Lake - The celtic Mystery, 2014 (Director: Andreas Linke)
- The cold Truth, 2015 (Director: Franziska Meletzky)
- Murder by the Lake 2 - Family Issues, 2015 (Director: Andreas Linke)
- Trust me, 2016 (Director: Franziska Meletzky)
- Because I love you ..., 2016 (Director: Christina Schiewe)
- Murder by the Lake 3 - The Sleepwalker, 2016 (Director: Andreas Linke)
- Murder by the Lake 4 - Till Death do them part, 2017 (Director: Hannu Salonen)
- Professor T. (series) Season 1, 2017 (Director: Thomas Jahn)
- Wedding in Rome, 2017 (Director: Olaf Kreinsen)
- Murder by the Lake 5 - The Girl who loved to laugh, 2017 (Director: Hannu Salonen)
- Murder by the Lake 6 - The Return, 2018 (Director: Hannu Salonen)
- Professor T. (series) Season 2, 2018 (Director: Thomas Jahn)
- Murder by the Lake 7 - The fourth Woman, 2018 (Director: Hannu Salonen)
- Murder by the Lake 8 - Death in the Forest (Director: Michael Schneider)
- Murder by the Lake 9 - Mermaid (Director: Michael Schneider)
- Professor T. (series) Season 3, Postproduction (Director: Thomas Jahn)
- Skin and Bones, 2019 (Director: Christina Schiewe)
- Murder by the Lake 10 - Curse from the Depth, 2020 (Director: Michael Schneider)
- Murder by the Lake 11 - Blood Procession, 2020 (Director: Michael Schneider)
- Murder by the Lake 12 - Haunted, 2020 (Director: Michael Schneider)
- Murder by the Lake 13 - Soul Circel, 2021 (Director: Michael Schneider)
- Take me Home, 2021 (Director: Christiane Balthasar)
- Murder Squared, 2021 (Director: Michael Schneider)
- Faster than Fear (series), 2022 (Director: Florian Baxmeyer)
- Murder by the Lake 14 - The Second Face, 2022 (Director: Christian Theede)
- Jeanny - The Fifth Girl, 2022 (Director: Andreas Kopriva)
- Murder by the Lake 15 - Among Wolves (Director: Christian Theede)
- Murder by the Lake 16 - Nemesis (Director: Michael Schneider)
- Murder by the Lake 17 - The Night Demon (Director: Michael Schneider)
- Murder by the Lake 18 - Breathless (Director: Michael Schneider)
- Murder by the Lake 19 - The Messiah (Director: Michael Schneider)
- Murder by the Lake 20 - Mystery of the Mansion (Director: Michael Schneider)
- The Riot Act (Director: Nicolai Rohde)
- Murder by the Lake 21 - The Medusa (Director: Patricia Frey)
- Murder by the Lake 22 - The Ghost Ship (Director: Patricia Frey)
- Murder by the Lake 23 - The Wishing Tree (Director: Michael Schneider)
- Murder by the Lake 24 - Wheel of Fate (Director: Patricia Frey)
- Murder by the Lake 25 - Shadow World (Director: Michael Schneider)
- Murder by the Lake 26 - Heaven's Child (Director: Michael Schneider)

== Awards ==
A Day for a Miracle was awarded two Austrian TV awards Romy in 2012, for "Best TV screenplay" (by Thorsten Wettcke and Christoph Silber) and "Best TV Producer" (Sam Davis, Rowboat and co-producer Klaus Graf of Graf Film, Austria), director Andreas Prochaska won the Bavarian TV Award for "Best Directing TV Movie" in 2012. On November 25, 2013, the film was awarded an International Emmy Award 2013 in the category "TV Movie/Mini-Series".

The ZDF TV Movie Take me Home won in the category "Best TV-Movie" at the Seoul International Drama Awards 2022.
