= Sam Davis (producer) =

German-American film producer

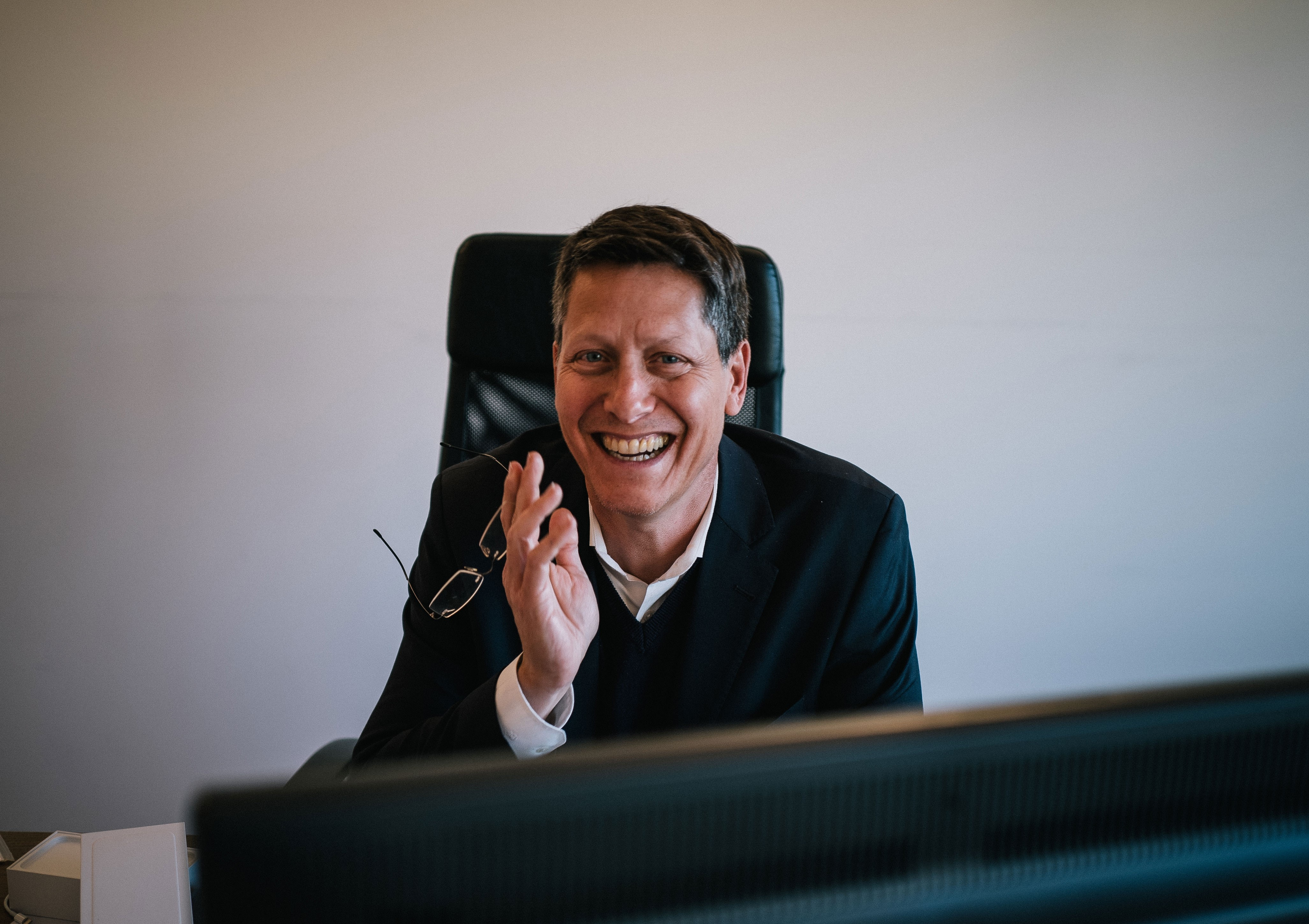

Sam Davis (born 1964 in New York City, New York) is a German-American film producer. He is the founder of Germany-based production company Rowboat Film- und Fernsehproduktion, and lives and works in Cologne.

== Life ==
Davis is a graduate in business of the University of Southern California and studied German at UCLA. After working at 20th Century Fox, he founded his own company Insight Out Films. In 1992, Davis moved to Frankfurt (Germany), where he wrote and directed the documentary Warum wir hier sind (Why we're here) for the BBC and WDR. From 1993 until 1998, he was head of the TV Movie Department at RTL Television in Cologne. During this time, he was responsible for the development and production of approximately 100 TV movies and miniseries. He introduced Germany to the made-for-TV movie.

In 1998, Davis became a partner and Co-CEO of Cologne-based production company Zeitsprung. He produced event productions, TV movies and series.

From 2004 until 2009, Davis took charge of the German Fiction department of Endemol Germany where he was responsible for TV movie and series productions Liebe ohne Rückfahrschein, Mr. Nanny – Ein Mann für Mama and the two-part London, Liebe, Taubenschlag.

In January 2010, Davis co-founded and became CEO of Rowboat Film- und Fernsehproduktion. Rowboat's first TV movie A Day for a Miracle premiered at the Hamburg Film Festival in 2011. In 2012 Davis won the ROMY prize in Austria for Best Producer for A Day for a Miracle. At the International Emmy Award 2013 A Day for a Miracle won in the category TV Movie/Mini-Series. Since then Davis has produced Murder by the Lake and Professor T. and Faster Than Fear.

Davis is married and has four children.

== Awards and nominations ==
- 2012: ROMY, Best TV Producer for A Day for a Miracle At the International Emmy Award 2013 A Day for a Miracle won in the category TV Movie/Mini-Series.
- 2013: International Emmy Award, Best TV Movie/Miniseries for A Day for a Miracle
- 2022: German Television Award, Nominated for Best Miniseries for Faster than Fear
- 2022: Seoul International Drama Awards, Best TV Movie for Take me Home

== Filmography ==
- 1993: Tödliche Lüge (dir. Ate de Jong)
- 1993: Das Schicksal der Lilian H. (dir. Marijan David Vajda, based on a novel by Marie Louise Fischer)
- 1994: Eine Mutter kämpft um ihren Sohn (dir. Károly Makk)
- 1994: Weihnachten mit Willy Wuff (dir. Maria Theresia Wagner)
- 1994: Judgment Day (dir. Peter Keglevic)
- 1994: Das Baby der schwangeren Toten (dir. Wolfgang Mühlbauer)
- 1994: Das ist dein Ende (dir. Michael Keusch)
- 1994: Blut an der Wiege (dir. Markus Fischer)
- 1995: Tödliches Leben (dir. Richard Engel)
- 1995: Der Räuber mit der sanften Hand (dir. Wolfgang Mühlbauer), TV miniseries
- 1995: Mörderische Zwillinge (dir. Dominique Othenin-Girard)
- 1995: Mit verbundenen Augen (dir. Marijan David Vajda)
- 1995: Alle lieben Willy Wuff (dir. Maria Theresia Wagner)
- 1995: 5 Stunden Angst – Geiselnahme im Kindergarten (dir. Peter Keglevic)
- 1995–1996: Die Flughafenklinik (dir. Niki Stein, Thomas Freundner), TV series, 8 episodes
- 1996: Anwalt Martin Berg: Mord im Klinikum (dir. Detlef Rönfeldt)
- 1996: Zwei Leben hat die Liebe (dir. Peter Timm)
- 1996: The Venus Killer (dir. Dominique Othenin-Girard)
- 1996: Die Stimme des Mörders (dir. Otto Alexander Jahrreiss)
- 1996: Der Parkhausmörder (dir. Michael Keusch)
- 1996: You Are Not Alone: The Roy Black Story (dir. Peter Keglevic)
- 1996: Adrenalin (dir. Dominique Othenin-Girard)
- 1996: Sünde einer Nacht (dir. Michael Keusch)
- 1997: Child Murder (dir. Bernd Böhlich)
- 1997: Delayed Exposure (dir. Nikolai Müllerschön)
- 1997: Sexy Lissy (dir. Peter Ily Huemer)
- 1997: Bus 152 (dir. Richard Huber)
- 1997: Die Sexfalle (dir. Michael Keusch)
- 1997: Kalte Küsse (dir. Carl Schenkel)
- 1997: Geisterstunde – Fahrstuhl ins Jenseits (dir. Rainer Matsutani, Sebastian Niemann)
- 1997: Blutige Scheidung – Mein Mann läuft Amok (dir. Manuel Siebenmann)
- 1997: Der stille Herr Genardy (dir. Carlo Rola)
- 1997: Code Red (dir. Carlo Rola)
- 1997: Anwalt Martin Berg: Tod eines Lehrers (dir. Thomas Jauch)
- 1997: Anwalt Martin Berg: Mörderischer Wohnen (dir. Marijan David Vajda, Helmuth Lohner)
- 1997: Anwalt Martin Berg: Ein sauberer Mord (dir. Gert Steinheimer)
- 1998: Ferkel Fritz (dir. Peter Timm)
- 1998: Nina – Vom Kinderzimmer ins Bordell (dir. Torsten C. Fischer)
- 1998: The Hairdresser and the Millionaire (dir. Ulli Baumann)
- 1998: Girl's Trap – Death Comes Online (dir. Peter Ily Huemer)
- 1998: Vicky's Nightmare (dir. Peter Keglevic)
- 1998: Silvias Bauch – Zwei Männer und (k)ein Baby (dir. Hugo Egon Balder)
- 1998: Liebe mich bis in den Tod (dir. Michael Keusch)
- 1998: Höllische Nachbarn (dir. Maria Theresia Wagner)
- 1998: Herzbeben – Die Nacht, die alles änderte (dir. Thomas Jahn)
- 1998: Die heilige Hure (dir. Dominique Othenin-Girard)
- 1998: Gigolo – Bei Anruf Liebe (dir. Michael Rowitz)
- 1998: Du hast mir meine Familie geraubt (dir. Wolfgang Mühlbauer)
- 1998: Zerschmetterte Träume – Eine Liebe in Fesseln (dir. Johannes Fabrick)
- 1998: Das Miststück (dir. Carlo Rola)
- 1999: Die Liebesdienerin (dir. Maris Pfeiffer)
- 1999: Das verflixte Babyjahr – Nie wieder Sex? (dir. Markus Bräutigam)
- 1999: The Beast in the Lake (dir. Richard Huber)
- 1999: Sieben Tage bis zum Glück (dir. Peter Ily Huemer)
- 1999: My Wife Loves Two (dir. Michael Keusch)
- 1999: Florian – Liebe aus ganzem Herzen (dir. Dominique Othenin-Girard)
- 1999: The Call Girl (dir. Peter Keglevic)
- 1999: Die Singlefalle – Liebesspiele bis in den Tod (dir. Michael Keusch)
- 1999: Paul und Clara – Liebe vergeht nie (dir. Nikolai Müllerschön)
- 2000: Liebe pur (dir. Florian Richter)
- 2000: Anna H. – Geliebte, Ehefrau und Hure (dir. Michael Keusch)
- 2000: Laila – Unsterblich verliebt (dir. Peter Ily Huemer)
- 2000–2001: Victor – Der Schutzengel, TV series, 11 episodes
- 2001: Mircomania, TV series, 13 episodes
- 2001: Die Frau, die Freundin und der Vergewaltiger (dir. Michael Keusch)
- 2001: Die heimlichen Blicke des Mörders (dir. Michael Keusch)
- 2001: Kleiner Mann sucht großes Herz (dir. Heidi Kranz)
- 2002: Todeslust (dir. Michael Keusch)
- 2002: Pest – Die Rückkehr (dir. Niki Stein)
- 2002: Zwei Affären und eine Hochzeit (dir. Michael Keusch)
- 2002: Flitterwochen im Treppenhaus (dir. Markus Bräutigam)
- 2003: Traumprinz in Farbe (dir. Oliver Dommenget)
- 2003: A Light in Dark Places (dir. Kaspar Heidelbach)
- 2003: Krista (dir. Ulli Baumann), TV series, 7 episodes
- 2004: Liebe ohne Rückfahrschein (dir. Oliver Dommenget)
- 2005: Brautpaar auf Probe (dir. Ben Verbong)
- 2005: Ein Hund, zwei Koffer und die ganz große Liebe (dir. Oliver Dommenget)
- 2005: Princess Undercover (dir. Franziska Meyer Price)
- 2006: Opposites Attract (dir. Oliver Dommenget)
- 2006: Mr. Nanny – Ein Mann für Mama (dir. Oliver Dommenget)
- 2006: Zwei Bräute und eine Affäre (dir. Christoph Klünker)
- 2007: Ideal Son-In-Law (dir. Michael Rowitz)
- 2008: Maja (dir. Granz Henman), TV series, 10 episodes
- 2008: Kleine Lüge für die Liebe (dir. Dennis Satin)
- 2008: Vier Tage Toskana (dir. Michael Keusch)
- 2008: Zoogeflüster – Komm mir nicht ins Gehege! (dir. Dennis Satin)
- 2009: 40+ sucht neue Liebe (dir. Andi Niessner)
- 2010: London, Liebe, Taubenschlag (dir. Michael Keusch)
- 2011: A Day for a Miracle (dir. Andreas Prochaska)
- 2011: Summer in Alsace (dir. Michael Keusch)
- 2012: The End of Lies (dir. Marcus O. Rosenmüller)
- 2014: On the Road with Elsa (dir. Bettina Woernle)
- 2013: Summer in Portugal (dir. Michael Keusch)
- 2013: The Homecoming (Director: Olaf Kreinsen)
- since 2013: Murder by the Lake (24 movies broadcastet, multiple directors)
- 2014: The Cold Truth (Director: Franziska Meletzky)
- 2015: Trust me (Director: Franziska Meletzky)
- 2015: Because I Love You ... (Director: Christina Schiewe)
- 2016-2019: Professor T (series) (Director: Thomas Jahn)
- 2016: Wedding in Rome (Director: Olaf Kreinsen)
- 2019: Skin and Bones (Director: Christina Schiewe)
- 2020: Take me Home (Director: Christiane Balthasar)
- 2021: Murder Squared (Director: Michael Schneider)
- 2021: Faster than Fear (Director: Florian Baxmeyer)
- 2022: Jeanny - the fifth Girl (Director: Andreas Kopriva)
- 2024: The Riot Act (Director: Nicolai Rohde)

== Publications ==
In 2000, Davis book' Quotenfieber - Das Geheimnis erfolgreicher TV-Movies was published. In this book, he writes about the German television broadcasting business, how fictional TV-movies are made, what functions they have and the importance of ratings.
