= A Day for a Miracle =

- Film poster
- German: Das Wunder von Kärnten
- Directed by: Andreas Prochaska
- Screenplay by: Christoph Silber, Thorsten Wettcke
- Produced by: Sam Davis, Rowboat Film- und Fernsehproduktion; Klaus Graf, Graf Film
- Starring: Ken Duken; Julia Koschitz; Juergen Maurer; Gerti Drassl; Gerhard Liebmann; Sara Wogatai; Bernhard Schir; Erwin Steinhauer
- Cinematography: Thomas Kienast
- Edited by: Daniel Prochaska
- Music by: Matthias Weber
- Release date: October 2011 (Hamburg)
- Running time: 89 minutes
- Countries: Germany, Austria
- Language: German

A Day for a Miracle (German: Das Wunder von Kärnten, lit. 'The wonder of Carinthia') is a 2011 film directed by Andreas Prochaska in 2011 and produced by Rowboat Film- und Fernsehproduktion and Graf Film for public German TV channel ZDF and Austrian ORF. The film is based on real events, telling the story of a three-year-old girl from Austria, who fell into the lake behind her parents' house in 1998, and had been under water for 30 minutes when she was found. Nobody believed she had a chance at survival when the young cardiovascular surgeon Dr. Markus Thalmann takes up the seemingly hopeless fight for the young girl's life. His rescue has written medical history. The screenplay was written by Christoph Silber and Thorsten Wettcke.

The film premiered at the 2011 Filmfest Hamburg, and later showed in television in Germany and Austria.

== Plot ==
Dr. Markus Höchstmann, a young and ambitious cardiovascular surgeon and ultra marathon runner from Vienna, has landed his first job in a clinic in Klagenfurt, province of Carinthia. As his wife and son are still living in Vienna, he needs to commute to the capital every chance he gets to see them. His colleagues have little sympathy for him when he is asked to fill in for the chief of surgery on the weekend of his son's birthday to perform a standard procedure on an important local politician. This is when an emergency is flown in: a four-year-old girl has drowned, her body is lifeless and cold, her heart is not beating. After 30 minutes under water, the damage to her brain is considered too extensive to try to resuscitate her. Höchstmann disagrees. Against the opinions of his more experienced colleagues and against all odds, he decides to fight for the little girl's life and performs a medical miracle.

== Awards ==
=== Wins ===
- International Emmy Award 2013, in the category: TV Movie/Mini-Series.
- The film won two Austrian TV awards Romy in 2012, for "Best TV screenplay" (by Christoph Silber and Thorsten Wettcke) and "Best TV Producer" (Sam Davis, Rowboat and co-producer Klaus Graf of Graf Film, Austria)
- Director Andreas Prochaska won the Bavarian TV Award for "Best Directing TV Movie" in 2012.
- Gerti Drassl won the German Actors Award 2013 (Deutscher Schauspielerpreis) in the category "Best Actress in a Supporting Role"
- Günter-Rohrbach-Filmpreis 2012 for supporting actors Gerti Drassl and Gerhard Liebmann

=== Nominations ===
- Nominated for Prix Europa 2012
- Nominated for Grimme-Preis 2013, category "Fiction"
- Nomination in the category "Best Director TV", "Regiepreis Metropolis" for Andreas Prochaska
