= Christoph Silber =

German-American author and filmmaker

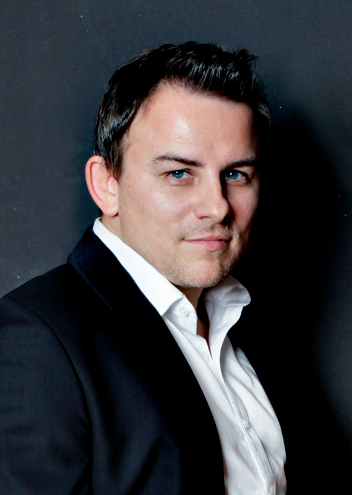
- Born: 26 April 1975 (age 51); Berlin, Germany
- Occupations: Author and filmmaker

Christoph Silber (born 26 April 1975, in Berlin) often credited as Chris Silber, is a German-American author, filmmaker and performer. Silber works and lives in the United States.

== Early life ==
Silber spent most of his childhood and youth in Germany. Raised bilingual, he studied in London and Berlin. His mother Christa Schuenke is a philosopher and literary translator; his foster father Maik Hamburger was a Shakespeare scholar and dramaturge.

== Career ==
In 1995 the Vienna Burgtheater asked him to adapt Puccini's Tosca for a stage production.

Silber's screenwriting career began in European television in the mid-1990s. Silber worked as a writer of sitcoms as well as crime series. Silber has collaborated on numerous films, including the award-winning Good Bye, Lenin!, North Face, Arranged and My Last Day Without You, for which he also co-wrote several songs performed by Nicole Beharie. He also wrote scripts for the Enid Blyton-based Hanni & Nanni franchise. Several of his contributions to German television like Tatort "Schwanensee" have broken ratings records.

Based in Los Angeles since 2012, Silber has been honoured by the Vilcek Foundation as "an immigrant filmmaker...whose creative spirit enlivens and inspires American cinema."

In 2019, Silber sold a WWII series pilot inspired by his grandfather's story to Hollywood-based Blitz Films. In 2023, Sam: A Saxon, a mini-series co-created and head-written by Silber, was released by Disney+ worldwide and by Hulu in the United States.

== Personal life ==
Silbers former wife Joleita, who inspired his film My Last Day Without You, died from cancer in 2013. He reflected on his family's grief journey in his children's book The Cloud In Our House (Die Wolke Unterm Dach), which was released in Germany in 2022.

== Filmography ==
=== Theatrical ===
- 2022: Cloud In The Attic (writer, story)
- 2017: I'm Off Then (writer)
- 2015: The Trapp Family – A Life Of Music (writer)
- 2015: Azure (short; director, producer)
- 2013: Banklady (writer)
- 2013: Hanni & Nanni 3 (writer)
- 2012: Hanni & Nanni 2 (writer)
- 2011: My Last Day Without You (writer, producer)
- 2010: Devil's Kickers (writer)
- 2010: The Albanian (writer)
- 2010: Young Goethe in Love (script consultant)
- 2008: My Mother's Tears (writer)
- 2008: North Face (writer)
- 2007: Arranged (script consultant)
- 2007: Mrs. Ratcliffe's Revolution (script consultant)
- 2006: Ice Wind (short; writer, director, actor)
- 2004: The Ring Thing (writer, producer)
- 2003: Good Bye, Lenin! (collaborator on screenplay)
- 2001: Julietta (writer)
- 2001: Brooklyn Bridge (short; writer)

=== Television ===
- 2024: Perfect Match (writer)
- 2023: The Gifted Family (writer)
- 2023: Sam: A Saxon (miniseries, co-creator & head writer)
- 2022: 5 Hours - The Miracle of Cape Town (writer)
- 2019: Walpurgis Night (miniseries, creator & writer)
- 2017: Balaton Residence (miniseries, co-creator & writer)
- 2016: Rivals Forever (miniseries, co-creator & writer)
- 2015: The New Girl (writer)
- 2014: Dresden Homicide (crime series; creator & head writer)
- 2012: A Day for a Miracle (writer)
- 2011: Girl on the Ocean Floor (writer)
- 2010: Love Is Just a Word (writer)
- 2006-today: Tatort (crime series; writer & head writer)
- 2006–2010: Der Kriminalist (crime series; writer & head writer)
- 2004: My Best Years (series; head writer)
- 2000: Trivial Pursuit (writer)

== Awards and nominations ==
=== Wins ===
- 2024 Grimme Award: Best TV Series Sam: A Saxon
- 2023 Clio Awards: Best Historic TV Series Sam: A Saxon
- 2022 Hamburg Film Festival: Best TV Film The Miracle of Cape Town
- 2016 Munich Film Festival: Best TV Film or Miniseries Rivals Forever
- 2016 Romy Award: Best TV Film Berlin One
- 2013 International Emmy: Best TV Film or Miniseries A Day for a Miracle
- 2012 Romy Award: Best Screenplay A Day for a Miracle
- 2012 Black Reel Awards: Best Independent Film My Last Day Without You
- 2012 Golden Sparrow Award: Best Children's Film Hanni & Nanni 2
- 2011 Brooklyn Film Festival: Best Producer My Last Day Without You
- 2011 Max Ophüls Award: Best Film The Albanian
- 2011 Hawaii International Film Festival: AIFP honoree, sponsored by the Vilcek Foundation
- 2009 German Film Critics Award: Best Screenplay North Face
- 2009 Grimme Award: Audience Award Tatort: Auf der Sonnenseite
- 2007 Brooklyn Film Festival: Best Film Arranged
- 2001 Brooklyn Film Festival: Best Film Julietta

=== Nominations ===
- 2016 Civis media prize: Best TV Film The New Girl
- 2013 Grimme Award: Best TV Film A Day for a Miracle
- 2013 Montblanc Screenplay Award: Banklady
- 2012 Black Reel Awards: Best Original Song My Last Day Without You
- 2009 Golden Camera: Best TV Film Tatort: Auf der Sonnenseite
