= Professor T. (German TV series) =

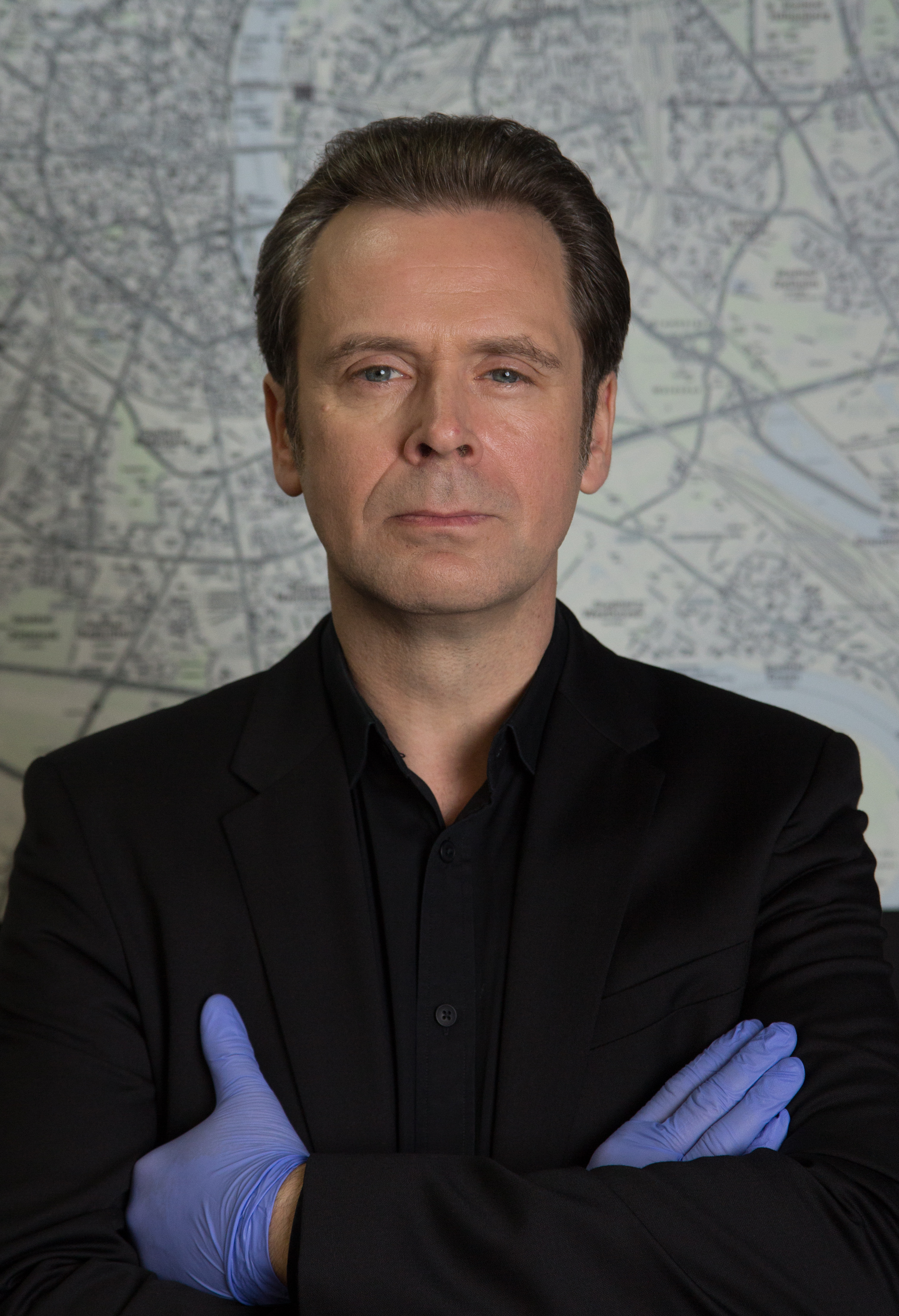
- Professor T. on November 3, 2017
- Genre: Crime drama Police procedural
- Directed by: Thomas Jahn
- Starring: Matthias Matschke; Lucie Heinze; Helgi Schmid; Julia Bremermann; Simon Böer; Paul Faßnacht; Hedi Kriegeskotte; Alexandra von Schwerin; Kristina Klebe
- Country of origin: Germany
- Original language: German
- No. of seasons: 4
- No. of episodes: 16

Production
- Executive producer: Sam Davis
- Running time: 60 minutes
- Production company: Rowboat Film- und Fernsehproduktion

Original release
- Network: ZDF
- Release: February 4, 2017 – June 5, 2020

Related
- Professor T. (Belgian TV series); Prof T. (French TV series); Professor T. (Czech TV series); Professor T. (British TV series)

Professor T. is a German TV crime-drama series set in Cologne about an eccentric professor at Cologne University, Jasper Thalheim, who is an advisor to the police. It is an adaptation from the Belgian TV series of the same name which has also a remake by the same name in France. There are four seasons with four episodes each, after which the series concluded. All episodes were aired on the German broadcasting channel ZDF.

== Premise ==
Professor Jasper Thalheim – known to his students as Professor T. – is an expert for psychological criminology at the University of Cologne. For that, he is admired as well as redoubtable. T has OCD: he wants everything to be in order and clean, wearing blue medical gloves most of the time. For his former student Anneliese Deckert and her colleague Daniel Winter – who both work for the criminal investigation department in Cologne – Professor T. is their only hope to solve almost unsolvable crimes.

But working with Professor T. is difficult because of his own minor psychological disorders. He innocently insults everybody around him, immediately identifies the weaknesses of a person, and his observations are annoyingly always right. But Anneliese and Daniel are unperturbed and build an unbeatable team with Professor T. Chief Commissioner Paul Rabe disapproves and feels left out. Christina Fehrmann, head of the criminal investigation department, considers T's collaboration with mixed feelings because she and T were once a couple.

== Episodes ==
=== Season 1 ===
No. overall	No. in season	Title	Directed by	Written by	Viewers Germany (million)	Original air date
1	1	"Die Rückkehr"	Thomas Jahn	Ben Braeunlich	5,11	February 4, 2017
After a student party at the campus, the student Diana is brutally raped. Unfortunately, she suffers from trauma and can't remember the perpetrator. Anneliese and her colleague Daniel are assigned with the investigations. Anneliese discovers parallels with a crime 10 years ago during her study period. At that time, her friend Saskia was raped at a party in the same way. Anneliese still feels guilty that she didn't accompany her friend on her way home back then. Because Anneliese and Daniel can't find a trace, Anneliese asks her former professor for criminalistics and criminal psychology, Professor T., for help. Anneliese has to do a lot of convincing to persuade T to help them. But the time is running out and soon the rapist finds another victim.
2	2	"Die Abrechnung"	Thomas Jahn	Ben Braeunlich; Georg Hartmann	4,68	February 11, 2017
Marc Leyendecker celebrates carnival until he receives a call from his wife Johanna and becomes a witness for her murder. When he arrives home, it is already too late. His wife suffocated painfully on her own blood after the murderer stabbed her multiple times. Anneliese and Daniel are assigned with the investigation and at a first look, everything seems like a holdup murder. But the brutality makes Anneliese doubt this. Anneliese and Daniel ask Professor T. - again - for help. Their boss Paul Rabe doesn't approve of this because he and T do not get along very well. The first trace leads Anneliese, Daniel, and T to a school, which had recently been inspected by Johanna Leyendecker, who worked as a superintendent for schools. Shortly before her death, Johanna discovered a violation of the supervisory duty of the trainer Karl Hennef. She wanted to start an official investigation. But is this enough to commit a murder?
3	3	"Mord im Hotel"	Thomas Jahn	Ben Braeunlich; Burkhardt Wunderlich	4,48	February 18, 2017
The plastic surgeon Hendrik Maas is found dead in his hotel room, naked and only covered by a bathrobe. He has been shot to death. It seems that Maas had a romantic visitor before his death, but the police can't find any traces from the visitor. Was Maas killed because of a failed plastic surgery? With the help of the commissionaire, Anneliese and Daniel find the married Jennifer Bell, who had a special agreement with Maas: sex in exchange for plastic surgery. But did her husband know about that? Anneliese would like to ask Professor T. for help, but Christina Fehrmann has forbidden T's collaboration until further notice. His revelation that Paul Rabe is an alcoholic hasn't yet been forgotten. But T doesn't follow any orders or rules - he has already started his own investigations.
4	4	"Tamara"	Thomas Jahn	Ben Braeunlich	4,55	February 25, 2017
Tamara, an escort, is found dead in the bathtub by her roommate. When sleeping pills are found at the crime scene, everything seems like a suicide - unimaginable for her friends. And for T, who was also a customer of Tamara - in a special way. The autopsy refutes the theory of suicide as well. Anneliese and Daniel ask T for an advice, without knowing that he knew Tamara personally. But soon T becomes a suspect himself - a satisfaction for Paul Rabe. Although T is left out of the investigation, he continues his collaboration. Tamara was too important for him to leave her death unsolved.

=== Season 2 ===
From September 11 till November 10 Season 2 has been shot in Cologne and its surroundings. In opposition to the first season, season two hasn't been broadcast on Saturdays at 9.45 pm but on Fridays at 8.15 pm.

No. overall	No. in season	Title	Directed by	Written by	Viewers Germany (million)	Original air date
5	1	"Maskenmord"	Thomas Jahn	Christoph Mathieu, Thomas Jahn	4,21	May 4, 2018
The murder of Mr. and Mrs. Krämer resemble a ritual murder 15 years ago. Back then, a suspect was convicted and institutionalized - thanks to Christina Fehrmann. But even until today, the alleged murderer asserts his innocence. With the new case, Christina's entire career is at stake. She asks Professor T. for help to find out whether or not the man was wrongly jailed 15 years ago.
6	2	"Das verlorene Kind"	Thomas Jahn	Sebastian Heeg	4,03	May 11, 2018
Max Thierse was beaten up in his own home and his son Tim is gone without a trace. Everything looks like a kidnapping and a race against time begins. T's interest is awoken when he learns that the lost child is autistic. While investigating the dark truth of the family, T discovers similarities to his own painful childhood.
7	3	"Blutlinie"	Thomas Jahn	Christoph Mathieu	3,69	May 18, 2018
The eccentric owner of a brewery is found hanged. Shortly before his murder he staged - with a lot of blood - his own death and disappeared. T finds out that his original plan was to take revenge on his family, who in his eyes are unthankful and greedy. But who crossed the plans and instead murdered the patriarch for real?
8	4	"Rache"	Thomas Jahn	Thomas Jahn, Christoph Mathieu	3,26	May 25, 2018
Chief Inspector Rabe is suspected to have murdered a woman and her lover. The woman was the wife of the man who killed Rabe's daughter in a car accident. All evidence is up against Rabe. Has he taken revenge on the crash driver? In his desperation, Rabe turns to T, the man he hates most, and asks him for help to prove his innocence.

=== Season 3 ===
No. overall	No. in season	Title	Directed by	Written by	Viewers Germany (million)	Original air date
9	1	"Der perfekte Mord"	Thomas Jahn	Thomas Jahn	3,8	March 8, 2019
Returning home from vacation, the Krüger family finds a body in their bathtub. The police have no clues until Professor T. receives a message from the killer and suspects that one of his students wants to take revenge on him. During the investigation, T is constantly distracted by his inner demons that haunt him more and more. Meanwhile, Anneliese and Daniel get to know their new boss Simon Zander.
10	2	"Hikikomori"	Thomas Jahn	Thomas Jahn	3,11	March 15, 2019
T is committed to a mental hospital against his will. He vegetates in a wheelchair and fights the Samurai demon in his head. Anneliese and Daniel need to solve the brutal murder of an insurance executive on their own. To Daniel's horror, his fiancée Debbie is suspected and taken into custody. T’s lawyer Christian Fröhlich begs Christina to visit T in the hospital to bring him out of his dreamland.
11	3	"Lügen"	Thomas Jahn	Thomas Jahn	3,26	March 22, 2019
A nuclear physics student drops dead in Professor T.'s office with acute radiation sickness. T knows right away that this is a murder, not an atomic accident. Privately, he deals with his past and the death of his father. He assumes that his mother is keeping something from him.
12	4	"Mörder"	Thomas Jahn	Thomas Jahn	3,14	March 29, 2019
Professor T. helps the police to solve the murder of a neo-Nazi. In return, he gets support from the forensic pathologist Nina Lehmann with his own investigation. After all these years, T can finally solve the mystery of the death of his father Birger Sander Thalheim. Anneliese starts spying on her boss Simon Zander ... with unexpected consequences.

=== Season 4 ===
No. overall	No. in season	Title	Directed by	Written by	Viewers Germany (million)	Original air date
13	1	"Die Zeugin"	Thomas Jahn	Thomas Jahn	TBA	May 15, 2020
A young woman is killed with a shotgun blast to the head. She appears to have been the star witness in the murder trial of drug boss Ezequiel Morales. But then Karoline Gerber, the real witness, shows up – her best friend Melanie was visiting the wrong place at the wrong time. Karoline needs protection, fast. Daniel jumps in, takes Karoline on a road trip and together they find a bearded and dirty (!) Professor T. in self-exile on the Belgian coast. Daniel convinces him to come home to help find Anneliese Deckert’s murderer with him.
14	2	"Mütter"	Thomas Jahn	Thomas Jahn	TBA	May 22, 2020
While T feels liberated by confronting the demons of his past, and starts making plans for a future with Christina, the corpse of gallerist Sophia Gruber is found at the city dump. T was at boarding school with the main suspect, her son Hans Gruber. At the time, they shared a dorm room and murder phantasies with regards to their mothers. While T never acted on them, did Hans actually do it?
15	3	"Mathilde Möhring"	Thomas Jahn	Thomas Jahn	TBA	May 29, 2020
The notorious boulevard journalist Kai Schilling published the true story behind T killing his father as a child. He dubs T the “murderer professor” on the front page and taunts him about whether he wants to murder again. When Schilling is himself found murdered in an alley, T finds himself on a long list of suspects. It appears, though, that someone wanted him dead more than T. In the meantime, T and Daniel Winter discover Simon Zander’s horrific secrets and start to close in on him for the murder of Anneliese Deckert.
16	4	"Christina"	Thomas Jahn	Thomas Jahn	TBA	June 5, 2020
Daniel Winter rushes to a hospital to find out that Christina has been seriously injured. T and the team immediately start their investigation: Who would have done this? T knows that for some time now Christina, besides her usual daily work, has been reinvestigating old, unsolved cases. Did Christina dig too deep and become a threat to someone? T is doing all he can to solve that crime and uncovers a terrifying secret that will connect them forever.

== Review ==
The German newspaper Frankfurter Allgemeine Zeitung wrote about the first season of Professor T., that Jasper Thalheim (Matthias Matschke) and Anneliese Deckert (Lucie Heinze) have the potential to become identification figures with humour for the ZDF like the successful investigators of the Tatort in Münster are for the ARD.

The German newspaper Neue Osnabrücker Zeitung praises the lead actor Matthias Matschke, because he succeeded in playing Professor T. as an arrogant dislikable guy with vulnerability and helplessness.

Frankfurter Neue Presse praises Matschke's acting, but criticises characterisation of the criminals.

== Awards and nominations ==
In 2017, leading Actor Matthias Matschke was nominated for Deutscher Comedypreis as Best Actor for his role Professor T. as well as for his performance in the comedy show Sketch History.
