= Sandra Speichert =

German actress (born 1971)

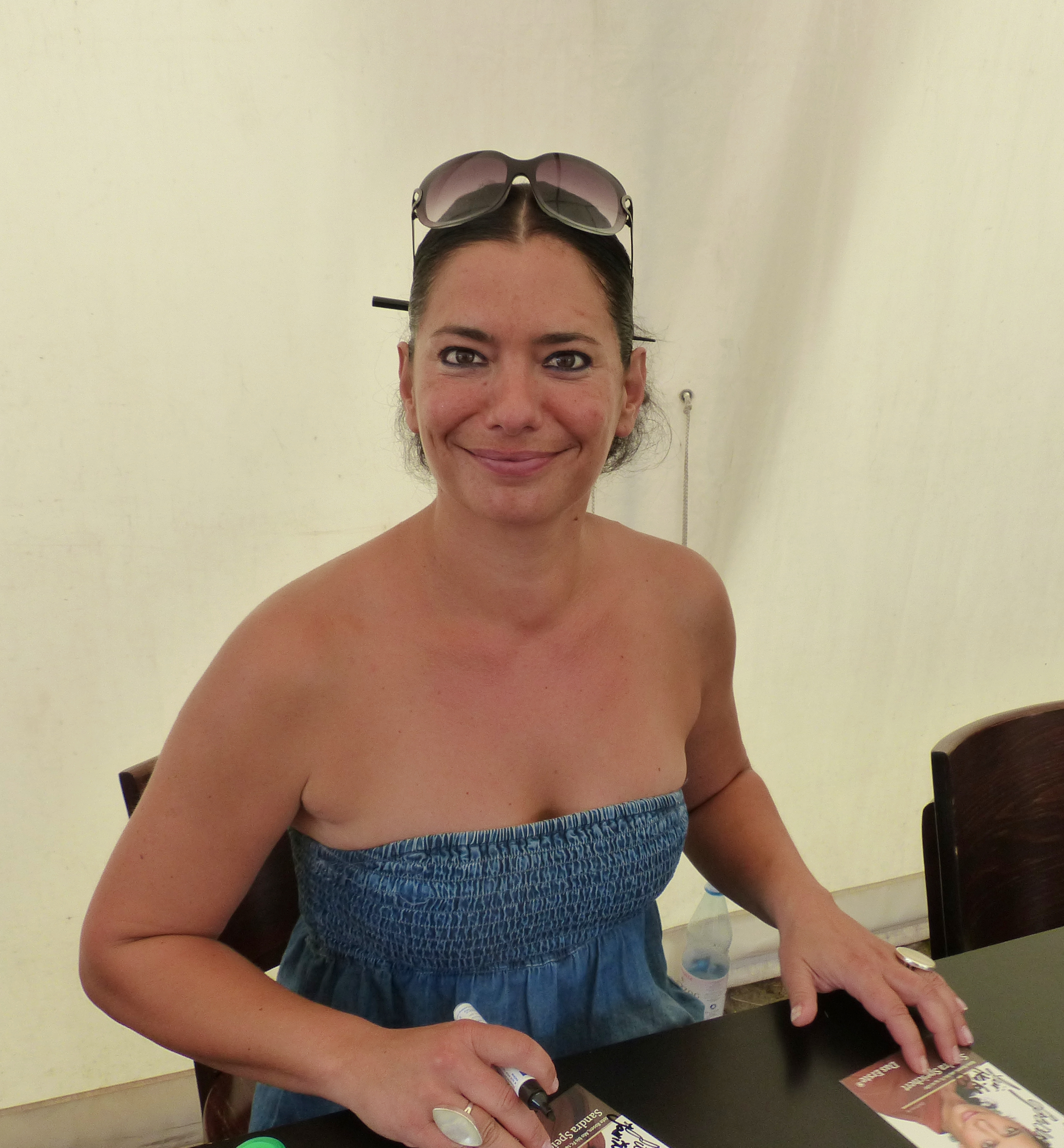
- Sandra Speichert (2013)
- Born: 22 January 1971 (age 55); Basel, Switzerland
- Occupation: Actress
- Years active: 1992-present

Sandra Speichert (born 22 January 1971) is a German actress. She performed in more than forty films since 1992, along with a number of theatrical performances.

== Selected filmography ==
Year	Title	Role	Director	Notes
1993	Profil bas	Claire	Claude Zidi	
1995	La Rivière Espérance	Virginie Duthil	Josée Dayan	TV miniseries
1995	Magic Girl	Jenny Rätis	Vivian Naefe	TV film
1996	Teenage Wolfpack	Sissy	Urs Egger	TV film
1997	Delayed Exposure	Karen Verhofen	Nikolai Müllerschön	TV film
1998	Der Campus	Babsi	Sönke Wortmann	
1998	Ms. Diamond	Lana	Michael Karen	TV film
1998	Der Kuss des Killers	Vera	Michael Rowitz	TV film
1998	Kai Rabe gegen die Vatikankiller	Maria Rall	Thomas Jahn	
1999	Die Singlefalle	Julia Hollander	Michael Keusch	TV film
2002	Deadly Rendezvous	Laura Witt	Wolf Gremm	TV film
2007	Mitten im Leben	Bea Richter	Christoph Schrewe	TV series
2008	Sous les vents de Neptune	Noëlla	Josée Dayan	TV film

== Awards ==
- Prix Romy Schneider, Paris, France (1994)
- United Cinemas International, Düsseldorf, Germany (1998)
