= Kai Rabe gegen die Vatikankiller =

1998 film

- Theatrical release poster
- Directed by: Thomas Jahn
- Written by: Thomas Jahn
- Produced by: Thomas Jahn; Michael Souvignier; Oliver Stoltz
- Starring: Steffen Wink; Klaus J. Behrendt; Sandra Speichert; Stefan Jürgens; Heinz Hoenig; Hannelore Elsner; Mirco Nontschew; Jan Josef Liefers
- Cinematography: Piotr Lenar
- Edited by: Andrea Mertens
- Music by: Tito Larriva
- Production companies: Dreamer Joint Venture Filmproduction; Warner Bros. Film
- Distributed by: Warner Bros. Film
- Release date: 26 November 1998
- Running time: 93 minutes
- Country: Germany
- Language: German

Kai Rabe gegen die Vatikankiller (Kai Rabe vs. the Vatican Killers) is a 1998 German comedy film directed by Thomas Jahn.

== Plot ==
Director Rufus Lindner is making a movie called "The Vatican Killers", a satirical film about the Pope's underground agents. The hero of the film is played by teen idol Kai Rabe. The production runs amok, starting with the murder of the leading actress. In addition, Kai Rabe rents two trigger-happy Israeli bodyguards. Lindner's other problems include a reckless producer who insists the film shoot go on, and a police officer investigating the murder who falls in love with a beautiful actress, who happens to be the playwright's sister.

== Cast ==
- Steffen Wink as Kai Rabe
- Klaus J. Behrendt as Bernd Krüger
- Sandra Speichert as Maria Rall
- Stefan Jürgens as Rufus Lindner
- Heinz Hoenig as Egon Lütter
- Hannelore Elsner as Hilde Strassburger
- Mirco Nontschew as Solomon
- Jan Josef Liefers as Marc Hohlmann
- Brion James as Monk
- Ercan Durmaz as Ezekiel
- Edgar Selge as Michael Walner
- Anna Loos as Esther
- Thierry Van Werveke
- Huub Stapel as Karl Bresser
- Dietmar Bär as Producer
- Bernd Michael Lade
- Markus Knüfken as Kurzte

== Production ==
Following Jahn's success with Knockin' on Heaven's Door, Warner Bros. signed him to a three-picture deal and rushed Kai Rabe gegen die Vatikankiller into production.

== Reception ==
The film performed badly at the box office and Warner Bros. cancelled Jahn's deal.
