= Lotte Vannieuwenborg =

Belgian actress

- Born: 7 April 1987 (age 38); Hofstade, Flanders, Belgium
- Occupation: Actor

Lotte Vannieuwenborg (Dutch: [ˈlɔtə vɑˈniu.ə(m)bɔr(ə)x]; born 7 April 1987) is a Belgian actress.

She is best known for her role as Katrien Snackaert in the VRT 1 soap opera Thuis (2008–2013, 2015, 2022). She also played Eva Vennens in the VTM soap opera Familie (2017, 2018, 2022–2024, 2025). She had guest roles in the TV series Goesting (2010), the Belgian adaptation of Danni Lowinski (2012), Professor T. (2015) and Vermist (2016) and appeared in season 1 of Gent-West (2017). She also mainly played in theatre productions.

Vannieuwenborg studied Drama at the Lemmensinstituut in Leuven, Belgium.

== Filmography ==
=== Television ===
Title	Role	Year	TV channel	Notes
Thuis	Katrien Snackaert	2008–2013, 2015, 2022	VRT 1	Episodes 2325–3292, 3749–3755, 5296–5340; Seasons 13–18, 20, 28
Goesting	Model	2010	VRT 1	Episode 3: Ferran
Danni Lowinski	/	2012	VTM	Season 1: Episode 6 (E6): Een blok aan het been
Professor T.	Saskia Devriese	2015	VRT 1	Season 1: Episode 1 (E1): Campus Drie Eiken
Vermist	Manager	2016	Play4	Season 7: Episode 7 (E67): Siska
Gent-West	Hannah	2017	Play Telenet/ Play4	Season 1: Episodes 2, 4–6, 10 (E2, 4–6, 10)
Familie	Eva Vennens	2017, 2018, 2022–2024, 2025	VTM	Episodes 5996–6036, 6037 (voice), 6200, 6210, 7090–7439 (7113 & 7429 voice), 7633 (voice), 7637 (voice), 7638 (voice); Season 27–28, 32–34

=== Shorts ===
Year	Title	Role
2010	Daijobu	Unnamed
2014	Nona	Nona
