= Professor T. (British TV series) =

British crime drama television series

- Genre: Crime drama
- Created by: Matt Baker; Malin-Sarah Gozin
- Based on: Professor T. by Paul Piedfort
- Directed by: Dries Vos
- Starring: Ben Miller; Emma Naomi; Barney White; Andy Gathergood; Sarah Woodward; Juliet Aubrey; Frances de la Tour
- Music by: Hannes De Maeyer
- Country of origin: United Kingdom
- Original language: English
- No. of series: 5
- No. of episodes: 30

Production
- Executive producers: Bert Hamelinck; Walter Iuzzolino; Jo McGrath
- Producer: Dimitri Verbeeck
- Production locations: Belgium and Cambridge, England, United Kingdom

Original release
- Network: ITV
- Release: 18 July 2021 – present

Related
- Professor T. (Belgian TV series); Professor T. (German TV series); Professor T. (Czech TV series); Prof T. (French TV series)

Professor T. is a British crime drama television series starring Ben Miller as Professor Jasper Tempest, a genius University of Cambridge criminologist with obsessive–compulsive disorder, Miller is joined by Emma Naomi, Barney White and Frances de la Tour. It is an adaptation from the Belgian TV series of the same name. It began broadcasting on Britbox on 3 June 2021, ITV on 18 July 2021, and PBS in the United States on 11 July 2021.

On 6 October 2021, it was announced that the programme had been renewed for a second series which premiered on 16 September 2022. In January 2023, it was renewed for a third series which premiered on 27 March 2024 and in February 2024 it was renewed for a fourth series. In February 2025 it was renewed for a fifth series. In December 2025, Belgian Director Dries Vos confirmed series 6 will be recorded in 2026.

== Premise ==
Professor Jasper Tempest, a genius criminologist at University of Cambridge, who has OCD and an overbearing mother, assists the police in solving crimes. Miller has stated in an interview that Jasper is also autistic.

== Cast ==
- Ben Miller as Professor Jasper Tempest
- Frances de la Tour as Adelaide Tempest (Main Series 1―3, Guest Series 4)
- Juliet Aubrey as DCI Christina Brand (Series 1―3)
- Sunetra Sarker as DCI Maiya Goswami (Series 3―)
- Emma Naomi as DS/DI Lisa Donckers (Main Series 1―3, Guest Series 4)
- Barney White as DS Dan Winters
- Rhian Blundell as DC Chloe Highsmith (Series 4―)
- Andy Gathergood as DI Paul Rabbit (Series 1―3)
- Alastair Mackenzie as DI Simon Lanesborough (Series 2)
- Juliet Stevenson as Dr. Helena Goldberg (Series 2―)
- Zoë Wanamaker as Zelda Radclyffe (Series 4―)
- Douglas Reith as Dean Wilfred Hamilton
- Sarah Woodward as Ingrid Snares
- Nicholas Jones as Peter Snares
- Mika Simmons as Kate Bryant

== Episodes ==
=== Series overview ===
| Series | Episodes | Originally released | |
| Series | Episodes | First released | Last released |
|---|---|---|---|
| 1 | 6 | 18 July 2021 | 22 August 2021 |
| 2 | 6 | 16 September 2022 | 28 October 2022 |
| 3 | 6 | 27 March 2024 | 1 May 2024 |
| 4 | 6 | 24 August 2025 | 28 September 2025 |
| 5 | 6 | 9 August 2026 | 9 August 2026 |

=== Series 1 (2021) ===
| No. overall | No. in series | Title | Directed by | Written by | Original release date | U.K. viewers (millions) |
|---|---|---|---|---|---|---|
| 1 | 1 | "Anatomy of a Memory" | Dries Vos | Matt Baker and Malin-Sarah Gozin | 11 July 2021 (US); 18 July 2021 (UK) | 5.41 |
Diana Tyson was violently attacked on the university campus. DS Lisa Donckers suspects that the assault is very similar to one that occurred years beforehand. Having previously been a student of Professor T, she thinks he can help.
| 2 | 2 | "A Fish Called Walter" | Dries Vos | Matt Baker and Malin-Sarah Gozin | 18 July 2021 (US); 25 July 2021 (UK) | 4.72 |
The university's chief librarian dies from a glass of poisoned wine at a party. Was he the intended target? The police asks Professor T for help.
| 3 | 3 | "Tiger Tiger" | Dries Vos | Matt Baker and Malin-Sarah Gozin | 25 July 2021 (US); 1 August 2021 (UK) | 4.48 |
A jeweller is run down in the street. In his bag he has a collection of very valuable diamonds. The police suspect there is more to it and visit his family.
| 4 | 4 | "Mother Love" | Dries Vos | Matt Baker and Malin-Sarah Gozin | 1 August 2021 (US); 8 August 2021 (UK) | 4.26 |
An au pair comes home after an evening off to find her employer unconscious in the living room. His daughter has vanished. The investigation leads the police to his business partner.
| 5 | 5 | "Sophie Knows" | Dries Vos | Matt Baker and Malin-Sarah Gozin | 8 August 2021 (US); 15 August 2021 (UK) | 4.13 |
A girl with Down syndrome claims she knows who murdered her mother, but she doesn't want to say who it is. She only trusts the professor. Lisa is worried about her father, and Dan has a surprise when he turns up for their date.
| 6 | 6 | "The Dutiful Child" | Dries Vos | Matt Baker and Malin-Sarah Gozin | 15 August 2021 (US); 22 August 2021 (UK) | 3.88 |
A prominent businessman is the target of a shooting during an official function. The attempt fails but the intended victim is found dead a few days later. A family feud reminds Jasper of his past.

=== Series 2 (2022) ===
| No. overall | No. in series | Title | Directed by | Written by | Original release date | U.K. viewers (millions) |
|---|---|---|---|---|---|---|
| 7 | 1 | "Ring of Fire" | Dries Vos | Matt Baker | 16 September 2022 (UK) | 3.40 |
When a university student is left badly burnt and in a coma after a house fire, detectives reluctantly call in the professor when it emerges that the victim was drugged and the fire deliberate.
| 8 | 2 | "The Mask Murders" | Dries Vos | Matt Baker | 23 September 2022 (UK) | 2.92 |
A prominent barrister and his wife are found shot dead in a crime that has uncanny similarities to a double murder that the barrister successfully prosecuted 15 years earlier.
| 9 | 3 | "The Family" | Dries Vos | Matt Baker | 30 September 2022 (UK) | 3.16 |
The Professor is asked to decipher a macabre puzzle when a doctor and her family are found dead in a grisly tableau on their living room sofa, each having died by different means. But in which order and by whom?
| 10 | 4 | "DNA of a Murderer" | Dries Vos | Matt Baker | 14 October 2022 (UK) | 2.98 |
When an artisan baker is found dead after receiving death threats, the police appear to have an open and shut case against the son of a convicted murderer who was sent to prison thanks to the baker's testimony.
| 11 | 5 | "The Trial" | Dries Vos | Matt Baker | 21 October 2022 (UK) | 3.01 |
The professor delivers a series of lectures detailing a high-profile court case of a caretaker accused of murdering his employer. The professor is convinced the man is innocent, bringing him into conflict with the CID team.
| 12 | 6 | "Swansong" | Dries Vos | Matt Baker | 28 October 2022 (UK) | <(2.92) |
After discovering the body of an undercover police officer, the CID team blunder into a Drugs Squad operation against a major trafficker that appears to implicate one of their closest colleagues.

=== Series 3 (2024) ===
| No. overall | No. in series | Title | Directed by | Written by | Original release date | U.K. viewers (millions) |
|---|---|---|---|---|---|---|
| 13 | 1 | "Heir to the Throne" | Dries Vos | Stephen Brady | 27 March 2024 (UK) | 3.45 |
Professor T is imprisoned awaiting trial. He is not a typical inmate and the sights, sounds and smells of jail are difficult for him. Dan and Lisa try to distract him with a murder case involving two brothers.
| 14 | 2 | "The Perfect Picture" | Dries Vos | Stephen Brady | 3 April 2024 (UK) | 3.17 |
A bride is found dead on her wedding night floating in the hotel swimming pool. The photos portray the perfect picture of happiness. But the police suspect foul play and enlist Professor T to help with the investigation.
| 15 | 3 | "Truth and Justice" | Dries Vos | Stephen Brady | 10 April 2024 (UK) | 3.12 |
Professor T is on trial and he must decide whether to save himself or his former lover. Meanwhile a prison officer is found dead and there is no shortage of suspects, but one in particular seems intent on taking the blame.
| 16 | 4 | "A Little Drop of Poison" | Dries Vos | Stephen Brady | 17 April 2024 (UK) | 3.04 |
Out of prison, the professor is eager to resume his work at the university and consultancy with the police. The detectives need his help to investigate a series of unexplained deaths before more people die, but his return is not fully welcomed.
| 17 | 5 | "The Conference" | Dries Vos | Stephen Brady | 24 April 2024 (UK) | 3.06 |
The professor is a suspect when his rival colleague is murdered at a Criminology Conference. Professor T must prove his innocence and find the murderer so that he can regain his reputation and return to his job at the university.
| 18 | 6 | "Attachment Issues" | Dries Vos | Stephen Brady | 1 May 2024 (UK) | 3.00 |
A woman is found dead at the scene of a car crash, but is found to have been strangled. The professor finds himself unfurling memories of his own. He discovers his mother killed his father to protect her son from his violence, which sets back his promising conquering of his OCD. Just after accepting Dan's marriage proposal, Lisa is run over and killed by the same woman who killed the original victim.

=== Series 4 (2025) ===
| No. overall | No. in series | Title | Directed by | Written by | Original release date | U.K. viewers (millions) |
|---|---|---|---|---|---|---|
| 19 | 1 | "Overboard" | Kaat Biels & Dries Vos | Stephen Brady | 24 August 2025 (US); 19 August 2026 (UK) | N/A |
| 20 | 2 | "September Gardens" | Kaat Biels & Dries Vos | Stephen Brady | 31 August 2025 (US); 26 August 2026 (UK) | N/A |
| 21 | 3 | "The Inspection" | Kaat Biels & Dries Vos | Stephen Brady | 7 September 2025 (US); 2 September 2026 (UK) | N/A |
| 22 | 4 | "You Can't Kill Me" | Kaat Biels & Dries Vos | Stephen Brady | 14 September 2025 (US); 9 September 2026 (UK) | N/A |
| 23 | 5 | "The Perfect Murder" | Kaat Biels & Dries Vos | Stephen Brady | 21 September 2025 (US); 16 September 2026 (UK) | N/A |
| 24 | 6 | "The Warrior Gene" | Kaat Biels & Dries Vos | Stephen Brady | 28 September 2025 (US); 23 September 2026 (UK) | N/A |

=== Series 5 (2026) ===
| No. overall | No. in series | Title | Directed by | Written by | Original release date | U.K. viewers (millions) |
|---|---|---|---|---|---|---|
| 25 | 1 | "Natural Causes" | Kaat Beels & Joel Vanhoebrouck | Stephen Brady | 9 August 2026 (US) | N/A |
While Professor T. and Dr. Goldberg are on a trial weekend at a spa, two deaths there apparently from natural causes on consecutive days are too much for Professor T. to accept.
| 26 | 2 | "The Ring" | Kaat Beels & Joel Vanhoebrouck | Stephen Brady | 9 August 2026 (US) | N/A |
| 27 | 3 | "Retreat" | Kaat Beels & Joel Vanhoebrouck | Stephen Brady | 9 August 2026 (US) | N/A |
| 28 | 4 | "Ghostwriter" | Kaat Beels & Joel Vanhoebrouck | Stephen Brady | 9 August 2026 (US) | N/A |
| 29 | 5 | "Cipher" | Kaat Beels & Joel Vanhoebrouck | Stephen Brady | 9 August 2026 (US) | N/A |
| 30 | 6 | "The Things We Do for Love" | Kaat Beels & Joel Vanhoebrouck | Stephen Brady | 9 August 2026 (US) | N/A |

== Location ==
Jesus College, Cambridge features prominently, although the series was mainly filmed in Belgium.

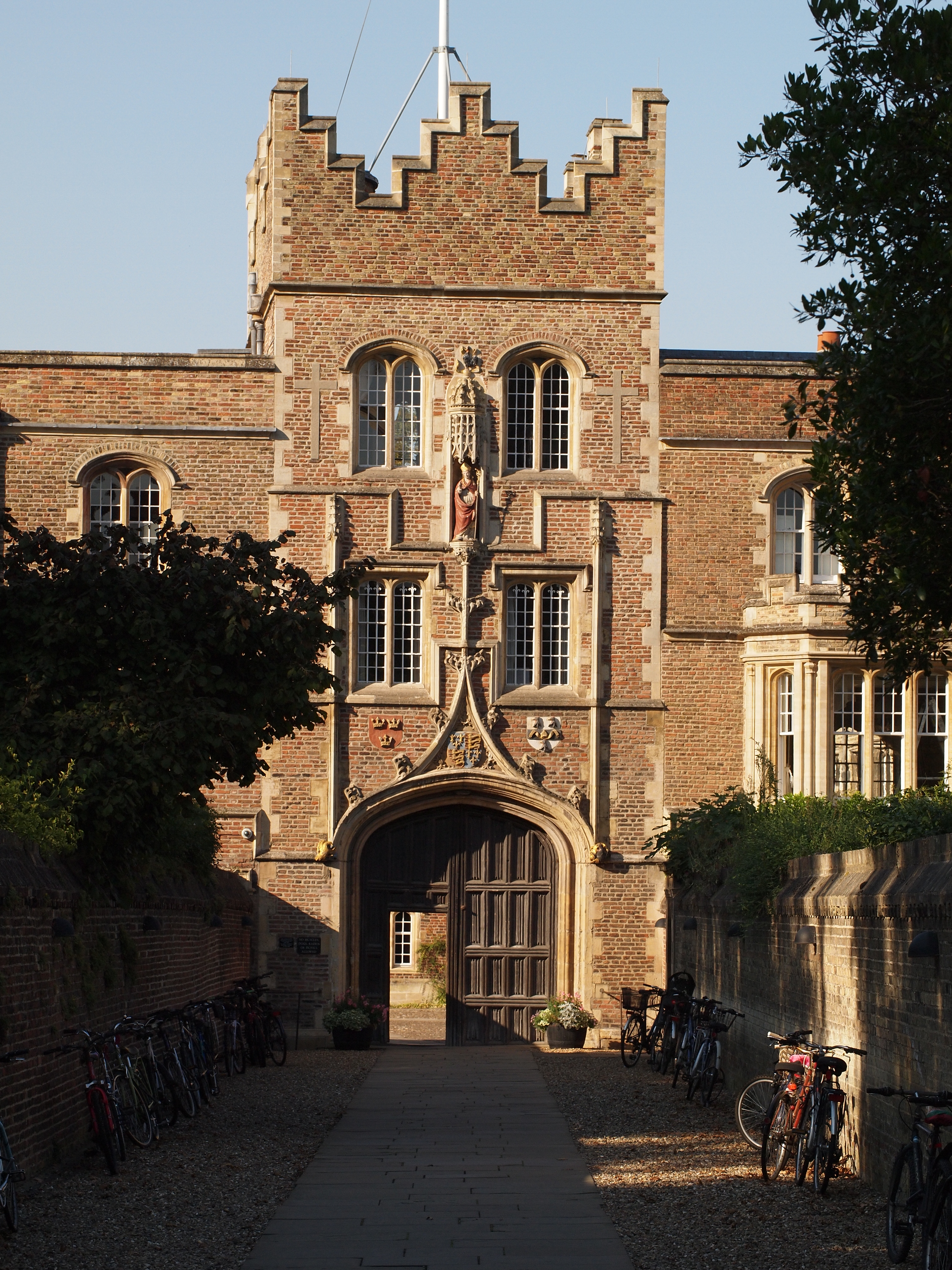
The main entrance on Jesus Lane

== Reception ==
Carol Midgley of The Times gave it two stars out of five, praising Miller but lambasting the plot and tonal shifts. Ed Cumming of The Independent also commended Miller's performance as well as Naomi's and de la Tour's, but suggested that the show "isn't quite there yet".

Anita Singh of The Daily Telegraph criticised the use of rape in the show's first episode, as well as the scenes depicting the attacks, stating: "There is promise in Tempest's story, but, please, can this be the last time that rape is used as cheap entertainment?".

=== Controversy ===
Professor T. received strong criticism from national OCD organisations, arguing the show promoted stereotypes (akin to Channel 4's Obsessive Compulsive Cleaners). The Chief Executive of the British charity OCD-UK stated:

The start of the series is no better than the opening sequence... a pair of hands being scrubbed hospital theatre style, rather than OCD style, and just like that ITV's failure to accurately portray OCD begins. As that first scene ends, not a word spoken and this crime series already feels like a crime against the accurate portrayal of mental health problems. The reality is that OCD doesn't really appear integral to the show and is not adding anything but creating a quirkiness about the character, and that could so easily have been done without giving the character Compulsive Disorder.... I won't say Obsessive-Compulsive Disorder, because there doesn't appear to be any reference to the obsessions that cause the behaviours across any of the six episodes. Whilst I know that Professor T is not a documentary, ITV have a responsibility not to create programming that is stigmatic and perpetuates stereotypes.
