= Susanne Hoss =

German actress (born 1968)

- Born: East Berlin, East Germany
- Occupation: actress.

Susanne Hoss (born 1968 in East Berlin) is a German actress.

Hoss grew up in Berlin. She studied acting at the Theaterhochschule Hans Otto in Leipzig. During her studies, she played the female lead in the feature film Vorspiel and appeared on stage at the Staatsschauspiel Dresden as part of her practical training, making her stage debut as Marie in Christoph Hein's "Passage". Engagements at the Theater Erfurt and the Saarländisches Staatstheater Saarbrücken followed. Her classic roles in Saarbrücken included Mascha in Anton Chekhov's Three Sisters, Kunigunde in Das Käthchen von Heilbronn by Heinrich von Kleist and Portia in The Merchant of Venice by William Shakespeare. She received the acting prize for her portrayal of Ginevra in Merlin oder Das wüste Land by Tankred Dorst. She has also played leading roles in musicals such as Little Shop of Horrors, The Rocky Horror Show, Cyrano de Bergerac and City of Angels.

== Filmography (selection) ==
- 1987: Vorspiel, directed by Peter Kahane, DEFA
- 1988: Unlimited Surprises, FESA / Freunde der italienischen Oper, directed by Wolf Götz Richter / R.J.K.K. Hänsch
- 1997: Comedian Harmonists, director: Joseph Vilsmaier
- 1998: Highspeed, director: Stefan Bartmann
- 1999: Die Singlefalle, director: Michael Keusch
- 1999: The Waiting Time, director: Stuart Orme
- 1999: Alarm for Cobra 11 - Die schwarze Rose
- 2000: Der Puma, directed by Axel de Roche, action directed by Donnie Yen
- 2001: Der Ermittler - Mord auf dem Golfplatz, directed by Dirk Regel
- 2002: girl friends - Freundschaft mit Herz (5th season)
- 2002: Lilly unter den Linden, director: Erwin Keusch
- 2002: Balko, director: Daniel Helfer
- 2003: girl friends - Freundschaft mit Herz (6th season)
- 2004: Familie Dr. Kleist, director: Erwin Keusch
- 2004: Ein Fall für zwei, director: Michael Kreindl
- 2005: Tsunami, director: Winfried Oelsner
- 2006: Another Word and I'll Marry You!, director: Wilhelm Engelhardt
- 2007: R. I. S. - Die Sprache der Toten, director: Michael Kreindl
- 2007: Notruf Hafenkante - Fahrerflucht, director: Erwin Keusch
- 2007/2017: SOKO Wismar (TV series, 2 episodes)
- 2007-2021: SOKO Leipzig (TV series, 4 episodes)
- 2009: Die Rosenheim-Cops - Tod nach Dienstschluss
- 2009: Polizeiruf 110: Blutiges Geld, director: Hans Werner
- 2010: Eichmanns Ende - Liebe, Verrat, Tod, director: Raymond Ley
- 2010: Der Kriminalist, director: Züli Aladag
- 2010: Der letzte Bulle (TV series) - Episode: Klassentreffen
- 2010: Der Staatsanwalt, director: Martin Kinkel
- 2010/2020: SOKO Stuttgart (TV series, 2 episodes)
- 2013: Lotta & die frohe Zukunft, directed by Gero Weinreuter
- 2016: In aller Freundschaft - Die jungen Ärzte (TV series, episode Nochmal mit Gefühl)
