= Der Kriminalist =

- Title card
- Starring: Christian Berkel
- Country of origin: Germany
- No. of seasons: 15

Production
- Running time: 60 min

Original release
- Network: ZDF
- Release: 8 December 2006

Der Kriminalist is a German television series produced by Monaco Film Hamburg, subsidiary of Odeon Film.

Directors during the first season were Sherry Hormann and Torsten C. Fischer, during the second: Thomas Jahn, Jobst Oetzmann and Torsten C. Fischer.

== List of episodes ==
#	Title	EA	Directed by	Written by	Cast
1.1	Am Abgrund	08-12-2006	Sherry Hormann	Clemens Murath	Fabian Hinrichs, Olivia Pascal, Rainer Strecker, Max Urlacher
1.2	Gefallene Engel	15-12-2006	Torsten C. Fischer	Ralf Hertwig, Kathrin Richter	Jan-Gregor Kremp, Max Riemelt, Hansa Czypionka, Anna Maria Mühe, Birge Schade
1.3	Mördergroupie	22-12-2006	Sherry Hormann	Ralf Hertwig, Kathrin Richter	Richy Müller, Angela Roy, Rainer Will, Hans-Jochen Wagner
1.4	Außer Kontrolle	05-01-2007	Torsten C. Fischer	Clemens Murath	Hannes Hellmann Catherine Flemming, Anna Fischer, Stephan Kampwirth
1.5	Verbranntes Glück	12-01-2007	Torsten C. Fischer	Michael Illner	Sylvester Groth, Sergej Moya, Alexander Fehling, Martin Brambach
1.6	Totgeschwiegen	19-01-2007	Sherry Hormann	Gerlinde Wolf, Kerstin Cantz	Andreas Schmidt, Sophie von Kessel, Matthias Matschke, Tonio Arango, Jytte-Merle Böhrnsen
2.1	Abwärts	14-09-2007	Thomas Jahn	Clemens Murath	Wotan Wilke Möhring, Diego Wallraff, Pegah Ferydoni, Indira Weis
2.2	Dunkles Geheimnis	12-10-2007	Thomas Jahn	Herbert Kugler, Tom Maier	Gesine Cukrowski, Klaus J. Behrendt, Maximilian Mauff, Tom Jahn
2.3	Freier Fall	09-11-2007	Thomas Jahn	Christoph Silber, Thorsten Wettcke	Johann von Bülow, Philipp Danne, Oliver Stritzel, Jürgen Rißmann
2.4	Ein ideales Opfer	14-12-2007	Jobst C. Oetzmann	Sven S. Poser	Katrin Sass, Christina Große, Jörg Hartmann, Alma Leiberg, Thomas Lawinky
2.5	Fahrt in den Tod	04-01-2008	Jobst C. Oetzmann	Jochen Greve	Tino Mewes, Neelesha Bavora-Barthel, Peter Kurth, Pit Bukowski, Murali Perumal
2.6	Vertrauenssache	11-01-2008	Torsten C. Fischer	Kathrin Richter	Helmut Berger, Floriane Daniel, Hans-Werner Meyer, Niki Greb
2.7	Schein und Sein	18-01-2008	Torsten C. Fischer	Michael Illner	Hans-Uwe Bauer, Volkmar Kleinert, Franz Dinda, Lisa Kreuzer
2.8	Unter Freunden	25-01-2008	Torsten C. Fischer	Clemens Murath	Günther Maria Halmer, Dagmar Manzel, Christian Grashof, Hartmut Becker, Christian Tasche
3.1	Bluesgewehr	10-10-2008	Dagmar Hirtz	Clemens Murath	Susanne Bormann, Teresa Harder, Jana Klinge, Heiko Senst, Eberhard Kirchberg, Victoria Deutschmann, Marie Gruber, Margarita Broich
3.2	Eiskalter Tod	17-10-2008	Buddy Giovinazzo	Wolf R. Kuhl	Ludwig Blochberger, Annika Blendl, Leslie Malton, Hubertus Hartmann, Michael Kind, Rhon Diels, Dietrich Adam, Nils Nelleßen
3.3	Schlaflos	24-10-2008	Dagmar Hirtz	Esther Bernstorff	Thomas Thieme, Marie Zielcke, Katharina Schubert, Wolfram Koch, Steffen Schroeder, Cornelia Schmaus
3.4	Ruhe in Frieden	31-10-2008	Buddy Giovinazzo	Markus Hoffmann	Karoline Eichhorn, Heikko Deutschmann, Michael Schenk, Boris Aljinovic, Wolfgang Packhäuser, Jannis Michel
3.5	Zwischen den Welten	08-05-2009	Elmar Fischer	Georg Lemppenau, Felix Randau	Dominic Raacke, Detlev Buck, Jenny Schily, Omar El Saedi
3.6	Zerschlagene Träume	15-05-2009	Elmar Fischer	Herbert Kugler, Tom Maier	Karl Kranzkowski, Remo Schulze, Britta Hammelstein
3.7	Mauer im Kopf	22-05-2009	Buddy Giovinazzo	Christoph Silber, Thorsten Wettcke	Florian Bartholomäi, Carina Wiese, Christian Maria Goebel
3.8	Die Kronzeugin	29-05-2009	Elmar Fischer	Markus Stromiedel, Silke Schwella	André Hennicke, Hans Peter Hallwachs, Mina Tander
4.1	Das Geständnis	25-09-2009	Thomas Jahn	Christoph Silber, Thorsten Wettcke	Max Urlacher, Pjotr Olev
4.2	Der gute Samariter	02-10-2009	Thomas Jahn	Christoph Silber, Thorsten Wettcke	Oliver Mommsen, Nina Schwabe, Sven Martinek, Carin C. Tietze, Jakob Knoblauch, Philipp von Schulthess
4.3	Spurlos	09-10-2009	Thomas Jahn	Clemens Murath	Valerie Koch, Uwe Preuss, Harald Schrott, Julia Jäger
4.4	Die vierte Gewalt	16-10-2009	Christian Görlitz	Markus Hoffmann	Pierre Besson, Mariah K. Friedrich, Andreas Schmidt, Hannes Wegener
4.5	Amok	19-02-2010	Christian Görlitz	Ulf Tschauder	Stefan Konarske, Lea Draeger, Steffi Kühnert, Christian Redl
4.6	Getauschtes Leben	26-02-2010	Christian Görlitz	Esther Bernstorff	Susanne Lothar, Rainer Bock, Birge Schade, Andreas Patton
4.7	Der Schatten	05-03-2010	Züli Aladağ	Lorenz Lau-Uhle	Alice Dwyer, Constantin von Jascheroff
4.8	Tod gegen Liebe	12-03-2010	Züli Aladağ	Kathrin Richter	Joachim Król, Ursina Lardi, Marie-Lou Sellem, Xenia Georgia Assenza, Jonas Hain
5.1	Schatten der Vergangenheit	15-10-2010	Thomas Jahn	Thomas Jahn	Andreas Guenther, Volker Lechtenbrink, Marc Benjamin Puch, Brigitte Grothum
5.2	Das Vogelmädchen	22-10-2010	Christian Görlitz	Esther Bernstorff	Lisa Hagmeister, Jürgen Tarrach
5.3	Schuld und Sühne	29-10-2010	Thomas Jahn	Markus Hoffmann, Uwe Kossmann	Ken Duken, Pegah Ferydoni, Navíd Akhavan
5.4	Das Verhör	05-11-2010	Thomas Jahn	Thomas Jahn	Suzan Anbeh, Lea Eisleb, Joachim Król, Friederike Kempter
5.5	Zwischen den Fronten	05-11-2010	Christian Görlitz	Clemens Murath	Nhi Ngoc Nguyen-Hermann, Aaron Hong Le, Maverick Quek
5.6	Dierhagens Vermächtnis	25-02-2011	Christian Görlitz	Ulf Tschauder	Jan-Gregor Kremp, Hendrik Duryn, Thomas Schendel, Lenn Kudrjawizki
5.7	Tod eines Begleiters	11-03-2011	Züli Aladağ	Lorenz Lau-Uhle	Sonja Kirchberger, Johann von Bülow, Sibylle Canonica, Daniel Roth
5.8	Abgetaucht	18-03-2011	Züli Aladağ	Christoph Silber, Thorsten Wettcke, Züli Aladag	Edgar Selge, Christian Koerner, Rolf Kanies, Dorka Gryllus, Susanne Hoss
6.1	Unter Druck	11-11-2011	Hannu Salonen	Thorsten Wettcke, Christoph Silber	Thelma Buabeng, Marie Gruber, Andreas Hofer, Sebastian Hülk, Dietmar Mues
6.2	Der Beschützer	18-11-2011	Hannu Salonen	Lorenz Lau-Uhle	Vladimir Burlakov, Konstantin Frolov, Godehard Giese, Karolina Lodyga, Torsten Michaelis, Rainer Reiners, Janek Rieke, Katharina Rivilis, Devid Striesow
6.3	Grüsse von Johnny Silver	25-11-2011	Hannu Salonen	Clemens Murath	Michael Bornhütter, Fabian Busch, Judith Hoersch, Alexander Hörbe, Volkmar Kleinert, Christian Kuchenbuch, Claudia Mehnert, Ellenie Salvo González, Kay Bartholomäus Schulze, Anian Zollner
6.4	Sucht	02-12-2011	Filippos Tsitos	Clemens Murath	Neil Malik Abdullah, Suzan Anbeh, Lutz Blochberger, Cedric Eich, Sonja Hilberger, Sandra Hüller, Herbert Olschok, Bernd Stegemann, Anjorka Strechel, Carina Wiese
6.5	Schamlos	18-05-2012	Filippos Tsitos	Douglas Wissmann	Jenny Elvers-Elbertzhagen, Maria Käser, Ingo Naujoks, Nils Nelleßen, Jimi Blue Ochsenknecht, Jörg Pose, Caroline Redl, Patrick Winczewski
6.6	Magdalena	25-05-2012	Christian Görlitz	Ulf Tschauder	Lena Dörrie, Leonard Carow, Stephan Bissmeier, Ute Willing, Julia Friede, Tina Engel, Patrick Heyn
6.7	Ohnmacht	01-06-2012	Christian Görlitz	Marija Erceg	Nils Nelleßen, Karin Hanczewski, Melika Foroutan, Alexander Beyer, Dominique Chiout, Andreas Pietschmann, Rene Schoenenberger, Max Boekhoff, Suzan Anbeh
7.1	Des Königs Schwert	19-10-2012	Hannu Salonen	Hannu Salonen	Jürgen Schornagel, Suzanne von Borsody, Carla Juri, Emilio De Marchi, Bernhard Leute, Rainer Reiners, Norbert Stöß
7.2	Schumanns Fehler	26-10-2012	Christian Görlitz	Daniel Douglas Wissmann	Lavinia Wilson, Matthias Faust, Marian Meder, Alexandra Finder, Peter Benedict, Frank Jacobsen, Marko Bräutigam, Mike Adler, Monika Lennartz, Marie Burchard
7.3	Blaues Blut	02-11-2012	Christian Görlitz	Lorenz Lau-Uhle	Markus Hering, Leonie Benesch, Antonia Gerke, Shenja Lacher, Björn Bugri, Noémi Besedes, Suzan Anbeh
7.4	Todgeweiht	09-11-2012	Hannu Salonen	Khyana El Bitar, Matthias Keilich	Barbara Philipp, David Rott, Axel Wandtke, Raphaël Vogt, Hassan Akkouch, Matthias Dittmer
7.5	Lebenslänglich	16-11-2012	Christian Görlitz	Frank Koopmann, Jeanet Pfitzer	Arnd Klawitter, David Rott, Axel Schreiber, Stephan Baumecker, Sandra Borgmann, Rainer Sellien, Corinna Breite, Suzan Anbeh
8.1	Dolly 2.0	03-05-2013	Christian Görlitz	Frank Koopmann, Jeanet Pfitzer	Barbara Prakopenka, Jasna Fritzi Bauer, Judith Engel, Florian Martens, Ole Fischer, Carmen Birk, Samia Muriel Chancrin
8.2	Der Sobottka-Clan	10-05-2013	Hannu Salonen	Ulf Tschauder	Katrin Sass, Carolyn Genzkow, Jens Münchow, Max Hopp, Tino Mewes, Christian Beermann, Nora Hütz, Rebecca Rudolph, Christof Düro
8.3	Nacht am See	17-05-2013	Christian Görlitz	Clemens Murath	Max Gertsch, Nina Kronjäger, Olga Nasfeter, Urs Fabian Winiger, Kristin Meyer, Michael A. Grimm, Alma Leiberg, Victoria Fleer
8.4	Vergeltung	24-05-2013	Christian Görlitz	Christoph Darnstädt	Sylvester Groth, Thomas Heinze, Luc Feit, Max Kidd, Trystan W. Pütter, Michael Baral, Daniel Aichinger, Thomas Lawinky, Kerstin Reimann, Kai-Peter Gläser
