= Emma Naomi =

British actress

- Born: London, England
- Education: Guildhall School of Music and Drama (BA)
- Occupation: Actress
- Years active: 2015–present
- Known for: Bridgerton; Professor T

Emma Naomi is a British actress. She is best known for her roles in the television series Professor T. and Bridgerton, and is a winner of a National Film Award for Best Supporting Actress in a TV Series.

== Early life and education ==
Naomi was born in London, the daughter of two nurses, and has a mixed Jamaican and Irish heritage. She studied at the Guildhall School of Music and Drama, earning a BA in acting.

== Career ==
Naomi’s career started in 2015 on stage at the Bristol Old Vic followed by acting in theatres across London and the UK including Royal Manchester Exchange, Leeds Playhouse, Royal Theatre Bath, Oldham Coliseum, The Wyndhams Theatre, The Harold Pinter Theatre and The Duke of York's Theatre . Since 2020, she has played the recurring role of Alice Mondrich in Bridgerton. From 2021 to 2024, she appeared for three series as Detective Inspector Lisa Donckers in the crime drama Professor T. For her Professor T. performance, Naomi won Best Supporting Actress in a TV Series at the 2022 National Film Awards. Also in 2022, Naomi appeared as Hannah in the mystery romantic drama film Surprised by Oxford.

In 2024, Naomi played Chelsea Fielding in Episode 8 of Series 13 of Death in Paradise, and in 2025, she appeared as Miss Meadows in What It Feels Like for a Girl and as Ann Ratigan in Too Much TV series.

== Personal life ==
At the start of her career, between theatre performances, Naomi worked various jobs including as a Zumba fitness instructor.
