= Matthias Koeberlin =

German actor and reciter (born 1974)

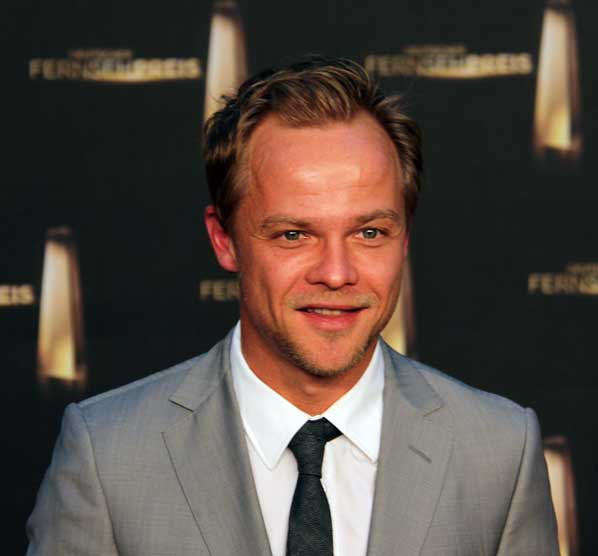
Matthias Koeberlin in 2012

Matthias Koeberlin (born 28 March 1974, Mainz) is a German actor and reciter. His work includes the British-German co-production The Sinking of the Laconia (2010, UK premiere, 2011) and 2017 in German television series Charité he played role of German physician Emil Behring.

== Selected filmography ==
- Golden Boy (2000, TV film)
- Babykram ist Männersache (2001, TV film)
- Die zwei Leben meines Vaters (2001, TV film)
- The Hunt for the Hidden Relic (2002, TV film)
- F4: Vortex (2006, TV film)
- The Conclave (2006)
- The Hunt for Troy (2007, TV film)
- Volcano (2009, TV film)
- The Sinking of the Laconia (2010, TV film)
- Residual Risk (2011, TV film)
- Die Schuld der Erben (2012, TV film)
- Robin Hood (2013, TV film)
- The Stalker (2013, TV film)
- Death at the Baltic Sea (2013, TV film)
- Afghanistan: A Murderous Decision (2013, TV film)
- Murder by the Lake (since 2014, TV crime-series)
