= Murder by the Lake =

- Also known as: Die Toten vom Bodensee
- Genre: Crime
- Starring: Matthias Koeberlin; Nora Waldstätten; Hary Prinz; Stefan Pohl; Inez Bjørg David
- Countries of origin: Germany; Austria
- Original language: German
- No. of episodes: 10+

Production
- Executive producers: Sam Davis; Klaus Graf; Kim Fatheuer; Annette Köster
- Running time: 89 minutes
- Production companies: Rowboat Film- und Fernsehproduktion; Graf Filmproduktion

Original release
- Network: ZDF; ORF
- Release: October 11, 2014 (ORF)

Murder by the Lake is a German-Austrian TV crime series that has been produced since 2014 by Rowboat Film- und Fernsehproduktion and Graf Filmproduktion in cooperation with the German television broadcaster ZDF and the Austrian television broadcaster ORF. The series is filmed and set in the adjacent towns of Bregenz, Austria, and Lindau, Germany, which are both located on the southeastern shore of Lake Constance. Sixteen episodes have been broadcast as of February, 2023.

== Premise ==
German homicide detective Micha Oberländer (Matthias Koeberlin) and his Austrian counterpart Hannah Zeiler (Nora Waldstätten) are partners in a (fictional) German-Austrian cooperative police agency located at the border between the towns of Bregenz and Lindau. Their job is to solve murders that take place with evidence or clues in both countries, and since international boundaries are not defined in the lake, a multinational approach is essential. The series contrasts the different personalities of the two detectives: while Micha is personable and hot-blooded, Hannah is unemotional and has difficulty with social interactions. Despite, or because of, their different characters and methods, Micha and Hannah make a brilliant team. The longer they work together the more they enjoy each other's company. Maybe even more than they would like to admit. Helping the team is their thorough but plodding colleague Thomas Komlatschek (Hary Prinz).

Recurring subplots in the series are Oberländer's marital difficulties and Zeiler's search for her missing father.

Since episode 16, the mysterious Austrian inspector Luisa Hoffman (Alina Fritsch) investigates alongside Micha Oberländer. Zeiler died offscreen in a motorcycle accident.

== Episodes ==
| No. | Title | Original title | Directed by | Written by | Viewers Germany (million) | Original air date (ORF) | German airdate (ZDF) |
|---|---|---|---|---|---|---|---|
| 1 | "Murder by the Lake - The Celtic Mystery" | Die Toten vom Bodensee | Andreas Linke | Thorsten Wettcke | 6.6 | October 11, 2014 | 3 November 2014 |
In an explosion of a boat on Lake Constance, on the German side of the border, a fisherman is burned alive. When the boat is recovered, the police find an eerie mask of a Celtic deity and a cryptic message in a strange language. The mask had been stolen from a museum in Austria. Because of the transborder nature of this case, chief inspector Micha Oberländer (Matthias Koeberlin) from Lindau and inspector Hannah Zeiler (Nora Waldstätten) from Bregenz are assigned to work together. The two detectives could not be any more different, but they are forced to come to a working arrangement. The recovered mask leads Zeiler and Oberländer to the brother of the deceased, Ludwig Pfeilschifter (Stephan Kampwirth). He and his wife Christa (Doris Schretzmayer) found three Celtic masks in a nearby mountain crevice fifteen years ago. The three masks, however, had recently been stolen from their private museum. Then Christa's father Walter (Karl Fischer) is found slashed and hung to a tree with the second mask. Zeiler and Oberländer race against the clock to prevent a third murder.
| 2 | "Murder by the Lake 2 - Family Issues" | Die Toten vom Bodensee - Familiengeheimnis | Andreas Linke | Thorsten Wettcke; Christoph Silber | 7.53 | March 4, 2015 | 16 March 2015 |
At a forester's cabin on the German-Austrian border near Lake Constance, a nearly dead forester is found lying on the floor with foam in his mouth and €100,000 in cash in an envelope. In the cabin the walls are smeared with blood and a human arm is found nearby. Furthermore, the forester's doberman pinscher is missing. Austrian detective Hannah Zeiler (Nora Waldstätten) and her German colleague Micha Oberländer (Matthias Koeberlin) are called to this crime scene to work on their new cross-border case. Oberländer is shocked when he hears about the horrible crime: he knew the forester's family well and now he has to dig into his own past to solve this crime.
| 3 | "Murder by the Lake 3 - The Sleepwalker" | Die Toten vom Bodensee - Stille Wasser | Andreas Linke | Timo Berndt | 6.77 | April 2, 2016 | 18 April 2016 |
The dead body of a woman, who turns out to be schoolteacher Julia Niermeyer, is caught in a fisherman's net in Lake Constance. Hannah Zeiler (Nora Waldstätten) and her German colleague Micha Oberänder (Matthias Koeberlin) are called to the crime scene. While it first seems to be only a tragic swimming accident, the autopsy reveals a violent crime. During their search for clues, Zeiler and Oberländer find 10-year-old sleepwalker Noemi Rademann (Nare Knöpfle) - barefoot and only dressed in her pajamas - near the teacher's apartment. Did the girl see anything and what is she afraid of? This case becomes an emotional roller coaster for Zeiler, who is taken aback by her own traumatic childhood memories. And as if solving of this case isn't enough, Oberländer has to solve his marriage problems as well. He and his wife Kim (Inez Bjørg David) argue all the time, because he is on call 24 hours a day.
| 4 | "Murder by the Lake 4 - Till Death do them Part" | Die Toten vom Bodensee - Die Braut | Hannu Salonen | Timo Berndt | 7.98 | March 9, 2017 | 1 May 2017 |
The wedding should have been the most beautiful day of their lives, but a traditional bride kidnapping turns tragic when groom Christian Höflinger (Franz Hartwig) finds his bride (Sina Reiß) murdered in a nature reserve for cormorants. Does an environmental action group have anything to do with the murder? Or did someone have something against the fact that beautiful Maja was about to marry into the wealthy family headed by Erich (Harald Krassnitzer) and Johanna Höflinger (Sissy Höfferer)?
| 5 | "Murder by the Lake 5 - The Girl who Loved to Laugh" | Die Toten vom Bodensee - Abgrundtief | Hannu Salonen | Timo Berndt | 6.92 | March 15, 2017 | 2 October 2017 |
In Lake Constance the well preserved body of a young girl is found. It was weighed down with iron chains. The corpse is identified as Marie Häusler (Tamara Röske), a girl with Down's syndrome who disappeared 15 years ago shortly before her 18th birthday without leaving a trace. During the autopsy, coroner Thomas Egger (Stefan Pohl) is mysteriously attacked and the iron chains are stolen. Because of this, Zeiler and Oberländer think that the murderer has to be a local. They investigate the Häusler family, but everything seems to be normal. Marie was loved by her father Manfred Häusler (Cornelius Obonya) and had a close relationship with her step-mother Jasmin (Katharina Stemberger). So who wanted the young innocent and happy Marie Häusler dead?
| 6 | "Murder by the Lake 6 - The Return" | Die Toten vom Bodensee - Der Wiederkehrer | Hannu Salonen | Timo Berndt | 8.01 | January 13, 2018 | 22 January 2018 |
On isolated Gallows Island, near Lindau, the dead body of Johannes Leitner (Christian Kuchenbuch) is found. Beside him lies the Austrian detective Hannah Zeiler, unconscious. The bullet that killed Leitner was fired from Zeiler‘s gun. She tells her colleague Micha Oberländer that she followed the victim, who she suspected to know something of her father’s fate, to the island and was brutally knocked out. It is not clear if the death of Leitner was murder or suicide — for Oberländer it is murder, for Zeiler’s former mentor Ernst Gschwendner (August Schmölzer) it is suicide. Although Zeiler is shut out of the investigation because of her personal involvement, she – with the help of Oberländer and Komlatschek – is determined to find the truth. Especially because information surfaces that her father could still be alive after all.
| 7 | "Murder by the Lake 7 - The Fourth Woman" | Die Toten vom Bodensee - Die vierte Frau | Hannu Salonen | Timo Berndt | 8.18 | February 3, 2018 | 1 October 2018 |
The dead body of Jutta Reike is found in a hops field near Lake Constance. Like three previous victims of a serial killer, Jutta Reike was hung in a spider web on a seven meter high scaffold by the perpetrator. But some details of the cause of death don't resemble the pattern of the other homicides. Zeiler and Oberländer wonder if this is a copycat crime. Shortly after the death of Jutta Reike, a swimmer is run over by a motorboat on the lake and killed. In his car Zeiler and Oberländer find evidence that connects victim Dietrich Falkner (Peter Strauß) to the serial killing. Everything seems to fit until Zeiler and Oberländer discover that Falkner can't be the murderer of Jutta Reike. So the hunt for the second murderer begins.
| 8 | "Murder by the Lake 8 - Death in the Forest" | Die Toten vom Bodensee - Der Stumpengang | Michael Schneider | Timo Berndt | 7.88 | January 3, 2019 | 4 February 2019 |
The dead body of a forester is found in a forest by high school students on a field trip with their teacher. The class was learning about a 14th century folk justice ceremony in which a criminal was forced to run on a forest trail, enduring beatings along the way, all the while with his hands bound in Stumpen, or leather cups. The forester's hands were bound in the same way. Zeiler and Oberländer must determine who wanted the forester dead and what was the significance of the Stumpen. Had the forester committed a crime?
| 9 | "Murder by the Lake 9 - The Mermaid" | Die Toten vom Bodensee - Die Meerjungfrau | Michael Schneider | Timo Berndt | 6.32 | September 10, 2019 | 21 October 2019 |
Detectives Zeiler and Oberländer are called to a murder scene on the shore of Lake Constance. The victim was a mermaid. Sybille Baumgartner, wife of a famous local vintner, was found stabbed to death in shallow water wearing a costume rubber mermaid tail. She was a member of a local kitesurfing club. Meanwhile, Matteo, another member of the club, is shown leaving the scene of the crime stabbed with a knife still embedded in his abdomen. Oberländer and Zeiler need to figure out who wanted Sybille dead. Was it Matteo? Another member of the kitesurfing club? Or was her family to blame?
| 10 | "Murder by the Lake 10 - Curse from the Depths" | Die Toten vom Bodensee - Fluch aus der Tiefe | Michael Schneider | Timo Berndt | 6.89 | January 2, 2020 | 10 February 2020 |
Treasure hunter and diver Florian Friedrichs, his girlfriend Stephanie, and assistant Manuel Mohr recover a fabulous hoard of 17th century gold coins from the bottom of Lake Constance. The coins are the legendary 'Pestilence Pennies' which the Bregenz townspeople had paid in 1630 to a local witch in hopes of ending a recurrence of the plague. A few days later, however, Friedrichs is found murdered with a gold coin in his mouth and his lips sewn together. Detectives Zeiler and Oberländer soon find that Friedrichs had made many enemies well before the treasure find. And the treasure was supposed to be cursed by the witch. Could the curse be coming true? Matters are not helped by Oberländer's abrasive behavior towards his colleagues, caused by the events of episode 9.
| 11 | "Murder by the Lake 11 - Blood Procession" | Die Toten vom Bodensee - Der Blutritt | Michael Schneider | Timo Berndt | 6.54 | September 2, 2020 | 7 September 2020 |
During the yearly “Blood Procession” with over 3.000 horses, Marlene Stöhr is shot by an arrow from a crossbow and is now on life support. Her son Oliver is the first at the scene. After being blamed for the death of his godmother and a prized racehorse in a fire three years ago, he fled from Lake Constance and returned only recently. Shortly before being shot, Marlene thought she saw the precious racehorse, alive. Detectives Micha Oberländer and Hannah Zeiler have to find the shooter and a mysterious horse in an equestrian world dominated by power and greed.
| 12 | "Murder by the Lake 12 - Haunted" | Die Toten vom Bodensee - Der Wegspuk | Michael Schneider | Timo Berndt | 8.47 | December 30, 2020 | 18 January 2021 |
In an abandoned villa, Jakob Stocking is in a fight for his life with a building contractor named Ingo Hauer. Only after he kills him with a knife, Jakob realizes three children were watching him. He flees the crime scene only to return later accompanied by his lawyer Mia Burgstaller to turn himself in. As more and more questions pile up, Micha Oberländer and Hannah Zeiler have to uncover a long-kept family secret, while also being faced with major personal challenges.
| 13 | "Murder by the Lake 13 - Soul Circle" | Die Toten vom Bodensee - Der Seelenkreis | Michael Schneider | Timo Berndt | 7.34 | October 20, 2021 | 11 November 2021 |
A newborn baby is washed upon the shore of Lake Constance in a basket. Hannah Zeiler and Micha Oberländer discover that the mother is Rita Haffner, who disappeared six months ago and was presumed to have been murdered. To solve this mystery and find Rita alive in time, the detectives have to dive deep into folkloric traditions, enigmatic symbols and dark legends.
| 14 | "Murder by the Lake 14 - The Second Face" | Die Toten vom Bodensee - Das zweite Gesicht | Christian Theede | Jeanet Pfitzer, Frank Koopmann, Roland Heep | 8.23 | January 9, 2021 | 10 January 2022 |
Hubert Droste is stabbed to death during the annual ghost dance in Bregenz. Just a day before the dance, young Lisa Schwegeling reported “seeing” the exact murder and was sent home. When Lisa has yet another vision of a new murder, the detectives Micha Oberländer and Hannah Zeiler are alarmed, but arrive too late. Why is Lisa having these visions and how are the victims related to her? And most importantly: Can the detectives prevent the next Murder?
| 15 | "Murder by the Lake 15 - Among Wolves" | Die Toten vom Bodensee - Unter Wölfen | Christian Theede | Caroline Draber, Wolfgang Klein | 7.58 | November 1, 2022 | 7 November 2022 |
A wolf has been roaming the forests around Lake Constance for some time now, calling hunters and animal rights activists alike to the scene. When forestry worker Oliver Schlösser finds a dead hunter impaled in an old wolf trap detectives Micha Oberländer and Hannah Zeiler are called to the crime scene. Everyone seems to be connected to everything else, but who is wolf and who is just a lamb? In order to solve the case, Zeiler and Oberländer have to dig deep.
| 16 | "Murder by the Lake 16 - Nemesis" | Die Toten vom Bodensee - Nemesis | Michael Schneider | Mathias Schnelting | 7.69 | February 5, 2023 | 5 February 2023 |
After Hannah Zeiler has not yet returned from her motorcycle vacation, Micha Oberländer has to deal with Austrian Inspector Luisa Hoffmann and at the same time investigate the intimate web of an only seemingly conventional family. A man's lifeless body is found in the woods near Lake Constance, posing a sinister mystery for the duo. Photos of the family of Professor Lambeck, head of the psychiatric clinic at Lake Constance, are found in the makeshift quarters of the dead man, with the eyes of each family member gouged out.
| 17 | "Murder by the Lake 17 - The Night Demon" | Die Toten vom Bodensee - Der Nachtalb | Michael Schneider | Jeanet Pfitzer, Frank Koopmann, Roland Heep | 6.461 | September 17, 2023 | 9 October 2023 |
When Oberländer, plagued by headaches, nightmares and memory lapses, arrives at the crime scene on a lonely country road in the morning, he fails to tell colleagues Komlatschek and Hoffmann that he has a vague memory of the victim. The man was run over. Missing skid marks indicate the intent to kill. The victim and his girlfriend had come to Lake Constance to buy a sailboat. On the night of the murder, the sale was supposed to take place in a restaurant, but the seller did not show up. Oberländer remembers being at the same restaurant that night as well, but his memory lapses give him further puzzles until he thinks of a terrible suspicion...
| 18 | "Murder by the Lake 18 - Breathless" | Die Toten vom Bodensee - Atemlos | Michael Schneider | Jeanet Pfitzer, Frank Koopmann, Roland Heep | 7.207 | January 2, 2024 | 15 January 2024 |
Three days after her disappearance, Daria Ballhofer’s lifeless body is found in Lake Constance - all signs point to murder. Daria's mother Marlene and her sister Sina suspect Daria's husband Victor who shows more interest in setting a new record in free diving, than in grieving his dead wife. What was the real state of their marriage? Why was Daria suddenly possessed by the spirits of Lake Constance right before her death? To solve the case, Luisa Hoffmann and Micha Oberländer dive deep into the fascinating world of free diving, where absolute tranquility and acute danger to life lie close together.
| 19 | "Murder by the Lake 19 - The Messias" | Die Toten vom Bodensee - Die Messias | Michael Schneider | Jeanet Pfitzer, Frank Koopmann, Roland Heep | 6.929 | February 25, 2024 | 4 March 2024 |
Jana Wenzel finds her husband Christoph strangled. Missing from the murdered man's secret collection of instruments is a Stradivarius that has been lost for decades: the "Messias". The dead man was a customer of a fence ring whose convicted leader Antonio Zübert is free again and seeking revenge? The undercover investigator into the ring back then was none other than Luisa Hoffmann, who suddenly finds herself confronted with her past and now fears for her life.
| 20 | "Murder by the Lake 20 - Nightshadow" | Die Toten vom Bodensee - Nachtschatten | Michael Schneider | Jeanet Pfitzer, Frank Koopmann, Roland Heep | 6.294 | December 30, 2024 | 30 December 2024 |
The night after a reading of her husband’s latest novel, Emily Fetscher finds his body, bestselling author Sasha Fetscher, stabbed to death in his bed at Villa Berg. When the murder weapon is quickly found at Sasha Fetscher's mistress’ Henriette Trautschke’s home, the case seems already solved for Oberländer and Hoffmann. But then forensic pathologist Thomas Egger makes a strange discovery during the autopsy of the body: the author was already dead when he was stabbed. Oberländer and Hoffmann gain a deep insight into the history of the mysterious Villa Berg and into the secretive world of a bestselling author, in which there seem to be more suspects than clues.
| 21 | "Murder by the Lake 21 - The Medusa" | Die Toten vom Bodensee - Die Medusa | Patricia Frey | Jeanet Pfitzer, Frank Koopmann, Roland Heep | 7,777 | January 13, 2025 | 13 January 2025 |
The body of a young woman, Vera Grimm, (Victoria Hauer) washes up on the shores of Lake Constance bringing Micha Oberländer and Luisa Hoffmann to the scene. Forensic pathologist Egger (Stefan Pohl) coincidentally saw the young woman on the morning of her death with a little boy, who is now missing. When the detectives visit the murdered woman's sister, it quickly becomes clear that the father of the family, Andy Löffler (Andreas Kiendl), has been caught up in his criminal past. The missing boy is his son Augustin, who was kidnapped by one of his father's accomplices in order to trade him for the stolen "Medusa", a fine gold bust worth millions.
| 22 | "Murder by the Lake 22 - The Ghost Ship" | Die Toten vom Bodensee - Das Geisterschiff | Patricia Frey | Jeanet Pfitzer, Frank Koopmann, Roland Heep | 6.804 | May 18, 2025 | 19 May 2025 |
For fisherwoman Victoria Ludolf (Magdalena Kronschläger), it seems like a scene from a horror movie when a decaying boat drifts towards her in the middle of Lake Constance. On board is the tied up and already skeletonized body of 16-year-old Roman Steingass (Valentin Hagg), who disappeared without a trace 15 years ago. Roman was the main suspect and Oberländer the lead investigator at the time in the murder of teenage Anouk Bergdorf. Oberländer is now once again confronted by the traumatized families of Anouk and Roman. When fisherwoman Ludolf is also found murdered a day later with a piece of rope from the ghost ship in her hand, the case takes a dramatic turn, because now all those involved in the old murder case have become suspects.
| 23 | "Murder by the Lake 23 - The Wishing Tree" | Die Toten vom Bodensee - Der Wunschbaum | Michael Schneider | Jeanet Pfitzer, Frank Koopmann, Roland Heep | 6.643 | October 27, 2025 | 27 October 2025 |
Rebecca Jauer is discovered poisoned and hanged in the regionally famous "wishing tree". But why did the perpetrator display the body so demonstratively in this well-known place of all places? The clues lead to the tree nursery of Saskia Prixner, who had actually granted the dead Rebecca a wish: she had gotten her a job in the company of her brother Stefan Prixner (Julian Looman). That same evening, Saskia is found dead - murdered with the same poison as Rebecca. The detectives have to face a series of murders in the course of which Rebecca's ex-boyfriend Oliver Lorenz (Dominic Oley) also becomes a victim. But where is the connection that leads to the perpetrator?
| 24 | "Murder by the Lake 24 - Wheel of fate" | Die Toten vom Bodensee - Schicksalsrad | Patricia Frey | Jeanet Pfitzer, Frank Koopmann, Roland Heep | 6.108 | January 12, 2026 | 13 April 2026 |
Micha Oberländer and his new colleague Mara Eisler are just starting to warm up to each other when they are called to the local fairgrounds, where the 19-year-old Lorena has been found stabbed to death in a gondola of the Ferris wheel. The fairground workers claim not to have known the deceased and no one heard or saw anything. But through Lorena's school, the investigators learn that Lorena had been living with the troupe since she illegally immigrated from Armenia two years ago. When Oberländer and Eisler find out that Lorena was pregnant, but her boyfriend Gino is not the father of the child, the dysfunctional community's web of lies slowly unravels and everyone seems to have a motive for murder. Who is the father of her child? And what happened on the recent school trip, where all the threads seem to come together? Oberländer and Eisler must work together to decipher the murky fairground world with its very own rules in order to prevent another murder.
| 25 | "Murder by the Lake 25 - Shadow World" | Die Toten vom Bodensee - Im Schattenreich | Michael Schneider | Jeanet Pfitzer, Frank Koopmann, Roland Heep | tba | tba | tba |
While chasing a suspect through the forest, Inspector Micha Oberländer is injured so severely that he falls into a coma. When his colleagues Mara Eisler and Thomas Komlatschek discover the body of a tourist close to where Oberländer was found, they are certain Oberländer must have been pursuing a hot lead in their current case involving the death of a local priest. Oberländer's last notes and the shared past of the two murder victims lead Eisler and Komlatschek to an abandoned orphanage for difficult children that was closed 20 years ago due to abuse allegations. A world of fear, oppression and loneliness is revealed. What tragic events took place here back then and how are they connected to the mysterious chess notations left on the walls of the abandoned building? While Komlatschek and Eisler fear for Oberländer's survival, Oberländer investigates in the dreamlike shadow world of his coma. But the closer he gets to the identity of the perpetrator, the further he is drawn into the darkness. Will Oberländer be able to fight his way back to life? Can Eisler and Komlatschek identify the perpetrator in time without Oberländer's help and prevent another revenge killing?
| 26 | "Murder by the Lake 26 - Heaven's Child" | Die Toten vom Bodensee - Himmelskind | Michael Schneider | Jeanet Pfitzer, Frank Koopmann, Roland Heep | tba | tba | tba |
Bearing unusual signs of torture, the brutally murdered body of retired police officer Breuer is found at a mystical ruin. The crime scene and the unusual murder weapon - a dagger with a sun symbol on its handle - lead investigators Oberländer and Eisler back to the tragic end of the “Heaven’s realm” cult, in which 20 members participated in a gruesome mass suicide at the exact same place during a solar eclipse twenty years ago. Why now? The dubious journalist Liebertz has information about survivors, making him a valuable helper to the investigators, but at the same time qualifying him as a suspect. When a young woman, who as a small child was supposed to have been sacrificed as the “Heaven’s child” in the suicide ritual is kidnapped, Oberländer and Eisler must assume that fanatical cult members now want to complete the ritual during the upcoming solar eclipse. A nerve-wracking race against time to save the woman and prevent any further victims starts.

== Reception ==
=== Critical response ===
The Frankfurter Neue Presse described the first film as a promising debut of a new crime series on ZDF. Not only are the two investigators convincing, but the story about apparent ritual murder provides a scary, wonderful TV-experience as well. About the third film Murder by the Lake 3 - The Sleepwalker the German magazine Focus said, that it offers a solid and exciting entertainment because story and characters are digging deep. The director Andreas Linke and the author Timo Berndt manage perfectly to show the bubbling underneath the surface. According to rtv Hannu Salonen, the director of the fourth film, pleases in Murder by the Lake 4 - Till Death do them Part with calm storytelling and unmistakable intuition for strong pictures. In this film the main actors Matthias Koeberlin and Nora Waldstätten can convince as a well balanced team with sharp dialog as well. In the online magazine tittelbach the critic Tilmann P. Gangloff named the upcoming sixth film Murder by the Lake 6 - The Return from the director Hannu Salonen the best film of the series so far. Beside the suspenseful story the film convinces because of its Scandinavian art work and cinematography.
