= Knockin' on Heaven's Door (1997 film) =

1997 German crime comedy film

- Theatrical release poster
- Directed by: Thomas Jahn; Til Schweiger (uncredited)
- Written by: Thomas Jahn; Til Schweiger
- Produced by: Til Schweiger; Thomas Zickler; André Hennicke
- Starring: Til Schweiger; Jan Josef Liefers; Moritz Bleibtreu; Thierry Van Werveke; Huub Stapel; Rutger Hauer; Hannes Jaenicke; Ralph Herforth
- Cinematography: Gero Steffen
- Edited by: Alexander Berner
- Music by: Franz Plasa
- Production companies: Mr. Brown Entertainment; Buena Vista International Filmproduktion (Germany)
- Distributed by: Buena Vista International (Note: Distributed under the Touchstone Pictures banner.)
- Release date: 20 February 1997
- Running time: 86 minutes
- Country: Germany
- Language: German
- Budget: 3,500,000 DM
- Box office: $23.8 million

Knockin' on Heaven's Door is a 1997 German crime tragicomedy film by Thomas Jahn, starring Til Schweiger, Moritz Bleibtreu, Jan Josef Liefers and Rutger Hauer. Its name derives from the Bob Dylan song which is also on the film's soundtrack. It was entered into the 20th Moscow International Film Festival where Schweiger won the Silver St. George for Best Actor.

The story revolves around two hospital patients with terminal diseases who befriend each other. Wishing to see the sea before it is too late for them, they steal a roadster and start their quest.

== Plot ==
Two patients (Martin Brest and Rudi Wurlitzer) meet in a hospital, just after learning that both have untreatable diseases with short life expectancies. They start talking about their death that is to come very soon. When they find a bottle of tequila, Martin learns that Rudi has never seen the sea. Martin tells Rudi that all they talk about in heaven is how beautiful the sea is.

Drunk and still in their pajamas, they steal a baby blue Mercedes-Benz W113 classic roadster and embark on their last mission - to see the sea. The car belongs to a crime boss. They find a gun in the glove compartment and use it to rob several small shops along the way, only to find that there is a million deutsche marks in cash in the trunk of their car.

As they progress closer to their destination, they are pursued by both the police and the gangsters. Eventually, the two find themselves trapped on a remote country road blocked by police units on one side and gangsters on the other, pointing their guns at each other. The stand-off finally erupts into a big shoot-out while the two make a desperate escape through a corn field.

After that, Martin buys a pink Cadillac of the same model as the one which Elvis Presley gifted to his mother. His wish is to give the same present to his own mother. As he fulfills the wish, they get ambushed by police near Martin's mother's house. Martin pretends to have a seizure and falls on the ground. He is taken to the hospital in an ambulance with Rudi sitting by his side.

En route, Martin and Rudi hijack the vehicle to continue their quest. On the way to the ocean they stop by a brothel, where Rudi wants to fulfil his wish to have sex with two women at the same time. By coincidence, the brothel is owned by the boss whose money they had found in the car they stole at the beginning of the journey. They are spotted by the two gangsters who were after them throughout their journey. The gangsters take Rudi and Martin to their boss who demands his money back. Martin says that the money has been spent and mailed to random recipients, which drives the criminal boss insane. Enraged, the boss points a gun at them ready to shoot, but Curtiz, the top-dog criminal to whom the money was meant to be delivered, joins the scene. Having listened briefly to their story, he says "Then you better run, before you run out of time."

The film ends as Martin and Rudi arrive at the ocean's shore. They walk to the sandy beach and Martin falls dead on the ground. Rudi imperturbably sits down beside his friend, facing the ocean and watching the surf.

== Cast ==
- Til Schweiger as Martin Brest
- Jan Josef Liefers as Rudi Wurlitzer
- Thierry Van Werveke as Henk, The Belgian
- Moritz Bleibtreu as Abdul, The Turk
- Huub Stapel as Frankie "Boy" Beluga
- Leonard Lansink as Kommissar Schneider
- Ralph Herforth as Assistant Keller
- Cornelia Froboess as Frau Brest, Martin's Mother
- Rutger Hauer as Curtiz
- Christiane Paul as Shop Assistant In A Boutique
- Xenia Seeberg as Policewoman

== Reception ==
The film opened on 522 screens in Germany and opened at number one at the box office with a gross of $3,035,034 for the four-day weekend. It was the fifth highest-grossing film of the year in Germany (and the highest-grossing German film) with a gross of $21,288,865. Worldwide, it grossed $23.8 million.

== Remake ==
A Japanese remake was announced to be released in February 2009 under the title Heaven's Door (directed by Michael Arias and with music by Plaid). In contrast to the original, the protagonists in the remake are a 28-year-old young man and a 14-year-old girl.

== See also ==
- Hawks, a 1988 film with a similar plot
- The Bucket List, a 2007 film with a similar plot
