= Prix Romy Schneider =

French acting award

The Prix Romy Schneider (Romy Schneider Award) is awarded annually to a young and upcoming actress working in the French film industry.

It was initiated in 1984 by the French journalists Marlène and Eugène Molineau and is named after the actress Romy Schneider (1938–1982). The prize is awarded by a jury each year in Paris in conjunction with its male counterpart, the Prix Patrick Dewaere (until 2006 the Prix Jean Gabin).

== Recipients ==
In 1994, the German actress Sandra Speichert was the first non-French – and so far the only German – recipient. The youngest recipient was Vanessa Paradis (17 years old in 1990), the oldest Marie-Josée Croze (40 years old in 2010).

Year	Recipient(s)	Nationality
1984	Christine Boisson	France
1985	Élizabeth Bourgine	France
1986	Juliette Binoche	France
1987	Catherine Mouchet	France
1988	Fanny Bastien	France
1989	Mathilda May	France
1990	Vanessa Paradis	France
1991	Anne Brochet	France
1992	Anouk Grinberg	France
1993	Elsa Zylberstein	France
1994	Sandra Speichert	Germany
1995	Sandrine Kiberlain	France
1996	Marie Gillain	Belgium
1997	Julie Gayet	France
1998	Isabelle Carré	France
1999	Mathilde Seigner	France
2000	Clotilde Courau	France
2001	Hélène de Fougerolles	France
2002	Emma de Caunes	France
2003	Ludivine Sagnier	France
2004	Laura Smet	France
2005	Cécile de France	Belgium
2006	Mélanie Laurent	France
2007	not awarded	
2008	Audrey Dana	France
2009	Déborah François	Belgium
2010	Marie-Josée Croze	Canada
2011	Anaïs Demoustier	France
2012	Bérénice Bejo	Argentina; France
2013	Céline Sallette	France
2014	Adèle Exarchopoulos	France
2015	Adèle Haenel	France
2016	Lou de Laâge	France
2017	not awarded	
2018	Adeline d'Hermy	France
2019	Diane Rouxel	France
