= Professor T. (Belgian TV series) =

Belgian Dutch-language crime drama TV series

- Professor T. DVD box cover
- Genre: Crime drama Police procedural
- Country of origin: Belgium
- Original language: Flemish
- No. of seasons: 3
- No. of episodes: 39

Original release
- Network: Eén
- Release: 2015 – 2018

Related
- Professor T. (German TV series); Professor T. (British TV series); Prof T. (French TV series); Professor T. (Czech TV series)

Professor T. is Flemish-language TV series from Belgium, a drama about an eccentric professor at the University of Antwerp. Professor Jasper Teerlinck, a.k.a. Professor T, is a professor of criminology. Annelies Donckers, a former student of his who has become an inspector of the Federal Judicial Police, regularly summons the help of her former professor as a consultant. The show lasted for three seasons, released in 2015, 2016 and 2018. The producers, Skyline Entertainment, announced that the third season would be its last.

== Series filmmaking ==
Series filmmaking includes elements of development, pre-production, aspects of the actual film, audio, and effects production, post-production additions and changes, and the work's eventual distribution.

=== Development ===
The ideation, writing, and financing are elements of series' development.

=== Pre-production ===
Pre-production includes location scouting, set production, above- and below-line casting and crew hiring, and other preparatory work before shooting begins.

=== Production ===
This stage includes principal photography, musical production, and other aspects of actual production of the visual and audio elements of the work, including visual, sound, and special effects.

=== Post-production ===
The combination of filmed images, recorded sound, and film effects (visual, special, etc.) and their editing into a finished product occur during post-production.

=== Distribution ===
Eventual arrangement for the work's distribution is made during the distribution stage.

In the UK, all three seasons were available on Channel 4's catchup service All 4, as part of its Walter Presents strand from the end of 2018. In the US, the first season began to air 2 May 2019, on PBS stations and became available as part of the PBS Passport program.

== Cast ==
- Koen De Bouw as Jasper Teerlinck, Professor T
- Tanja Oostvogels as Commissioner Christina Flamant
- Herwig Ilegems as Chief Inspector Paul Rabet
- Ella Leyers as Inspector Annelies Donckers (season 1–2)
- Bart Hollanders as Inspector Daan De Winter (season 1–2)
- Steve Geerts as Inspector John Van Humbeeck (season 2–3)
- Leen Roels as Inspector Saskia Vogels (season 3)
- Carry Goossens as Walter De Paepe, Dean at the University
- Goele Derick as Ingrid Sneyers, Secretary of the faculty
- Gene Bervoets as Herman Donckers, Annelies Donckers' father (season 1–2)
- Viviane de Muynck as Adelinde Van Marcke, Professor T's mother
- Eric Godon as Commissioner Cedric Fouchet (season 1)
- Ignace Paepe as Thierry Bulthé (season 1)
- Barbara Sarafian as Psychiatrist Helena Gijselbrecht (season 2–3)
- Tom Van Bauwel as Professor Vanderweyden (season 2–3)
- Kristof Coenen as Serge Lauwers, head of the Federal Drugs Division (season 2)

== Episodes ==
=== Season 1 ===
1. Campus Drie Eiken (Three Oaks Campus(nl)) - Inspector Donckers thinks her old Professor of Criminology might help with a difficult rape case. Problem is, Professor Teerlinck is a bit odd, suffering from OCD, and with a tendency towards unfiltered statements of exactly what he thinks.
2. Een fatale vergissing (A Fatal Mistake) - After the head librarian of the university is poisoned, the police begin to think the wrong person might have been killed.
3. De doorlichting (The Inspection) - When the inspector of a school-evaluation team is murdered at home it initially looks like a robbery gone wrong, but Annelies Donckers thinks there is more to it.
4. Dubbelleven (Double Life) - When a first year law student disappears without a trace, it appears to be an act of despair. But his large bank account and his simple origin don't match up.
5. De hotelmoord (The Hotel Murder) - Hendrik Marsboom, a renowned plastic surgeon, is found murdered in a hotel room, and the woman who was with him has disappeared. When the police finally find her, they believe her jealous husband might know more than he's admitting.
6. Tamara (Tamara) - A call-girl is found hanged in her apartment, an apparent suicide. But it soon discovered to be murder staged to look like suicide.
7. De maskermoorden (The Mask Murders) - The murder of a man and his wife appears to be an exact copy of a murder ten years ago. Problem is—the man convicted of that murder is still behind bars.
8. Katvanger (The Go-Between) - The double murder of a drug dealer and his lover during the evening rush hour is initially believed to be a pay-off.
9. Moederliefde (Motherly Love) - An au pair returns home after an evening off, only to find her employer unconscious in the living room and her charge, his six year old son, vanished.
10. De zaak Seynaeve (The Trial) - Professor T is convinced that a man on trial for murdering his employer is innocent, despite the fact that the man was found at the scene, holding the murder weapon.
11. De nalatenschap (The Legacy) - After a hit on a prominent businessman fails, a second attempt appears to have been successful. A lot of blood is discovered in his living-room, where there appears to have been a fight, but there is no body. Jasper deducts things were staged by Verhulst himself, but then he is found—dead.
12. De jaartalmoorden deel 1 (Murder by the Numbers, Part 1) - A serial killer appears to be on the loose when two victims are found dead within 24 hours, strangled, with a scorched face, and a date, different in each case, carved into their chests.
13. De jaartalmoorden deel 2 (Murder by the Numbers, Part 2) - While De Winter is in the hospital, fighting for his life after the killer shot him, the police try to find connections between the victims, having still no clues about the killer.

=== Season 2 ===
1. Cuberdon (Cuberdon) - Despite Psychiatrist Gijselbrecht's belief that, after only six months, he isn't ready, Professor T. leaves the institution. Inspector De Winter discovers that doing police work from a wheelchair isn't easy when he and Annelis Donckers investigate a number of strange deaths, which initially don't seem connected.
2. In vuur en vlam (Ablaze) - Professor T helps with the investigation of a fire in a student flat which gravely injured the tenant. He is also challenged by Doctor Gijselbrecht to take public transport by himself. Rabet's son-in-law, Jurgen, returns from India, demanding custody of Rabet's granddaughter.
3. De familie (The Family) - The police investigate a tragic family drama, involving the murder of an eminent oncologist. With Professor T suspended, Professor Vanderweyden delivers his lectures.
4. Onvoltooid Verleden (Past Imperfect) - The police investigate a number of instances of vandalism of SUVs where pamphlets were left. The attacks are modeled on attacks made by an anarchistic student group in the 80's. To everybody's surprise, Jasper was a member of that group. Inspector John Van Humbeeck is Annelies's new partner.
5. Hartstocht (Of Passion) - After two doctors are murdered in a similar way, the police fear there will be more killings, and look for a connection between the two victims. Jasper is relieved his suspension is finally at an end. Rabet loses custody of his granddaughter and loses control.
6. Diamant (Diamond) - When a jeweler is run down in the street, after he crosses in a hurry, he is found to be carrying a collection of very valuable diamonds. The police suspect there is more to the case than a simple accident and visit his family. After a painful accident in a public swimming pool, another of Doctor Gijselbrecht's tasks, Jasper ends up in the hospital.
7. Jitske (Jitske) - The investigation of the murder of a woman is complicated when her 17-year-old daughter, who has Down Syndrome, says she knows who murdered her mother, but doesn't want to say who it is.
8. Angstig gehecht (Attachment Issues) - The team's investigation of a strange traffic accident, where the victim was found dead more than 100 meters from her car, is complicated when Jasper has to split his attention between the case and a very strange assignment from his psychiatrist: he must make a list of qualities about his mother.
9. Het congres (The Conference) - Professor T is bewildered when he discovers he is not the opening speaker at The University of Antwerp's yearly congress of criminologists. When the speaker scheduled to be the opening lecturer is killed, all eyes turn on the professor.
10. Het DNA van een moordenaar (The DNA of a Murderer) - When the witness of a murder twelve years ago is now himself murdered, the son of the convicted murderer is the prime suspect. Jasper is worried about Christina and her new boyfriend Serge, whom he doesn't trust. Annelies has to make the most difficult decision of her life.
11. Dode meisjes zingen niet (Dead Girls Don't Sing) - A Catholic schoolgirl is found murdered in her dorm room.
12. Zwanenzang deel 1 (Swansong, Part 1) - An undercover agent involved in the investigation of a prominent drug lord is found dead in the trunk of his car. It's Professor T's birthday, and the Professor, who hates birthdays, is acting more oddly than usual.
13. Zwanenzang deel 2 (Swansong, Part 2) - The team is closing in on the drug lord, when John is surprised to discover that Rabet is working with him.

=== Season 3 ===
1. De troonopvolger deel 1 (Heir to the Throne, Part 1) - Professor T is imprisoned after shooting and killing a police inspector in cold blood.
2. De troonopvolger deel 2 (Heir to the Throne, Part 2) - Professor T receives help from an unlikely source when his situation in jail worsens.
3. Het verloren schaap (The Lost Sheep) - Professor T is asked to assist in the investigation of the escape of one of his fellow prisoners.
4. Het perfecte plaatje (The Perfect Picture) - After a bride is found drowned the morning after her wedding, Professor T is brought in to help with the investigation. A hearing is held to decide whether Professor T will be released from custody while awaiting his murder trial.
5. Sugarbaby (Sugarbaby) - The police investigate the murder of a first-year law student whom they discover was supporting herself by working as a prostitute.
6. Elk huisje... (Every Home) - At first sight, a man found dead at the side of the road appears to be the victim of a hit and run, but the police soon have their doubts.
7. Het geluk van anderen (Other People's Happiness) - A prison guard with a bad reputation is found dead in the showers. Not surprisingly, there is a whole prisonful of suspects.
8. Moord op voorschrift (Murder on Prescription) - A successful mystery novelist has committed suicide, in a manner he described in one of his books, which causes the police to have their doubts that it was a suicide.
9. Het vluchtmisbedrijf (The Hit and Run) - Professor T's replacement at the university is the victim of a hit-and-run while riding his bike and rumor has it that Professor T is involved.
10. Residentie Zilverspar (Zilverspar Residence) - A visitor to a pensioners home is killed in an unfortunate accident by a resident suffering from dementia, but the police soon have their doubts that that's what happened. Professor T continues his investigation into his father's suicide.
11. Dakloos (Homeless) - Just before he dies, a victim of an accident, a homeless man, confesses to a murder. Professor T discovers his mother's journals, and their surprising contents.
12. Queen Olivia (Queen Olivia) - A young woman is killed and dumped overboard while on a pleasure cruise on a luxury yacht. Christina Flamant helps Professor T obtain the police file on his father's death.
13. De ontknoping (The Denouement) - While police pursue the reopened cold case of Professor T's father's apparent suicide, Doctor Gijselbrecht helps Professor T explore his subconscious to finally get to the truth.

== Remakes ==
The series was remade in Germany with the same title, Professor T. There is a French remake as well, called Prof T. There is also a Czech remake.

In 2021, a UK remake also named Professor T. debuted on Britbox and ITV. It premiered in the US on PBS on 25 July 2021.
