= Faster Than Fear =

2022 German TV series

- German: Schneller als die Angst
- Genre: Drama
- Screenplay by: Klaus Arriens und Thomas Wilke
- Directed by: Florian Baxmeyer
- Starring: Friederike Becht; Christoph Letkowski; Felix Klare; Andreas Döhler; Thomas Loibl; Oleg Tikhomirov; Lisa Hrdina; Golo Euler; Stephanie Japp; Carina Wiese; Sarah Bauerett
- Country of origin: Germany
- Original language: German
- No. of seasons: 1
- No. of episodes: 6

Production
- Producers: Sam Davis; Kim Fatheuer
- Camera setup: Multi-camera
- Production company: Rowboat Film

Original release
- Network: Das Erste
- Release: January 1, 2022 – present

Faster Than Fear (German: Schneller als die Angst) is a 2022 German TV series directed by Florian Baxmeyer. It's based on an original idea from Klaus Arriens and Thomas Wilke who also wrote the scripts for all six episodes.

== Plot ==
Sunny is a tough cop, but lately she hasn't been quite herself. After a six-week absence, she is back on duty, right back on a hard case. André Haffner has escaped the prison and nobody knows how. He must have had help – on the inside and out. One thing is for sure: he will kill again – and his victims are women. Sunny is eager to take the lead, but her superiors give that to her colleague and send her to therapy. Sunny has a secret reason for her absence: she was assaulted and has no idea by whom. Even though her male colleagues and her partner Alex support her, she doesn't trust them fully. Suspicion has become her second nature and when Sunny finds out who may have attacked her, she wages a proxy war with the hunt for Haffner, revealing more parallels between them than she would like.

== Cast ==
- Friederike Becht: Sonja "Sunny" Becker
- Christoph Letkowski: Markus Fechner
- Felix Klare: André Haffner
- Andreas Döhler: Torsten Wächter
- Thomas Loibl: Ralf Keller
- Oleg Tikhomirov: Jakub "Kuba" Kasakow
- Lisa Hrdina: Johanna Delling
- Golo Euler: Alex Reuter
- Stephanie Japp: Julia Keller
- Carina Wiese: Barbara Zellmann
- Sarah Bauerett: Nora Belling
- Hannah Ehrlichmann: Tina Kullmann
- Anton Weil: Steffen Heuss
- Steffen Münster: Babsy
- Hilke Altefrohne: Eva Bergedorf
- Fred Costea: Patient
- Robert Maaser: Daniel Bayer
- Jasmin Bartels: Jennifer Bayer
- Anton Dreger: Tim Gebhardt
- Anni Nagel: Pia Jenrich
- Paul Kupetz: Kollege

== Production ==
The first season was shot between August 4, 2020, and October 30, 2020, in Magdeburg and Berlin.

The series was broadcast in double episodes on January 1, January 2, and January 9, 2022, on Das Erste in late prime. It was first published on the streaming platform of ARD on December 30, 2021.

== Reception ==
Faster Than Fear got positive reviews overall. Joachim Huber for Tagesspiegel mentioned that the series is "a must for an every series fan". He praised the crew and the entire ensemble for celebrating the art of television through the series.

The Weser-Kurier enjoys the complex characters who are exposed layer by layer over the course of the script.

The Frankfurter Allgemeine Zeitung on the other hand, criticizes the introduction of the characters, but states that the series finally comes into its own in the second episode.

Tilmann P. Gangloff for Tittelbach.tv wrote that the twisty und exciting plot enfolds on two levels: the crumbling network of relationships on one hand and the cat-and-mouse-game-like hunt for serial killer on the other, which both escalate eventually.
