= Romy (TV award) =

Austrian television award

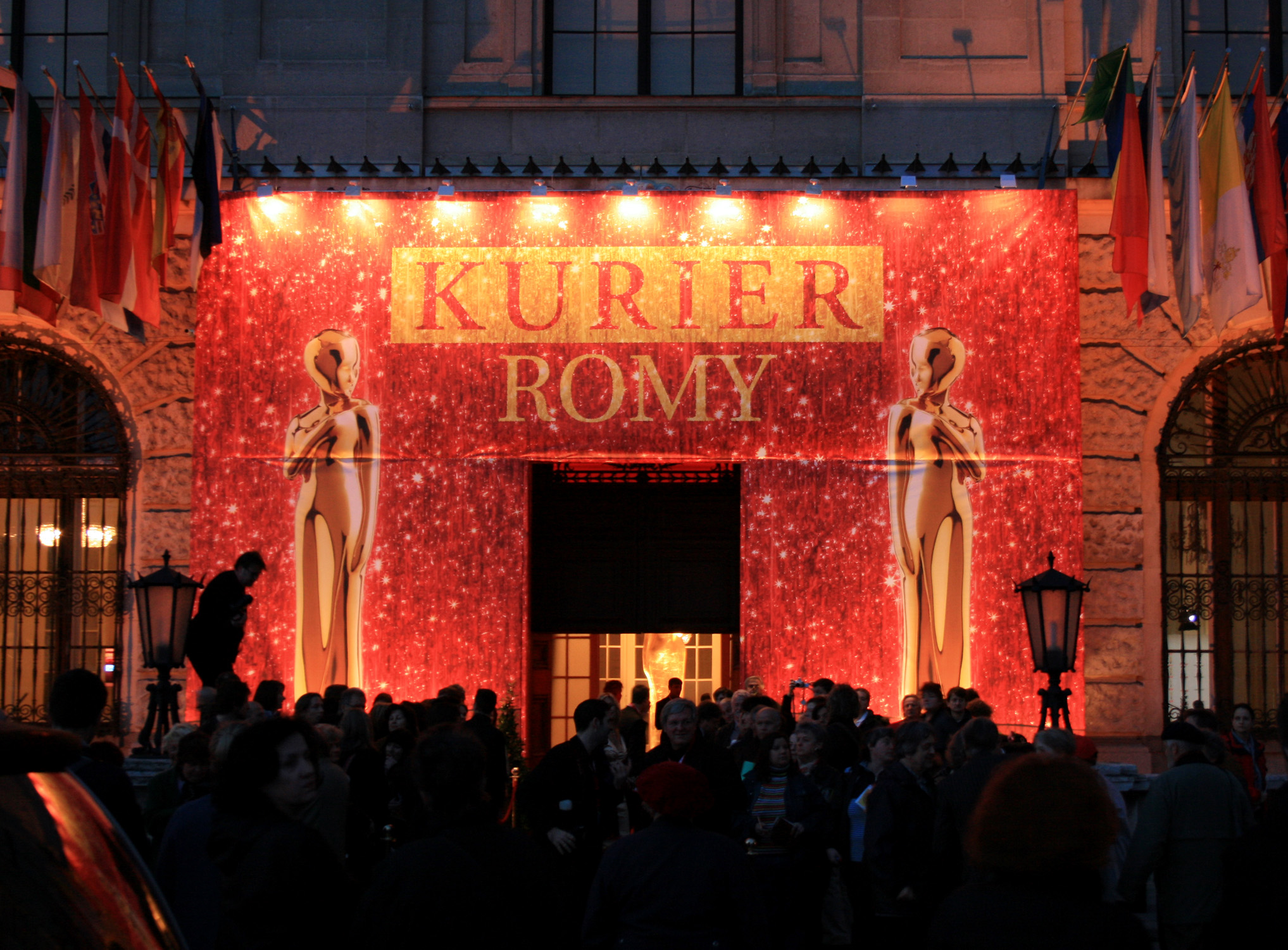
Entrance to the 2008 Romy Awards

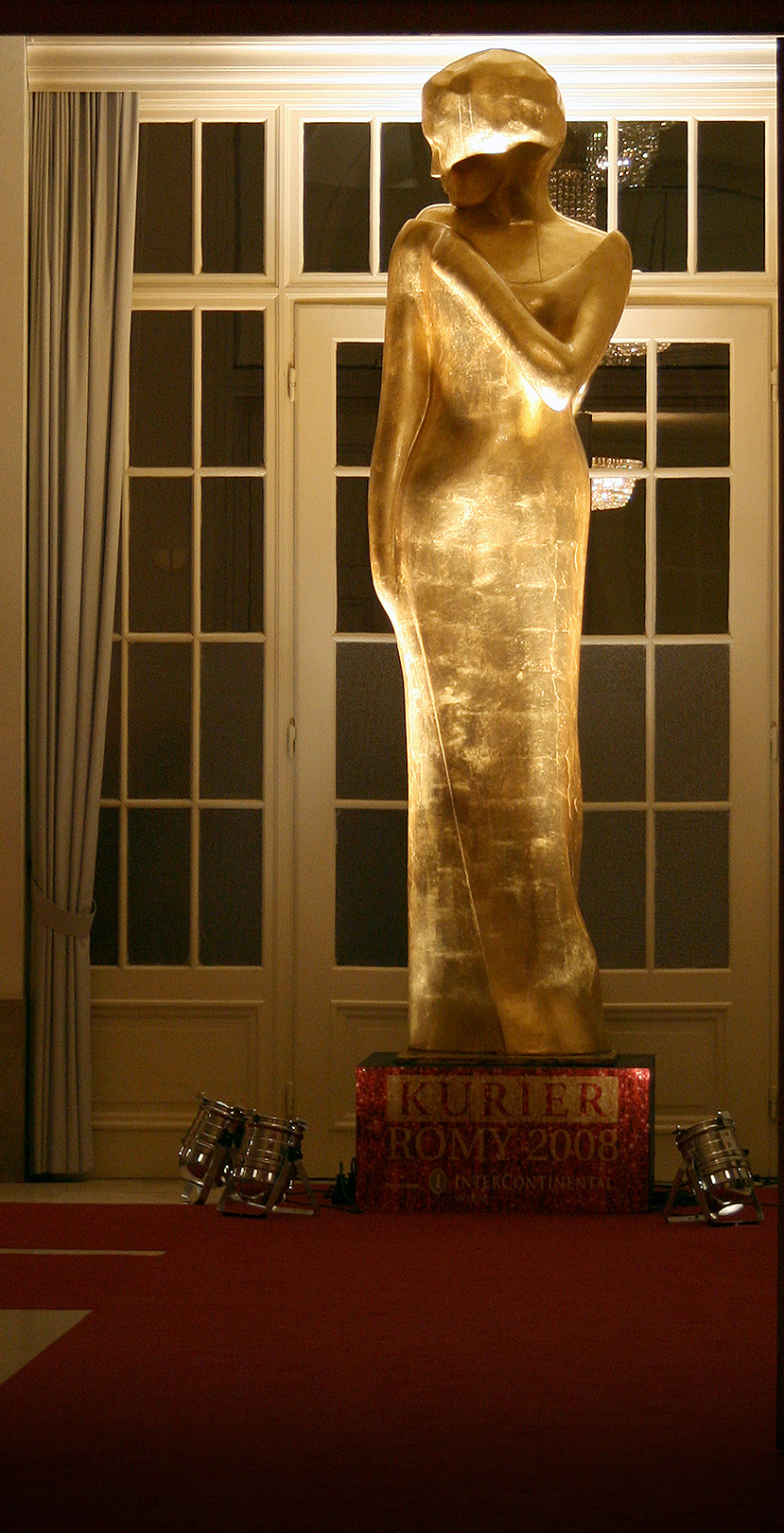
Enlarged statue of the trophy

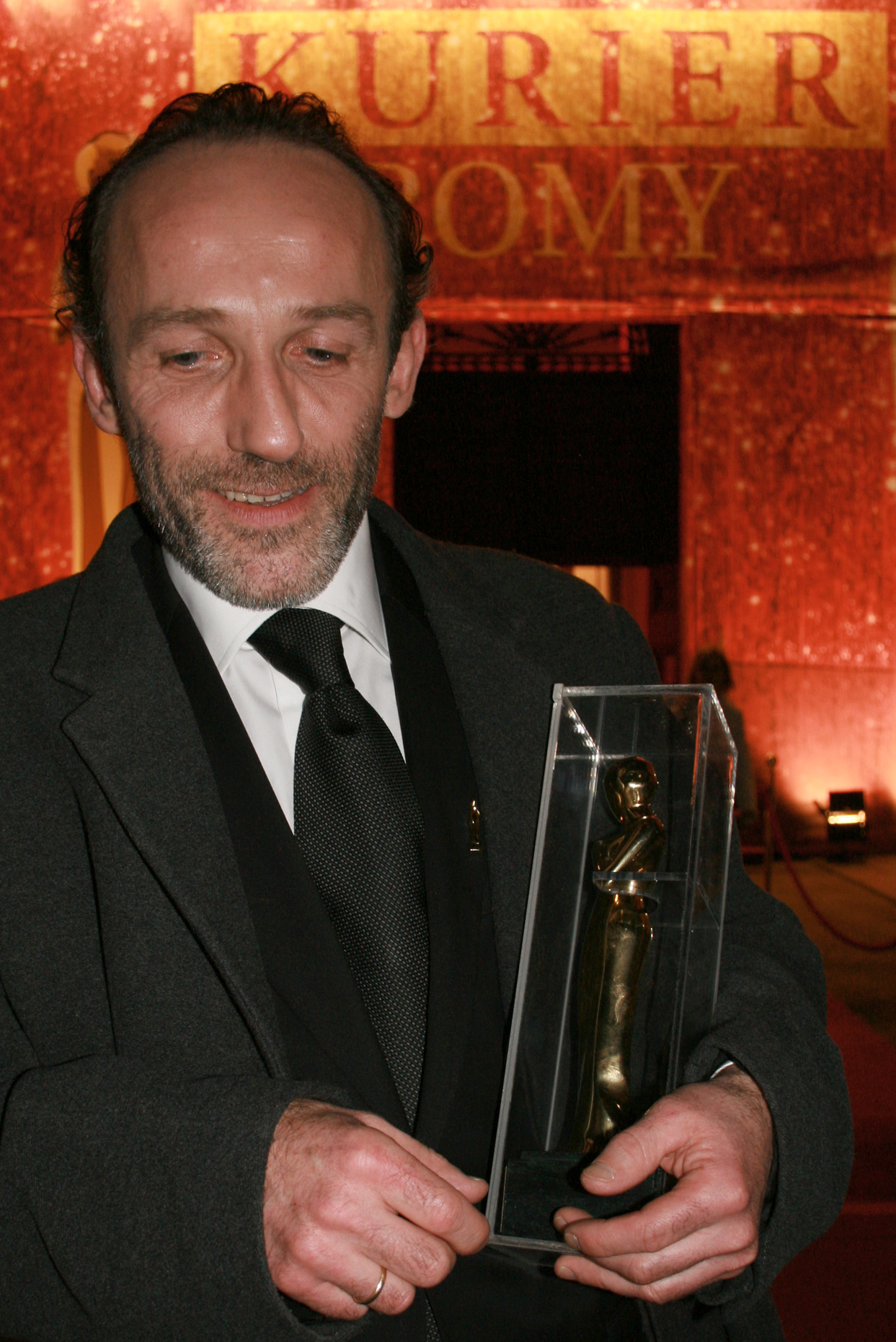
Karl Markovics: Most Popular Actor 2007 and 2008

The Romy television award in honor of the German-born and naturalized French actress Romy Schneider, born in Vienna, was created in 1990 by the Austrian newspaper Kurier – or rather their movie reviewer Rudolf John, who also designed the 30.5 cm gilded trophy. It recalls a scene from the movie The Swimming Pool with Alain Delon, when Romy Schneider arranges her dress. (See Senta Berger getting the Platinum award in 2007). The award ceremony is conducted at the Hofburg in Vienna.

== Categories ==
Depending on the category, votes are by a jury or by the public.

Public categories

- Beliebteste Schauspielerin (most popular actress)
- Beliebtester Schauspieler (most popular actor)
- Beliebtester Moderator (most popular moderator, male)
- Beliebteste Moderatorin (most popular moderator, female)
- Beliebtester Talk- und Showmaster (most popular talk show host/game show host)
- Beliebtester Seriendarsteller (most popular actor/actress in TV series)
- Beliebtester Kabarettist (most popular cabaret performer/comedian)
- Beliebtester männlicher Shootingstar (most popular shooting star, male)
- Beliebtester weiblicher Shootingstar (most popular shooting star, female)

Jury categories

- Bester Fernsehfilm (best TV movie)
- Beste Fernsehdokumentation (best TV documentary feature)
- Beste Programmidee (best programme idea)
- Bester Produzent (best producer)
- Beste Regie (best director)
- Beste Kamera (best cinematography)
- Bestes Buch (best story)
- Special award
- Platinum (honorary award in appreciation of a life's career)

== Trivia ==
- Most awards received Armin Assinger: 8
- 2004 – Shortest speech of an awarded person: Tobias Moretti, "Danke, Danke, Danke" (Thanks, 3 times). Moretti had 6 awards in all.
- 1998 – Recipient Caterina Valente sang her speech.
- 1995 – Reginald von Ravenhorst got a wooden "Special Award". He is better known as Moretti's partner Rex from Kommissar Rex.
- 1994 – Most romantic moment: Recipient Wolfgang Fierek asked in public his girlfriend Djamila to marry him (she accepted).
- 1992 – Saddest moment: Thomas Pluch died of heart attack seven minutes after obtaining the award for "Best Story". Thereafter the event was cancelled and the other awards were distributed the following year.

== See also ==
- Prix Romy Schneider
