= Thomas Jahn =

German film and television director (born 1965)

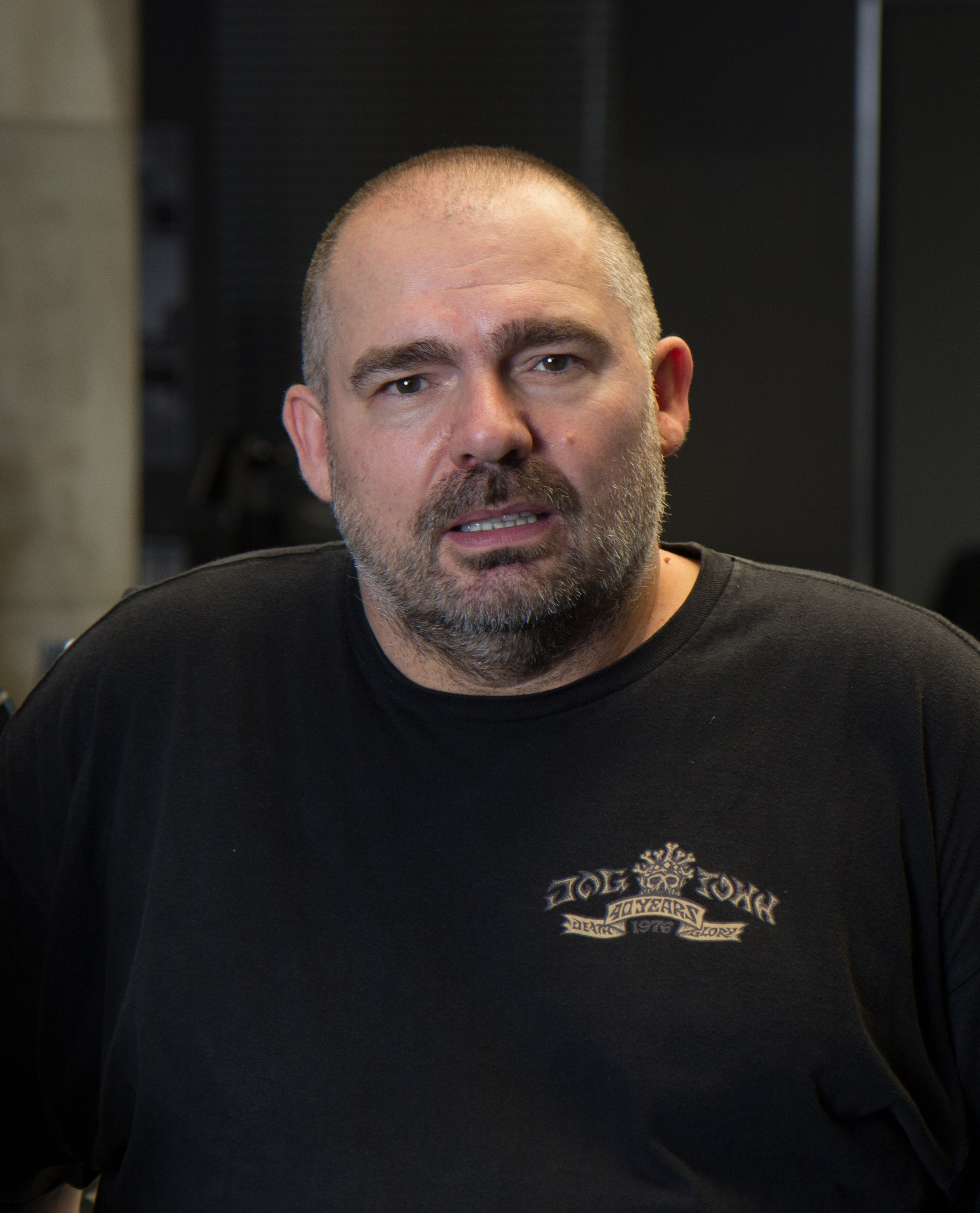
- on the set of the ZDF crime series "Professor T." 2017
- Born: 9 July 1965 (age 61); Hückelhoven, North Rhine-Westphalia, West Germany
- Occupations: Film director, screenwriter
- Years active: 1997–present

Thomas Jahn (born 9 July 1965) is a German film and television director.

== Career ==
Jahn had success with Knockin' on Heaven's Door (1997), which was the highest-grossing German film of the year. Following its success, Warner Bros. signed him to a three-picture deal and rushed Kai Rabe gegen die Vatikankiller (1998) into production, however, the film was not successful at the box office and Warner Bros. cancelled the deal.

== Awards ==
Knockin' on Heaven's Door won the Gran Angular Award for Best Film at the 1997 Sitges - Catalan International Film Festival, and the Audience Award and Grand Prize at the 1998 Valenciennes International Festival of Action and Adventure Films. The film was also entered into the 20th Moscow International Film Festival.

== Filmography ==
=== Feature films ===
- Knockin' on Heaven's Door (1997)
- Kai Rabe gegen die Vatikankiller (1998)
- Auf Herz und Nieren (2001)
- The Lost Samaritan (2008)
- 80 Minutes (2008)
- The Boxer (2009)

=== TV film ===
- Herzbeben – Die Nacht, die alles veränderte (1998)

=== Television series episodes ===
- Tatort
- Der Dicke
- Balko
- Sperling
- Der Kriminalist
- Da kommt Kalle
- SOKO Rhein-Main
- Einsatz in Hamburg
