= Sergej Moya =

German actor, screenwriter and director (born 1987)

- Born: 4 January 1988 (age 38); Prenzlauer Berg, East Berlin, East Germany
- Occupations: actor, screenwriter and director
- Years active: 2001–present

Sergej Moya (born 4 January 1988 in East Berlin) is a German actor, screenwriter and director. He won the Undine Award for Best Young Leading Actor in the 2005 film Keller – Teenage Wasteland.

== Early life ==
Moya was born in Prenzlauer Berg, East Berlin. He went to six different schools including the Berlin State Ballet School, and went to school in the US for half a year in 2005. Moya started his film career during his early teens, while at comprehensive school in Mitte, Berlin. He left school before Grade 10, due to having to travel and stay away for periods of time to make films, such as "The Angel Tonight" in Munich for 14 days in 2006. He received a scholarship from the Berenberg Bank Foundation in 2006 to further his acting development. He went to a workshop at the Stella Adler Studio of Acting in New York.

== Acting career ==
Sergei Moya's first acting role aged 12, was in 2001 in the German movie Female 2 Seeks Happy End with Ben Becker. There followed a small role in the remake of the Erich Kästner 's novel Emil and the Detectives. The acting breakthrough came in 2003 alongside Götz George and Klaus J. Behrendt in the multi-awarded (Emmy and a Grimme Award,) WDR television movie Mein Vater. In 2005, he once again acted beside Götz George in a Schimanski episode.

In the Sat.1 series, he played a case for the Old Fox, as the son of Walter Sittler and then in the ARD series Commissario Laurenti, he was alongside of Henry Hübchen. For his role in Keller - Teenage Wasteland, Moya received the 2006 Undine Award for best actor in a feature film. In 2006, he was next to Uwe Ochsenknecht in Der beste Lehrer der Welt. In 2007, he was nominated for a Golden Romy as "Most Popular Shooting Star". Moya has no degree and has been focusing on acting since the beginning of 2006. He has appeared in several TV series such as Polizeiruf 110, Commissario Laurenti, Der Alte and several Tatort episodes.

== Career as a director and screenwriter ==
He founded a film company, Von Fiessbach Film, with his girlfriend and producer Julia Lischinski, and friend Sascha Pollack.

Since 2009, Moya has also worked as a director and author. His short film Hollywood Drama was part of the competition at the film festival Max Ophüls Preis 2010 and was shown in the Perspektive Deutsches Kino series of the Berlinale 2010. His film project Hotel Desire, an erotic film with Clemens Schick and Saralisa Volm, was funded by crowdfunding. The sum of €170,000 was collected before the official deadline of 80 days. The later found the budget of $241,000 to complete the film.

In 2014, the 26-year-old Moya directed a TV film, about actor Jan Josef Liefers, Jan Josef Liefers - soundtrack of my life on the MDR channel . Tatjana Kerschbaumer noted in Tagesspiegel about the film, "Rarely has it been possible to summarize the biography of a person, music history and politics in such a condensed and anything but tenuous way".

== Awards ==
- 2005 - (Austrian Media Prize) Undine Award for Best Young Leading Actor in the film Keller – Teenage Wasteland
- 2008 - "Best Actor" at the Madrid Mostoles International Film Festival
- 2009 - Moya received the Max Ophüls Award for "Best Newcomer"

== Filmography ==
=== Film ===
Year	Title	Role	Notes
2001	Female 2 Seeks Happy End	ill little boy	
2001	Emil and the Detectives	Flügel	
2005	Out of Hand	Sebastian	also known as Keller - Teenage Wasteland
2006	Der Engel heute Nacht (or "The Angel Tonight")		(Short)
2006	The Cloud	Jannes (credited as Sergej Moja)	
2007	Evil Images	Jonas	(Short)
2008	Kronos. End and Beginning	Kronos	original german title Kronos. Ende und Anfang
2008	Der zweite Bruder	Tobias	(Short)
2009	Jedem das Seine	Milos	
2009	Freunde von früher	Sunny aged 17	also known as Les Amis du passé
2010	Shahada	Daniel	
2017	The Invisibles	Ludwig Lichtwitz	

=== Television ===
Year	Title	Role	Notes
2003	Mein Vater	Oliver Esser	(TV movie)
2003-2013	Tatort (TV series)	Philipp Rabe 2003 / Mika Mende 2007 / Mischa Celinski 2009 / Tobias Rothgerber 2010 / Konstantin 2013	TV series, 5 episodes
2004	Die Farben der Liebe	Alex	(TV movie)
2004-2007	Ein Fall für den Fuchs	Lukas Kerner	TV series, 6 episodes
2005	Schimanski	David	TV series, 1 episode
2005	Im Namen des Gesetzes	Pit Daubler	TV series, 1 episode
2006	Ein Fall für zwei	Tobias von Kleist	TV series, 1 episode
2006	Der beste Lehrer der Welt	Igor	(TV movie)
2006-2009	Commissario Laurenti	Marco Laurenti	TV series, 5 episodes
2007	Der Kriminalist	Sascha Rohrbach	TV series, 1 episode
2007-2012	Polizeiruf 110	Jürgen Baumann	TV series, 2 episodes
2008	Rosa Roth	Sascha Bremer	TV series, 1 episode
2008	Stille Post	Niklas / Andrea's student	(TV movie)
2008-2014	Leipzig Homicide	Sven Kaspari 2008/ Heiko Bender 2014	TV series, 2 episodes
2009	The Old Fox	Markus Fletzinger	TV series, 1 episode
2010	Des Kaisers neue Kleider	Jakob	(TV movie)
2010	Lutter (TV series)	Lukas Taschenbeck	TV series, 1 episode
2011	Fugitives	Frank Korbach	TV series, 2 episodes
2012	Der Dicke	Björn Matuschek	TV series, 1 episode
2012	Cologne P.D.	Mick Gebert	TV series, 1 episode
2012	Stolberg	Marcel Kaminski	TV series, 1 episode
2012	The Tower	Ezzo Rohde	(TV movie)
2013	Beste Freundinnen	Bastian Ellermann	(TV movie)
2013	Letzte Spur Berlin	Tom Harthof	TV series, 1 episode
2014	München 7	Kuba	TV series, 1 episode
2014	Heiter bis tödlich - Hauptstadtrevier	Adam	TV series, 1 episode
2017	Die Chefin	Tobias Weidenbach	TV series, 1 episode
2018	Wolfsland	Clemens Olmützer	TV series, 1 episode

=== (as) Director ===
Year	Title	Notes
2010	Die blaue Periode ('The Blue Period')	(Short, written and directed by Moya), premiered at the Max Ophüls Film Festival
2010	Hollywood Drama	(Short, written and directed by Moya), was screened at the Berlinale
2011	Hotel Desire	(Short, written and directed by Moya),
2015	Stefanie Heinzmann's song In the End	(music Video short)
2016	The Huntingtans: Chewing Gum and Love Affairs	(Short, written and directed by Moya) won 'Best Casting' at Berlin Fashion Film Festival.
