= Clemens Schick =

German actor (born 1972)

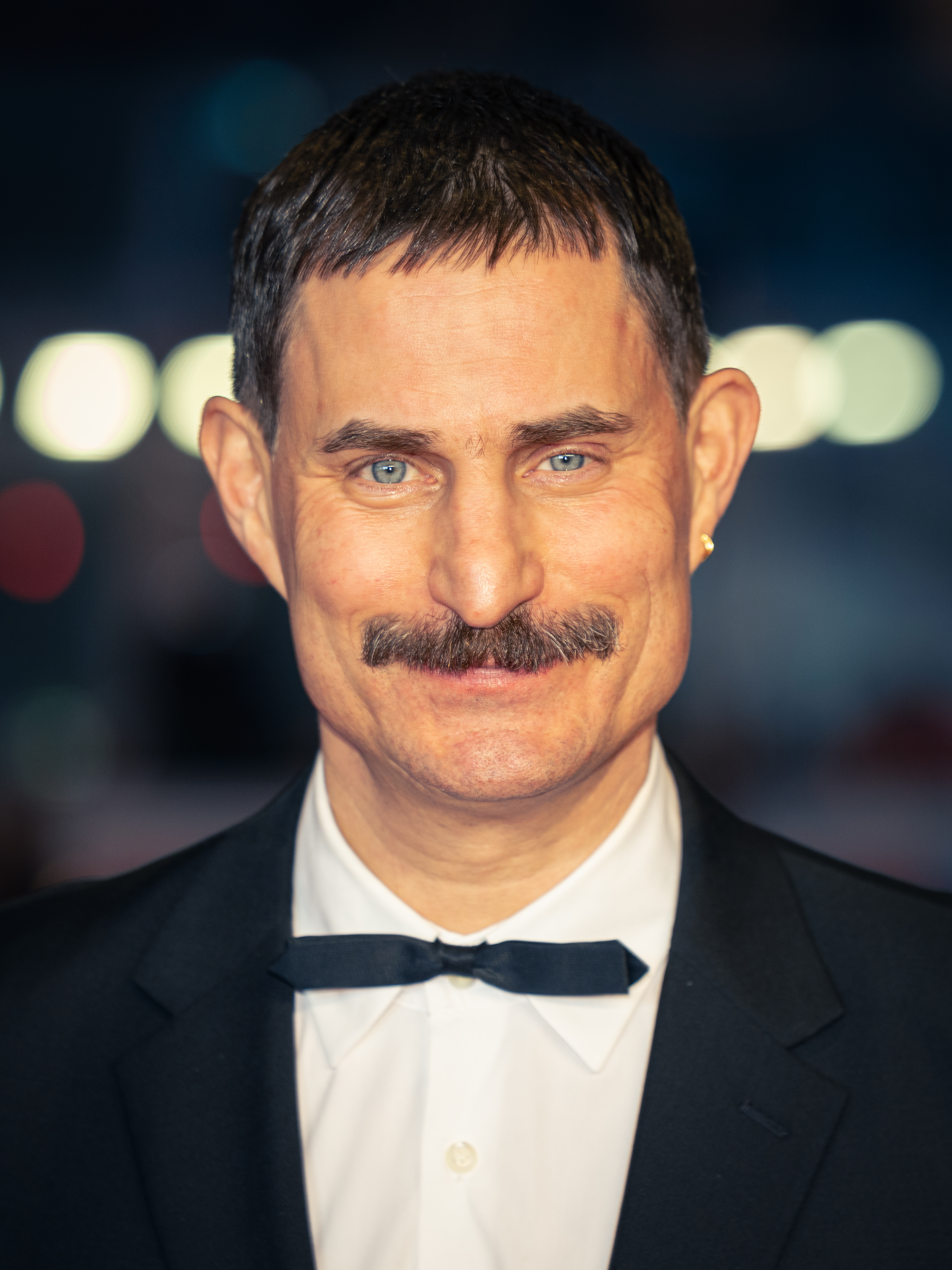
- Schick in 2025
- Born: 15 February 1972 (age 54); Tübingen, West Germany
- Occupation: Actor
- Years active: 1998–present

Clemens Schick (born 15 February 1972) is a German actor, model, political activist, and human rights advocate.

He has appeared in more than seventy films since 1998, including leading roles in both German and international productions. He has appeared in various major German and international TV productions and series.

He has also played several leading theatre roles in classical plays like William Shakespeare's Richard III, Friedrich Schiller's Don Carlos and Tennessee Williams' Cat on a Hot Tin Roof.

Schick is politically active and an active member of the German Social Democratic Party (SPD). He is an active champion of human rights issues and is a committee member of the German Human Rights Watch chapter.

== Life ==
Schick was born in Tübingen, West Germany. The son of a teacher and a prosecutor, he has four siblings, including a sister and an older brother. He studied at the Hölderlin High School in Stuttgart, from where he graduated in 1992. After his graduation, he enrolled at the Academy of Performing Arts (AdK) in Ulm.

Following one year of studies, the then 22-year-old Schick decided to leave Germany and headed for France, where he intended to join the monastery of the Taizé Community in Taizé, Saône-et-Loire. After an eight-month stay, however, he returned to Germany, where he enrolled at the Berlin School of Drama. He completed his studies in 1996, having financed his studies with part-time jobs as a landscape gardener, bouncer, and waiter in restaurants and pubs in Berlin-Mitte and Prenzlauer Berg.

In an interview with Gala magazine in September 2014, Schick came out as a homosexual. He stated that he is not interested in either "gay" or "heterosexual" labels and falls in love with both men and women, but only dates men. In the past he had a few girlfriends, including German actress Bibiana Beglau, who he briefly dated in 2010. Today, he lives in Kreuzberg in central Berlin.

== Theatre career ==
An actor with a confessed love for life on the classical stage, Schick has a long track record of engagements and leading roles in both modern and classic theatre plays, primarily with German theaters. His career include engagements at Staatsschauspiel Dresden, Schauspiel Frankfurt, Schauspielhaus Wien, Sophiensaelen, Kampnagel, Staatstheater Stuttgart, Schauspielhaus Zurich, Deutsches Schauspielhaus in Hamburg, Schauspielhaus Köln and Schaubühne Berlin,^{[4]} where he performed as 'Orestes' in Hugo von Hofmannsthal's play Elektra in 1999, and 'Major Vershinin' in Three Sisters by Chekhov in 2006.

From 2002 to 2006, Schick was a regular part of the ensemble at the Schauspielhaus Hannover, where he was seen in, among others, Johann Kresnik's directorial work of Peer Gynt, in a leading role in Cat on a Hot Tin Roof by Tennessee Williams under the direction of Christina Paulhofer, in leading roles in Shakespeare's Richard III and Twelfth Night under the direction of Sebastian Baumgarten, as well as the title role in Friedrich Schiller's Don Carlos, under the direction of Wilfred Minks.

In the summer of 2007 and again in 2008, Schick was also to be seen in the role as 'Death' at the Salzburg Festival in Hofmannsthal's Jedermann.

Schick's first solo show, Windows or: Let's imagine Bill Gates as a happy person, a monologue written by Mathias Greffrath, was staged by the Schauspielhaus Hannover in 2010. The play saw Schick in the role of Bill Gates musing with the audience about business, technology, narcissism and life's moral questions. He later performed in the solo show in the Sophiensäle theatre, and again for German soldiers stationed in Afghanistan.

== Cinema and television ==
In addition to his theatre work, Schick has acted extensively in both German and international film and TV productions with roles in more than 70 movies and TV series. His work spans from roles in Hollywood productions to independent cinema.

Arguably, his international breakthrough role came in the 21st James Bond movie, Casino Royale (2006), where Schick played alongside Daniel Craig and Eva Green in the role as the bodyguard 'Kratt' of the movie villain 'Le Chiffre' (Mads Mikkelsen).

The opening film of the "Perspective German Cinema" at the Berlinale 2007 was Upright Standing by Hannah Schweier, in which Schick plays the main role of 'Joe'. In 2008, Schick played alongside Alexandra Neldel and Erhan Emre the role of the detective 'Marco Lorenz' in the television series Innocent.

In 2008, he appeared in the French movie Largo Winch II, playing alongside Sharon Stone and Tomer Sisley, in the role as the villain Dragan Lazarevic.

In 2011, Schick and Saralisa Volm performed in the mainly crowdfunded financed erotic film Hotel Desire. The film features scenes of Volm and Schick engaging in unsimulated sex.

In 2013, Schick played in the French two-part TV mini-series Le vol des cigognes (or Flight of the Storks), an adaptation of the novel of the same name by Jean-Christophe Grangé. He took the role of the policeman 'Hervé Dumaz', who speaks French, English, and German. It was directed by Jan Kounen. Harry Treadaway, Perdita Weeks, and Rutger Hauer starred in other roles. It aired in January 2013 on Canal +.

In 2014, Schick joined the cast of Karim Aïnouz' Brazilian-German drama Praia do Futuro, playing among others alongside Wagner Moura and Jesuita Barbosa. Later that same year, he also appeared in Austrian-German mystery western The Dark Valley, directed by Andreas Prochaska, featuring Sam Riley and Paula Beer.

In 2015, Schick appeared in Theresa von Eltz' German drama 4 Könige, alongside Jella Haase, Jannis Niewöhner and Paula Beer. Also in 2015, he performed in Ericson Core's action thriller Point Break, with among others Edgar Ramirez, Luke Bracey and Teresa Palmer.

In 2018 he performed in the Finnish-German crime drama series Arctic Circle. Playing alongside Maximillian Brückner, Pihla Viitala and Iina Kuustonen among others, Schick is seen in the role of Marcus Eiben, a multimillionaire CEO of a pharmaceutical company. The series is directed by Hannu Salonen, a Finnish director based in Germany.

In 2019, Schick appeared in the Netflix-produced bio-pic Sergio, about the life of controversial diplomat Sergio Vieira de Mello, alongside Wagner Moura and Ana de Armas. That same year, he appeared in a leading role in the first German Netflix Original Kidnapping Stella (2019), directed and written by Thomas Sieben and featuring leading roles from Schick, Jella Haase and Max von der Groeben. In 2022 he appeared in the Dylan Moran BBC sit-com Stuck.

In 2026, he joined the series Babylon Berlin for its fifth and final season, playing Adolf Hitler.

== Volunteer work and political engagement ==
Schick is openly politically engaged and has been an active member of the Social Democratic Party of Germany (SPD), since 2016. He was actively supporting the SPD-initiated "My Voice for Reason" campaign in 2016.

In 2008, Schick visited the German ISAF contingent in Masar-e Sharif (Camp Marmal), Kunduz and Feyzabad in Afghanistan. Here he performed his solo show Windows for the troops, and was accompanied by a camera crew, for a documentary by Jobst Knigge which was titled "The Trooper: Clemens Schick plays theatre in Afghanistan". Schick visited the troops again in 2011 and 2012, supporting the German soldiers at Afghan military sites of the German ISAF troops through theatre performances in Masar-i-Sharif and Kabul.

Schick also participated in the Alliance Against Castor 2010 and signed a call for artists in numerous newspapers, calling on the population to take part in protests against the castor transport and the extension of the term of German nuclear power plants.

Schick is a member of Human Rights Watch, and sits on the charter's Berlin committee. He is a member of the Bundesverband Schauspiel (BFFS or Federal Association of Acting), and an ambassador for the Hugo Tempelmann Stiftung, a non-profit working to battle HIV in South Africa.

In 1996 and again in 2009, Schick modelled in Paris and Berlin for U.S. photographer Nan Goldin.

Since 13 August 2016, he is a member of the Social Democratic Party of Germany (SPD).

In 2018, Schick was named a brand ambassador for German luxury brand Montblanc.

== Filmography ==
=== Film ===
Year	Title	Role	Notes
2001	Enemy at the Gates	German NCO	
2006	Casino Royale	Kratt	
2009	Jedem das Seine	Georg	
2010	Cindy Does Not Love Me	Franz	
2010	Transit	Martin	
2010	Hollywood Drama	Franz Arnold	(Short, written and directed by Sergej Moya), was screened at the Berlinale
2011	Largo Winch II	Dragan Lazarevic	He learned how to skydive
2011	German for Kids		
2012	The Treasure Knights and the Secret of Melusina	Duc de Barry	
2012	Forgotten	Johannes	
2012	The Child	Thomas Brandmann	
2013	The Girl from Nagasaki	Prince Yamadori	
2014	A House in Berlin	Lukas	
2014	The Dark Valley	Luis Brenner	
2014	Futuro Beach	Konrad	German-Brazilian film
2014	Better Than Nothing	Hans 'The Elvis'	
2015	4 Kings	Dr. Wolff	
2015	Point Break	Roach	
2016	Mann im Spagat: Pace, Cowboy, Pace	Tschick Macqueen	
2016	Collide	Mirko	
2016	Hidden Reserves	Vincent Baumann	
2017	Overdrive	Max Klemp	
2017	Renegades	Major Petrovic	
2017	Es war einmal Indianerland	Zöllner	
2017	Alguma Coisa Assim	Sven	
2018	Verlorene	Johann	
2020	Sergio	Gaby	
2023	Dogman	Mike Munrow	
2023	The Hunger Games: The Ballad of Songbirds & Snakes	Respectable Man	In the book, this character is named Nero Price

=== Television ===
Year	Title	Role	Notes
1998	Balko	Rolf Buderus	TV series, 1 episode
2000	Im Namen des Gesetzes	Snuff	TV series, 1 episode
2000	Golden Boy	Bens Kumpel	(TV movie)
2001	Doppelter Einsatz	Hesser	TV series, 1 episode
2001	HeliCops – Einsatz über Berlin	Aaron Ludwig	(TV movie)
2001	Ein starkes Team	Jan Neutzner	TV series, 1 episode
2001–2007	A Case for Two	Holger Offermann (2007)/ Christian Weidenfeld (2005)/ Nicolas Duval (2002)/ Frank Betzner (2001)	TV series, 4 episodes
2000	Wolff's Turf	Fred Beinlich	TV series, 1 episode
2000	Die Cleveren	Gregor Terk	TV series, 1 episode
2006	Tatort	Matthias Hecht	TV series, 1 episode
2006	Das Duo	Karsten Selig	TV series, 1 episode
2006	Alarm für Cobra 11 - Die Autobahnpolizei	Klaus Paschmann	TV series, 1 episode
2007	Mitte 30	Produzent Michael	(TV movie)
2008	The Miracle of Berlin	Unteroffizier Schröder	(TV movie)
2008	Innocent	Marco Lorenz	TV series, all 12 episodes
2008	Ich liebe den Mann meiner besten Freundin	Mark Trenker	(TV movie)
2009	Killerjagd. Töte mich, wenn du kannst	Marco Lorenz	(TV movie)
2010	The Secret of the Whales	Dr. Eric Cluster	(TV movie)
2010	Killerjagd. Schrei, wenn du dich traust	Marco Lorenz	(TV movie)
2011, 2015	Nachtschicht	Ronny Vogel (2015)/ Franz Pirroni (2011)	TV series, 2 episodes
2012	Mord in Ludwigslust	Ben Martin	(TV movie)
2012	Wolff – Kampf im Revier	Romeo	(TV movie)
2012	The Hunt for the Amber Room	Jan van Hassel	(TV movie)
2013	The Old Fox	Hans Eigendorf	TV series, 1 episode
2013	Rosa Roth	Prosecutor Gander	TV series, 1 episode
2013	Letzte Spur Berlin	Mike Drobowsky	TV series, 1 episode
2013	Flight of the Storks	Hervé Dumaz	(2 episode TV Mini-series)
2013	Das Jerusalem-Syndrom	Peter	(TV movie)
2014	Matador (TV series)	Darko	TV series, 1 episode
2016	Treffen sich zwei	Thomas	(TV movie)
2016	Sommernachtsmord	Elmar Löffelhart	(TV movie)
2017–present	Der Barcelona Krimi	Xavi Bonet	TV series, 10+ episodes
2018	Tannbach	Wolfgang Herder	TV series, 3 episodes, known as English subtitled version as 'Line of Separation'.
2018	Dengler	Malakov	TV series, 1 episode
2018–2019	Arctic Circle	Marcus Eiben	TV series, 9 episodes
2019	Kidnapping Stella	V	TV movie, produced by Netflix
2020	Das Boot	(Corvette captain) Johannes von Reinhartz	TV series, 8 episodes
2022	Stuck	Kurt	BBC mini-series
2022	Andor	Ham	TV series, 3 episodes
2027	Babylon Berlin	Adolf Hitler	TV series, 8 episodes

== Other work ==
In 2016, he was the main actor in the music video for Fritz Kalkbrenner's track "In This Game".
