= Frederick Lau =

German actor (born 1989)

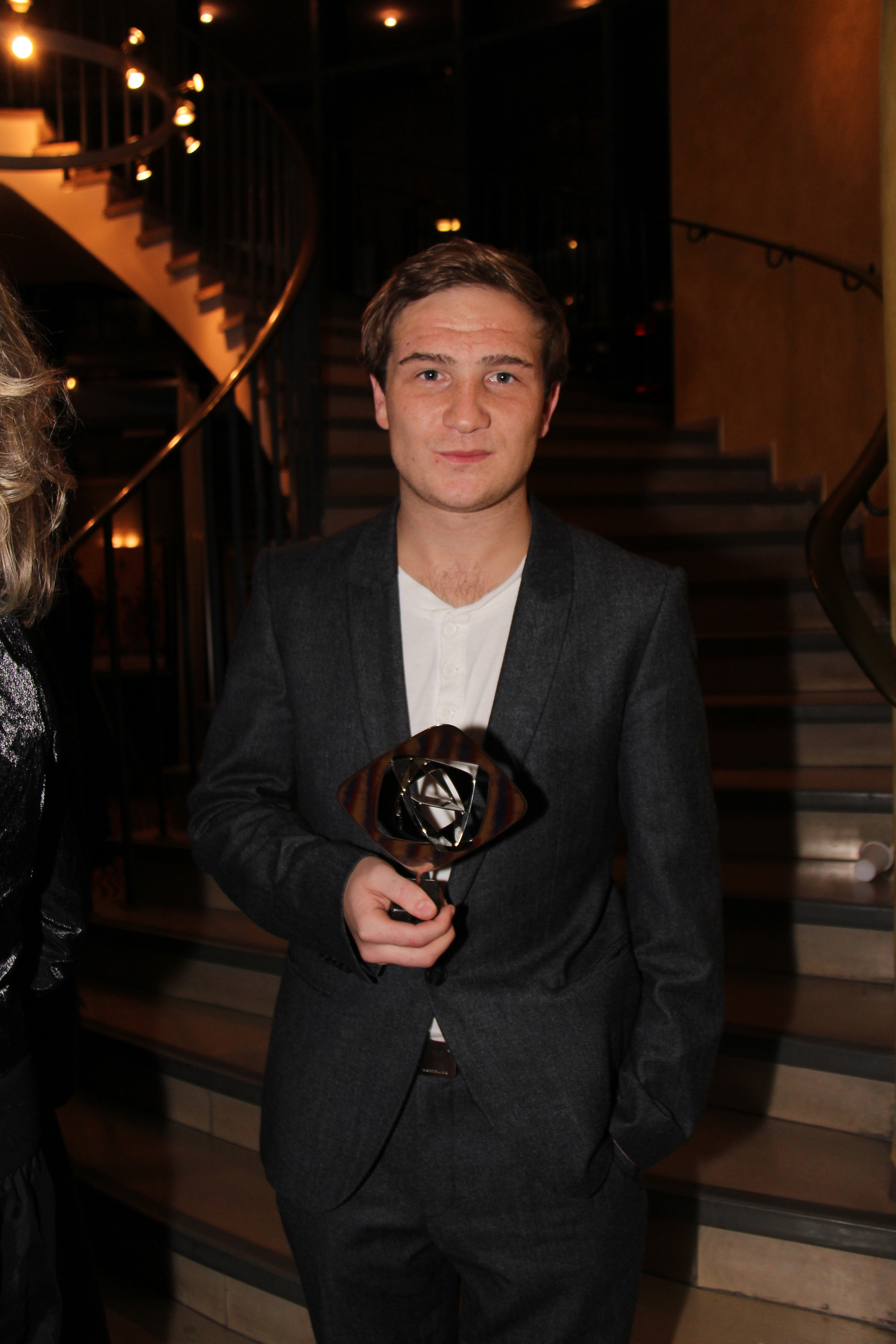
- Frederick Lau in 2011
- Born: 17 August 1989 (age 36); Steglitz, West Berlin, West Germany
- Occupation: Actor
- Years active: 2000–present
- Spouse: Annika Kipp (m. 2015)
- Children: 3

Frederick Lau (born 17 August 1989) is a German actor.

== Biography ==
He grew up in Berlin-Steglitz, and still lives there. He was awarded the Deutscher Filmpreis (German Film Awards, colloquially known as the Lolas) for portraying the student Tim in the film Die Welle based on the novel by Todd Strasser. Since 2000 he has played over 50 roles in film and television.

== Filmography ==
=== Film ===
Year	Film	Role	Notes
2000	Policewoman	Boy	
2002	Der Brief des Kosmonauten	Heinrich Wormsbecher	
2003	The Flying Classroom	Matz Selbmann	
2004	Bibi Blocksberg and the Secret of the Blue Owls	David	
2004	Rock Crystal	Marc	
2005	The Call of the Toad	standard bearer	
2007	Head Under Water	Rico Bartsch	
2008	The Wave	Tim Stoltefuss	German Film Award for Best Performance by an Actor in a Supporting Role
2008	The Invention of Curried Sausage	Jürgen Brücker	
2009	The Countess	Janos	
2010	Picco	Marc	
2012	A Coffee in Berlin	Ronny	
2013	Ummah – Among Friends	Daniel Klemm	
2014	Coming In	Didi	
2015	Victoria	Sonne	German Film Award for Best Performance by an Actor in a Leading Role
2015	Punk Berlin 1982	Gries	
2015	3 Türken und ein Baby	Matthias	
2016	Scrappin'	Letscho Talhammer	
2016	Heart of Stone	Peter Munk	
2017	The Captain	Kipinski	
2017	Gutland	Jens Fauser	
2017	Simpel	Ben	
2018	Playmaker	Ivo	director Timon Modersohn
2019	Sweethearts	Harry	
2020	Rising High	Gerry	
2020	Man from Beirut		
2021	Commitment Phobia	Tim	
2022	Wolke unterm Dach	Paul	
2023	One for the Road	Mark	

=== Television ===
Year	Programme or series	Role	Notes
2000	Achterbahn	Christian	
2001	Doppelter Einsatz Berlin – Wehe dem, der liebt	Daniel	
2001	Dr. Sommerfeld – Neues vom Bülowbogen	Sven Förster	
2001	Wie angelt man sich einen Müllmann?	Jojo	
2001	Jonathans Liebe	Frederick	
2002	Drei Stern Rot	janitor	
2002	Kleeblatt küsst Kaktus	Clemens Schreiber	
2002	Der Tod ist kein Beinbruch	Sven Senner	
2003	Rotlicht – Im Dickicht der Grossstadt	Marko	
2003	Wer küsst schon einen Leguan?	Tobias Baumann	
2004	Sterne leuchten auch am Tag	Max	
2004	Der verzauberte Otter	Malte	
2005	Leipzig Homicide	Dennis Forster	
2006	Cologne P.D.	Florian Völkel	
2006	Polizeiruf 110	young Keller	
2006	Unsere 10 Gebote	Hendrik	
2006	Cold Summer	Paul Kuhlke	
2006	Destined to Witness	Fiete Petersen - Age 14-18	
2007	Der Kriminalist	Dennis	
2007	Wie verführ ich meinen Ehemann	Jonas Henning	
2007	Liebling, wir haben geerbt!	Paul Held	
2007	An die Grenze	Knut	
2007–2008	Tatort	Dennis; Kevin Stemmler	two episodes
2008	Eugen's Welt	Eugen	
2009	Ein Dorf schweigt	Heinz Zedlitz	
2009	Der neue Tag	Sascha	
2009	Notruf Hafenkante	Mike	
2009	Doctor's Diary	Jonas	
2009	Der Lehrer	Picko	
2009	What You Don't See	David	
2009	Ihr Auftrag, Pater Castell	Justus von Rothenburg	
2010	Neue Vahr Süd	Frank Lehmann	
2011	Go West - Freiheit um jeden Preis	Alex Baumgarten	
2011	The Sinking of the Laconia	Fiedler	
2011	Open the Wall	Jens Rambold	(TV Movie)
2014	Not for Cowards	Philip Diercksen	
2015	Starfighter	Richie Weichert	
2015	Nachspielzeit	Roman	
2015	Berlin One	Conrad Ruppert	
2017	4 Blocks	Vince	
2024	Crooks	Charly	
2025	Brick	Marvin	(TV Movie)
