= Jürgen Goslar =

German actor and director (1927–2021)

- Born: 26 March 1927; Oldenburg, Germany
- Died: 5 October 2021 (aged 94); Ainring, Bavaria, Germany

Jürgen Goslar (26 March 1927 – 5 October 2021) was a German actor and director.

== Selected filmography ==
Actor

- Wo der Wildbach rauscht (1956), as Lorenz Gerold
- Wir Wunderkinder (1958), as Schally Meisegeier
- The Forests Sing Forever (1959), as Lt. Margas
- The Last Witness (1960), as Dr. Heinz Stephan
- The Time Has Come (1960, TV series) as Clive Freeman
- Das Kriminalmuseum: Die Fotokopie (1963, TV series episode), as Kriminalinspektor Breitenfeld
- Das Kriminalmuseum: Der Füllfederhalter (1964, TV series episode), as Kriminalinspektor Manfred Beyer
- Der Kommissar: Anonymer Anruf (1970, TV series episode), as Busse
- Der Kommissar: Die Nacht, in der Basseck starb (1973, TV series episode), as Mario Basseck
- Der Kommissar: Noch zehn Minuten zu leben (1975, TV series episode), as Bottner
- Derrick - Season 3, Episode 9: "Ein unbegreiflicher Typ" (1976, TV), as Herr Schündler
- Derrick - Season 05, Episode 01: "Der Fotograf" (1978, TV), as Blodin
- Derrick - Season 7, Episode 1: "Hanna, liebe Hanna" (1980, TV), as Ewald Balke
- Derrick - Season 10, Episode 3: "Geheimnisse einer Nacht" (1983, TV), as Dr. Albert Vrings
- Das Erbe der Guldenburgs (1987, TV series), as Max von Guldenburg
- The Old Fox: Die Nacht kommt schneller als du denkst (2008, TV series episode), as Adrian Derwand

Director

- Das Mädchen und der Staatsanwalt (1962)
- Liebling, ich muß dich erschießen (1962)
- Terror After Midnight (1962)
- Wo liegt Jena? (1967, TV film)
- Im Busch von Mexiko – Das Rätsel B. Traven (1967, TV series)
- Die Baumwollpflücker (1970, TV series)
- Diamantendetektiv Dick Donald (1971, TV series)
- Vreemde Wêreld (1974)
- Albino (1976)
- Slavers (1978)

Writer

- Love Nights in the Taiga (1967)
- No Gold for a Dead Diver (dir. Harald Reinl, 1974)
