= Commitment Phobia (film) =

German romantic comedy film

- Theatrical release poster
- Directed by: Helena Hufnagel
- Written by: Helena Hufnagel; Hilly Martinek
- Based on: Generation Beziehungsunfähig by Michael Nast
- Produced by: Kristina Löbbert; Patrick Zorer; Stephanie Schettler-Köhler; Dan Maag; Willi Geike; Marco Beckmann
- Starring: Luise Heyer; Frederick Lau
- Cinematography: Andreas Berger
- Edited by: Frank Müller
- Music by: Matthias Hauck; Nepomuk Heller
- Production companies: Pantaleon Films; Warner Bros. Film Productions Germany; Brainpool; WS Filmproduktion
- Distributed by: Warner Bros. Pictures
- Release date: 29 July 2021
- Running time: 84 minutes
- Countries: Germany; Switzerland
- Language: German

Commitment Phobia (German: Generation Beziehungsunfähig) is a 2021 German romantic comedy film directed by Helena Hufnagel.

== Cast ==
- Frederick Lau as Tim
- Luise Heyer as Ghost
- Henriette Confurius as Charlie
- Tedros Teclebrhan as Luis
- Maximilian Brückner as Andreas
- Verena Altenberger as Martha
- Susanne Wuest as Polizistin
- Victoria Trauttmansdorff as Elisabeth
- Artjom Gilz as Udi
- Odine Johne as Claire
- Tom Keune as Herr Zimmermann
