= Volm =

Volm may refer to:

- Saralisa Volm (born 1985), German actress
- Volm, a fictional race in the Falling Skies television series
