= Kanzleramt (disambiguation) =

Kanzleramt may refer to:

- German Chancellery, the German federal agency serving the Bundeskanzler
- Federal Chancellery, the building where the aforementioned agency is based
- Kanzleramt (TV series), a 2005 German TV program
