= All of a Sudden (2016 film) =

2016 film

- Directed by: Aslı Özge
- Written by: Aslı Özge
- Starring: Sebastian Hülk
- Cinematography: Emre Erkmen
- Release date: 12 February 2016 (Berlin)
- Running time: 112 minutes
- Country: Germany
- Language: German

All of a Sudden (German: Auf Einmal) is a 2016 German drama film directed by Aslı Özge. It was shown in the Panorama section at the 66th Berlin International Film Festival.

== Cast ==
- Sebastian Hülk as Karsten
- Julia Jentsch as Laura
- Hanns Zischler as Klaus
- Sascha Alexander Geršak as Andrej
- Luise Heyer as Judith
- Lea Draeger as Caro
- Natalia Belitski as Anna
