= Annika Kipp =

German TV presenter

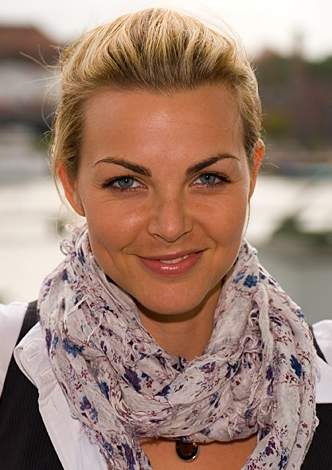
Annika Kipp.

Annika Lau (née Kipp, born 12 March 1979 in Munich) is a German News presenter on radio and television. She used to work for Antenne Bayern (a German radio station), but since 2006 has worked for Sat.1. From June 2021 to April 2022, Lau again hosted Sat.1 breakfast television, filling in for Alina Merkau, who went on maternity leave.

Her husband is the actor Frederick Lau.
