= Das Mädchen und der Staatsanwalt =

1962 film

- Directed by: Jürgen Goslar
- Written by: Jürgen Goslar; Fred Ignor
- Starring: Wolfgang Preiss; Götz George; Elke Sommer
- Distributed by: Nora
- Release date: 8 March 1962
- Running time: 88 minutes
- Country: West Germany
- Language: German

Das Mädchen und der Staatsanwalt ("The Girl and the Prosecutor") is a 1962 West German drama film directed by Jürgen Goslar and starring Wolfgang Preiss, Götz George, and Elke Sommer.

== Cast ==
- Wolfgang Preiss as Staatsanwalt Soldan
- Elke Sommer as Renate Hecker
- Götz George as Jochen Rehbert
- Berta Drews as Frau Hecker
- Agnes Fink as Frau Soldan
- Fritz Tillmann as Doctor Stoll
- Paul Dahlke as Vorsitzender
- Ann Smyrner as Monika Pinkus
- Horst Janson as Thomas Ungermann
