= Sönke Möhring =

German actor

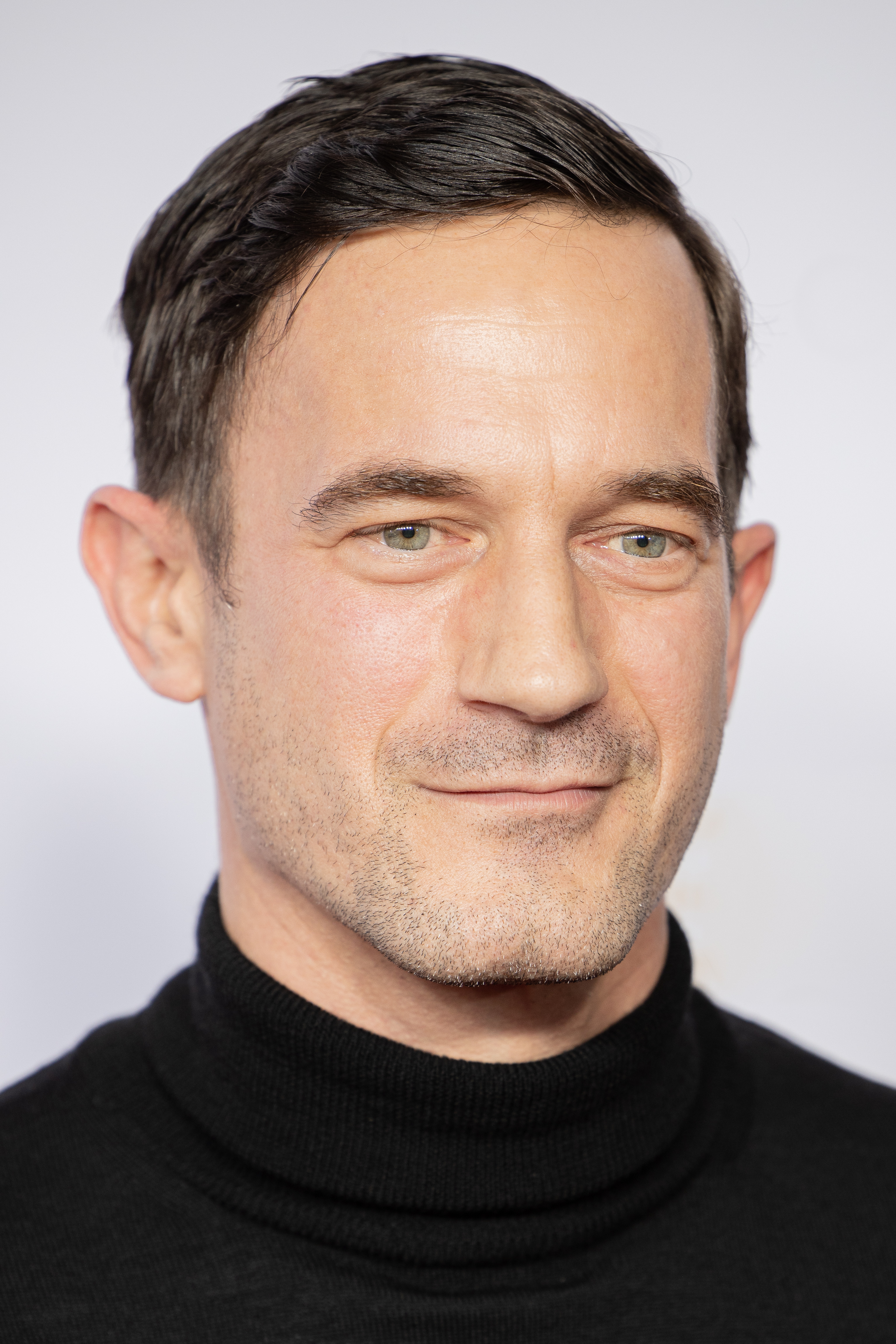
- Möhring in 2020
- Born: 12 October 1972 (age 53); Unna, West Germany
- Occupation: Actor
- Years active: 2003–present
- Relatives: Wotan Wilke Möhring (brother)

Sönke Möhring (born 12 October 1972) is a German actor.

== Life and work ==
Möhring grew up in Herne. His father was an army officer and his mother worked as a teacher. He has a sister and two brothers. After his brother Wotan Wilke Möhring became an actor in the early 2000s, Sönke followed him to also become an actor. With his brother, he participated in a few movies such as Video Kings, Cowgirl and Goldene Zeiten.

Möhring made his national debut in Stefan Ruzowitzky's Anatomy 2 and his international film debut in Quentin Tarantino's Inglourious Basterds.

== Filmography ==
Year	Title	Role	Notes
2003	Anatomy 1, 2, 3 & 4	Mannschaftskapitän	
2003	Hanni und Nanni?	Hip Hopper	TV movie
2004	Cowgirl	Kläuschen Blessing	
2005	Blindes Vertrauen	Jan	TV movie
2006	Goldene Zeiten	Holgi	
2006	Kidnapping McKinsey		TV movie
2007	Video Kings	Matze	
2007	Allein unter Bauern	Polizeimeister Bernd Innkamm	Episode: "Der alte Mann und das Gewehr"
2007	Wortbrot	Robert	
2008	Maddin in Love	Sascha	8 episodes
2008	Pretty Mama	Postbote	TV movie
2008–2019	SOKO Wismar	Markus Böttwig / Karl Wagner / Tilo Mühlmann	3 episodes
2008–2012	Leipzig Homicide	Joe Windisch	2 episodes
2009	Schillerstraße	Sönke	2 episodes
2009	Phantomschmerz	Freunde beim Abendessen	
2009	Inglourious Basterds	Pvt. Butz / Walter Frazer	
2009	Bella Block	Versicherungsberater	Episode: "Vorsehung"
2009	Zweiohrküken	Assi 1	
2011	Kokowääh	Polizist	
2012	The Impossible	Karl Schweber	
2017	Montrak	Graf Montrak	
2018	All About Me	Heinz Kerkeling	
