= The Most Beautiful Couple =

2018 film

- Directed by: Sven Taddicken
- Written by: Sven Taddicken
- Starring: Maximilian Brückner
- Music by: Éric Neveux
- Release date: 9 September 2018 (TIFF)
- Running time: 97 minutes
- Country: Germany
- Language: German

The Most Beautiful Couple (German: Das schönste Paar) is a 2018 German drama film directed by Sven Taddicken. It was screened in the Contemporary World Cinema section at the 2018 Toronto International Film Festival.

== Cast ==
- Maximilian Brückner as Malte
- Luise Heyer as Liv
- Florian Bartholomäi as Henning
- Jasna Fritzi Bauer as Jenny
- Inga Birkenfeld as Maren
