= Go West – Freiheit um jeden Preis =

- Genre: Drama
- Screenplay by: Matthias Pacht
- Story by: Daniel Mann; Marco Gilles; Alexander Hofmann
- Directed by: Andreas Linke
- Starring: Sergej Moya; Franz Dinda; Frederick Lau; Inez Bjørg David
- Theme music composer: Christopher Bremus
- Country of origin: Germany
- Original language: German
- No. of episodes: 2

Production
- Cinematography: Stefan Unterberger
- Editor: Jens Klüber
- Running time: 179 minutes
- Production companies: Gilles Mann Filmproduktion teamWorx Produktion für Kino und Fernsehen GmbH; ProSieben

Original release
- Network: ProSieben
- Release: January 6 – January 7, 2011

Go West – Freiheit um jeden Preis (Go West – Freedom at Any Price, English title: Fugitives) is a 2011 German television miniseries directed by Andreas Linke. Set in the summer of 1984, the story concentrates on three friends trying to escape East Germany.

The series originally was broadcast in Germany in two two-hour segments on January 6 and January 7, 2011, on ProSieben.

== Story ==
Summer 1984, East Germany: Three friends, who couldn't be more different from each other. The 18-year-old Frank Korbach is hopeful about a future as an actor. His best friend Thomas Peitz once again hasn't shown up to start his military service and is about to desert the colors. Together with the adventurous but yet naive Alex Baumgarten, Thomas wants to make a dream come true the three of them have since they were little kids: The escape into the west.

Frank, who wants to follow his acting career in East Germany, brings his friends to border, when a special force of the Stasi shows up. Alex, Thomas and Frank can come through for now. Of all people, Franks father, Major Kurt Korbach, has to go after his own son together with Stasi hardliner Leutnant Heinrich Frey. The merciless chase becomes a real test for Thomas, Alex and Frank's friendship.

== Production ==
After production started, all three main actors hiked from Berlin to Erfurt, the site of the film. On December 20, 2010, the German channel ProSieben released a video from the trip that Moya, Dinda and Lau took. The very same day, a two-minutes trailer was released; followed by a short thirty seconds trailer, assisted by music from Udo Lindenberg.

== Cast ==
- Sergej Moya as Frank Korbach
- Franz Dinda as Thomas Peitz
- Frederick Lau as Alex Baumgarten
- Inez Bjørg David as Maria Steiner
- Herbert Knaup as Major Kurt Korbach
- Matthias Koeberlin as Leutnant Heinrich Frey
- Jan-Gregor Kremp as Max Steiner
- David C. Bunners as Oswald Peitz
- Inka Friedrich as Beate Korbach

== Reception ==
The miniseries was well received and praised by critics. Rainer Tittelbach said, "This movie is really big television ... It's accurate, physical and absorbing ... Go West is an obligation for everyone who loves intelligent, young and emotional television." Meanwhile, Kino.de writes: "There were many escape dramas, but not one that was written for the young target group ... and has found with Sergej Moya, Franz Dinda and Frederick Lau, three of Germans young talents, who also show much of body assignment." "Moving TV event about freedom and friendship", says the TV Movie. And TV Direkt writes: "Brilliant actors in a fascinating story."

== DVD releases ==
Go West - Freiheit um jeden Preis is going to be released on DVD on January 10, 2011.
