= Man Called Gringo =

1965 film

- Film poster
- German: Sie nannten ihn Gringo
- Directed by: Roy Rowland
- Screenplay by: Alex Berg; Clarke Reynolds; Francisco Gozálvez
- Based on: G. Smith
- Produced by: Alfons Carcasona; Eduardo de la Fuente
- Starring: Götz George; Dan Martin; Alexandra Stewart
- Cinematography: Mel Merino
- Edited by: Fred Srp
- Music by: Heinz Gietz
- Production companies: International Germania Film; Procusa-Films; Hesperia Films S.A.
- Distributed by: Exportfilm Bischoff & Co.; Gala Film Distributors; Dipenfa Filmayer Video S.A.; Filmjuwelen; Green Wood Film
- Release date: 19 May 1965 (West Germany)
- Running time: 82 min
- Country: West Germany
- Language: English

Man Called Gringo (German: Sie nannten ihn Gringo) is a 1965 West German western film directed by Roy Rowland, written by Clarke Reynolds and Herbert Reinecker and starred by Götz George, Daniel Martín and Alexandra Stewart.

== Cast ==
- Götz George as Mace Carson
- Alexandra Stewart as Lucy Walton
- Helmut Schmid as Ken Denton
- Sieghardt Rupp as Reno
- Dan Martin as Gringo
- Silvia Solar as Kate Rowland
- Peter Tordy as Sam Martin
- Hugo Pimentez as Mac
- Franco Lantieri as Tinnie
- Valentino Macchi as Tim Walton
- Hilario Fuertes as Dave Walton
- Julio César Semper as Pecos
