= German for Kids =

German for Kids – Sprich mit!
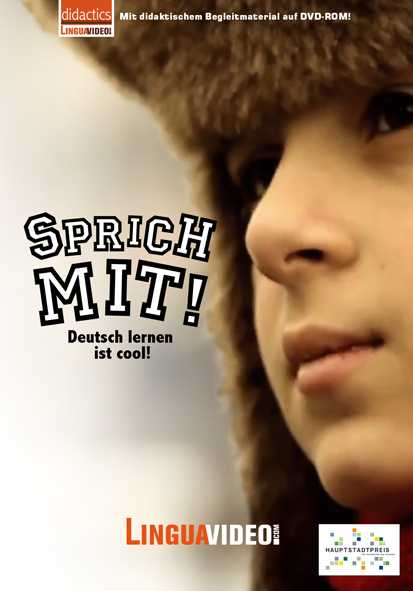
- Directed by: Sergej Moya
- Written by: Sergej Moya
- Produced by: Julia Moya; Christopher Zwickler
- Starring: Kaan Aydogdu; Hannah Herzsprung; Clemens Schick; Elyas M’Barek; Trystan Pütter; Leonardo Nigro; Stefan Konarske
- Cinematography: Armin Franzen
- Edited by: Rob Myers
- Music by: Stefan Henning; Sergej Lubic
- Distributed by: Lingua-Video.com
- Release date: 2011
- Running time: 23 minutes
- Country: Germany
- Language: German

German for Kids - Sprich mit! (German for Kids) is an educational film for children and an award-winning introduction to the German language.

== Plot ==
9-year-old Elias and his father are going for a walk in Berlin. Suddenly, Elias loses sight of his father. This is the start of an adventurous journey through the capital. But Elias has a problem: He doesn't speak German! Fortunately, many people help him with his search and teach him basic lessons of the German language. Elias learns how to introduce himself, how to express feelings, names of food, the alphabet, the numbers from 1 to 10, and many other things...

== Release ==
German for Kids premiered in Berlin on November 28, 2011.

The publishing house Lingua-Video.com released the film on DVD-ROM – licensed for educational purposes – in addition with 9 educational short films and a comprehensive study guide in November, 2011.

== DVD ==
The DVD-ROM – licensed for educational purposes – is in three parts:

1. Main feature (23 min.)
2. 9 educational short films (14 min.)
3. A comprehensive study guide
  - 6 units with detailed teacher guidelines
  - 49 work sheets for different levels (self-explanatory)
  - Wide variety of possible applications
  - Interactive picture gallery
  - Script
  - Links for further activities

== Reception ==
German for Kids – in Germany released as Sprich mit! – has been widely acclaimed and recommended by German politics and media.

== Awards ==
German for Kids has been awarded the Berlin prize for Integration and Tolerance 2011.
