= Playmaker (2018 film) =

- Theatrica release poster
- Directed by: Timon Modersohn
- Written by: Christian Brecht
- Produced by: Alexander Bickenbach; Manuel Bickenbach
- Starring: Frederick Lau; Antje Traue; Oliver Masucci
- Cinematography: Christian Rein
- Edited by: Jan Hille
- Music by: Riad Abdel-Nabi; Wouter Verhulst
- Production companies: Frisbeefilms; Warner Bros. Film Productions Germany; CINE PLUS
- Distributed by: Warner Bros. Pictures
- Release date: 12 April 2018
- Running time: 99 minutes
- Country: Germany
- Language: German

Playmaker (German: Spielmacher) is a 2018 German action drama film directed by Timon Modersohn.

It was released in Germany on 12 April 2018 by Warner Bros. Pictures.

== Cast ==
- Frederick Lau as Ivo
- Antje Traue as Vera Jakowski
- Oliver Masucci as Dejan
- Anton Weil as Marko
- Mateo Wansing Lorrio as Lukas Jakowski
- Natalia Avelon as Helena Srna
- Goran Navojec as Dario
- Blerim Destani as Vlado
- Ludwig Trepte as Tarik
- Jakup Muja as Semir
- Kida Khodr Ramadan: Juri
- Paul Faßnacht as Hermann Brunner
- Karl Markovics as Wirt
