= Das Kriminalmuseum =

Television series

- Genre: crime
- Country of origin: West Germany

Production
- Running time: 60–75 minutes

Original release
- Network: ZDF
- Release: April 1, 1963 – August 7, 1970

Das Kriminalmuseum is a German television series. It ran from 1963 to 1970 on ZDF and was one of its first programs. Each episode began with a tracking shot through an unspecified crime museum, stopping at one of the displays, whose story was then told. Each episode was between 60 and 75 minutes long and featured different actors as the criminal commissioner. The best known was Erik Ode, who in 1969 moved to Der Kommissar, appearing in 97 episodes. The theme music of the series was written by German composer Martin Böttcher, who also composed the complete scores for five episodes.

== Episodes ==
1. Fünf Fotos - Director: Helmut Ashley (4 April 1963)
2. Die Frau im Nerz - Director: Wolfgang Becker (25 April 1963)
3. Nur ein Schuh - Director: Helmut Ashley (20. June 1963)
4. Die Fotokopie - Director: Wolfgang Becker (4 July 1963)
5. Die Nadel - Director: Helmut Ashley (1 August 1963)
6. Zahlen-Code N - Director: Jürgen Goslar (10 October 1963)
7. Der stumme Kronzeuge - Director: Wolfgang Becker (2 January 1964)
8. Der Füllfederhalter - Director: Wolfgang Becker (2 April 1964)
9. Gesucht: Reisebegleiter - Director: Helmut Ashley (4 June 1964)
10. Akte Dr. W. - Director: Helmut Ashley (2 July 1964)
11. Der Fahrplan - Director: Theodor Grädler (10 September 1964)
12. Der Schlüssel - Director: Helmut Ashley (5 November 1964)
13. Tödliches Schach - Director: Helmut Ashley (3 December 1964)
14. Der Brief - Director: Jürgen Goslar (23 February 1965)
15. Die Mütze - Director: Wolfgang Becker (8 June 1965)
16. Der Ring - Director: Theodor Grädler (27 July 1965?)
17. Das Feuerzeug - Director: Joachim Hess (15 October 1965?)
18. Die Ansichtskarte - Director: Gedeon Kovács (23 November 1965)
19. Die Brille - Director: Dieter Lemmel (14 December 1965?)
20. Das Nummernschild - Director: Helmut Ashley (21 December 1965?)
21. Der Koffer - Director: Theodor Grädler (28 January 1966?)
22. Das Etikett - Director: Theodor Grädler (18 March 1966?)
23. Der Barockengel - Director: Dieter Lemmel (24 June 1966)
24. Das Amulett - Director: Dieter Lemmel (3 February 1967?)
25. Die Telefonnummer - Director: Otto Meyer (17 February 1967)
26. Die Kiste - Director: Wolfgang Becker (3 March 1967?)
27. Die rote Maske - Director: Helmut Ashley (12 March 1967)
28. Die Reisetasche - Director: Erich Neureuther (7 April 1967?)
29. Teerosen - Director: Georg Tressler (12 May 1967)
30. Die Briefmarke - Director: Georg Tressler (26 May 1967)
31. Die Kamera - Director: Helmut Ashley (7 July 1967)
32. Die Zündschnur - Director: Erich Neureuther (4 August 1967)
33. Kaliber 9 - Director: Jürgen Goslar (1 September 1967)
34. Das Kabel - Director: Helmut Ashley (8 September 1967)
35. Die Spur führt nach Amsterdam (or: Komplizen) - Director: Wolfgang Becker (scheduled for 1 December 1967 but failed and aired later)
36. Das Goldstück - Director: Dietrich Haugk (12 January 1968)
37. Die Reifenspur - Director: Rudolf Jugert (2 February 1968)
38. Die Postanweisung - Director: Helmut Ashley (5 April 1968)
39. Der Bohrer - Director: Erich Neureuther (12 July 1968)
40. Der Scheck - Director: Helmut Ashley (30 August 1968)
41. Wer klingelt schon zur Fernsehzeit - Director: Georg Tressler (7 August 1970) (The film was produced under the working title "Die Wäscheleine" and was provided as a result of Das Kriminalmuseum. The first broadcast successes but then without a reference to the series.)
