= Westwind (film) =

- Film poster
- Directed by: Robert Thalheim
- Starring: Friederike Becht; Luise Heyer
- Release date: 25 August 2011
- Running time: 89 minutes
- Country: Germany
- Language: German

Westwind is a 2011 German romantic drama film directed by Robert Thalheim. It is based on a true story.

== Plot ==
In 1988, two inseparable teenage twin sisters from East Germany, Doreen and Isabel travel outside the country for their first time. They visit a summer sports camp on the bank of lake Balaton in Hungary training for a sculling championship. They also travel to a part of the Soviet bloc. After missing their bus, the sisters accept a lift from five young men including Arne and Nico from Hamburg in West Germany who were holidaying. The girls get scolded by their supervisor for communicating with West Germans who are considered as enemy. Doreen gets romantically involved with Arne; and in the meeting of east and west, the love as well as the bond between the sisters are tested.

== Cast ==
- Friederike Becht as Doreen
- Luise Heyer as Isabel
- Franz Dinda as Arne
- Volker Bruch as Nico
- Hans-Uwe Bauer as Balisch
- Hannes Wegener as Klaus
- Albrecht Schuch as Ronny
- Golo Euler
- Ole Fischer
