= The Sparrow in the Chimney =

2024 Swiss drama film by Ramon Zürcher

- Promotional poster
- German: Der Spatz im Kamin
- Directed by: Ramon Zürcher
- Written by: Ramon Zürcher
- Produced by: Silvan Zürcher
- Starring: Maren Eggert; Andreas Döhler; Britta Hammelstein; Luise Heyer
- Cinematography: Alex Hasskerl
- Edited by: Ramon Zürcher
- Music by: Balz Bachmann
- Production companies: Zürcher Film; SRG SSR
- Distributed by: Filmcoopi
- Release date: August 10, 2024 (Locarno)
- Running time: 117 minutes
- Country: Switzerland
- Language: German

The Sparrow in the Chimney (German: Der Spatz im Kamin) is a Swiss drama film, directed by Ramon Zürcher. The film, starring Maren Eggert, Britta Hammelstein, Andreas Döhler, Luise Heyer and Milian Zerzawy, is the third part of a trilogy about family life, after The Strange Kitten and The Girl and the Spider, which the director created together with his twin brother Silvan Zürcher. The film follows two adult siblings who come together with their respective families in their parents' house in Switzerland to celebrate a birthday.

The film premiered at the 77th Locarno Film Festival on 10 August 2024 in Main Competition section. The theatrical release in Germany is scheduled for 10 October 2024.

== Synopsis ==
Karen and Markus reside with their children in the picturesque home in Rapperswil, Bern, where Karen grew up. Jule, Karen's sister, and her family come to celebrate Markus's birthday. Memories of their late mother stir Jule's desire to resist Karen's control. As the house becomes livelier, Karen grows increasingly tense, leading to a climactic moment where parts of the past are shattered to make way for something new.

== Cast ==
- Maren Eggert as Karen
- Andreas Döhler as Markus
- Britta Hammelstein as Julie
- Luise Heyer as Liv
- Milian Zerzawy as Jurek
- Paula Schindler as Christina
- Lea Zoë Voss as Johanna
- Ilya Bultmann as Leon
- Stephanie Greco as Edda

== Production ==
The film written and directed by Ramon is the third and final part of Ramon Zürcher and Silvan Zürcher's trilogy about family life, following The Strange Kitten 2013 and The Girl and the Spider 2021. The music was composed by Balz Bachmann.

Maren Eggert and Andreas Döhler play the parents Karen and Markus in the main roles, and Britta Hammelstein plays Karen's sister Jule. Other roles are played by Milian Zerzawy as Karen's brother-in-law Jurek and Luise Heyer as the arsonist Liv, who lives nearby and spent a long time in a psychiatric hospital. Lea Zoë Voss plays Johanna, Karen's eldest daughter, and Ilja Bultmann plays her youngest son Leon.

The film was supported by the Swiss Federal Office of Culture and received production funding of 695,000 Swiss franc from the Bern Film Fund.

Filming began on 11 July 2022 and took place over 35 shooting days until the end of August 2022, mostly in a large house in Rapperswil, Bern, where the film is set.

== Release ==
The Sparrow in the Chimney had its world premiere on 10 August 2024, as part of the 77th Locarno Film Festival, in Main Competition. It competed at the Pingyao International Film Festival in the Crouching Tigers competition held from 21 to 30 September 2024, where it won Roberto Rossellini Award for Best Film. It was also showcased at the Vancouver International Film Festival in Panorama on 27 September 2024.

It was theatrically released in Switzerland on 19 September 2024 and in Germany it is scheduled for release on 10 October 2024.

The film was screened at the Filmfest Hamburg in Kaleidoscope section on 3 October 2024, at the MAMI Mumbai Film Festival 2024 in the World Cinema section, and on 23 October at the 60th Chicago International Film Festival, where it competed in International Competition. On 28 October 2024, the film was showcased at the 37th Tokyo International Film Festival in 'Youth' section.

The film will be screened in Global Vision at the 49th Hong Kong International Film Festival on 11 April 2025.

== Reception ==
On the review aggregator Rotten Tomatoes website, the film has an approval rating of 90% based on 12 reviews, with an average rating of 7.5/10.

Reviewing for Cineuropa, Giorgia Del Don wrote, "A kind of dystopic fairy tale with horror film overtones, the movie transports the audience to a cruel but sincere world where people have freed themselves from the dictates of a society intent on assigning roles to each of us at birth, and are finally discovering their true, wild, defiant, animal nature."

Guy Lodge reviewing in Variety said, "The Sparrow in the Chimney may be a crowded work, sparking and seizing with nervous energy, but there’s a mutually enhancing tension between the rough-and-tumble of the drama and the refinement of the filmmaking."

PopMatters put it in their annual listicle, comparing it to The Lion In Winter and The Royal Tenenbaums:"What makes Ramon Zürcher’s film stand out from the realm of indie family drama is the way it is shot and edited. The director uses long takes, kaleidoscopic colour palettes, and Balz Bachmann‘s pensive score to flesh out this abstract world."

== Accolades ==
In August 2024, it was selected for nomination to 37th European Film Awards to be held at Kultur- und Kongresszentrum Luzern in Lucerne on 7 December 2024.

The film was ranked 13th among the top 25 European works of 2024 by the journalists at Cineuropa.

Award	Ceremony date	Category	Recipient(s)	Result	Ref.
Locarno Film Festival	17 August 2024	Golden Leopard	Ramon Zürcher	Nominated	
Pingyao International Film Festival	30 September 2024	Roberto Rossellini Award for Best Film	The Sparrow in the Chimney	Won	
Chicago International Film Festival	27 October 2024	Gold Hugo	The Sparrow in the Chimney	Nominated	
