= Mein Vater =

2003 film

- Written by: Karl-Heinz Käfer
- Directed by: Andreas Kleinert
- Starring: Götz George; Klaus J. Behrendt; Ulrike Krumbiegel; Sergej Moya; Christine Schorn
- Theme music composer: Andreas Hoge
- Country of origin: Germany
- Original language: German

Production
- Producer: Sonja Goslicki
- Cinematography: Johann Feindt
- Editor: Gisela Zick
- Running time: 90 minutes

Original release
- Network: Das Erste (WDR)
- Release: 8 January 2003

Mein Vater (English: Coming Home) is a 2003 German television film directed by Andreas Kleinert.

Klaus J. Behrendt was awarded in 2003, the 'Audience Award of the Marl Group' at the Adolf Grimme Prize and the Bavarian Television Award. In addition, the film was awarded the International Emmy Award for best TV movie.

== Cast ==
- Götz George ... Richard Esser
- Klaus J. Behrendt ... Jochen Esser
- Ulrike Krumbiegel ... Anja Esser
- Sergej Moya ... Oliver Esser
- Christine Schorn ... Karin
- Nicholas Bodeux ... Jochen's friend

== Awards ==
Year	Award	Category	Nominated	Result
2003	31st International Emmy Awards	Best TV Movies/Miniseries	Mein Vater	Won
