= Schulz & Schulz =

- Created by: Krystian Martinek; Neithardt Riedel
- Starring: Götz George
- Composers: Andreas Köbner; Stefan Traub; Mario Lauer
- Country of origin: Germany
- Original language: German
- No. of episodes: 5

Production
- Camera setup: Frank Brühne; Ulrich Krafzik; David Slama; Lutz Konermann; Martin Peglau
- Running time: 90

Schulz & Schulz is a TV series consisting of five feature-length films starring Götz George in a dual role as twin brothers Wolfgang and Walter Schulz who were separated during World War II and then raised in different parts of Germany. The first film was broadcast while the German Democratic Republic still existed. In the aftermath following the fall of the Berlin Wall many new topics arose. The instalments showed how difficult it was for a great many citizens of the German Democratic Republic to get accustomed to the new way of life and how German people tried to overcome all of that together.

== Cast ==
Character	Actor	Episode
Walter Schulz Wolfgang Schulz	Götz George	All
Erika	Marlen Diekhoff	All
Britta	Martina Gedeck	All
Seibt	Klaus J. Behrendt	All
Erwin	Gerhard Garbers	All
Guenther	Werner Schwuchow	All
Alexander	Bodo Frank	All
Dorothee	Sybille Waury	1–4
Jochen	Krystian Martinek	All
Ma Schulz	Carmen Molinar	All
Wally	Irmgard Riessen	2–5
hooligan	Moritz Bleibtreu	5
waiter	Eberhard Feik	1 (cameo)

=== Overview of all episodes ===
№	Title	Air date
1	"Schulz & Schulz"	December 10, 1989
Walter Schulz, who lives in the German Democratic Republic, discovers by accident that his brother Wolfgang is alive in the other German state. He manages to meet him and they decide to take advantage of the obvious fact that they still resemble each other. They switch identities, only successively realising how much life in northern Germany differs.
2	"Aller Anfang ist schwer"	March 31, 1991
Walter Schulz comes with his wife and his two children to Hamburg and his brother supports him while he is starting his own business. Yet Walter's former superior Guenther sabotages him by accusing him falsely of having been a Stasi informer
3	"Wechselspiele"	April 13, 1992
Both brothers are still struggling with their different past. Wolfgang is about to marry Britta and Walter is still struggling with Guenther's schemes
4	"Neue Welten, alte Lasten"	December 27, 1992
Wolfgang tries to convince Walter to become a politician in Stralsund but Walter resists because he is appalled that former Stasi employee Guenther is very successful in reunited Germany.
5	"Fünf vor zwölf "	December 22, 1993
While Walter becomes a pub owner his son happens to get under the influence of hooligans
