= All About Me (film) =

2018 German biopic

- Theatrical release poster
- Directed by: Caroline Link
- Written by: Ruth Toma
- Produced by: Hermann Florin; Nico Hofmann; Sebastian Werninger
- Starring: Julius Weckauf; Luise Heyer; Sönke Möhring
- Cinematography: Judith Kaufmann
- Music by: Niki Reiser
- Production companies: UFA Fiction; Warner Bros. Film Productions Germany; Feine Filme
- Distributed by: Warner Bros. Pictures
- Release date: 18 December 2018
- Running time: 100 minutes
- Country: Germany
- Language: German
- Box office: $31 million

All About Me (German: Der Junge muss an die frische Luft) is a 2018 German biographical film based on the eponymous book by Hape Kerkeling.

== Synopsis ==
After the suicide of Hape Kerkeling's mother, his grandparents bring him up.

== Cast ==
- Julius Weckauf as Hans-Peter Kerkeling
- Luise Heyer as Margret
- Sönke Möhring as Heinz
- Ursula Werner as Bertha
- Joachim Król as Willi
