= The Silent Forest (2022 film) =

German film by Saralisa Volm and Ingo Fliess

- English movie poster
- German: Schweigend steht der Wald
- Directed by: Saralisa Volm
- Written by: Wolfram Fleischhauer
- Produced by: Saralisa Volm, Ingo Fliess
- Starring: Henriette Confurius; Noah Saavedra; Robert Stadlober; August Zirner
- Release date: 16 February 2022
- Running time: 95 minutes
- Country: Germany
- Language: German

The Silent Forest ((in German) Schweigend steht der Wald) is a 2022 German film directed by Saralisa Volm in her feature directorial debut and based on a 2013 German book of the same name by Wolfram Fleischhauer, who also wrote the film's screenplay.

The story revolves around a trainee forester who notices parallels between a murder in the forest and the mysterious disappearance of her father twenty years ago. The film was shot in Weiden in der Oberpfalz over 25 days, in April and May 2021. It premiered at the 72nd Berlin International Film Festival on 16 February 2022, in the Perspective on German Cinema (Perspektive Deutsches Kino) section of the festival. The lead cast includes Henriette Confurius, Christina Baumer, Johanna Bittenbinder, Christoph Jungmann, Günther Brenner, Moritz Katzmair, Johannes Herrschmann, Robert Stadlober, Noah Saavedra, August Zirner, Astrid Polak, and Anita Eichhorn.

Süddeutsche Zeitung called the film an impressive and confident directing debut for Volm, making her one of the most genuine and promising voices in German cinema.

The film is distributed internationally through Blue Fox Entertainment.
