= Luise Heyer =

German actress (born 1985)

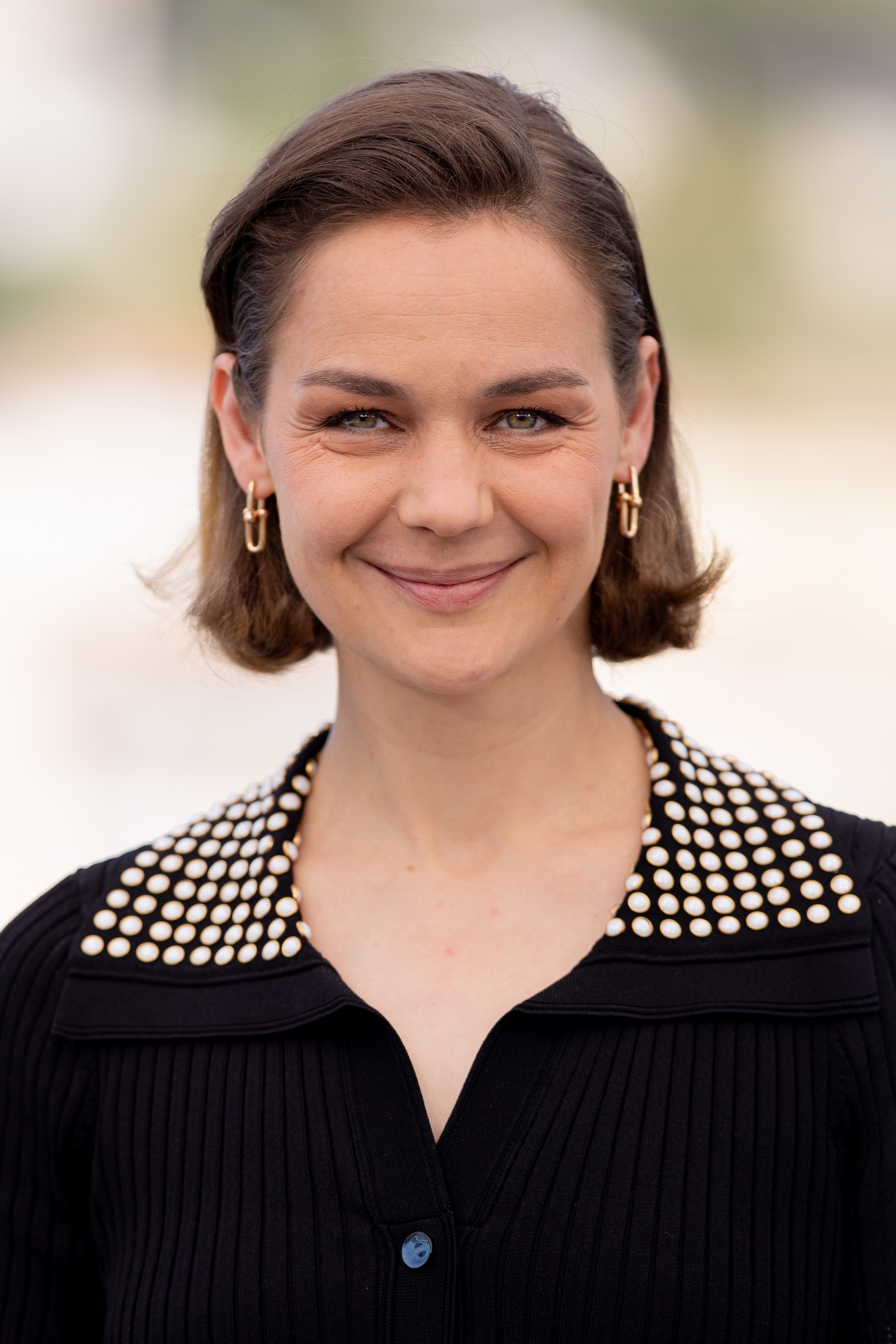
- Heyer in 2025
- Born: 25 March 1985 (age 41); East Berlin, East Germany
- Occupation: Actress
- Years active: 2011–present
- Known for: Dark

Luise Heyer (born 25 March 1985) is a German actress.

== Biography ==
Heyer grew up in Berlin. During her school years, she lived in Denmark for a year. From 2006 until 2010, she attended Rostock University of Music and Theatre in Mecklenburg, where she studied acting. In 2010, she joined the Dortmund Theatre, where she stayed for two years. She was voted best actress in the 2012 season at the Dortmund Theatre.

In 2011, she played her first leading role in the feature film Westwind, portraying the East German rower Isabel, whose twin sister falls in love with a West German man during a stay in Hungary. In 2014, she played Sanna in Edward Berger's film Jack, which was part of the 2014 Berlinale. In 2015, she acted in Rosa von Praunheim's film Tough Love.

In 2016, she had a leading role in the film Fado. Since 2017, Heyer has appeared in the Netflix original series Dark as Doris Tiedemann.

In 2019, Heyer was awarded the rare honor of a double nomination at the German Film Awards. She was noted both for the main role of a rape victim in The Most Beautiful Couple and for her supporting role in All About Me. For this, she received the 2019 German Film Award in the Best Female Supporting Role category. In the same year, she received the Bambi Award in the National Actress category for both roles.

== Selected filmography ==
=== Film ===
List of film appearances, with year, title, and role shown
Year	Title	Role
2011	Westwind	Isabel
2014	Jack	Sanna
2015	Tough Love	Marion
2016	Fado	Doro
2016	All of a Sudden	Judith
2018	The Most Beautiful Couple	Liv
2018	All About Me	Margret
2021	Commitment Phobia	Ghost
2024	The Sparrow in the Chimney	Liv
2025	The Calendar Killer	Klara

=== Television ===
List of television appearances, with year, title, and role shown
Year	Title	Role	Notes
2013	Leipzig Homicide		1 episode
2013	Terra X	Louise of Mecklenburg-Strelitz	1 episode
2014	Bella Block	Sandra Lehnhoff	1 episode
2015	Polizeiruf 110	Nadja Brun	1 episode
2015	Der Kriminalist		1 episode
2015	Homeland		1 episode
2016	Die Chefin		1 episode
2016, 2017	Tatort	Nicki Lowkow / Stella Harms	2 episodes
2017—2020	Dark	Doris Tiedemann	5 episodes
