= Klaus J. Behrendt =

German actor

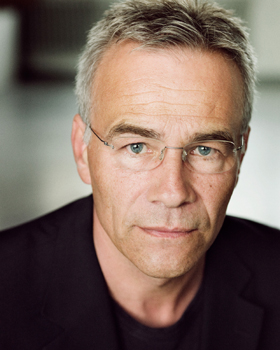
- Behrendt in 2012
- Born: Klaus Johannes Behrendt; 7 February 1960 (age 66); Hamm, West Germany
- Occupation: Actor
- Years active: 1988–present
- Spouse: Karin

Klaus Johannes Behrendt (born 7 February 1960) is a German actor. Since 1992 he has starred in the Westdeutscher Rundfunk version of the popular television crime series Tatort; he also starred in the 2008 film Die Bienen – Tödliche Bedrohung.

== Life and education ==
Behrendt was born in Hamm, North Rhine-Westphalia, the son of a pediatrician, he grew up in Ibbenbüren in North Rhine-Westphalia, where he trained as a mining mechanic. After completing his civil service, he then took acting lessons from 1981 to 1984 at the Hamburg drama school stage studio with Hedi Höpfner (another actress) and then joined a festival engagement at the Theater Bremen. He performed there until 1988 in various works, including Danton's Death (by Georg Büchner), The Seagull (Chekov), A Midsummer Night's Dream (Shakespeare) and Three Sisters (Chekov).

== Career ==
Behrendt launched his television career in 1989, with a role in the television series Rote Erde as Jupp Kowalla.

Behrendt gained great popularity from 1992 to 1994 and then from 1997 onward with his role as investigator Max Ballauf in the WDR crime series Tatort. He was initially an assistant to Kommissar Flemming (Martin Lüttge) in Düsseldorf, later he was an investigative unit leader with his colleague Freddy Schenk (Dietmar Bär) in Cologne. In the 1990 Tatort episode 234 (Schimanski's weapon) Behrendt previously had a supporting role as Erwin Spilonska.

From 1995 to 1997, Behrendt appeared in the Sat.1 series A.S. the leading role of private investigator Alexander Stein, in 29 episodes. In the Sat.1 television movie production The Miracle of Lengede (or A Light in Dark Places), Behrendt appeared as a miner, his original profession. The film, directed by Kaspar Heidelbach, won a Grimme Award in 2004.

In the spring of 2005, Behrendt played the lead role in the ZDF television series Kanzleramt, as the fictional Chancellor Andreas Weyer. In 2006, he acted again with his colleague and friend Dietmar Bär in Der Untergang der Pamir (The Sinking of the Pamir) directed by Kaspar Heidelbach, a two-part catastrophe drama on the sinking of the German ship Pamir. In 2007, he played in the ARD television drama Einfache Leute (Simple people) alongside Barbara Auer, as a family man hiding his homosexuality.

Behrendt is a member of the Bundesverband Schauspiel (Federal Association of Acting, BFFS).

== Awards ==
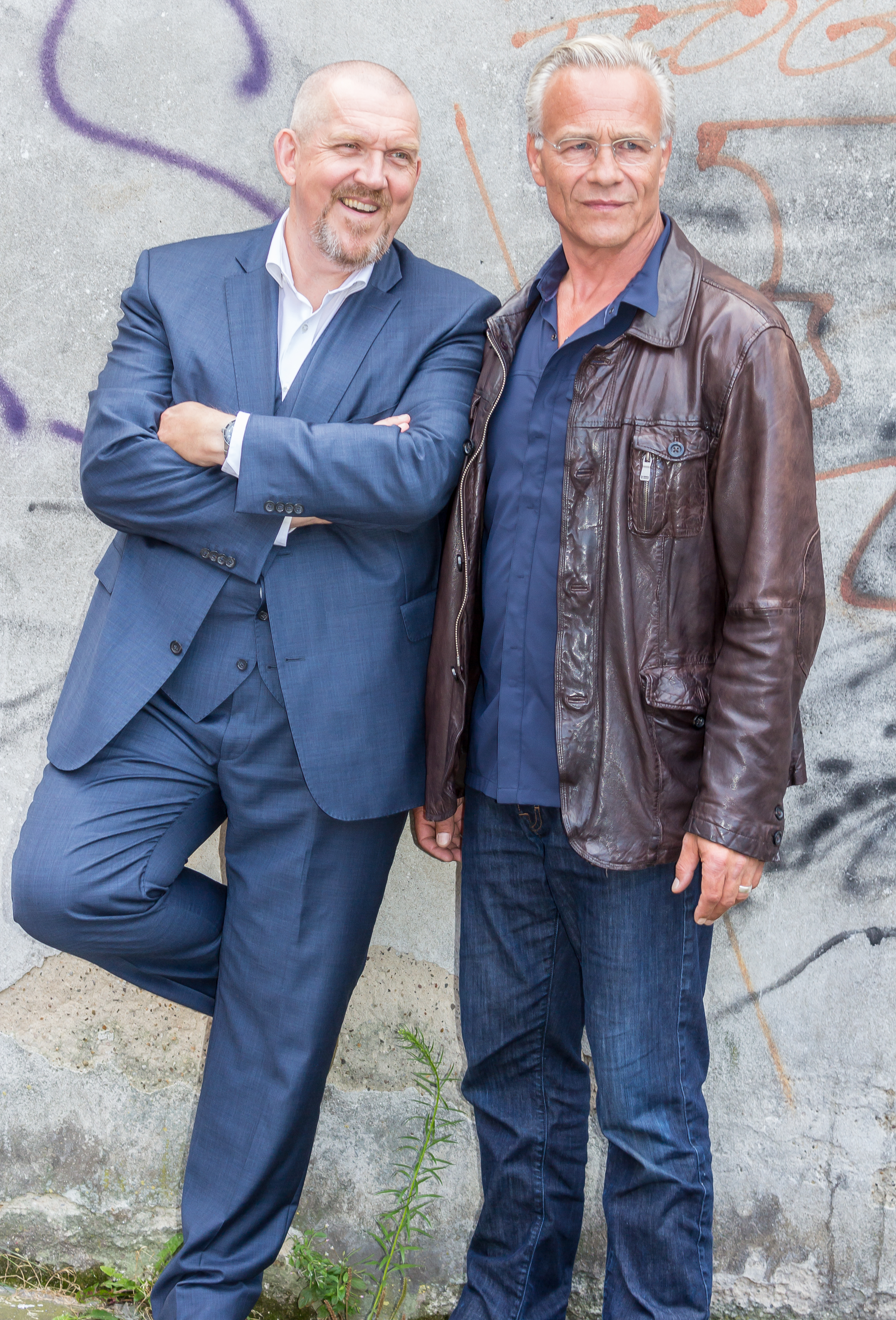
Behrendt (right) and Dietmar Bär of Tatort

For his acting work in Tatort, Behrendt was first awarded in 1998 with the Goldener Gong (magazine TV award) (for the episode Bildersturm). The same episode also received a nomination for the Adolf Grimme Prize. In October 2000, Behrendt and Dietmar Bär received for their roles in Tatort the German Television Award for Best Series Actor of 1999. Two other episodes of Tatort were particularly distinguished; Odin's revenge (or Odins Rache) in 2004 was for the German Television Award and 2004 European Civis Media Award. Then in 2007, the episode Mine Game was nominated for the Marler Media Prize Human Rights award (by the German section of Amnesty International). In 2011, he along with castmates Jan Josef Liefers, Axel Prahl and Dietmar Bär received a 1Live crown (German music award).

For his performance in the television film (directed by Andreas Kleinert) Mein Vater (Coming Home) alongside Götz George, Behrendt received the Audience Award of the Marl Group at the Adolf Grimme Prize and the Bavarian Television Award in 2003. In addition, the film was awarded the International Emmy Award for best TV movie.

Since 2005, Behrendt has been the patron of the 'Honorary Brand' of the Bund Deutscher Kriminalbeamter (the League of German Detective or German Criminal Investigation Association). In 2009, he received a nomination for the Golden Camera as Best Actor. In 2015, Behrendt and Dietmar Bär were awarded the Order of Merit of North Rhine-Westphalia for their social commitment. In 2018, Behrendt and Bär were awarded the Rhineland Medal of the LVR for their services to the cultural development and promotion of the Rhineland.

== Personal life ==
Behrendt has two sons and a daughter from his first marriage, and lives with his second wife Karin and her son from a previous relationship in Berlin-Charlottenburg. His son Tom was a German national team rugby player in 2016, and played with FC St. Pauli Rugby.

== Partial filmography ==
- 1986: Großstadtrevier (TV Series)
- 1988: Ein Treffen mit Rimbaud – Thomas
- 1989–1993: Schulz & Schulz (TV Series) – Seibt
- 1990-2019: Tatort (TV Series) – Max Ballauf / Erwin Spilonska
- 1991-2010: Ein Fall für zwei (TV Series) – Dr. Fritsch / Martin Sutter / Klaus Hencke / Walter Schultheis
- 1992: Elenya – Franz
- 1993: Polski Crash (TV Movie) – Tom Konnitz
- 1993: Leo und Charlotte (TV Movie) – Leo
- 1995–1998: A.S. (TV Series) – Alexander Stein
- 1996: Fähre in den Tod (TV Movie) – Jonny
- 1996: Die Spur der roten Fässer – Wirt
- 1997: Ein Vater unter Verdacht (TV Movie) – Roman Bach
- 1998: Ferkel Fritz (TV Movie) – Martin
- 1998: Kai Rabe gegen die Vatikankiller – Bernd Krüger
- 1999: Verratene Freundschaft – Ein Mann wird zur Gefahr (TV Movie) – Ulf Danner
- 2003: Mein Vater (TV Movie) – Jochen Esser
- 2003: A Light in Dark Places (TV Movie) – Pit Spieker
- 2004: Die Stunde der Offiziere (TV Movie documentary) – Oberst von Gersdorff
- 2005: Kanzleramt (TV Series) – Bundeskanzler Andreas Weyer
- 2005: Das Gespenst von Canterville (TV Movie) – Jochen Brenner
- 2006: Der Untergang der Pamir (TV Movie) – Boatswain Acki Lüders
- 2007: Einfache Leute (TV Movie) – Bademeister Henrik Bode
- 2007: Raging Inferno (TV Movie) – Horst Strasser
- 2007: Jakobs Bruder – Jakob Goldt
- 2008: Guter Junge (TV Movie) – Achim Maas
- 2008: Die Bienen – Tödliche Bedrohung (TV Movie) – Hans Bergmann
- 2009: Fünf Tage Vollmond (TV Movie) – Anton Brunner
- 2010: Unpunished (TV Movie) – Lukas Dorwald
- 2010: Wie ein Licht in der Nacht (TV Movie) – Horst Keller
- 2011: World Express – Atemlos durch Mexiko (TV Movie) – Franz Joseph Anson
- 2011: Isenhart: The Hunt Is on for Your Soul (TV Movie) – Sydal von Friedberg
- 2012: Year of the Dragon (TV Movie) – Thomas Eichner
- 2012: Rommel (TV Movie) – General Guderian
- 2012: Der Staatsanwalt (TV Series) – Karsten Wippermann / Robert Limmer
- 2015: Letzte Spur Berlin (TV Series) – Christian Wagner
- 2016: Liebe am Fjord (TV Series) – Henrik Jacobsen
