= Hotel Desire =

2011 German erotic short drama film

Hotel Desire is a 2011 German erotic short drama film written and directed by Sergej Moya. It follows a morning and the life of a single mother in Berlin who is trying to manage her life with balancing with care for her young son, but facing difficulties and almost forgot her personal needs during managing the consequences of her own life. Her job is in a hotel, she is spending her life with no expectations for herself and spent almost 7 years with no man in her life after having separated from her child's father. Suddenly a VIP person who is staying the same hotel she is doing her work and he appears in front of her in unusual way. She is unable to resist her feelings which have already been locked in for seven years. The film features scenes of Volm and Schick engaging in unsimulated sex.

== Plot ==
At the last minute, single mother Antonia puts her seven-year-old son on the bus which will take him to France for a vacation with his father and then turns up late for her work as a chambermaid in a luxury hotel. Most of the other staff are hostile over her casual attitude except one girl who, finding her in tears in the changing room, is sympathetic. Among her problems, Antonia says she has not been with a man for years, which her co-worker advises her to put right at the first opportunity.

Doing her rounds, Antonia comes into the apparently empty room of a single man, who bursts naked and wet out of the bathroom to answer his phone. She stands frozen while he talks and then starts looking for his clothes, upon which she realises he is blind. Searching for his shoes, he finds her feet and in silence starts exploring her body. She slowly responds, and soon the couple are busy making love. Lying hot and happy on the bed afterwards, he lights a cigarette and the sprinkler in the ceiling soaks them both.

== Cast ==
- Saralisa Volm as Antonia, the chambermaid
- Clemens Schick as Julius, the blind guest

== Production ==
In this film, the main actors Saralisa Volm and Clemens Schick appeared fully nude performing explicit sex like a handjob and cunnilingus. Body doubles stepped in for the penetration scenes.
