= Der Tod ist kein Beinbruch =

- Starring: Stephanie Überall; Gerburg Jahnke
- Country of origin: Germany

Der Tod ist kein Beinbruch is a German television series.

== See also ==
- List of German television series
