= Horst Schimanski =

Character in the German television series Tatort

- Tatort; Schimanski character
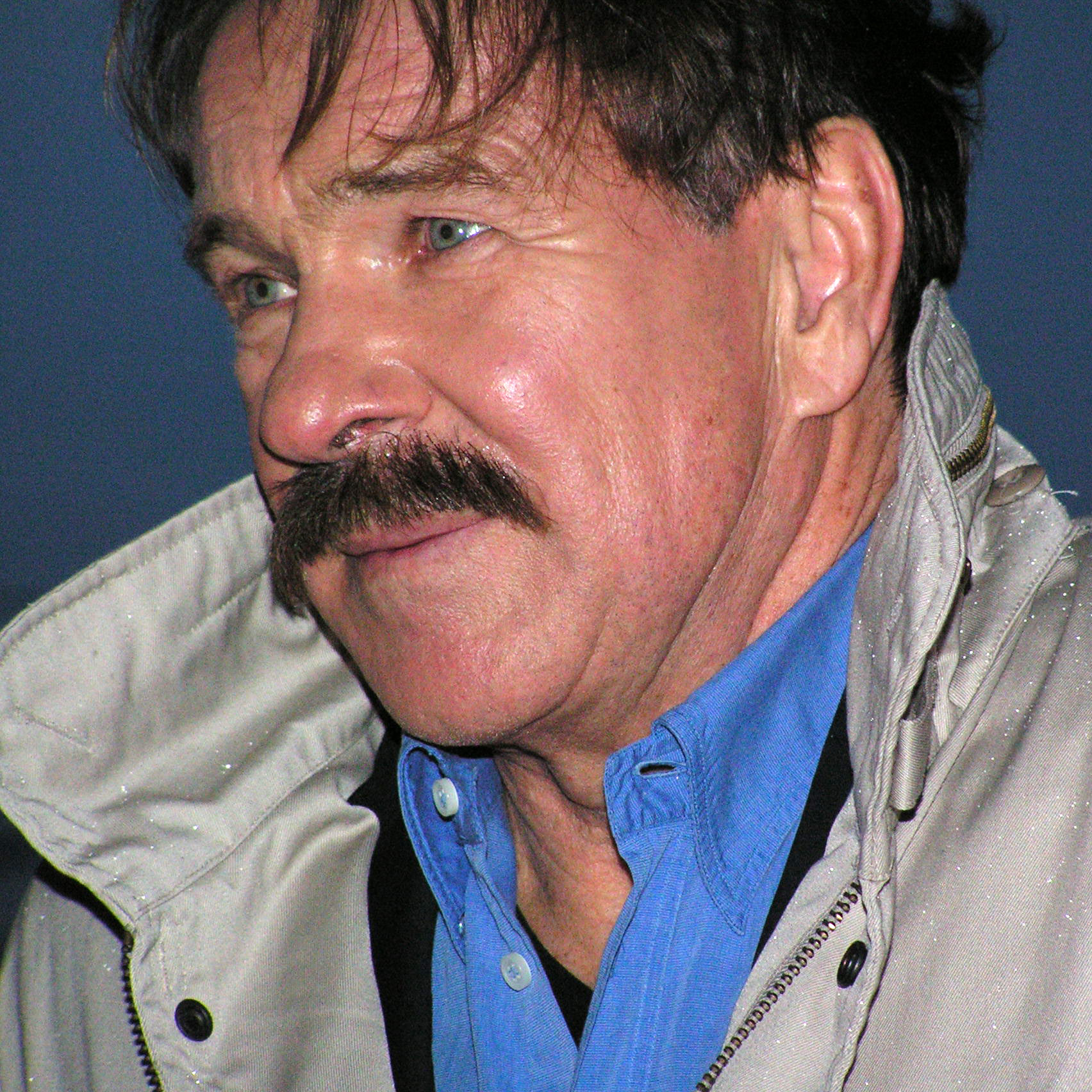
- Götz George as Horst Schimanski, 2007
- First appearance: "Duisburg-Ruhrort"; Tatort; 1981
- Last appearance: "Loverboy"; Schimanski; 2013
- Created by: Bernd Schwamm; Martin Gies; Hajo Gies; Götz George
- Portrayed by: Götz George

In-universe information
- Full name: Horst Karl Georg Schimanski
- Occupation: Homicide detective
- Affiliation: Duisburg police department
- Significant other: Marie-Claire
- Origin: Szczecin, Poland
- Nationality: German

Horst Schimanski is a fictional homicide detective with a leading role in the German crime television series Tatort, as well as the spin-off Schimanski. Portrayed by Götz George, the character made his debut in the 1981 episode "Duisburg-Ruhrort" and appeared in 29 episodes until 1991. Two episodes, On the Killer's Track (1985) and The Crack Connection (1987), were released in cinemas before they were aired on television. Also notable is the episode "Unter Brüdern" from 1990, which was produced as a crossover with the East German Polizeiruf 110 crime series, in which Schimanski collaborated with two colleagues from the East German Volkspolizei. In 1997, the character got his own show, the loose spin-off Schimanski. In this series, Schimanski is a retired police officer living in Belgium with his longtime girlfriend Marie Claire.

== Background ==
Schimanski is consistently presented as the prototypical proletarian, living very close to the criminals he pursues. Consequently, many of his cases deal with underprivileged victims and upper-class criminals, or at least suspects, which was a rather uncommon concept in West German television shows of that era. Born and raised in the industrial city of Duisburg in the Ruhr area, Schimanski is a rugged, often unkempt simple man (unsophisticated, yet not unintelligent), who often swears but never backs out of a fight, and doesn't disrespect minorities. In the majority of episodes, he wears a well-worn grey or beige M-65 field jacket with cropped epaulettes that became famous in Germany as the "Schimanski Jacket".

In the original Tatort episodes, he is perennially accompanied by Christian Thanner, a reticent, soft, well-dressed and well-educated detective who often serves as a foil to the gruff Schimanski. In the first episode of the follow-up series Schimanski, Thanner is killed by a rogue police officer. This was necessary as Eberhard Feik, who played Thanner, had died in the hiatus of the series. Schimanski's other long-term colleague and companion in both series, Dutchman Hans Scherpenzeel van Maaskant-Schoutens (abbreviated as Hänschen, i.e. Little Hans), was played by Chiem van Houweninge, a Dutch actor and playwright who also wrote several episodes.

After leaving the police force in 1991, Schimanski emigrates to Belgium. There he meets his partner Marie-Claire (Denise Virieux), and they live together on a houseboat. He works as a boxing trainer. After Thanner is murdered in 1997, Schimanski is called back to Duisburg for the first time by the Düsseldorf public prosecutor's office. As a freelance investigator, he is in charge of solving Thanner's murder.

== Reception ==
From the beginning, Schimanski's character polarized the public: WDR stated that his critics saw him as a disgrace to the police and to German television, while his admirers perceived him as a new breed of more realistic, streetwise characters: "for some, he was the fighter for justice and became a cult character; for others, he was more of a lawbreaker with a grubby aura". In time, he became a cult figure in German culture and the most popular Tatort character.
