= Diamantendetektiv Dick Donald =

- Starring: Götz George
- Country of origin: Germany
- No. of seasons: 1
- No. of episodes: 13

Production
- Running time: 25

Original release
- Release: 1971

Diamantendetektiv Dick Donald is a German television series.

== See also ==
- List of German television series
