= Kanzleramt (TV series) =

German television series

- Title card
- Created by: Hans-Christoph Blumenberg; Martin E. Süskind
- Starring: Klaus J. Behrendt; Robert Atzorn; Herbert Knaup
- Country of origin: Germany
- No. of seasons: 1
- No. of episodes: 12

Production
- Running time: 45 minutes

Original release
- Network: ZDF
- Release: 23 March – 29 June 2005

Kanzleramt (engl: "Chancellery") is a German serial political drama television series created by Hans-Christoph Blumenberg and Martin E. Süskind that was originally broadcast on ZDF from 23 March to 29 June 2005. The show is based on the template of the American TV series The West Wing.

The series is set primarily in the office of fictional Chancellor of Germany Andreas Weyer (Klaus J. Behrendt), telling stories about the German head of government's political career and private life as a widower and father of a teenage daughter. "Chancellery is entertaining, exciting and interesting," said Friedrich Bohl (CDU), former chief of the Federal chancellery. Compared with the multi-award winning US template The West Wing, Chancellery appeared to most critics but rather shallow and trivial. It was written by the former speechwriter of German statesman Willy Brandt, Martin E. Süskind, but they deemed unrealistic.

It was neither a critical nor ratings success, and was cancelled after twelve episodes. It opened with 4.87 million viewers (market share of 15.2 percent), but the viewing numbers dropped relatively quickly to 1.5 to 1.7 million.

== Plot ==
German Chancellor Andreas Weyer has many problems. It does not matter whether the Russian president does not want to return images that disappeared during the Second World War, whether he is suffering from back pain or if the German ambassador to Turkey is being shot. Privately Witwer Weyer lives with his 17-year-old daughter Nina, who has fallen in love with a salsa dancer.

== Cast ==
- Klaus J. Behrendt as Andreas Weyer, Chancellor of Germany
- Robert Atzorn as Norbert Kraft, head of the chancellery
- Herbert Knaup as Conny Bergmann, spokesperson of the Federal Government
- Claudia Michelsen as Edith Lambert, head of department foreign policy
- Rita Russek as Birte Schmitz, head of the chancellery office
- Heikko Deutschmann as Alexander Nachtweih, speechwriter of the Chancellor
- Karoline Teska as Nina Weyer, daughter of the Chancellor
- Gabriela Maria Schmeide as Dr. Christa Templin, doctor of the Chancellor
