= Götz George =

German actor (1938–2016)

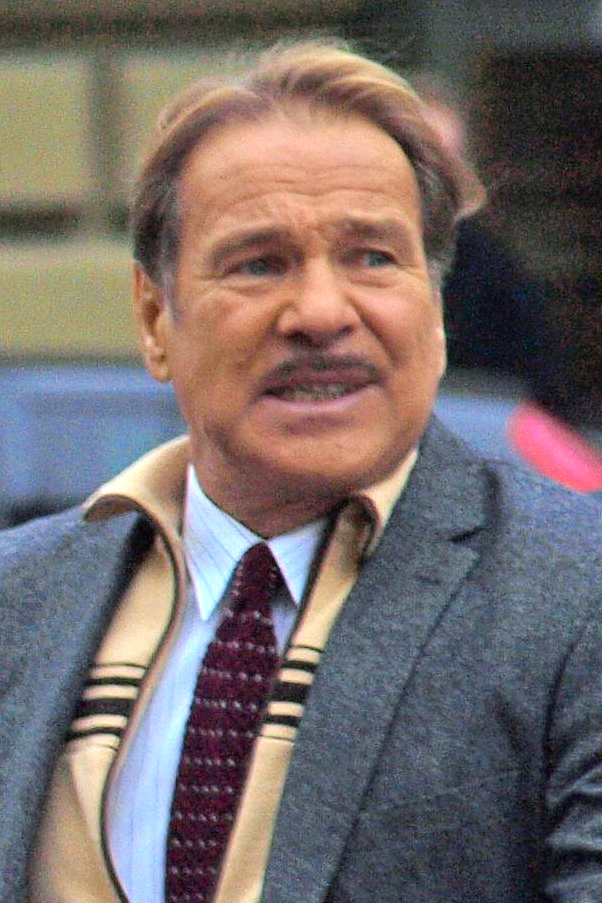
- George in 2009
- Born: 23 July 1938; Berlin, Germany
- Died: 19 June 2016 (aged 77); Hamburg, Germany
- Occupation: Actor
- Years active: 1950–2016
- Spouses: Loni von Friedl (m. 1966; div. 1976) Marika Ullrich (m. 2014)
- Children: 1
- Parents: Heinrich George (father); Berta Drews (mother)

Götz George (German pronunciation: [ɡœts geˈɔɐ̯ gə]; 23 July 1938 – 19 June 2016) was a German actor, the son of actor couple Berta Drews and Heinrich George. His arguably best-known role is that of Duisburg detective Horst Schimanski in the TV crime series Tatort.

== Early life ==
George was born in Berlin-Wannsee in 1938, into a well known acting family; his father, Heinrich George, was a famous film and theater actor, and his mother, Berta Drews, a character actress. George is named after the German 16th-century Imperial Knight Götz von Berlichingen, which was also his father's favourite stage role. His father was imprisoned by the Soviets after the Second World War and died in 1946 after an appendectomy in the Soviet NKVD special camp Nr. 7 (on the site of the former Sachsenhausen concentration camp), with his death likely hastened by starvation. George grew up in Berlin with his elder brother Jan and his mother. He attended school in Berlin-Lichterfelde and later attended the Lyzeum Alpinum in Zuoz, Switzerland.

== Career ==
=== Stage ===
George made his stage debut in 1950, performing a role in William Saroyan's My Heart's in the Highlands. From 1955 to 1958 he also studied at the Berlin UFA-Nachwuchsstudio ('Young Talent Studio'), though he received the crucial part of his acting education between 1958 and 1963. Following his mother's advice he occasionally played at the Deutsches Theater in Göttingen under the direction of Heinz Hilpert. After Hilpert's death, George would never join a fixed theater company again, although he did regularly perform on tours and as a guest performer.

In 1972 Hansgünther Heyme signed George to the Kölner Schauspielhaus, where he played Martin Luther in Dieter Forte's Martin Luther und Thomas Münzer. His most important stage achievement, in his own opinion, was the lead role as Georges Danton in Georg Büchner's drama Danton's Death during the Salzburg Festival in 1981. In 1986 and 1987, George, together with Eberhard Feik and Helmut Stauss, stage-managed Gogol's The Government Inspector. Performing in Anton Chekhov's Platonov, George went on his last theater tour.

=== Cinema and television ===
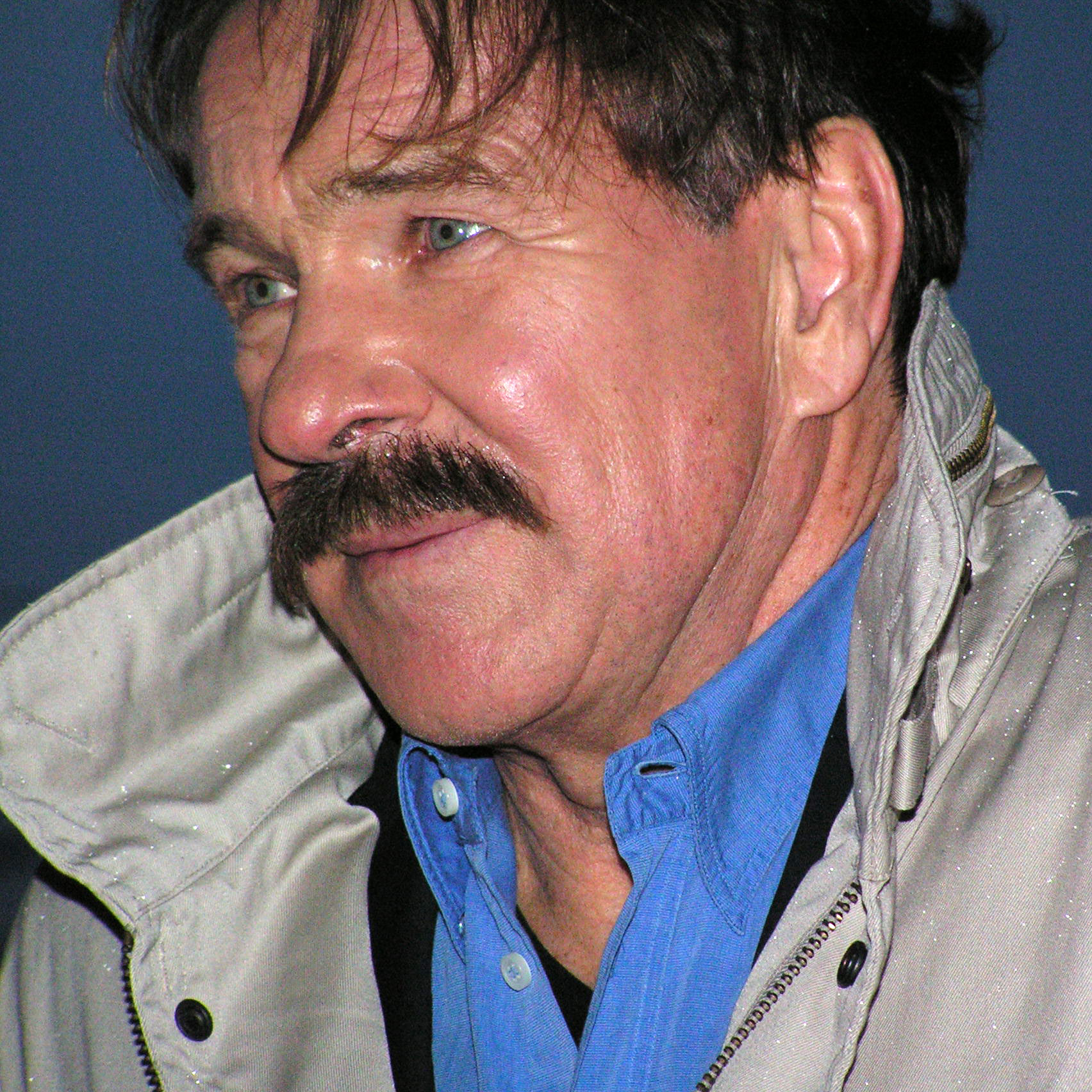
George in his role as Horst Schimanski in 2009

In 1953, George was able to get a small film role next to Romy Schneider in When the White Lilacs Bloom Again. In the same year he played, as he would often do from then on, next to his mother, in Shakespeare's Richard III. After small movie parts during the 1950s, George broke through with audiences and critics in the film Jacqueline (1959). George was awarded the Bundesfilmpreis and the Preis der Filmkritik for his role. In 1962 he received the Bambi Award as the most popular actor.

In the 1960s, George got the chance to show that he was able to do more than playing sappy peasants, through roles in movies such as The Fair (1960), playing a desperate deserter from the Wehrmacht during the Second World War; and Destination Death (1964). More often, though, he performed in comedies and action-oriented movies which benefited from his physical presence. He became well known to a broad audience when, during his theater tour in Göttingen, Horst Wendlandt persuaded him to play in one of the Karl May series of films, which he started in 1962 with Treasure of Silver Lake. The original plan was to give him the lead role, but this plan was abandoned when Lex Barker was hired to play the role of Old Shatterhand, so George played the farmer son Fred Engel. George performed all stunts himself, even in his lead role as sheriff in Man Called Gringo (1965).

In the 1970s, he turned primarily to stage roles and to television, including the many episodes of Der Kommissar, Tatort, Derrick, and The Old Fox for which he would become famous. It was not until 1977 that he was cast in a prominent movie role again, appearing in Death Is My Trade as Franz Lang, a character modeled after Auschwitz concentration camp commander Rudolf Höß.

George probably had his greatest popular success in the 1980s on TV: in Tatort episodes of the WDR, broadcast from 1981 to 1991, he portrayed working-class police officer Horst Schimanski, who eventually became a cult figure in Germany. In 1984 and 1987 he again won the Bambi Award as the most popular actor. The series of Schulz & Schulz movies, starting in 1989 and dealing with the issue of the German reunification, gave him the opportunity to show his talents as a comedian in a double role, as did the role of the industry consultant Morlock in the series of the same name, which is rather far removed from the roughneck charm of senior commissar Schimanski.

Among George's most impressive roles in the 1990s were his appearances in the television movie Der Sandmann ('The Sandman'), in which he portrayed the alleged serial killer and writer Henry Kupfer as a cold, calculating and manipulative intellectual; the movie Deathmaker (Der Totmacher), in which he portrayed Fritz Haarmann (The Butcher of Hanover); and in the television movie The Bubi Scholz Story (based on Bubi Scholz), the trauma of an aged, broken boxer.

== Personal life and death ==
George was married to Loni von Friedl from 1966 to 1976; the couple's daughter, Tanja-Nicole, was born in 1967. From 1997, he lived together with Hamburg journalist Marika Ullrich; the couple married in 2014.

George died in 2016 at the age of 77 after a short illness.

== Awards ==
- 1995: Bavarian Film Award, Best Actor
- 1995: Volpi Cup, Best Actor

== Filmography (movies) ==
- When the White Lilacs Bloom Again, 1953 ... Klaus
- The Great Test, 1954 ... Peter Behrend
- Old Barge, Young Love (Alter Kahn und junge Liebe a.k.a. Sonne über den Seen), 1957 ... Kalle Borchert
- As Long as the Heart Still Beats, 1958 ... Eberhard Römer
- Jacqueline, 1959 ... Gustav Bäumler
- The Fair (Kirmes), 1960 ... Robert Mertens
- Carnival Confession, 1960 ... Clemens
- Until Hell Is Frozen, 1961 ... Peter Joost
- Murder Party, 1961 ... Hein Kersten
- Our House in Cameroon, 1961 ... Georg Ambrock
- Her Most Beautiful Day, 1962 ... Adam Kowalski
- Das Mädchen und der Staatsanwalt, 1962 ... Jochen Rehbert
- Treasure of Silver Lake (Der Schatz im Silbersee), 1962 ... Fred Engel
- Hypnosis, 1962 ... Chris Kronberger
- Love Has to Be Learned, 1963 ... Hansgeorg Lehmbruck
- Man and Beast (Mensch und Bestie), 1963 ... Franz
- Destination Death (Herrenpartie), 1964 ... Herbert Hackländer
- Mark of the Tortoise (Wartezimmer zum Jenseits), 1964 ... Don Micklem
- Among Vultures (Unter Geiern), 1964 ... Martin Baumann Jr.
- A Holiday with Piroschka, 1965 ... Thomas Laurends
- Man Called Gringo (Sie nannten ihn Gringo), 1965 ... Mace Carson
- Winnetou and the Crossbreed, 1966 ... Jeff Brown
- The Long Day of Inspector Blomfield, 1968 ... Eddie Blomfield
- The Blood of Fu Manchu, 1968 ... Carl Jansen
- Commandos, 1968 ... Oberleutnant Rudi
- Wind from the East, 1970 ... Soldier
- Death is My Trade, 1977 ... Franz Lang (based on Rudolf Höss)
- Abwärts, 1984 ... Jörg
- On the Killer's Track, 1985 ... Horst Schimanski
- The Crack Connection, 1987 ... Horst Schimanski
- The Cat, 1988 ... Probek
- The Break, 1989 ... Walter Graf
- Blue Eyed, 1989 ... Johann Neudorf
- Schtonk!, 1992 ... Hermann Willié
- Me and Christine, 1993 ... Bruno
- Heaven or Bust, 1995 ... Robot Max
- Deathmaker (Der Totmacher) 1995 ... Fritz Haarmann
- Rossini, 1997 ... Uhu Zigeuner
- The Trio, 1998 ... Zobel
- Solo for Clarinet, 1998 ... Bernie Kominka
- After the Truth (Nichts als die Wahrheit), 1999 ... Dr. Mengele
- Viktor Vogel – Commercial Man, 2001 ... Eddie Kaminsky
- Gott ist tot, 2003 ... Heinrich Lutter
- Maria an Callas, 2006 ... Jost
- Dawn of Evil: Rise of the Reich, 2009 ... Schlomo Herzl
- Zettl, 2012 ... Chancellor Olli Ebert

== Filmography (made-for-TV movies and series) ==
- Kolportage, 1957 ... Erik Stjernenhö
- Alle meine Söhne, 1961 ... Christian Keller
- Alle meine Söhne, 1965 ... Chris Keller
- Der Werbeoffizier, 1967 ... Captain Plume
- Schlehmihls wundersame Geschichte, 1967 ... Peter Schlemihl
- Match, 1968 ... André
- Der Eismann kommt, 1968 ... Rocky Pioggi
- Spion unter der Haube, 1969 ... Cazmio
- Ein Jahr ohne Sonntag, 1969 (TV series, 13 episodes) ... Robert Sonntag
- 11 Uhr 20, 1970 (TV miniseries) ... Mûller
- Der Kommissar: Tod einer Zeugin, 1970 ... Wolfgang Karrass
- Tatort: Blechschaden, 1971 ... Joachim Seidel
- Diamantendetektiv Dick Donald, 1971 (TV series, 13 episodes) ... Dick Donald
- Der Kommissar: Der Amoklauf, 1972 ... Paul Neumann
- Der Illegale, 1972 ... Nikolai Grunwaldt / Kurt Blohm
- Tatort: Rattennest, 1972 ... Jerry
- Kesselflickers Hochzeit, 1972 ... Michael Byrne
- Die Gräfin von Rathenow, 1973 ... Leopold
- Der Kommissar: Sommerpension, 1973 ... Gottfried Schuster
- Zwischen den Flügen, 1973 (TV series, 1 episode)
- Mandragola, 1974 ... Siro
- Tatort: Transit ins Jenseits, 1976 ... Martin
- Hungária kávéház (Café Hungaria), 1977 (TV series, 1 episode) ... Hadnagy
- Polizeiinspektion 1: Verfolgungswahn, 1977 ... Alfred Neumeier
- Les Diamants du président (The Pawn), 1977 (TV miniseries) ... Pierre Vidal
- Vermutungen über Franz Bieberkopf, 1977
- Derrick - Season 5, Episode 10: "Der Spitzel" (1978) ... Georg Lukas
- The Old Fox: Der schöne Alex, 1978 ... Alex Bergemann
- The Old Fox: Der Auftraggeber, 1979 ... Martens
- Les Chevaux du soleil, 1980 (TV series) ... Victor
- Überfall in Glasgow, 1981 ... Craig Kennan
- Tatort: Duisburg-Ruhrort, 1981 ... Horst Schimanski
- Der König und sein Narr, 1981 ... Frederick William I of Prussia
- Dantons Tod, 1981 ... Danton
- Tatort: Grenzgänger, 1981 ... Horst Schimanski
- Tatort: Der unsichtbare Gegner, 1982 ... Horst Schimanski
- Der Regenmacher, 1982 ... Bill Starbuck
- Tatort: Das Mädchen auf der Treppe, 1982 ... Horst Schimanski
- Tatort: Kuscheltiere, 1982 ... Horst Schimanski
- Tatort: Miriam, 1983 ... Horst Schimanski
- Das schöne Ende dieser Welt, 1984 ... Craig Murray
- Tatort: Kielwasser, 1984 ... Horst Schimanski
- Tatort: Zweierlei Blut, 1984 ... Horst Schimanski
- Overheard, 1984 ... Bozidar Popkov-Prokop
- Tatort: Rechnung ohne Wirt, 1984 ... Horst Schimanski
- Tatort: Doppelspiel, 1985 ... Horst Schimanski
- Tatort: Das Haus im Wald, 1985 ... Horst Schimanski
- Tatort: On the Killer's Track, 1985 (theatrically released) ... Horst Schimanski
- Tatort: Der Tausch, 1986 ... Horst Schimanski
- Tatort: Schwarzes Wochenende, 1986 ... Horst Schimanski
- Tatort: Freunde, 1986 ... Horst Schimanski
- Tatort: The Crack Connection, 1987 (theatrically released) ... Horst Schimanski
- Tatort: Spielverderber, 1987 ... Horst Schimanski
- Tatort: Gebrochene Blüten, 1988 ... Horst Schimanski
- Tatort: Einzelhaft, 1988 ... Horst Schimanski
- Tatort: Moltke, 1988 ... Horst Schimanski
- Tatort: Der Pott, 1989 ... Horst Schimanski
- Tatort: Blutspur, 1989 ... Horst Schimanski
- Spielen willst du ja alles. Götz George – rastlos im Einsatz, 1989
- Tatort: Katjas Schweigen, 1989 ... Horst Schimanski
- Schulz & Schulz, 1989 ... Walter Schulz and Wolfgang Schulz
- Tatort: Medizinmänner, 1990 ... Horst Schimanski
- Tatort: Schimanskis Waffe, 1990 ... Horst Schimanski
- Tatort / Polizeiruf 110: Unter Brüdern, 1990 ... Horst Schimanski
- Schulz & Schulz 2: Aller Anfang ist schwer, 1991 ... Walter Schulz and Wolfgang Schulz
- Tatort: Bis zum Hals im Dreck, 1991 ... Horst Schimanski
- Tatort: Kinderlieb, 1991 ... Horst Schimanski
- Tatort: Der Fall Schimanski, 1991 ... Horst Schimanski
- Schulz & Schulz 3: Wechselspiele, 1992 ... Walter Schulz and Wolfgang Schulz
- Schulz & Schulz 4: Neue Welten, alte Lasten, 1992 ... Walter Schulz and Wolfgang Schulz
- Morlock: Kinderkram, 1993 ... Carl Morlock
- Morlock: Die Verflechtung, 1993 ... Carl Morlock
- Morlock: König Midas, 1993 ... Carl Morlock
- Schulz & Schulz 5: Fünf vor zwölf, 1993 ... Walter Schulz and Wolfgang Schulz
- Morlock: Der Tunnel, 1994 ... Carl Morlock
- Das Schwein – Eine deutsche Karriere, 1995 (TV miniseries) ... Stefan Stolze
- Der König von Dulsberg, 1995 ... Bruno Bülle
- Der Sandmann, 1995 ... Henry Kupfer
- Der Mann auf der Bettkante, 1995 ... Jack Förnbeisser
- Tote sterben niemals aus, 1996 ... Benno / Theobald
- Gates of Fire, 1996 ... Harry Kowa
- Schimanski: Die Schwadron, 1997 ... Horst Schimanski
- Schimanski: Blutsbrüder, 1997 ... Horst Schimanski
- Schimanski: Hart am Limit, 1997 ... Horst Schimanski
- Schimanski: Muttertag, 1998 ... Horst Schimanski
- Schimanski: Rattennest, 1998 ... Horst Schimanski
- Schimanski: Geschwister, 1998 ... Horst Schimanski
- The Bubi Scholz Story, 1998/99 ... Bubi Scholz
- Die Entführung, 1999 ... Carl Heidfeld
- Racheengel – Stimme aus dem Dunkeln, 1999 ... Dr. Meinfeld
- Schimanski: Sehnsucht, 1999 ... Horst Schimanski
- Die Spur meiner Tochter (a.k.a. Element des Todes), 1999 ... Paul Flemming
- Schimanski: Tödliche Liebe, 2000 ... Horst Schimanski
- Schimanski: Schimanski muss leiden, 2000 ... Horst Schimanski
- Bargeld lacht, 2001 ... Harry Freundner
- Schimanski: Kinder der Hölle, 2001 ... Horst Schimanski
- Liebe. Macht. Blind., 2001 ... Alexander Stahlberg
- Mein Vater, 2002 ... Richard Esser
- Liebe ist die halbe Miete, 2002 ... Dr. Gottfried Naumann
- Schimanski: Asyl, 2002 ... Horst Schimanski
- Verliebte Diebe, 2002 ... Vinzenz Kröger
- Der Anwalt und sein Gast, 2002 ... Frank Karmann
- Geheimnisvolle Freundinnen, 2003 ... Sandmann
- Familienkreise, 2003 ... Raimund Parz
- Alpenglühen, 2003 ... Hannes Seeger
- René Deltgen – Der sanfte Rebell, 2004
- Schimanski: Das Geheimnis des Golem, 2004 ... Horst Schimanski
- Leaf and Blossom – The Inheritance, 2004 ... Vincent Gottwald
- Alpenglühen zwei – Liebe versetzt Berge, 2005 ... Hannes Seeger
- Under the Dark Sun of Africa, 2005 ... Larry
- Einmal so wie ich will, 2005 ... John Schlesinger
- Intrigue and Love, 2005 ... President von Walter
- Schimanski: Sünde, 2005 ... Horst Schimanski
- Storm Tide, 2006 ... Jens Urban
- Commissario Laurenti: Die Toten vom Karst, 2006 ... Antonio Gubian
- Als der Fremde kam, 2006 ... Dr. Robert Stubenrauch
- Schimanski: Tod in der Siedlung, 2007 ... Horst Schimanski
- Der Novembermann, 2007 ... Henry Lichtfeld
- Die Katze, 2007 ... Siegmar
- Meine fremde Tochter, 2008 ... Johann Bergkamp
- Schimanski: Schicht im Schacht, 2008 ... Horst Schimanski
- Schokolade für den Chef, 2008 ... Ernst Schmitt
- Civil Courage, 2010 ... Peter Jordan
- Keep Lying, Darling, 2010 ... Hape Wegener
- Schimanski: Schuld und Sühne, 2011 ... Horst Schimanski
- Papa allein zu Haus, 2011 ... Theo Winter
- Nachtschicht: Reise in den Tod, 2011 ... Bruno Markowitz
- Night Without Morning, 2011 ... Jasper Dänert
- Death of a Cop, 2012 ... Bruno Theweleit
- Deckname Luna, 2012 ... Prof. Arthur Noswitz
- George, 2013 ... Heinrich George
- Schimanski: Loverboy, 2013 ... Horst Schimanski
- Besondere Schwere der Schuld, 2014 ... Joseph Komalschek
- Böse Wetter – Das Geheimnis der Vergangenheit, 2016 ... Friedrich Türnitz
