= Maximilian Brückner =

German actor (born 1979)

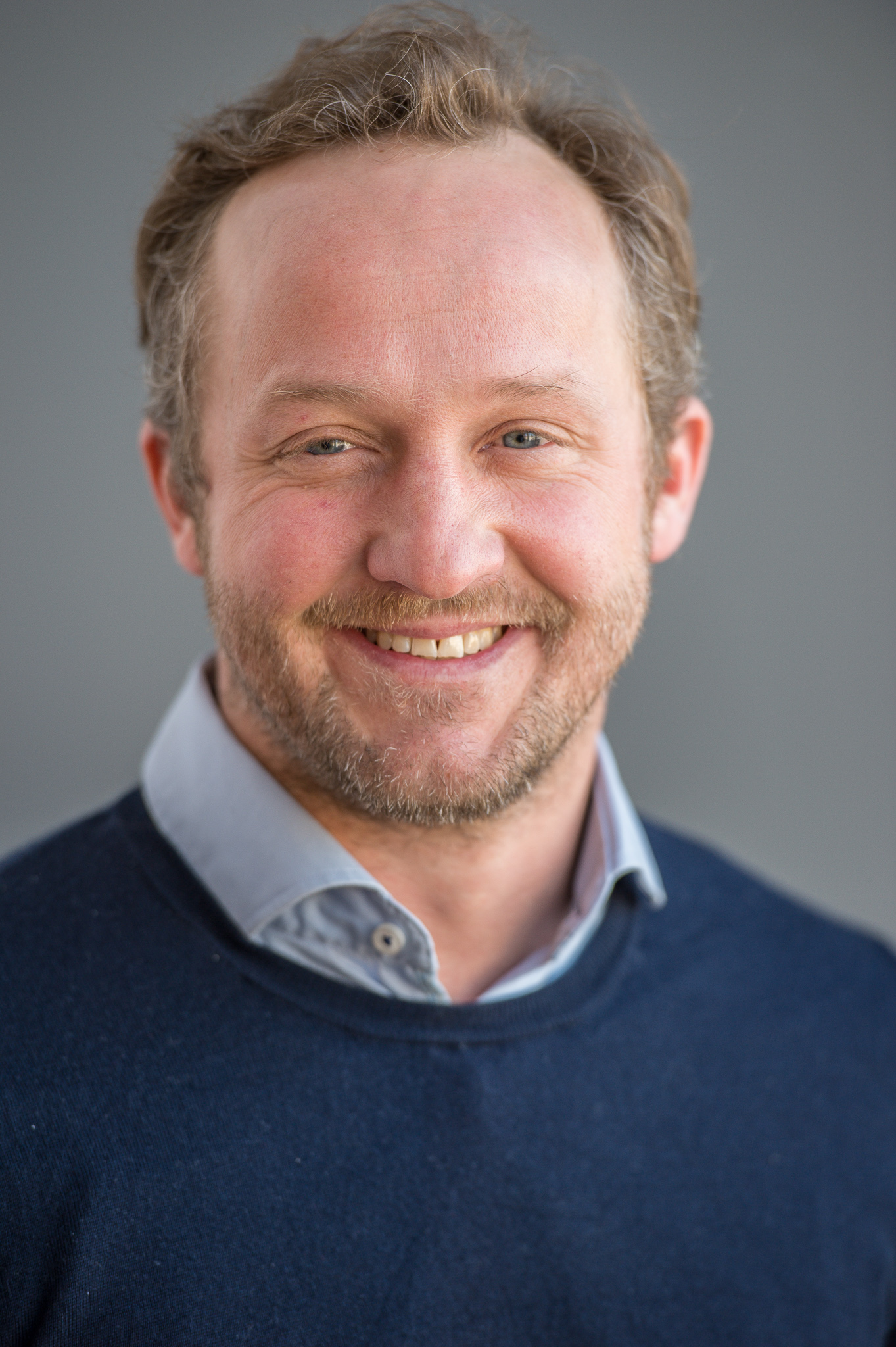
- Maximilian Brueckner in 2017
- Born: 10 January 1979 (age 47); Munich, Bavaria, West Germany
- Occupation: Actor
- Years active: 2001–present
- Spouse: Magdalena Staudacher (m. 2013)
- Children: 1

Maximilian Brückner (born 10 January 1979) is a German actor. He has won numerous awards including the Deutscher Kritikerpreis in 2006 and received a European Shooting Stars Award in 2007.

== Career ==
Brückner graduated from the Otto Falckenberg School in Munich, and received his first engagement at the Munich Volkstheater. He was one of the students selected in 2001 by theater director Christian Stückl for the summer academy for Baierisches Volksschauspiel.

In a new production, Brückner took over the role of Boanlkramer in Kurt Wilhelm's play The Brandner Kaspar and eternal life. Aged 23, he took over the leading role from veteran actor Toni Berger, (1921–2005) who had embodied this in the original staging more than 1000 times. He describes his role as a "blend of Pumuckl, Marilyn Manson and Gollum of The Lord of the Rings. The Boanlkramer is not stupid. He's like a little kid given power over an army".

Since 2003, Brückner has also appeared in numerous film and television productions. In 2004, he played 'the Mammon' in Everyman at the Salzburg Festival. Then in October 2006, he worked together with Gregor Weber (as Stephan Deininger) on Tatort as crime scene investigator Franz Kappl, broadcast on Saarland Radio. After the filming of the seventh episode (broadcast in January 2012), the contracts with the actor was not renewed. He did not like his overambitious character. In 2012, Brückner had a small role as a German officer in Steven Spielberg's war epic War Horse.

He has made numerous stage appearances in the theatre including at Münchner Volkstheater since 2002, with Die Räuber (Karl Moor), Der Räuber Kneißl (as Mathias Kneißl, based on Mathias Kneißl's life), Der Brandner Kaspar und das ewig' Leben (Boandlkramer), Baumeister Solness (by Ibsen) in 2017, and Peer Gynt (as Peer), all directed by Christian Stückl. He made his directorial debut, also at the Münchner Volkstheater, in 2012 with Ludwig Thoma's play Magdalena, with his brother Florian Brückner in the lead.

== Personal life ==
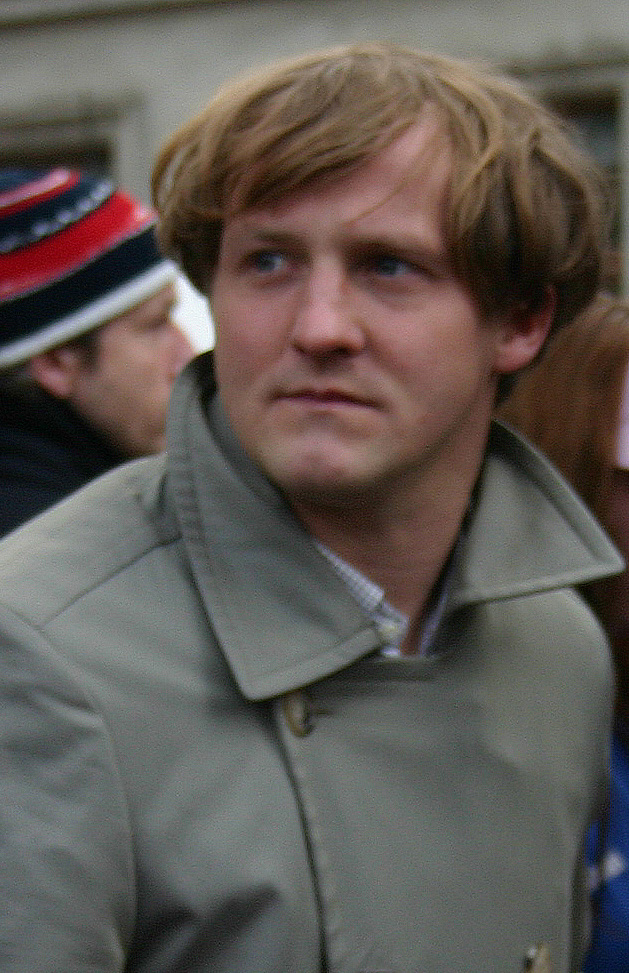
Brückner in 2006 n the set of TV-Movie "Mein alter Freund Fritz"

Brückner lives with his two brothers (he has seven younger siblings) and parents on a farm in Chiemgau in Upper Bavaria. The family renovated the farmhouse in 2011, with Maximilian doing a lot of plastering. He has been married to Magdalena Staudacher since 2013, they have one child. He dances Schuhplattler and plays the tuba in a local brass band with his brothers. His brothers are Florian Brückner, Dominic Brückner and Franz Xaver Brückner and his sisters are Susanne Brückner and Isabella Brückner are all actors. With Florian, he played in the film Räuber Kneißl and then in Was weg is, is weg ('What's gone, is gone'), Christian Lerch's directorial debut shot in 2011, with Florian and Franz Xaver. As three brothers Paul, Lukas and Hansi.

Politically, he is a supporter of the Christian Social Union of Bavaria. In March 2008, Maximilian Brückner was elected at the local elections in Bavaria for the CSU municipal council in his hometown of Riedering, in the district of Rosenheim. However, due to his change of residence, he has returned this mandate.

== Filmography ==
=== Film ===
Year	Title	Role	Notes
2003	Männer wie wir	Ecki	(English title Guys and Balls)
2004	Alone	Jan	(Allein)
2005	Sophie Scholl – Die letzten Tage	Willi Graf	
2006	Rabenbrüder	Jojo	
2006	Heavyweights	Reporter Robert	
2006	Wer früher stirbt ist länger tot ('Grave Decisions')	Verkäufer Musikgeschäft, a salesman in the music shop	brother Franz-Xaver Brückner has main role as 'Franz Schneider'
2008	Come In and Burn Out	Sascha Wegemann	
2008	Cherry Blossoms ('Kirschblüten – Hanami')	Karl Angermeier	
2008	Räuber Kneißl	Mathias Kneißl	
2010	Freche Mädchen 2	Josef	
2011	Resturlaub	Peter 'Pitschi' Greulich	
2011	Rubbeldiekatz	Basti Honk	(known in English as Woman in Love)
2011	War Horse	German Artillery Officer	Billed as Maximilian Brüeckner
2012	Was weg is, is weg	Hansi Baumgarten	
2013	Welcome to Bavaria	Bernie	(Short)
2013	Spieltrieb	Szymon Smutek	(English title Gaming Instinct)
2013	Und Äktschn	Alfons Pospiech, Neffe von Hans	
2018	The Most Beautiful Couple	Malte	

=== Television ===
Year	Title	Role	Notes
2002	Café Meineid	Tom Kurowski	TV series, 1 episode
2003	Männer häppchenweise	Assistant to the police councilor	TV film
2004	Jedermann	Mammon	TV film
2005	Fünf-Sterne-Kerle inklusive	Julian Ehrlich	TV film
2005	Tatort – Tod auf der Walz	Gerry Neuner	TV series episode
2006	Mozart – Ich hätte München Ehre gemacht	Carl Albert	
2006	Papa und Mama	Thomas Hupach	TV film, 2 episodes
2006	Tatort – Aus der Traum	Kriminalhauptkommissar Franz Kappl	TV series episode
2007	Tatort – Der Tote vom Strassenrand	Kriminalhauptkommissar Franz Kappl	TV series episode
2007	Mein alter Freund Fritz	Fritz Kessler	TV film
2008	Tatort – Das schwarze Grab	Kriminalhauptkommissar Franz Kappl	TV series episode
2009	Tatort – Bittere Trauben	Kriminalhauptkommissar Franz Kappl	TV series episode
2009	Schutzlos (Defenseless)	Jens	TV film
2010	Tatort – Hilflos	Kriminalhauptkommissar Franz Kappl	TV series episode
2010	Congo	Feldwebel Werner Malinck	TV film
2010	In aller Stille (Unspoken)	Anton Kirmayer	TV film
2010	Die Route (The Climb)	Mark Thaler	TV film
2011	Tatort – Heimatfront	Kriminalhauptkommissar Franz Kappl	TV series episode
2012	Tatort – Verschleppt	Kriminalhauptkommissar Franz Kappl	TV series episode
2013	Tatort – Aus der Tiefe der Zeit	Kriminalhauptkommissar Franz Kappl	TV series episode
2013	Die Chefin – Wahrheiten	Markus Jensch	TV series episode
2014	Clara Immerwahr	Fritz Haber	TV film
2014	München Mord – Die Hölle bin ich	Janosch Amsel	TV series episode
2014	Reiff für die Insel	Jonas Mikkelsen	TV series, 1 episode
2015	Die Insassen	Keith Winter	TV film
2015	Schwarzach 23	Franz Germinger junior	TV film
2015	Inas neues Leben	Sven Selig	TV film
2015	Kommissarin Lucas	Förster Henning Niemeyer	TV series, 1 episode
2015	Anatomy of Evil	Michael Auer	TV series, 1 episode
2015–2018	Tannbach (or Line of Separation)	Gustl Schober	TV series, 6 episodes, also includes Florian Brückner as Heinrich Schober
2016	Schwarzach 23 und die Jagd nach dem Mordsfinger	Franz Germinger junior	TV series episode
2016	Pregau (or Mörderisches Tal – Pregau)	Hannes Bucher	TV miniseries, 4 episodes
2017	Reformation	Martin Luther	TV miniseries, 2 episodes
2017	Hindafing	Alfons Zischl	TV series, all 6 episodes
2018	The Assassination	Andreas Kawert	TV miniseries, 2 episodes
2018	Schwarzach 23 und Der Schädel des Saatans	Franz Germinger Jr.	TV series episode
2018–2019	Arctic Circle	Thomas Lorenz	TV series, all 10 episodes

== Awards ==
- 2005 – Merkur-Theaterpreis (Merkur-theatre-prize, voted by readers of Münchner Merkur) for his portrayal of Boandl Kramer in The Brandner Kaspar and eternal life
- 2005 – Star of the Year of the Munich Abendzeitung for his portrayal of the Boandl Kramer in The Brandner Kaspar and eternal life
- 2005 – (Austrian) Undine Award – nomination best film debutant
- 2006 – German Critics Award
- 2006 – Romy (TV award) – nomination for Best Male Shooting Star
- 2006 – Nomination for the Adolf Grimme Award for his performance in the films Papa und Mama and Tatort: Tod auf der Walz
- 2006 – Bavarian Art Prize – Department of Performing Arts
- 2007 – European Shooting Star 2007 from Germany of the European Film Promotion (EFP) as part of the Berlinale
- 2007 – Cultural Award of the district of Rosenheim
- 2018 – Bavarian Television Award – Best Actor in the category TV Movie / Series and Series for his role in Hindafing (BR)
