= Saralisa Volm =

German actress (born 1985)

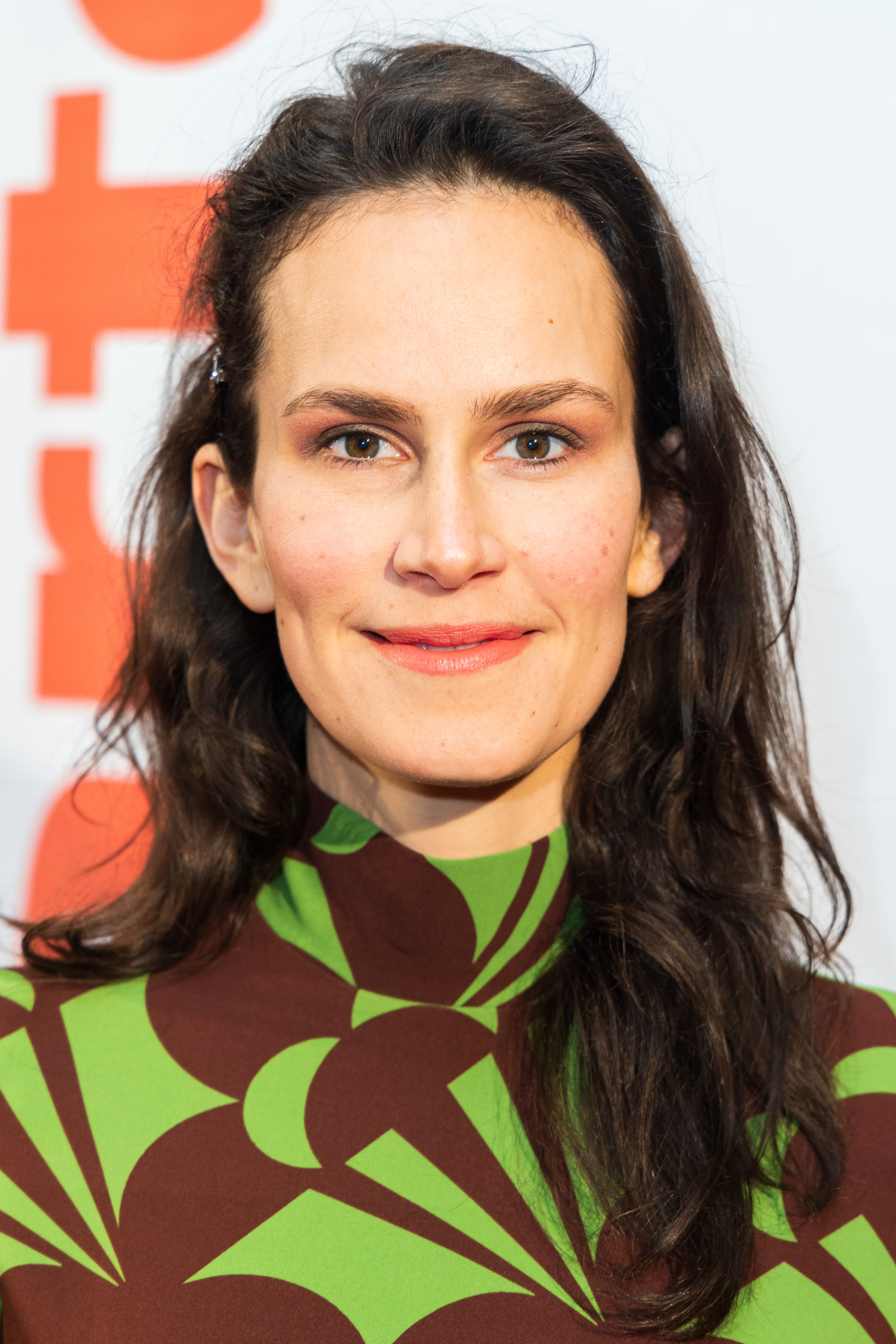
Volm in 2023

Saralisa Volm (born 24 June 1985 in Hechingen, West Germany) is a German actress, famous, among other things for her starring role in Finale, a film by Klaus Lemke. Volm grew up in Freising, where she also went to high school. Part of her schooling was at the Gabriel-von-Seidl-Gymnasium Bad Tölz.

In 2011 Volm was also featured fully nude in graphic unsimulated sex scenes in the crowd funded German film Hotel Desire.

== Filmography ==
as actress

- 2007: Finale (TV movie)
- 2008: Dancing with Devils (TV movie)
- 2009: Dawn (short)
- 2010: Schmutziger Süden (TV movie)
- 2011: Hotel Desire (short)
- 2011: SOKO 5113: Bis(s) in alle Ewigkeit (TV series episode)
- 2012: Das ist ja das Leben selbst!
- 2012: Berlin für Helden
- 2013: Art Girls
- 2015: Die Verwandlung
- 2015: Time to Say Goodbye
- 2016: Shakespeares letzte Runde
- 2017: Mordkommission Istanbul: Ein Dorf unter Verdacht (TV series episode)
- 2017: Figaros Wölfe
- 2017: Fikkefuchs
- 2021: Enfant Terrible
- 2021: Als Susan Sontag im Publikum saß

as producer

- 2015: Die Verwandlung
- 2016: Instrumental Music Musikvideo der Band Leather Report
- 2017: Fikkefuchs
- 2018: Am Draht der Zeit (Kurzfilm)
- 2021: Alone Together (Kunstfilm)
- 2021: Ilse (Kurzfilm)
- 2021: The Silent Forest (Schweigend steht der Wald)

as director

- 2016: Instrumental Music Musikvideo der Band Leather Report
- 2018: Am Draht der Zeit (Kurzfilm)
- 2022: The Silent Forest (Schweigend steht der Wald)

as writer

- 2018: Am Draht der Zeit (Kurzfilm)
- 2021: Als Susan Sontag im Publikum saß

== Awards ==
- 2009 Norddeutscher Filmpreis als bester Fernsehfilm für Dancing with Devils
- 2015 First Steps Award - Nominierung für Die Verwandlung
- 2017 Filmfest München - Nominierung für den Förderpreis Neues Deutsches Kino für Fikkefuchs
- 2017 Deutscher Filmpreis - Vorauswahl für Fikkefuchs
- 2018 Kurzfilmwettbewerb Bayern 2030 – 3. Preis für Am Draht der Zeit
- 2021 Hatun Sürüci Preis für bitch MATERial Ausstellungsreihe ( Hatun-Sürücü-Preis 2021 | Grüne Fraktion Berlin (gruene-fraktion.berlin) )
