= L-MAG =

German lesbian magazine

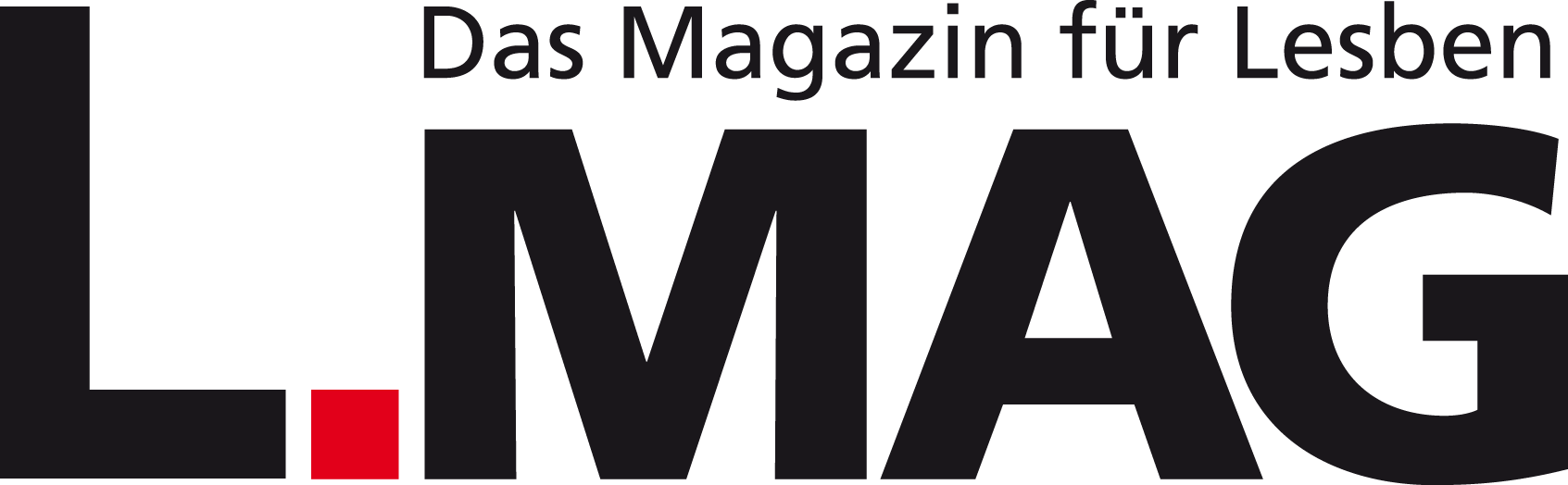

- November/December 2019 cover
- Editor-in-chief: Manuela Kay
- Frequency: bi-monthly
- Publisher: Special Media SDL
- First issue: Summer 2003
- Country: Germany
- Based in: Berlin
- Language: German
- Website: http://www.l-mag.de/

L-MAG is a magazine that is aimed at a lesbian target audience. The German print magazine for lesbians appears bi-monthly and is available in Germany, Austria, Switzerland and Luxemburg. Approximately 15.000 copies are printed with each edition. L-MAG is available at over 2.000 outlets (e.g. train station newsagents, selected bookstores and community L-spots) and can also be purchased on subscription and as an e-publication.

The magazine is published by Special Media SDL, which also publishes Berlin's biggest queer city magazine, Siegessäule. The co-founder and editor in chief since its inception is Manuela Kay.

== History ==
L-MAG originated as an idea of the now deceased publisher Reiner Jackwerth. In 2002, he asked the then-editor of the Siegessäule, Manuela Kay; "What do lesbians who live outside of Berlin actually read?" He then asked her, "Ms Kay, please think of something." For the 2003 Gay Pride season, the first 40 000 copies, with the title "What Lesbians Really Want", were distributed at Pride in Hamburg, Berlin, Cologne, Munich, Frankfurt am Main and Stuttgart. On reflection, Manuela Kay, editor in chief, said, "And then in the summer of 2003, we made the extraordinary journey over six consecutive weekends to six CSD Prides from Hamburg to Munich. It was tough appealing to the somewhat sceptical lesbians who were reluctant CSD participants, who didn't really trust that we knew our way: a magazine for lesbians? That seemed far too new and trivial." Prominent interviewees in the first edition included Ulrike Folkers, Katharina Franck, Tegan & Sara and porn star, Dolly Buster, in "Unexpected Interviews".

Initially, L-MAG magazine was published by Jackwerth Publishing as a free, quarterly A5 publication, in parallel with the then country-wide magazine Lespress, that unlike L-MAG, was not available in general newsagents and outlets. Furthermore, L-MAG was compiled by the Siegessäule team.

From January 2005, the L-MAG went on sale with a print run of 30 000 copies in pocket book format, with over 3 000 subscribers.

At the beginning of 2008, the L-MAG was the first of the German media to interview the President of the DFB (German Football Association), Theo Zwanziger, on the theme of homosexuality and professional football. Gudrun Fertig conducted the interview.

In 2009, there was a complete design relaunch, with a new logo, that is still in use.

After the liquidation of the Jackwerth publishing company, the result of the erstwhile publisher Reiner Jackwerth's retirement, the L-MAG was taken over in May 2012 by part of the media holdings, which were retained and absorbed into the newly established Special Media SDL. Manuela Kay, the editor in chief of L-MAG, as well as the editor in chief of the publishing company's online media, Gudrun Fertig took over as the co-directors of the newly founded publishing house.

== Print ==
L-MAG is the first magazine for lesbians that has appeared regularly in newsagents since the time of National Socialism. L-MAG regards itself as a journalistically driven magazine in the tradition of the lesbian magazines of the 1920s in Germany, like Die Freundin (The Female Friend/The Girlfriend) and Garçonne (Flapper). L-MAG is on a par with Curve in the USA and Diva in the United Kingdom.

L-MAG's focus in the printing field lies in the representation of the diverse lives of lesbian women and a self-evident and a self-confident handling of the theme of being a lesbian. In contrast to the practically invisible presence of lesbians in the mainstream media and society in general, L-MAG celebrates the visibility and participation of lesbian women in all aspects of life. In addition, L-MAG deliberately abstains from reporting on the clichéd themes so predominant in other women's magazines e.g. fashion and dieting. Instead, strong, successful lesbian women are portrayed and national and global lesbian culture is depicted.

The feelings of isolation and being more or less alone in the world, that are so familiar to many lesbians, are countered with multiple portraits, interviews, photos and news that portray the rich diversity and omnipresence of lesbians. The desire for positive role models, ideals and pioneers are reflected in L-MAG in the form of portraits and interviews and numerous photo sets.

Among others, L-MAG has interviewed and portrayed famous lesbian role models such as model and actor, Ruby Rose, rock star Melissa Etheridge, singer Kd lang, front woman of the band Skunk Anansie Skin, the performers and makers of the series The L Word, both actors who portrayed the character Lisbeth Salander i.e. Rooney Mara and Noomi Rapace, footballers e.g. Nadine Angerer, Nilla Fischer or Ramona Bachmann, TV presenters Bettina Böttinger and Dunja Hayali, feminist Laurie Penny, supermodel Jenny Shimizu, pop star Beth Ditto, actors Ulrike Folkerts and Maren Kroymann, diverse politicians or unexpected interviewees such as Dolly Buster, Wolfgang Petry or "Bond Girl" Lea Seydoux.

Regular columns in the magazine include international reporting about lesbians in all walks of life: politics, sex, gossip, horoscopes, music, sport, film, books. In addition, every publication deals with a focal theme e.g. family, social media, freedom, friendship, romance, Europe, art, bisexuality.

== Online ==
From its inception, L-MAG commanded an extensive online presence with news and additional lesbian-focused services e.g. 'L-Dating', 'L-Events' and the permanent column 'K-Word' with lesbian gossip. In September 2009, the new L-MAG website with a lesbian online portal went live. Since June 2016, the website also offers a mobile version and currently enjoys over 120 000 page impressions per month. (122 164 November 2015, according to the IVW, the German Audit Bureau of Circulation).

== Actions and campaigns ==
- To mark its release in 2005, the campaign relating to the cover "Lesbians Kiss Better" was launched. This marked the start of lesbian visibility and set the bar high in the term so all things lesbian.
- Since January/February 2005, the "L-Campaign" has appeared in the publication with the slogan "L as in Out Lesbian". The campaign appears in every edition and consists of a photo of a well-known celebrity making an L-shape using thumb and forefinger, in which out-lesbian self-confidence and solidarity is celebrated. The first featured the actor, Maren Kroymann, with her erstwhile partner, Claudia Miller. Since then other greats have been featured, such as musicians Melissa Etheridge, Beth Ditto, Heather Pearce, Peaches, Amanda Palmer, philosopher Judith Butler, the bands Betty, Rosenstolz, comedians Georg Uecker and Olivia Jones, Dirk Bach, actor Jasmin Tabatabai i and Romy Haag, TV presenter Bettina Böttinge 1] and footballer Nilla Fisch 32] – all posing for lesbian visibility. Within the LGBT Community, the gesture remains an established and well-loved symbol.
- In May/June 2005, L-MAG campaigned for the successful TV series, The L-Word, already broadcast in 17 other countries, to become available on German television. Six L-MAG colleagues agreed to have the strapline "L-MAG wants the L-Word" projected onto their naked bodies, in imitation of the billboard motif advertising the series. Postcards adorned with this motif were widely distributed and the readers entreated to sign them and post them, as a challenge to Pro7's editorial office. In total, 2.000 postcards with this motif and emails were handed over to Pro7 in Munich. At the same time, the broadcaster announced that they had purchased the rights to broadcast the L-Word. From 30 May 2006, the series was broadcast on Pro7.
- In 2008, at the start of the Gay Pride season, L-MAG unveiled the campaign, "Germany is becoming lesbian". The sticker bearing this slogan was distributed at virtually every pride event. Readers were invited to take photos of themselves wearing the stickers and making the 'L' gesture with their fingers (like the "L Campaign").
- In 2012–2013, L-MAG collected donations towards the Ugandan Lesbian Organisation, FARUG (Freedom and Roam Uganda). From November 2012, a charity T-shirt, designed by the German eco-label Cantana, went on sale, bearing the slogan "Marching for those who can't". The motif on the t-shirt comprised the outline of a woman, making the L shape with her fingers. Of the €15 sale price, €5 went to FARUG. In addition, a further €600 lump sum of donations was collected on behalf of the Serbian Lesbian Organisation, Labris.
- In April 2016, L-MAG joined its sister magazine, the SIEGESSÄULE, (Berlin's queer city guide, also owned by the Special Media SDL publisher) in the Berlin initiative, "Berlin needs us! No Votes for the Blue and Browns!" (This prominent media campaign was aiming to weaken support for local and regional right-wing parties). Members of the Berlin Aids Relief (Berlin Aidshilfe, BAH) initiated the campaign, which was a federation of queer initiatives, media, institutions and self-help groups. Under the motto, "Get your head out of your arse and vote!", the queer vote was sought to actively undermine the popularity of right- and far-right-wing parties, the AfD (Alternative für Deutschland) and the NPD (Nationale Partei Deutschlands).

== Events ==
- From 2007 to 2012, L-MAG, in conjunction with the gay-lesbian film distributor Edition Salzgeber and the cinema chain CinemaxX, organised a monthly screening of lesbian films in CinemaxX cinemas. The popular event, entitled "L-Film Night", was initiated in five cities, before expanding to a total of 20.
- In March 2015, L-MAG and SIEGESSÄULE jointly organised a club night at the well-known Berlin gay club, Schwuz. The podium discussion was entitled, "The Invisible Lesbian – on the Disappearance of an Identity" and was followed by the party "Precious Pearls", as well as the "Diesel Dyke Lounge" event. In September 2016, a follow-up event "Dyke* Out – good news for bad grrrlz" was organised at the same venue, with a podium discussion entitled, "Good Lesbian, Evil Lesbian".

== Awards ==
In 2010, the lead article "European Paradise?" of the May/June 2009 edition, about the European elections, was awarded the European Parliament's Prize for Journalism, in the category 'Print'.

== Social engagement ==
To mark its 10th anniversary in 2013, L-MAG initiated and organised the Dyke* March Berlin. Marching under the motto "Lesbian Visibility and Lust for Life", on the eve of the Pride March, a bevy of lesbians took to the streets of Berlin. By doing so, L-MAG sparked a new movement for lesbian visibility in Germany. Cologne (2015) and Hamburg (2016) soon followed suit with their own Dyke Marches.

== Miscellaneous ==
An early edition of L-MAG, entitled "Counter-public/Underground" was printed to accompany the exhibition "Homosexualities*" (2015) in the DHM (Deutschen Historischen Museum), the German History Museum in Berlin.
