= Trimmel =

Trimmel is a surname. Notable people with this surname include:

- Christopher Trimmel (born 1987), Austrian football player
- Clemens Trimmel (born 1978), Austrian tennis player
- Nicole Trimmel (born 1982), Austrian kickboxer

== Fictional characters ==
- Paul Trimmel, character in Tatort
