= Friederike Kempter =

German actress (born 1979)

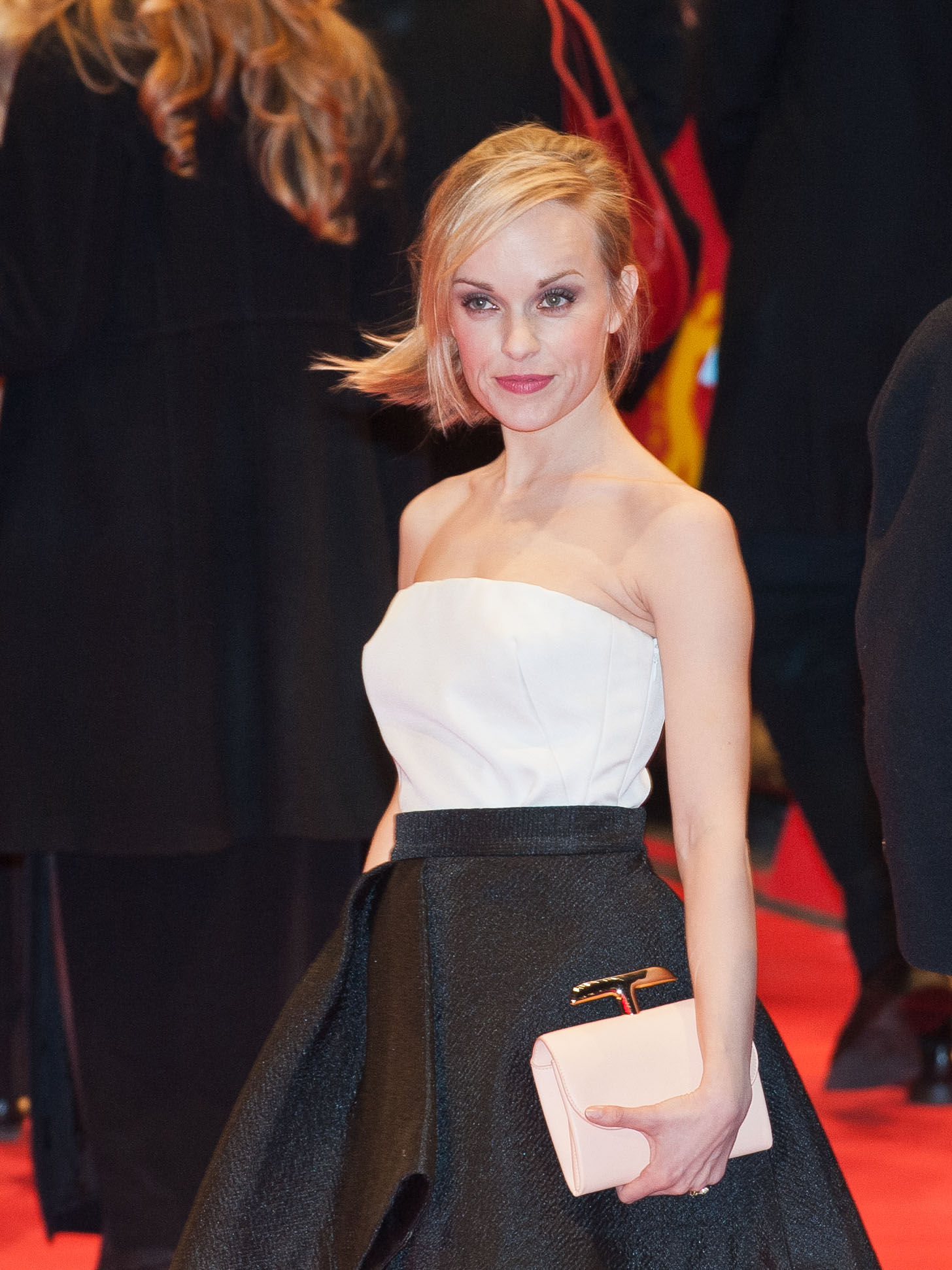
- Kempter, at the opening of the 64th Berlin International Film Festival
- Born: 23 August 1979 (age 47)
- Occupation: Actress

Friederike Kempter (born 23 August 1979) is a German actress. Her acting credits include films like Pandorum and A Coffee in Berlin as well as television shows like Ladykracher and Hauptstadtrevier. She has played Police Kommissar Nadeshda Krusenstern in the Thiel and Boerne Tatort episodes since 2002. In 2025, she performed as a narrator for the performance of The Carnival of the Animals by Saint-Saëns with hr-Sinfonieorchester.

== Filmography (selection) ==
- Moianacht (2000)
- Tatort (TV series, since 2002)
- Eight Miles High (2007)
- Vollidiot (2007)
- Ladykracher (TV series, 2008–2012)
- Pandorum (2009)
- Kokowääh (2011)
- What a Man (2011)
- Men Do What They Can (2012)
- A Coffee in Berlin (2012)
- Heiter bis tödlich: Hauptstadtrevier (TV series, since 2012)
- SMS für Dich (2016)
- Goodbye Berlin (2016)

== Audiobooks ==
- 2016: Charlotte Link, Die Entscheidung, Random House Audio, ISBN 978-3-8371-3628-9
