= Siegessäule (magazine) =

German queer monthly

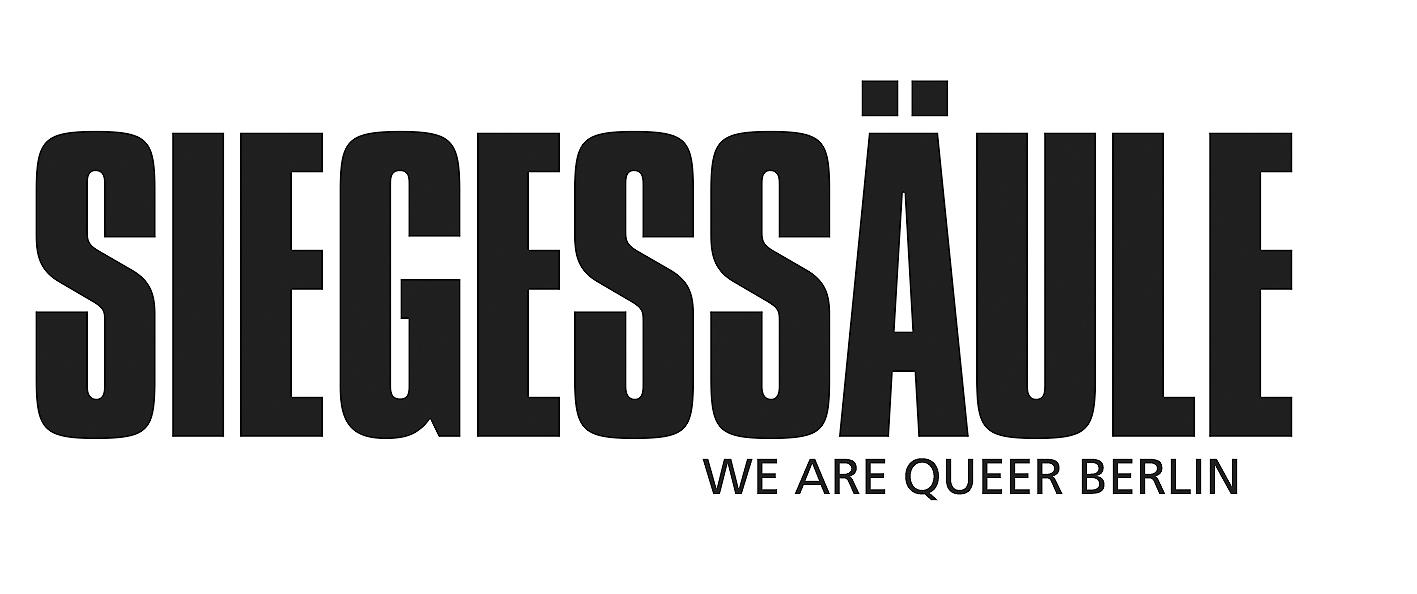

- Cover of the October 2010 edition
- Editors-in-chief: Jan Noll
- Frequency: Monthly
- Circulation: 53,688 (2016)
- Founded: 1984
- Company: Special Media SDL
- Country: Germany
- Based in: Berlin
- Language: German, English
- Website: siegessaeule.de

Siegessäule is Berlin's most widely distributed queer magazine and has been published monthly, except for two brief hiatuses, since April 1984. Originally only available in West Berlin, it ran with the subtitle "Berlin's monthly page for Gays". In 1996, it was broadened to include lesbian content, and in 2005 it was expanded to reach a wider queer target base, becoming the only magazine of its scale in Europe to represent the full spectrum of the LGBT community. The magazine is available for free at around 700 locations in Berlin, printing 53.688 copies per month (verified third quarter 2016). Since March-issue 2013, it has been overseen by chief editor Jan Noll.

== History ==
On February 29, 1984, the idea for a gay city magazine came up on the protocol of a meeting of gay groups in Berlin at the Prinz Eisenherz bookstore on Bülowstraße, and the magazine's first official meeting took place at the gay nightclub SchwuZ on Kulmer Straße. The first edition was published by "Freunde der Siegessäule e.V.", released in April in a run of 1,000 copies, containing 16 pages, for the price of one Deutsche Mark. The name was not easily agreed upon, with Siegessäule finally chosen in reference to the Berliner memorial, the Victory Column.

Siegessäule was one of the earliest German publications to report regularly on AIDS and HIV. In December 1985, it printed a groundbreaking special edition under the title "AIDS – The Dimension of a Disease" in which the current state of research and socio-political debates were summarized – by gay men, for gay men. With contributions by Rosa von Praunheim, Matthias Frings, Peter Hedenström, Elmar Kraushaar and Karl-Heinz Albers – the booklet was available for free, funded by a grant from the Berliner CDU's senator of health, Ulf Fink.

After the September 1989 issue (then costing 4 Deutsche Marks), the magazine discontinued until November 1990 when the nationwide gay publication magnus issued it as a supplement to their magazine. Aside from that, Siegessäule was distributed as a stand-alone publication for free amongst the city's scene. At this point, it contained eight pages and listed 216 gay-related events. Within a few months, editors Micha Schulze and Dirk Evenson expanded the editorial cultural and event content to also include community and political topics, tripling the number of pages to 24.

When the publishing house went bankrupt in 1995, magnus and with it Siegessäule were acquired by publisher and journalist Reiner Jackwerth. In 1996, magnus was permanently discontinued. Siegessäule was reborn as an independent city magazine, and has remained available for free since then, funded by advertising. The new chief editors, Manuela Kay (starting in 1996) and Peter Polzer (1997), officially turned the previously "gay" publication into a "gay/lesbian" one with 80 pages in a circulation of 40,000 copies. Over the course of the 90s, Siegessäule became a more serious journalistic medium and the mouthpiece of the city's gay and lesbian scene.

In 2005, Holger Wicht took over as the chief editor, relaunching the magazine's tagline of "gay/lesbian" with "queer", manifesting its intent to represent a wider spectrum of the LGBT community in its content. Sirko Salka took over as chief editor in 2008, continuing this increasingly inclusive direction. Upon its 25th anniversary in March 2009, then-mayor Klaus Wowereit declared Siegessäule the "journalistic flagship of Berlin's gay-lesbian community".

In 2012, Special Media SDL, the publishing firm newly founded by Gudrun Fertig and Manuela Kay, took over the magazine. That autumn, Siegessäule began running its calendar of events bilingually, in German and English. The duo of Jan Noll and Christian Reinthal stepped up as chief editors for the March 2013 issue, and increased the amount of English content starting with the relaunch of the magazine in October 2014, celebrating its 30th anniversary. Now with the tagline "We are queer Berlin", Siegessäule is Berlin's queer, German-English city magazine averaging around 100 pages per issue, and the most widely distributed periodical of its kind in the world.

Jan Noll has been the sole chief editor as of the May 2017 issue.

== Print ==
Siegessäule reports monthly on queer-relevant topics including politics, community, film, music, literature and theater. With around 1,500 events listed each month, Siegessäule has one of the most extensive regional calendars within Germany's queer media landscape. Other free printed items bearing the magazine's brand, including Kompass, the gay-lesbian business directory for Berlin. Siegessäule has also published special editions for Berlin Pride, the Teddy Award queer film prize, World AIDS Day and the BLF leather/fetish convention. In November 2015, Siegessäule took on the responsibility of printing the magazine for the annual "Kunstler gegen Aids" ("Artists Against AIDS") gala benefiting the community's AIDS support organization.

== Online ==
Siegessäule has had an online presence since January 1997. In 2008 Gudrun Fertig turned the website into a comprehensive resource with its own editorial department, a constantly updated event calendar and a detailed directory of city locations. With its 2013 relaunch came a bilingual event calendar (German and English) and a mobile version. Currently, the Siegessäule editorial team is responsible for website's content with daily updates.

== Logo ==
The magazine's logo has changed several times over the years. The current logo has been used since the October 2014 relaunch. Celebrating the magazine's 30-year history, it uses a bolder variant of the font from the original 1984 logo (which was originally in italics).

== Campaigns ==
In its May 2006 issue, Siegessäule urged its readers to join the Warsaw Equality Parade to show solidarity with LGBT people in Poland with its difficult political situation.

On various occasions, such as Lesbian-Gay City Festival and in 2016 at the monthly Siegessäule lounge night, the magazine collected donations for queer NGOs and projects such as Queer Amnesty, Schwulenberatung, LesMigraS, MILES and Women in Exile.

In April 2016, Siegessäule joined L-MAG (its nationwide sister publication under Special Media SDL) in a Berliner initiative gathering queer media to take a stand against rising right-wing political parties.

== Awards ==
From 1993 through 2015, Siegessäule awarded the Else, a prize that offered up to 1,000 euros to the winning film, chosen by readers of the magazine and a jury. The Else was an official award of the Berlinale (Berlin International Film Festival).

At Siegessäule's annual drag contest, which took place every Easter 2009–2014 at the queer nightclub SchwuZ, the prize for best drag performer was awarded.

== Events ==
Aside from various big parties in the 1990s and early 2000s, Siegessäule hosted several Panel discussions and events related to the topic such as lesbian visibility, discrimination within the community and Hepatitis C.

From 2010 to 2013, Siegessäule and SchwuZ organized the Queer Noises Festival, a platform to showcase bands and artists from the local queer scene and beyond.

For the magazine's 30th anniversary, Siegessäule and the Gay Museum created the exhibition "30 Years of Siegessäule", in which all issues from publication's back catalog, along with other visual material from its archives, were on display and available to read.

== Controversy ==
In November 2003, Siegessäule had a cover story about the coming-out of young gays and lesbians in Berlin's Turkish-Muslim community. The cover depicted a Turkish flag accompanied by the headline "Türken raus!" ("Turks out!") – a play on words with the emancipatory process of coming "out of the closet", but also provocatively reminiscent of a call for them to "get out" of the country. This caused backlash from the queer and Turkish communities.

In its May 2006 issue, when Siegessäule urged its readers to join the Warsaw Equality Parade in solidarity with LGBT Poles, it depicted the Polish cartoon characters Bolek and Lolek as homosexual activists. The cover image attracted great attention in Poland and was opposed by Polish organizations, citizens and the copyright holders.

In the schism of Berlin Pride in 2014, which led to three different demonstrations/parades, Siegessäule published a satirical piece titled "Which Pride type are you? Siegessäule helps you choose the right demo". It prompted strong negative reactions in parts of the Berlin community.
