= 666 – Traue keinem, mit dem du schläfst! =

2002 film

- German theatrical release poster
- Directed by: Rainer Matsutani
- Written by: Rainer Matsutani
- Produced by: Bernd Eichinger
- Starring: Jan Josef Liefers; Armin Rohde
- Cinematography: Hans-Günther Bücking
- Edited by: Hanna Müller
- Music by: Henning Lohner
- Production companies: Constantin Film; Engram Pictures
- Distributed by: Constantin Film
- Release date: 21 February 2002
- Running time: 95 minutes
- Country: Germany
- Language: German

666 – Traue keinem, mit dem du schläfst! (English: 666: In Bed with the Devil) is a 2002 German film directed by Rainer Matsutani. It is very loosely based on a few elements from the 1808 play Faust by Johann Wolfgang von Goethe.

== Cast ==
- Jan Josef Liefers: Frank Faust
- Armin Rohde as Mephisto
- Sonsee Neu as Jennifer
- Hanns Zischler as The Devil
- Thure Riefenstein: Axel
- Mariella Ahrens as Conny

... and as fictional versions of themself:

- Ralf Bauer
- Boris Becker
- Iris Berben
- Bernd Eichinger
- Verona Feldbusch
- Heiner Lauterbach
- Henry Maske
- Rudolph Moshammer
- Claudia Schiffer
- Hella von Sinnen
