= Manuela Kay =

German journalist, author and publisher (born 1964)

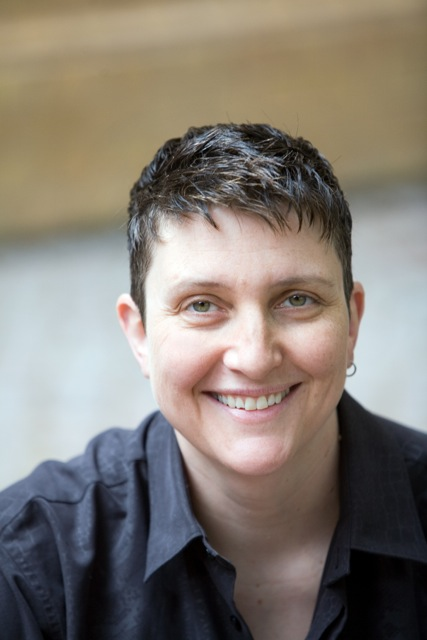
- Kay in 2013
- Born: 1964; West Berlin, West Germany
- Occupations: Journalist, author and publisher

Manuela Kay (born 2 April 1964) is a German journalist, author and publisher.

== Life and career ==
Kay worked from the first day of its founding (March 1987) until February 1991 as the editor and presenter of the first Berlin private Radio Station, Radio 100, including the gay-lesbian show ‘Eldoradio’. She is co-author and film producer of numerous video films on the theme of lesbian sexuality and feminist pornography.

In 1992 and 1994, she released the films ‘Du Darfst’ (engl. title “Truth or Dare“) and ‘Airport’. The 33-minute, low budget film ‘Airport’ is regarded as the first German lesbian porno and remains to this day a milestone in the history of pornography.

After working as a freelance journalist, author and presenter, she worked from 1996 until 2005 as the editor-in-chief of Berlin's queer city magazine, Siegessäule published then by Jackwerth publishing company. Kay played a decisive role in the redevelopment of the magazine from a gay male publication to a gay-lesbian and ultimately queer inclusive content. In 2003, she planned and conceived the lesbian magazine, the L-MAG and was co-editor in-chief with Peter Polzer at its inception.

From 1995 to 2005, she worked at Berlin's International Film Festival in the Panorama section and the queer film prize, the Teddy Award. She is renowned within European (e.g. Kyiv, Turin, Bilbao, Barcelona, Bern, Lisbon, Prague) and international Film Festivals as a jury member and speaker.

Kay co-curated the exhibition ‘Nobody is Perfect – Lesbian and Gay Film Idols’ with Wolfgang Theis and Maria Schmidt (20 January – 11 April 1999) in Berlin's Schwules* Museum (Gay* Museum) and conducted numerous guided tours throughout the duration of the exhibition.

Since 2007, she has been working as the curator and a team member of the organising committee of the Pornfilmfestival Berlin.

In 2012, the Jackwerth publishing company was dissolved and sold. Manuela Kay and her colleague of many years, Gudrun Fertig, founded the Special Media SDL GmbH publishing house and took over the Siegessäule and L-MAG and DU&ICH in 2012. Kay and Fertig become directors and majority shareholders of the above-mentioned publications.

Kay's journalistic focus lies in the realm of lesbian culture, sexuality, film and international issues.

== Socio-political commitments ==
Manuela Kay identifies as a radical feminist and is committed to lesbian visibility, Feminism and LGBT Rights in general.

For the tenth anniversary of L-MAG in 2013, Kay realised a lifelong dream and initiated Berlin's inaugural Dyke* March, based on the USA's model. Since then, other German cities have followed suit: Cologne (2015), Hamburg (2016) and the Dyke* March in Heidelberg in 2017, with a demonstration for Lesbian Visibility, which took place the night before the Pride March.

== Awards ==
In 2013, Kay was the recipient of the IGLTA (International Gay Lesbian Travel Association) Travel Writer Award.

In 2015, Manuela Kay and Gudrun Fertig were awarded the Augsburg-Heymann Prize. Since 2009, this annual award honours work by courageous lesbians LAG Lesbians in NRW (a network of lesbian groups in the German state of Nordrhein-Westfalen) towards the Advancement and Visibility of Lesbian Women.

== Publications ==
=== Films ===
- Du Darfst (You May) (1992)
- Latex Hearts (1993)
- Airport (1994)
- Co-Producer and Co-Director of Short Film Collection Fucking Different XXX (2011)

=== Books ===
- Come Better. The Sex Book for Lesbians. (Schöner Kommen: Das Sexbuch für Lesben). Berlin: Querverlag. 5th Edition. 2000. ISBN 978-3-89656-047-6
- I Take this Love for Myself: Lesbian Guidebook. (Diese Liebe Nehm' Ich Mir: Der Lesben-Ratgeber). Reinbek bei Hamburg: Rowohlt, 2001. ISBN 3-499-61180-5
- (with Axel Schock) Out im Kino! – the Lesbian/Gay Film Dictionary (Out im Kino!: Das Lesbisch-Schwule Filmlexikon). Berlin: Querverlag, 2003. ISBN 3-89656-090-5
- Translation: The L-Word: Wilkommen in Unserer Welt. Berlin: Querverlag, 2006. ISBN 3-89656-131-6

=== Book articles ===
- Important Things to know about Berlin Lesbians. Micha Schulze (Ed.): Homopolis. Gay Berlin. Jackwerth Verlag Berlin and Cologne 1997. ISBN 3-932117-33-6
- Warm Beer and Cold Stares. In:Traude Bührmann (Ed.): Lesbian Berlin: City Guide. Orlanda Frauenverlag (Orlanda Women's Press). Berlin 2002. (1999). {{ISBN|978-3-929823-59-2}}
- On the Hunt – Every Woman for Herself. In Joachim Braun & Beate Martin: Mixed Feelings. A Lesbian Reader for Sexual Orientation. Roror/Rowohlt. Hamburg 2001. ISBN 978-3-499-60835-3
- The Unerotic Whiff of Unleaded Petrol. In Detlef Grumbach (Ed.): Over the Rainbow. A Christopher Street Day (CSD) Reader. Männerschwarm Press. Hamburg 2001. {{ISBN|978-3-928983-94-5}}
- The Police are Shit. In Lisa Kuppler (Ed.): Queer Crime: Lesbian/Gay Crime Histories. Querverlag. Berlin 2002. ISBN 978-3-89656-076-6
- Women from Neukölln Fuck Better. In Jörg Sundermeier/ Sarah Diel/ Werner Labisch (Eds) Neukölln Book. Verbrecher Press. Berlin 2003. {{ISBN|978-3-935843-28-7}}
- Tantalising Conversations about Excruciating Sex - SM. In Dennert, Leidinger, Rauchut (Eds): On the Move – 100 Years of Lesbian Politics, Culture and History. Querverlag. Berlin 2007. ISBN 978-3-89656-148-0
