= Special Media SDL =

German LGBTQ magazine

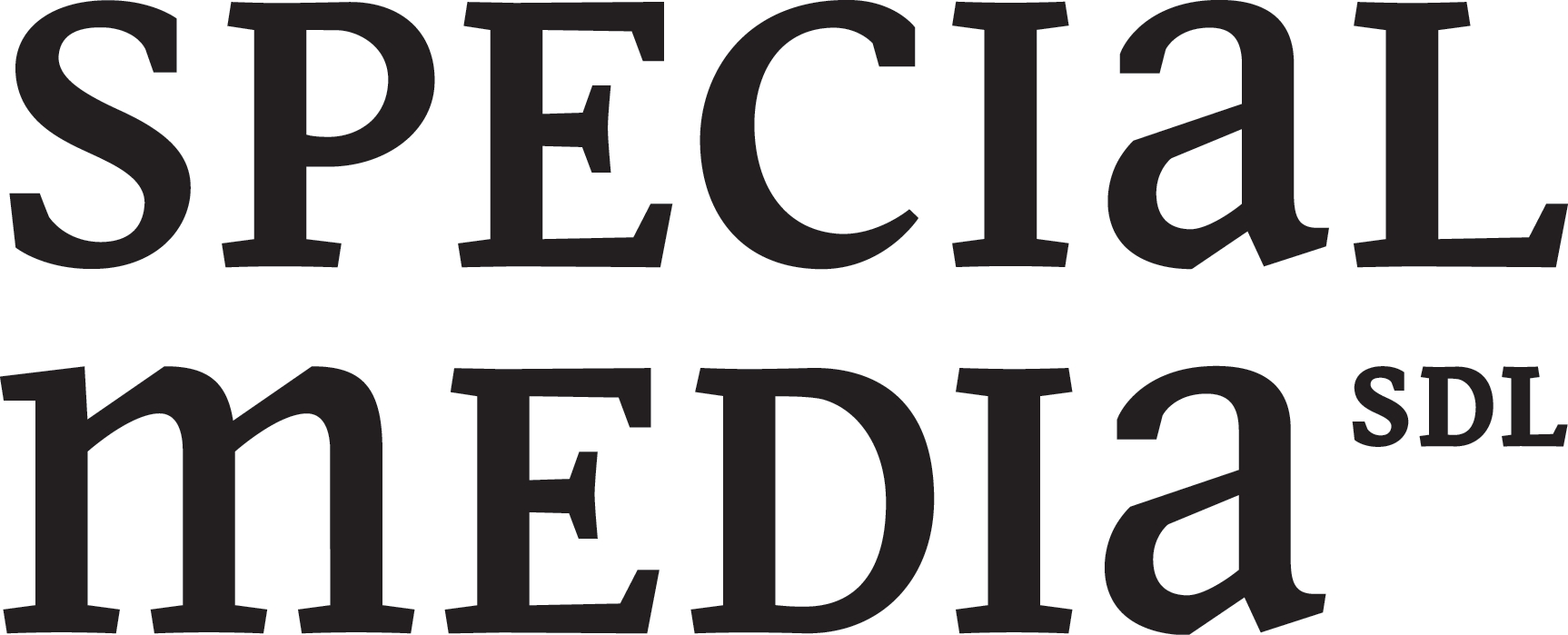
- Company type: Private Limited Company (GmbH)
- Founded: 1 May 2012 in Berlin, Germany
- Founder: Gudrun Fertig and Manuela Kay
- Headquarters: Berlin
- Website: www.specialmediasdl.info

Special Media SDL is a German LGBT Magazine and Online Media for the LGBT (Lesbian Gay Bi- and Trans*sexual) target audience. Special Media SDL's most well-known publication is the Berlin City Magazine, the Siegessäule, which has been in existence since 1984 and has the biggest print run for a city magazine in Berlin and the whole of Germany. It is published once a month and on average approx. 52 000 copies are distributed free from about 700 places in Berlin.

The publisher also produces the L-MAG, a magazine for lesbians, which was founded in 2003 and is available at book stores and newsagents throughout Germany, as well as in Austria, Switzerland and Luxembourg. The magazine is also available on subscription and as an E-paper publication.

Special Media SDL was established as a journalistic special interest publishing house in May 2012, by journalists Gudrun Fertig and Manuela Kay. They took over the new media wing of the Jackwerth Publishing Company, when the (now deceased) titular head, Reiner Jackwerth, took a professional backseat.

Both Fertig and Kay were employed for a long time as editors in chief in Jackwerth Publishing and are, inter alia, both company directors of Special Media SDL.

The Head Office is in Berlin-Kreuzberg.
