= Thiel and Boerne =

German television series characters

Detective chief inspector Frank Thiel and forensic medical examiner Dr. Karl Friedrich Boerne are the lead protagonists of the German television series, Tatort Münster, part of the German television crime series Tatort, which has been running continuously since 1970. The fictitious detectives are portrayed by actors Axel Prahl and Jan Josef Liefers, respectively. This humorous police procedural series has been airing since 2002 and is produced for the German television channel WDR. Two episodes are produced each year and on November 25, 2012, the tenth anniversary of the show was celebrated with the episode "Das Wunder von Wolbeck" (German for "The Wonder of Wolbeck").

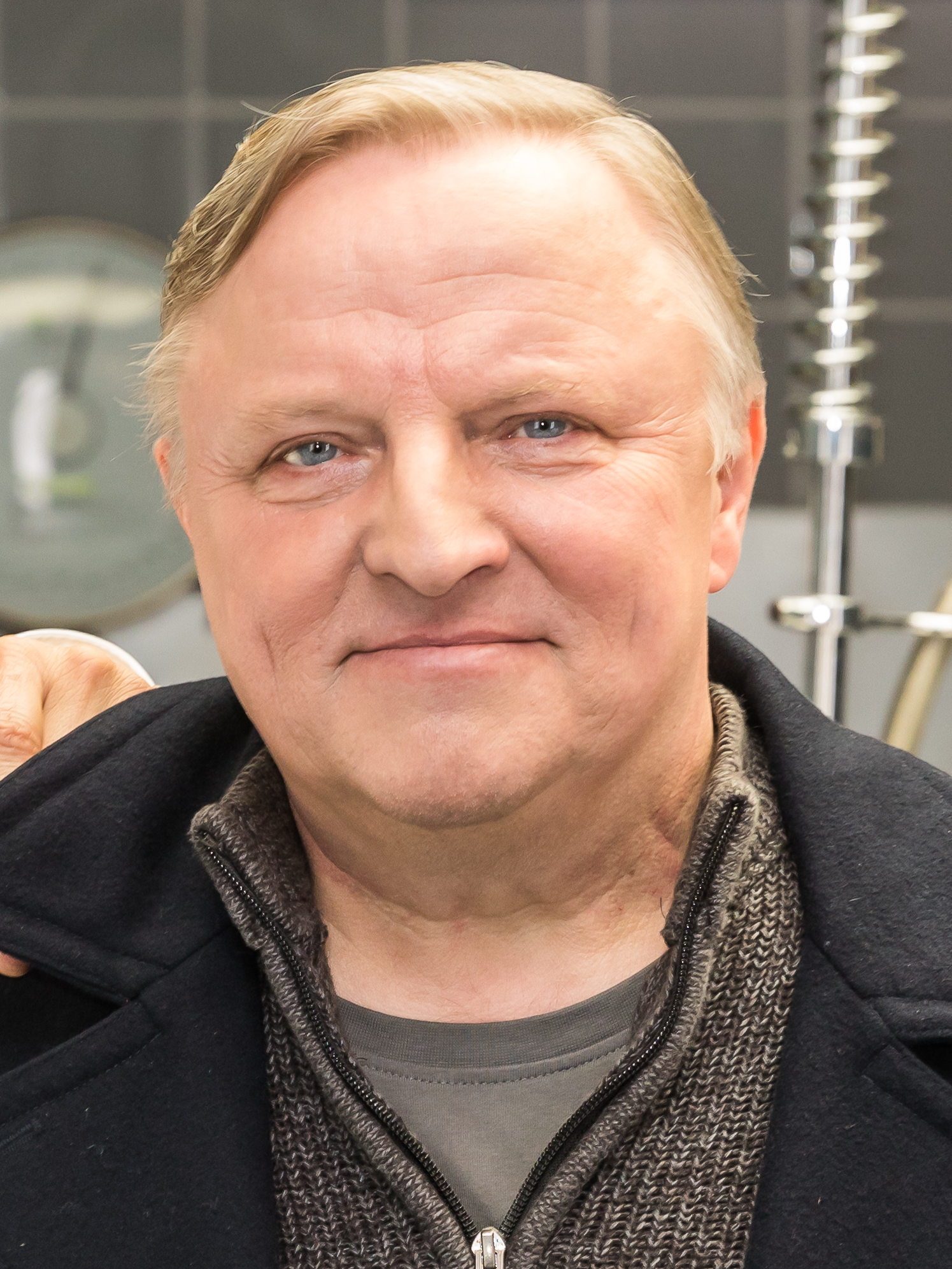
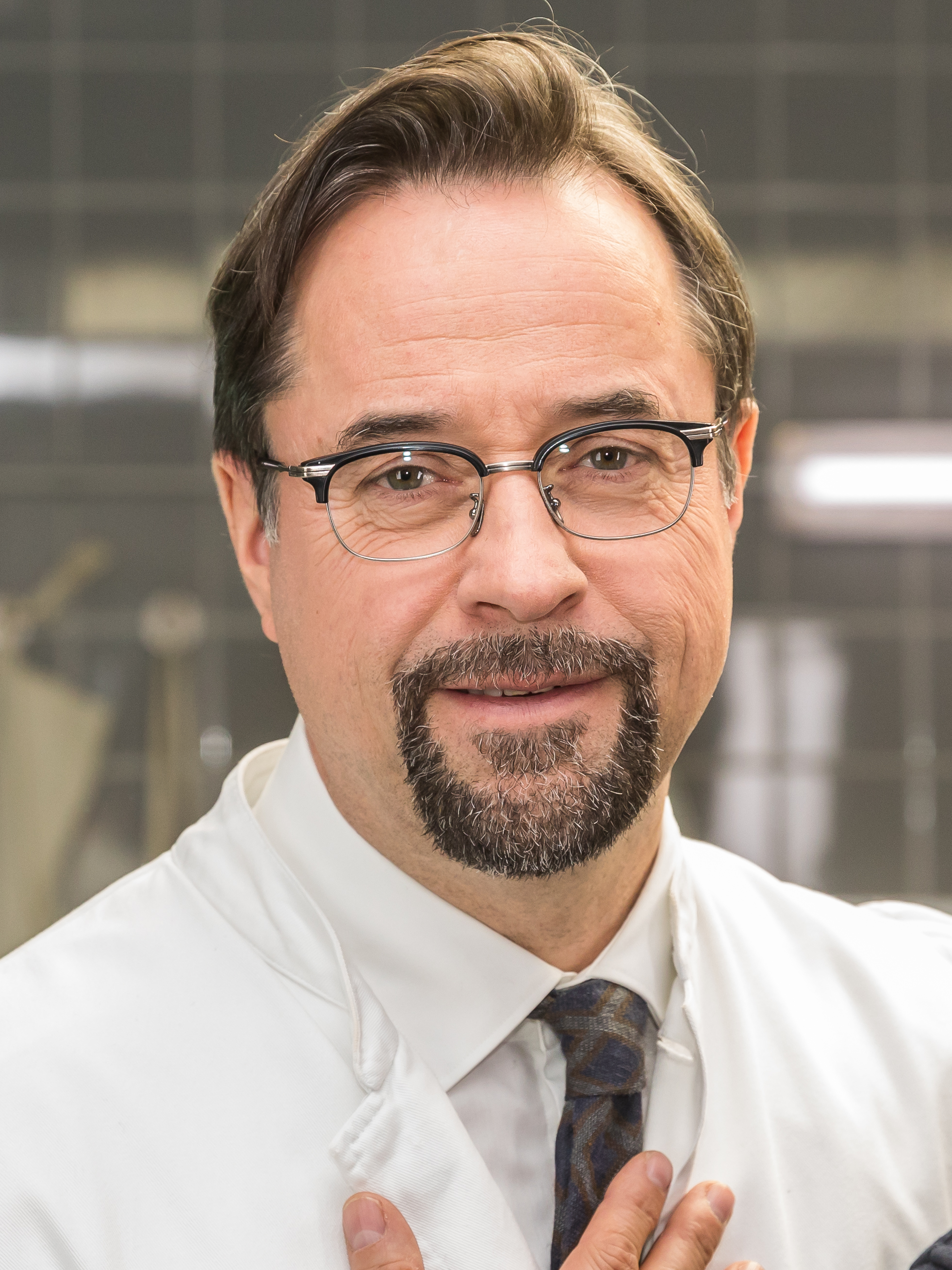
Axel Prahl (Thiel, left) and Jan Josef Liefers (Boerne, right)

== Production ==
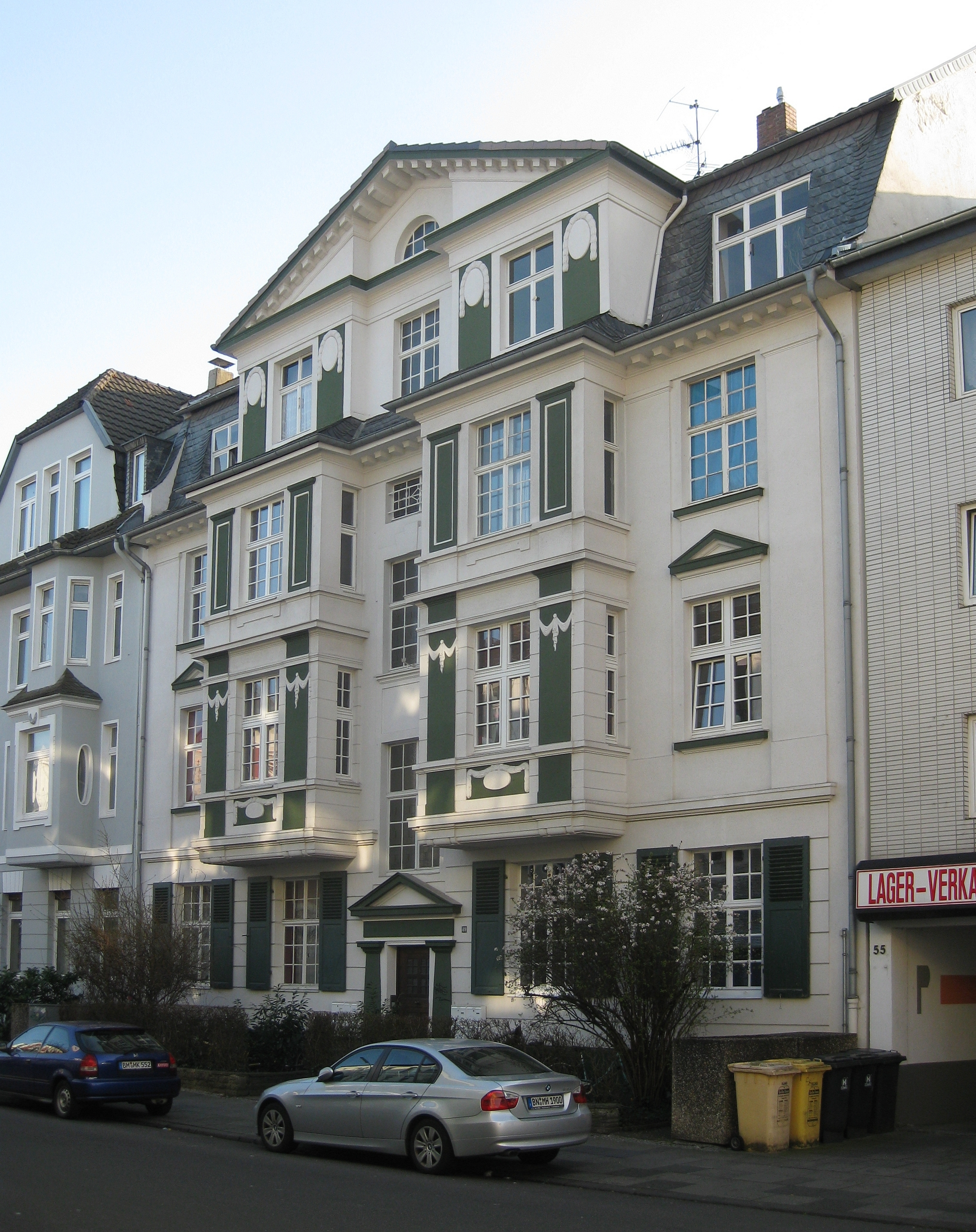
This house in Bonn was used as the setting for Thiel and Boerne's apartment building.

Tatort Münster was developed by screenwriters Stefan Cantz and Jan Hinter. The character of Professor Boerne was based on a renowned forensic examiner from the University of Münster. German actor Ulrich Noethen was initially offered the role, but he turned it down. Lead producers then offered the role to Jan Josef Liefers. According to Liefers, he had already observed 13 autopsies.

The production took place mostly in the area surrounding Cologne, where the WDR production companies Colonia Media and Filmpool are located. Only exterior shots were filmed in Münster on a regular basis. Production was sponsored by Filmservice Münster. Filmservice Münster is a project by the public relation office of the city of Münster, supported by "Münsterland e.V." association and the IHK "Nord-Westfalen" (industry of trade and commerce). A single episode of Tatort Münster is reported to have an approximate budget of 1.3 million euros.

The concept of a perpetual present is a typical narrative feature. Perpetual present means that individual episodes are not connected in a chronological way; instead, each episode is set in the immediate present under similar conditions to the previous episode. This results in the absence of character development. For example, the son of Detective Thiel is 12 years old in the first episode, "Der dunkle Fleck", in 2002 and six years later in "Wolfsstunde" he has aged only one year. Furthermore, the character of Nadeshda Krusenstern had to wait more than ten years to finally receive her detective's promotion, which is an unrealistically long period of time. Nevertheless, there is some procedural development. For example, Detective Thiel does not have a driver's license in the beginning of the series and has to rely on others to give him a ride, but several episodes later he can be seen driving himself.

== Characters ==
=== Frank Thiel ===
Detective Chief Inspector Frank Thiel, played by Axel Prahl, grew up in St. Pauli, a working-class district of Hamburg. He worked as a detective in Hamburg for several years before asking to be transferred to Münster. The reason for this decision was the declining health of his father who lives in Münster, and the fact that his wife moved to New Zealand with their son. Frank Thiel has been the chief of the homicide division in Münster ever since. Nevertheless, his heart is still strongly attached to his hometown, Hamburg. This is portrayed by his clothing style and various possessions that show his devotion to the football team FC St. Pauli. Thiel tends to be uncommunicative and his methods are rather unconventional but very meticulous. He rents an apartment in the building belonging to Medical Examiner Boerne. Together, they are a pair of opposites. While Boerne portrays the eloquent and stylish academic, Thiel represents the hardened and unsociable fast-food consumer, who can't seem to find a better use for his free time than to ardently follow his football team. Thiel's social inadequacies often provide an opportunity for ironic ridicule while conversing with Boerne.

=== Karl-Friedrich Boerne ===
Professor Dr. Dr. Karl-Friedrich Boerne, played by Jan Josef Liefers, comes from a very famous Westphalian family, many of his relatives being or having been reputable physicians. He is head of the Institute of Forensic Medicine of the Münster university hospital. As such, he works together with Thiel to solve crimes, their approach being rather unconventional. The collaboration is almost inevitable since Boerne generally interferes in the investigations even if he is not invited.

As a character, Boerne is the opposite of Thiel. He is arrogant, vigorous, and always has the final say. He doesn't admit to making any mistakes and considers himself a brilliant luminary. He holds skills outside his specialisation, speaking fluent Russian, which even impresses his colleague Nadeshda. This is an inside joke because Jan Josef Liefers comes from Dresden and acquired the language during his childhood. Since he is Thiel's landlord and both live in the same building, they sometimes cook together and talk about the current case. Boerne was married but his wife left him for her therapist, which is mentioned in the first episode, "Der Dunkle Fleck". He is a member of the Corps Pomerania-Westphalia zu Münster, a fictitious fraternity to which his father also once belonged.

The real model for the role of Karl-Friedrich Boerne was the professor Bernd Brinkmann, who was head of the Institute of Forensic Medicine in Münster from 1981 to 2007. Brinkmann had become famous due to many spectacular cross-border cases and testifying as an expert witness in the Kachelmann trial.

=== Silke Haller ===
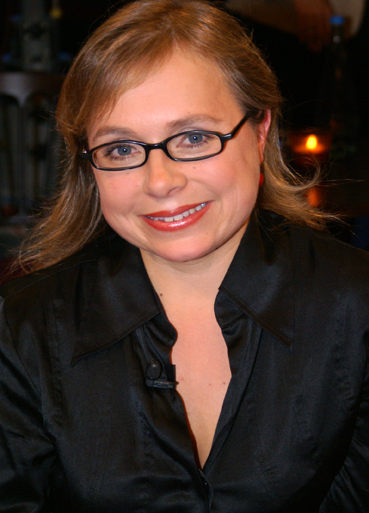
Christine Urspruch (Silke Haller)

Silke Haller, portrayed by actress Christine Urspruch, is the resolute deputy and closest colleague of Professor Boerne at the Institute of Forensic Medicine in Münster. She takes Boerne's allusions to her height in her stride. Haller is very short and Boerne nearly always calls her "Alberich", which refers to a dwarf in Wagner's Das Rheingold. She nevertheless does not feel degraded, particularly because she knows that this is Boerne's way of showing his appreciation, which is explained in the first episode. In the episode "Feierstunde", Boerne saves Haller's job by soliciting research funds.

=== Nadeshda Krusenstern ===
Nadeshda, played by Friederike Kempter, is Thiel's hard-working assistant. She emigrated from Russia and is a distant relative of the Russian explorer Adam Johann von Krusenstern. Her first name Nadeshda is a reference to the ship that von Krusenstern sailed around the world. She moved from Russia to Münster with her parents while she was still a child. Nadeshda chose a career within the police force; after a one-year internship with the drug squad, she transferred to the homicide squad, headed by Frank Thiel. Thiel likes to encourage his assistant and values her greatly. He likes to keep her on her toes by letting her take the lead in smaller investigations. She is promoted from a detective-in-training to detective in the episode "Erkläre Chimäre". In the improv episode "Das Team", Nadeshda falls victim to a serial killer.

=== Herbert Thiel ===
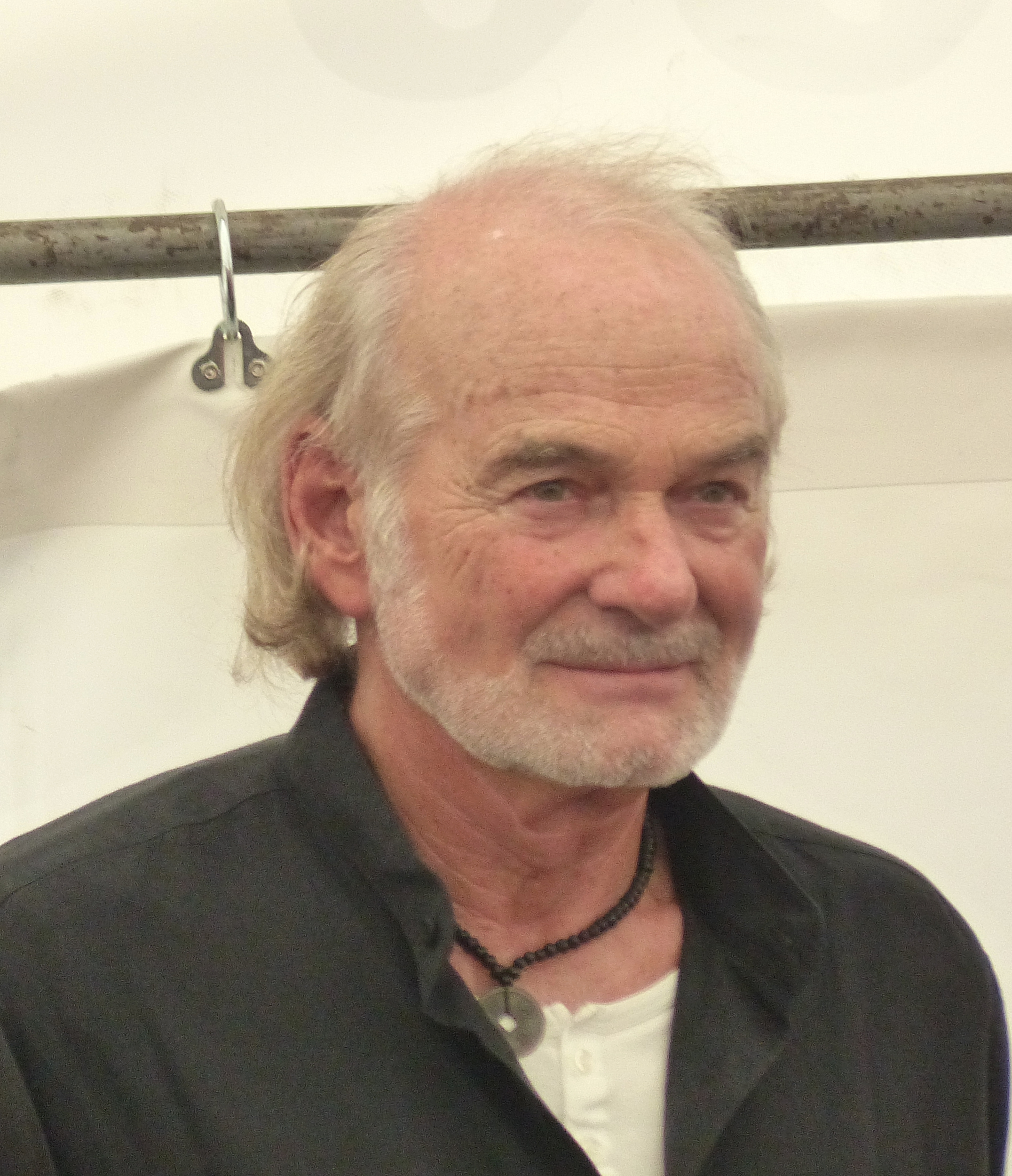
Claus Dieter Clausnitzer (Herbert Thiel)

Herbert Thiel is the father of Frank Thiel and the reason for Frank's move to Münster. Herbert was part of one of the revolutionary social movements in the late 1960s and never managed to shed his revolutionary mindset. He works as an independent taxi driver, which leaves him with enough money to pay for the constant repairs of his car. But beyond these repairs, he seems to suffer from a constant shortage of money. As a secondary income, he started growing marijuana. Aside from consuming it himself, he sells it to university students in Münster. It is often the case that whenever his son has to depend on Herbert's help, he is either high or his car breaks down. He often gets entwined in his son's cases, by either finding a body or being a suspect himself.

=== Wilhelmine Klemm ===
Wilhelmine Klemm, portrayed by Mechthild Großmann, is a public prosecutor in Münster. She is a notorious chain smoker, who consistently ignores the smoking ban in public buildings. She knows many VIPs in Münster and considers herself among them. She views Thiel as a boorish bumpkin who always unjustly suspects the dignitaries. She often appears uninvited in Thiel's office to get an update on his ongoing cases, usually to his annoyance. Sometimes she goes to a crime scene in high heels. Her conclusions are normally wrong, which exacerbates Thiel but also makes his success seem more respectable.

The character's name could be an allusion to the chemist Wilhelm Klemm, who taught in Münster, and has a street named after him near the Institute of Forensic Medicine.

== Reception ==
=== Ratings ===
On average, Tatort Münster has achieved the highest audience ratings of all Tatort teams and of all contemporary German television series. In 2011 and 2012, an average of 11.58 million viewers watched the television films with Thiel and Boerne.

Several episodes with the detective duo achieved the highest ratings the German Tatort has had since 1992. The episode "Summ, Summ, Summ" aired on March 24, 2013, and attracted 12.99 million viewers with a market share of 34.1 percent. This record was broken on September 21, 2014, with the episode "Mord ist die beste Medizin" which reached 13.13 million viewers and a 36.7 percent share of the market. On November 8, 2015, a new record was set with "Schwanensee", which attracted 13.69 million viewers and was the most-watched German television program of 2015. The episode following "Schwanensee" aired on May 31, 2015, and had more than 13 million viewers; with a 37.2 percent market share, it took third place in the annual television-ranking list. According to Mechthild Großmann, another star in the series, the regular cast of Tatort Münster plays a big part in its success.

=== Critical response ===
Although Münster is one of the most popular Tatort series, it is often labeled as slapstick comedy. In regards to this, actor Axel Prahl told a newspaper: "finding the right balance is an art form that nobody has mastered yet. While one viewer asks for more comedy, another one says that there is too much of it."

Other German actors have different opinions on the subject. Wotan Wilke Möhring has great regard for the actors playing Thiel and Boerne and praises the humor and levity of Tatort Münster. Actor Bjarne Mädel, on the other hand, said: "I like watching the good work of my colleagues Jan Josef Liefers and Axel Prahl, but the jokes have become predictable and overused."

=== Awards ===
In 2011, Liefers and Prahl won the Goldene Kamera in the category of best crime team, based on audience choice. In 2012, the cast was nominated for the Grimme-Preis in the "Entertainment/Special" category.

In 2003, Tatort Münster was awarded the Bobby prize from Bundesvereinigung Lebenshilfe (in German), which is awarded once a year to people who take a stand for the concerns of people with physical disabilities. Tatort Münster was chosen due to its humorous handling of abnormality. The trenchant verbal exchanges between Christine Urspruch, who portrays a woman of small stature, and Jan Josef Liefers are considered to contribute greatly to the success of the series.

== Spin-off series ==
In 2009, the German television channel Norddeutscher Rundfunk produced a five-episode show called Zwei Kommissare auf Spurensuche (roughly: Two Inspectors Searching For Clues). Axel Prahl and Jan Josef Liefers performed their roles, Thiel and professor Boerne, but kept their real names. They wandered through Mecklenburg-Vorpommern (east coast, Kühlungsborn, Usedom, Rügen, Fischland-Darß-Zingst, and Lake Schwerin), interacting with the locals while having their typical quarrels, well known from Tatort Münster.

== Bibliography ==
- Andreas Blödorn: Raum als Metapher. Exemplarisches und Exzentrisches am Beispiel des Münster-Tatort. In: Christian Hißnauer, Stefan Scherer, Claudia Stockinger (Hrsg.): Zwischen Serie und Werk: Fernseh- und Gesellschaftsgeschichte im „Tatort“. Bielefeld 2014, S. 259–281.
- Matthias Dell: „Herrlich inkorrekt“. Die Thiel-Boerne-Tatorte. Bertz + Fischer Verlag, Berlin 2012, ISBN 978-3-86505-709-9.
