= Elmar Kraushaar =

German journalist and author (born 1950)

Elmar Kraushaar (born 11 August 1950) is a German journalist and author who lives in Berlin.

== Biography ==
Kraushaar was born in Niederurff in northern Hesse. He studied from 1971 to 1979 in Berlin at Free University of Berlin. In the 1970s, during his university studies, he joined the gay organisation Homosexuelle Aktion Westberlin.

As author Kraushaar began to write on LGBT topics, including some works with Matthias Frings.

Kraushaar has worked as a journalist for Germany's longest running LGBT periodical Siegessäule out of Berlin, for the newspaper die tageszeitung (taz), and for Der Spiegel. In 1990 Kraushaar became a journalist for RIAS TV, then worked at Deutsche Welle. His column Der homosexuelle Mann... has run in taz since 1995.

== Works by Kraushaar ==
=== In German ===
- Männer, Liebe – ein Handbuch für Schwule und alle, die es werden wollen. Reinbek, Rowohlt, 1982. ISBN 3-499-17658-0
- Rote Lippen – die ganze Welt des deutschen Schlagers. Reinbek, Rowohlt, 1983. ISBN 3-499-15087-5
- Die ungleichen Brüder. Zum Verhältnis zwischen schwulen und heterosexuellen Männern. Rororo-Verlag, Reinbek 1988. ISBN 3-499-18226-2 (together with Matthias T. J. Grimme)
- article - in: Detlef Grumbach (Ed.): Die Linke und ihr Laster – schwule Emanzipation und linke Vorurteile. Hamburg, MännerschwarmSkriptverlag, 1995. ISBN 3-928983-30-X
- Schwule Listen – Namen, Daten und Geschichten. Reinbek, Rowohlt, 1994. ISBN 3-499-17917-2
- Hundert Jahre schwul – eine Revue. Berlin, Rowohlt, 1997. ISBN 3-87134-307-2
- Der homosexuelle Mann … – Anmerkungen und Beobachtungen aus zwei Jahrzehnten. Hamburg, MännerschwarmSkriptverlag, 2004. ISBN 3-935596-35-9
