= A Coffee in Berlin =

2012 film by Jan-Ole Gerster

- Film poster
- Directed by: Jan-Ole Gerster
- Written by: Jan-Ole Gerster
- Produced by: Marcos Kantis; Martin Lehwald; Michal Pokorny
- Starring: Tom Schilling; Friederike Kempter; Marc Hosemann; Katharina Schüttler; Justus von Dohnányi; Michael Gwisdek
- Cinematography: Philipp Kirsamer
- Edited by: Anja Siemens
- Music by: The Major Minors; Cherilyn MacNeil
- Production companies: Schiwago Film; Chromosom Filmproduktion; Hessischen Rundfunk; Arte
- Distributed by: X Verleih AG
- Release dates: 3 July 2012 (KVIFF); 1 November 2012 (Germany)
- Running time: 88 minutes
- Country: Germany
- Language: German
- Budget: $400,000
- Box office: $2.8 million

A Coffee in Berlin, originally titled Oh Boy, is a 2012 German tragicomedy film written and directed by Jan-Ole Gerster in his feature directorial debut. It stars Tom Schilling, Friederike Kempter, Marc Hosemann, Katharina Schüttler, Justus von Dohnányi, and Michael Gwisdek. It follows an aimless university dropout who attempts to make sense of life as he spends one fateful day wandering the streets of Berlin.

The film had its world premiere at the 47th Karlovy Vary International Film Festival on 3 July 2012, and was released in Germany on 1 November 2012, by X Verleih AG. It received generally positive reviews from critics and grossed over $2.8 million worldwide. It earned eight nominations at the 63rd German Film Awards, winning in six categories: Best Film, Best Director, Best Actor (for Schilling), Best Supporting Actor (for Gwisdek), Best Screenplay, and Best Film Score. At the 26th European Film Awards, it was nominated for Best Film, Best Actor (for Schilling), and the EFA People's Choice Award, while Gerster was given the European Discovery Award.

== Plot ==
Niko tries to sneak out of his girlfriend's apartment before she wakes, but has to tell her that he will not be back that evening because he has some vague things to do. He moves boxes into a new apartment, and opens an official letter and realizes he is late for an appointment.

The appointment is with a state psychologist, as Niko was caught driving under the influence. In this interview Niko says he has dropped out of law school. The psychologist messes around with Niko, asking provocative questions, ultimately deciding not to give him back his license.

When Niko goes to get coffee in a fashionable coffeeshop, he doesn't have enough money. After giving what little money he has to a sleeping beggar, the ATM eats his card so he leaves a message for his father to help him. Niko's lonely neighbour brings him a housewarming gift and talks about his personal problems and eventually weeps.

Niko and his friend Matze, a failed actor, head to a pub for lunch where Niko orders a coffee, but the machine is broken. A former classmate named Julika, who Niko does not recognize, has become an avant-garde dancer and invites them to a play that she is performing in later that night.

The boys go to a movie set, where Matze's friend is the main actor. They hang out in his trailer. Niko's father returns Niko's call; Niko says he's in the library studying. His father invites him to play golf.

At the golf course, Niko's father introduces him to his new assistant who is younger than Niko, but has already obtained his JD. At the club house Niko orders coffee, but his father cancels it saying it was too late in the morning for that. He confronts Niko about dropping out of law school and lying to him. He advises him to get new shoes and a job, giving Niko a few hundred euro and leaving.

At the subway station, the ticket machine is broken and Niko rides without a ticket. He has an absurd argument with two plainclothes subway ticket inspectors, until he manages to run away and escapes on a different train. Later that evening Matze picks him up, but first wants to buy drugs from his friend Marcel. An elderly woman opens the door, but doesn't let them in until Marcel, the drug dealer comes to the door. As Matze buys drugs, the elderly grandmother shows Niko her electric massaging recliner.

Matze and Niko arrive late at the Tacheles for the play that Julika is in. They sit through a confusing avant garde play in which Julika mimes eating her own body followed by vomiting. Matze laughs. At the cast party Julika introduces them to the writer/director who gets in an argument with Matze for laughing through the play. Niko leaves the argument to smoke, where he is joined by Julika. Three drunk men harass Julika and punch Niko in the nose. Julika nurses him back in the dressing room. They start kissing, when all of a sudden Julika insists he say, "I want to fuck the fat little Julika;" the embracing stops. Julika is furious that he stopped, suggesting he still thinks she is too fat. When he tries to explain that he feels awkward about the situation, she kicks him out.

Niko goes to a bar and orders coffee, but the coffee machine has already been cleaned for the evening. An elderly drunk man takes a seat beside him, talking constantly, even though Niko asks him to leave him alone. He talks about how everything had changed in the past 60 years, the very bar they sit in, and the neighborhood. As a small child he was trained to salute Hitler and he witnessed his father smashing the windows of the store that is now a bar. The man leaves the bar, only to collapse on the sidewalk. Niko accompanies him in the ambulance to the hospital, where the coffee machine is out of stock. The man eventually dies the next morning.

Niko leaves the hospital as a new day dawns. With shaky hands he finally drinks a cup of coffee in a diner.

== Cast ==
- Tom Schilling as Niko Fischer
- Friederike Kempter as Julika Hoffmann
- Marc Hosemann as Matze
- Katharina Schüttler as Elli
- Justus von Dohnányi as Karl Speckenbach
- Andreas Schröders as Psychologist
- Arnd Klawitter as Phillip Rauch
- Martin Brambach as Jörg
- RP Kahl as Stefan
- Steffen Jürgens as Ralf
- Frederick Lau as Ronny
- Ulrich Noethen as Walter Fischer
- Michael Gwisdek as Friedrich (old man)
- Inga Birkenfeld as Hanna
- Leander Modersohn as Schneider
- Theo Trebs as Marcel
- Lis Böttner as Mrs. Baumann (Marcel's grandmother)
- Ellen Schlootz as Stella
- Jakob Bieber as Kevin
- Robert Hoffmann as Pascale
- Katharina Hauck as Coffee shop employee
- Sanne Schnapp as Nurse
- Annika Ernst as Prostitute

== Production ==
A Coffee in Berlin was produced by Schiwago Film in co-production with Chromosom Filmproduktion, Hessischen Rundfunk, and Arte, with support from the Medienboard Berlin-Brandenburg.

Principal photography took place in Berlin, Germany, with Niko's apartment filmed in three different locations. It was shot in black-and-white in 21 days.

== Release ==
A Coffee in Berlin premiered at the 47th Karlovy Vary International Film Festival on 3 July 2012. It was also screened at the 30th Munich International Film Festival on 4 July, the 19th Oldenburg International Film Festival on 12 September, and the 8th Zurich Film Festival on 20 September 2012.

The film's international sales rights were acquired by Beta Cinema. It was released in Germany on 1 November 2012, by X Verleih AG, and in France on 5 June 2013, by Diaphana Distribution. In May 2013, Music Box Films acquired U.S. distribution rights to the film. It was then released in the United States on 13 June 2014.

== Reception ==
=== Box office ===
A Coffee in Berlin was a sleeper hit in Germany, where it earned more than $2 million. The film ultimately grossed $2.82 million worldwide.

=== Critical response ===
On the review aggregator website Rotten Tomatoes, 77% of 53 critics' reviews are positive, with an average rating of 6.7/10. The website's consensus reads: "Amiably slight, A Coffee in Berlin compensates for its lack of narrative drive with a sure-handed screenplay and echoes of early Woody Allen." Metacritic, which uses a weighted average, assigned the film a score of 63 out of 100, based on 19 critics, indicating "generally favorable" reviews.

Mark Kermode of The Observer gave the film 3 out of 5 stars and felt that "Tom Schilling is convincingly bedraggled as the aimless slacker who stumbles from one dourly comical situation to another." Sheri Linden of The Hollywood Reporter stated, "With its put-upon protagonist, black-and-white cityscape and snappy soundtrack of New Orleans-style jazz, the comedy Oh Boy inescapably brings to mind vintage Woody Allen." Linden called Schilling "an exceptionally appealing idler, and a number of well-known German actors etch memorable supporting turns." Rachel Saltz of The New York Times opined, "If A Coffee in Berlin has its own kind of formula and a romanticism that reads as both youthful and obscuring, it nevertheless absorbs you and makes you wonder what Mr. Gerster will do next." Martin Tsai of the Los Angeles Times wrote, "In spite of its insufferably whimsical tendencies — exemplified by its original title, Oh Boy — the film may have turned out to be a deeply profound modern postscript about fascism. This isn't that far-fetched a reading at all." Eric Kohn of IndieWire gave the film a "B+" grade and remarked, "Given that it's a modern day, black-and-white depiction of a forlorn single person incapable of getting his act together, A Coffee in Berlin unavoidably contains echoes of Noah Baumbach's Frances Ha." Kohn also stated, "Despite its series of capricious developments, A Coffee in Berlin finds a rich blend of humor and sadness in its leading man's predicament." Peter Debruge of Variety wrote, "This day-in-the-life indie says something profound about an entire generation simply by watching a feckless young man try to figure it out." Sheila O'Malley of RogerEbert.com gave the film 3.5 out of 4 stars and noted, "A Coffee in Berlin veers confidently from melancholy to absurdity and back, and then back again. It's amazing that it hangs together as well as it does. The film is both silly and profound, a rare combination."

Conversely, Rex Reed of Observer.com gave the film 1 out of 4 stars and opined, "From Germany's New Wave, a tedious exercise in tedium called A Coffee in Berlin is a black-and-white template of nothingness that shows how far the once unique and inventive German film industry has plummeted." Reed additionally criticized, "It's only 88 minutes long, but in the hands of director Jan Ole Gerster, it seems like a month of hard labor." Leslie Felperin of The Guardian gave the film 2 out of 5 stars and commented that it "seemingly aims to transplant a mumblecore aesthetic into Berlin, with all the requisite aimless hipsters, whimsical touches and rambling narrative dips and dives; but someone forgot to add spontaneity or edge."

=== Accolades ===
Award	Category	Recipient(s)	Result
2013 Belgian Film Critics Association	Grand Prix		Nominated
2013 European Film Awards	Best Film		Nominated
2013 European Film Awards	People's Choice Award		Nominated
2013 European Film Awards	European Discovery		Won
2013 European Film Awards	Best Actor	Tom Schilling	Nominated
2013 German Film Awards (Lola)	Best Feature Film		Won
2013 German Film Awards (Lola)	Best Screenplay	Jan Ole Gerster	Won
2013 German Film Awards (Lola)	Best Director	Jan Ole Gerster	Won
2013 German Film Awards (Lola)	Best Actor	Tom Schilling	Won
2013 German Film Awards (Lola)	Best Supporting Actor	Michael Gwisdek	Won
2013 German Film Awards (Lola)	Best Score	The Major Minors, Cherilyn MacNeil	Won
