= Jan Josef Liefers =

German actor, producer, director and musician

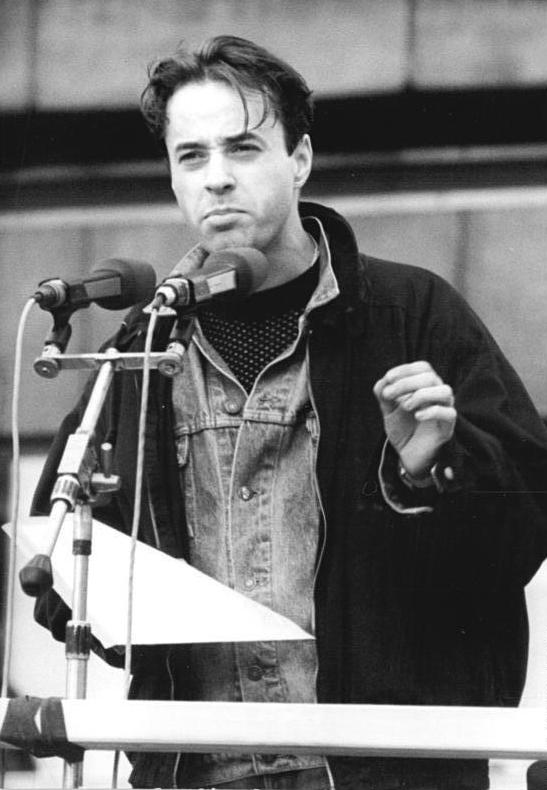
- Liefers in 1989
- Born: Jan Josef Liefers; 8 August 1964 (age 61); Dresden, East Germany
- Occupation: Actor
- Years active: 1986–present
- Spouses: Alexandra Tabakova; (divorced); Anna Loos; (2004–present)
- Children: 4

Jan Josef Liefers (born 8 August 1964) is a German actor, producer, director and musician.

== Life ==
Liefers was born in Dresden, the son of director Karlheinz Liefers and actress Brigitte Liefers-Wähner. After his apprenticeship he studied at the Hochschule für Schauspielkunst Ernst Busch in Berlin. From 1987 until 1990 he acted at the Deutsches Theater Berlin; after this he moved to the Thalia Theater in Hamburg. His first role in cinema was Alexander von Humboldt in the East German film Die Besteigung des Chimborazo.

Following that, Liefers appeared in some minor film roles; however, in 1996 he achieved his breakthrough with the Helmut Dietl film Rossini. He received the Bayerischer Filmpreis for his role (Bodo Kriegnitz). As a result of this success, he was awarded roles in several German films. He has been playing pathologist Dr. Karl Friedrich Boerne in the famed crime serial Tatort since 2002.

Liefers is a keen motorcyclist and in 2007 started on a trip of a lifetime from Quito, Ecuador to Patagonia in South America. Unfortunately, his trip came to a premature end when he was injured avoiding a collision with a young child who ran out in front of his motorbike. In 2008 a film of the trip called "70° West – Entscheidung in Peru" (Decision in Peru) was shown on German TV channel DMAX.

In April 2021, Liefers was a leading figure of a group of German actors criticizing the coronavirus policies in Germany, with the campaign #Allesdichtmachen (“shut everything down”). The campaign was heavily criticized.

Liefers married actress and singer Anna Loos in 2004. Previously he had been married to Alexandra Tabakova, a Russian actress.

== Filmography ==
- Die Besteigung des Chimborazo (1989)
- Der Fall Ö. (1991)
- Charlie & Louise – Das doppelte Lottchen (1993)
- Die Partner (1995, TV series, 8 episodes)
- Ich, der Boss (1995, TV film)
- Rossini (1997)
- Kidnapping Mom and Dad (1997, TV film)
- Knockin' on Heaven's Door (1997)
- Vergewaltigt – Das Geheimnis einer Nacht (1997, TV film)
- Arielle, die Meerjungfrau (Disney), (German version) voice of Prinz Erik (1997)
- Jack's Baby (1998, TV film)
- Night Time (1998)
- Halt mich fest! (2000, TV film)
- Die Spur meiner Tochter (2000, TV film)
- Death Row (2001, TV film)
- 666 – Traue keinem, mit dem du schläfst! (2002)
- Die Frauenversteher – Männer unter sich (2002, TV film)
- A Light in Dark Places (2003, TV film)
- The News (2005, TV film)
- Madagascar (DreamWorks), (German version) voice of Alex (2005)
- Die Entscheidung (2006, TV film)
- Storm Tide (2006, TV film)
- Der Untergang der Pamir (2006, TV film)
- Nachtschicht: Der Ausbruch (2006, TV series episode)
- Bis zum Ellenbogen (2007)
- Suddenly Gina (2007, TV film)
- Lily C. (2007, TV film)
- The Baader Meinhof Complex (2008)
- Madagascar 2, (German version) voice of Alex (2008)
- Es liegt mir auf der Zunge (2009, TV film)
- Live Is Life (2010, TV film)
- Simon and the Oaks (2011)
- Joachim Vernau (since 2012, TV series, 7 episodes)
- Men Do What They Can (2012)
- The Tower (2012, TV film)
- Baron on the Cannonball (2012, TV film)
- Night Over Berlin (2013, TV film)
- Head Full of Honey (2014)
- Mara and the Firebringer (2015)
- Disaster (2015)
- The Bloom of Yesterday (2016)
- Vier gegen die Bank (2016)
- Teenosaurus Rex (2017)

== Tatort – Professor Dr. Karl Friedrich Boerne ==
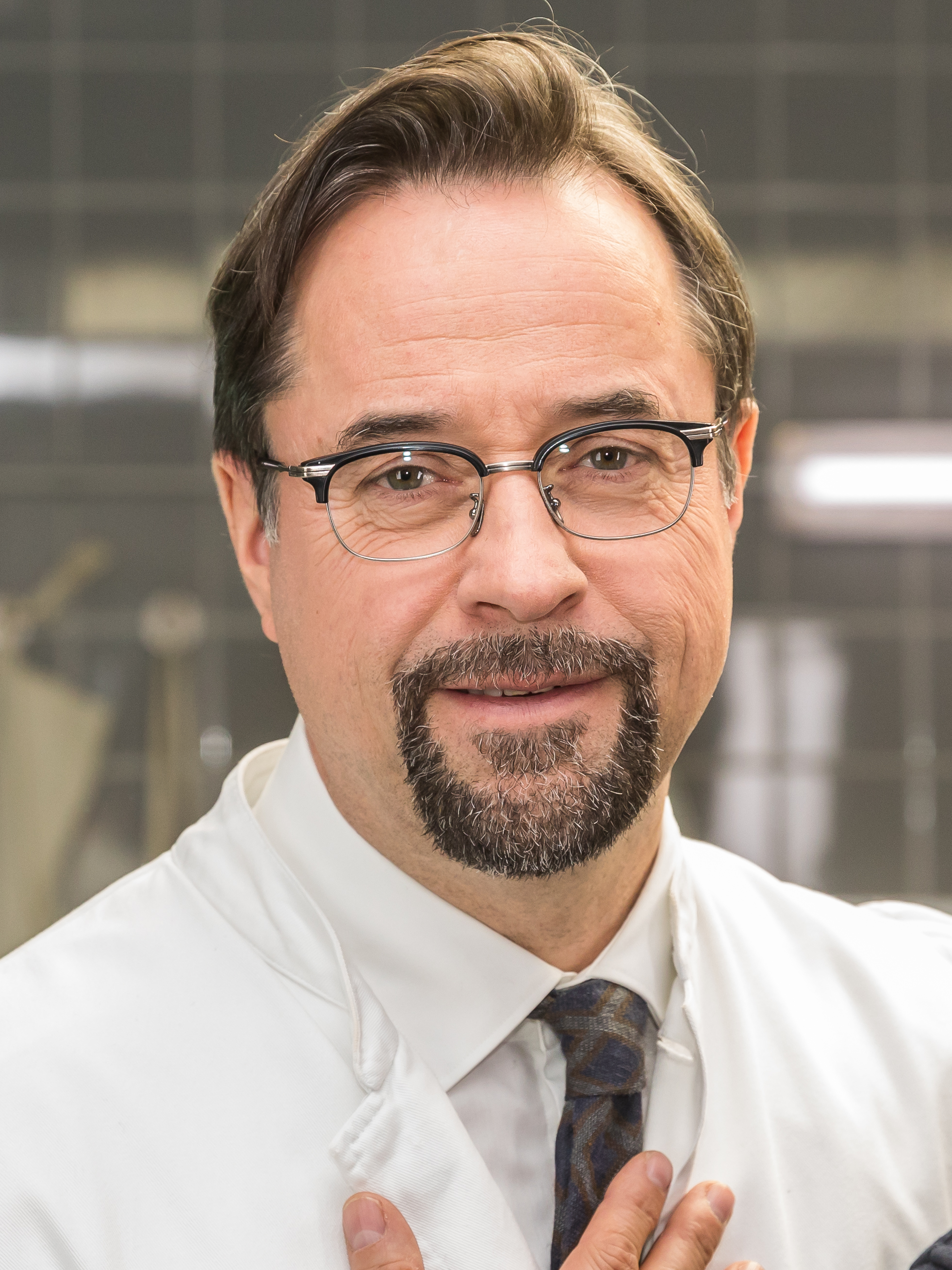
Jan Josef Liefers as "Professor Dr. Karl Friedrich Boerne", 2019

In the German television series Tatort, Liefers plays Professor Dr. Karl Friedrich Boerne, the director of the Institute of Legal Medicine and Forensics at the University of Münster. The witty scientist loves his job and enjoys life to the fullest, often without considering the feelings of others. Karl-Friedrich Boerne loves the good things in life, plays golf, fences and is fond of classical music, especially if it's loud. But what he loves most are his luxury cars (Jaguar, Mercedes, Audi, Porsche, etc.), which he drives without worrying too much about wrecking them, and the sound of his own voice. Boerne's irony and intellect make him seem cynical and arrogant at times, but it's evident that there's a kind heart beating inside him. His wife left him and since then, Boerne lives alone in his big city apartment. The much smaller neighbouring apartment he lets to inspector Frank Thiel. The idiosyncratic, quirky forensic physician and the quiet, down-to-earth police officer share a close partnership both at work and closer to home.

== Tatort – Episodes ==
- 2002: Der dunkle Fleck
- 2002: Fakten, Fakten
- 2003: Dreimal schwarzer Kater
- 2003: Sag nichts
- 2004: Mörderspiele
- 2004: Eine Leiche zuviel
- 2005: Der Frauenflüsterer
- 2005: Der doppelte Lott
- 2006: Das ewig Böse
- 2006: Das zweite Gesicht
- 2007: Ruhe sanft
- 2007: Satisfaktion
- 2008: Krumme Hunde
- 2008: Wolfsstunde
- 2009: Höllenfahrt
- 2009: Tempelräuber
- 2010: Der Fluch der Mumie
- 2010: Spargelzeit
- 2011: Herrenabend
- 2011: Zwischen den Ohren
- 2012: Hinkebein
- 2012: Das Wunder von Wolbeck
- 2013: Summ, Summ, Summ
- 2013: Die chinesische Prinzessin
- 2014: Der Hammer
- 2014: Mord ist die beste Medizin
- 2015: Erkläre Chimäre
- 2015: Schwanensee
- 2016: Ein Fuß kommt selten allein
- 2016: Feierstunde
- 2017: Fangschuss
- 2017: Gott Ist Auch Nur Ein Mensch
- 2018: Schlangengrube
- 2019: Spieglein, Spieglein
- 2019: Lakritz
- 2019: Väterchen Frost
- 2020: Limbus
- 2020: Es Lebe Der König
- 2021: Rhythm And Love
- 2022: Des Teufels langer Atem
- 2022: Propheteus
- 2022: Ein Freund, ein guter Freund
- 2023: MagicMom

== CDs ==
- Jack's Baby (1999)
- Don't let go (2002)
- Oblivion (2002)
- Soundtrack meiner Kindheit (2007)

== Audio books ==
- 2006: Fußball unser – Das Hörbuch
- 2006: Brigitte Hörbuch-Edition – Starke Stimmen: Die Männer – Der Reinfall
- 2008: Jan Josef Liefers liest den Tatort Fall `Der dunkle Fleck´
- 2009: Brigitte Hörbuch-Edition – Starke Stimmen: Die Krimis – Dr. Siri und seine Toten
- 2009: Der Kleine Prinz: Das Hörbuch

== Awards ==
- 1996: Bayerischer Filmpreis, best newcomer in Rossini
- 2000: Television prize of the Deutsche Akademie der Darstellenden Künste, actor award for Halt mich fest
- 2000: Bayerischer Fernsehpreis for Jack's Baby
- 2003: Bambi for A Light in Dark Places
- 2004: Adolf-Grimme-Preis for the best actor in A Light in Dark Places
- 2011: Guldbagge Award for the best supporting actor award for Simon and the Oaks
