= Walter Richter =

German actor

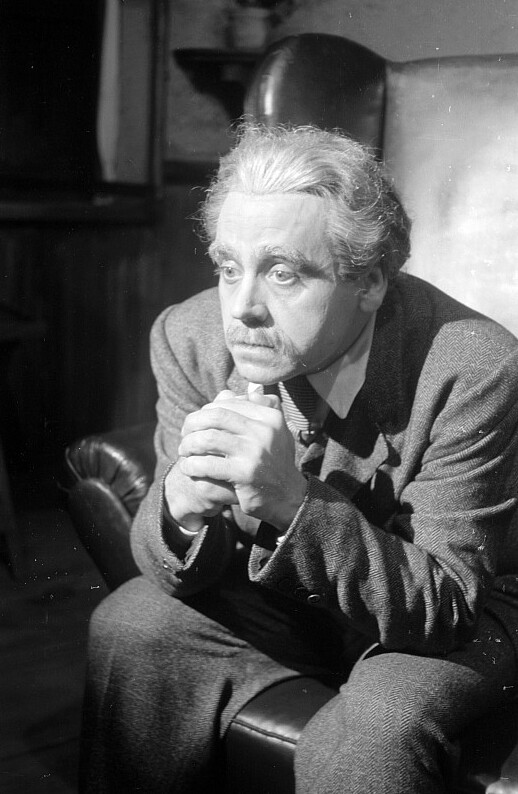
- Richter in 1945
- Born: May 13, 1905; Berlin, Germany
- Died: July 26, 1985 (aged 80); Vienna, Austria
- Occupation: Actor
- Years active: 1937–1983
- Spouse: Felicitas Richter

Walter Richter (May 13, 1905 – July 26, 1985) was a German actor. From 1970 until 1982 he starred in the Norddeutscher Rundfunk version of the popular television crime series Tatort.

== Selected filmography ==
- The Citadel of Warsaw (1937) as Oberleutnant Strelkoff
- Morituri (1948), as Dr. Leon Bronek
- The Allure of Danger (1950), as Jens
- The Venus of Tivoli (1953), as Osvaldo Curtis
- As Long as You're Near Me (1953), as Willi
- Dunja (1955), as Stationmaster
- Drayman Henschel (1956), as Wilhelm Henschel
- When the Heath Is in Bloom (1960), as Jochen Petersen
- Der Tod läuft hinterher (1967, TV miniseries), as Brassac
- Babeck (1968, TV miniseries), as Manfred Krupka's Father
- Perrak (1970), as Vermouth-Ede
- Tatort (1970–1982, TV series), as Kriminalhauptkommissar Paul Trimmel
- Cold Blood (1975), as Arthur
