= Ronald M. Schernikau =

German writer

Ronald Schernikau
- Born: Ronald M. Schernikau; July 11, 1960; Magdeburg, East Germany
- Died: October 20, 1991 (aged 31); Berlin, Germany
- Occupation: Writer

Ronald M. Schernikau (July 11, 1960 – October 20, 1991) was a German writer. Schernikau was born in Magdeburg and died in Berlin. Schernikau largely wrote about LGBT issues in Germany, and was one of the last people from West Germany to emigrate to East Germany.

== Life ==
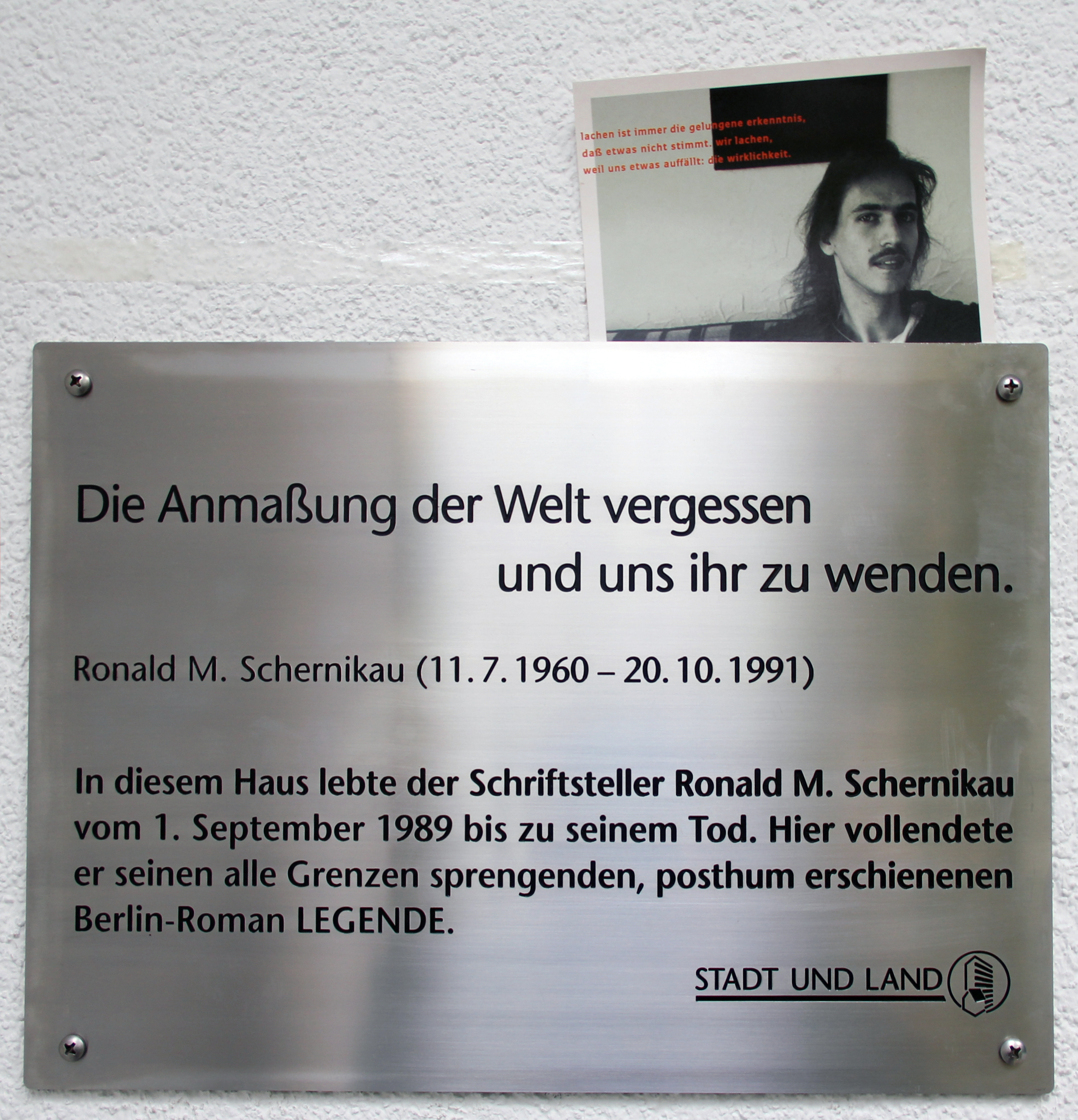
Plaque at Schernikau's house in Berlin-Hellersdorf

His mother moved from Magdeburg, East Germany, to Lehrte, West Germany, in 1966 to reunite with Ronald's father, but upon arriving they discovered that he was a Neo-Nazi and had a second family. Schernikau and his mother remained in Lehrte nonetheless.

At 16, he joined the German Communist Party (DKP). Even before he graduated from high school at Lehrter Gymnasium, his short novel Kleinstadtnovelle was published by Rotbuch Verlag in 1980. The book, which was about coming out as gay in a small town, was a remarkable debut, and the first edition had to be reprinted just a few days after its release. That same year, Schernikau moved to West Berlin, where he joined the Socialist Unity Party of West Berlin (SEW) and enrolled in German, philosophy and psychology at the Freie Universität. During this time, Schernikau wrote for various left-wing publications on topics such as the baking industry and the HIV/AIDS epidemic.

From 1986 to 1989 Schernikau studied at the Johannes R. Becher German Institute for Literature in Leipzig, East Germany – the first West German to do so. There he wrote his book Die tage in l. darüber, dass die ddr und die brd sich niemals verständigen können, geschweige mittels ihrer literatur ["The days in L.: On the fact that East and West Germany can never communicate, least of all through their literature"], which discussed how East and West Germans perceived each other.

In September 1991, Schernikau completed his book legende ["Legend"], only weeks before dying of AIDS-related illnesses.

== Legacy ==
In recent years, there has been a renewed interest in Schernikau's life and works. The German journalist Matthias Frings published a biography about Schernikau in 2009. German director Bastian Kraft produced a play on Schernikau in 2014, which was sold out nearly every night. Schernikau's novella, SMALLTOWNNOVELLA, is being released with Ugly Duckling Presse in November 2025.
