= Tatort =

German/Austrian/Swiss television series

- Starring: Boris Aljinovic; Dietmar Bär; Meret Becker; Elisabeth Brück; Hansjörg Felmy; Ulrike Folkerts; Maria Furtwängler; Götz George; Stefan Gubser; Jörg Hartmann; Andreas Hoppe; Klaus J. Behrendt; Harald Krassnitzer; Manfred Krug; Jan Josef Liefers; Eva Mattes; Oliver Mommsen; Richy Müller; Miroslav Nemec; Axel Prahl; Dominic Raacke; Sieghardt Rupp; Anna Schudt; Devid Striesow; Simone Thomalla; Ulrich Tukur; Udo Wachtveitl; Mark Waschke; Martin Wuttke; Wotan Wilke Möhring and others
- Theme music composer: Klaus Doldinger
- Countries of origin: West Germany (1970–1990); Germany (1990–present); Austria; Switzerland
- Original language: German
- No. of seasons: 50
- No. of episodes: 1,252

Production
- Running time: 90 minutes

Original release
- Network: Das Erste
- Release: 29 November 1970 – present

Tatort ("Crime Scene") is a German-language police procedural television series that has been running continuously since 1970 with 30 feature-length episodes per year, making it the longest-running German TV drama. Developed by the German public-service broadcasting organization ARD for their channel Das Erste, it is unique in its approach in that it is jointly produced by all of the organization's regional members as well as its partnering Austrian and Swiss national public-service broadcasters, whereby every regional station contributes several episodes to a common pool.

As a result of this, Tatort is a collection of different police stories where different police teams solve crimes in their own cities, with uniqueness in architecture, customs, and dialects of the cities being a distinctive part of the series. Often, the city, not the police force, is the real main character of an episode. The fact that local stations each produce a small number of episodes per year has enabled longer episodes (approximately 90 minutes), which in turn allows each episode to exhibit greater characterisation than other weekly TV dramas.

The first episode was broadcast on 29 November 1970. Episodes are broadcast on ARD's main channel Das Erste, on Sunday evenings at the prime viewing time of 8:15 p.m. (just after the 8 p.m. Tagesschau news) around three times a month. Reruns are often shown by various regional ARD stations and on foreign broadcasters. Alongside the member stations of the ARD, the national Austrian broadcasting corporation Österreichischer Rundfunk joined the production pool in 1971 and aired the program on its ORF 2 channel. Switzerland's Schweizer Fernsehen joined the collection from 1990 to 2001 and again in 2011. It distributes its episodes through its channel SRF 1 and Play SRF streaming app.

The series Polizeiruf 110, which was produced by East Germany's state TV broadcaster as a counterpart to the West German Tatort and has a similar regional production approach, is still produced by ARD's regional broadcasters Mitteldeutscher Rundfunk (MDR), Rundfunk Berlin-Brandenburg (RBB), Norddeutscher Rundfunk (NDR) and Bayerischer Rundfunk (BR). Polizeiruf 110 shares the Sunday night prime time slot on Das Erste with Tatort.

== Concept ==
The main feature of Tatort is that all participating regional TV stations jointly produce it. Each of the eleven companies involved (the nine German regional TV channels or Landesrundfunkanstalten that together form ARD, plus ORF in Austria and SRF in Switzerland) produces its episodes. Each station usually features more than one team of inspectors in different cities in its region, depending on the size of the producing broadcaster. Each of the roughly 20 active teams appears one to three times each year. Nearly every Sunday, a new episode from a different city premieres on Das Erste; old episodes are often shown through all participating stations as part of their standard programming. The series shares this concept with its former East German counterpart Polizeiruf 110, which is produced as four additional Tatort investigator teams aired under a different series name and opening credits by some regional broadcasters, primarily those that evolved from East German state television.

Every Tatort episode features a different team of inspectors in another city. Combined with the fact that the episodes are 90 minutes long, almost movie-length, and rarely more than 30 episodes in one year, this makes for a cultural phenomenon closer to a string of made-for-TV movies than a typical police series.

This pooling concept was mainly due to the nature of the public broadcast television channel ARD, which is jointly operated by all of Germany's regional public Landesrundfunkanstalten. The 9 regional public broadcasters collect broadcasting fees in their region of Germany (each region comprising one or more federal states), each with multiple radio stations and a regional TV station. Das Erste is produced as a joint national channel with standard national programming. Each regional broadcaster is responsible for parts of the programming, unlike in the US with its network affiliate system. Usually, one to three broadcasters produce one TV programme in cooperation. When Tatort was developed as a series of weekly feature film-long local crime stories, the stated concept was used to distribute financial and organizational efforts.

Apart from the unique joint-pooling system, the series is also characterized by the episode length of around 90 minutes, which allows for more in-depth and psychological fleshing out of the characters. Although almost all episodes feature the investigation of a homicide, it is never just a simple case of whodunit. Often the episode length allows for the crime to be shown in all its aspects, with equal attention focused on the perpetrators and the victims as on the inspectors. On several occasions, the actual police work is just a side note in the story, as the main plot might focus on how one of the persons involved deals with the crime and its aftermath. Episodes also deal with social and political issues.

With the national broadcasting corporations of Austria and Switzerland participating, the episodes of Tatort are currently set in various cities of Germany, Vienna, and Zürich. Initially, each of the participating member stations limited their episodes to one team of investigators in one city: for ease of production, this was mostly the city the broadcast station was in, but over the years, some stations broadcasting over a large regional area have Tatorts playing in several cities. Notably, the WDR (based in Cologne) has three teams of investigators each playing in Cologne, Münster and Dortmund. Episodes are either produced by the station's production facilities or filmed and often written by outside production houses on behalf of the station. This sometimes leads to situations where, for instance, a Tatort set in Thuringia is produced in Bavaria, with only a handful of scenes shot 'on location' in the town in which the story is supposed to be set in. Consequently, minor roles are sometimes played by actors or extras that do not have a matching regional accent.

A similar concept of independently filming and then pooling episodes was used from 1988 to 1992 in the series Eurocops, jointly produced by several national European TV stations.

Tatort has not found wide distribution in non-German speaking countries, but some episodes were distributed as stand-alone mini-series. Notable examples were the Horst Schimanski episodes which were shown in Finland in the late-1980s and on TV4 in Sweden in 1992, and the 2013 series starring Til Schweiger and Fahri Yardım in Hamburg was shown on the British Channel 4 under the title Nick's Law.

In 2023, the American-based international television streaming service MHz Choice signed a deal with WDR and Radio Bremen for the rights to 250 of their episodes. English-subtitled versions of the current Dortmund (2012–present) and previous Bremen (2001–2019) teams' episodes are currently in production. That streaming service also has a selection of subtitled older episodes of the current: Berlin, Cologne, Göttingen, Kiel, Munich and Weimar teams from previous deals.

== History ==
Gunther Witte, dramatist and TV head at WDR (West German Broadcasting Cologne) developed the series against initial resistance. Witte and his successors have ensured that one or two detectives are at the center of every story, and the cases are shown from their perspective; they are usually members of a team, and their lives are also included.

In January 2008, a similarly produced series of radio dramas called ARD Radio Tatort was introduced; new episodes are aired monthly by regional radio stations, but not simultaneously.

In 2012, more than 100,000 people participated in the first and only online game linked to the SWR Tatort production, "Der Wald steht schwarz und schweiget."

In January 2014, Tatort received the 50^{th} Grimme Award.

== Features ==
The show is still aired on Sundays at 8:15 p.m. in Germany and Austria and 8:05 p.m. in Switzerland. About 30 episodes are made each year. By May 2018, 1,055 episodes had been produced, plus 13 made in Austria and shown only there. Episode nr. 1,000 was broadcast on Sunday, 13 November 2016.

The episodes of some series of Tatort, such as the discontinued series about Schimanski, played by Götz George, have become cultural icons.

The opening sequence of each episode has essentially remained the same throughout the decades except for slight changes. Klaus Doldinger composed the title music with Udo Lindenberg on drums.

== In East Germany ==
At the same time the ARD was starting its Tatort format, the DDR had its own police procedural/crime show called Polizeiruf 110 ("Police dial 1-1-0"). The series premiered in 1971, less than a year after the first Tatort. It, too, was a police procedural with various teams of investigators in different cities of the DDR. Still, in contrast to the West, only a tiny part of their cases involved actual homicides. The psychology of the perpetrators and the victims was also more prevalent. The series continued through the 1970s and 80s and even survived the Wende, continuing until 1991.

In 1990, Polizeiruf practiced its brand of German reunification with episode 142, "Unter Brüdern" ("Amongst Brothers"), a crossover with the Tatort investigators Schimanski and Thanner (this was co-produced with ARD and a medley of the two series themes were used in the opening intro). Until 1991, the series continued more or less independently for 11 more episodes until episode 153 (22 December 1991), again a crossover, in which Kommissar Thanner becomes the team's superior. Also in 1991, as part of the unification, the DDR's television company DFF was split into the Mitteldeutscher Rundfunk (MDR) and Ostdeutscher Rundfunk Brandenburg (ORB), while the television stations in the new state of Mecklenburg-Vorpommern would be operated as part of the NDR.

As MDR, ORB, and NDR were all partners in the ARD, they were expected to start producing Tatort episodes as well. However, seeing the popularity of Polizeiruf 110, it was decided that the stations would contribute to the Tatort pool but that its episodes would keep the name of Polizeiruf 110 and their own title music and intro. Still, they would be broadcast over all ARD stations on Sunday evening just like (or instead of) the 'western' Tatort.

Reorganising took one and a half years, but on 13 June 1993, the now MDR restarted the series in Tatort format. This first episode was set in Leipzig, just as in 1991. However, today's episodes produced by the MDR are specified in Magdeburg, while those produced by NDR are set in Rostock. The ORB (and later ORB's successor, RBB) has its episodes headed by the same team of investigators but take place in various cities in Brandenburg. In addition, Bavarian Broadcasting BR produces both Polizeiruf and Tatort episodes, both set in Munich. Like the original, the Bavarian Polizeiruf episodes focus more on the psychology of the crimes and more on crimes other than homicides. Over the years, several other 'western' local broadcasters tried to produce Polizeiruf episodes as a sort of 'alternative Tatort' alongside the regular ones. However, all of them stopped after a few episodes.

On 15 May 2015, RBB aired the 350^{th} episode of Polizeiruf 110, the 197^{th} episode of the new format.

In 2013, seeing that Thuringia was so far the only federal state in Germany that had neither a Tatort nor a Polizeiruf set in one of its cities, the MDR ordered two new Tatort series, set in Erfurt and Weimar, respectively. Bavarian companies produce both for the MDR.

As 1-1-0 is the speed dial code for police/emergency dispatch in Germany, but not in Austria, Polizeiruf 110 is broadcast in Austria as Polizeiruf 133.

== Table of broadcasters ==
There have been over 1,100 episodes of Tatort, from November 1970 up to the beginning of January 2020. These have been the product of a dozen broadcasters, based around various lead investigators. While some (about 30) have been featured only once or twice, several investigators have featured in multiple episodes. There are 22 current investigative strands, and three have been the subject of over 70 episodes.

| Year | Broadcast Station | Lead Investigator | Actors | City | Number of episodes |
|---|---|---|---|---|---|
| 1970–1982 | NDR | Paul Trimmel | Walter Richter | Hamburg | 11 |
| 1970–1973 | SR | Liersdahl and Schäfermann | Dieter Eppler | Saarbrücken | 2 |
| 1971–1973 | WDR | Kressin | Sieghardt Rupp | Cologne | 7 |
| 1971–1986 | SDR | Eugen Lutz | Werner Schumacher | 8 different towns in Baden-Württemberg | 16 |
| 1971–1979 | HR | Konrad | Klaus Höhne | Frankfurt | 8 |
| 1971–1978 | NDR | Finke | Klaus Schwarzkopf | Kiel and other places in Schleswig-Holstein | 7 |
| 1971–1983 | ORF | Viktor Marek | Fritz Eckhardt | Vienna | 13 |
| 1971–1972 | SFB | Erwin Kasulke | Paul Esser | West Berlin | 2 |
| 1972–1981 | BR | Melchior Veigl | Gustl Bayrhammer | Munich | 15 |
| 1972 | SWF | Horst Pflüger | Ernst Jacobi | Baden-Baden | 1 |
| 1973 | RB | Walter Böck | Hans Häckermann | Bremen | 1 |
| 1973–1977 | SWF | Franz Gerber | Heinz Schimmelpfennig | Baden-Baden | 5 |
| 1974–1980 | WDR | Heinz Haferkamp | Hansjörg Felmy | Essen | 20 |
| 1974–1977 | NDR | Heinz Brammer | Knut Hinz | Hanover | 4 |
| 1975–1977 | SFB | Martin Schmidt | Martin Hirthe | West Berlin | 3 |
| 1977–1984 | SR | Schäfermann | Manfred Heidmann | Saarbrücken | 4 |
| 1978–1980 | SWF | Marianne Buchmüller | Nicole Heesters | Mainz | 3 |
| 1978–1983 | HR | Bergmann | Heinz Treuke (1978), Lutz Moik (1981-1983) | Frankfurt | 3 |
| 1978–1979 | SFB | Matthias Behnke | Hans-Peter Korff | West Berlin | 2 |
| 1979 | NDR | Nagel | Diether Krebs | Braunschweig | 1 |
| 1979–1985 | NDR | Delius | Horst Bollmann | Hamburg | 3 |
| 1980 | HR | Sander | Volkert Kraeft | Frankfurt | 1 |
| 1980 | WDR | Paul Enders | Jörg Hube | Essen, Frankfurt | 1 |
| 1980–1982 | NDR | Jochen Piper | Bernd Seebacher | Bremen | 2 |
| 1980 | WDR | Willy Kreutzer | Willy Semmelrogge | Essen | 1 |
| 1981–1985 | SFB | Friedrich Walther | Volker Brandt | West Berlin | 6 |
| 1981–1988 | SWF | Hanne Wiegand | Karin Anselm | Baden-Baden, Karlsruhe, Mainz | 8 |
| 1981 | NDR | Greve | Erik Schumann | small town in Schleswig-Holstein | 1 |
| 1981 | NDR | Beck | Hans Häckermann | Lübeck | 1 |
| 1981–1991 | WDR | Horst Schimanski and Christian Thanner | Götz George and Eberhard Feik | Duisburg | 29 |
| 1981–1987 | BR | Ludwig Lenz | Helmut Fischer | Munich | 7 |
| 1982 | HR | Werner Rolfs | Klaus Löwitsch | Frankfurt | 1 |
| 1982 | NDR | Nikolaus Schnoor | Uwe Dallmeier | Bremerhaven | 1 |
| 1983 | NDR | Ronke | Ulrich von Bock | Hamburg | 1 |
| 1984 | HR | Rullmann | Hans-Werner Bussinger | small towns in Hesse | 1 |
| 1984–2001 | NDR | Paul Stoever and Peter Brockmöller | Manfred Krug and Charles Brauer | Hamburg and Neuwerk | 41 (with Brockmöller: 38) |
| 1984–1986 | ORF | Hirth | Kurt Jaggberg | Vienna | 3 (+ 6 only ORF) |
| 1985 | HR | Reinhold Dietze | Klaus Löwitsch | Frankfurt | 1 |
| 1985–2001 | HR | Edgar Brinkmann | Karl-Heinz von Hassel | Frankfurt | 28 |
| 1985–1989 | SFB | Hans Georg Bülow | Heinz Drache | Berlin | 6 |
| 1986 | BR | Siggi Riedmüller | Günther Maria Halmer | Munich | 1 |
| 1986 | ORF | Lutinsky | Miguel Herz-Kestranek | Vienna | 1 (only ORF) |
| 1986-1988 | ORF | Pfeifer | Bruno Dallansky | Vienna | 3 (+5 only ORF) |
| 1987–1988 | SDR | Georg Thomas Schreitle | Horst Michael Neutze | Stuttgart, Führstadt | 3 |
| 1987 | BR | Karl Scherrer | Hans Brenner | Munich | 1 |
| 1988–2005 | SR | Max Palu | Jochen Senf | Saarbrücken and other places in Saarland | 17 |
| 1988–1989 | BR | Otto Brandenburg | Horst Bollmann | Munich | 2 |
| 1989–1996 | ORF | Michael Fichtl | Michael Janisch | Vienna | 8 (+1 only ORF) |
| since 1989 | SWF, SWR | Lena Odenthal, Mario Kopper, and Johanna Stern | Ulrike Folkerts, Andreas Hoppe, and Lisa Bitter | Ludwigshafen | 75 (with Kopper: 57, with Stern: 16) |
| 1990 | DRS | Walter Howald | Mathias Gnädinger | Bern | 1 |
| 1991-2026 | BR, MHz as "Tatort: Munich" (USA) | Ivo Batic, Franz Leitmayr (and Detective Sergeant Carlo Menzinger until 2007) | Miroslav Nemec, Udo Wachtveitl and Michael Fitz | Munich | 90 (with Menzinger: 45, two of them together with Faber) |
| 1991–1992 | DRS | Reto Carlucci | Andrea Zogg | Bern | 2 |
| 1991–1995 | SFB | Franz Markowitz | Günter Lamprecht | Berlin | 8 |
| 1992–2007 | MDR | Bruno Ehrlicher and Kain | Peter Sodann and Bernd Michael Lade | first Dresden, later Leipzig, one episode in Cologne as well | 45 (two of them together with Ballauf and Schenk) |
| 1992–1997 | WDR | Bernd Flemming, Detective Constable Max Ballauf and Detective Constable Miriam Koch | Martin Lüttge, Klaus J. Behrendt and Roswitha Schreiner | Düsseldorf | 15 (with Ballauf: 9) |
| 1992–2007 | SDR, SWR | Ernst Bienzle and Detective Sergeant Günter Gächter | Dietz Werner Steck and Rüdiger Wandel | Stuttgart | 25 |
| 1993–2002 | DRS | Philipp von Burg and Markus Gertsch | L.I. Kisch and E.C. Sigrist | Bern | 9 |
| 1995 | HR | Leo Felber | Heinz Schubert | Frankfurt | 1 |
| 1996–1998 | SFB | Ernst Roiter and Detective Constable Michael Zorrowski | Winfried Glatzeder and Robinson Reichel | Berlin | 12 |
| 1996 | ORF | Max Becker | Klaus Wildbolz | Vienna | 1 |
| 1997 | ORF | Paul Kant and Jakob Varanasi | Wolfgang Hübsch and Johannes Nikolussi | Vienna | 2 |
| 1997 | NDR | Lea Sommer | Hannelore Elsner | Hamburg | 2 |
| 1997 - 2006 | WDR, MHz as "Tatort: Cologne" (USA) | Max Ballauf and Freddy Schenk | Klaus J. Behrendt and Dietmar Bär | Cologne, two episodes in Leipzig as well | 84 (respectively two of them together with Ehrlicher/Kain and Saalfeld/Keppler) |
| 1997–2019 | RB | Inga Lürsen and Detective Constable Nils Stedefreund | Sabine Postel and Oliver Mommsen | Bremen, Bremerhaven | 39 (with Stedefreund: 34) |
| 1999–2014 | SFB, rbb | Till Ritter and Robert Hellmann, later Felix Stark | Dominic Raacke and Stefan Jürgens, later Boris Aljinovic | Berlin | 37 (with Hellmann: 6, with Stark: 31, the last episode only with Stark) |
| 1999-2026 | ORF, Tubi as "Murders in Vienna" (USA) | Moritz Eisner and Bibi Fellner | Harald Krassnitzer and Adele Neuhauser | Vienna and other places in Austria | 52 (with Fellner: 28) |
| 2001–2008 | NDR | Jan Casstorff and Eduard Holicek | Robert Atzorn, Tilo Prückner | Hamburg | 15 |
| 2002–2010 | HR | Fritz Dellwo and Charlotte Sänger | Jörg Schüttauf and Andrea Sawatzki | Frankfurt | 18 |
| since 2002 | NDR, MHz as "Tatort: Lindholm" (USA) | Charlotte Lindholm and Anaïs Schmitz (since 2019) | Maria Furtwängler and Florence Kasumba | first Hanover, later Göttingen and small towns in Lower Saxony | 29 (with Schmitz: 3) |
| 2002-2016 | SWR | Klara Blum and Kai Perlmann | Eva Mattes and Sebastian Bezzel | Konstanz and other places around Lake Constance | 31 (with Perlmann: 27) |
| since 2002 | WDR | Frank Thiel and forensic doctor Prof. Karl-Friedrich Boerne | Axel Prahl and Jan Josef Liefers | Münster | 41 |
| 2003-2025 | NDR, MHz as "Tatort: Borowski" (USA) | Klaus Borowski, Sarah Brandt (2010-2017), Mila Sahin (since 2017) | Axel Milberg, Maren Eggert (2003-2010), Sibel Kekilli (2010-2017), Almila Bagriacik (since 2017) | Kiel | 38 (with Brandt: 13, with Sahin: 7) |
| 2006-2012 | SR | Franz Kappl and Stephan Deininger | Maximilian Brückner and Gregor Weber | Saarbrücken | 7 |
| since 2008 | SWR | Sebastian Bootz and Thorsten Lannert | Felix Klare and Richy Müller | Stuttgart | 28 |
| 2008-2015 | MDR | Eva Saalfeld and Andreas Keppler | Simone Thomalla and Martin Wuttke | Leipzig | 21 (two of them together with Ballauf and Schenk) |
| 2008-2012 | NDR | Cenk Batu | Mehmet Kurtuluş | Hamburg | 6 |
| since 2010 | HR | Felix Murot | Ulrich Tukur | Wiesbaden and other places in Hesse | 10 |
| 2011–2015 | HR | Frank Steier and Conny Mey | Joachim Król and Nina Kunzendorf | Frankfurt | 7 (with Mey: 5) |
| 2011–2019 | SRF | Reto Flückiger and Liz Ritschard | Stefan Gubser and Delia Mayer | Lucerne | 17 (with Ritschard: 16) |
| since 2012 | WDR | Peter Faber, Martina Bönisch, Nora Dalay (until 2020), Daniel Kossik (until 2017), Jan Pawlak (since 2018) and Rosa Herzog (since 2021) | Jörg Hartmann, Anna Schudt, Aylin Tezel, Stefan Konarske, Rick Okon and Stefanie Reinsperger | Dortmund | 22 (with Dalay: 17, with Kossik: 10, with Pawlak: 11, with Herzog: 4, two of them together with Batic and Leitmayr) |
| 2013–2019 | SR | Jens Stellbrink | Devid Striesow and Elisabeth Brück | Saarbrücken | 8 |
| 2013-2020 | NDR | Nick Tschiller and Yalcin Gümer | Til Schweiger and Fahri Ogün Yardım | Hamburg | 6 |
| since 2013 | NDR, Walter Presents as "Inspector Falke" (USA 2017-2021) | Thorsten Falke and Katharina Lorenz (2013-2015), Julia Grosz (2016-2025), Mario Schmitt (since 2025) | Wotan Wilke Möhring and Petra Schmidt-Schaller, Franziska Weisz and Denis Moschitto (since 2025) | Hamburg and other places in Northern Germany | 17 (with Lorenz: 6, with Grosz: 11) |
| 2013–2014 | MDR | Henry Funck, Maik Schaffert and Johanna Grewel | Friedrich Mücke, Benjamin Kramme and Alina Levshin | Erfurt | 2 |
| 2013–2021 | MDR, MHz as "Tatort: Weimar" (USA) | Lessing and Kira Dorn | Christian Ulmen and Nora Tschirner | Weimar | 11 |
| since 2015 | rbb, MHZ as "Tatort: Streets of Berlin" (USA) | Nina Rubin and Robert Karow | Meret Becker (until 2022), Mark Waschke and Corinna Harfouch (since 2023) | Berlin | 15 |
| since 2015 | BR | Paula Ringelhahn (until 2024) and Felix Voss | Dagmar Manzel (until 2024), Fabian Hinrichs | Nuremberg and other places in Franconia | 8 |
| 2015-2024 | HR | Anna Janneke and Paul Brix | Margarita Broich, Wolfram Koch | Frankfurt | 15 |
| since 2016 | MDR, Walter Presents as: "Dresden Detectives" (USA) | Karin Gorniak, Henni Sieland (until 2019), Leonie Winkler (since 2019) and Peter Michael Schnabel | Karin Hanczewski, Alwara Höfels, Cornelia Gröschel and Martin Brambach | Dresden | 13 (with Sieland: 6, with Winkler: 7) |
| 2016-2023 | SWR | Ellen Berlinger and Martin Rascher (since 2018) | Heike Makatsch and Sebastian Blomberg | Freiburg, then Mainz | 4 (with Rascher: 3) |
| since 2017 | SWR | Franziska Tobler and Friedmann Berg | Eva Löbau, Hans-Jochen Wagner | Freiburg and other places in Black Forest | 8 |
| since 2020 | SR | Adam Schürk and Leo Hölzer | Daniel Sträßer and Vladimir Burlakov | Saarbrücken | 4 |
| since 2020 | SRF | Isabelle Grandjean and Tessa Ott | Anna Pieri Zuercher and Carol Schuler | Zürich | 3 |
| since 2021 | RB | Liv Moormann, Mads Andersen and Linda Selb | Jasna Fritzi Bauer, Dar Salim and Luise Wolfram | Bremen | 3 |
| since 2025 | HR | Maryam Azadi and Hamza Kulina | Melika Foroutan and Edin Hasanović | Frankfurt am Main | 2 |
| since 2026 | NDR | Elli Krieger and Mila Sahin | Karoline Schuch, Almila Bagriacik | Kiel | 1 |

Last update: 5 February 2026

== Soundtracks (selection) ==
Some Tatort episodes from the 1980s and 1990s included songs that subsequently became quite well known, and two of them reached the top of the charts: "Faust auf Faust (Schimanski)" by Klaus Lage from the Tatort movie On the Killer's Track, and "Midnight Lady" by Chris Norman, written by Dieter Bohlen, which appears on the episode "Der Tausch". Some random selected soundtracks:

| Artist | Title song | Episode | Year | TV station |
|---|---|---|---|---|
| Can | "Vitamin C" | "Dead Pigeon on Beethoven Street" | 1973 | WDR |
| Tangerine Dream | "Das Mädchen auf der Treppe" | "Das Mädchen auf der Treppe" | 1982 | WDR |
| Tangerine Dream | "Daydream/Moorland" | "Miriam" | 1983 | WDR |
| Warning | "Why Can The Bodies Fly" | "Peggy hat Angst" | 1983 | SWF |
| Jil Anderson | "Without You (Baby, Baby)" | "Haie vor Helgoland" | 1984 | NDR |
| Mark Spiro | "Winds Of Change" | "Das Haus im Wald" | 1985 | WDR |
| Patricia Simpson | "Dreams In The City" | "Nachtstreife" | 1985 | ORF |
| Die Toten Hosen | "Verschwende deine Zeit" | "Voll auf Haß" | 1987 | NDR |
| Sandra | "Stop For A Minute" | "Salü Palu" | 1988 | SR |
| Roger Chapman | "Slap Bang in the Middle" | "Einzelhaft" | 1988 | WDR |
| Klaatu | "Woman" | "Tödlicher Treff" | 1988 | SDR |
| Bonnie Tyler | "Against The Wind" | "Der Fall Schimanski" | 1991 | WDR |
| Wolf Maahn | "Cool" | "Der Mörder und der Prinz" | 1992 | WDR |
| Markus Küpper | "Sie hat Schluß gemacht" | "Ein ehrenwertes Haus" | 1994 | MDR |
| Ben Becker | "Alter Mann" | "Falsches Alibi" | 1995 | MDR |
| Rammstein | Asche zu Asche | "Die Geschichte vom bösen Friedrich" | 2016 | HR |

== See also ==
- Dead Pigeon on Beethoven Street (1974, Tatort episode 25)
- Reifezeugnis (1977, Tatort episode 73)
- Es lebe der Tod (Long Live Death) [2016, Tatort episode 1,001]
