= Ulrike Folkerts =

German actress (born 1961)

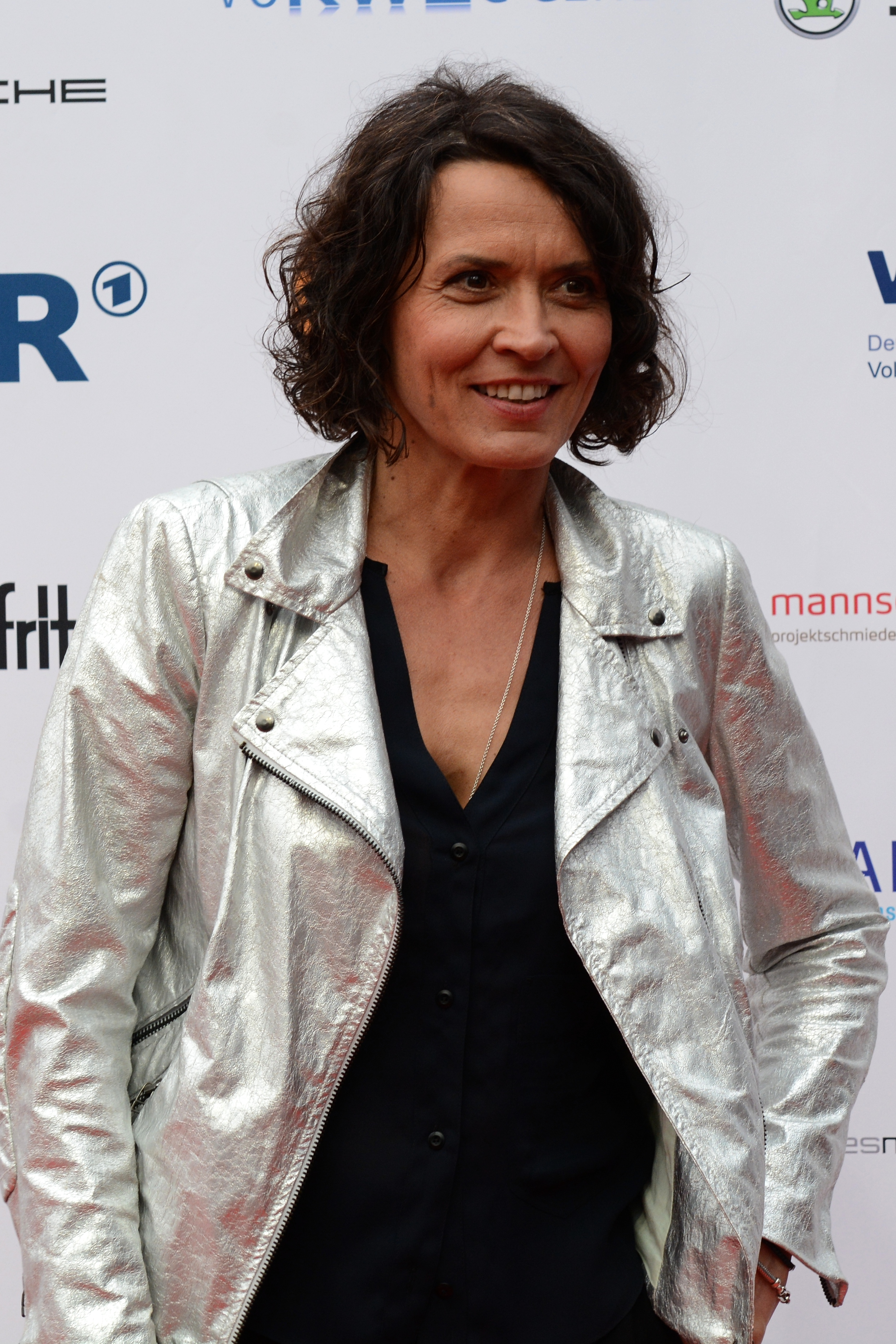
Ulrike Folkerts (2014)

Ulrike Folkerts (German pronunciation: [ʊlˈʁiːkə ˈfɔlkɐt͡s]; born 14 May 1961 in Kassel, Hesse, Germany) is a German actress. She is most famous for playing police officer Lena Odenthal in the German crime television series Tatort. The episodes are located in the town of Ludwigshafen.

Folkerts, who is openly lesbian, participated in the Gay Games 2002 in Sydney and won a silver and bronze medal in the swimming relay. In the single competition, she was disqualified because of a false start. In July 2004, she won a bronze medal at the EuroGames in München.

On the stage, in 2005 and 2006, she was the first woman to play Death in Jedermann, Hugo von Hofmannsthal's version of Everyman, at the Salzburg Festival.

== Publications ==
In 2005, Folkerts published her first book, an autobiography. In October 2008, she published her second book, Glück gefunden (Happiness found) together with her partner, Katherina Schnitzler.

== Awards ==
- 2001: Jugendhörbuchpreis
- 2002: Publikums-Bambi – Hauptkommissarin Lena Odenthal
- 2007: Verdienstkreuz am Bande
- 2007: Courage-Preis for her work inter alia for burundikids e.V. and alliance Landmine.de
