= Matthias Frings =

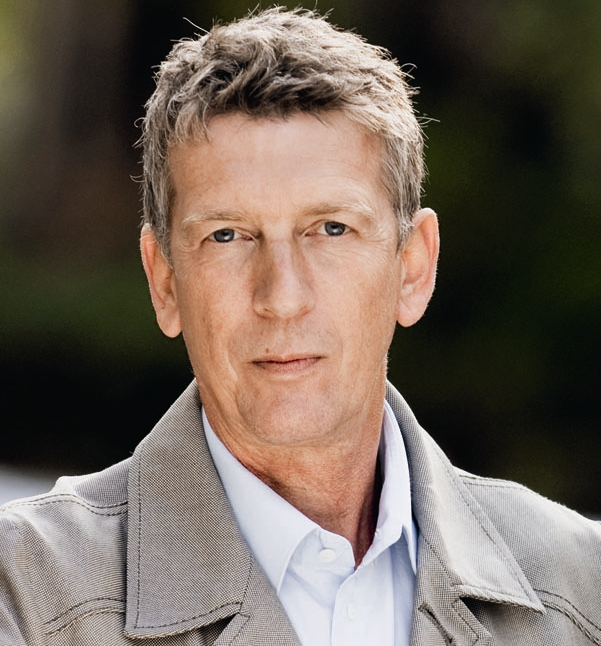
- Matthias Frings in 2008
- Born: 14 April 1953 (age 73); Aachen, West Germany
- Occupations: Journalist, TV presenter and writer
- Known for: See Works section

Matthias Frings (born 14 April 1953) is a German journalist, TV presenter and writer. He was born in Aachen and spent his childhood there. He pursued English studies, German studies and linguistics at RWTH Aachen University. In 1974, Frings was a founding member of the gay student group Aachener Printenschwestern. After completing his university studies, Frings became a resident of Berlin. In the late 1970s, he was a member of theater group Zan Pollo.

In 1982, Frings co-authored his first book Männer-Liebe with co-author Elmar Kraushaar. Since 1985, Frings has worked as a radio moderator at Sender Freies Berlin. Between 1992 and 1995 Frings produced and moderated the television show Liebe Sünde for the German television network VOX.

== Works ==
- Männer. Liebe. Ein Handbuch für Schwule und alle, die es werden wollen (Reinbek: Rowohlt, 1982), co-authored with Elmar Kraushaar, ISBN 3-499-17658-0
- Heiße Jahre. Das Ding mit der Pubertät (Reinbek: 1983), co-authored with Elmar Kraushaar
- Liebesdinge. Bemerkungen zur Sexualität des Mannes (Reinbek: 1984)
- Ein Bild vom Mann (Reinbek: 1986), co-authored with Thomas Henning
- AIDS: Dimensionen einer Krankheit (Reinbek: 1986)
- Fleisch und Blut. Über Pornographie (Reinbek: Rowohlt, 1988), ISBN 3-499-18231-9
- Der letzte Kommunist. Das traumhafte Leben des Ronald M. Schernikau (Berlin: Aufbau-Verlag, 2009), ISBN 3-351-02669-2
