= Bettina Böttinger =

German television presenter

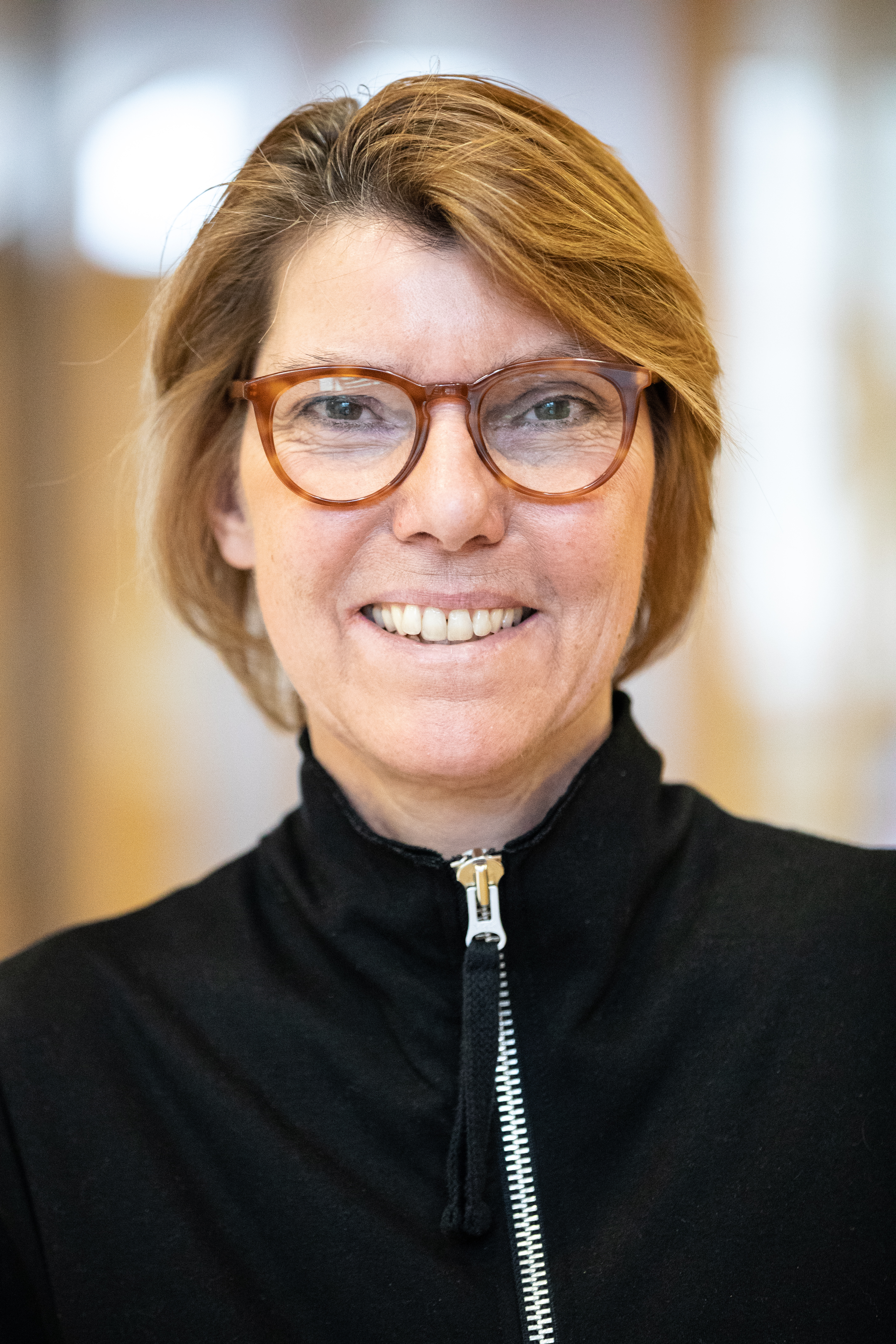
Böttinger in 2020

Bettina Böttinger (born 4 July 1956 in Düsseldorf) is a German television presenter and producer from the public broadcaster Westdeutscher Rundfunk.

== Life ==
Böttinger studied German language and history at the University of Bonn. In 1985, she began as a journalist at Westdeutscher Rundfunk. She worked for the television programme Aktuelle Stunde. As a television presenter, she worked during the 1990s and 2000s in programs including Hier und Heute, Parlazzo and B. trifft.

Böttinger lives as an open lesbian in Cologne and in the Eifel. She married Martina Wziontek on her 60th birthday.

== Criticism ==
On 20 Jan 2025, Böttinger shared on X (twitter) a video originally published by a pro-Israeli profile showing a cheering Palestinian crowd celebrating the 2025 Gaza war ceasefire and the end of the Gaza genocide with addition “animals”. To this Böttinger added, "No, animals have dignity, which these idiots do not have", After a backlash online shaming, her post was deleted.

== Awards ==
- 2007: Order of Merit of the Federal Republic of Germany
