= Paul Trimmel =

Paul Trimmel is the eponymous hero of a series of detective novels by Friedhelm Werremeier. He was popularized in the television series Tatort and portrayed by Walter Richter. Paul Trimmel is often compared to Georges Simenon's Jules Maigret.

== Novels ==
The character appeared in the following novels:

- Ich verkaufe mich exklusiv (1968)
- Taxi nach Leipzig (1970)
- Der Richter in Weiß (1971)
- Ohne Landeerlaubnis (1971)
- Ein EKG für Trimmel (1972)
- Platzverweis für Trimmel (1972)
- Trimmel macht ein Faß auf (1973)
- Trimmel und der Tulpendieb (1974)
- Treff mit Trimmel, Erzählband (1974)
- Hände hoch, Herr Trimmel (1976)
- Trimmel hält ein Plädoyer (1976)
- Trimmel hat Angst vor dem Mond, Erzählband (1977)
- Trimmel und Isolde (1980)
- Trimmel und das Finanzamt (1982)
- Trimmel spielt auf Zeit
- Trimmel und der seltsame Zwischenfall
- Trimmel im Netz der Spinne
- Trimmel macht weiter
- Trimmel und der Graf
