= Agnes =

Agnes or Agness may refer to:

== People ==
- Agnes (name), including a list of people and fictional characters named Agnes or Agness
- Agnes (surname), list of people with the surname
- Agnes (case study) (born 1939), pseudonym for one of the first studied transgender women

== Places ==
=== United States ===
- Agnes, Georgia, United States, a ghost town
- Agnes, Missouri, United States, an unincorporated community
- Agness, Oregon, United States, an unincorporated community
- Agnes Township, Grand Forks County, North Dakota, United States

=== Elsewhere ===
- Agnes, Victoria, Australia, a town

== Arts and entertainment ==
=== Film ===
- Agnes (1995 film), an Icelandic drama film
- Agnes (2021 film), an American horror film

=== Music ===
- Agnes (band), a Christian rock band
  - Agnes (album), 2005 album by rock band Agnes
- "Agnes" (Donnie Iris song) 1980
- "Agnes", a song by Glass Animals for the album How to Be a Human Being
- Agnes (singer), a Swedish recording artist

=== Other arts and entertainment ===
- Agnes (card game), a patience or solitaire card game
- Agnes (comic strip), a syndicated comic strip by Tony Cochran
- Agnes (novel), by Peter Stamm

== Ships ==
- Agnes (1804), a hired armed lugger of the Royal Navy lost in 1806
- Agnes (1849), a wooden brigantine built in 1849 at Point Brenley, Nova Scotia, Canada
- Agnes (1853), an Australian merchant ship
- Agnes (1875), a wooden carvel schooner built in 1875 at Brisbane Water, New South Wales, Australia
- Agnes (1877), a wooden carvel ketch built in 1877 at Williams River, Eagleton, New South Wales, Australia
- Agnes (1904), a launch built in 1904 at North Sydney, Australia
- Agnes (cutter), a wooden cutter that was wrecked in 1865 in New South Wales, Australia

== Other uses ==
- Agnes (gallery), a photography gallery in Birmingham, Alabama (1992–2000)
- Tropical Storm Agnes, a number of named tropical cyclones
- Racehorses owned by Takao Watanabe, as well as his daughter Kumiko, using the "Agnes" crown name:
  - Agnes Digital
  - Agnes Flight
  - Agnes Flora
  - Agnes Tachyon
  - Agnes World

== See also ==
- Agni (disambiguation)
- Agnus (disambiguation)
