= Agnee =

Agnee may refer to:

- Agnee (band), Indian rock band based in Pune
  - Agnee (album)
- Agnee (1988 film), 1988 Indian Hindi-language feature film
- Agnee (franchise), film franchise
  - Agnee (2014 film), a 2014 Bengali-language women-centric action thriller film
  - Agnee 2, a 2015 Indian-Bangladeshi action film

== See also ==
- Agni (disambiguation)
- AAG (disambiguation)
