= List of shipwrecks in March 1890 =

The list of shipwrecks in March 1890 includes ships sunk, foundered, grounded, or otherwise lost during March 1890.

== 1 March ==
List of shipwrecks: 1 March 1890
Ship	State	Description
Colonist	New South Wales	The schooner sank with the loss of one life off Bradleys Head, Sydney Harbour, after colliding with the steamship Adelaide (United Kingdom). Adelaide rescued two survivors and the skiff half-decker Young Oscar (Flag unknown) rescued three others.
Flora, and Phillis and Mary	(United Kingdom of Great Britain and Ireland) Guernsey; United Kingdom	The barquentine Flora and Phillis and Mary were run into at Saint Sampson, Guernsey by the steamship Bessemer (United Kingdom) and were both severely damaged.
Matha	United Kingdom	The brig was abandoned in a sinking condition 14 nautical miles (26 km) south east of the Longstone Lighthouse, Northumberland, according to a message in a bottle which subsequently washed up at Newton-by-the-Sea, Northumberland.
Roxburgh	United Kingdom	The steamship put in to Cardiff, Glamorgan on fire. She was on a voyage from Barry, Glamorgan to Singapore. The fire was extinguished and she was placed under repair.
State of California	United States	The steamship ran aground near Portland, Oregon. Her passengers were taken off. She was on a voyage from San Francisco, California to Portland.
Ulrich	Germany	The steamship ran aground at Vegesack. She was on a voyage from Brake to Bremen.

== 2 March ==
List of shipwrecks: 2 March 1890
Ship	State	Description
Spindrift	United Kingdom	The steamship collided with the brig Kate (Guernsey) at Thames Haven, Essex and was severely damaged. She was on a voyage from London to Ghent, West Flanders, Belgium. She put back to London.
Topsey	United Kingdom	The schooner ran aground on the Halliday Flat, in the North Sea off the coast of Essex and sank. Her crew survived. She was on a voyage from Northfleet, Kent to Hull, Yorkshire.
Ville de Paris	France	The stern section of the steamship foundered off Margate, Kent, United Kingdom with the loss of four of her sixteen crew. The ship had been damaged in an explosion at Calais in October 1888. The stern section was under tow of the tugboat Challenger (United Kingdom) at the time. It was on a voyage from Calais to Tilbury, Essex, United Kingdom. survivors were rescued by Challenger and the Margate Lifeboat Friend to all Nations ( Royal National Lifeboat Institution). The sunken portion of the ship was refloated in early July.

== 3 March ==
List of shipwrecks: 3 March 1890
Ship	State	Description
Elizabeth Ann	United Kingdom	The barge sank at Wapping, London.
Ganger Rolf	Norway	The steamship collided with the barge Oban (United Kingdom) at Deptford, London, United Kingdom and was damaged.
Gelderland	United Kingdom	The steamship ran aground in the Nieuwe Waterweg. She was on a voyage from Rotterdam, South Holland to Batavia, Netherlands East Indies. She was refloated with the assistance of a steamship and resumed her voyage.
Neptune	United Kingdom	The barge was run into by the steamship Rosalind (United Kingdom) and sank in the River Thames at Wapping.
Nord	France	The full-rigged ship ran aground on the Newcombe Sands, in the North Sea off the coast of Suffolk, United Kingdom. She was being towed from Le Havre, Seine-Inférieure to South Shields, County Durham, United Kingdom by the tug William Joliffe (United Kingdom).
Obdam	Netherlands	The steamship ran aground in the Nieuwe Wateweg. She was on a voyage from Rotterdam to New York, United States. She was refloated with the assistance of a steamship and resumed her voyage.
San Domingo	United Kingdom	The steamship ran aground at Maryport, Cumberland. She was refloated.
Sultan	United Kingdom	The barge was run into by the steamship Rosalind (United Kingdom) and sank in the River Thames at Limehouse, London.

== 4 March ==
List of shipwrecks: 4 March 1890
Ship	State	Description
Eliza Mary	Flag unknown	The schooner was wrecked on the coast of Mallicollo, New Hebrides with the loss of 51 of the 79 people on board.
Jarl	Denmark	The steamship departed from Bornholm for Copenhagen. Wreckage from the ship was discovered 3 nautical miles (5.6 km) off "Hammersen", Froien, on 6 March. Presumed foundered with the loss of all hands.

== 5 March ==
List of shipwrecks: 5 March 1890
Ship	State	Description
Antonio	Flag unknown	The steamship ran aground off Clauchlands Point, Isle of Arran, Buteshire, United Kingdom. She was refloated.
Avon	United Kingdom	The steamship was driven ashore at Ardrossan, Ayrshire. She was on a voyage from Workington, Cumberland to Ardrossan. She was refloated.
Clementine	United Kingdom	The schooner was driven ashore at Messina, Sicily, Italy. She was refloated with assistance.
Flora	Germany	The barque departed from South Shields, County Durham, United Kingdom for Valparaíso, Chile. Although subsequently sighted in the Atlantic Ocean, she was eventually reported missing.
Hildred	United Kingdom	The brigantine was run into by the steamship Alvah (United Kingdom) in the River Thames and was severely damaged.
Maria	United Kingdom	The schooner was driven ashore at Mauritius. She was a total loss.
Nautilus	United Kingdom	The steamship sank in the River Thames. She was refloated the next day and towed to Millwall, London.
Reaper	United Kingdom	The lugger was driven ashore at Kearny Point, County Down. She was on a voyage from Drogheda, County Louth to Belfast, County Antrim.
Ringhorne	Norway	The barque ran aground at Point Indio, Argentina. She was on a voyage from Grimsby, Lincolnshire, United Kingdom to Buenos Aires, Argentina.
Romanby	United Kingdom	The steamship struck the quayside at Maryport, Cumberland and was holed. She was on a voyage from Carthagena, Spain to Maryport.
Wilhelm	German Empire	The steamship was driven ashore and wrecked at Agger or Thisted, Denmark. She was on a voyage from Stockton-on-Tees, Yorkshire, United Kingdom to Lübeck.

== 6 March ==
List of shipwrecks: 6 March 1890
Ship	State	Description
Malda	United Kingdom	The steamship ran aground at Gravesend, Kent. She was on a voyage from Zanzibar to London. She was refloated and resumed her voyage.
Murton	United Kingdom	The steamship ran aground in the River Ouse at Swinefleet, Yorkshire. She was on a voyage from Goole, Yorkshire to London. She was refloated the next day and resumed her voyage.

== 7 March ==
List of shipwrecks: 7 March 1890
Ship	State	Description
County Antrim	United Kingdom	The steamship struck the quayside at Maryport, Cumberland and was damaged. She was on a voyage from Bilbao, Spain to Maryport.
De Ruyter	Belgium	The steamship was driven ashore at Scituate, Massachusetts, United States. Her 27 crew were rescued. She was later refloated and beached at Boston, Massachusetts.
Emanuel	Sweden	The schooner was driven ashore on Skagen, Denmark. She was on a voyage from Gothenburg to Cardiff, Glamorgan, United Kingdom.
Irene Morris	United Kingdom	The steamship put in to Lisbon, Portugal on fire.
Peter	Germany	The barque was abandoned in the Atlantic Ocean 800 nautical miles (1,500 km) west of the Outer Hebrides, United Kingdom. Her crew were rescued. She was on a voyage from Pensacola, Florida, United States to Huelva, Spain.
Wibbiena Swerdina	United Kingdom	The ketch was driven ashore and wrecked at Bamburgh Castle, Northumberland. Her crew were rescued. She was on a voyage from Coldingham, Berwickshire to Sunderland, County Durham.

== 8 March ==
List of shipwrecks: 8 March 1890
Ship	State	Description
Breeze	United Kingdom	The smack broke from her moorings, collided with the steamship Owain Tudor (United Kingdom) and sank at Barrow-in-Furness, Lancashire. Her crew were rescued.
Fantasy	United Kingdom	The schooner was abandoned 3 nautical miles (5.6 km) off Rosehearty, Aberdeenshire. Her crew survived. She was on a voyage from Middlesbrough, Yorkshire to Invergordon, Ross-shire. She came ashore at Rosehearty and was wrecked.
Heimborg	Germany	The steamship ran aground in the Suez Canal at Ismailia. She was refloated.
Osprey	United Kingdom	The schooner foundered in the River Mersey off Egremont, Lancashire with the loss of all hands.
Rapture	United Kingdom	The fishing boat struck a sunken rock in Loch Eriboll or the Pentland Firth and sank with the loss of seven of her nine crew.
Southgate	United Kingdom	The steamship was driven ashore at Placentia, Newfoundland Colony. She was later refloated and towed in to Halifax, Nova Scotia, Dominion of Canada.
Unnamed	United Kingdom	The wherry sank in the River Tyne.

== 9 March ==
List of shipwrecks: 9 March 1890
Ship	State	Description
Abbey Town	United Kingdom	The barque was driven ashore near Calais, France. Her sixteen crew were rescued by the Calais Lifeboat. She was on a voyage from Pensacola, Florida United States to Dunkerque, Nord, France. She caught fire the next day and was severely damaged. She was refloated on 13 March and taken in to Calais.
Kate	United Kingdom	The ship collided with the Severn Railway Bridge and sank in the River Severn. She was on a voyage from Chepstow, Monmouthshire to Minsterworth, Gloucestershire.
Mary Caroline	United Kingdom	The ship was wrecked on Pladda, Ayrshire. Her crew survived.
Verbena	United Kingdom	The schooner was driven ashore near Eccles-on-Sea, Norfolk. Her crew survived. She was on a voyage from Pentewan, Cornwall to Grangemouth, Stirlingshire. She subsequently became a wreck.
Walter Bibby	United Kingdom	The dredger was driven ashore at Dundalk, County Louth.

== 10 March ==
List of shipwrecks: 10 March 1890
Ship	State	Description
Auskeles	RussiaUnited Kingdom	The barque was run into by the steamship Baron Fife at Lisbon, Portugal and sank.
Burton	United Kingdom	The steamship ran aground on the Pagen Sand, in the Elbe.
Douse, Pylades, and Samarino	United Kingdom; Norway; United Kingdom	The barque Samarino collided with the quayside at South Shields, County Durham, damaging the schooner Pylades and severely damaging the schooner Douse.
Gulf of Aden	United Kingdom	The steamship was abandoned 100 nautical miles (190 km) off the Chiloé Archipelago, Chile. All 81 people on board took to four boats, one of which with 21 people on board reached the archipelago. She was on a voyage from Liverpool, Lancashire to Valparaíso, Chile. Ultimately, there were only nine survivors.
Hildegard	United Kingdom	The steamship caught fire at Buenos Aires, Argentina. the fire was extinguished.
Kilmore	United Kingdom	The steamship ran aground in the Danube 2 nautical miles (3.7 km) downstream of Sulina, Romania.
Portia	United Kingdom	The steamship was driven ashore on Bermuda. She was refloated.
Sofie	Denmark	The schooner ran aground in Kolding Fjord and was severely damaged. She was refloated with assistance from the steamship Pony (Flag unknown) and taken in to Kolding.
Unnamed	United States	The lighter was lost at St. Augustine, Florida.
Unnamed	United States	The lighter was run aground at St. Augustine, Florida.

== 11 March ==
List of shipwrecks: 11 March 1890
Ship	State	Description
Ascania	Germany	The steamship was driven ashore at Callantsoog, North Holland, Netherlands. She was on a voyage from Hamburg to a Chinese port. She was refloated on 17 March. She waws later refloated and towed in to Helsingør, Denmark.
Narcissus	United Kingdom	The ship ran aground at Belfast, County Antrim. She was on a voyage from Maryport, Cumberland to Bahía Blanca, . Brazil. She was refloated the next day and taken in to the Belfast Lough.
Raithwaite Hall	United Kingdom	The steamship sank at Newcastle upon Tyne, Northumberland.

== 12 March ==
List of shipwrecks: 12 March 1890
Ship	State	Description
Agnes	New South Wales	The schooner foundered off the mouth of the Brunswick River.
Eclipse	United Kingdom	The ship foundered in the River Mersey off Egremont, Lancashire with the loss of all three crew. She was on a voyage from Penmaenmawr, Caernarfonshire to Liverpool, Lancashire.
Golden Horn	United Kingdom	The steamship ran aground on Scharhörn, Germany. She was refloated.
Hannibal	Flag unknown	The ship was driven ashore at Key West, Florida, United States.
Home Bay	United Kingdom	The fishing trawler collided with the steamship Grantully (United Kingdom) and sank in the Bristol Channel off Trevose Head, Cornwall with the loss of all six crew.
Soochow	China	The steamship was driven ashore and wrecked at Chimney Point, Hainan Island. She was on a voyage from Hong Kong to Pakhoi.
Tana	Norway	The steamship ran aground at "Vee". She was refloated.

== 13 March ==
List of shipwrecks: 13 March 1890
Ship	State	Description
Cyclop	Germany	The dredger collided with the steamship Stad Lübeck at Lübeck and sank.
Elgiva	United Kingdom	The steamship ran aground in the Orinoco River 80 nautical miles (150 km) downstream of Ciudad Bolívar, Venezuela. She was on a voyage from New York, United States to Ciudad Bolívar.
Propitious	United Kingdom	The steamship was severely damaged by fire at Liverpool, Lancashire.
Sligo	United Kingdom	The steamship arrived at Sligo on fire. She was on a voyage from Liverpool to Sligo.The fire was extinguished.
Thorntondale	United Kingdom	The steamship ran aground at Bahía Blanca, Brazil. She was refloated.
Union	Norway	The barque was driven ashore on Horn Island, Mississippi, United States.
Vesper	United Kingdom	The steamship collided with the steamship Star of England (United Kingdom) in the River Thames and was severely damaged. Vesper was beached on the Mucking Flat. She was on a voyage from Blyth, Northumberland to Greenhithe, Kent.

== 14 March ==
List of shipwrecks: 14 March 1890
Ship	State	Description
Barmston	United Kingdom	The steamship ran aground on the Holm Sand, in the North Sea off the coast of Suffolk. She was on a voyage from Sunderland, County Durham to London. She was refloated the next day with the assistance of a number of tugs and resumed her voyage.
Paula	Germany	The steamship ran aground in the Elbe at Finkenwerder. She was on a voyage from Baltimore, Maryland, United States to Altona. She was refloated and completed her voyage.
West	United Kingdom	The steamship ran aground at Pembrey, Carmarthenshire. She was refloated and resumed her voyage.
Winifred	United Kingdom	The ship put in to Bahía Blanca, Brazil on fire. She was on a voyage from Wellington, New Zealand to London.

== 15 March ==
List of shipwrecks: 15 March 1890
Ship	State	Description
Banchory	United Kingdom	The steamship collided with the steamship Julia Weiner (United Kingdom) in the River Thames downstream of Purfleet, Essex and was beached. Banchory was on a voyage from South Shields, County Durham to London. She was refloated on 18 March and completed her voyage.
Befa	United Kingdom	The Humber keel sank in the River Ouse between Barton Quarry and Chaldernss. Her crew were rescued. She was on a voyage from Stockworth to Hull, Yorkshire.
Franz	Germany	The steamship ran aground on "Amack Island", Denmark. She was refloated with assistance on 18 March and taken in to Copenhagen, Denmark
Greenwich	United Kingdom	The brigantine collided with the dock gates at South Shields, County Durham and was severely damaged.
Hayle	United Kingdom	The steamship ran aground on the Bondicar Rocks, off the coast of Northumberland. She was on a voyage from Sunderland, County Durham to Aberdeen. Her crew were rescued by the Hauxley Lifeboat. She was refloated with the assistance of some fishing boats and resumed her voyage.
Stad Lübeck	Germany	The steamship was driven ashore near Neufahrwassar. She was refloated with assistance from the steamship August (Germany) and taken in to Lübeck.
Ystava	Norway	The barque ran aground in the Elbe. She was on a voyage from Charleston, South Carolina, United States to Hamburg, Germany.

== 16 March ==
List of shipwrecks: 16 March 1890
Ship	State	Description
Assaye	United Kingdom	The ship was sighted at the equator whilst on a voyage from London to Wellington, New Zealand. No further trace, presumed foundered with the loss of all 25 crew.
Bayswater	United Kingdom	The steamship departed from New York, United States for Lisbon, Portugal. No further trace, presumed foundered.
Mary Ann Hood	United Kingdom	The fishing boat collided with the steamship Ottawa (United Kingdom) and sank in the North Sea off Kilnsea, Yorkshire.
Princess Sophia	Greece	The steamship suffered an onboard explosion at Cardiff, Glamorgan, United Kingdom. Two of her crew were severely injured
Young Alfred	United Kingdom	The smack collided with the steamship Dunbrody (United Kingdom) and was severely damaged. Young Alfred put in to Milford Haven, Pembrokeshire.
Young Ellis	United Kingdom	The ketch was run into by a schooner off the Corton Lightship ( Trinity House) and was severely damaged. Her crew were rescued. Young Ellis was on a voyage from Maldon, Essex to Sunderland, County Durham. She was reported to have been taken in tow by a smack and to be in a severely leaky condition.

== 17 March ==
List of shipwrecks: 17 March 1890
Ship	State	Description
Beaver	United Kingdom	The smack ran aground at Ardrossan, Ayrshire. She was refloated.
Bornholm	Denmark	The schooner was driven ashore and wrecked near Malmö, Sweden. Her crew survived.
Eliza	Germany	The brigantine was wrecked at Seacliff, Northumberland, United Kingdom. Her crew were rescued.

== 18 March ==
List of shipwrecks: 18 March 1890
Ship	State	Description
Balders	Norway	The steamship was driven ashore at "Torjet". She was refloated on 20 March and resumed her voyage.
Bon Accord	United Kingdom	The steamship sprang a leak and foundered off Cape Finisterre, Spain. Her 30 crew were rescued by the steamship Anglian (United Kingdom). Bon Accord was on a voyage from Blyth, Northumberland to Malta.
Georgia	(United Kingdom of Great Britain and Ireland) Gibraltar	The hulk was driven ashore and wrecked at Gibraltar.
Lydia Peschau	Germany	The ship was driven ashore at Deepwater Point, North Carolina, United States.
Minnie	Flag unknown	The ship ran aground near Egense, Denmark. She was on a voyage from Falkenburg to Aalborg, Denmar.

== 19 March ==
List of shipwrecks: 19 March 1890
Ship	State	Description
Ascania	Germany	The steamship sank in the Nieuwe Diep.
Coln	German Empire	The steamship was driven ashore in the River Thames at Rosherville, Kent, United Kingdom. She was refloated and resumed her voyage.
Comet	New South Wales	The coaster, a paddle steamer, was wrecked on the Richmond River spit.
Dunedin	United Kingdom	The full-rigged ship departed from Oamaru, New Zealand for London. No further trace, presumed founderedwith the loss of all 35 people on board.
Eschol	United Kingdom	The steamship was abandoned off the north Spanish coast. Her crew were rescued. She was on a voyage from Smyrna, Ottoman Empire to Leith, Lothian. She was towed in to A Coruña the next day in a sinking condition by the steamship Triane (Spain). Eschol was driven ashore and wrecked on 22 March.
Fido	Germany	The ship was lost at St. Domingo, Haiti.
Nithsdale	United Kingdom	The steamship ran aground in the River Thames at Coalhouse Fort, Essex. She was on a voyage from London to Havana, Cuba. She was refloated and resumed her voyage.
Père Guignard	France	The steamship was lost near Alvarado, Mexico. She was on a voyage from Tlacopan, Mexico to Le Havre, Seine-Inférieure.
Volante	United Kingdom	The fishing smack was driven ashore near Thorpeness, Suffolk. Her six crew were rescued by rocket apparatus the next day. She was refloated on 21 March with the assistance of a tug.

== 20 March ==
List of shipwrecks: 20 March 1890
Ship	State	Description
Armonia	Italy	The ship ran aground at Toulon, Var, France. She was on a voyage from Moulmein, Burma to an Italian port.
Bonnie Lad	United Kingdom	The fishing smack was driven ashore at Cleethorpes, Lincolnshire. Her crew were rescued.
Hawarden Castle	United Kingdom	The barque departed from Newcastle, New South Wales for Valparaíso, Chile. No further trace, reported overdue.
H. J. Pallisen	Denmark	The steamship was driven ashore at "Bjerget", near Thisted. She was on a voyage from Libau, Germany to London, United Kingdom. She was later refloated with assistance and taken under tow, but foundered off Løkken.
Llangorse	United Kingdom	The steamship caught fire at Cardiff, Glamorgan. The fire was extinguished.
Relis	Norway	The schooner struck the pier at Charlestown, Cornwall, United Kingdom and was severely damaged.
Rydal Holme	United Kingdom	The steamship collided with the steamship Redruth (United Kingdom) in the North Sea Canal at Buitenhuizen, North Holland, Netherlands and was severely damaged. She was on a voyage from Baltimore, Maryland to IJmuiden, North Holland.
Secret	United Kingdom	The fishing smack was driven ashore and wrecked at "Saint-Jonin", Seine-Inférieure, France. Her crew were rescued.
Theresa	Norway	The barque ran aground in the River Thames. She was on a voyage from Christiania to London. She was refloated and resumed her voyage.
Virent	United Kingdom	The steamship was abandoned when the propeller shaft broke with the loss of nine of her 24 crew. Some of the survivors were landed at Ferrol, Spain. Virent came ashore at Priovino Grande, and was wrecked.
Unnamed	Romania	The lighter was run into by the steamship Helen Otto (United Kingdom) and sank at Ismailia.

== 21 March ==
List of shipwrecks: 21 March 1890
Ship	State	Description
Alvin Kelly	United States	The brig ran aground on the Antonio Reef. She was refloated and taken in to New York.
Black Boy	United Kingdom	The steamship ran aground at the mouth of the River Wear. She was on a voyage from London to Sunderland, County Durham. She was refloated and completed her voyage.
Circassian Prince	United Kingdom	The steamship ran aground on the Haisborough Sands, in the North Sea off the coast of Norfolk. Her 22 crew were rescued by the Palling and Winterton Lifeboats. She was on a voyage from South Shields, County Durham to New York, United States. She was refloated on 25 March with the assistance of four tugs and towed in to Great Yarmouth, Norfolk.
Craigmore	United Kingdom	The steamship ran aground in the Danube. She was later refloated and resumed her voyage.
Eos	Russia	The steamship was driven ashore at Thorhamn, Sweden. She was on a voyage from Libau to Lübeck, Germany.
Ethel Gwendoline	United Kingdom	The collier foundered off Rattray Head, Aberdeenshire with the loss of seven of her ten crew. Survivors were rescued by the steam trawler Prince Consort (United Kingdom). Ethel Gwendoline was on a voyage from Sunderland to Inverness.
Hiawatha	United Kingdom	The lighter ran aground near the mouth of the Sereth.
Lawrench N. Mackenzie	United States	The schooner was driven ashore on the coast of New Jersey.
Marion	Romania	The lighter ran aground near the mouth of the Sereth. She was refloated.
Rita	Spain	The brigantine foundered off Ovar, Portugal.
Thea	Germany	The steamship was driven ashore on Öland, Sweden. She was on a voyage from Riga, Russia to Arbroath, Forfarshire, United Kingdom.
Vivo	United Kingdom	The steamship collided with a barque and was severely damaged. She was taken in to London.
Unnamed	United Kingdom	The barge sank at Leamouth, London.

== 22 March ==
List of shipwrecks: 22 March 1890
Ship	State	Description
Anna	Germany	The barque was wrecked at Little Inagua, Bahamas. Her crew were rescued.
Armonia	Italy	The ship ran aground at Toulon, Var, France. She was on a voyage from Moulmain, Burma to La Seyne-sur-Mer, Var.
Black Prince	United Kingdom	The brig collided with the steamship Larch (United Kingdom) and sank in the North Sea off Whitby, Yorkshire. Her ten crew reached Whitby in a longboat. Black Prince was on a voyage from Hartlepool, County Durham to Portsmouth, Hampshire.
Corral	Chile	The steamship was wrecked at "Tome". All on board were rescued.
Hernosand	Portugal	The barque was wrecked off the Morant Cays, Jamaica. Her nine crew survived. They were rescued on 26 March by the steamship Cuba. (Flag unknown). Hernosand was on a voyage from Port Natal, Cape Colony to Progreso.
Henry Luke	United Kingdom	The schooner was lost in Ramsay Sound. Her crew survived. She was on a voyage from Solva to Fishguard, Pembrokeshire.
Kestrel	United Kingdom	The steamship ran aground in the Elbe at "Osterhorder Stack". She was on a voyage from Hamburg, Germany to Harwich, Essex. She was refloated with the assistance of a tug and resumed her voyage.
Navarino	Victoria	The steamship ran aground on the Satellite Reef. off Port Douglas, Queensland. She was refloated.
Sokol	Russia	The tug was driven ashore near Kertch. She broke in two; the stern section sank.
Tyne	United Kingdom	The steamship was driven ashore at Trouville-sur-Mer, Calvados, France. She was refloated and resumed her voyage.

== 23 March ==
List of shipwrecks: 23 March 1890
Ship	State	Description
Jane Cory	United Kingdom	The steamship ran aground at Exmouth, Devon. She was on a voyage from South Shields, County Durham to Exmouth.
Warkworth	United Kingdom	The steamship caught fire at South Shields.
Wingates	United Kingdom	The steamship departed from Philadelphia, Pennsylvania, United States for Copenhagen, Denmark. No further trace, presumed foundered with the loss of all 30 hands.

== 24 March ==
List of shipwrecks: 24 March 1890
Ship	State	Description
Arethusa	United Kingdom	The steamship was damaged by fire at Hull, Yorkshire.
Blue Bonnet	United Kingdom	The tug sank at South Shields, County Durham.
Cumberland	United Kingdom	The schooner was driven ashore at "Annegasson", County Louth.
Gemma	Germany	The steamship was run into by the steamship Swift (United Kingdom) at Wapping, London, United Kingdom and was damaged.
Glenbervie	United Kingdom	The steamship ran aground at Gibraltar. She was refloated.
Glenhead	United Kingdom	The steam lighter foundered off Campbeltown, Argyllshire. Her crew were rescued. She was on a voyage from Glasgow, Renfrewshire to Campbeltown.
Helmstedt	United Kingdom	The steamship struck a sunken rock and sank off "Mandali Island", Ottoman Empire, Her crew were rescued by the steamship Taormina (Italy). Helmstedt was a total loss.
Jane	United Kingdom	The ship was driven ashore at Kingsgate, Kent. She was on a voyage from South Shields to Jersey, Channel Islands. She was refloated and taken in to Ramsgate, Kent.
Lawada	United Kingdom	The steamship ran aground at Fisherman's Point, in the Hooghly River. She was on a voyage from Calcutta to Bombay, India. She was later refloated.
Prince Llewellyn	United Kingdom	The ship was driven ashore near Beaumaris, Anglesey.
Unnamed	United Kingdom	The lighter sank at South Shields.

== 25 March ==
List of shipwrecks: 25 March 1890
Ship	State	Description
Breeze	United Kingdom	The steamship collided with the steamship Blenheim (United Kingdom) in the River Tees and was beached. Breeze was on a voyage from Bilbao, Spain to the Middlesbrough, Yorkshire.
Crocodile	United Kingdom	The barquentine was driven ashore at Kingsgate, Kent. She was on a voyage from South Shields, County Durham to Guernsey, Channel Islands. She was refloated with the assistance of a tug and taken in to Ramsgate, Kent in a severely leaky condition.
Fiji	United Kingdom	The barque ran aground at Cardiff, Glamorgan. She was on a voyage from Dublin to Cardiff. She was refloated with the assistance of three tugs.
Glenmore	United Kingdom	The steamship ran aground in the River Tees downstream of Eston, Yorkshire.
Hortensia	Denmark	The brigantine was driven ashore at Frederikshavn. She was on a voyage from a Swedish port to Bo'ness, Lothian, United Kingdom. She was refloated.
Long Ditton	United Kingdom	The collier was run into by the steamship Fenella (United Kingdom) and sank in the River Thames at Greenwich, London.
Marie Anna	France	The ship was driven ashore and wrecked in Molasses Bay, Caicos Islands. She was on a voyage from "Port Liberté" to Le Havre, Seine-Inférieure. She was later refloated, and take in to the Turks Islands, where he arrived on 18 April.
Mist	Western Australia	The ship was wrecked in King Sound, Western Australia.
Ruby	New South Wales	The schooner was wrecked in King Sound.

== 26 March ==
List of shipwrecks: 26 March 1890
Ship	State	Description
Emilie	United States	The barque was wrecked at Cape Egmont, New Zealand with the loss of eight of her twelve crew. Survivors were rescued by a tug. She was on a voyage from San Francisco, California to Dunedin, New Zealand.
Hollander	Netherlands	The steamship collided with Royal Sovereign (United Kingdom) off "South Sandhead" and was abandoned by her nineteen crew, being in a sinking condition. They were rescued by the steamship Tudor Price (United Kingdom) when 4 nautical miles (7.4 km) off the Goodwin Sands, Kent, United Kingdom. Hollander was towed in to Dunkerque, Nord, France.
Maria Cristina	Italy	The barque was run into by the steamship Oporto (United Kingdom) at Lisbon, Portugal and was severely damaged. She was beached.

== 27 March ==
List of shipwrecks: 27 March 1890
Ship	State	Description
Briton	United Kingdom	The paddle steamer was run into by William Branfoot (United Kingdom) at Sunderland, County Durham and was damaged.
Reintjedeine	Germany	The schooner was driven ashore and wrecked at Elie, Fife, United Kingdom. She was on a voyage from Brake to Methil, Fife.

== 28 March ==
List of shipwrecks: 28 March 1890
Ship	State	Description
Benamain	United Kingdom	The steamship ran aground on the east coast of Lundy Island, Devon. She was refloated the next day but consequently foundered in the Bristol Channel 7 nautical miles (13 km) off The Mumbles, Glamorgan. Her twelve crew were rescued by the pilot cutter Rival (United Kingdom). Benamain was on a voyage from Swansea to Le Tréport, Seine-Inférieure, France.
Brema	Germany	The barque ran aground at Vegesack. She was on a voyage from Manzanilla, Spain to Bremen.
Bull, and Reindeer	United Kingdom	The ship Bull and the steamship Reindeer collided in the River Tees and were both severely damaged. Bull was on a voyage from Middlesbrough, Yorkshire to Grangemouth, Stirlingshire. Reindeer was on a voyage from Bilbao, Spain to Middlesbrough.
Clydesdale	United Kingdom	The ship struck the North Bishops, off the coast of Cornwall and consequently foundered 5 nautical miles (9.3 km) north of the South Bishops. All 24 people on board survived.
Creadin	United Kingdom	The steamship ran aground at Bristol, Gloucestershire. She was on a voyage from Bristol to Llanelly, Glamorgan.
Dieppois	France	The steamship hit rocks and sank near Land's End, Cornwall. Her eighteen crew landed at Sennen Cove, in their own boat.
Euxine	United Kingdom	The steamship ran aground on the Achbourum Reef, in the Baltic Sea off the Russian coast. She was refloated with the assistance of a tug.
Heinrich Botel	Germany	The barque ran aground at Scharhörn. She was refloated with the assistance of a tug.
Jacob	Germany	The tug sank at the mouth of the Eider Canal.
Marima	United Kingdom	The steamship sprang a leak and sank at La Boca, Argentina.
Mercy	United Kingdom	The barge collided with the steamship Solway Queen (United Kingdom) and sank at Bristol. Mercy was on a voyage from Avonmouth, Somerset to Bristol. She was refloated on 1 April.
Pasteur	Norway	The barque was driven ashore in Carnarvon Bay. Her ten crew were rescued by the Rhosneigr Lifeboat. She was on a voyage from a Mexican port to Liverpool, Lancashire, United Kingdom.
No. 40	French Navy	The torpedo boat was run down and sunk by a steamship in the Charente.
Unnamed	Norway	The barque was driven ashore between Dover and Folkestone, Kent, United Kingdom.

== 29 March ==
List of shipwrecks: 29 March 1890
Ship	State	Description
Alert	United Kingdom	The ship ran aground at "Harburg". She was on a voyage from Demerara, British Guiana to Ghent, West Flanders, Belgium. She was refloated and resumed her voyage.
Clan Maclean	United Kingdom	The steamship struck rocks off "Mantamada", Ceylon. She was beached at Watering Point, near Galle. She was refloated in early April and taken in to Galle, where temporary repairs were made. She sailed for Bombay, India on 17 April.
Ellen	Sweden	The schooner was driven ashore at Dragør, Denmark. She was on a voyage from Helsingborg to Visby, Denmark. She was refloated.
Elsie	United Kingdom	The schooner ran aground at Dunbar, Lothian.
Reentjedina	Germany	The ship departed from Hamburg for Berwick upon Tweed, Northumberland, United Kingdom. No further trace, reported missing.
Sea Prince	United Kingdom	The tug was driven ashore near Bideford, Devon. Her crew were rescued. She was refloated.

== 30 March ==
List of shipwrecks: 30 March 1890
Ship	State	Description
Belmont	United Kingdom	The steamship was driven ashore near Burntisland, Fife. She was on a voyage from Sunderland, County Durham to Copenhagen, Denmark.
Breton	France	The steamship was driven ashore at Cap de la Hague, Manche. All on board were rescued.
Bordeaux	United Kingdom	The steamship struck the Danger Rock, between Dover and Folkestone, Kent. She was on a voyage from London to Gandia, Spain. She was taken in to Dover and beached there. She was refloated on 31 March.
City of Amsterdam	United Kingdom	The steamship ran aground in the River Avon. She was on a voyage from Bristol, Gloucestershire to Swansea, Glamorgan. She was refloated and put back to Bristol.
Littuania	Germany	The steamship was driven ashore near Gilleleje, Denmark and was severely damaged. She was refloated with assistance on 9 April and taken in to Helsingør, Denmark.
Ocean Chief	United Kingdom	The barque was driven ashore at the mouth of the Eider. She was on a voyage from Aruba, Netherlands Antilles to "Frederickstadt". She was refloated and found to be in a leaky condition.
River Clyde	United Kingdom	The ship ran aground in the River Tees. She was refloated.
Tom Pyman	United Kingdom	The steamship was driven ashore on Skagen, Denmark with the loss of seven of her seventeen crew. She was on a voyage from West Hartlepool, County Durham to Flensburg, Germany. She was a total loss.

== 31 March ==
List of shipwrecks: 31 March 1890
Ship	State	Description
Goval	United Kingdom	The steamship was run into by a hopper barge and sank in the River Mersey. Her crew were rescued by the hopper barge. She was on a voyage from Saint-Valery-sur-Somme, Somme, France to the River Mersey. The bow section was refloated on 14 April and beached at Tranmere, Lancashire.
Peter	Germany	The schooner was driven ashore in the Kalmar Sound.
Prima	Flag unknown	The steamship was driven ashore near Malmö, Sweden. She was on a voyage from Bo'ness, Lothian, United Kingdom to Ystad, Sweden. She was refloated with the assistance of a tug.

== Unknown date ==
List of shipwrecks: Unknown date in March 1890
Ship	State	Description
Ailsa	United Kingdom	The barque ran aground at Kingston, Jamaica. She was later refloated and taken in to Kingston in a severely leaky condition.
Alvin Kelly	United Kingdom	The brig ran aground on the Antonio Reef. She was refloated and completed her voyage to New York, United States.
Baron Clyde	United Kingdom	The steamship ran aground on the Zafarana Reef, in the Red Sea. She was later refloated and taken in to Suez, Egypt.
Bloomfield	United States	The schooner was wrecked 20 nautical miles (37 km) east of Maize Point, Cuba. Her crew were rescued. She was on a voyage from Manzanillo, Cuba to New York.
Bridgewater	United States	The full-rigged ship foundered in the Irish Sea. She was on a voyage from Darien to Queenstown, County Cork, United Kingdom. Wreckage from the ship washed up on the coast of County Clare in late March.
Castellano	Spain	The steamship caught fire at New Orleans, Louisiana, United States.
Chongar	United Kingdom	The steamship was driven ashore at Gallipoli, Ottoman Empire. She was refloated with assistance.
Corinna	United Kingdom	The steamship was driven ashore at Bellambi, New South Wales. She was refloated and towed in to Sydney, New South Wales in a leaky condition. She was placed under repair.
Eaton Hall	United Kingdom	The steamship collided with HMS Rupert (Royal Navy) in the River Humber.
Elizabeth	Germany	The steamship ran aground near Pillau. She was on a voyage from Königsberg to Pillau. She was refloated on 31 March and completed her voyage.
Fleur de Lis	United Kingdom	The ship was driven ashore at Bahía Blanca, Brazil. She was on a voyage from Swansea, Glamorgan to Bahía Blanca.
Florence Richards	United Kingdom	The steamship struck a submerged object and foundered 6 to 7 nautical miles (11 to 13 km) off Cabo da Roca, Portugal with the loss of a crew member. She was on a voyage from Arzew, Algeria to Rouen, Seine-Inférieure, France.
Framat	Sweden	The barque was driven ashore and wrecked on Saint Lucia.
Geraldine	Flag unknown	The schooner ran aground on the Wittsand, in the North Sea off Scharhörn, Germany. She was on a voyage from Trinidad to Bremen, Germany. She was refloated on 14 March with assistance.
Giovanni	Italy	The barque was lost off Rio de Janeiro, Brazil before 8 March. Her crew survived. She was on a voyage from Buenos Aires, Argentina to the English Channel.
Glendon	United States	The ship was driven ashore at Sagama, Japan. Her crew were rescued. She was refloated and towed in to Yokosuka, Japan.
Hannibal	Flag unknown	The ship was driven ashore at Key West, Florida, United States. She was on a voyage from Pensacola, Florida to Dordrecht, South Holland, Netherlands. She was refloated with assistance. She was subsequently driven ashore again, but was later refloated.
Harold	United Kingdom	The steamship struck a rock and sank in the Turks Islands. Her crew were rescued. She was on a voyage from Glasgow, Renfrewshire to Jamaica.
Hidalgo	United Kingdom	The steamship caught fire at Reval, Russia. The fire was extinguished.
Hipparchus	Belgium	The steamship was driven ashore on Bermuda. She was refloated.
James Mason	Norway	The brig was wrecked on the Jardanillos, in the Gulf of Florida. Her crew were rescued. She was on a voyage from Jamaica to London, United Kingdom.
Johanna	Germany	The kuff was driven ashore and wrecked on Düne. Her crew were rescued. She was on a voyage from Charlestown, Cornwall, United Kingdom to Tönning.
Kathleen	Flag unknown	The steamship ran aground in the Elbe at Finkenwerder, Germany. She was refloated on 5 March and taken in to Hamburg, Germany.
La Champagne	France	The steamship ran aground in the North River at New York. She was refloated with assistance.
Lizzie	(Dominion of Newfoundland) Newfoundland Colony	The sealer, a schooner, was lost off the coast of Newfoundland.
Lizzie D. Small	United States	The schooner, with a cargo of timber, caught fire and was abandoned. Her captain and six crew were rescued by the fishing schooner Grace Choate (Flag unknown) 15 nautical miles (28 km) southeast of Thatcher Island, Massachusetts, United States and landed them at Gloucester, Massachusetts on 9 March.
L. Staples	United States	The brig was lost.
Myrtle	Dominion of Canada	The brig was wrecked on the coast of Puerto Rico.
Olive Branch	United Kingdom	The steamship ran aground at Maassluis, South Holland, Netherlands. She was on a voyage from Odessa, Russia to Rotterdam, South Holland. She was later refloated.
Primate	United Kingdom	The steamship ran aground on the Hinder Ribben, off the coast of Zeeland, Netherlands. She was on a voyage from Middlesbrough, Yorkshire to Rotterdam, South Holland, Netherlands.
Progress	Norway	The barque was abandoned at sea. Her crew were rescued by the barque Truro (United Kingdom). Progress was subsequently discovered by the steamship Caledonia (United Kingdom) and set afire.
Redruth	United Kingdom	The steamship collided with Rydal Hall (United Kingdom) at Amsterdam, North Holland, Netherlands before 25 March and was severely damaged at the bows. Redruth was on a voyage from Amsterdam to Cardiff, Glamorgan. She completed her voyage.
Risa	Spain	The brigantine was abandoed off the Portuguese coast. She was subsequently taken in tow, but foundered off Porto.
Ross	Norway	The barque was wrecked at Laguna de Términos. She was on a voyage from Port Natal, Cape Colony to Laguna de Términos.
Ruby	Western Australia	The schooner was wrecked in Cascade Bay, Norfolk Island. Her crew survived.
Sultana	United Kingdom	The steamship ran aground near Syra, Greece. She was later refloated.
Svanen	Norway	The barque was driven ashore and wrecked near Fernandina Beach, Florida, United States before 10 March.
Teviot	United Kingdom	The steamship ran aground on Marmara Island, Ottoman Empire. She was refloated and taken in to Constantinople, Ottoman Empire.
Unicorn	United Kingdom	The ship ran aground in the River Plate. She was refloated and towed in to La Boca, Argentina.
Ville de Metz	United Kingdom	The steamship ran aground near Pauillac, Gironde. She was refloated.
Western Chief	Germany	The barque was abandoned off the Bahamas. Her crew were rescued. She was on a voyage from Hamburg to New York.
Winnifred	United Kingdom	The barque sank. She was refloated on 18 March and towed in to Cardiff, Glamorgan, United Kingdom.
