= List of shipwrecks in July 1865 =

The list of shipwrecks in July 1865 includes ships sunk, foundered, grounded, or otherwise lost during July 1865.

== 1 July ==
List of shipwrecks: 1 July 1865
| Ship | State | Description |
|---|---|---|
| Adolphus | United Kingdom | The barque was driven ashore in the Rio Grande. |

== 2 July ==
List of shipwrecks: 2 July 1865
| Ship | State | Description |
|---|---|---|
| Adolphe | France | The barque was driven ashore in the Rio Grande. |
| Alida | Netherlands | The schooner was driven ashore in the Rio Grande. She was refloated the next day. |
| Espoir | Belgium | The brigantine was driven ashore in the Rio Grande. She was refloated on 9 July. |
| Morue | France | The lugger was driven ashore in the Rio Grande. She was refloated the next day. |

== 3 July ==
List of shipwrecks: 3 July 1865
| Ship | State | Description |
|---|---|---|
| O.K. | United States | Carrying a cargo of wood, the 48- or 75-ton sidewheel paddle steamer burned on the Yolo County side of the Sacramento River across from M Street in Sacramento, California. She was later salvaged and returned to service. |
| Oxford | Norway | The barque was driven ashore on Dagö, Russia. She was on a voyage from Söderhamn, Sweden to London, United Kingdom. She was later refloated and taken in to Helsingør, Denmark in a leaky condition. |

== 4 July ==
List of shipwrecks: 4 July 1865
| Ship | State | Description |
|---|---|---|
| Agnes | Flag unknown | The cutter was wrecked on the coast of New South Wales. |
| Star of the West | United Kingdom | The ship was driven ashore on Long Island, British North America. She was on a voyage from Saint John, New Brunswick to Dundalk, County Louth. She was refloated and resumed her voyage. |

== 5 July ==
List of shipwrecks: 5 July 1865
| Ship | State | Description |
|---|---|---|
| Essex | United Kingdom | The full-rigged ship was abandoned in the Atlantic Ocean. Her crew were rescued by the full-rigged ship Constantia (Bremen). Essex was on a voyage from New York, United States to Queenstown, County Cork. |

== 8 July ==
List of shipwrecks: 8 July 1865
| Ship | State | Description |
|---|---|---|
| Mars | United States | The 329-ton sidewheel paddle steamer struck a snag and sank in the Mississippi River at Cogswell Island, Missouri, opposite the mouth of the Fishing River. |

== 9 July ==
List of shipwrecks: 9 July 1865
| Ship | State | Description |
|---|---|---|
| Louisiana | United States | American Civil War: While fleeing from the merchant raider CSS Shenandoah (Confederate States Navy), the 297-ton whaling ship was wrecked on a shoal in Kotzebue Sound off the coast of Russian America between the southern tip of Choris Peninsula and Chamisso Island. Her crew salvaged her cargo of whale oil and burned her on 13 July. Her wreck could be seen on shore until 1875. |

== 11 July ==
List of shipwrecks: 11 July 1865
| Ship | State | Description |
|---|---|---|
| Flying Fish | (United Kingdom of Great Britain and Ireland) Barbados | The ship collided with Clara (Flag unknown) and sank off Saint Thomas, Virgin Islands. Her crew were rescued. |
| Natal | (United Kingdom of Great Britain and Ireland) New South Wales | The barque was wrecked in Sealer's Cove, in the Bass Strait. Her crew were rescued. She was on a voyage from Newcastle to Wallaroo, South Australia |
| Tomatin | United Kingdom | The barque was wrecked in Sealer's Cove. Her crew were rescued. She was on a voyage from Newcastle to Geelong, Victoria. |

== 13 July ==
List of shipwrecks: 13 July 1865
| Ship | State | Description |
|---|---|---|
| HMS Eclipse | Royal Navy | The Cormorant-class gunvessel was driven ashore on the coast of Australia. Subsequently refloated, repaired and returned to service. |
| Fohkien | United States | The 1,947-ton sidewheel paddle steamer was stranded on the coast of Korea 60 nautical miles (110 km) from Chinhae. |
| Impératrice | France | The tug was destroyed by a boiler explosion in the Seine at La Mailleraye-sur-Seine, Seine-Inférieure with the loss of five of the thirteen people on board. Survivors were rescued by the steamship Express No.2 (France. |
| Union | (United Kingdom of Great Britain and Ireland) New Zealand | The 14-ton cutter was wrecked on a reef in the Hauraki Gulf while en route from Auckland to Matakana. All hands were saved. |
| Zeemeuw | Hamburg | The ship was driven ashore at Gibraltar. She was on a voyage from Terranova di Sicilia, Sicily, Italy to Hamburg. She was refloated and resumed her voyage. |

== 14 July ==
List of shipwrecks: 14 July 1865
| Ship | State | Description |
|---|---|---|
| Charles Chaloner | United Kingdom | The ship was driven ashore at Fleetwood, Lancashire. She was on a voyage from Quebec City. Province of Canada, British North America to Fleetwood. She was refloated and towed in to Fleetwood. |
| Lady Young | (United Kingdom of Great Britain and Ireland) New South Wales | The full-rigged ship was wrecked in Sealer's Cove, in the Bass Strait. Her crew were rescued. She was on a voyage form Newcastle to Melbourne, Victoria. |
| Wyaconda | United States | The 239-ton sidewheel paddle steamer burned on the Mississippi River at St. Genevieve, Missouri, with the loss of one life. |

== 16 July ==
List of shipwrecks: 16 July 1865
| Ship | State | Description |
|---|---|---|
| Arthur and Albert | United Kingdom | The lugger collided with the schooner Agenoria (United Kingdom) and foundered in the North Sea off Gorleston, Suffolk. Her crew were rescued by Agenoria. |
| Dennis Hill | United Kingdom | The ship was driven ashore and wrecked at Capo Colonna, Italy. |
| Fannie Fisk | United States | The 97-ton sidewheel paddle steamer burned at Cairo, Illinois. |
| Ingeborg | Hamburg | The ship suffered an onboard explosion and foundered in the Dogger Bank. Her crew were rescued. She was on a voyage from Hartlepool, County Durham, United Kingdom to Hamburg. |
| Steliano | Greece | The ship foundered off Şile, Ottoman Empire. Her crew were rescued. |

== 17 July ==
List of shipwrecks: 17 July 1865
| Ship | State | Description |
|---|---|---|
| Ada | United Kingdom | The barque was run into by the steamship Jeddo (United Kingdom) and sank at Sydney, New South Wales. Her crew survived. She was on a voyage from Sydney to Shanghai, China. |
| Mary B. Rich | United States | The barque was abandoned in the Atlantic Ocean 900 nautical miles (1,700 km) west of Cape Clear Island, County Cork, United Kingdom. Her crew were rescued by Lady Dufferin (United Kingdom). Mary B. Rich was on a voyage from Matanzas, Cuba to Falmouth, Cornwall, United Kingdom. |
| Sarah Ann | (United Kingdom of Great Britain and Ireland) South Australia | The schooner was driven ashore on Rabbit Island, Tasmania. |

== 18 July ==
List of shipwrecks: 18 July 1865
| Ship | State | Description |
|---|---|---|
| Tre Svetiteli | Russia | The lighter sank off Taganrog. |

== 19 July ==
List of shipwrecks: 19 July 1865
| Ship | State | Description |
|---|---|---|
| John C. Baxter | United States | The schooner was sunk in a collision near the east end of Horseshoe Shoal. |
| Phantom | United Kingdom | The ship was wrecked near Cape Nordkyn, Norway. Her crew were rescued. |
| Titania | (United Kingdom of Great Britain and Ireland) New Zealand | The 54-ton steamer was wrecked on the bar at Hokitika, where she had arrived from Nelson. All passengers and crew survived. |

== 20 July ==
List of shipwrecks: 20 July 1865
| Ship | State | Description |
|---|---|---|
| Pisataqua | United States | The full-rigged ship was driven ashore and wrecked at Green Point, Cape Town, Cape Colony. She was on a voyage from Cardiff, Glamorgan, United Kingdom to Basilan, Spanish East Indies. |
| Quinnebaug | United States Army | Carrying Union Army soldiers home from Beaufort, North Carolina, the 186-ton screw transport was wrecked on a reef off Shackleford Banks, North Carolina, with the loss of 25 lives. The tug Goliath ( United States Army), the full-rigged ship Benjamin Adams (Flag unknown), and the survey ship USCS Corwin ( United States Coast Survey) rescued her survivors. |
| Swan | United States | The schooner was lost near Madison Point, Connecticut. Crew saved. |

== 21 July ==
List of shipwrecks: 21 July 1865
| Ship | State | Description |
|---|---|---|
| Admiral Codrington | United Kingdom | The ship was driven ashore at Caister-on-Sea, Norfolk. She was refloated and resumed her voyage. |
| Hankow | United States | The 725-ton sidewheel paddle steamer burned at Canton, China. |
| Kate | (United Kingdom of Great Britain and Ireland) New Zealand | The cutter was seized, plundered, and burnt, by a Māori raiding party at Whakatāne, with the loss of three lives. |
| Marinuru or Maruwiwi | (United Kingdom of Great Britain and Ireland) New Zealand | The schooner was seized, plundered, and burnt, by a Māori raiding party at Whakatāne, with the loss of one life. |

== 22 July ==
List of shipwrecks: 22 July 1865
| Ship | State | Description |
|---|---|---|
| Neptune | United Kingdom | The brig ran aground off Amager, Denmark. She was on a voyage from Riga, Russia to Dundee, Forfarshire. |
| Ripple | United Kingdom | The ship collided with Mary E. Campbell (United Kingdom) and sank in the North Sea. Her crew were rescued. |
| Samuel B. Young | United States | The 154-ton sternwheel paddle steamer was lost. |

== 24 July ==
List of shipwrecks: 24 July 1865
| Ship | State | Description |
|---|---|---|
| Effort | (United Kingdom of Great Britain and Ireland) New Zealand | The schooner was wrecked at Awanui during a violent gale. |
| Onward | (United Kingdom of Great Britain and Ireland) New Zealand | The schooner was wrecked on an island near Pauanui on Coromandel Peninsula. The two crew were marooned for four days before being rescued by the schooner Jane ( (United Kingdom of Great Britain and Ireland) New Zealand). |

== 26 July ==
List of shipwrecks: 26 July 1865
| Ship | State | Description |
|---|---|---|
| Gereon | Sweden | The schooner capsized in the Baltic Sea with the loss of two of the six people on board. She was towed in to Warnemünde, Prussia in a capsized condition. |
| Rosetta | United Kingdom | The ship was wrecked on the north coast of Prince Edward Island, British North America. |

== 28 July ==
List of shipwrecks: 28 July 1865
| Ship | State | Description |
|---|---|---|
| Port Wallace | United Kingdom | The ship ran aground off Helsingør, Denmark. She was on a voyage from Gävle, Sweden to Hartlepool, County Durham. She was refloated and towed in to Helsingør. |

== 29 July ==
List of shipwrecks: 29 July 1865
| Ship | State | Description |
|---|---|---|
| Ida | United Kingdom | The barque collided with the barque Wasa ( (Russian Empire) Grand Duchy of Finland) and sank off Bozcaada, Ottoman Empire. |
| Mary Traill | United Kingdom | The ship ran aground off Egilsay, Orkney Islands. She was on a voyage from the River Clyde to Kirkwall, Orkney Islands. She was refloated. |
| Planet | Norway | The barque collided with the steamship Aura (United Kingdom) and sank off the Nore. |

== 30 July ==
List of shipwrecks: 30 July 1865
| Ship | State | Description |
|---|---|---|
| Ann and Jane | United Kingdom | The ship was beached at Lisbon, Portugal, being severely leaky. She was on a voyage from Pomaron, Portugal to Newcastle upon Tyne, Northumberland. |
| Brother Jonathan | United States | The California Steam Navigation Company paddle steamer struck North West Seal Rock, a part of St. George's Reef in the Pacific Ocean off Crescent City, California, and sank. An estimated 225 passengers and crew lost their lives; there were only nineteen survivors. She was on a voyage from San Francisco, California to Portland, Maine. |
| Francis Bourneuf | (United Kingdom of Great Britain and Ireland) British North America | The ship ran aground at Rutland, County Donegal. She was on a voyage from Yarmouth, Nova Scotia to the Clyde. |

== 31 July ==
List of shipwrecks: 31 July 1865
| Ship | State | Description |
|---|---|---|
| Edwin | United States | The lumber schooner sank about ten miles North East of the Isle of Shoals. Crew saved. |
| Glasgow | United Kingdom | The full-rigged ship caught fire and was abandoned in the North Atlantic Ocean off Nantucket Island, Massachusetts, United States. Her crew were rescued by the full-rigged ship Rosamond (United States). Glasgow was on a voyage from New York, United States to Liverpool, Lancashire. She was taken in tow by the brig Martha Washington (United States the next day. |
| Joseph Pierce | United States | The 533-ton sidewheel paddle steamer exploded on the Mississippi River at Palmyra Landing, Mississippi, killing twelve people. |
| Rose | United Kingdom | The ship departed from Montrose, Forfarshire for Shanghai, China. No further trace, presumed either foundered with the loss of all twenty crew or captured by Chinese pirates. |
| Rosetta | (United Kingdom of Great Britain and Ireland) New Zealand | The 47-ton schooner grounded on a sandspit at Hokitika. All passengers and crew survived. |

== Unknown date ==
List of shipwrecks: Unknown date in July 1865
| Ship | State | Description |
|---|---|---|
| Annechina en Jantina | Netherlands | The ship was driven ashore near Kronstadt, Russia. She was on a voyage from Bo'ness, Lothian, United Kingdom to Kronstadt. |
| Bella Donna | United States | The 152-ton sidewheel paddle steamer struck a snag and sank in the Red River of the South 50 nautical miles (93 km) downstream of Alexandria, Louisiana. |
| Chase | United Kingdom | The ship sank off Seskar, Russia. |
| Dankbarheid | Flag unknown | The ship was driven ashore near Kronstadt. She was on a voyage from Bordeaux, Gironde, France to Kronstadt. |
| Exchange | United Kingdom | The ship was driven ashore at Grimsby, Lincolnshire. She was on a voyage from Middlesbrough, Yorkshire to Caen, Calvados, France. |
| Futien | Flag unknown | The ship was wrecked at Shanghai, China on or before 22 July. |
| Hadrakon | United Kingdom | The steamship was destroyed by fire at Shanghai on or before 22 July. |
| La Belle | United Kingdom | The fishing smack foundered west of the Shetland Islands with the loss of all six crew. |
| Lady of the Lake | United Kingdom | The ship was wrecked near Cape San Antonio, Cuba. She was on a voyage from Havana to Manzanilla, Cuba. |
| Lalla Rookh | India | The steamship was wrecked at Shanghai on or before 22 July. |
| Louisa | United Kingdom | The barque caught fire and sank near Algiers, Algeria. |
| Maalstrom | Norway | The brig was lost in the White Sea before 12 July. |
| Mary Emily | United States | The ship foundered 75 nautical miles (139 km) off the Abaco Islands. Her crew were rescued. She was on a voyage from Nassau, Bahamas to New York. |
| Messenger | (United Kingdom of Great Britain and Ireland) British North America | The brig was wrecked on Phillips Court. |
| New Zealand | (United Kingdom of Great Britain and Ireland) New Zealand | The 374-ton paddle steamer damaged her keel when crossing the bar at Hokitika, where she had travelled from Lyttelton. She became uncontrollable, and grounded on a nearby beach. All passengers and crew survived. |
| Prince of Wales | United Kingdom | The ship foundered off Gogo, India. She was refloated in November and taken in to Bombay. |
| Rigi | France | The barque was wrecked on "Cape Gotto", Japan. |
| Star | United States | The 94-ton sternwheel paddle steamer burned on Red Bayou in Louisiana. |
| Susan Abigal | Flag unknown | The full-rigged ship was lost off Cape Flattery, Washington Territory. |
| Tonkeen | Flag unknown | The steamship was wrecked off China, probably in the same typhoon as the Lalla Rookh, above (reported September). |
| Unicorn | United Kingdom | The ship was wrecked near Stornoway, Isle of Lewis, Outer Hebrides. She was on a voyage from Demerara, British Guiana to Sunderland, County Durham. |
| Volunteer | United States | The 106-ton sternwheel paddle steamer was stranded on the Cumberland River in Tennessee. |
