= List of shipwrecks in July 1860 =

The list of shipwrecks in July 1860 includes ships sunk, foundered, grounded, or otherwise lost during July 1860.

== 1 July ==
List of shipwrecks: 1 July 1860
Ship	State	Description
Azola	United Kingdom	The brig was driven ashore 2 nautical miles (3.7 km) east of Gibraltar. She was on a voyage from Galaţi, Ottoman Empire to Newcastle upon Tyne, Northumberland. She was refloated with assistance from HMS Redpole (Royal Navy) and resumed her voyage.
Egbert	Netherlands	The full-rigged ship was beached at Singapore, Straits Settlements having sprang a leak on 29 June. She was on a voyage from Batavia, Netherlands East Indies to Singapore.
Tyneside	United Kingdom	The brig ran aground on the Gunfleet Sand, in the North Sea off the coast of Essex. She was on a voyage from South Shields, County Durham to London. She was refloated with assistance from the smacks Beulah, Good Agreement and Scout (all United Kingdom and resumed her voyage.

== 2 July ==
List of shipwrecks: 2 July 1860
Ship	State	Description
Gertrude	United Kingdom	The steamship ran aground on the Holm Sand, in the North Sea off the coast of Suffolk. She was refloated and resumed her voyage.
Gipsey	United Kingdom	The brig was driven onto rocks at Ventnor, Isle of Wight. She was on a voyage from Sunderland, County Durham to Bordeaux, Gironde, France. She was refloated the next day and taken in to Portsmouth, Hampshire in a severely leaky condition.
Sarah Charlotte	United Kingdom	The brig was driven ashore and wrecked in Table Bay. Her nine crew survived.
Sir Henry Pottinger	United Kingdom	The barque was driven ashore and wrecked in Table Bay. Her sixteen crew survived. She was on a voyage from Aden to the Waux River.

== 3 July ==
List of shipwrecks: 3 July 1860
Ship	State	Description
Adela	United States	The ship was destroyed by fire off the east coast of Cuba. Her twelve crew survived. She was on a voyage from Montevideo, Uruguay to New Orleans, Louisiana.
Carrickfergus	United Kingdom	The brig was wrecked near Cape Vilan, Spain. Her eight crew were rescued. She was on a voyage from Antwerp, Belgium to Buenos Aires, Argentina.
Margarita	(United Kingdom of Great Britain and Ireland) New Zealand	The brigantine was found to be on fire and after several hours fighting the flames was scuttled in Wellington Harbour. Her eleven crew survived.
Telegraph	United Kingdom	The ship struck the pier at Birkenhead, Cheshire and was damaged. She was on a voyage from Liverpool, Lancashire to Sydney, New South Wales.

== 4 July ==
List of shipwrecks: 4 July 1860
Ship	State	Description
Dalton	United Kingdom	The schooner sprang a leak and sank in the Cattewater. She was on a voyage from Plymouth, Devon to Newcastle upon Tyne, Northumberland.
Mine	France	The schooner was lost off Hellevoetsluis, Zeeland, Netherlands. Her crew were rescued.
Narrangansett	United States	The ship ran aground on the Pampus, off the coast of Zeeland.
Pelican	United Kingdom	The steamship ran aground on the Goodwin Sands, Kent. She was on a voyage from Dunkirk, Nord, France to Liverpool, Lancashire. She was refloated and resumed her voyage.

== 6 July ==
List of shipwrecks: 6 July 1860
Ship	State	Description
Juliet Erskine	United Kingdom	The barque ran aground in the Gaspar Strait and was wrecked. Her eleven crew were rescued by Mona (United Kingdom). Juliet Erskine was on a voyage from Singapore, Straits Settlements to Mauritius.

== 7 July ==
List of shipwrecks: 7 July 1860
Ship	State	Description
True Blue	United Kingdom	The schooner foundered off Trevose Head, Cornwall. Her crew survived. She was on a voyage from Teignmouth, Devon to Chester, Cheshire.

== 8 July ==
List of shipwrecks: 8 July 1860
Ship	State	Description
Alice and Ann	United Kingdom	The schooner sank off the Point of Ayr, Cheshire.

== 9 July ==
List of shipwrecks: 9 July 1860
Ship	State	Description
Black Diamond	United Kingdom	The steamship ran aground at Sunderland, County Durham. She was on a voyage from Sunderland to London. She was refloated and resumed her voyage.
Hetton	United Kingdom	The steamship ran aground at Sunderland. She was on a voyage from Sunderland to London. She was refloated and resumed her voyage.
Saracen	(United Kingdom of Great Britain and Ireland) Victoria	The schooner was wrecked at Gippsland.
Swift	(United Kingdom of Great Britain and Ireland) New South Wales	The ketch foundered off the Long Reef. She was on a voyage from Sydney to Brisbane, Queensland.

== 10 July ==
List of shipwrecks: 10 July 1860
Ship	State	Description
Speculation	United Kingdom	The barque ran aground at Sunderland, County Durham. She was on a voyage from Wisbech, Cambridgeshire to Sunderland. She was refloated.

== 11 July ==
List of shipwrecks: 11 July 1860
Ship	State	Description
Gratitude	United Kingdom	The schooner foundered 20 nautical miles (37 km) off Vigo, Spain. Her five crew survived. She was on a voyage from Swansea, Glamorgan to Seville, Spain.

== 12 July ==
List of shipwrecks: 12 July 1860
Ship	State	Description
Elizabeth Young	United Kingdom	The ship ran aground on the Droogden, in the Baltic Sea. She was refloated.
General Berry	United States	The ship was driven ashore on Rathlin Island, County Antrim, United Kingdom. Her crew survive. She was on a voyage from Ardrossan, Ayrshire, United Kingdom to Boston, Massachusetts.
Phantom	(United Kingdom of Great Britain and Ireland) New South Wales	The brig was wrecked at Newcastle.
Scotia	United Kingdom	The ship put in to Saint Helena in a leaky condition. She was deemed to be beyond repair.

== 13 July ==
List of shipwrecks: 13 July 1860
Ship	State	Description
Agnes	(United Kingdom of Great Britain and Ireland) New South Wales	The ship was driven ashore and wrecked at Newcastle. She was on a voyage from Newcastle to Sydney.
Joshua Waddington	United Kingdom	The barque was wrecked on a reef in the Carimata Strait. Her seventeen crew were rescued by Ocean Mail (United Kingdom). Joshua Waddington was on a voyage from Singapore, Straits Settlements to London.

== 14 July ==
List of shipwrecks: 14 July 1860
Ship	State	Description
Amejos	Chile	The ship ran aground at Cardiff, Glamorgan, United Kingdom. She was on a voyage from Cardiff to Barcelona, Spain.
Osvetitel	Austrian Empire	The barque was wrecked in fog on the Maiden Bower Rock in the Isles of Scilly, United Kingdom. Her crew were rescued and most of her cargo of barley was recovered. She was on a voyage from Brăila, United Principalities, to Falmouth, Cornwall, United Kingdom.

== 15 July ==
List of shipwrecks: 15 July 1860
Ship	State	Description
Georges et Emilie	France	The schooner ran aground on the Holm Sand, in the North Sea off the coast of Suffolk, United Kingdom.
Star	United Kingdom	The yacht struck a sunken rock and sank at Saint-Malo, Ille-et-Vilaine, France. All on board survived. She was later refloated, found to be waterlogged and was beached at Saint-Père, Ille-et-Vilaine.

== 16 July ==
List of shipwrecks: 16 July 1860
Ship	State	Description
John Bowes	United Kingdom	The steamship ran aground on the Insand, in the North Sea off the coast of County Durham. She was reported to be on a voyage from Rosedale, Yorkshire to the River Tyne.

== 17 July ==
List of shipwrecks: 17 July 1860
Ship	State	Description
Constellation	United Kingdom	The ship ran aground at Saint John, New Brunswick, British North America. She was on a voyage from Saint John to Liverpool, Lancashire. She was refloated and resumed her voyage.
Envoy	United Kingdom	The barque was driven ashore at Cape English, Newfoundland, British North America. She was on a voyage from Miramichi, New Brunswick to the Clyde. She was refloated and taken in to St. Mary's, Newfoundland in a waterlogged condition.
Eugenie	United Kingdom	The brig ran aground at Westport, Nova Scotia, British North America. She was on a voyage from Saint John, New Brunswick to Cork. She was consequently condemned.

== 18 July ==
List of shipwrecks: 18 July 1860
Ship	State	Description
Venus	Denmark	The brigantine was wrecked on the Anegada Shoals, in the Bahamas. She was on a voyage from Fleetwood, Lancashire, United Kingdom to Cap-Haïtien, Haiti.

== 19 July ==
List of shipwrecks: 19 July 1860
Ship	State	Description
Orpheus	United Kingdom	The barque was driven ashore near Belize City, British Honduras. Her twelve crew survived. She was on a voyage from Fernando Po, Equatorial Guinea to Belize City.
Typhoon	United Kingdom	The full-rigged ship was abandoned in the Indian Ocean. Her twenty crew survived. She was on a voyage from Akyab, Burma to Falmouth, Cornwall.

== 20 July ==
List of shipwrecks: 20 July 1860
Ship	State	Description
Jovellanos	Spain	The steamship was wrecked near Vigo. She was on a voyage from Barcelona to London, United Kingdom.
Snake	United Kingdom	The schooner was discovered derelict in the Indian Ocean by Julia Reed (United Kingdom) and Maria Charlotte (Sweden).
Torino	Kingdom of Sardinia	Second Italian War of Independence: Expedition of the Thousand: The steamship ran aground near Reggio Calabria, Kingdom of the Two Sicilies. She was subsequently destroyed by the frigates Fulminante and Palermo (both Royal Sicilian Navy).

== 22 July ==
List of shipwrecks: 22 July 1860
Ship	State	Description
Imaum of Muscat	United Kingdom	The barque was wrecked at Anse à Pierre, Newfoundland, British North America. Her twelve crew survived. She was on a voyage from Cardiff, Glamorgan to Quebec City, Province of Canada, British North America.

== 23 July ==
List of shipwrecks: 23 July 1860
Ship	State	Description
Jenny Lind	United Kingdom	The schooner collided with another vessel and sank in the Elbe with the loss of one of her four crew. She was on a voyage from Liverpool, Lancashire to Elmshorn, Duchy of Schleswig.

== 24 July ==
List of shipwrecks: 24 July 1860
Ship	State	Description
Sarah and Eleanor	United Kingdom	The ship ran aground on the Haisborough Sands, in the North Sea off the coast of Norfolk. She was on a voyage from Viborg, Denmark to London. She was refloated and taken in to Lowestoft, Suffolk in a leaky condition.

== 25 July ==
List of shipwrecks: 25 July 1860
Ship	State	Description
A. D. Gamage	United Kingdom	The brigantine was wrecked at Mayaguana, Cuba. She was on a voyage from Aux Cayes, Haiti to New York, United States.
Sisters	(United Kingdom of Great Britain and Ireland) New South Wales	The schooner was wrecked at North Head. She was on a voyage from Newcastle to Sydney.

== 26 July ==
List of shipwrecks: 26 July 1860
Ship	State	Description
Adelaide	United Kingdom	The schooner collided with the steamship Cambria (United Kingdom and sank in the Irish Sea off Walney Island, Lancashire with the loss of her captain. She was on a voyage from Barrow in Furness, Lancashire to Llanelly, Glamorgan.
Josephine	Norway	The brig collided with the steamship Baltic (Russia) and was beached at Riga, Russia.
Oliver Putnam	United States	The full-rigged ship was abandoned in the Indian Ocean. Her crew took to three boats; ten of them in one boat were rescued by Koningen Vaderland (Netherlands). Oliver Putnam was on a voyage from Liverpool, Lancashire to Calcutta, India.

== 27 July ==
List of shipwrecks: 27 July 1860
Ship	State	Description
Magenta	United Kingdom	The ship was abandoned in the Atlantic Ocean. Her crew were rescued by Roderick Dhu (United Kingdom)). Magenta was on a voyage from Boston, Massachusetts, United States to London.

== 28 July ==
List of shipwrecks: 28 July 1860
Ship	State	Description
Chasely	United Kingdom	The ship ran aground at Maranhão, Brazil. She was on a voyage from Cardiff, Glamorgan to Maranhão. She was refloated the next day.
St. Lawrence	United Kingdom	The schooner was driven ashore near Maranhão.

== 29 July ==
List of shipwrecks: 29 July 1860
Ship	State	Description
Ganges	United Kingdom	The paddle tug foundered in the Atlantic Ocean (35°10′N 13°00′W). Her crew took to three boats; two of them reached Madeira, the third, with ten crew on board, reached Tenerife, Canary Islands. Ganges was on her delivery voyage, from the Clyde to India.
Topsy	United Kingdom	The brigantine foundered in the Atlantic Ocean (36°40′N 7°45′W). Her eight crew were rescued by the schooner Mariner (United Kingdom). Topsy was on a voyage from Cardiff, Glamorgan to Barcelona, Spain.

== 30 July ==
List of shipwrecks: 30 July 1860
Ship	State	Description
Clipper	United Kingdom	The ship sprang a leak. She put in to Dundee, Forfarshire where she was beached. She was on a voyage from Liverpool, Lancashire to Narva, Russia.

== 31 July ==
List of shipwrecks: 31 July 1860
Ship	State	Description
Challenger	United Kingdom	The barque was driven ashore at La Playa Honda. Her crew were rescued. She was on a voyage from Buenos Aires, Argentina to a port in Uruguay. She subsequently became a wreck.
Hamilton Grey	United Kingdom	The barque was driven ashore on Cape Sable Island, Nova Scotia, British North America. She was on a voyage from Eastport, Maine, United States to Liverpool, Lancashire. She was refloated with the assistance of a steamship.
HMS Termagant	Royal Navy	The Termagant-class frigate ran aground at "Point Laura", on the south east coast of the United States. Subsequently refloated, repaired and returned to service.

== Unknown date ==
List of shipwrecks: Unknown date in July 1860
Ship	State	Description
Bella	Spain	The brig was wrecked on Green Turtle Cay. Her crew were rescued by a United States Navy warship.
Clotilda	United States	The wreck of Clotilda, from a 1914 book. After making the last known voyage to the United States by a slave ship, the 86-foot (26.2 m) two-masted schooner was burned to the waterline and scuttled by her owner at Twelve Mile Island in the Alabama River in Alabama.
Eugene	Flag unknown	The ship was wrecked at Westport, Nova Scotia, British North America before 17 July. She was on a voyage from Saint John, New Brunswick, British North America to Cork, United Kingdom. She was consequently condemned.
Frederick Gebhardt	United States	The ship was wrecked off Paraíba, Brazil before 3 July. All 48 people on board were rescued. She was on a voyage from Liverpool, Lancashire, United Kingdom to Melbourne Victoria.
Helen Stewart	United Kingdom	The ship ran aground on the Pampus, off the coast of Zeeland, Netherlands. She was refloated and towed in to Hellevoetsluis.
Huron	France	The brig foundered in the Grand Banks of Newfoundland. Eight crew were rescued by Cap Rigge (France).
Marina	United Kingdom	The barque foundered off Moreton Island, Queensland before 21 July.
Pride of the Isles	(United Kingdom of Great Britain and Ireland) New Zealand	The schooner was wrecked a few miles south of Raglan, New Zealand. The ship's owner and three of the crew survived.
Templeman	United Kingdom	The barque was driven ashore near Nagasaki, Japan. Her twelve crew survived. She was on a voyage from Nagasaki to Shanghai, China.
Union	(United Kingdom of Great Britain and Ireland) New South Wales	The stern frame of the schooner Union was found four miles south of the Manukau bar, New Zealand, on July 25. She had sailed from Sydney on June 29.
Villafranca	United Kingdom	The ship was driven ashore in Delaware Bay. She was on a voyage from Newcastle upon Tyne, Northumberland to Philadelphia, Pennsylvania, United States. She was refloated on 11 July.
