= Stephan Kampwirth =

German actor (born 1967)

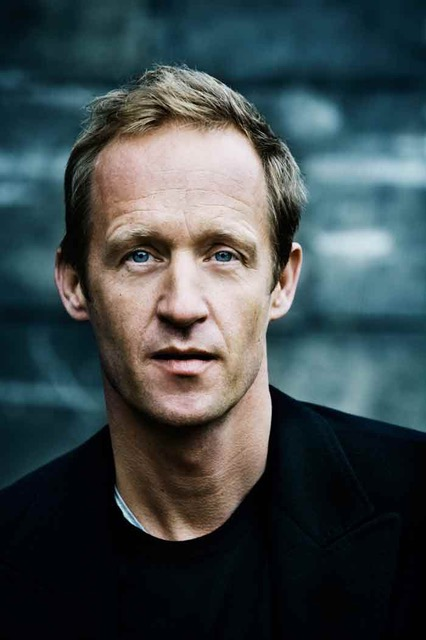
- Kampwirth in 2012
- Born: 20 March 1967 (age 59); Arnsberg, North Rhine-Westphalia, West Germany
- Occupation: Actor
- Years active: 1991–present
- Known for: Dark

Stephan Kampwirth (born 20 March 1967) is a German theatre and screen actor.

== Biography ==
Kampwirth graduated from Franz Stock High School in Arnsberg in 1986 and then did his civilian service as an ambulance driver in Munich. After training at the Hamburg drama studio from 1989 until 1992 under the direction of Hildburg Frese, Kampwirth worked at the Schiller Theater in Berlin, the Burgtheater in Vienna, and the Kammerspiele in Munich. He performed under the direction of Leander Haußmann, Dieter Dorn, Georg Ringsgwandl, and Helmut Griem.

His film and television career began in the early 1990s with smaller roles in television series such as Großstadtrevier, Wolffs Revier, and Tatort. He became known to a wider audience with the television miniseries Ein unmöglicher Mann and the film version of Amelie Fried's novel Der Mann von Nebenan, in which he played the role of Lukas Lander. Kampwirth has been part of the Hamburg Kammerspiele ensemble in his adopted home of Hamburg since 2007. From 2013 until 2015, he played Dr. Bode in the television series Lerchenberg. In 2016, he played the role of Walter Richter in the film adaptation of Peter Stamm's Agnes, next to Odine Johne, who portrayed the titular role. Since 2017, Kampwirth has held one of the lead roles in the Netflix science fiction series Dark, that of Peter Doppler.

== Selected filmography ==
=== Film ===
List of film appearances, with year, title, and role shown
Year	Title	Role	Notes
1996	Beyond Silence	Bankbeamter	
1998	23	Jochen Maiwald	
2001	Atlantis: The Lost Empire	Milo Thatch	Voice (German version)
2003	Wolfsburg	Klaus	
2013	Das Kleine Gespenst	Karls Vater	
2014	Who Am I	Martin Bohmer	
2024	A Sacrifice	Max	

=== Television ===
List of television appearances, with year, title, and role shown
Year	Title	Role	Notes
1991	Schulz & Schulz		1 episode
1992	Großstadtrevier		
1993	Wolffs Revier		
1999	Ein unmöglicher Mann		5 episodes
2001	Tatort		1 episode
2002	Wolffs Revier		
2003	Ein starkes Team		
2003	Tatort		
2004	Berlin, Berlin		2 episodes
2005	Der Dicke		1 episode
2005	Tatort		1 episode
2006	Das Duo		1 episode
2006	Stubbe – Von Fall zu Fall		
2006	Tatort		1 episode
2007	Der Kriminalist		
2008	Alarm für Cobra 11 – Die Autobahnpolizei		1 episode
2010	Tatort		1 episode
2011	Tatort		1 episode
2012	Cologne P.D.		1 episode
2012	Die Chefin	Marc Berger	ongoing
2012	Tatort		1 episode
2012	Das Duo		1 episode
2013–2015	Lerchenberg	Dr. Berthold Bode	
2013	Der letzte Bulle		1 episode
2016	Berlin Station		
2017–2020	Dark	Peter Doppler	3 seasons
2018	Der Bergdoktor		

== Awards ==
- Bavarian Art Award in the field of "performing arts" (1998)
- "Expression en corto" festival, "Best Actor" for Die Überraschung (2005)
- "Concorto" festival, short film category, "Best Actor" for Die Überraschung (2006)
- Rolf Mares Prize, Outstanding Performance Actor/Singer/Dancer category, for the portrayal of Sebastian in Wir lieben und wissen nichts at the Hamburg Kammerspiele (2013)
