= AAG =

AAG may refer to:

== Aviation ==
- Advanced Arresting Gear, an aircraft arresting system
- Air Atlantique, ICAO airline designator
- American Airlines Group
- Avelino Vieira Airport in Arapoti, State of Paraná, Brazil (IATA airport code AAG)

== Business ==
- American Advisors Group

== Film and television ==
- Aag (1948 film), a 1948 Bollywood film
- Aag (1994 film), a 1994 Bollywood film
- Aag (2007 film), a 2007 Bollywood film
- AAG TV, a Pakistani TV channel

== Medicine ==
- Acute angle closure glaucoma
- Alpha-1-acid glycoprotein, also referred to as Orosomucoid (ORM)
- Alkyladenine glycosylase; see Deamination
- Autoimmune autonomic ganglionopathy
- AAG, a codon for the amino acid lysine

== Organizations ==
- American Association of Geographers
- Association of Applied Geochemists
- Athletics Association of Guyana

== Technology ==
- AAG (cable system), an undersea cable system linking South East Asia with the US
- Anshel–Anshel–Goldfeld key exchange, a key exchange protocol

== Transportation ==
- AAG (1900 automobile), a German automotive company

== Other uses ==
- Ambrak language, a Torricelli language of Papua New Guinea
- Assistant adjutant general, a military title
- United States Assistant Attorney General, a ranking within the Department of Justice

== See also ==
- Agni (disambiguation)
- Agnee (disambiguation)
