= Raimondo Manzini (journalist) =

Italian politician

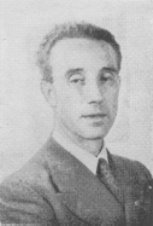
- Manzini in 1946
- Born: 18 February 1901; Lodi, Italy
- Died: 14 January 1988 (aged 86); Rome, Italy
- Occupations: Journalist, politician

Raimondo Manzini (18 February 1901 – 14 January 1988) was a veteran Catholic journalist and former Christian Democratic member of Italy's Parliament, who was director of L'Osservatore Romano from 1960 to 1978.

He had previously worked as an editor of the Italian Roman Catholic daily Avvenire and served three terms as a member of the Chamber of Deputies.

He was appointed as director of L'Osservatore by Pope John XXIII. Under his leadership, the paper made a few changes in style. Stories about papal pronouncements read "the Pontiff said" rather than "as was heard from the august lips of the illuminated Holy Father".

He also sought to give more space to photographs and cultural news, before retiring in 1978. He died at the age of 86 in 1988.
