= Agnee (album) =

Studio album by Agnee
- Released: 27 April 2007 (Audio CD); 15 May 2007 (Audio Cassette)
- Recorded: Sound Ideaz, Pune
- Genre: Fusion Rock
- Length: 34:10
- Label: Sony BMG

Agnee is the debut album by Pune-based fusion rock band Agnee. The album was released on April 27, 2007. It has eight tracks with only two featured music video tracks, 'Sadho Re' & 'Kabira' featuring the poems of Saint Kabir Das. 'The MTV Roadies Theme' track features the show host Raghu Ram.

All the songs (except tracks 1 & 2) were recorded & mixed by Nitin Joshi at Sound Ideaz, Pune and mastered by Ty deGroff at The Final Sound, Albuquerque. Tracks 1 & 2 were recorded by Kunal and mixed & mastered by Tyrone Fernandes at Yatra, Mumbai.

The album sleeve mentions Sandeep Chowta as special contributor for the songs 'Sadho Re' and 'Kabira'.

== Track listing ==
All music composed by Koko, Mohan & Arijit.

No.	Title	Length
1.	"Sadho Re"	4:11
2.	"Kabira"	4:32
3.	"Shaam Tanha"	4:59
4.	"Ujale Baaz"	4:05
5.	"Karvan"	3:55
6.	"Kuch Ankahee"	3:57
7.	"Keh Lene Do"	4:27
8.	"The MTV Roadies Theme (feat. Raghu)"	4:04

== Personnel ==
- Kaustubh Dhavale (Koko) — Guitars, backing vocals
- Kannan Mohan (Mohan) — Vocals, percussions, guitars
- Arijit Datta – Vocals, bass
