= Agni (disambiguation) =

Agni is a Hindu deity.

Agni may also refer to:

== Places ==
- Karasahr, originally known as Agni or Ārśi, an ancient city in Xinjiang, China
- Agni, Karnataka, India, a panchayat village
- 398188 Agni, an asteroid

== Arts and entertainment ==
- Agni (1978 film), an Indian Malayalam-language film
- Agni (1989 film), an Indian Telugu-language action film
- Agni (2004 film), an Indian Bengali-language film
- Agnee (2014 film), or Agni, a Bangladeshi Bengali-language film
- Agni (2024 film), an Indian Hindi-language film
- Agni (opera), a 2007 opera in Sinhalese by Premasiri Khemadasa, libretto by Eric Illayapparachchi
- Agni (Black Butler character), a character in the manga and anime series Black Butler
- Agni, a member of the Onslaught (DC Comics) team of terrorists
- Agni Kai, a firebending duel in Avatar: The Last Airbender; see The Last Airbender Prequel: Zuko's Story
- Agni (Devil May Cry), a fire-themed sword in the video game Devil May Cry 3: Dante's Awakening
- Agni, the protagonist and main character of the Japanese manga Fire Punch
- Agni, God of Fire in the 1968 novel Lord of Light by Roger Zelazny
- Agni, the third chakra (group) of Melakarta ragas in Carnatic music

== People ==
- Agni or Anyi people in Ghana and Ivory Coast
- Agni Vlavianos Arvanitis (1936–2018), American biologist
- Agni Chopra (born 1998), American-Indian cricketer
- Agni Pratistha (born 1987), actress and beauty queen, Miss Indonesia 2006
- Agni Shridhar, Indian Kannada former gangster, writer, critic and film director
- Agni Zygoura (born 1966), Greek handball player

== Other uses ==
- Agni (Ayurveda), the "fire" that drives all digestion and metabolism in the Hindu medical practice of Ayurveda
- AGNI (magazine), an American literary magazine
- Agni (missile), a family of medium to intercontinental range ballistic missiles developed by India
- Cyclone Agni, a 2004 tropical cyclone
- Agni Air, a defunct airline in Nepal
- Agni or Anyin language, spoken principally in Ivory Coast and Ghana
- Agne or Agni, an early king of Sweden in Norse mythology
- Advocate General for Northern Ireland
- Attorney General for Northern Ireland

== See also ==
- Agnee (disambiguation)
- AAG (disambiguation)
- Agnes (disambiguation)
- Agni Poolu (disambiguation) including "Agni Pulu"
