= Giovanni Maria Vian =

Italian journalist (born 1952)

Giovanni Maria Vian (born March 10, 1952) is an Italian professor of patristic philology and a journalist. Vian was born in Rome. He was the editor-in-chief of L'Osservatore Romano from 2007 to 2018.

== Editorial positions ==
As director of L'Osservatore, he had to face controversy over whether the paper was giving unwarranted support to the Barack Obama administration.
