= Pulu =

Pulu may refer to:

== People ==
- Augustine Pulu (born 1990), New Zealand rugby player
- Finau Pulu (born 1987), New Zealand netball player
- Kisi Pulu (born 1979), rugby player
- Leivaha Pulu (born 1990), Tonga rugby player
- Peter Pulu (born 1975), Papua New Guinea athlete
- Pulu or Tiglath-Pileser III, king of Assyria
- Pulu Poumele (1972–2016), American American football player
- Toni Pulu (born 1989), rugby player
- Viliami Pulu (born 1960), Tongan boxer
- ʻIsileli Pulu (born 1957), Tongan politician

== Places ==
- Pulu, Nepal

== Other ==
- Pulu (album), by Ismo Alanko Säätiö (1998)
- Pulu (material), a silky material obtained from the fibers of a tree fern of Hawaii
- Pulu, ancient precursor of the game polo

== See also ==
- Agni Poolu (disambiguation) including "Agni Pulu"
