= Agni Poolu =

Agni Poolu (lit. 'Fire Flower' in Telugu) may refer to:

- Agni Poolu, a novel by Indian writer Yaddanapudi Sulochana Rani
- Agni Poolu (film), a 1981 Indian film

== See also ==
- Agni (disambiguation)
- Pulu (disambiguation)
