= L'Osservatore Romano =

Daily newspaper of Vatican City

Coordinates: 41°54′19″N 12°27′25″E

- Unicuique suum – non praevalebunt

- L'Osservatore Romano print edition on 8 May 2025
- Type: Daily in Italian; Weekly in other languages
- Format: Broadsheet
- Owner: The Holy See
- Editor: Andrea Monda
- Founded: 1 July 1861; 165 years ago
- Headquarters: Via del Pellegrino - 00120; Vatican City
- ISSN: 0391-688X
- Website: osservatoreromano.va

L'Osservatore Romano (Note: Italian: [losservaˈtoːre roˈmaːno]; lit. 'The Roman Observer') is the daily newspaper of Vatican City which reports on the activities of the Holy See and events taking place in the Catholic Church and the world. It is owned by the Holy See but is not an official publication, a role reserved for the Acta Apostolicae Sedis, which acts as a government gazette. The views expressed in the Osservatore are those of individual authors unless they appear under the specific titles "Nostre Informazioni" or "Santa Sede".

Available in nine languages, the paper prints two Latin mottos under the masthead of each edition: Unicuique suum ('To each his own') and Non praevalebunt ('[The gates of Hell] shall not prevail'). (Note: From Matthew 16:18: Et ego dico tibi quia tu es Petrus et super hanc petram aedificabo ecclesiam meam et portae inferi non praevalebunt adversum eam (Latin Vulgate)) The current editor-in-chief is Andrea Monda.

== Editions ==
L'Osservatore Romano is published in eight different languages (listed by date of first publication):

- Daily and weekly in Italian (1861/1950)
- Weekly in French (1949)
- Weekly in English (1968)
- Weekly in Spanish (1969)
- Weekly in Portuguese (1970)
- Weekly in German (1971)
- Monthly in Polish (1980)
- Weekly in Malayalam (2007)

The daily Italian edition of L'Osservatore Romano is published in the afternoon, but with a cover date of the following day, a convention that sometimes results in confusion. The weekly English edition is distributed in more than 129 countries, including English-speaking countries and locales where English is used as the general means of communication.

=== L'Osservatore della Domenica ===
L'Osservatore della Domenica is a weekly publication in Vatican City. It is the Sunday supplement to the L'Osservatore Romano. Founded in 1934, an illustrated weekly was published with the title L'Osservatore romano della Domenica (since 1951 L'Osservatore della Domenica). In 1979 it was reduced to a Sunday supplement.

=== L'Osservatore di Strada ===
Since 29 June 2022, another edition of L'Osservatore Romano has been published: L'Osservatore di Strada. It is published on the first Sunday of every month. On 29 June 2022, the first printed edition was distributed to those present at St. Peter's Square. On the same day, at the end of the Pope's service, the Pope made a remark at the end of his Marian prayer praising the newspaper.

== History ==
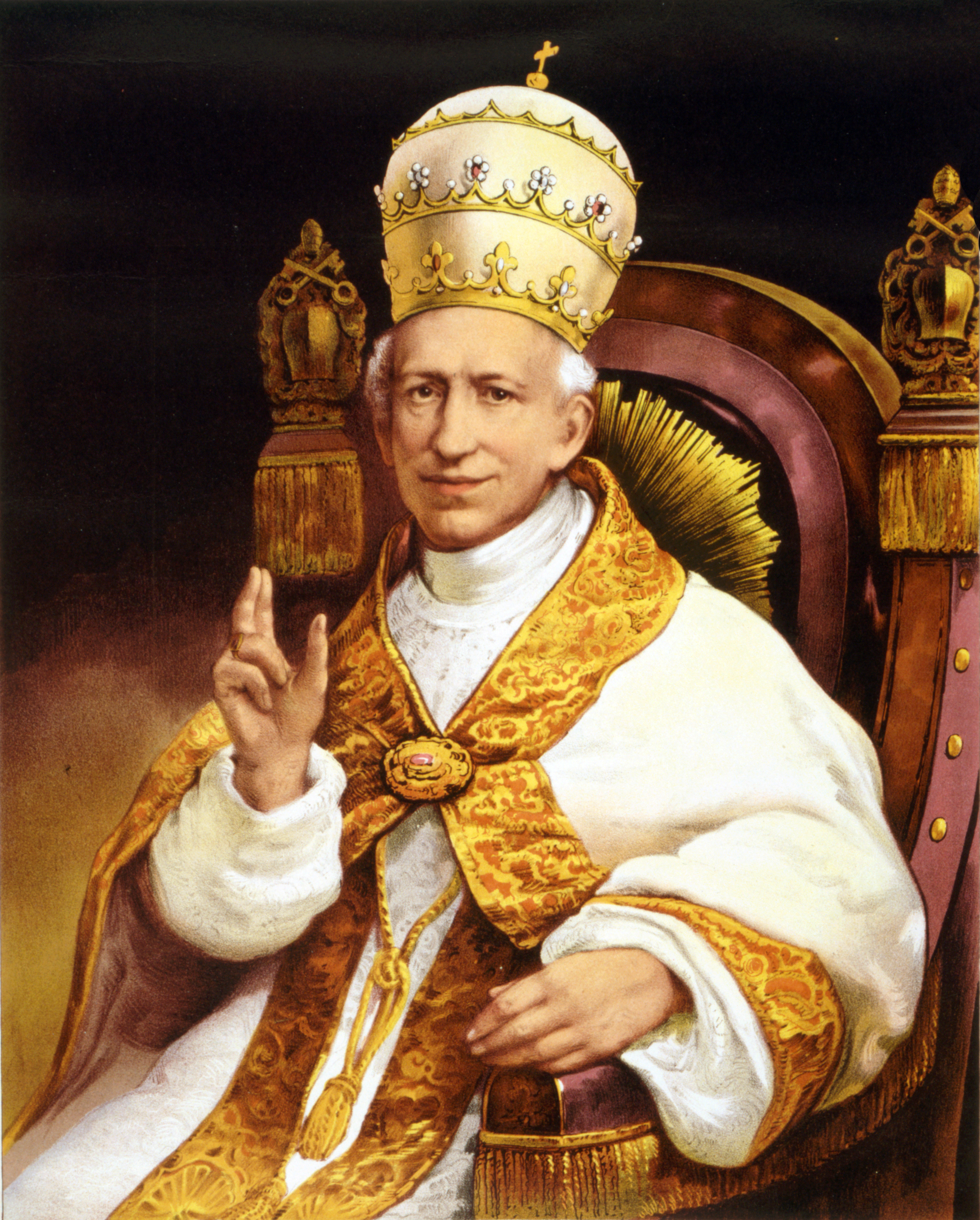
Under Pope Leo XIII, the Holy See acquired ownership of L'Osservatore in 1885.

=== 19th century ===
Giornale di Roma (27 November 1852)

L'Osservatore Romano: front page of 15 May 1891, publishing the encyclical Rerum Novarum of Pope Leo XIII

The first issue of L'Osservatore Romano was published in Rome on 1 July 1861, a few months after the Kingdom of Italy was proclaimed on 17 March 1861. The original intent of the newspaper was unabashedly polemical and propagandistic in defence of the Papal States, adopting the name of a private pamphlet financed by a French Catholic legitimist group. The 18 September 1860 defeat of papal troops at Castelfidardo substantially reduced the temporal power of the Pope, prompting Catholic intellectuals to present themselves in Rome for the service of Pope Pius IX. This agenda supported the notion of a daily publication to champion the opinions of the Holy See.

By July 1860, the deputy Minister of the Interior, Marcantonio Pacelli (grandfather of the future Pope Pius XII), had plans to supplement the official bulletin of the Catholic Church Giornale di Roma with a semi-official "rhetorical" publication. In early 1861, controversialist Nicola Zanchini and journalist Giuseppe Bastia were granted editorial direction of Pacelli's newspaper. Official permission to publish was sought on 22 June 1861, and four days later, on 26 June, Pius IX gave his approval for the regulation of L'Osservatore.

The first edition was entitled "L'Osservatore Romano – a political and moral paper" and cost five baiocchi. The "political and moral paper" epithet was dropped before 1862, adding instead the two Latin mottoes that still appear under the masthead today.

After the breach of Porta Pia by Italian troops in September 1870, L'Osservatore Romano solidified its opposition to the Kingdom of Italy, affirming obedience to the Pope and adherence to his directives, stating it would remain faithful "to that unchangeable principle of religion and morals which recognises as its sole depository and claimant the Vicar of Jesus Christ on earth".

=== 20th century ===
The Osservatore continued to be published as a newspaper in Vatican City, but in 1904, Acta Sanctae Sedis, which had existed since 1865, was declared the formal organ of the Holy See in that all documents printed in it were considered "authentic and official". Acta Sanctae Sedis ceased publication four years later and on 29 September 1908 Acta Apostolicae Sedis became the official publication of the Holy See.

The English weekly edition was first published on 4 April 1968. On 7 January 1998, that edition became the first to be printed outside of Rome, when for North American subscribers, it began to be printed in Baltimore. The edition was printed by the Cathedral Foundation, publishers of The Catholic Review.

=== 21st century ===
As of 1 July 2011, the English-language edition of the L'Osservatore Romano for North American subscribers is once again published in Rome.

In the 21st century, the paper has taken a more objective and subdued stance than at the time of its foundation, priding itself in "presenting the genuine face of the church and the ideals of freedom", following the statement by Cardinal Tarcisio Bertone in an October 2006 speech inaugurating a new exhibit dedicated to the founding and history of the newspaper. He further described the publication as "an instrument for spreading the teachings of the successor of Peter and for information about church events".

On 27 June 2015, Pope Francis, in an apostolic letter, established the Secretariat for Communications, a new part of the Roman Curia, and included L'Osservatore Romano under its management.

== Relation with the Magisterium ==
It is a common error to assume that the contents of the L'Osservatore Romano represent the views of the Magisterium, or the official position of the Holy See. In general, this is not the case, and the only parts of the Osservatore which represent the views of the Holy See are those that appear under the titles "Nostre Informazioni" or "Santa Sede". At times the Magisterium disputes the contents of the Osservatore, e.g. a 2008 article expressed the desire that the debate on brain death be reopened because of new developments in the medical world. An official spokesman said that the article presented a personal opinion of the author and "did not reflect a change in the Catholic Church's position".

== Leadership ==
Editors-in-chief

- Nicola Zanchini and Giuseppe Bastia (1861–1866)
- Augusto Baviera (1866–1884)
- Cesare Crispolti (1884–1890)
- Giovan Battista Casoni (1890–1900)
- Giuseppe Angelini (1900–1919)
- Giuseppe Dalla Torre di Sanguinetto (1920–1960)
- Raimondo Manzini (1960–1978)
- Valerio Volpini (1978–1984)
- Mario Agnes (1984–2007)
- Giovanni Maria Vian (2007–2018)
- Andrea Monda (2018–present)

== See also ==
- Index of Vatican City-related articles
- Vatican Media
- Vatican Radio
- Vatican News
