= Agnes (surname) =

Agnes (and its variant Agnès) is a surname. Notable people with the surname are as follows:

- Akite Agnes (born 1983), Ugandan stand-up comedian and actress
- Flavia Agnes (born 1947), Indian lawyer
- Lore Agnes (1876–1953), German politician
- Mario Agnes (1931–2018), Italian journalist
