= Agnes, Georgia =

Coordinates: 33.7459606°N 82.4284607°W

Agnes is an extinct town in Lincoln County, in the U.S. state of Georgia.

== History ==
A post office called Agnes was established in 1889, and remained in operation until 1955. The community once had a schoolhouse, now defunct. The community had an inland location away from the railroad.
