= Mario Agnes =

Italian journalist (1931–2018)

- Born: 6 December 1931; Serino, Italy
- Died: 9 May 2018 (aged 86); Vatican City

Mario Agnes (6 December 1931, Serino – 9 May 2018, Vatican City) was an Italian journalist. In 1984 he was appointed editor-in-chief of L'Osservatore Romano by Pope John Paul II. He held the position until his retirement in 2007, at which point he was honored by Pope Benedict XVI.
