= Agnus =

Agnus (Latin for lamb) can be used to refer to :

== People with the surname ==
- Felix Agnus (1839-1925), American military officer and newspaper publisher

== Religion ==
- Agnus Dei (Latin: "Lamb of God")
  - referring to Jesus Christ as divine sacrificial lamb
  - an early prayer of the breviary

== Places and jurisdictions ==
- Agnus (Egypt), an Ancient city and former bishopric in Aegyptus Primus, now a Latin Catholic titular see
- Agnus (Attica), a deme of ancient Attica

== Biology ==
- Agnus scythicus, Latin for Vegetable Lamb of Tartary, a mythologic lamb-plant
- Agnus (beetle), a stag beetle genus

== Technology ==
- MOS Technology Agnus, an integrated circuit in the OCS chipset of the Commodore Amiga computer

== In popular culture ==
- Agnus, one of the antagonistic factions in Xenoblade Chronicles 3.

== Other ==
- Asymmetric Gait Nail Unit Syndrome (AGNUS), a form of onycholysis (detachment of the nail)
