= AAG (1900 automobile) =

Defunct German automotive company

AAG, short for Allgemeine Automobil-Gesellschaft Berlin, was a German automobile company which offered only one car, a 5 hp (4 kW) voiturette designed by one Professor Klingenberg and manufactured between 1900 and 1901.

== History ==
The trademark for the name was registered on 28 November 1899 and registered on 8 February 1900. Production ended in 1901. The company factory was bought by the politician Emil Rathenau, also the head of the AEG Group. He renamed it to the Neue Automobil Gesellschaft (NAG for short), and the company produced cars until 1934.
