= Agnes (1877) =

Wooden carvel ketch built in 1877 at Williams River, Eagleton, Australia

Coordinates: 35.12°S 150.82°E

History

New South Wales
- Name: Agnes
- Owner: Benjamin Lloyd, Ed Davies, William Grisdale
- Port of registry: Newcastle, New South Wales
- Builder: William Mc Pherson at Williams River, Eagleton, New South Wales, Australia
- Completed: 1877
- Identification: Registration number: 3/1877; Official number: 70814
- Fate: Wrecked 1883

General characteristics
- Type: Wood carvel ketch
- Tonnage: 38 GRT; 38 NRT
- Length: 22.95 m (75 ft 4 in)
- Beam: 4.328 m (14 ft 2.4 in)
- Draught: 1.798 m (5 ft 10.8 in)

Agnes was a wooden carvel ketch built in 1877 at Williams River, Eagleton, near Newcastle, New South Wales, Australia. She was wrecked when she foundered off Jervis Bay, New South Wales, in 1883.
