= Agnes (case study) =

Research subject

Agnes is the pseudonym given to a transgender woman who participated in Harold Garfinkel's research in the early 1960s, making her the first subject of an in-depth discussion of transgender identity in sociology. She is the subject of a 2018 documentary short and a 2022 documentary, both titled Framing Agnes.

== Early life ==
Agnes was born in 1939 and assigned male at birth. She was the youngest of four children. Her mother worked in an aircraft plant; her machinist father died when she was eight. Agnes was raised Catholic, but stopped believing in God when she was older. From the age of twelve, she took her mother's post-hysterectomy estrogen pills and feminized her body.

In 1958 she was working as a typist for an insurance company, and had a boyfriend. She resisted his desire for intercourse and marriage, leading to a series of quarrels before she disclosed her details to him. Their relationship continued.

== Appearance ==
When Garfinkel first met Agnes, she possessed physiology typically associated with the social categories of "male" and "female" at the same time. She had a penis and testicles as well as secondary female characteristics such as breasts. Garfinkel stated:

Agnes' appearance was convincingly female. She was tall, slim, with a very female shape. Her measurements were 38-25-38. She had long, fine dark-blonde hair, a young face with pretty features, a peaches-and-cream complexion, no facial hair, subtly plucked eyebrows, and no makeup except for lipstick. At the time of her first appearance she was dressed in a tight sweater which marked off her thin shoulders, ample breasts, and narrow waist. Her feet and hands, though somewhat larger than usual for a woman, were in no way remarkable in this respect. Her usual manner of dress did not distinguish her from a typical girl of her age and class. There was nothing garish or exhibitionistic in her attire, nor was there any hint of poor taste or that she was ill at ease in her clothing, as is seen so frequently in transvestites and in women with disturbances in sexual identification. Her voice, pitched at an alto level, was soft, and her delivery had the occasional lisp similar to that affected by feminine-appearing male homosexuals. Her manner was appropriately feminine with a slight awkwardness that is typical of middle adolescence.

— Harold Garfinkel, "Passing and the Managed Achievement of Sex Status in an Intersex Person" (1967)
