= Agnes (1849) =

1849 sailing vessel built in Nova Scotia, Canada

History

Nova Scotia
- Name: Agnes
- Port of registry: Pictou, Nova Scotia
- Builder: Point Brenley, Nova Scotia
- Launched: 1849
- Identification: Official number: 9000275
- Fate: Wrecked 10 March 1877

Australia
- Name: Agnes
- Owner: James Lloyd
- Port of registry: Sydney
- Identification: Registration number: 30/1869; Official number: 31599
- Fate: Wrecked

General characteristics
- Type: Wood brigantine
- Tonnage: 104 GRT
- Displacement: 100 NRT
- Length: 20.4 m
- Beam: 6.04 m
- Draught: 3.5 m
- Crew: 5

Agnes was a wooden brigantine built in 1849 at Point Brenley, Nova Scotia. She was first registered in Pictou, Nova Scotia. Later acquired by owners in Sydney, she was wrecked on the north side of the Wollongong breakwater in New South Wales on the evening of 10 March 1877, when the wind changed while she was trying to enter the harbour of Wollongong.
