= Agnes (1853) =

Australian cutter

Coordinates: 32.8°S 152°E

History

New South Wales
- Name: Agnes
- Owner: Henry Hardy
- Port of registry: Sydney
- Builder: James Bevan, Sydney Harbour, New South Wales, Australia
- Completed: 1853
- Identification: Registration number: 35/1853
- Fate: Wrecked 13 July 1860

General characteristics
- Type: Wood carvel cutter
- Tonnage: 13 GT
- Displacement: 13 NT
- Length: 11.97 m
- Beam: 3.169 m
- Draught: 1.432 m

The Agnes was a wooden carvel cutter built in 1853 in Sydney Harbour. It was lost at Newcastle Bight, New South Wales, on 13 July 1860, when it was blown ashore in a gale whilst travelling between Newcastle and Sydney. The ship master was Henry Hardy.
