= Agnes (cutter) =

History
- Name: Agnes
- Owner: Donovan
- Fate: Wrecked 4 July 1865

General characteristics
- Type: Wood Cutter
- Tonnage: 5 GRT
- Displacement: 5 NRT
- Length: m
- Beam: m
- Draught: m
- Installed power: NA

The Agnes was a wooden cutter that was wrecked when it run ashore on the New South Wales on 4 July 1865.
