= Agnes (1875) =

Wooden carvel schooner

Coordinates: 28.45°S 153.56°E

History

New South Wales
- Name: Agnes
- Owner: Alex Kethel
- Port of registry: Newcastle, New South Wales
- Builder: Edward Davis Brisbane Water, Gosford, New South Wales, Australia
- Completed: 1875
- Identification: Registration number: 5/1881; Official number: 73315
- Fate: Wrecked 12 March 1890

General characteristics
- Type: Wood carvel schooner
- Tonnage: 80 GRT
- Displacement: 80 NRT
- Length: 23.62 m
- Beam: 6.156 m
- Draught: 1.981 m
- Crew: 6

The Agnes was a wooden carvel schooner built in 1875 at Brisbane Water. On 12 March 1890, whilst in ballast between Sydney and Tweed River, she lost her sails in a gale 6 miles (9.7 km) and was wrecked north of Brunswick River heads. There were eight deaths.
