= Agnes (novel) =

1998 novel by Peter Stamm

- Author: Peter Stamm
- Language: German
- Publisher: Arche Verlag
- Publication date: August 1, 1998
- English publication date: 2000
- Media type: Print
- Pages: 152 pages
- ISBN: 978-3-7160-2245-0

Agnes is a 1998 novel by the Swiss writer Peter Stamm in his literary debut. The book was first published in German on August 1, 1998, through Arche Verlag and follows a romance between a nameless older man and Agnes, a young woman that is almost half his age. Of the book, Stamm commented that he saw the book's landscape and climate as an important way of setting the tone for the novel and its characters.

The book has been adapted into a radio play and in 2012, Agnes was adapted into a stage play by Christian Papke.

== Synopsis ==
The book takes place in Chicago and is told through the eyes of a narrator whose name is never given and begins with him announcing that Agnes is dead. He then recalls how he had first met Agnes at the Chicago Public Library in April, nine months prior to the novel's beginning. The two hit it off and eventually have sex, with Agnes telling him that it is her first time. Agnes and the narrator go through a series of everyday events, eventually culminating in her getting pregnant. He doesn't want the baby and suggests an abortion, much to Agnes's dismay. She leaves him and he's left heartbroken. The two eventually reunite after she grows ill and miscarries, but the loss takes an irreversible toll on their relationship. But one of the main themes in the novel is the story that Agnes wants the narrator to write. He starts off by writing their story so far: how they met, how they fell in love and so on. But when he reaches the present he keeps on writing. He decides what Agnes should wear, what they should eat and even what they should say. Agnes plays along at first, obeying everything that the narrator writes in 'their story'. But when Agnes tells the narrator that she's pregnant the reality and the narrator's story start to drift apart. The narrator actually tries to 'fix reality' in his writing. This ultimately leads to the end of the relationship, after which the narrator seems to have a mental breakdown while it's completely unclear what happens to Agnes.

== Awards ==
- 1999 Rauris Literature Prize
