= Agnee (band) =

Indian rock band

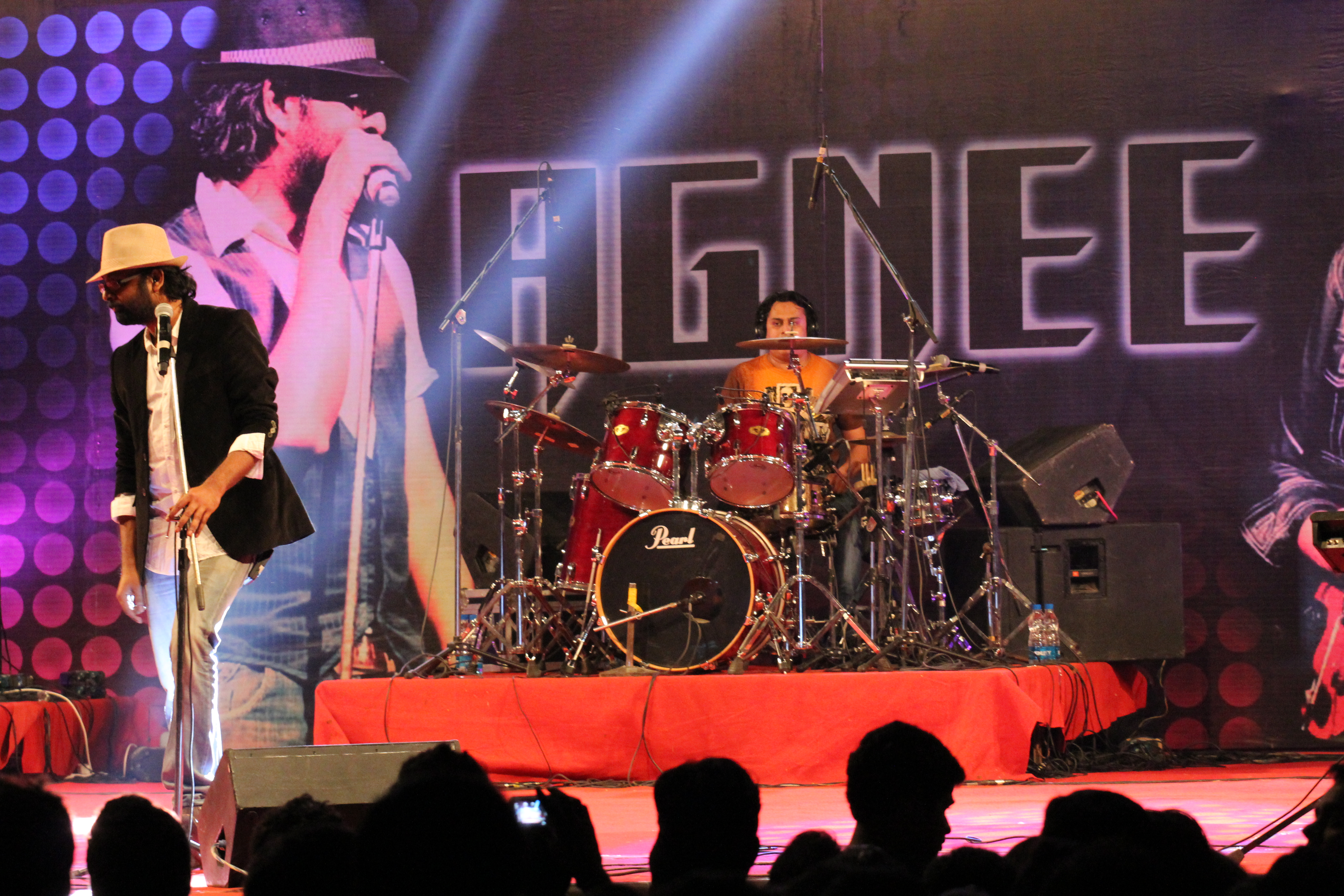

Background information
- Origin: Pune, India
- Genre: Rock
- Years active: 2007–present
- Label: Sony Music
- Members: Kannan Mohan; Kaustubh Dhavale; Hrishikesh Datar; Chirayu

Agnee is an Indian rock band based in Pune, India. The band's debut album "Agnee" was released on 15 May 2007. Since then, they have released several singles and used an Internet-based free distribution model. The band continues to use their 'Create with Agnee' venture in collaboration with Radio Mirchi.

== History ==
Agnee was formed in 2007 by banking executive turned musician Kannan Mohan and former Agni guitarist Kaustubh Dhavale(better known by his stage name Koco). The band was soon signed by Sony BMG. Agnee is one of the very few Indian rock bands to have signed a major label record deal. In 2012, the band composed the music for the Indian release of Marvel's superhero film, The Avengers (2012). They also performed the song "Aahatein" for MTV Splitsvilla 4, which subsequently became one of the band's most renowned tracks.

== Music ==
They have collaborated with the bass player Etienne Mbappe (from Cameroon) to work on a Punjabi song together.

== Tours and live shows ==
=== Music festivals ===
- Bir Music Festival (June 2024)
- Repertwahr Festival
- GIFLIF Indiestaan Festival (2024)

== Song list ==
1. Aahatein - MTV Splitsvilla 4 -2010
2. Sadho Re - 2007
3. Shaam Tanha - 2007
4. Kaise Ho Tum - 2022
5. Kabira - 2007
