= Nina Kronjäger =

German actress

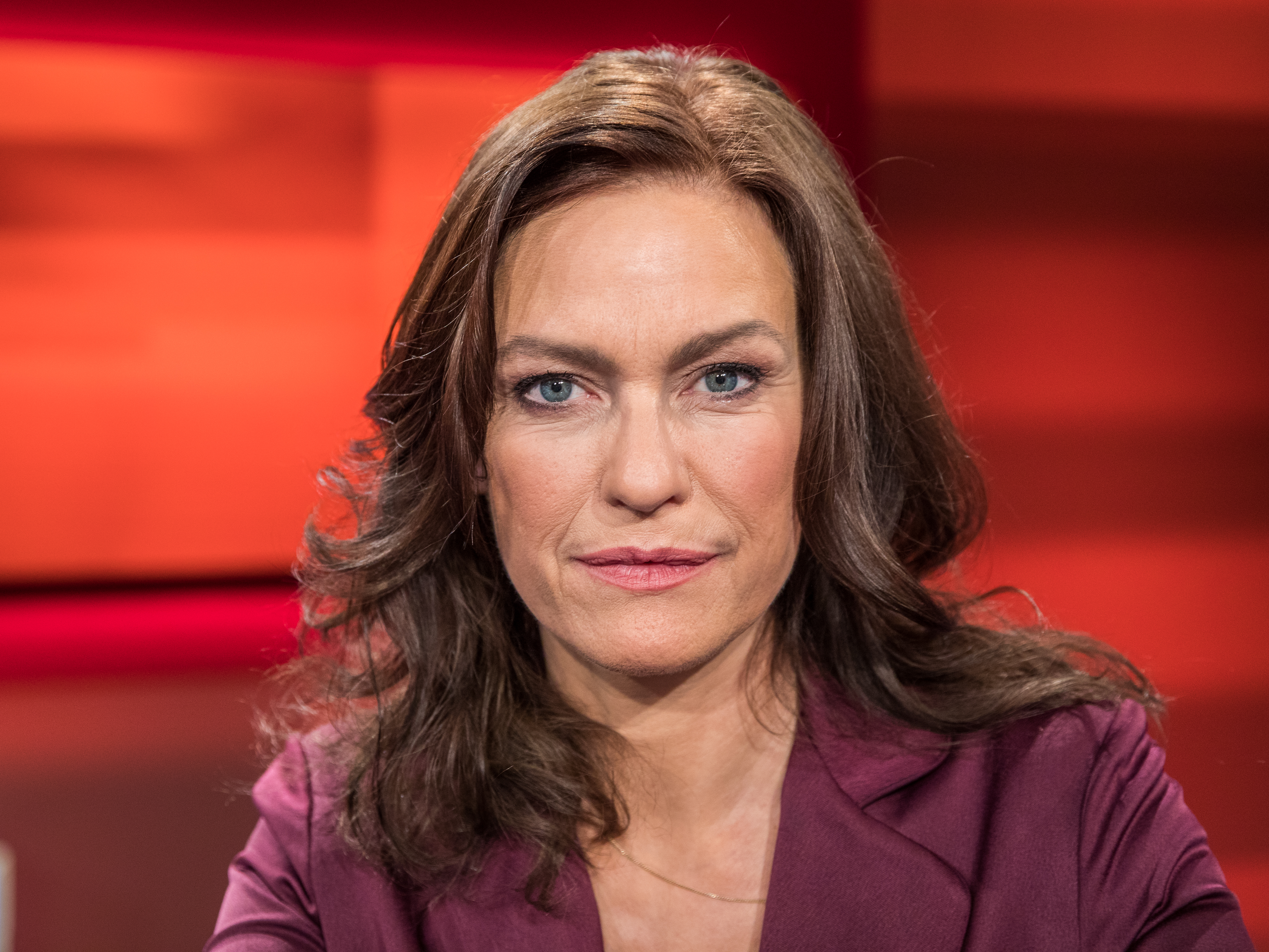
- Born: 26 February 1967; Marburg, West Germany
- Occupation: Actress
- Years active: 1984–present
- Partner: Thomas Heinze (1992–2002)

Nina Kronjäger (born 26 February 1967) is a German actress. She had her breakthrough in 1993 as the nurse Maischa in Katja von Garnier's Abgeschminkt!. Since then, she has appeared in over 90 film and television productions.

== Career ==
Kronjäger was born in Marburg. She made her debut in 1985 as Martina under the direction of Peter Grandl in the film drama AIDS – Die schleichende Gefahr. She then completed her acting training from 1986 to 1990 at the Münchener Otto Falckenberg School of the Performing Arts in Munich. She began her theater career at the Theater Kiel, where she performed in numerous productions until 1992. Afterwards, she acted at the Schauspielhaus Zürich (1992/93) and the Theater am Turm in Frankfurt (1993/95).

In Katja von Garnier's one-hour university film Abgeschminkt! (1993) for the HFF München, which was released nationwide and attracted a total of 1.2 million viewers, she played the lead role of the lively and daring nurse Maischa alongside Katja Riemann. Since then, Kronjäger has appeared in numerous films for both cinema and television. In 1997, Peter Wekwerth cast her in his everyday drama Schlank bis in den Tod, in which she played the anorexic Teresa Bille alongside her then-partner Thomas Heinze. That same year, she took on the title role in Susanne Zanke's comedy Ein Schloß für Rita (A Castle for Rita). In Peter Keglevic’s thriller Vickys Alptraum (Vicky's Nightmare), she appeared in 1998 as Anka, the friend of Katja Flint's character. From 1998 to 2000, she had a regular role in the series T.E.A.M. Berlin as explosives expert Nathalie Pohl. In 2004, she again acted alongside Thomas Heinze in the twelve-part ZDF television series Typisch Mann!, playing the role of Nina Wolf.

She appeared on the cinema screen between 2013 and 2018 in the "Ostwind" films Windstorm, Windstorm 2 and Windstrom 3 playing the role of Elisabeth Schwarz. In the ZDF Saturday crime series Kommissarin Heller, she took on a recurring role as lawyer Silvie Verhoeven from 2013 to 2021, alongside Hans-Jochen Wagner.

== Private life ==
Kronjäger is involved with the nonprofit organizations Plan International (since 1993) und KARO.

She was in a relationship with her acting colleague Thomas Heinze from 1992 to 2002 and has a pair of twins with him, born in 2003.

== Acting credits ==
=== Film ===
- 1985: AIDS – Die schleichende Gefahr as Martina
- 1993: Abgeschminkt! as Maischa
- 2006: Atomised as Katja
- 2013: Windstorm as Elisabeth Schwarz
- 2015: Windstorm 2 as Elisabeth Schwarz
- 2015: Windstorm 3 as Elisabeth Schwarz
- 2019: Gate to Heaven as Laura Sternvall

=== Television ===
- 1994: Die Stadtindianer as Ina Schmitz (Episode 10)
- 1998: Polizeiruf 110: Spurlos verschwunden
- 1998–2000: T.E.A.M. Berlin as Nathalie Pohl
- 1999–2001: Watership Down as Primrose (voice, German dub)
- 2004: Typisch Mann! as Nina Wolf
- 2006: Stolberg as Eva Mattek (Episode 4)
- 2008: Löwenzahn as sheep farmer Jette (Episode 35)
- 2009: Leipzig Homicide as Linda Esser (Episode 145)
- 2010: KDD – Kriminaldauerdienst as Martina Beck
- 2011: Covert Affairs as Elsa von Hagen / Petra Müller (Episode 23)
- 2012: SOKO Wismar as Stefanie Kosterlitz (Episode 153)
- 2012: Letzte Spur Berlin as Claudia de Vries (Episode 1)
- 2012: The Last Cop as Ursula Hertel (Episode 38)
- 2013: Die Chefin as Anna Hoffman (Episode 153)
- 2013–2021: Kommissarin Heller as Silvie Verhoeven
- 2014: Winnetous Weiber as Maren Bogner
- 2014: Der Bergdoktor as Irene Bäumler (Episode 73)
- 2015: Notruf Hafenkante as Dr. Iris Schaller (Episode 211)
- 2015: Mordkommission Istanbul as Iris Bischoff (Episode 13)
- 2016, 2023: Alarm for Cobra 11 – The Highway Police as Marion Dregger (Episode 301), Louise Leclercq (Episode 379)
- 2019: The Old Fox as Dr. Johanna Westhusen (Episode 427)
- 2020: Dark as Female Stranger
