= Look Who's Back =

2012 satire novel by Timur Vermes

Er ist wieder da
- Cover art
- Author: Timur Vermes
- Language: German
- Genre: Satire
- Publisher: Eichborn Verlag
- ISBN: 978-3847905172

Look Who's Back (German: Er ist wieder da, pronounced [ˈeːɐ̯ ʔɪst ˈviːdɐ daː]; transl. "He's back again") is a German satirical novel about Adolf Hitler by Timur Vermes, published in 2012 by Eichborn Verlag. The novel was adapted into a German film of the same name, which was released in 2015.

== Plot ==
In 2011, Adolf Hitler wakes up in a vacant lot in Berlin which appears to be the location of the garden outside the bunker where his body was burnt, with no knowledge of anything that happened following his death in 1945. Homeless and destitute, he interprets everything he sees and experiences in 2011 from a Nazi perspective—for instance, he assumes that Turks in Germany are an indicator of Karl Dönitz having persuaded Turkey to join the Axis, and thinks that Wikipedia is named for Wikinger ("Vikings").

Although he is recognised by everyone he passes, nobody believes that he is actually Hitler; instead, they think he is either a comedian or a method actor. He appears on a variety television show called Whoa, dude!, going off-script to broadcast his views. Videos of his angry rants become hugely successful on YouTube, and he achieves modern celebrity status as a performer. The newspaper Bild tries to take him down, but is sued into praising him. He is attacked by Neo-Nazis who assume he is mocking Hitler's memory, unaware that he is the genuine article. In the end, he uses his popularity to re-enter politics.

== Characters (including main, supporting and recurring) ==
*the letters in bold indicate that a character is the main character. The (**) indicates which characters' first names were renamed and/or which characters were changed in the 2015 film adaptation.

- **Adolf Hitler**
- Joachim Sensenbrink**
- Frank Sawatzki**
- Madam Carmen Bellini**
- Vera Krömeier**
- The Man at the Kiosk
- Ali Gagmez**

(**in the 2015 film adaptation, Sensenbrink's first name (Joachim) is renamed to Christoph, as the character is played by German actor and comedian Christoph Maria Herbst, who also narrated the German audiobook of the novel in 2012. As well as this, the first names of Sawatzki (Frank), Krömeier (Vera), and Bellini (Carmen) were also renamed to Fabian, Franziska and Katja respectively (as played by their respective actors Fabian Busch, Franziska Wulf [de] and Katja Riemann.). The character Ali Gagmez (the host of Whoa, dude! and who becomes jealous of Hitler's popularity on the show) is changed into Michael Witzigmann (played by Michael Kessler) in the film adaptation.)

== Publication ==
The book was priced at €19.33, a reference to Hitler's ascent to power in 1933. By March 2014 it had sold 1.4 million copies in Germany. The book has been translated into 41 languages. An English-language translation, Look Who's Back, translated by Jamie Bulloch, was published in April 2014 by MacLehose Press.

The original German audiobook version is read by comedian Christoph Maria Herbst and was released on 14 September 2012, and by May 2014 had sold over 520,000 copies. Herbst had already played the Hitler-based character of Alfons Hatler in two comedy films, Der Wixxer (2004) and Neues vom Wixxer (2007), which landed him the part of reading the audio version of the book written from the first-person point of view of Hitler, and furthermore played the role of Sensenbrink in the 2015 film adaptation. The British audiobook version is read by British actor Julian Rhind-Tutt, in which Rhind-Tutt played the role of Hitler in the British audio version, and was released on 3 April 2014.

Film rights were sold, as were foreign licence rights. A feature film premiered in Germany on 8 October 2015, starring Oliver Masucci as Hitler and directed by David Wnendt. As a part of the film's promotion campaign, Masucci was made to appear as Hitler in several German cities, including the filming locations of Brandenburg and Berlin, testing the public's reactions, including at least one appearance close to an National Democratic Party of Germany rally.

A BBC radio drama premiered five days earlier in that same year as part of their Reading Europe line, and starred David Threlfall as Hitler.

== Critical reception ==
In The Jewish Daily Forward, Gavriel Rosenfeld described the novel as "slapstick" but with a "moral message". Although acknowledging that Vermes' portrayal of Hitler as human, rather than a monster, is intended to give a better explanation of Germany's embrace of Nazism, Rosenfeld also states that the novel risks "glamorizing what it means to condemn"; readers can "laugh not merely at Hitler, but also with him."

In Süddeutsche Zeitung, Cornelia Fiedler posited that the book's success may be due less to its literary merits and more to the fact that its protagonist is Hitler. She stated that focusing on Hitler "either as a comic figure or as the incarnation of evil" risks obscuring the historical facts. Fiedler described Vermes' assumption that readers would agree that Hitler deserved mockery as "surprisingly naive".

In The Sydney Morning Herald, reviewer Jason Steger interviewed the author, who believed that the way Hitler is seen today "is one that hasn't too much to do with the real one." "Most people wouldn't think it possible that if they would have lived back then they would have thought he was in some way attractive too", he said.
