= Peter Sattmann =

German actor and musician (1947–2025)

- Born: 26 December 1947; Zwickau, Saxony, Allied-occupied Germany
- Died: 25 December 2025 (aged 77); Brandenburg, Germany
- Occupations: Film and stage actor, musician
- Children: Paula Riemann

Peter Sattmann (26 December 1947 – 25 December 2025) was a German actor and musician.

== Life and career ==
In 1957, Sattmann moved with his parents, Gerda and Ferdinand Sattmann, from Zwickau to Friedrichshafen, where he played in a band when he was twelve years old. He attended the Graf-Zeppelin-Gymnasium up to the eleventh class, when he left to concentrate on acting, moving to Munich and performing as a street musician.

Sattmann married when he was 21 years old, and in 1970 his youngest daughter, Katrin Sattmann, was born. He attended the Neue Münchner Schauspielschule, and in 1969 went to the Deutsches Theater in Göttingen. He was voted Schauspieler des Jahres in 1975 and in 1977 at the Württembergisches Staatstheater in Stuttgart.

He wrote a number of plays for which he directed the first performances, including "Open End", "Der Erzbischof ist da", "Brave New Man" and "Der Fallschirmspringer", and continued until 1990 at the Schiller Theater.

In addition to appearing in films, Sattmann also composed the music for the film "Willkommen im Paradies". He also composed music for “Kerbel's Escape”, “Der Prins muß her” and “Das Familienfest”.

From 1990 to 1998, he lived with Katja Riemann, and their daughter, Paula Riemann was born in 1993.

Sattmann died after a long illness in his place of residence in Brandenburg on 25 December 2025, one day before his 78th birthday.

== Filmography ==
- The Brothers (1977)
- Death or Freedom (1977)
- Das Ziel (1980, TV film)
- Der Fall Maurizius (1981, TV miniseries)
- Fire for the Big Dragon (1984, TV film)
- Kerbel's Escape (1984, TV film)
- Silent Poison (1984, TV film)
- Das Rätsel der Sandbank (1984, TV miniseries)
- In the Belly of the Whale (1985)
- Der Prins muß her (1987, TV series)
- Karambolage (1989, TV film)
- Fool's Mate (1989)
- Le grand secret (1989, TV miniseries)
- Dick Francis Mysteries: In The Frame (1989, TV)
- Tote leben nicht allein (1990, TV film)
- No Mention of Violence (1991, TV film)
- Making Up! (1993)
- Gefährliche Verbindung (1993, TV film)
- Nur eine kleine Affäre (1994, TV miniseries)
- Lauras Entscheidung (1994, TV film)
- Virus X (1997, TV film)
- Bandits (1997)
- Women Don't Lie (1998)
- St. Pauli Night (1999)
- Men Do What They Can (2012)
