= Comedian Harmonists (film) =

- Directed by: Joseph Vilsmaier
- Screenplay by: Klaus Richter, Jürgen Egger
- Produced by: Reinhard Klooss
- Starring: Heinrich Schafmeister; Max Tidof; Ulrich Noethen; Heino Ferch; Ben Becker; Kai Wiesinger
- Cinematography: Joseph Vilsmaier
- Edited by: Peter R. Adam
- Music by: Harald Kloser, Thomas Schobel, Walter Jurmann (Songs)
- Production company: Perathon Film und Fernseh GmbH
- Distributed by: Senator Film (Germany); Miramax Films (USA)
- Release date: 25 December 1997 (Germany)
- Running time: 127 minutes
- Country: Germany
- Language: German
- Box office: $16 million (Germany)

Comedian Harmonists (English title: The Harmonists) is a 1997 German film, directed by Joseph Vilsmaier, about the popular German vocal group of the 1920s and '30s, the Comedian Harmonists. The film was supported by the German and Austrian film fund.

== Plot ==
In 1927, unemployed German-Jewish actor Harry Frommermann is inspired by the American group The Revelers to create a German group of the same format. He holds auditions and signs on four additional singers and a pianist. Naming themselves the "Comedian Harmonists", they meet international fame and popularity. However, they eventually run into trouble when the Nazis come to power, as half the group is Jewish.

== Cast ==
- Ben Becker as Robert Biberti
- Heino Ferch as Roman Cycowski
- Ulrich Noethen as Harry Frommermann
- Heinrich Schafmeister as Erich A. Collin
- Max Tidof as Ari Leschnikoff
- Kai Wiesinger as Erwin Bootz
- Meret Becker as Erna Eggstein
- Katja Riemann as Mary Cycowski
- Noemi Fischer as Chantal, Collin's girl friend
- Dana Vávrová as Ursula Bootz
- Otto Sander as Bruno Levy
- Michaela Rosen as Ramona, brothel madame
- Günter Lamprecht as Erik Charell
- Gérard Samaan as Roman's father
- Rolf Hoppe as Gauleiter Streicher
- Jürgen Schornagel as Reichsmusikdirektor
- Rudolf Wessely as Mr. Grünbaum
- Susi Nicoletti as Mrs. Grünbaum
- Giora Feidman as clarinet player
- Kathie Lindner as wardrobe mistress
- Trude Ackermann as Robert's mother

== Reception ==
Comedian Harmonists succeeded in Europe and was the highest-grossing German film of 1998 with a gross of over $16 million. U.S. President Bill Clinton told critic Roger Ebert it was among his favorite films of the year, although the movie did not get widespread release, hence reception in the United States.

Bernd Reinhardt of the World Socialist Web Site called it "an exciting film which is well worth seeing and which pays proper attention to the sextet's music." He also remarked on the film's attention to historical detail and the importance of its theme of musical internationalism.

== Awards and nominations ==
At the 1998 German Film Awards, Comedian Harmonists won the awards for Best Fiction Film, Best Editing (for Peter R. Adam), Best Actor (for Ulrich Noethen), Best Supporting Actress (for Meret Becker), and Best Production Design (for Rolf Zehetbauer). Joseph Vilsmaier was nominated for Best Direction, losing to Wim Wenders for The End of Violence. At the 1998 Bavarian Film Awards Joseph Vilsmaier won the awards for Best Director. Ben Becker, Heino Ferch, Ulrich Noethen, Heinrich Schafmeister, Max Tidof and Kai Wiesinger won a Special Prize.

Vilsmaier was nominated for Best Cinematographer for Comedian Harmonists at the 1998 European Film Awards.

== American version ==
The U.S. Miramax release contains at least one difference from the original: in the original, there is a scene, when the Harmonists arrive in New York and perform in front of the U.S. Navy, where the camera singles out one African American navy man who is visibly enjoying the music, until he gets a stinging look of rebuke from a superior officer. This segment was cut from the American release.

== Legacy ==
The film led to the writing of a musical play, Veronika, der Lenz ist da – Die Comedian Harmonists, which opened at the Komödie on the Kurfürstendamm in Berlin on 19 December 1997. When this production closed, the actors who had played the original sextet formed themselves into a new group called the Berlin Comedian Harmonists, which is still in existence in 2024.
