= Look Who's Back (film) =

2015 German film directed by David Wnendt

- German release poster
- Directed by: David Wnendt
- Screenplay by: Johannes Boss; Minna Fischgartl; David Wnendt
- Based on: Look Who's Back by Timur Vermes
- Produced by: Lars Dittrich; Christopher Müller
- Starring: Oliver Masucci; Fabian Busch; Katja Riemann; Christoph Maria Herbst; Franziska Wulf; Michael Kessler
- Cinematography: Hanno Lentz
- Edited by: Hans Funck
- Music by: Enis Rotthoff
- Production companies: Constantin Film; Mythos Film
- Distributed by: Constantin Film
- Release date: 8 October 2015 (Germany)
- Running time: 116 minutes
- Country: Germany
- Language: German
- Budget: €6,000,000 (US$3.3 million)
- Box office: $27.1 million

Look Who's Back (German: Er ist wieder da, pronounced [ˈeːɐ̯ ʔɪst ˈviːdɐ daː]; transl. "He's back again") is a 2015 German satirical black comedy film directed by David Wnendt and based on the 2012 novel of the same name by Timur Vermes. It is a work of political satire about former Führer Adolf Hitler waking up in the modern era, and his attempts to reintegrate with modern German society and politics.

The film features unscripted vignettes of Oliver Masucci as Adolf Hitler interacting with ordinary Germans, interspersed with scripted storyline sequences.

It was listed as one of eight films that could have been the German submission for the Best Foreign Language Film at the 89th Academy Awards, but it was not selected.

== Plot ==
In 2014, Adolf Hitler wakes up in the Berlin park where his Führerbunker once stood. Disoriented, he wanders through the city, interpreting modern situations from a wartime perspective. Mistaken for an impersonator, Hitler encounters a mime and an anxious young mother, the latter of which pepper-sprays him. He faints after reading a newspaper stating the year is 2014.

Meanwhile, at the MyTV television station offices, leading executive Christoph Sensenbrink is denied a promotion. Unleashing his rage, he fires Fabian Sawatzki, a freelance filmmaker. Sitting at home, Sawatzki spots Hitler in the background of his documentary footage and his mother suggests that a film about him would be successful. As Hitler wakes up at a newspaper kiosk, he reads about a changed Germany and laments the loss of his vision. Believing destiny has a purpose for him, Hitler decides to continue his work, and eventually he is found by Sawatzki.

Sawatzki proposes filming Hitler for YouTube and they embark on a journey across Germany. Hitler interacts with ordinary Germans and speaks to them about contemporary social and political issues. Sawatzki's idea for an animal-centric film clip ends abruptly when the normally animal-loving Hitler shoots a dog after it bites him.

Sawatzki introduces Hitler and his program idea to MyTV executives, including the new managing director, Katja Bellini (who got the promotion Sensenbrink desired). Bellini supports Hitler and his ideas while Sensenbrink is opposed. Hitler learns about the Internet and obsessively reads Wikipedia. On air, he speaks about the problems in modern German society which he noticed during his journey. The speech is remixed and talked about by various famous YouTubers, unintentionally becoming a comedy hit.

Hitler meets with various right wing fringe parties and laments that none of them have the rhetoric or leadership skills that he has. He identifies the Greens as the only acceptable party, reasoning that protection of the environment is protection of the fatherland. Meanwhile, Sensenbrink sends an anonymous complaint of incitement of racial violence to the public prosecutor, summoning police at the MyTV offices, only for the prosecutor to personally praise the show and dismiss the complaint as leftist drivel.

However, Sensenbrink finds the unedited footage of Hitler shooting the dog, and in an act of revenge broadcasts it during Hitler's next interview. This causes Hitler, Sawatzki and Bellini to all be fired from the station.

Hitler publishes a book titled "Er Ist Wieder Da" ("He is Back") about his new life, which becomes a popular bestseller, despite the controversy he has garnered for shooting the dog. Sawatzki turns Hitler's book into a film.

3 months later, without Hitler, MyTV's ratings plummet. In a fit of rage, which parodies a scene from Downfall, Sensenbrink ultimately decides to finance the film.

During filming, Hitler is attacked by Neo-Nazis who mistake him for a mocking impersonator. Hitler is hospitalized, and when news of this generates sympathy for him, his popularity soars. Sawatzki reviews his footage and travels to the spot where Hitler rose from the ground.

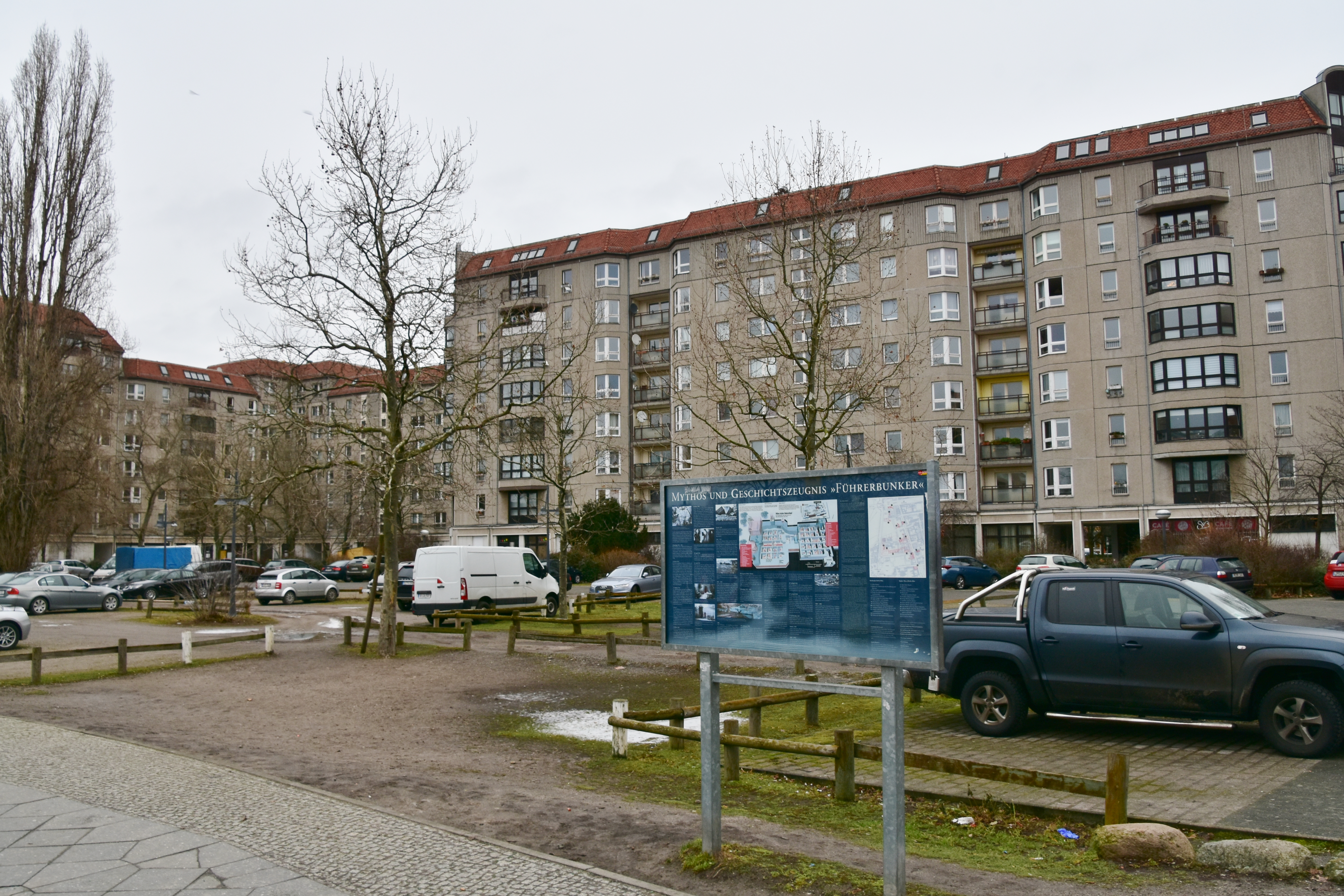
The site of the former Fuhrerbunker (pictured here in 2018) was used as a filming location

He discovers burnt leaves and a sign that the Führerbunker once stood at that location. Sawatzki realizes Hitler is not an impersonator and goes to confront him at the hospital, but Hitler has already been discharged, and only Bellini is in the room. Sawatzki tries to explain the truth to her, but she does not believe the story and hospital staff begins to chase him.

At the MyTV set, Hitler is filming when he is interrupted by Sawatzki holding him at gunpoint. Hitler allows Sawatzki to direct them to the rooftop, where Sawatzki shoots him off the side of the building. Hitler reappears behind him, unharmed, and the confrontation is revealed to be a film scene with an actor playing Sawatzki; the real Sawatzki had been committed to a mental hospital.

As Hitler's film finishes, he senses a political comeback. In the final scene, he and Bellini ride in a car through Berlin. The music tone changes sharply when bystanders begin performing the Nazi salute at him, and the film intersperses his monologue with clips of real-life contemporary far-right protests and interviews with politicians such as Marine Le Pen. Hitler says to himself: "I can work with this."

== Cast ==
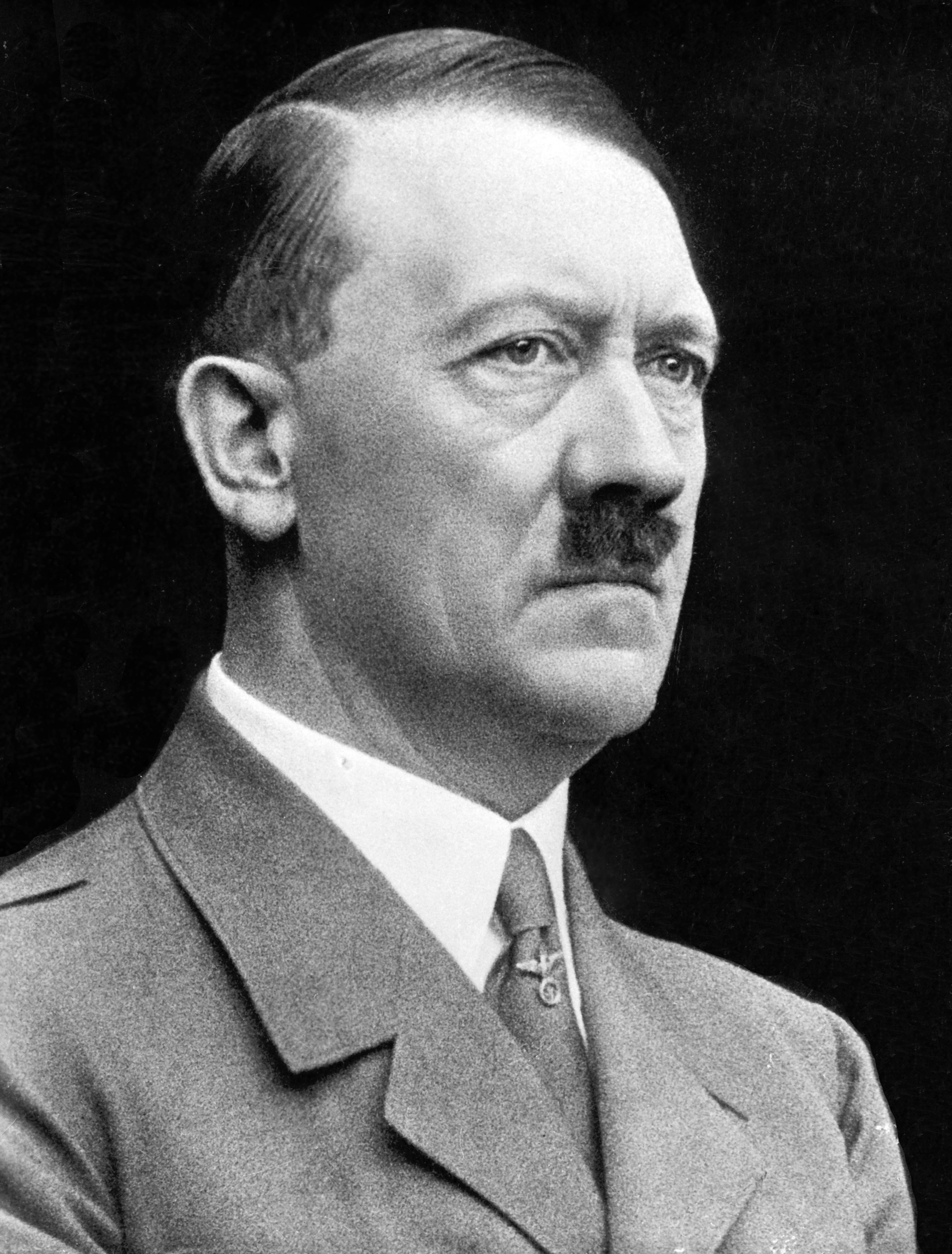
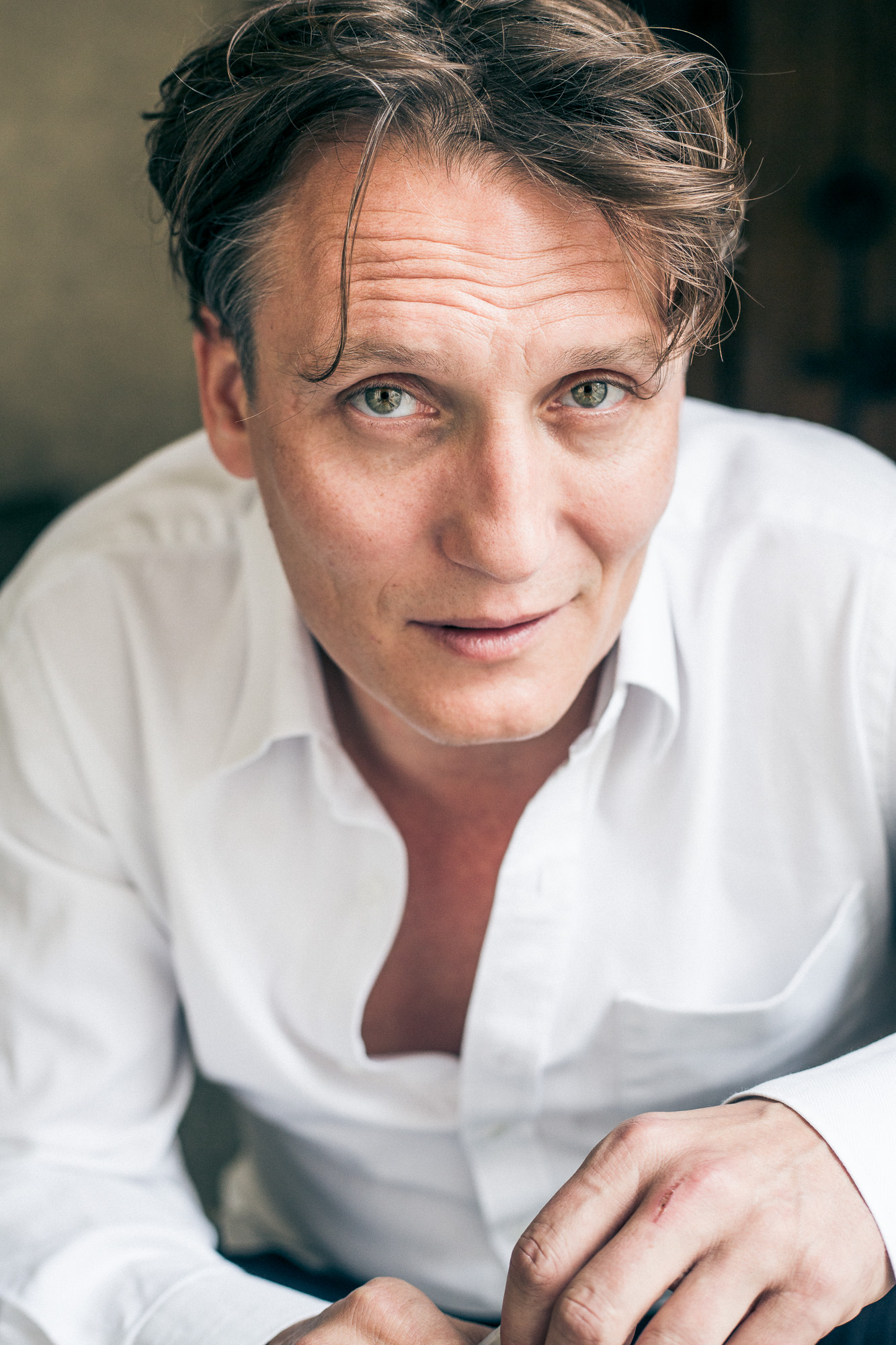
Adolf Hitler (pictured in 1937), and Oliver Masucci (in 2014)
- Oliver Masucci as Adolf Hitler
- Fabian Busch as Fabian Sawatzki
- Katja Riemann as Katja Bellini
- Christoph Maria Herbst as Christoph Sensenbrink
- Franziska Wulf as Franziska Krömeier
- Michael Kessler as Michael Witzigmann
- Thomas Thieme as Kärrner, TV-station boss
- Michael Ostrowski as Rico Mancello
- Lars Rudolph as kiosk owner
- Ramona Kunze-Libnow as Sawatzki's mother
- Gudrun Ritter as Grandma Krömeier
- Stephan Grossmann as Prosecutor Göttlicher
- Maximilian Strestik as Ulf Birne, a parody of real-life far-right German Politician Holger Apfel

As themselves in cameos (German TV and internet personalities): Klaas Heufer-Umlauf, Joko Winterscheidt, Frank Plasberg, Daniel Aminati, Jörg Thadeusz, Roberto Blanco, Micaela Schäfer, Dagi Bee, Freshtorge, Robert Hofmann, Joyce Ilg, Andrea Nahles, and Nina Proll.

Two actors in the film have previously played or parodied Hitler in other roles: Christoph Maria Herbst in Der Wixxer and Neues vom Wixxer (as the Hitler parody Alfons Hatler) and Michael Kessler in Switch reloaded (where he played Hitler in a series of parody sketches called Obersalzberg, which parodied the German mockumentary workplace sitcom Stromberg which also starred Christoph Maria Herbst as Stromberg. Herbst also narrated the audiobook version of the original novel.

Other links to other media about Hitler via the film’s cast members include Fabian Busch as Obersturmbannführer Gert Stehr in the 2004 German historical drama film Downfall and Katja Riemann as Eva Braun in the 2007 German historical dark comedy film Mein Führer – The Really Truest Truth about Adolf Hitler.

Scenes from the films The Great Dictator, and 1966 French film The Big Restaurant are also shown briefly.

== Production ==
The scene in which Sensenbrink rages about the network's failing performance parodies a scene from Downfall that became popular through internet parodies.

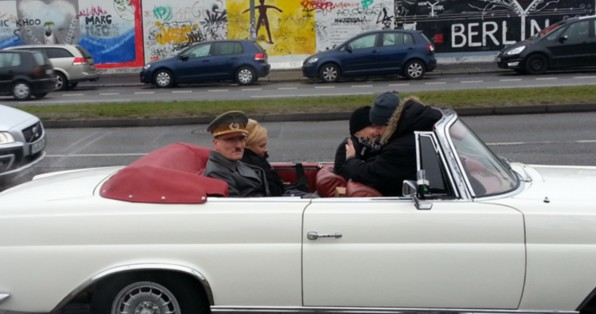
Filming in 2014

The total hours was reportedly 300 hours, of which a fraction was gathered for the final cut of the film.

According to (at the time 46 year old) Masucci (via The Guardian in 2015), he said he initially thought he was unsuited for the role of Hitler, saying, “For a start, I’m 1m 88cm, (about 10cm taller than Hitler)” and “my physiognomy is completely different.”. Reportedly, the casting process included having Masucci “cold-call the Deutche Opera Berlin pretending to be Hitler asking for tickets to a Wagner opera, as well as reciting one of [Hitler’s] speeches”. After that, Masucci said, “Once I got the part, I told my neighbours they shouldn’t wonder if they hear me yelling the place down. Later I spent two weeks locked in a Berlin hotel room with a language coach, studying [Hitler’s] dialogue and style,”. Additionally, he reportedly “put on 26kg, and a make-up artist gave him a false nose, tear ducts, wrinkles and even a false upper lip for the toothbrush moustache, a look that took two hours to apply, before he was sent out among the German public, accompanied by bodyguards in case he was attacked.”.

== Box office ==
The film was a box office success, reaching number one in Germany in its third week of release.

== Reception ==
Jörg Albrecht wrote on Deutschlandfunk that, as a media satire, the film could certainly hold its own with Schtonk!, but laughter could quickly fade when one realizes that "the German culture of welcome also applies to Adolf Hitler."

In the online edition of the Frankfurter Rundschau, Daniel Kothenschulte wrote that "At first it's not really funny, and then it's not painful enough", and the film squanders great documentary moments in favor of a bland media satire.

Michael Hanfeld on FAZ.NET described it as "the stupidest and most perfidious film to hit cinemas in a long time". He said that the film wants to be a satire, but in reality it is "an experimental arrangement and a pamphlet".

The German Film and Media Evaluation (FBW) awarded the film the rating "particularly valuable".

== Remake ==
The film was remade in Italy as Sono tornato (I'm Back) in 2018. The plot closely follows the German film except that it is Benito Mussolini rather than Hitler who magically reappears in the 21st century.

== See also ==
- The 1980 Spanish satirical film And in the Third Year, He Rose Again explores the resurrection of dictator Francisco Franco in 1978 during the Spanish transition to democracy.
