= Le grand secret =

- Genre: Drama, Mystery, Thriller, Science fiction
- Written by: André Cayatte
- Directed by: Jacques Trébouta
- Starring: Claude Rich; Louise Marleau; Peter Sattmann; Claude Jade; Fernando Rey; Paul Guers; Richard Münch
- Ending theme: Le grand secret, sung by Nana Mouskouri
- Composer: Serge Franklin
- Countries of origin: France; Canada; Germany; Spain
- Original language: French
- No. of episodes: 6

Production
- Cinematography: John Cabrera

Original release
- Release: 13 November 1989 – 1989

Le Grand Secret (The Great Secret/The Immortals) is a 1989 miniseries co-produced by France, Germany, Spain and Canada and directed by Jacques Trébouta. The screenplay by André Cayatte was based on the eponymous science fiction novel by René Barjavel, (Le grand secret). The production, starring Claude Rich, Louise Marleau, Peter Sattmann, Claude Jade and Fernando Rey, tells the story of a grand conspiracy between world leaders.

== Plot ==
Jeanne Corbet (Louise Marleau) is having an affair with Roland Fournier (Peter Sattmann), a researcher working on a cancer treatment in the Paris suburb of Villejuif. Married to Professor Paul Corbet (Fernando Rey), an older scientist who tolerates the affair, Jeanne is obsessed with her lover. During mysterious events controlled by the secret service, Roland disappears while Jeanne simultaneously experiences a kidnapping attempt. Samuel Frend (Claude Rich), an American secret agent based in France, comes in contact with Jeanne and informs her that her lover is not dead. Once convinced that Roland is alive, Jeanne devotes her life to searching the world for him.

In Caracas, she finds Frend and his wife Suzan (Claude Jade), but she loses track of the couple a few days later. The source of the cover-up of Roland's disappearance is revealed: Professor Bahanba (Richard Münch), an Indian scientist also working on a cancer treatment, has discovered JL3, an immortality serum that stops aging and eliminates vulnerability to disease in any living being.

A few years later, it is announced that Samuel Frend has died, but Jeanne does not believe that he was killed in an accident, as was reported. She visits Suzan, who now lives in Bennington (Vermont), and learns that the "widow" is a secret service officer. Jeanne learns that Samuel, now known as Colonel Bass, is on an island called 307, which is guarded day and night by the army. The island hosts a self-sufficient community led by Professor Bahanba, who also acts as the community's spiritual guide. Jeanne, now fifty years old, travels to the island and finds Roland, who is still a spirited young man of thirty. Their love is not what it once was and Jeanne finds herself unable to contract symptoms.

Throughout her search, Jeanne learns about numerous world leaders involved in the cover-up, including Indira Gandhi, Queen Elizabeth II and Ronald Reagan.

== Differences from the book ==
In Barjavel's novel, Jeanne's search takes 17 years and begins in 1955. Other world leaders are also involved in the conspiracy, including Jawaharlal Nehru and John F. Kennedy.

== Cast ==
- Louise Marleau as Jeanne Corbet
- Claude Rich as Samuel Frend
- Peter Sattmann as Roland Fournier
- Fernando Rey as Paul Corbet
- Claude Jade as Suzan Frend
- Paul Guers as William Garrett
- Richard Münch as Shri Bahanba
- Alain Mottet as Hamblain
- Leila Fréchet as Annie
- Martine Sarcey as Madame Fournier
- Annick Blancheteau as Lady Ogilvie
- Juan José Artero as Den
- Fernando Guillén Cuervo as Han
- Blanca Marsillach as Mary
- Michel Peyrelon as Poliot
- Sophie Renoir as Mrs. Banerjee
- Pierre Londiche as US ambassador in Paris
- Huguette Funfrock as Queen Elizabeth II
- Tatiana Mouroumzeff as Indira Gandhi
