= Wild Chicks =

Novel series by Cornelia Funke

The Wild Chicks (Die wilden Hühner) is a series of children's and youth books written by the German author Cornelia Funke. The main protagonists are four (later five) girls, who go to class together and form the eponymous "Wild Chicks" girl gang. Five books were published between 1993 and 2003, which have sold over one million copies in Germany. Three feature-length film adaptations have been released.

== Development ==
According to her own homepage, Funke's editor remarked in the early 1990s that Funke – who at that point had written children's fantasy books only – should consider writing non-fantastic fiction "without faeries, ghosts and pirates". Although reluctant to do so, Funke obliged and thought up the Wild Chicks, based on her own experiences with strong or quirky girls and women. She also declined writing adventures about "kids stopping bank robbers", and only wanted to write stories that "could happen to any child". Wild Chicks film producer Vivian Naefe noted the authenticity of the Wild Chicks universe, centering on girls of imperfect families (i.e. divorced, poor or dysfunctional parents), but still maintaining a level of humor which made the books appealing.

Book cover of Die Wilden Hühner, Fuchsalarm, 1998: From left to right: Wilma, Trude, Melanie, Frieda and Sprotte, art by Cornelia Funke

== Setting ==
The main protagonists are four – later five – girls: Sprotte (Charlotte), who is the spunky yet friendly main narrator, her best friend Frieda, a level-headed girl who is a member of Terre des hommes, shy and bespectacled Trude, who is insecure because of her chubbiness, and her best friend, the beautiful, opinionated, and vain, yet amicable Melanie. Later, they are joined by Wilma, a tough boys-hating nerd, who is later revealed as a lesbian. In the inaugural 1993 book Die Wilden Hühner, they are all eight to nine years old, and in the hitherto last book Die Wilden Hühner und die Liebe (2003), they are all 13 to 14 years old. All Wild Chicks wear a chicken's feather around their necks and have sworn to never kill or eat chicken.

In a 2007 interview, Funke said she identifies most with Sprotte, but wishes to have been more like Frieda. Asked why she made Wilma a lesbian, she answered: "I have friends who are lesbian, so this... is a normal part of life. It would have been boring... if Wilma had fallen in love with a boy, I already covered that with all the others." Funke also asserted that the main message of the fifth book, where all fall in love, is "tolerance and respect for the feelings of other people."

Throughout the entire series, the Wild Chicks encounter a boys' gang called the Pygmies (die Pygmäen): their leader is the self-confident, yet good natured Fred, small but cocky Torte, tough Willi (who is physically abused by his father), and the esoteric Steve, who is seldom seen without his tarot cards. On the author's homepage, she reveals that all Pygmies wear an earring as their trademark and have sworn to defend mankind versus "criminals, pirates, Nazis, cannibals and vicious teachers". At first, Wild Chicks and Pygmies form a boys-against-girls rivalry and play pranks on each other, but in later books, Sprotte / Fred, Melanie / Willi (latter temporarily), and Frieda / Torte become a couple.

Other regular characters in the series include Sprotte's chaotic but loving mother Sybille her on-and-off boyfriend Thorben Mossmann (whom Sprotte dislikes), Sprotte's cranky, fiercely independent grandmother Oma (Grandma) Slättberg, and Frau Rose (Ms. Rose), the Wild Chicks' (and the Pygmies') teacher.

Many of the series' protagonists come from dysfunctional families: Sprotte's mother Sybille is a single mother who works late hours as a taxi driver, Frieda's father constantly prefers her brothers, Trude's father has divorced her biological mother and is living with a woman Trude loathes, Melanie's parents are unemployed and poor, and Wilma's parents are rich but extremely demanding, complaining when she writes something worse than an "A". Willi's father is an alcoholic who constantly beats up his wife and son.

In 2009, German author Thomas Schmid wrote the novelisation of the third Wild Chicks film, Die wilden Hühner und das Leben. In this book, Schmid brings the Wild Chicks universe to a close. On a tumultuous school trip, both Wild Chicks and Pygmies realise they have outgrown their gang. They remain friends, and Sprotte recruits three young girls who take over their mantle as new Wild Chicks. Sprotte and Fred quarrel but remain a couple, Sprotte's mother becomes pregnant, Frieda hooks up with Willi and Trude with Steve. Torte's family emigrates to Denmark, Wilma comes out as lesbian and wants to become an actress, and Melanie decides to live her own life.

== Books ==
Starting in 1993, Funke has written five books about the Wild Chicks. They have appeared in German and in Polish (Egmont, 2006-2007). In a chat, Funke revealed that the books will be published in English in the future.

- Die Wilden Hühner, 1993 (Cecile-Dressler-Verlag, ISBN 3-7915-0445-2)
- Die Wilden Hühner auf Klassenfahrt, 1995 (Cecile-Dressler-Verlag, ISBN 3-7915-0481-9)
- Die Wilden Hühner, Fuchsalarm, 1998 (Cecile-Dressler-Verlag, ISBN 3-7915-0470-3)
- Die Wilden Hühner und das Glück der Erde, 2000 (Cecile-Dressler-Verlag, ISBN 3-7915-0483-5)
- Die Wilden Hühner und die Liebe, 2003 (Cecile-Dressler-Verlag, ISBN 978-3-7915-0472-8)

In 2008, German author Thomas Schmid wrote the novelisation of the third Wild Chicks film.

- Die Wilden Hühner und das Leben, 2008, (Cecile-Dressler-Verlag, ISBN 978-3-7915-1914-2)

In addition, Funke has published an activity book:

- Die Wilden Hühner. Das Bandenbuch zum Mitmachen, 2001 (Cecile-Dressler-Verlag, ISBN 978-3-7915-0460-5)

DVD cover of Wild Chicks in Love ("Die wilden Hühner und die Liebe"). From left to right: Trude (Zsá Zsá Ince Bürkle), Sprotte (Michelle von Treuberg), Frieda (Lucie Hollmann), Wilma (Jette Hering) and Melanie (Paula Riemann).

== Movies ==
Three films have been produced about the Wild Chicks: Wild Chicks (2006, Die Wilden Hühner), Wild Chicks in Love (2007, Die wilden Hühner und die Liebe), and The Wild Chicks and Life (2009, Die Wilden Hühner und das Leben), all directed by Vivian Naefe. Wild Chicks was a commercial success, drawing 1.15 million visitors into the cinemas, and won the "Younger Audience Award for Best Film" prize in Leeds. Paula Riemann, who portrayed Melanie, won the Undine Award (German film prize for teenage actors) for "best comedienne". The 2nd film, Wild Chicks in Love, was also a success, drawing about 1 million visitors in Germany. Funke herself was "very pleased" with the film adaptations.

In the three films, the main cast playing the Wild Chicks were:

- Sprotte - Michelle von Treuberg
- Frieda - Lucie Hollmann
- Trude - Zsá Zsá Inci Bürkle
- Melanie - Paula Riemann
- Wilma - Jette Hering

The Pygmies were portrayed by:

- Fred - Jeremy Mockridge
- Torte - Martin Kurz
- Willi - Vincent Redetzki
- Steve - Philip Wiegratz

The adult roles were portrayed by:

- Sybille - Veronica Ferres
- Ms. Rose - Jessica Schwarz
- Herr Grünbaum - Benno Fürmann
- Thorben Mossmann - Oliver Stokowski
- Sprotte's estranged father - Thomas Kretschmann
- Oma Slättberg - Doris Schade

Notable also was Svea Bein, who played Wilma's girlfriend Leonie.
