= Windstorm (film) =

- Film poster
- German: Ostwind
- Directed by: Katja von Garnier
- Music by: Annette Focks
- Distributed by: Constantin Film
- Release date: 21 March 2013
- Running time: 101 minutes
- Country: Germany
- Language: German

Windstorm (German: Ostwind) is a 2013 German adventure film about a horse named Windstorm (German: Ostwind) directed by Katja von Garnier. It is the first movie in a series about the titular horse. Windstorm was portrayed by three different horses.

== Cast ==
- Hanna Binke as Mika
- Marvin Linke as Sam
- Cornelia Froboess as Maria Kaltenbach
- Tilo Prückner as Herr Kaan
- Nina Kronjäger as Elisabeth Schwarz
- Jürgen Vogel as Philipp Schwarz
- Marla Menn as Michelle
- Henriette Morawe as Tinka
- Amber Bongard as Fanny
- Detlev Buck as veterinarian Dr. Anders
- Peter Meinhardt as Hesse state coach
- Martin Butzke as teacher
- Simone Henn as paramedic
- Neda Rahmanian as medical doctor
- Florentine Morawe as female stablehand 1
- Paula Heinemann as female stablehand 2
- Charline Grassnickeel as female stablehand 3
- Tim Dietrich as stablehand
- Sina Müller as little girl in tent camp

== Story ==
Mika, the granddaughter of a stable owner aids a horse who does not like being feared and distrusted by gaining the trust of the horse. In that process she learns horse riding in an unconventional way. And doing so saves the horse from getting sent to a slaughterhouse.

== Synopsis ==
Windstorm is the story of a rebellious teenage girl Mika, who, after accidentally setting fire to her teacher's car, gets sent to her grandmother's stable over the holidays, where she is supposed to learn discipline and order as punishment. Unexpectedly, though, she learns that she's not only a naturally talented rider, but also speaks the language of the horses. Windstorm is the direct descendant of the legendary mare Halla, who was known for carrying her hurt rider, Hans Günter Winkler, to victory at the 1956 Summer Olympics. Mika finds out she is the only one with the ability to ride and tame Windstorm, who is known to be a dangerous horse, and they share an unbreakable, almost magical bond from the start.

== Sequels ==
The film spawned several sequels:

- Ostwind 2, released in cinemas on 14 May 2015;
- Ostwind – Aufbruch nach Ora, released on 27 July 2017;
- Ostwind – Aris Ankunft, released on 28 February 2019;
- Ostwind – Der große Orkan, released online on 29 July 2021.

== See also ==
- List of films about horses
