= Das Rätsel der Sandbank =

- Based on: The Riddle of the Sands by Erskine Childers
- Screenplay by: Christoph Mattner
- Directed by: Rainer Boldt
- Starring: Burghart Klaußner; Peter Sattmann; Isabel Varell; Gunnar Möller
- Composer: Jens-Peter Ostendorf
- Country of origin: West Germany
- No. of seasons: 1
- No. of episodes: 10

Production
- Cinematography: Karl Kases
- Running time: 50 min.

Original release
- Network: Das Erste
- Release: 15 October 1985 – 1985

Das Rätsel der Sandbank is a West German television series based on the 1903 novel The Riddle of the Sands by Erskine Childers. It was produced by the public television and radio station Radio Bremen, and starring Burghart Klaußner as Davies and Peter Sattmann as Carruthers – the novel's two British yachtsmen and amateur spies.

The original novel, a sensational success at the time of publication, was one of the first signs heralding half a century of enmity and war between Britain and Germany, with the novel's British protagonists unearthing a German plot for the invasion of England and courageously striving to foil it.

== See also ==
- The Riddle of the Sands (1979 film with Michael York)
- List of German television series
