= Utta Danella =

German author

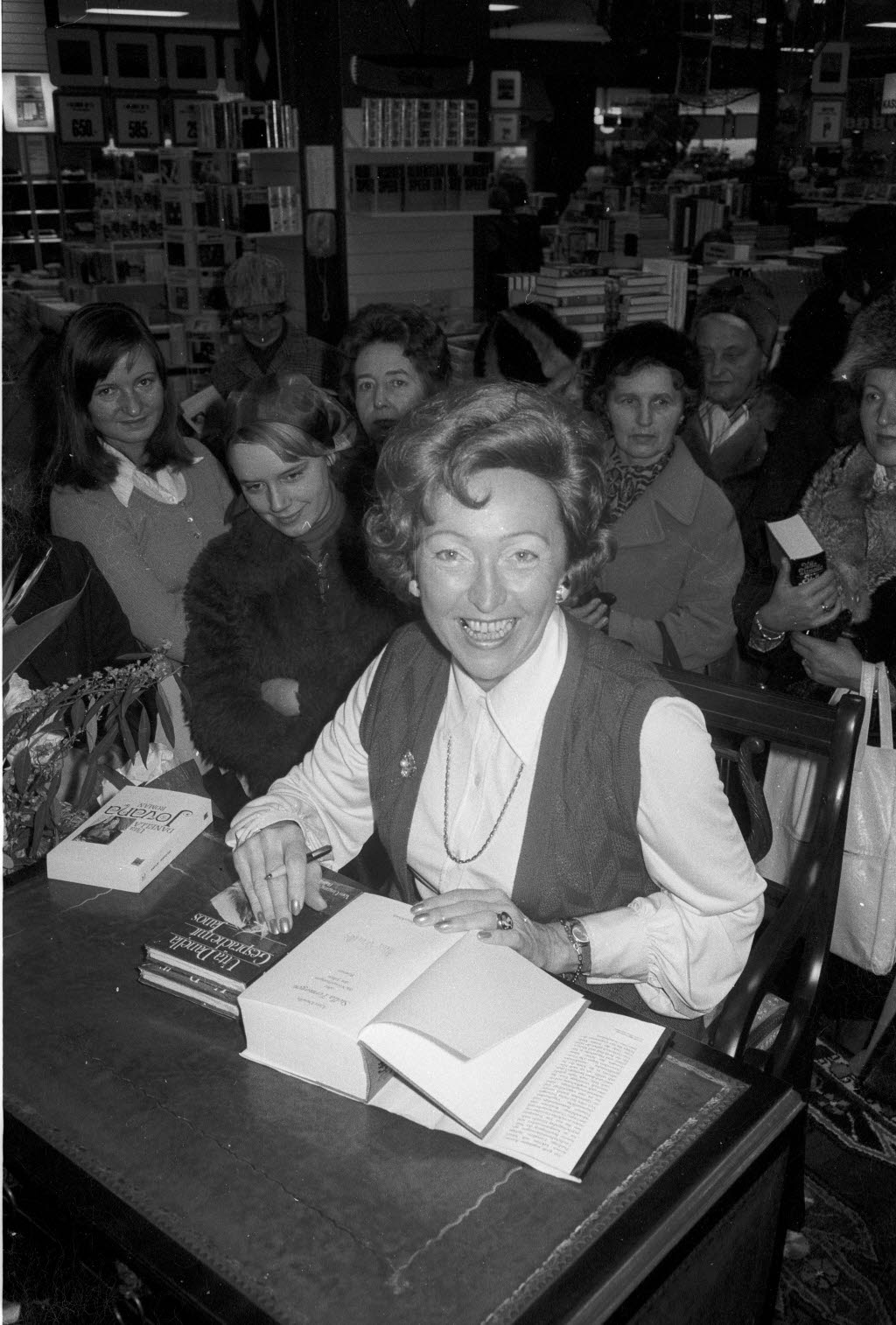
Utta Danella in 1975

Utta Danella, Utta Schneider, (18 June 1920 in Leipzig – July 2015 in Munich) was a German author.

== Life ==
Danella worked as a writer in Germany and was best known for her melodramatic books. She wrote over forty books in German and sold about 70 million books, making her one of Germany's commercially most successful authors. In 1950, Danella married Hermann Schneider. She lived in Munich. Many of her books were filmed by German broadcasters.

== Books ==
- Alle Sterne vom Himmel (1956)
- Regina auf den Stufen (1957)
- Die Frauen der Talliens (1958)
- Alles Töchter aus guter Familie (1958)
- Die Reise nach Venedig (1959)
- Stella Termogen oder Die Versuchungen der Jahre (1960)
- Der Maulbeerbaum (1964)
- Adieu, Jean Claude (1965)
- Der Mond im See (1965)
- Vergiß, wenn du leben willst (1966)
- Unter dem Zauberdach (1967)
- Quartett im September (1967)
- Jovana (1969)
- Niemandsland (1970)
- Tanz auf dem Regenbogen (1971)
- Der Schatten des Adlers (1971)
- Gestern oder Die Stunde nach Mitternacht (1971)
- Der blaue Vogel (1973)
- Die Hochzeit auf dem Lande (1975)
- Zwei Tage im April (1975)
- Der Sommer des glücklichen Narren (1976)
- Der dunkle Strom (1977)
- Die Tränen vom vergangenen Jahr (1978)
- Flutwelle (1980)
- Eine Heimat hat der Mensch (1981)
- Jacobs Frauen (1983); film 2004 as Das Familiengeheimnis
- Die Jungfrau im Lavendel (1984)
- Die Unbesiegte (1986)
- Der schwarze Spiegel (1987)
- Das Hotel im Park (1989)
- Meine Freundin Elaine (1990)
- Ein Bild von einem Mann (1992)
- Wo hohe Türme sind (1993)
- Wolkentanz (1996)
- Die andere Eva (1998)
- Der Kuss des Apollo (2006)
- Familiengeschichten (1979)
- Sophie Dorothee. Eine preußische Geschichte (1981); second edition 1997 as Sophie Dorothee und andere Geschichten
- Das verpasste Schiff. Die Geschichte einer turbulenten Traumreise (1986)
- Eine Liebe die nie vergeht. Begegnungen mit Musik (1988)

== Selected filmography ==
- Regina auf den Stufen (1992, TV miniseries)
