= Der Prins muß her =

- Starring: Peter Sattmann
- Country of origin: Germany

Der Prins muß her is a German television series.

== See also ==
- List of German television series
