= Paula Riemann =

German filmmaker and choreographer

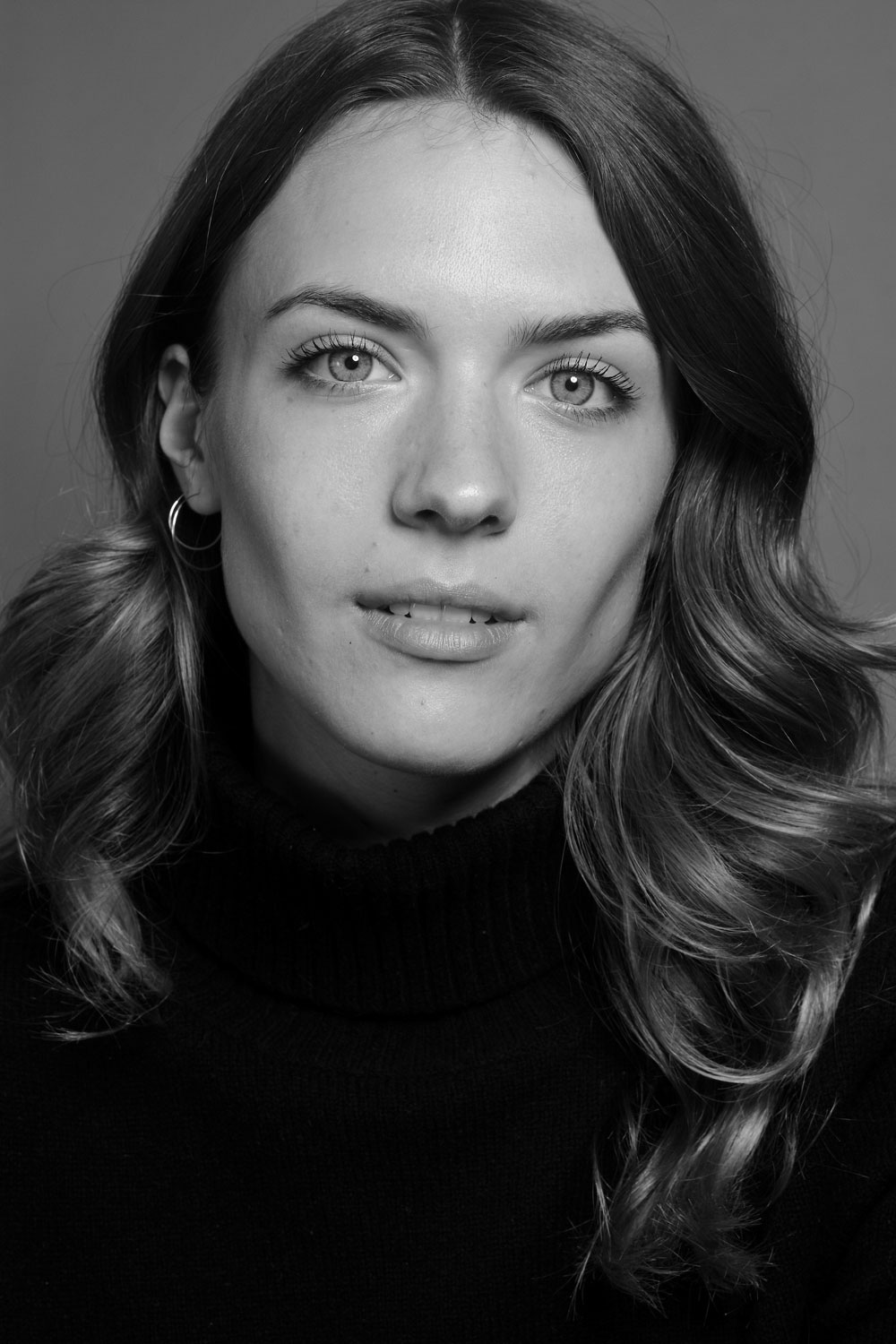
- Riemann in 2018
- Born: 3 August 1993 (age 33); Berlin, Germany
- Other name: Paula Romy
- Occupations: Filmmaker, choreographer
- Height: 175 cm (5 ft 9 in)

Paula Riemann (born 3 August 1993), also known as Paula Romy, is a German filmmaker and choreographer from Berlin, living in London.

== Biography ==
Both of Riemann's parents, Katja Riemann and Peter Sattmann, are actors.

Riemann moved to London in 2010 where she trained as a dancer at the Urdang Academy. She graduated from Queen Mary University with a degree in Business Management, and then went on to study Filmmaking at the London Metropolitan University's film school. She writes, directs and produces films, music videos and commercials.

Riemann is also known as an actress for Marco Kreuzpaintner's comedy Coming In (2014) playing the model Maja, and for the role of Melanie in German kids movies trilogy Wild Chicks (2006–2007) for which she was awarded the Undine Award for Best Young Comedian.

== Filmography ==
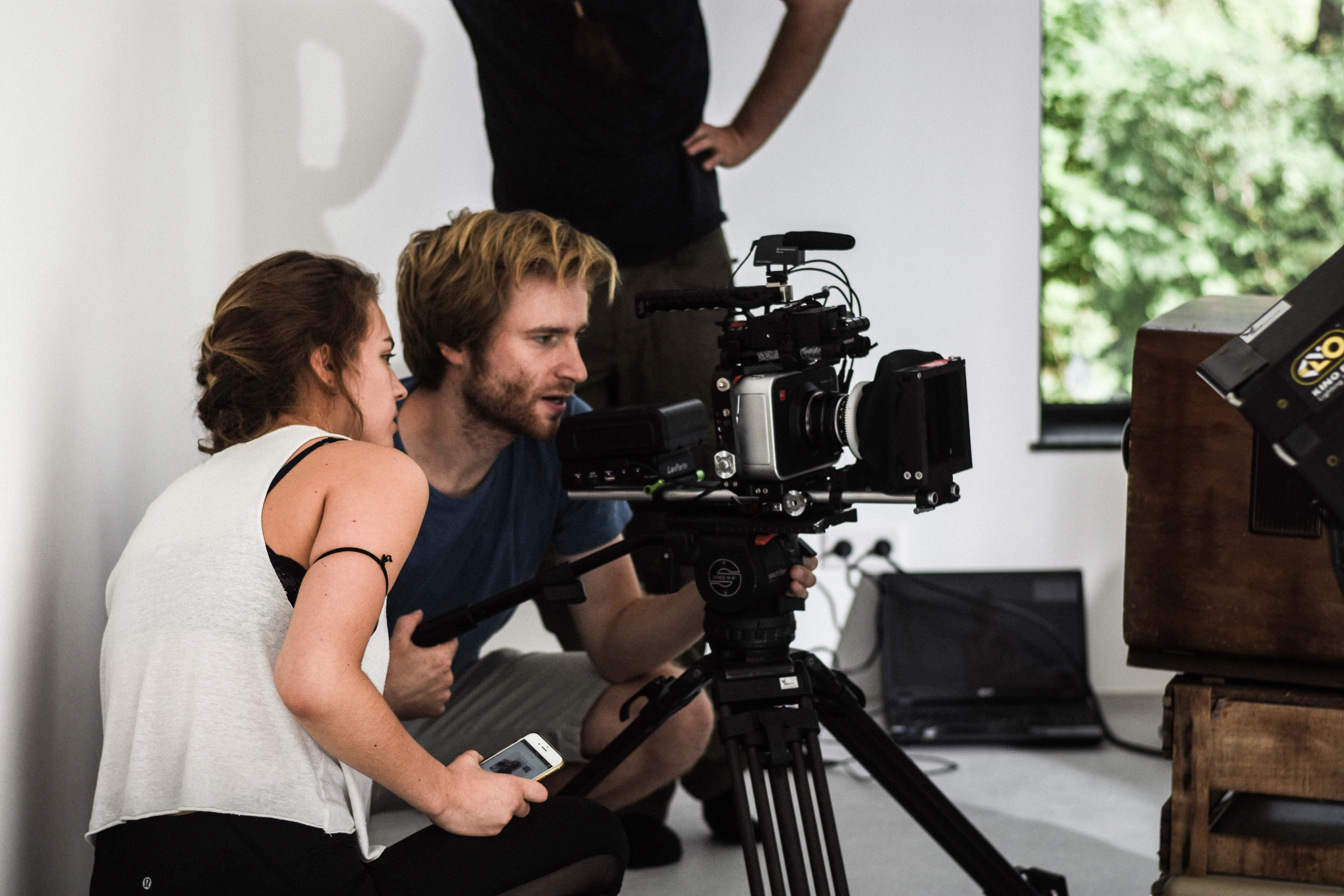
Paula on set of 'Puppet On A String' with cinematographer Marcus Lauterbach

Her first short film Ella (2015) won honourable mention from the jury at the International Film Festival Manhattan. Her second short film BiNARY (2016) had its world premiere at the London Independent Film Festival and then continued its international festival circuit.

Subsequently Riemann was commissioned to make her first music video for Jasmin Tabatabai's song "Puppet on a String". The video told the story of a love-triangle through dance, which Riemann also choreographed.

Most recently, Riemann produced a new short film Our Kind Of Love (2018) that deals with the topic of arranged marriage.
