= Gstaad Palace =

Hotel in Gstaad, Switzerland

Coordinates: 46.4731462°N 7.2844935°E

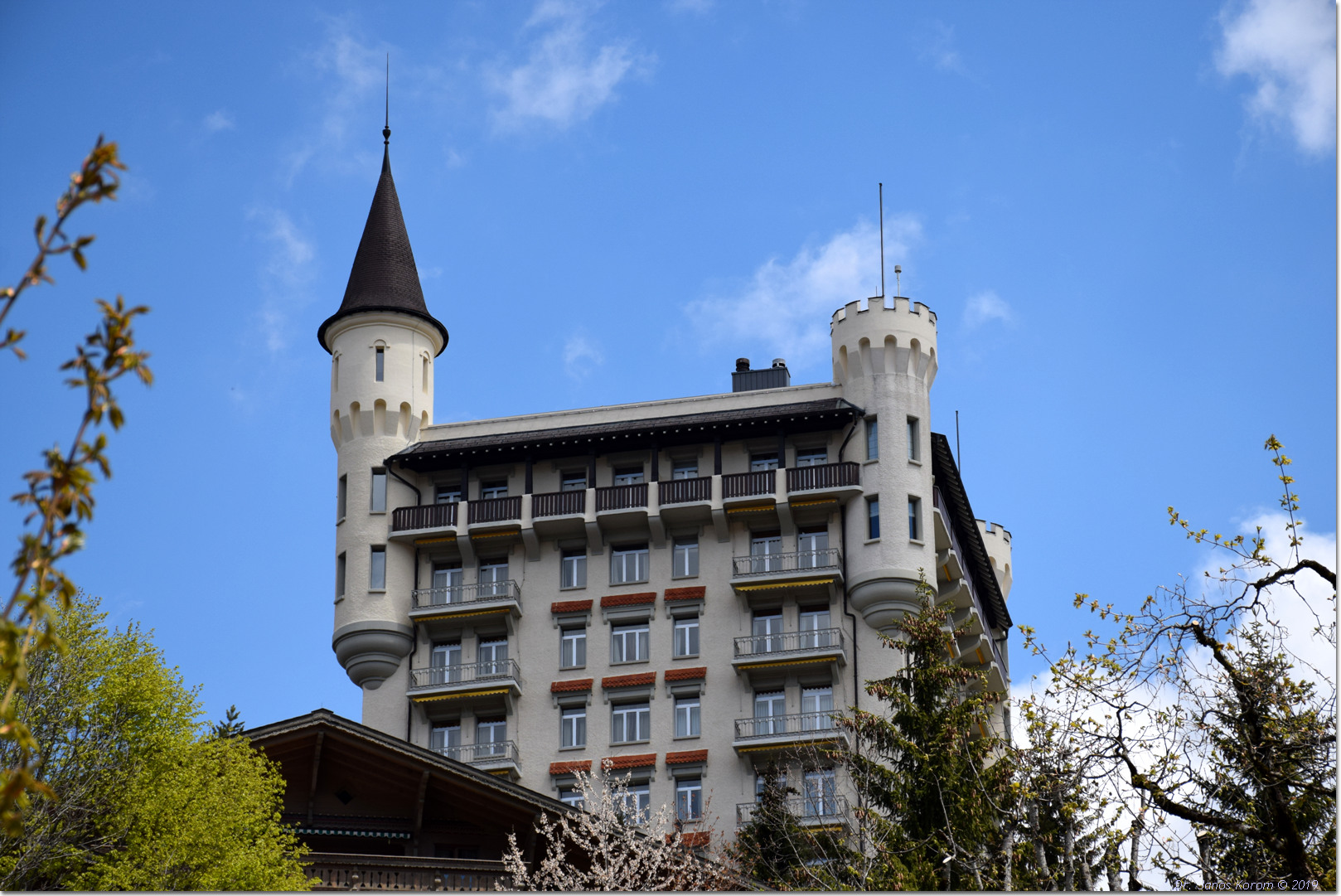
- Interactive map of the Gstaad Palace area

General information
- Type: Luxury hotel
- Architectural style: Châteauesque; Swiss chalet style
- Location: Gstaad, Switzerland
- Opened: December 1913
- Owner: Scherz family
- Affiliation: The Leading Hotels of the World

Design and construction
- Architect: Adrien van Dorsser

Website
- www.palace.ch

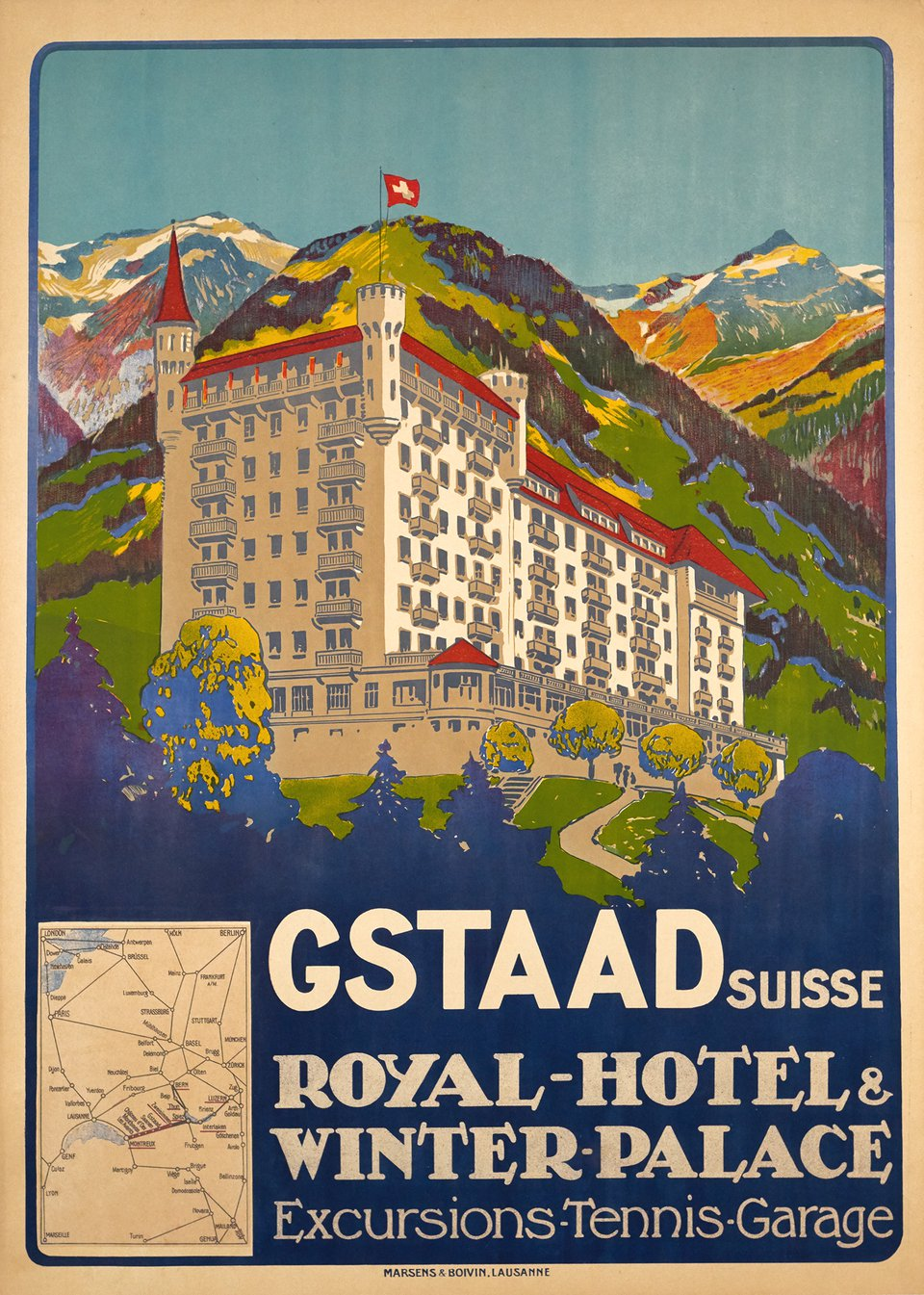
Advertising poster from 1913

The Gstaad Palace is a luxury hotel in Gstaad, Switzerland. It was opened in December 1913 and is a destination for various celebrities and politicians. It is a member of The Leading Hotels of the World, a hotel marketing organization.

== History ==
In 1905, Robert Steffen, a local schoolteacher in Gstaad, purchased land on which to build a new hotel. He recruited investors from Lausanne and Geneva for the project originally called the "Royal-Hôtel and Winter Palace." The hotel was opened in December 1913, with a design from Dutch architect, Adrien van Dorsser. In 1915, it held a men's tennis tournament on outdoor clay courts. The tournament would eventually become the Swiss Open. Soon after the hotel's inauguration, World War I broke out in Europe, inhibiting the Palace's success at first. It saw growth in the 1920s but was again hampered by the Great Depression. Ernst and Sylvia Scherz took over as directors of the hotel in 1938. During World War II, a vault in the hotel's cellar was used to safeguard money and other valuables held by the Swiss Bank Corporation (now known as UBS). That vault is currently a fondue restaurant named La Fromagerie. The Gstaad "Schweizerhof" Command Bunker (A1689) is a separate military installation in the mountain behind the hotel. The bunker, known by the cover name "Schweizerhof, served as asecret Swiss Army command post and has no direct connection to the hotel's gold vault. It was part of the Swiss National Redoubt (Réduit) defence system.

Financial struggles associated with low patronage during the war prompted the hotel's majority owner to sell in 1947. The Scherz family raised the capital to acquire the entirety of shares, approximately $120,000 (about $3 million in modern equivalency), and contineously owned it ever since. After the war, the hotel became a common vacation spot for royalty, including King Leopold III, the King of Afghanistan, and members of the Spanish royal family. In the 1950s, Scherz helped establish events like the Menuhin Festival Gstaad to increase business at the hotel.

The following decade, he brought in prominent entertainers to perform at the hotel, including Maurice Chevalier, Louis Armstrong, Ella Fitzgerald, Marlene Dietrich, and numerous others. Scherz's son, Ernst Andrea, took over managing duties from his father in 1968. Throughout the 1960s and 70s, the hotel gained a reputation as a celebrity getaway destination. Actors like Elizabeth Taylor, Richard Burton, Sophia Loren, Grace Kelly, Roger Moore, and many others spent a great deal of time there. In the early 1970s, the hotel opened its first nightclub, GreenGo. Exterior shots of the hotel appear in the 1975 film, The Return of the Pink Panther, with Peter Sellers in his role as Inspector Clouseau.

In 2000, Michael Jackson offered to purchase the hotel, but the owners declined. In 2001, Ernst Andrea Scherz handed over management duties to his son, Andrea Scherz. The hotel also added a spa to include sauna and hammam areas. In 2013 and 2014, the sixth floor suites were refurbished. It received a renovation in 2018 which incorporated more suites at the property. One of the most notable recent developments was the complete renovation of the hotel's main restaurant in 2025. Reopened under the name Le Grand Restaurant, the redesigned space combines timeless elegance with contemporary design while celebrating classic table-side service traditions. This renovation was part of a multi-million Swiss franc investment programme aimed at ensuring the Palace remains one of Europe's leading luxury hotels with the owner Andrea Scherz being the chairman of the organization The Leading Hotels of the World. In the summer of 2026, the hotel expanded its culinary offerings with a fifth restaurant, Gildo's al Fresco, dedicated to Mediterranean cuisine and named after its former maître d'hôtel, Gildo.

In April 2022, Roman Polanski began shooting the film The Palace in the hotel. In 2026, the Gstaad palace gained even greater international attention through the four-part SRF documentary series "Inside Gstaad Palace - Luxury and Tradition in the Iconic Hotel". The series offered viewers an exclusive behind-the-scenes look at the daily operation of the hotel, following more than 300 employees throughout a busy winter season. Culinary Director Franz W. Faeh retired after the 2026 summer season and was succeeded by Luca Gatti, who had worked at the palace for two decades.

== Description ==
The Gstaad Palace was built in a Swiss chalet style on a hill overlooking the town of Gstaad. It has guest rooms and suites, restaurants, a basement nightclub (GreenGo), a spa, a traditional alpine hut (Walig Hut), indoor and outdoor pools, and numerous other amenities. It is a member of the independent hotel collective known as The Leading Hotels of the World.

In the mountain behind the hotel the Kommandoposten Gstaad Schweizerhof, the secret bunker complex of Swiss Armed Forces headquarters.

== See also ==
- List of hotels in Switzerland
- Tourism in Switzerland
