= Regina auf den Stufen =

- Starring: Katja Riemann
- Country of origin: Germany

Original release
- Release: 7 January – 10 March 1992

Regina auf den Stufen is a German television series, based on a 1957 novel by Utta Danella.

== See also ==
- List of German television series
