= The Feds (miniseries) =

The Feds is a series of Australian television films starring Robert Taylor, which were first broadcast on the Nine Network 1993–1996.

The Feds revolves around the activities of the Australian Federal Police, who protect the national interests from crime in Australia and overseas. Nine telemovies were produced in the series.

== Regular cast ==
- Robert Taylor as Superintendent Dave Griffin
- Angie Milliken as Detective Sergeant Jo Moody
- John Bach as Commander Rainer Bass
- Brian Vriends as Michael Skinner
- Nell Feeney-Connor as Rose Dell'oro
- Marcus Eyre as Blocker
- Amanda Jane Bowden as Tina McLean
- Zoe Bertram as Sarah Griffin
- Benjamin Keatch as Brett Griffin

== The Feds (pilot) ==
The Feds
- Directed by: David Caesar
- Written by: John Reeves; Vince Moran
- Produced by: Jan Marnell
- Cinematography: Joseph Pickering
- Edited by: Bill Murphy
- Music by: Bruce Rowland
- Release date: 20 September 1993
- Running time: 100 minutes
- Country: Australia

A barrister and a brain surgeon suspected of fraud are tracked down by the Feds.

The film was shot 1 March - 2 April 1993 on location in Melbourne, Canberra and Hong Kong.

=== Guests ===
- Sigrid Thornton as Christine McQuillan
- Bruno Lawrence as Larry 'Icehouse' Porter
- Nicki Wendt as Melita Reale
- Rachel Griffiths as Angela Braglia

== The Feds: Terror ==
Terror
- Directed by: Donald Crombie
- Written by: Graeme Farmer; Ian McFadyen
- Produced by: Jan Marnell
- Cinematography: David Foreman
- Music by: Nerida Tyson-Chew; Bruce Rowland (title theme)
- Release date: 30 August 1995
- Running time: 100 minutes
- Country: Australia

=== Guests ===
- Max Tidof as Jurgen Dietermann
- Colin Moody as Hans Holder
- Erica Peril as Karen Siddeley
- Paul Caesar as Eric King
- Bruce Barry as Stanley Hickock
- Nicholas Hammond as Milton

== The Feds: Obsession ==
Obsession
- Directed by: Donald Crombie
- Written by: Jan Sardi
- Produced by: Jan Marnell
- Cinematography: David Foreman
- Edited by: Bill Murphy
- Music by: Nerida Tyson-Chew; Bruce Rowland (title theme)
- Release date: 12 October 1994
- Running time: 91 minutes
- Country: Australia

=== Guests ===
- Jerome Ehlers as Cal Woods
- Denis Moore as Justice Fairweather
- John Jacobs as Phil O'Leary
- Stephen Whittaker as Glen Warrender

== The Feds: Abduction ==
Abduction
- Directed by: Michael Pattinson
- Written by: Vince Moran; Graeme Farmer
- Produced by: Jan Marnell
- Cinematography: David Foreman
- Edited by: Neil Thumpston
- Music by: Nerida Tyson-Chew; Bruce Rowland (title theme)
- Release date: 7 June 1995
- Running time: 87 minutes
- Country: Australia

=== Guests ===
- John McTernan as Alan Guinnane
- Anne Tenney as Suzi Plummer
- Lani John Tupu as Idris Karya
- Jackie Kelleher as Sarminah

== The Feds: Seduction ==
Seduction
- Directed by: George Ogilvie
- Written by: Everett de Roche
- Produced by: Jan Marnell
- Cinematography: Roger Dowling
- Edited by: Denise Haratzis
- Music by: Nerida Tyson-Chew; Bruce Rowland (title theme)
- Release date: 5 July 1995
- Running time: 90 minutes
- Country: Australia

=== Guests ===
- Peta Toppano as Brandy
- Petru Gheorghiu as Mendosa
- Jonathan Elsom as Justin
- Peter McCauley as Chad
- Carlos Sanchez as Lopez
- Richard Moss as Senator North
- Alberto Vila as Julio Blanco

== The Feds: Suspect ==
Suspect
- Directed by: Michael Pattinson
- Written by: Jan Sardi
- Produced by: Jan Marnell
- Cinematography: Roger Dowling
- Edited by: Neil Thumpston
- Music by: Nerida Tyson-Chew; Bruce Rowland (title theme)
- Release date: 22 February 1995
- Running time: 85 minutes
- Country: Australia

=== Guests ===
- Susie Edmonds as Chief Inspector Beckwith
- Paul Sonkkila as Commander Rock
- John Higginson as Superintendent Pappas
- Kevin Summers as Sen Sgt Del Re
- Mark Neal as Det Const Barnes
- Shannon McNamara as Niki Webster
- Andrew Blackman as Ponytail

== The Feds: Deception ==
Deception
- Directed by: George Ogilvie
- Written by: Graeme Farmer; John Reeves
- Produced by: Jan Marnell
- Cinematography: David Foreman
- Edited by: Denise Haratzis
- Music by: Nerida Tyson-Chew; Bruce Rowland (title theme)
- Release date: 15 March 1995
- Running time: 95 minutes
- Country: Australia

=== Guests ===
- Rachael Beck as Judy Taylor
- Nadine Garner as Tammy Warren
- Daniel Lapaine as Tony Waterman
- Nicholas Bell as Stephen Garrard
- Stephen Whittaker as Glen C Warrender
- Teo Gebert as Jak Waterman

== The Feds: Vengeance ==
Vengeance
- Directed by: Michael Offer
- Written by: Tony McDonald
- Produced by: Jan Marnell
- Cinematography: David Foreman
- Edited by: Bill Murphy
- Music by: Nerida Tyson-Chew; Bruce Rowland (title theme)
- Release date: 29 November 1995
- Running time: 94 minutes
- Country: Australia

=== Guests ===
- John Stanton as John Dyer
- Lisa Hensley as Annie Fleming
- Steven Vidler as Ed Bishop
- Frances O'Connor as Arianna
- Fiona Spence as Lisa

== The Feds: Deadfall ==
Deadfall
- Directed by: Donald Crombie
- Written by: Tony McDonald; Alison Nisselle
- Produced by: Jan Mernell
- Cinematography: David Foreman
- Edited by: Neil Thumpston
- Music by: Nerida Tyson-Chew; Bruce Rowland (title theme)
- Release date: 23 October 1996
- Running time: 91 minutes
- Country: Australia

=== Guests ===
- Martin Jacobs as Gerry Lehman
- Simon Bossell as Gil McPherson
- Max Tidof as Hauptkommissar Jurgen Dietermann
- Belinda McClory as Pauline
- Asher Keddie as Susan Lehman

== The Feds: Betrayal ==
Betrayal
- Directed by: Chris Thomson
- Written by: Alison Nisselle
- Produced by: Jan Marnell
- Cinematography: Roger Dowling
- Edited by: Denise Haratzis
- Music by: Nerida Tyson-Chew; Bruce Rowland (title theme)
- Release date: 24 July 1996
- Running time: 91 minutes
- Country: Australia

=== Guests ===
- Peter Phelps as Brian Petrie
- Tammy MacIntosh as Nicky Bass
- Chris Haywood as Daniel "Mac" McIntyre
- Max Tidof as Hauptkommissar Jurgen Dietermann
- Peter Hosking as Assist. Commissioner Roland Cloke
