= The Immortals (Barjavel novel) =

1973 novel by René Barjavel

- First edition
- Author: René Barjavel
- Original title: Le Grand Secret
- Translator: Eileen Finletter
- Language: French, English
- Publisher: Presses de la Cité
- Publication date: 1973
- Publication place: France
- English publication date: 1974
- Pages: 344

The Immortals (French: Le Grand secret) is a 1973 novel by the French writer René Barjavel. It tells the story of a grand conspiracy between world leaders. It was published in English in 1974, translated by Eileen Finletter.

The book received the Prix Maison de la Presse. It was adapted into the 1989 television serial Le grand secret, directed by Jacques Trébouta.
