= Making Up! =

1993 film

Abgeschminkt!
- Directed by: Katja von Garnier
- Written by: Katja von Garnier; Hannes Jaenicke
- Produced by: Katja von Garnier; Ewa Karlström
- Starring: Katja Riemann; Max Tidof; Gedeon Burkhard; Nina Kronjäger
- Cinematography: Torsten Breuer
- Edited by: Katja von Garnier
- Music by: Tillman Höhn
- Release date: 1 July 1993
- Running time: 55 minutes
- Country: Germany
- Language: German

Abgeschminkt! (English: Making Up!) is a German film directed by Katja von Garnier and written by Katja von Garnier and Hannes Jaenicke. It was released in 1993.

== Premise ==
Cartoonist Frenzy battles writer’s block by drawing inspiration from her romance-obsessed friend Maischa’s love escapades.

== Cast ==
- Katja Riemann - Frenzy
- Nina Kronjäger - Maischa
- Gedeon Burkhard - Rene
- Max Tidof - Mark
- Daniela Amavia - Susa (as Daniela Lunkewitz)
- Peter Sattmann - Schwarz
- Jochen Nickel - Party Tier (Party Animal)
- Carola Höhne - Renes Schwester (Rene's Sister)
