= Enfant Terrible (film) =

2020 film

- Film poster
- Directed by: Oskar Roehler
- Written by: Klaus Richter
- Produced by: Markus Zimmer
- Starring: Oliver Masucci; Hary Prinz; Katja Riemann; Jochen Schropp; Erdal Yıldız; Markus Hering; Frida-Lovisa Hamann; André Hennicke; Christian Berkel; Eva Mattes; Alexander Scheer
- Cinematography: Carl-Friedrich Koschnick
- Edited by: Hansjörg Weißbrich
- Music by: Martin Todsharow
- Release date: 1 October 2020
- Running time: 134 minutes
- Country: Germany
- Language: German

Enfant Terrible is a 2020 German drama film directed by Oskar Roehler about the German film director Rainer Werner Fassbinder. It was selected to be shown at the 2020 Cannes Film Festival.

== Cast ==
- Oliver Masucci as Rainer Werner Fassbinder
- Hary Prinz as Kurt Raab
- Katja Riemann as Gudrun
- Jochen Schropp as Armin Meier
- Erdal Yıldız as El Hedi ben Salem
- Markus Hering as Peer Raben
- Frida-Lovisa Hamann as Martha
- André Hennicke as Volker Spengler
- Christian Berkel as Interviewer
- Eva Mattes as Brigitte Mira
- Alexander Scheer as Andy Warhol
- Désirée Nick as Barbara Valentin
- Götz Otto as Jack Palance
- Detlef Bothe as Wally Brockmeyer
- Sunnyi Melles as Rosel Zech
- Michael Klammer as Günther Kaufmann
- Anton Rattinger as Britta
- Lucas Gregorowicz as Ulli Lommel
- Felix Hellmann as Harry Baer
- Simon Böer as Michael Ballhaus
