= Oliver Masucci =

German actor (born 1968)

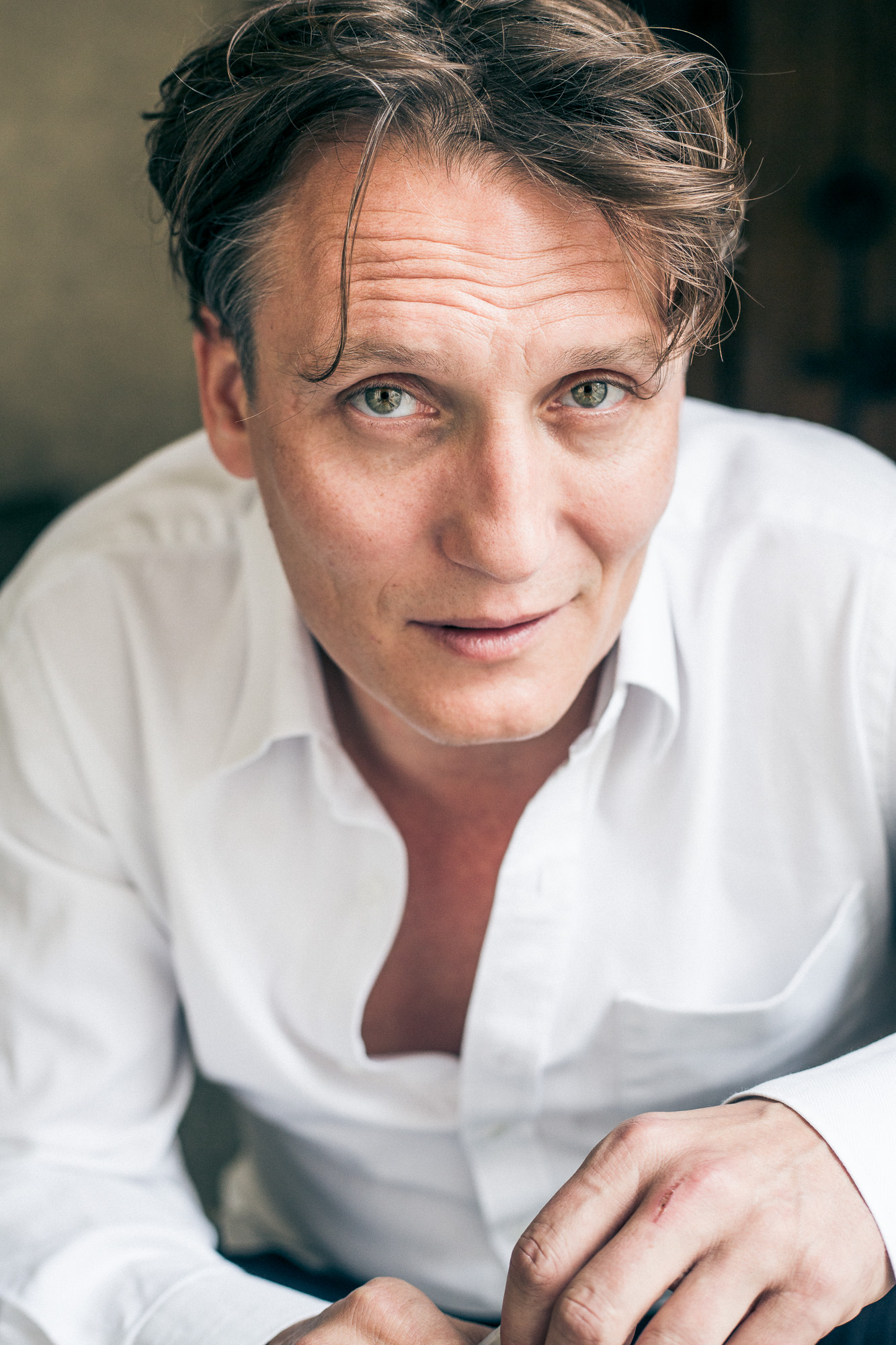
- Masucci in 2014
- Born: 6 December 1968 (age 57); Stuttgart, West Germany
- Education: Berlin University of the Arts (1990–1994)
- Years active: 1992–present
- Children: 3

Oliver Masucci (pronounced [maˈsutʃi], born 6 December 1968) is a German actor. He is best known internationally for the role of Adolf Hitler in the 2015 film adaptation of the satirical novel Look Who's Back, Ulrich Nielsen in the Netflix series Dark, and Anton Vogel in Fantastic Beasts: The Secrets of Dumbledore.

== Early life ==
He was born in Stuttgart, but raised in Bonn. His father is Italian, and his mother is German. The family ran several restaurants in Bonn. He has three children.

== Career ==
Masucci played Adolf Hitler in Er ist wieder da (Look Who's Back), adapted from the book of the same name. Some scenes were unscripted and consisted of filming the reactions of people on the street to Masucci as he traveled the country dressed up as Hitler. Masucci was surprised to find that many people acted as if they were glad to see the Nazi leader. He has used the opportunity to speak out against racism. The role earned him a nomination as best actor in a leading role at the Deutscher Filmpreis in 2016.

Masucci gained international recognition for his role as Ulrich Nielsen on Netflix’s German language time travel show Dark. He said ‘For the world, of course, I became famous with Dark. And that was pretty nice, because I have friends everywhere now. When I go to Rome, I get treated very well in the restaurants, and I get treated very well on the streets in New York. No one’s screaming and shouting, and I hope it will never be that way, because for the moment, this is quite nice.'

Masucci portrayed German film director Rainer Werner Fassbinder in the 2020 film Enfant Terrible directed by Oskar Roehler.

In 2023, Masucci starred, as the hotel manager, in the film The Palace by Roman Polanski.

== Filmography ==
Year	Title	Role	Notes
1992	Andy	Andy	
1999	Schwarz greift ein – Schlag auf Schlag	Ricky Ohlsen	
2001	Die Manns – Ein Jahrhundertroman	Lohengrin	
2002	Madrid	Karl	
2002	The Red Jacket	Bavarian Soldier	
2003	Wir können alles. Außer Hollywood: Independent Days Vol. 01.		
2004	Blood of the Templars	Ares de Saintclair	
2005	Cologne P.D. – Santa Mortale	Daniel Rosi	
2005	SK Kölsch	Johann Hinkel	
2006	Crocodile Alert	Killiak	
2009	Volcano	Gernot	
2011	Was ihr wollt	Antonio	
2015	Look Who's Back	Adolf Hitler	
2015	Berlin One	Victor Parkov	
2016	Die vierte Gewalt	Tobias Weishaupt	
2016	Tatort: Zahltag	Luan Berisha	
2016	Winnetou	Ugly Joe	
2017	4 Blocks	Hagen Kutscha	
2017	Dark	Ulrich Nielsen	
2018	Dengler: Fremde Wasser		
2018	Spielmacher	Dejans	
2018	Herrliche Zeiten	Claus Müller-Todt	
2018	Never Look Away	Professor Antonius van Verten	
2018	Lysis	Father	
2019	When Hitler Stole Pink Rabbit	Arthur Kemper	
2020	Enfant Terrible	Rainer Werner Fassbinder	
2021	Tribes of Europa	Moses	
2021	The Girlfriend Experience	Georges Verhoeven	
2021	Die Schachnovelle	Dr. Josef Bartok	
2022	Fantastic Beasts: The Secrets of Dumbledore	Anton Vogel	
2022	Day Shift	Klaus	
2023	The Swarm	Capt. Jasper Alban	
2023	The Palace	Hansueli Kopf	
2024	Herrhausen: The Banker and the Bomb (de:Herrhausen – Der Herr des Geldes	Alfred Herrhausen)	
2025	The German (de:The German)	Uri Zahavi	
