= Bavarian Film Awards (Special Prize) =

This is a list of the winners of the Bavarian Film Awards Special Award.

- 1986 Willy Bogner
- 1988 Vicco von Bülow
- 1990 Dieter Geissler and all of his German Coworkers
- 1991 Heinz Badewitz
- 1996 Wolfgang Panzer
- 1997 Ben Becker, Heino Ferch, Ulrich Noethen, Heinrich Schafmeister, Max Tidof, Kai Wiesinger
- 2001 Michael "Bully" Herbig
- 2005 Christian Wagner
- 2006 Joseph Vilsmaier & Dana Vávrová
- 2007 Veit Helmer
