= The Palace (2023 film) =

2023 film by Roman Polanski

- Theatrical release poster
- Directed by: Roman Polanski
- Written by: Jerzy Skolimowski; Ewa Piaskowska; Roman Polanski
- Produced by: Luca Barbareschi; Wojciech Gostomczyk; Jean-Louis Porchet
- Starring: Oliver Masucci; Fanny Ardant; John Cleese; Bronwyn James; Joaquim de Almeida; Luca Barbareschi; Milan Peschel; Fortunato Cerlino; Mickey Rourke
- Cinematography: Paweł Edelman
- Edited by: Hervé de Luze
- Music by: Alexandre Desplat
- Production companies: Eliseo Entertainment; Rai Cinema; CAB Productions; Lucky Bob; RP Productions; Agent Double
- Distributed by: 01 Distribution (Italy); Next Film (Poland); Swashbuckler Films (France)
- Release dates: 2 September 2023 (Venice); 28 September 2023 (Italy); 3 November 2023 (Poland); 15 May 2024 (France)
- Running time: 100 minutes
- Countries: Italy; Switzerland; Poland; France
- Language: English
- Budget: €17 million
- Box office: $972,161

The Palace is a 2023 black comedy film directed by Roman Polanski, who co-wrote the screenplay with Jerzy Skolimowski and Ewa Piaskowska. The film stars Oliver Masucci, Fanny Ardant, John Cleese, Bronwyn James, Joaquim de Almeida, Luca Barbareschi, Milan Peschel, Fortunato Cerlino, and Mickey Rourke. It chronicles the mishaps of a 1999 New Year's Eve dinner party in the Gstaad Palace, from a penguin going loose in the hotel to the exploitation of the millennium bug for a guest's financial gain.

The film had its world premiere at the 80th Venice International Film Festival on 2 September 2023, before it was released theatrically in Italy on 28 September 2023 by 01 Distribution. The film's release and promotion were impacted by the sexual abuse controversies surrounding Polanski. It received negative reviews from critics and became a box-office bomb, grossing $972,161 worldwide against a production budget of €17 million.

== Plot ==
On New Year's Eve 1999 at Gstaad Palace, hotel director Director Hansueli Kopf and his staff prepare a party for wealthy guests. The guests include Bongo, a former Italian porn star whose career has stalled; Dr. Lima, a plastic surgeon whose work is visible on several guests, faces, and his wife, who has suffering from Alzheimer's disease; the Marquise de la Valle, an elderly noblewoman devoted to her dog; Arthur William Dallas III, a tycoon in his nineties who is celebrating his first wedding anniversary with Magnolia, seventy years his junior; and Bill Crush, a businessman who claims to be wealthy but has financial difficulties.

While preparations are underway, a group of Russian guests arrive at the hotel led by the ambiguous Anton, who asks Hansueli to keep some suitcases with mysterious contents in the hotel's vault, which has long been disused: the only key is given to Anton. Shortly afterwards, the Russians witnessed the resignation live on TV of Boris Yeltsin and the handover of power to Vladimir Putin.

There are many chaotic misadventures that precede the big evening party, which Hansueli must remedy with his enviable aplomb. Meanwhile, Bill Crush tries to take advantage of the Y2K bug to dramatically increase his now meagre wealth, using the seraphic banker Caspar Tell: in exchange for his help, Crush offers Tell a large bribe that will lead the modest and repressed employee to become rich and change his life. Crush's plan, however, is called into question by the sudden arrival of a Czech man who claims to be his secret son, along with his entire family: Crush denies that the man could be his son and refuses to meet them. As a result, Hansueli is forced to host them in various areas of the hotel, away from prying eyes.

Meanwhile, the Marquise has a problem with her dog, in whose excrement she believes she sees confirmation of her fears about the end of the world; Doctor Lima's intervention (which will later also be requested by Bongo, who breaks his nose while skiing) reveals that the little dog, used to eating caviar, only has a banal parasitosis, which the surgeon fears the woman is also affected by. The Marquise will console herself with the services of a handsome Polish plumber.

Dallas and Magnolia celebrate their anniversary with eccentric celebrations that even include the presence of a real penguin: their relationship, in reality, is the subject of gossip due to the notable age difference between the two. When Dallas dies during a frantic sexual encounter, Magnolia asks for Hansueli's help: due to a legal technicality, the girl will only be able to inherit Dallas' huge fortune after midnight, at the end of an effective year of marriage. The director will therefore try to postdate the tycoon's death by a few hours, using rather bizarre methods.

Shortly after the start of the party, the Russian ambassador arrives and reveals to Anton that with the new political situation in the country, the money hidden in the briefcases must disappear, and can therefore be divided among all the Russians guests. Meanwhile, Tell, invited to the party by Crush, has second thoughts that call their plan into question: when the banker inadvertently takes marijuana offered to him by the Russian girls following Anton, he lets go of his inhibitions and starts spending the money which he still doesn't have in very expensive champagne. Crush, having found a debt of over $12,000 in his account, sets off in a furious search for his accomplice, lost among the other guests, but suffers a heart attack: he is rescued by Hansueli and Crush's alleged son.

At the end of the party, the Russian ambassador and Anton go to the vault to divide the money, but Anton inadvertently locks the other one inside together with the only key. When he goes to Hansueli to ask for help, the director, exhausted from dealing with other people's problems all day, orders him to take care of it himself.

== Cast ==
- Oliver Masucci as Hansueli Kopf
- Fanny Ardant as Constance Rose Marie de La Valle
- John Cleese as Arthur William Dallas III
- Bronwyn James as Magnolia
- Joaquim de Almeida as Dr. Lima
- Luca Barbareschi as Bongo
- Milan Peschel as Caspar Tell
- Fortunato Cerlino as Tonino
- Mickey Rourke as Bill Crush
- Sydne Rome as Mrs. Robinson
- Alexander Petrov as Anton, the Russian guest
- Ilia Volok as the Russian ambassador
- Danny Exnar as Vaclav
- Morgane Polanski as Zula
- Matthew T. Reynolds as Simon Faraday
- Luisiana Kornuta Steffen as Mrs. Lima
- Felix Mayr as Plumber
- Angelica Barbareschi as Receptionist
- Teco Celio as Chef
- Davide Gagliardi as Barman
- Anton Pampushnyy as a Russian bodyguard
- January Piromallo as Alice, Mrs. Robinson's friend
- Sina Christen as Precy, Zula's friend
- Irina Kastrinidis as Vaclav's wife

== Production ==
=== Development ===
In April 2021, it was announced that Roman Polanski would direct The Palace, a black comedy about guests at the Gstaad Palace on New Year's Eve 1999. Polanski co-wrote the screenplay with fellow Polish director Jerzy Skolimowski, who also co-wrote Polanski's first feature, Knife in the Water (1962). Luca Barbareschi produced the film, under Eliseo Entertainment, alongside Rai Cinema, CAB Productions, and Lucky Bob.

In April 2022, Mickey Rourke, Joaquim de Almeida, John Cleese, Oliver Masucci, Fanny Ardant, Fortunato Cerlino, and Alexander Petrov were cast in the film, while Alexandre Desplat and Paweł Edelman served as composer and cinematographer, respectively. Wild Bunch sold the film for distribution in Germany and Spain during the 2022 Cannes Film Festival.

Barbareschi said he struggled to find financiers in France, where Polanski is based and most of his previous films were produced. Hervé de Luze and Carlo Poggioli served as editor and costume designer, respectively. Ewa Piaskowska served as an additional screenwriter, while Viktor Dobronravov, Olga Kent, Naike Anna Silipo, Matthew T. Reynolds, Teco Celio, Marina Strakhova, and Danylo Kotov were added to the cast.

=== Filming ===
Principal photography commenced in February 2022 at the Gstaad Palace in Gstaad, Switzerland, and wrapped in June. Filming was originally set to begin in late 2021. By 19 October 2022, the film was in the final editing stages.

== Release ==
The Palace had its world premiere at the 80th Venice International Film Festival, out of competition, on 2 September 2023, where it received a three-minute ovation. It was later released theatrically in Italy on 28 September 2023 by 01 Distribution.

The film also played at the Zurich Film Festival on 3 October 2023 and the CineLibri Film Festival on 20 October 2023 followed by a release in Poland on 3 November 2023 by Next Film, then Russia on 23 November 2023 by Pro:View, after the latter was previously set for release in early 2023. It also played in Hungary and Lithuania on 14 and 22 December 2023 respectively, with Bulgaria following on 12 January 2024. In France, the film received a limited distribution on 15 May 2024 by Swashbuckler Films.

The film was originally set to be released theatrically in Europe in November 2022 and in Italy on 12 January and 6 April 2023. The film was unable to find distribution in the United States or the United Kingdom. Producer Luca Barbareschi stated that this was similar to Polanski's previous film, An Officer and a Spy, which was never released in the US, the UK, Australia or New Zealand.

== Reception ==
=== Box office ===
As of 9 February 2025, The Palace grossed $972,161 in Italy, Portugal, Spain, France, Germany, Poland, Hungary, Lithuania, Russia and Bulgaria.

=== Critical response ===
On the review aggregator website Rotten Tomatoes, 10% of 21 critics' reviews are positive, with an average rating of 3.3/10.

Jo-Ann Titmarsh of the London Evening Standard awarded The Palace one star out of five, noting the controversy surrounding Polanski, while calling the film "so dire that the filmmaker can no longer be defended because of his genius." Kevin Maher, writing for The Times, said the film was "an eye-scorching atrocity that is instantly one of the most egregious film-making failures of the year, possibly even the decade," rated it no stars out of five, and ultimately called it "conspicuously bad". Robbie Collin from The Telegraph criticised the humour and gave the film one star out of five, commenting that it is "at least 23 years past its sell-by date, though less in the sense of 'you can't tell these jokes any more' than 'why would you want to?'."

=== Controversy ===
The featuring of The Palace at the 80th Venice International Film Festival has been controversial and brought significant criticism to its organisers due to the sexual abuse allegations against the film's director. Festival head Alberto Barbera defended their inclusion, saying of Polanski specifically, "I don't understand why one cannot distinguish between the responsibilities of the man and those of the artist. Polanski is 90 years old, he is one of the few working masters, he made an extraordinary film. It may be the last film of his career, although I hope he does like De Oliveira, who made films until he was 105. I stand firmly among those who in the debate distinguish between the responsibility of the man and that of the artist."

In Paris, the film was released in only one independent theater. After the first screening was picketed by a dozen protesters, the theater's manager decided to pull the movie, claiming to have been unaware of the controversy surrounding Polanski.

=== Accolades ===
Paweł Edelman was nominated at the 26th Eagle Polish Film Awards, for Best Cinematography. For his work on the film, Diego Prestopino won the award for "Best Make-up" at the Cinearti International Award "The Head of Berenice".
