= Forget Mozart =

1985 West German-Czechoslovak mystery film

- German: Vergeßt Mozart
- Directed by: Miloslav Luther
- Starring: Max Tidof; Armin Mueller-Stahl; Catarina Raacke; Wolfgang Preiss
- Release date: 1985
- Countries: West Germany; Czechoslovakia

Forget Mozart (German: Vergeßt Mozart) is a 1985 West German-Czechoslovak mystery film directed by Miloslav Luther and starring Armin Mueller-Stahl, Max Tidof, and Wolfgang Preiss.

Following the death of Wolfgang Amadeus Mozart, a number of those who knew him are assembled to establish the cause of his death.

== Cast ==
- Max Tidof as Wolfgang Amadeus Mozart
- Armin Mueller-Stahl as Graf Pergen
- Catarina Raacke as Constanze Mozart
- Wolfgang Preiss as Baron Gottfried van Swieten
- Uwe Ochsenknecht as Director Emanuel Schikaneder
- Winfried Glatzeder as Antonio Salieri
- Kurt Weinzierl as doctor
- Jan Biczycki as servant
- Katja Flint as Magdalena Demel
- Andrej Hryc as Franz Demel
- Ladislav Chudík as Joseph Haydn
- Zdenek Hradilák as Joseph II
- Juraj Hrubant as Figaro
- Andrej Malachovsky as Sarastro
- Lubomír Kostelka as Thorwald
- Naďa Hejná as Salieri's grandmother

== Reception ==
Peter Keough of Chicago Reader wrote, "In Forget Mozart, only the Mozart remains memorable".
