= Lauras Entscheidung =

- Genre: Thriller
- Developed by: Peter Renz
- Directed by: Uwe Janson
- Country of origin: Germany
- Original language: German

Production
- Running time: 90 minutes

Original release
- Release: 1994

Lauras Entscheidung is a 1994 German television film.

== Cast ==
- Suzanne von Borsody as Laura Völlenklee
- Matthias Habich as Joachim Böllinger
- Peter Sattmann as Max Samtwerth
- Dörte Lyssewski as Irmi Schadewald
- Oliver Czeslik
- Chantal De Freitas as Rebecca Hilmar
- Heino Ferch as Wasserwerkmeister Galreith
- Rainer Grenkowitz
- Norbert Heckner
- Heinz Werner Kraehkamp as Bürgermeister Sommer
- Victoria Ludwigs as Bella Völlenklee
- Naoyoshi Nishio as Oshi
- Götz Otto
- Johannes Rapp
- August Schmölzer
- Ferdinand Zander
