= Timur Vermes =

German author (born 1967)

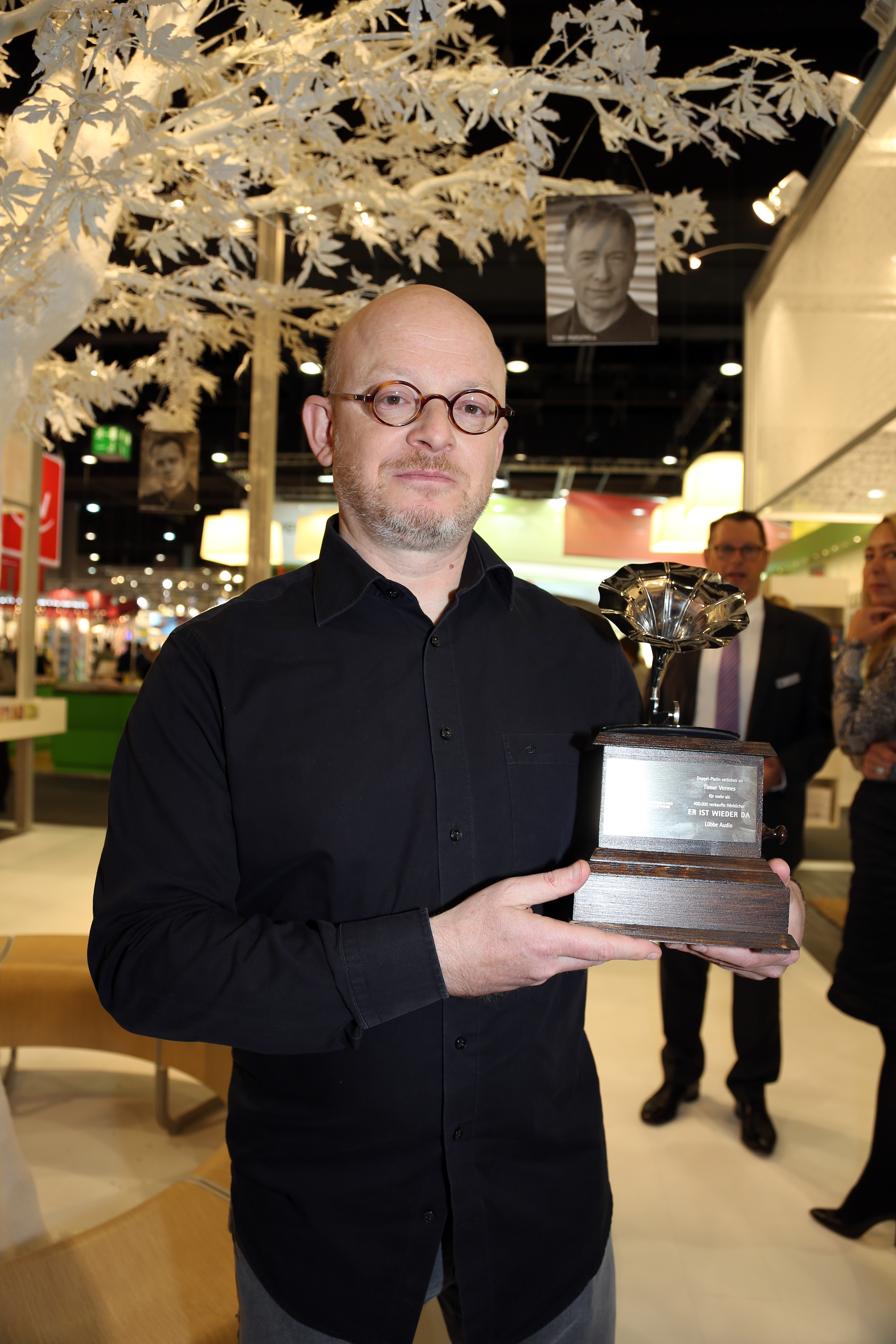
Timur in 2015

Timur Vermes (born 1967) is a German writer. Previously a ghostwriter, his first novel Er ist wieder da, which has sold over a million copies in Germany, is a satire about Adolf Hitler and 21st-century Germany. The English version, Look Who's Back, was translated by Jamie Bulloch and published by MacLehose Press in April 2014. The paperback was released in March 2015.

== Early life ==
Timur Vermes was born in Nuremberg in 1967 to a German mother and Hungarian father. His father had fled from Hungary after the suppression of the Hungarian Revolution of 1956. He attended the Helene Lange Gymnasium in Fürth.

== Career ==
After graduation, he studied history and politics in the University of Erlangen-Nuremberg. Since then, he has been a journalist for tabloids such as the Munich Abendzeitung and the Cologne Express among other newspapers. In 2007, he started to ghostwrite books, including a book by a so-called crime scene cleaner entitled Was vom Tode übrig bleibt (English: What's Left Of Death).

In 2012 he published his debut novel, Er ist wieder da. The novel is a satire in which Adolf Hitler wakes up in Berlin in 2011 and through various comedy television shows eventually re-enters politics. After presentation at the Frankfurt Book Fair, the novel rose to number one on the Spiegel Bestseller List. The audiobook read by Christoph Maria Herbst also reached the top spot. As of July 2015, the book has sold over 1.4 million copies and has been translated into 41 languages.

In 2018, Vermes released his second novel, entitled Die Hungrigen und die Satten (English: The Hungry and the Full).

== Popular culture ==
In December 2013 it was announced that Constantin Film had bought the rights to make a movie based on the novel Er ist wieder da. The film was released in 2015 and later on Netflix in April 2016 as Look Who's Back. Vermes also wrote the script for the film.
