= Fabian Busch =

German actor

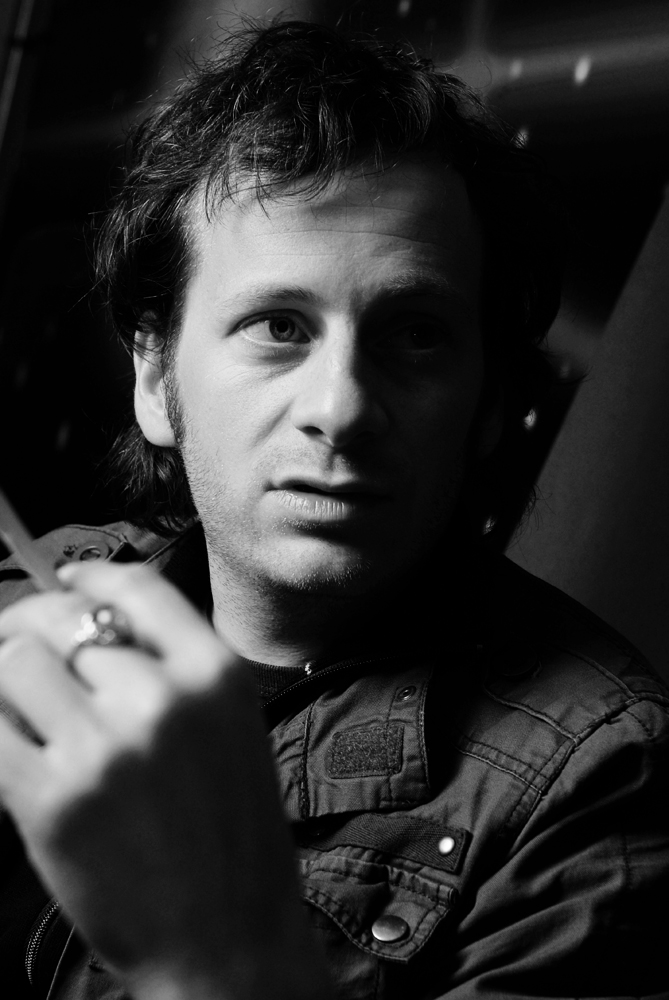
- Busch in 2006
- Born: 1 October 1975 (age 50); East Berlin, East Germany
- Occupation: Actor
- Years active: 1993–present

Fabian Busch (born 1 October 1975) is a German actor. He has appeared in more than sixty films since 1993. Among his best-known films is the film satire Look Who's Back, in which he plays a moviemaker who befriends Adolf Hitler. He also had supporting roles in Downfall (2004) as Obersturmbannführer Stehr and in The Reader (2008) as Kate Winslet's defense attorney. In addition to acting, Busch also directed and wrote the screenplay for the 2009 short film Edgar.

== Selected filmography ==
Films
Year	Title	Role	Notes
1993	Inge, April und Mai		
1995	Under the Milky Way	Tom	
1996	Kinder ohne Gnade	Dennis	TV film
1997	Gone Wrong	Jojo	
1998	23	David	
2000	England!	Tom	
2000	Cold Is the Evening Breeze	Felix	
2000	Dogma 2000 - Unter Freunden	Stefan	
2003	Ein Schiff wird kommen	Leo	
2003	Learning to Lie	Helmut	
2004	Vakuum	Mick	
2004	Farland	Jakob	
2004	Downfall	Obersturmbannführer Stehr	
2004	SommerHundeSöhne	Frank	
2007	Video Kings	Flo	
2007	Sunny		
2008	My Mother's Tears	Alex, today	
2008	The Charlemagne Code	Justus	TV film
2008	Finnischer Tango	Rudolph	
2008	Waiting for Angelina	Olaf	
2008	The Reader	Hanna's Defence Council	
2010	Spear of Destiny	Justus	TV film
2011	Gegengerade	Arne	
2012	The Hunt for the Amber Room	Justus	TV film
2012	Abseitsfalle	Podolski	
2014	A Blind Hero: The Love of Otto Weidt	Chaim Horn	TV film
2014	Fiddlesticks	Otto	
2015	Look Who's Back	Fabian Sawatzki	
2015	Vorstadtrocker		
2016	Sex & Crime	Theo	

TV series
Year	Title	Role	Notes
2011	Der Kriminalist	Jens Knappmeyer	1 episode
2017	Fargo	Jakob Ungerleider	Episode "The Law of Vacant Places"
