= Max Tidof =

German actor (born 1960)

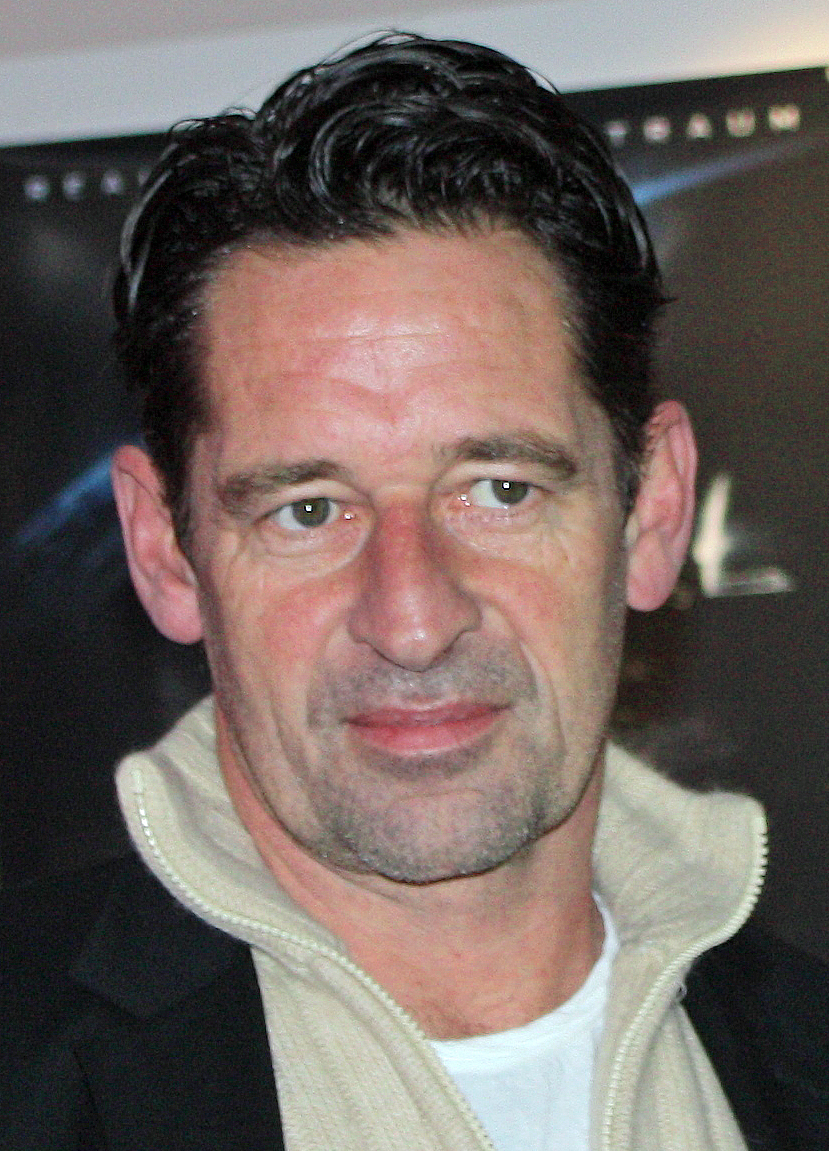
Max Tidof 2012

Max Tidof (born 1960 in Polch) is a German actor.

== Life ==
Born 1960 in Polch, he grew up in Hamburg and moved to Munich in 1979 where he started acting in the Theater.

His first experiences in TV he made 1983 with the famous German TV series Rote Erde. This series was followed by many films in television and cinema.

One of his biggest successes was the role Ari Leschnikoff in the German movie Comedian Harmonists which won many awards.

In 1994-1995 he lived three months in Australia to shoot three episodes of the Australian series The Feds (Terror, Betrayal, Deadfall)

Max Tidof is one of Germany's most versatile actors.

== Family ==
Since 1996 Max Tidof is married to Lisa Seitz, they are living in Munich together with their daughter Luzie.

== Selected filmography ==
- Rote Erde (1983, TV series)
- Forget Mozart (1985), as Mozart
- Gambit (1987, TV film), as Konrad Stromberg
- Who's Afraid of Red, Yellow and Blue (1991), as Matthias Bamuscher
- Making Up! (1993), as Mark
- Ludwig 1881 (1993), as Josef Kainz
- Burning Life (1994), as Pauli
- Surprise! (1995, Short)
- Comedian Harmonists (1997), as Ari Leschnikoff
- Kein Mann für eine Nacht (1998, TV film), as Ion
- Girls Under Investigation (1999), as Harald Poppinger
- Men Are Like Chocolate (1999, TV film), as Mike Badon
- Ein Scheusal zum Verlieben (2000, TV film), as Dr. Benjamin Hofer
- The Sisters' House (2002, TV film), as John Leigh
- Rock Crystal (2004), as Vicar Ernst
- Pirate Vacation (2006, TV film), as Flynn
- Bad Girls (2006, TV film), as Max
- Who's G. (2009, TV film), as Max Burghardt
- Reality XL (2012), as Robin Spector
- The Perjured Farmer (2012, TV film), as Ignaz
- Inseln vor dem Wind (2012, TV film), as Ernesto
