= Bandits (1997 film) =

1997 film

- Theatrical release poster
- Directed by: Katja von Garnier
- Written by: Uwe Wilhelm; Katja von Garnier
- Produced by: Harry Kügler; Molly von Fürstenberg; Elvira Senft
- Starring: Katja Riemann; Jasmin Tabatabai; Nicolette Krebitz; Jutta Hoffmann; Hannes Jaenicke
- Cinematography: Torsten Breuer
- Edited by: Hans Funck
- Music by: Peter Weihe; Udo Arndt
- Production company: Olga-Film
- Distributed by: Buena Vista International
- Release date: 3 July 1997
- Running time: 110 minutes
- Country: Germany
- Language: German

Bandits is a 1997 German road movie directed by Katja von Garnier. The film stars Katja Riemann, Jasmin Tabatabai, Nicolette Krebitz and Jutta Hoffmann. Both the film and soundtrack album were commercially successful in Germany, but Bandits grossed less than $25,000 in the United States. Much of the soundtrack was written and performed by the actresses themselves. The soundtrack reached number one in the German album charts.

== Plot ==
Four women form a band named Bandits as part of an offender rehabilitation program in a German prison. Drummer Emma Moor, a former member of a jazz group, was abused by the bandleader and shot him. Angelika Angel Kleinschmidt is imprisoned for marriage fraud, she plays the bass. Singer and guitarist Ludmilla Luna Nabiba was convicted of aggravated robbery. Marie Irrgang poisoned her husband, is schizoid and suicidal, she plays the piano.

En route to a performance at a police officers' ball the band manages to escape from custody. On their way towards Hamburg they hear one of their own songs on the radio, which they sent to record producer Michael Gold some time ago. Due to the media attention the Bandits have gained, Gold senses an opportunity for profitable business. The four women trick him into paying them without signing the contract he offers, financially securing their escape.

In light of their growing fanbase, the Bandits play a spontaneous concert in a club, but they are interrupted by the police. To evade arrest, they take the American tourist West hostage. The good-looking male causes friction within the group, as he seduces both Angel and Luna. The Bandits leave him behind soon after.

With the police led by Kommissar Schwarz still chasing them, they get surrounded on a bridge. Marie dies of a natural death, and the other bandmembers set the car on fire. Luna and Angel jump into the river, while Emma gets arrested. Soon after, she is freed by the other musicians. They concoct a plan to play a gig on a cruise liner and thereby leave the country.

Prior to their departure the Bandits play a farewell show on a rooftop in the harbor. Kommissar Schwarz and a Sondereinsatzkommando rush to the scene. Constrained by the audience and makeshift barriers, the SWAT team reaches the rooftop only to see the band stage dive down. While Luna, Angel and Emma run towards the cruise liner, Marie appears to be standing behind the guard rail, wearing a red evening dress. Meanwhile, police snipers get into position.

As the Bandits reach the gangway, Kommissar Schwarz addresses them with a bullhorn. Facing the police, they draw their weapons and throw them away. Kommissar Schwarz, however, misinterprets the move and orders the police snipers to shoot. Realizing his mistake, he looks shocked, while muffled shots are heard. The film ends with Marie's hand reaching down to the hands of Luna, Angel and Emma.

== Reception ==
Rotten Tomatoes reports 88% approval of Bandits among eight critics.

== Attempted remake ==
Warner Bros. Pictures purchased the rights for an American remake of the film in 1998. Bill Gerber and John Wells were signed on to produce. Von Garnier was also attached as producer and was even considered to direct, but she declined, claiming that she already had her dream casting for the movie. Several other directors, such as Joel Schumacher, were considered before music video director Nancy Bardawil was attached to direct in 2002, while Susan Skoog wrote the script. No further development was reported afterwards.

== Awards ==
- 1998 Bavarian Film Award for best music.
- 1998 German Film Award Best Actress (Katja Riemann)
- 1999 Grand Prize at the 10th Yubari International Fantastic Film Festival
