= Katja von Garnier =

German film director (born 1966)

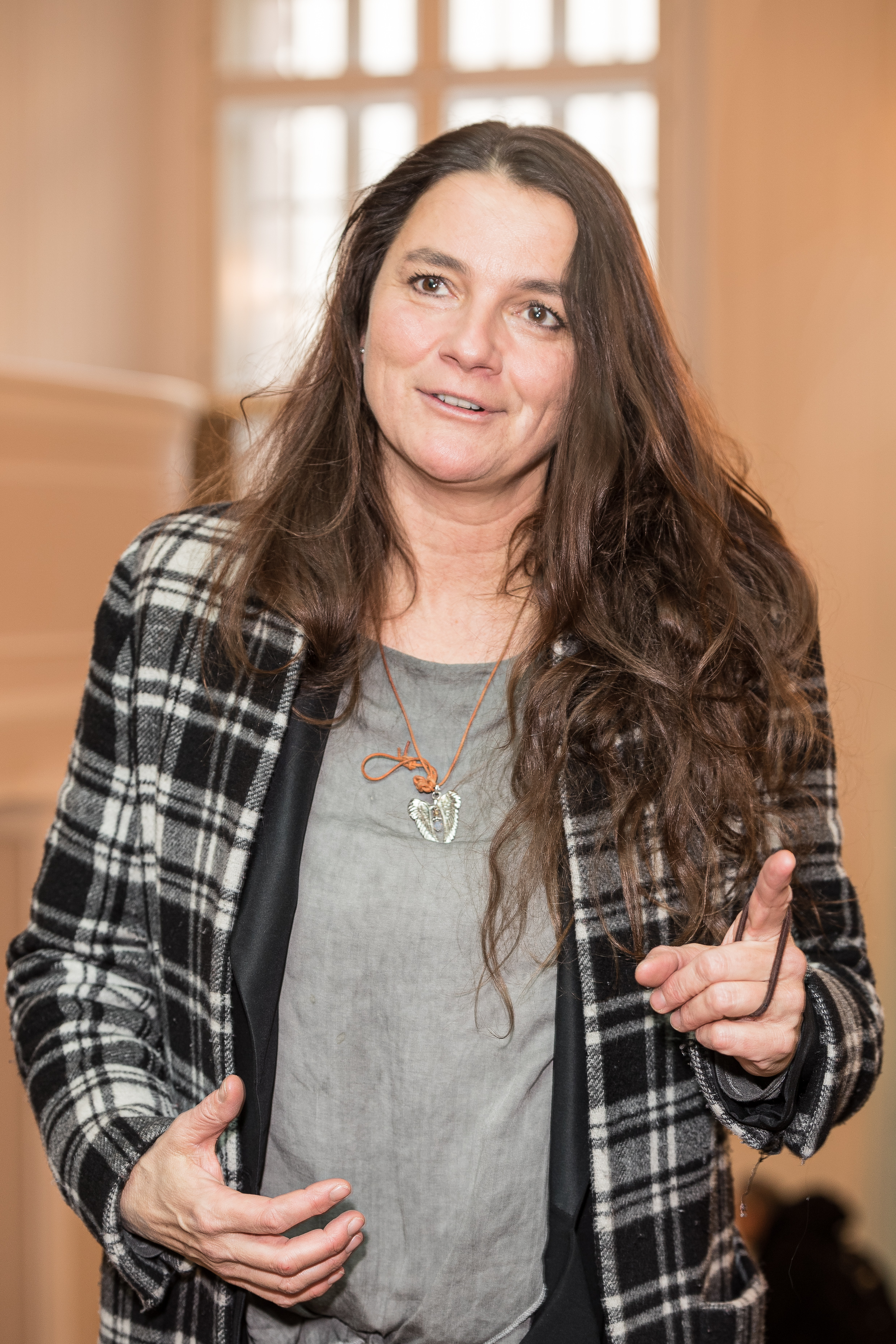
- Born: 15 December 1966 (age 59); Wiesbaden, West Germany (now Germany)
- Occupation: Film director
- Years active: 1993 – present

Katja von Garnier (born 15 December 1966) is a German film director.

== Biography ==
von Garnier was born in Wiesbaden. From 1989 to 1994, she studied at the University of Television and Film Munich. Her 1993 practice film Making Up! was shown in theatres all over Germany and attracted 1.2 million visitors. The project had been rejected by several producers who had not believed that a one-hour film could become a commercial success.

The 1997 film Bandits starring Katja Riemann was also a commercial success and was the winner of the Grand Prize at the 10th Yubari International Fantastic Film Festival held in February 1999.

In 1999, she was a member of the jury at the 49th Berlin International Film Festival.

In 2002, she directed in the United States for the first time. The resulting movie Iron Jawed Angels about the women's suffrage movement was produced by HBO Films and released in 2004.

== Filmography ==
- 1989: Tagtrauma (Short)
- 1991: Lautlos (Short)
- 1993: Making Up!
- 1997: Denk ich an Deutschland … – Kix? (TV documentary series episode)
- 1997: Bandits
- 2004: Iron Jawed Angels (TV film)
- 2007: Blood & Chocolate
- 2013: Windstorm
- 2015: Windstorm 2
- 2015: Forever and a Day (portrait of the German band Scorpions)
- 2017: Windstorm 3: Windstorm and the Wild Horses

== Awards ==
- 1993 Bavarian Film Awards, Best New Director

== Personal life ==
Together with her husband, director Markus Goller, and their son Merlin, Katja von Garnier lives in Los Angeles.
