= Katja Riemann =

German actress (born 1963)

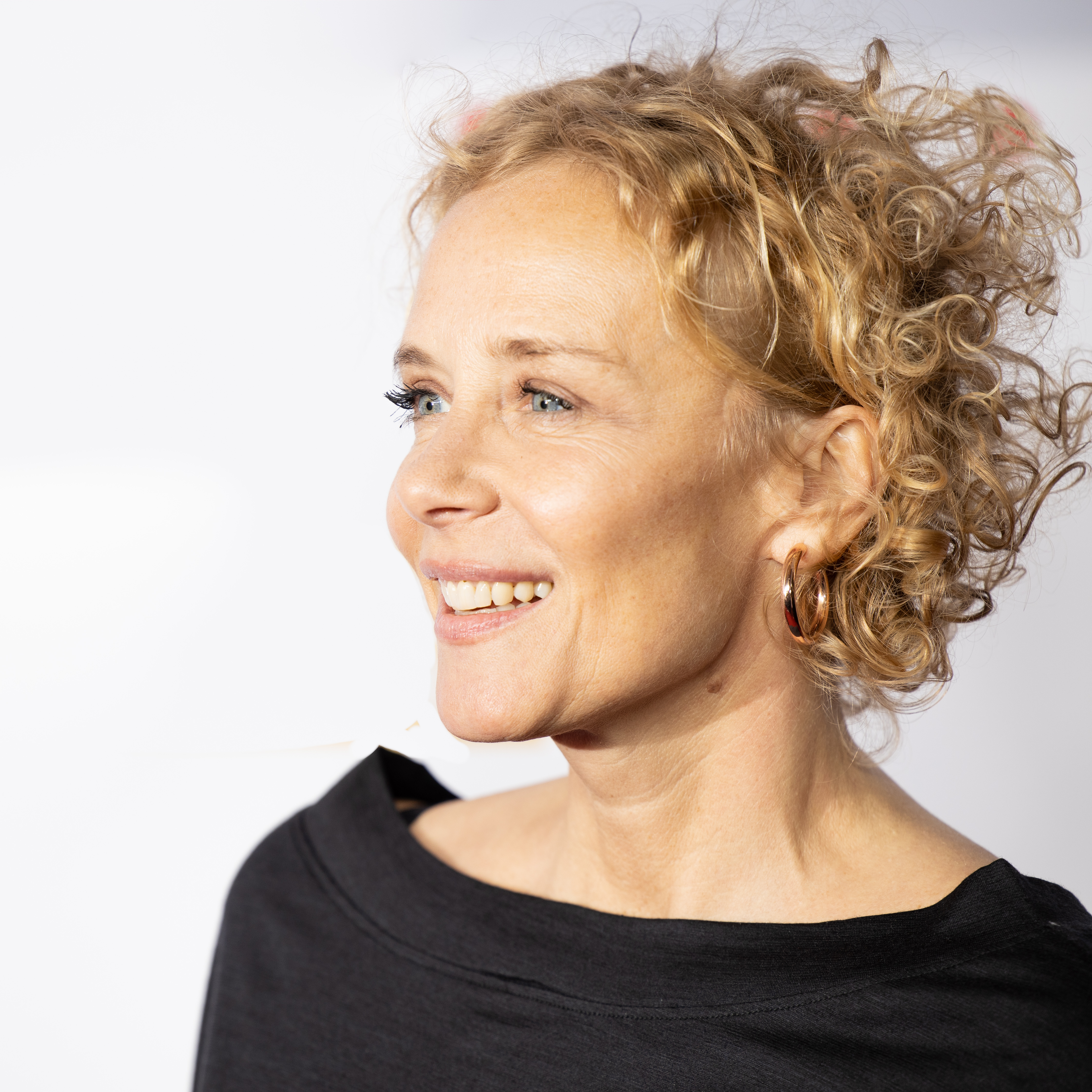
- Riemann in 2020
- Born: Katja Hannchen Leni Riemann; 1 November 1963 (age 62); Weyhe-Kirchweyhe, West Germany
- Occupation: Actress
- Years active: 1988–present
- Partner: Peter Sattmann (1990–1998)
- Children: Paula Riemann
- Website: katja-riemann.de

Katja Hannchen Leni Riemann (German: [ˈkat.ja ˈʁiː.man], born 1 November 1963) is a German actress.

The daughter of two teachers, Riemann grew up in Weyhe, near Bremen. After high school she went to Hamburg to study music and theater. She is the mother of actress Paula Riemann, whose father is Peter Sattmann.

== Selected filmography ==
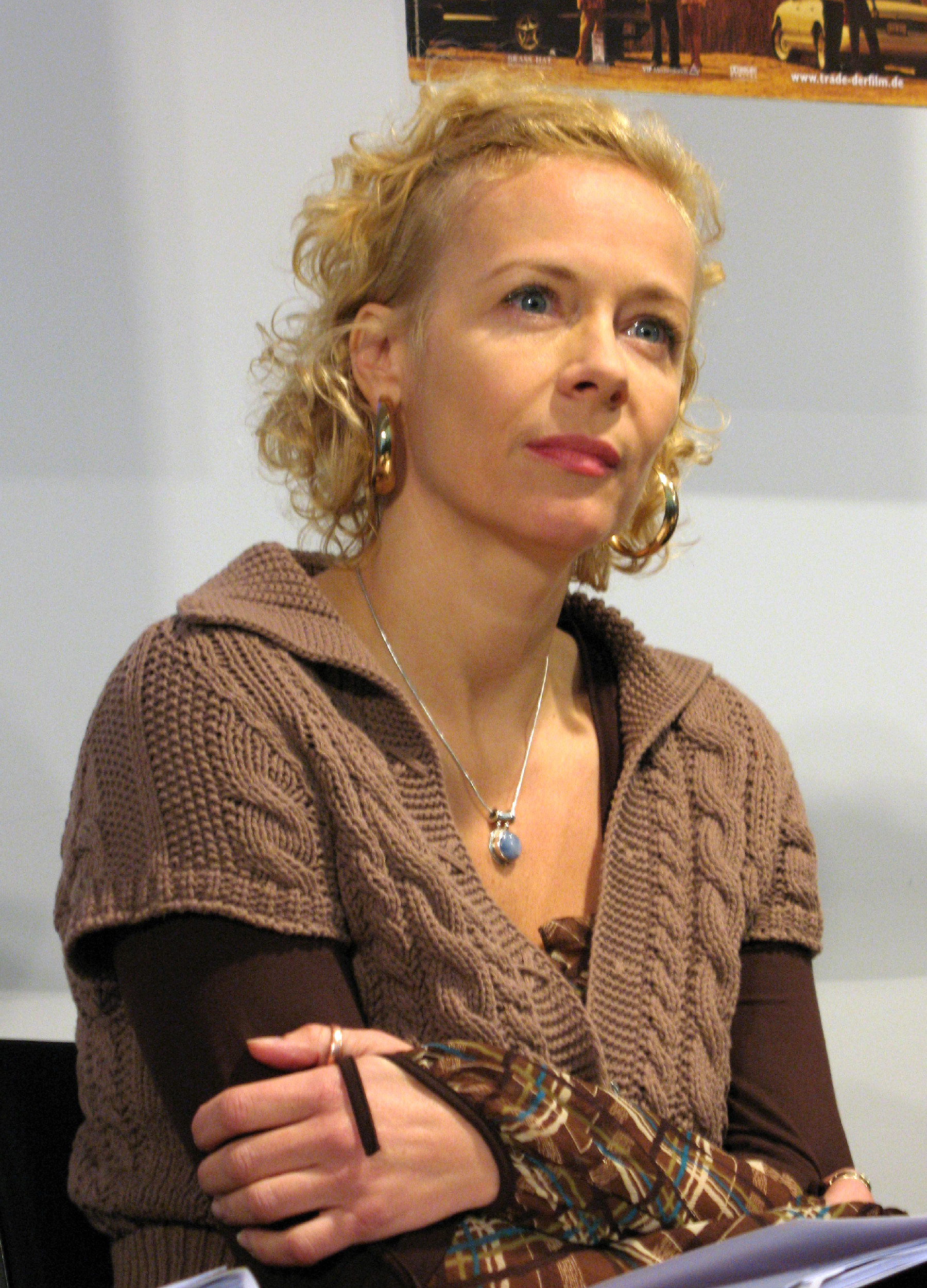
Riemann in 2007

- Sommer in Lesmona (dir. Peter Beauvais, 1987, TV miniseries)
- No Mention of Violence (dir. Theodor Kotulla, 1991, TV film)
- Regina auf den Stufen (dir. Bernd Fischerauer, 1992, TV miniseries)
- Pauline In Between (dir. Peter Timm, 1993)
- Making Up! (dir. Katja von Garnier, 1993)
- Der bewegte Mann (dir. Sönke Wortmann, 1994)
- Heaven and Hell (dir. Hans-Christian Schmid, 1994, TV film)
- Over My Dead Body (dir. Rainer Matsutani, 1995)
- Talk of the Town (dir. Rainer Kaufmann, 1995)
- Dangerous Dowry (dir. Dennis Satin, 1996)
- Bandits (dir. Katja von Garnier, 1997)
- The Pharmacist (dir. Rainer Kaufmann, 1997)
- Comedian Harmonists (1997)
- Balzac (dir. Josée Dayan, 1999, TV film)
- Desire (dir. Colleen Murphy, 2000)
- Bibi Blocksberg (2002)
- Rosenstrasse (dir. Margarethe von Trotta, 2003)
- Agnes and His Brothers (dir. Oskar Roehler, 2004)
- Bibi Blocksberg and the Secret of the Blue Owls (2004)
- I Am the Other Woman (dir. Margarethe von Trotta, 2006)
- Life Actually (dir. Alain Gsponer, 2006)
- Blood & Chocolate (2007)
- Shanghai Baby (dir. Berengar Pfahl, 2007)
- Runaway Horse (dir. Rainer Kaufmann, 2007)
- The Frontier (2010, TV film)
- Pigeons on the Roof (2011)
- The Foster Boy (2011)
- The Weekend (2012)
- Baron on the Cannonball (2012, TV film)
- Where Friendship Ends (2013, TV film)
- Fack ju Göhte (dir. Bora Dağtekin, 2013)
- Kleine Schiffe (2013, TV film)
- Die Fahnderin (dir. Züli Aladağ, 2014, TV film)
- Coming In (dir. Marco Kreuzpaintner, 2014)
- The Misplaced World (dir. Margarethe von Trotta, 2015)
- Look Who's Back (dir. David Wnendt, 2015)
- Fack ju Göhte 2 (dir. Bora Dağtekin, 2015)
- CHIX – Back on Stage (2015, TV film)
- Too Hard to Handle (2016)
- SMS für Dich (dir. Karoline Herfurth, 2016)
- Fack ju Göhte 3 (dir. Bora Dağtekin, 2017)
- Forget About Nick (2017)
- Subs (dir. Oskar Roehler, 2018)
- Enfant Terrible (2020)
- Stella. A Life. (2023)

== Awards ==
- 1993 Bavarian Film Award, Best Actress
- 1995 Bavarian Film Award, Best Actress
- 1997 Bavarian Film Award, Best Film Score
