= Pope Joan (disambiguation) =

Pope Joan is the subject of a medieval legend about a woman who reigned as pope.

Pope Joan may also refer to:

- Pope Joan (1972 film)
- Pope Joan (2009 film), based on the Cross novel
- Pope Joan (card game)
- Pope Joan (horse), a Thoroughbred racehorse
- Pope Joan (novel), a 1996 novel by Donna Woolfolk Cross
- The Papess Joanne (Ἡ Πάπισσα Ἰωάννα), an 1866 novel by Emmanuel Rhoides
  - The Curious History of Pope Joan, a 1954 translation of the novel by Lawrence Durrell
