= Legends surrounding the papacy =

The papacy has been surrounded by numerous legends. Among the most famous are the claims that the papal tiara bears the Number of the Beast inscriptions, that a woman was once elected pope, or that the pope elected after Pope Benedict XVI was to be the last known as “Petrus Romanus”.

== Vicarius Filii Dei ==
One misconception surrounding the papal tiara suggests that the words Vicarius Filii Dei (Latin for "Vicar of the Son of God") exist on the side of one of the tiaras.

The story centres on the widely made claim that, when numerised (i.e., when those letters in the 'title' that have Roman numeral value are added together as in a chronogram) they produce the number 666, described in the Book of Revelation as the Number of the Beast (the Antichrist), who wears multiple crowns (identified by some as the triple tiara).

VICARIVS·FILII·DEI with the non-numeric letters removed gives: VICIVILIIDI = 5 + 1 + 100 + 1 + 5 + 1 + 50 + 1 + 1 + 500 + 1 = 666

This claim has been made by some Protestant sects who believe that the Pope, as head of the Roman Catholic Church, is the Beast or the False Prophet mentioned in the Book of Revelation. However, a detailed examination of the existing tiaras shows no such decoration.

Furthermore, Vicarius Filii Dei is not among the titles of the Pope; the closest match is Vicarius Christi ("Vicar of Christ", also rendered in English as "Vicar of Jesus Christ"), the numerical values of which do not add up to 666, but to 214.

== Pope Joan ==
The claim that a woman, often called Pope Joan, became pope first appeared in a Dominican chronicle in 1250. It soon spread Europe-wide through preaching friars. The story grew in embellishment but centered on a set of claims.

The period for this claim is traditionally given as AD 855–858, between the reigns of Leo IV and Benedict III; however, this possibility is unlikely, because Leo IV died on 17 July 855 and Benedict III was elected as his successor on 29 September 855.

Jean de Mailly, a French Dominican at Metz, places the story in the year 1099, in his Chronica Universalis Mettensis, which dates from approximately 1250 and gives what is almost certainly the earliest account of the woman who became known as Pope Joan. His compatriot Stephen of Bourbon acknowledges this by placing her rule at approximately 1100. Also, Rosemary and Darrell Pardoe, authors of The Female Pope: The Mystery of Pope Joan. The First Complete Documentation of the Facts behind the Legend, is assuming that a more plausible time-frame would be 1086–1108, when there were a lot of antipopes, and the reign of the legitimate popes Victor III, Urban II, and Paschal II was not always established in Rome, since this city was occupied by Henry IV, Holy Roman Emperor, and later sacked by the Normans.

Generally, there are two versions of the legend.

- In the first, an English woman, called Joan, went to Athens with her lover, and studied there.
- In the second, a German woman called Giliberta was born in Mainz.

"Joan" disguised herself as a monk, called Joannes Anglicus. In time, she rose to the highest office of the church, becoming a pope.

After two or five years of reign, "Pope Joan" became pregnant and, during an Easter procession, she gave birth to the child on the streets when she fell off a horse. She was publicly stoned to death by the astonished crowd, and according to the legend, removed from the Vatican archives.

As a consequence, certain traditions stated that popes throughout the medieval period were required to undergo a procedure wherein they sat on a special chair with a hole in the seat. A cardinal would have the task of putting his hand up the hole to check whether the pope had testicles, or doing a visual examination. This procedure is not taken seriously by most historians, and there is no documented instance. It is probably a scurrilous legend based on the existence of two ancient stone chairs with holes in the seats that probably dated from Roman times and may have been used because of their ancient imperial origins. Their original purpose is obscure.

In a seventeenth-century study, Protestant historian David Blondel argued that 'Pope Joan' is a fictitious story. The story may well be a satire that came to be believed as reality. This view is generally accepted among historians.

== Prophecy of the Popes ==
According to the Prophecy of the Popes, some interpretations hold that after Pope Benedict XVI, who abdicated on 28 February 2013, there would be one pope left before the destruction of Rome. This individual was labeled by the prophecy as Petrus Romanus.

== Vaticinia de Summis Pontificibus ==
A series of manuscript prophecies concerning the Papacy.

== Documents of Jesus Christ ==
It is sometimes claimed that there exists a collection of documents that directly refer to Jesus, such as the execution order for Jesus signed by Pontius Pilate, or were personally written by Jesus, explaining to his followers how to conduct the formation of the Catholic Church after his death, or even the exact date of his return to judge mankind. These documents are said to be a closely guarded secret of the Catholic Church, and supposedly are hidden in the Vatican Secret Archives, or at past times in an underground vault if Nazi Germany would invade the Vatican.

However, there is no solid evidence for any of these claims; in history, only one document has ever been attributed to Jesus himself, the Letter of Christ and Abgarus. Scholars generally believe that those letters were fabricated, probably in the 3rd century AD. Even in ancient times, Augustine and Jerome contended that Jesus wrote nothing at all during his life. The correspondence was rejected as apocryphal by Pope Gelasius I and a Roman synod (c. 495).

== Jewish legends ==
Jewish legends related to the papacy include the Jewish pope Andreas and also concerning the fate of the Menorah, which some, including former Israeli Minister of Religious Affairs Shimon Shetreet, have believed is being held in secret by the Vatican, and the idea of hidden Jewish manuscripts in the Vatican Secret Archives.

== See also ==
- Vatican conspiracy theories
