= Bernd Eichinger =

German film producer, screenwriter, and director (1949– 2011)

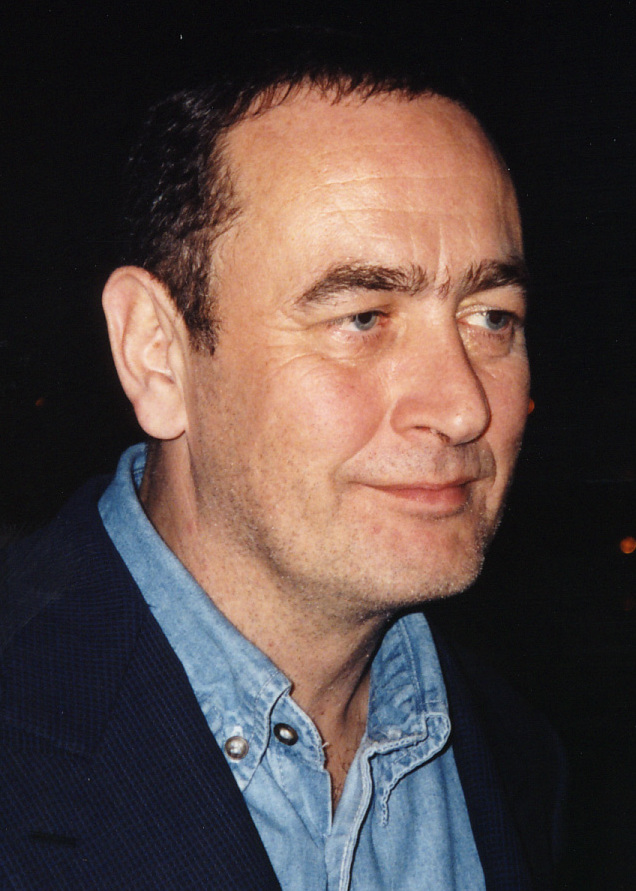
- Eichinger in 1997
- Born: 11 April 1949; Neuburg an der Donau, Bavaria, occupied Germany
- Died: 24 January 2011 (aged 61); Los Angeles, California, U.S.
- Occupations: Film producer; screenwriter; director
- Years active: 1972–2010
- Spouse: Katja Hofmann (m. 2006)
- Partner(s): Jane Seitz (1980s); Katja Flint (1990s); Corinna Harfouch (1999–2004)
- Children: Nina Eichinger

Bernd Eichinger (German: [bɛʁnt ˈʔaɪçɪŋɐ]; 11 April 1949 – 24 January 2011) was a German film producer, screenwriter, and director.

== Life and career ==
Eichinger was born in Neuburg an der Donau. He attended the University of Television and Film Munich in the 1970s and bought a stake in the fledgling studio company Neue Constantin Film in 1979, becoming its executive director. Under his leadership, Constantin Film evolved into one of the most successful German film businesses. As of 2005, he was chairman of the supervisory board and still owned a substantial stake in the company. Eichinger also produced some movies independently (for example, Downfall). One of Eichinger's last films was about the left-wing terrorist group Red Army Faction (RAF) and based on the book Der Baader Meinhof Komplex ("The Baader-Meinhof Complex") by Stefan Aust.

The range of genres of films, for television and the big screen, was unusually varied. He produced a 3D zombie movie, Resident Evil: Afterlife; to Atomised, a film adaptation of novel by French star writer and social critic Michel Houellebecq. He was an incredibly prolific film maker, with almost 100 films to his credit.

Eichinger was known as tenacious. It took him 20 years to convince Patrick Süskind, the German author of Perfume: The Story of a Murderer, to trust him with the rights to make the international bestseller into a film. In 2006, the film was released, grossing $135 million worldwide.

In the 1980s, Eichinger obtained the film rights to the Fantastic Four and Silver Surfer, decades before making movies based on Marvel comics was trending.

In 1991, he was a co-founder of Summit, the Los Angeles-based production and film sales company. Due to the success of Twilight, Summit eventually became Summit Entertainment.

== Family ==
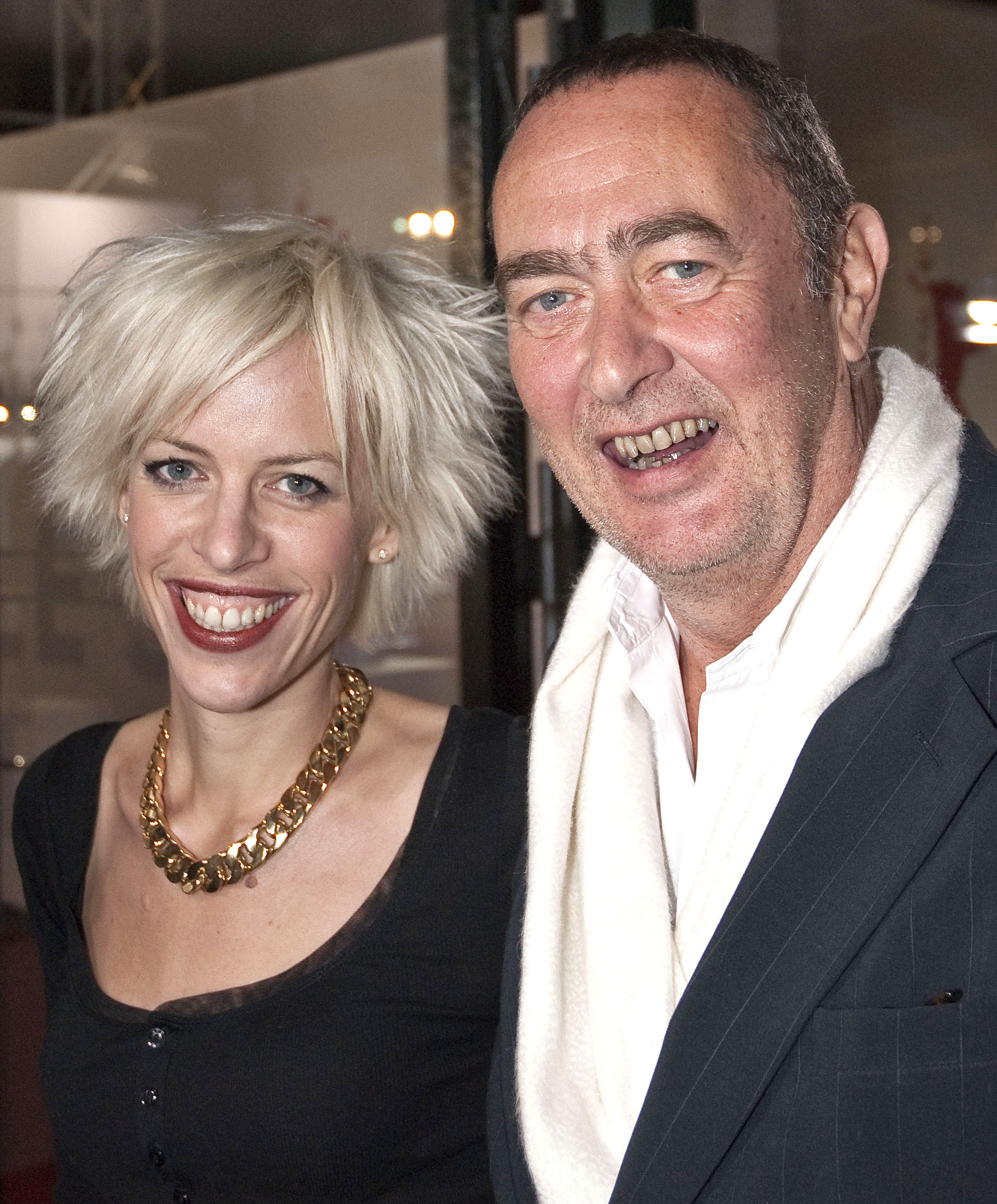
Eichinger with his wife Katja in 2008

Eichinger was married to Katja Hofmann, a journalist. He had a daughter from a previous relationship, Nina Eichinger, an actress and TV presenter.

== Death ==
Eichinger died of a heart attack in Los Angeles on 24 January 2011 during dinner with family and friends. He was 61.

== Awards ==
- 1984 Bavarian Film Awards, Best Producing
- 1986 Bavarian Film Awards, Best Producing
- 1993 Bavarian Film Awards, Best Producing

== Selected filmography ==
Bernd Eichinger's best known films include:

Year	Title	Director	Based on	Language	Notes
1977	Grete Minde	Heidi Genée	A novel by Theodor Fontane	German	
1977	Die Konsequenz	Wolfgang Petersen	An autobiographical novel by Alexander Ziegler	German	TV film
1977	Hitler: A Film from Germany	Hans-Jürgen Syberberg		German	
1978	The Glass Cell	Hans W. Geißendörfer	The Glass Cell by Patricia Highsmith	German	
1981	Christiane F.	Uli Edel	The non-fiction book by Kai Hermann and Horst Rieck about Christiane F.	German	
1984	The Neverending Story	Wolfgang Petersen	The Neverending Story by Michael Ende	English	
1986	The Name of the Rose	Jean-Jacques Annaud	The Name of the Rose by Umberto Eco	English	
1987	Der Unsichtbare	Ulf Miehe		German	
1988	Me and Him	Doris Dörrie	A novel by Alberto Moravia	English	
1989	Last Exit to Brooklyn	Uli Edel	Last Exit to Brooklyn by Hubert Selby Jr.	English	
1990	Fire, Ice and Dynamite	Willy Bogner		English	
1990	Werner – Beinhart!	Gerhard Hahn, Michael Schaack, Niki List	The Werner comic books by Rötger Feldmann	German	
1991	Manta, Manta	Wolfgang Büld		German	
1992	Salt on Our Skin	Andrew Birkin	A novel by Benoîte Groult	English	
1993	The Cement Garden	Andrew Birkin	The Cement Garden by Ian McEwan	English	
1993	The House of the Spirits	Bille August	The House of the Spirits by Isabel Allende	English	
1994	The Fantastic Four	Oley Sassone	Fantastic Four by Jack Kirby and Stan Lee	English	Unreleased
1994	Der bewegte Mann	Sönke Wortmann	Two comic books by Ralf König	German	
1996	The Superwife	Sönke Wortmann	A novel by Hera Lind	German	
1996	A Girl Called Rosemary	Bernd Eichinger	Rosemary (1958)	German	TV film
1997	Smilla's Sense of Snow	Bille August	Miss Smilla's Feeling for Snow by Peter Høeg	English	
1997	Prince Valiant	Anthony Hickox	Prince Valiant by Hal Foster	English	
1998	Wrongfully Accused	Pat Proft		English	
1999	The Devil and Ms. D	Bernd Eichinger	A novel by Helmut Krausser	German	also screenwriter
2000	Ants in the Pants	Marc Rothemund		German	
2001	The Mists of Avalon	Uli Edel	The Mists of Avalon by Marion Zimmer Bradley	English	TV film
2001	Nowhere in Africa	Caroline Link	An autobiographical novel by Stefanie Zweig	German	co-produced by Eichinger; won Oscar
2002	666 – Traue keinem, mit dem du schläfst!	Rainer Matsutani		German	
2002	Resident Evil	Paul W. S. Anderson	Resident Evil	English	
2004	Downfall	Oliver Hirschbiegel		German	also screenwriter
2004	Resident Evil: Apocalypse	Alexander Witt	Resident Evil	English	
2005	Fantastic Four	Tim Story	Fantastic Four by Jack Kirby and Stan Lee	English	
2006	Atomised	Oskar Roehler	Atomised by Michel Houellebecq	German	
2006	DOA: Dead or Alive	Corey Yuen	Dead or Alive	English	
2006	Perfume: The Story of a Murderer	Tom Tykwer	Perfume by Patrick Süskind	English	co-writer
2007	Fantastic Four: Rise of the Silver Surfer	Tim Story	Fantastic Four by Jack Kirby and Stan Lee	English	
2007	Resident Evil: Extinction	Russell Mulcahy	Resident Evil	English	
2007	Pornorama	Marc Rothemund		German	
2008	The Baader Meinhof Complex	Uli Edel	The non-fiction book by Stefan Aust about the Red Army Faction	German	also screenwriter
2009	Pope Joan	Sönke Wortmann	Pope Joan by Donna Woolfolk Cross	English	
2010	Zeiten ändern dich	Uli Edel	The autobiography of the German rapper Bushido	German	co-writer
2010	Resident Evil: Afterlife	Paul W. S. Anderson	Resident Evil	English	
2013	3096 Days	Sherry Hormann		English	
