= Johanna Wokalek =

German stage and film actress (born 1975)

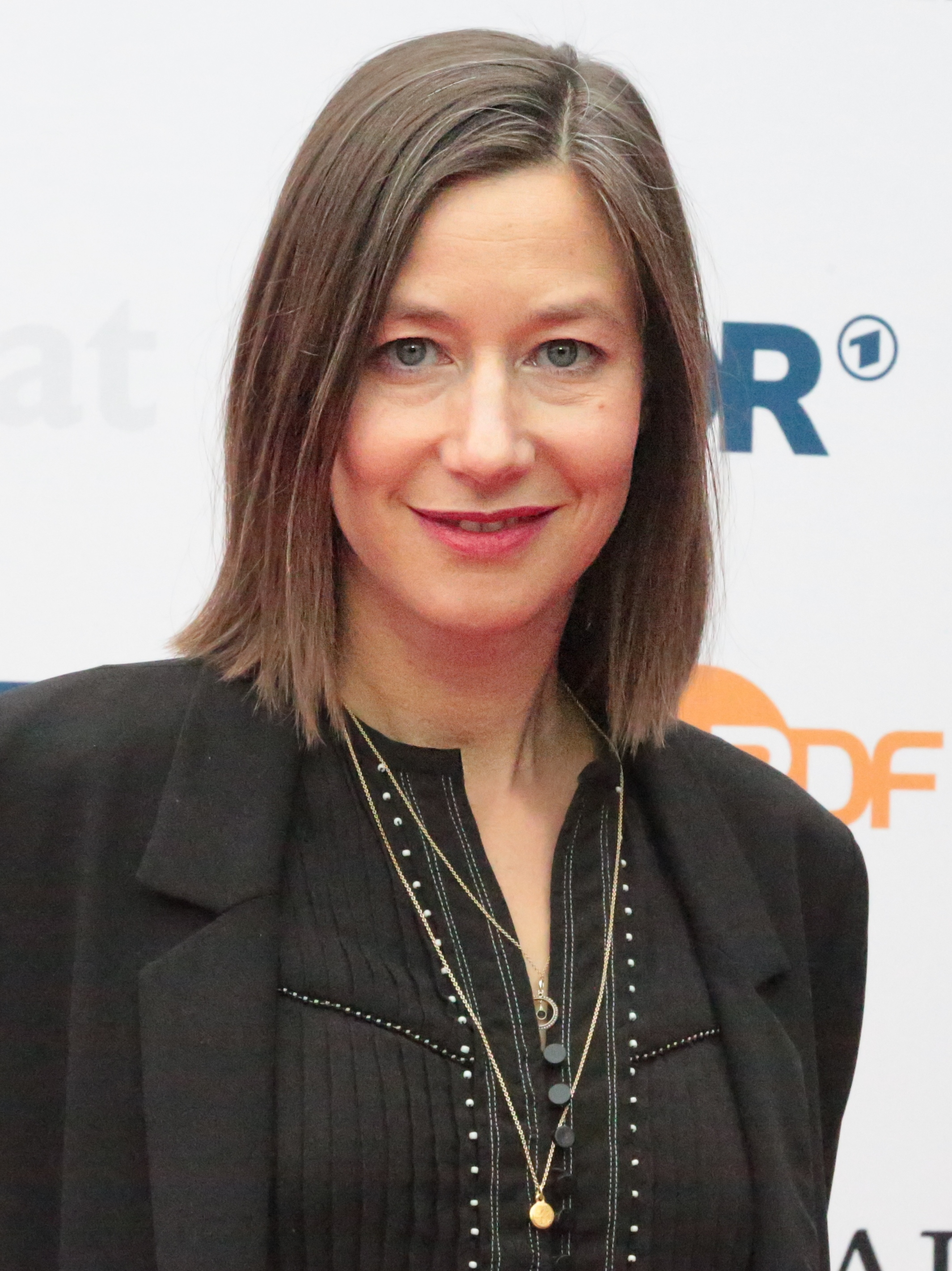
- Wokalek in 2018
- Born: 3 March 1975 (age 51); Freiburg im Breisgau, Baden-Württemberg, West Germany
- Occupation: actress
- Years active: 1998–present

Johanna Wokalek (born 3 March 1975) is a German stage and film actress. A student of Klaus Maria Brandauer, she received critical recognition and three newcomer awards for her performance in the play Rose Bernd. Wokalek is best known for her award-winning appearances in the German films Hierankl, Barfuss, and The Baader Meinhof Complex. She received the Bambi award for her portrayal of the Red Army Faction member Gudrun Ensslin in 2008. She played the lead role in the film Pope Joan in 2009.

== Early life ==
Wokalek was born in Freiburg, West Germany, daughter of a professor of dermatology from Mediaş, Romania. She attended the Friedrich-Gymnasium in Freiburg where she first tried acting in the school's drama group in 1991.

After her final exams in 1994 Wokalek intended to allow herself up to three applications at drama schools before choosing a different career. Her first application to study at the Max-Reinhardt-Seminar in Vienna was accepted, and she moved to the Austrian capital in 1995 to begin her four-year study as a student of Klaus Maria Brandauer. Brandauer, well known for his parts in Mephisto, Out of Africa and Never Say Never Again, started teaching at the seminar at the same time.

== Career ==
=== 1996–2002: Stage acting and first feature film ===
Still in her studies, 21-year-old Wokalek made her professional stage debut during the 1996 Wiener Festwochen in Joshua Sobol's play Alma, directed by Paulus Manker. Soon after, she played Polly in Brecht's The Threepenny Opera (also directed by Paulus Manker and with costumes by Vivienne Westwood), shown in Vienna's Burgtheater, one of the best-known stage theaters in the world.

In 1997, during the third year of her study at the Reinhardt-Seminar, she played the maid Ilse in Max Färberböck's critically acclaimed drama Aimée und Jaguar, her first feature film. In the fall of 1997 Wokalek accepted her first engagement with the Theater Bonn and stopped attending the seminar. During the two and a half year engagement she played Leonore in Schiller's Fiesco, and received three newcomer awards and wide critical recognition for her performance as Rose in Gerhart Hauptmann's play Rose Bernd. Wokalek also featured in TV versions of the plays Alma (filmed 1997) and Rose Bernd (filmed 1998).

In March 2000 she moved back to Vienna and became a permanent member of the Burgtheater ensemble. In her first performance she played the abused and abandoned Nina in Anton Chekhov's The Seagull, directed by Luc Bondy, which was well received. Wokalek repeatedly performed at the Salzburg Festival. In 2000 she played Ophelia in Hamlet, as a guest performance with the Staatstheater Stuttgart, and in 2002 she played the leading part in the German language premiere of The Shape of Things.

=== 2002–present: Film & theatre ===
In 2002 Wokalek played Lene Thurner in the award-winning family drama Hierankl. The modern Heimatfilm, named after a district in Surberg, Germany, is the film debut of writer and director Hans Steinbichler. Wokalek received several awards and nominations for her first leading part in a feature film, among them the 2003 Bavarian Film Award and the 2006 Adolf Grimme Award, which is considered the most important German TV award. Wokalek starred in the 2003 TV three-parter Queen of Cherries by Rainer Kaufmann.

In 2005 Wokalek was cast as the female lead in the romantic comedy Barfuss, directed by Til Schweiger. The film was a local box office success. Her performance as Leila, an escapee from a mental institution, opposite actor-director Til Schweiger brought her wide public recognition. She was nominated as best German actress for her performances in Barfuss, Hierankl and Queen of Cherries for the Goldene Kamera award in 2006, and received the Shooting Stars Award as best new German actress during the Berlinale in the same year.

Wokalek played Anna in the sci-fi thriller Silent Resident, which premiered at the 2007 Toronto International Film Festival, and starred as the young journalist Luise Fellner in Phillip Stölzl's North Face. Wokalek was cast as the Red Army Faction terrorist Gudrun Ensslin in Uli Edel's 2008 film The Baader Meinhof Complex, an adaptation of the non-fiction book of the same name by Stefan Aust. Her performance in the film was awarded with a nomination for the 2009 German Film Awards and a Bambi award as best German actress. The film was chosen as Germany's submission to the 81st Academy Awards for Best Foreign Language Film, and was also nominated Best Foreign Language Film for the 66th Golden Globe Awards.

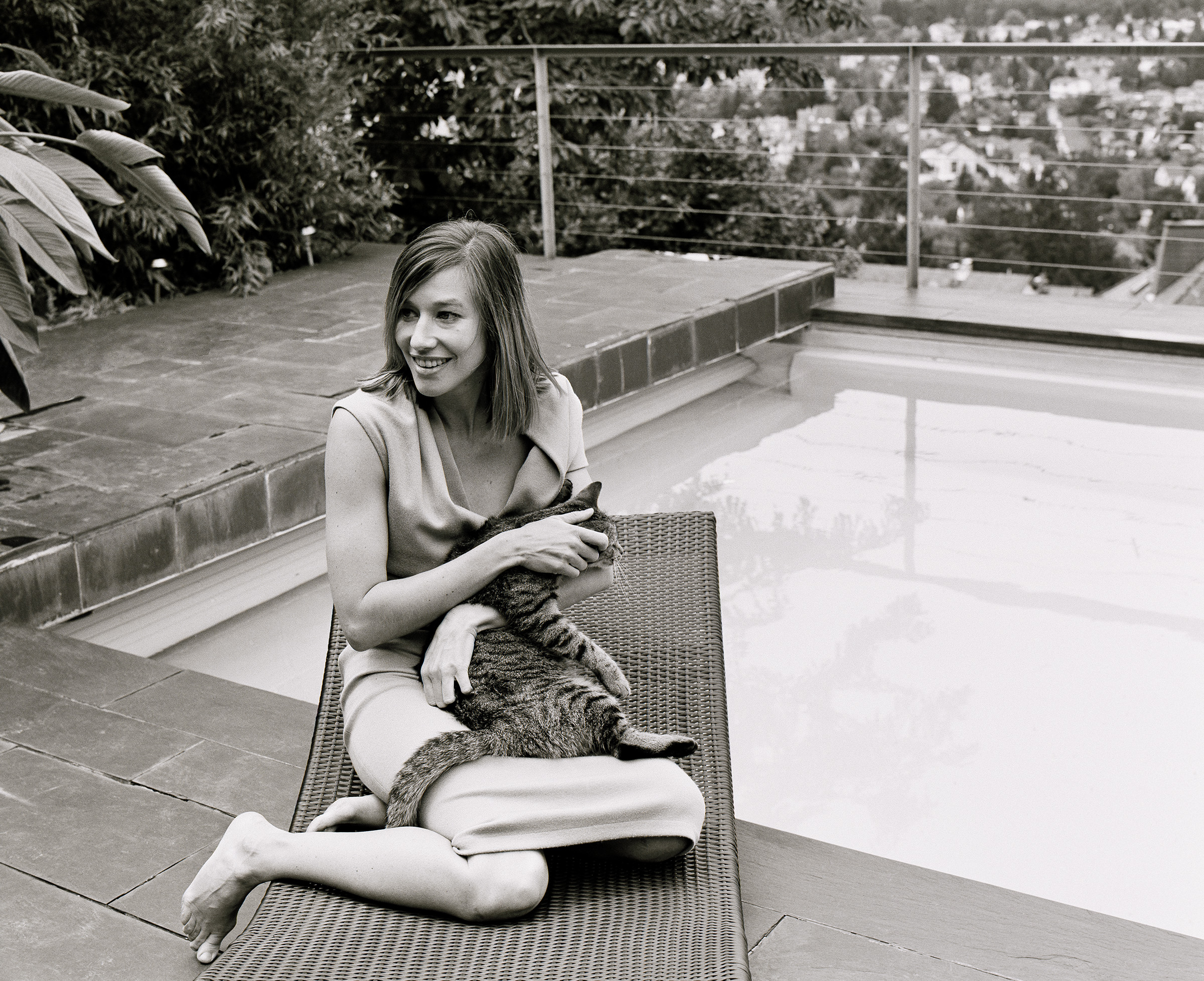
Johanna Wokalek photographed by Oliver Mark, Vienna 2008

In the summer of 2008 she replaced Franka Potente as Johanna von Ingelheim, the titular role in Sönke Wortmann's Pope Joan. The adaptation of American novelist Donna Woolfolk Cross' book of the same name is the first time Wokalek has to carry a large-scale production by herself. Wokalek, who had to tonsure her hair for the role, stars alongside David Wenham and John Goodman. The film was released on 22 October 2009.

As of 2009 Wokalek continues to star in plays in the Burgtheater, including the title role in Andrea Breth's 2003 production of Emilia Galotti, and Queen Margaret in Shakespeare's The War of the Roses in 2008, directed by Stephan Kimmig.

On 28 July 2014 Wokalek made her operatic debut (in a speaking role with a small bit of singing) in the world premiere of Marc-André Dalbavie's opera Charlotte Salomon given at the Salzburg Festival.

Wokalek has also appeared in Lars Kraume’s Die kommenden Tage (The Coming Days) and Sherry Hormann’s comedy Anleitung zum Unglücklichsein (The Pursuit of Unhappiness) (2012). In 2017 she took part in Matthias Glasner’s two-part drama for German television, Redemption Road, and in Jan Speckenbach’s cinema release, Freedom, which was shown at the Locarno Festival. Redemption Road was awarded a Grimme Prize in 2018.

In 2019 Wokalek plays Ditte Nansen in Christina Schwochow’s remake of the novel The German Lesson by Siegfried Lenz. In Jonas Alexander Arnby’s drama Suicide Tourist she is seen as Linda.

In 2019 Wokalek returns to the Burgtheater as Frau John in Gerhard Hauptmann's drama The rats, directed by Andrea Beth. In the same year Wokalek appears on stage with the Tanztheater Wuppertal Pina Bausch in the reproduction of Macbeth Er nimmt sie an die Hand und führt sie in das Schloß, die anderen folgen. The successful collaboration continues in 2020 with The seven deadly sins. Ein Tanzabend von Pina Bausch.

== Film and television credits ==
Film and television appearances
Year	Title	Role	Notes
1998	Rose Bernd	Rose	TV adaptation of the play Rose Bernd
1999	Aimée & Jaguar	Ilse	First feature film
1999	Alma – A Show Biz ans Ende	Alma Mahler	TV mini-series, adaptation of the play Alma
2002	Das letzte Versteck	Eva	Based on The Journey by Ida Fink
2003	Emilia Galotti	Emilia Galotti	TV adaptation of the play Emilia Galotti
2003	Hierankl	Lene Thurner	
2004	Queen of Cherries	Ruth von Roll	TV mini-series
2005	Barfuss	Leila	Lead role opposite Til Schweiger
2007	Silent Resident	Anna	
2008	North Face	Luise Fellner	
2008	The Baader Meinhof Complex	Gudrun Ensslin	Won Bambi award for best German actress
2009	Pope Joan	Johanna von Ingelheim	Lead role
2010	The Coming Days	Cecilia Kuper	
2012	The Pursuit of Unhappiness	Tiffany Blechschmid	Lead role
2017	Redemption Road	Claire Kornitzer	Lead role
2017	Freedom	Nora	Lead role
2018	Wuff – Folge dem Hund	Cécile	
2019	Tatort: Falscher Hase	Anouk	TV series episode
2019	The German Lesson	Ditte Nansen	
2019	Suicide Tourist	Linda	
2020	Spy City	Ulrike Faber	

== Audiobooks ==
- 2006: Johanna Wokalek reads Franziska Linkerhand by Brigitte Reimann.
- 2008: Gretel Adorno – Walter Benjamin: Briefwechsel.
- 2009: Herzzeit: Briefwechsel. Ingeborg Bachmann – Paul Celan.
- 2009: Die Päpstin: das Hörspiel zum Film.
- 2019: Johanna Wokalek reads Laufen by Isabel Bogdan.
- 2020: Nelly B.s. Herz by Aris Fioretos.

== Awards ==
- Alfred Kerr Actor Award (1999), best new German stage actor/actress in Rose Bernd
- Förderpreis des Landes Nordrhein-Westfalen für junge Künstlerinnen und Künstler (1999) for Rose Bernd
- Nachwuchsschauspielerin des Jahres (1999), best new actor/actress in Rose Bernd
- Nestroy Theatre Prize (2002), best new actor/actress
- Förderpreis Deutscher Film (2003), best actress in Hierankl
- Bavarian Film Award (2003), best actress in a German film in Hierankl
- Shooting Stars Award (2006), announced by European Film Promotion, best new German actor/actress in Barfuss and Hierankl
- Adolf Grimme Award (2006), best performance in Hierankl, along with Barbara Sukowa, Josef Bierbichler and Peter Simonischek
- Bambi (2008), best German actress in The Baader Meinhof Complex
- DIVA (2009), best actress of the year 2008
- German Film Awards (2009), nominated as best actress for her performance in The Baader Meinhof Complex
- Grimme Prize (2018) for Redemption Road
