= Sönke Wortmann =

German film director, producer (born 1959)

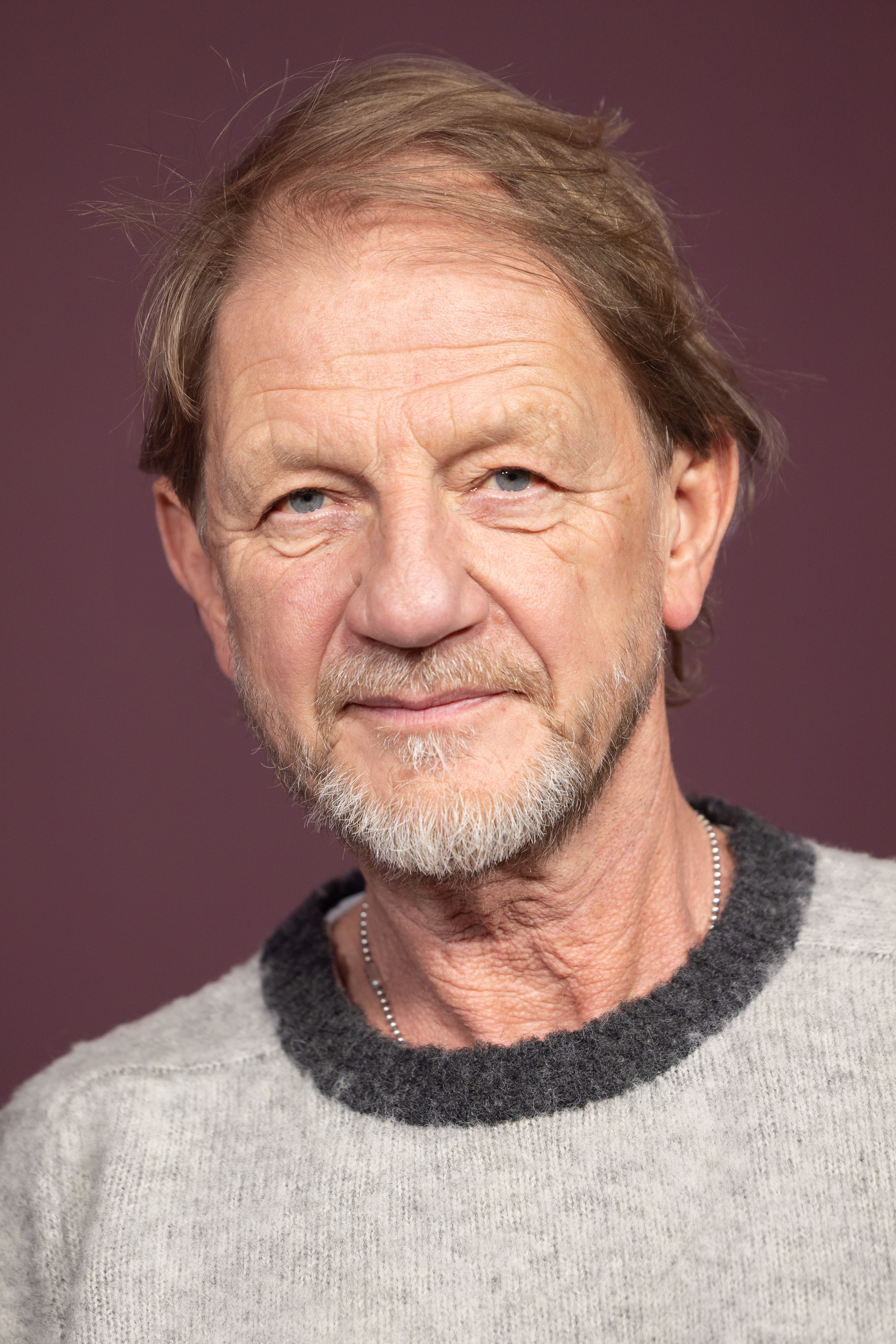
- Sönke Wortmann (2025)
- Born: 25 August 1959 (age 66); Marl, North Rhine-Westphalia, West Germany
- Occupations: Film director, Producer
- Spouse: Cecilia Kunz
- Children: 3

Sönke Wortmann (German: [ˈzøːn.kə ˈvɔʁtˌman]; 25 August 1959 in Marl, North Rhine-Westphalia) is a German film director and producer.

== Biography ==
Wortmann's father was a miner. After Wortmann's A-Levels he wanted to become a professional football player and started playing with Westfalia Herne and later SpVgg Erkenschwick in the German 3rd division. After three years he gave up the idea of becoming a professional football player.

One semester he studied sociology before entering the University of Television and Film Munich to study film directing. After spending some time at the London Royal College of Art he finished his career successfully. While studying, he worked as a taxi driver and actor, for example in the TV series Die glückliche Familie. His debut feature film Der bewegte Mann was released in 1994. It became one of the most successful German film of the post-war era.

The Superwife (1996) was filmed, as he himself said, to prove that it is possible to make "a successful film out of a successful novel". Der Campus was more or less accomplished on the same terms, but achieved fewer viewers. Films like Mr. Bluesman and the drama film in episodes St Pauli Night, for which he was acclaimed by critics, turned out to be commercial failures and didn't run a long time in cinemas. Wortmann shot The Hollywood Sign, based on Leon de Winter's novel "De hemel van Hollywood", in the US with a very good cast. The Hollywood Sign came out in 2004 in Germany, but didn't run long in cinemas. Wortmann sees The Miracle of Bern as his greatest success, which became the most successful film in German cinemas in the year 2003.

During the Confederations Cup 2005 and the Football World Cup 2006 he joined the Germany national team on their trip. At every match he sat on the trainer's bench and, by order and for account of national team manager Jürgen Klinsmann, he prepared films which were later shown to the players in order to prepare them for an upcoming match. The two-hour documentary film on the world cup, produced from over 100 hours of filming material, was presented to the Germany national football team on 14 August 2006 as a preview and premiered in cinemas on 5 December 2006 under the title Deutschland. Ein Sommermärchen. The film had more than 4 million viewers and was a big success. The net profits of the film were donated to SOS Children's Villages.

In 1998 Wortmann founded his own production company Little Shark Entertainment.

From 2007 he worked on the project to adapt the novel "Pope Joan". The production was carried out by Bernd Eichinger. Initially, the female pope Johanna was going to be portrayed by Franka Potente. In Mai 2008 though, the production company announced that Johanna Wokalek was going to play the pope. The production was also conducted under Oliver Berben. In the year 2009, the film was released in cinemas.

Sönke Wortmann is married to the actress Cecilia Kunz and has three children.

Wortmann is an active member of the German authors' national football team (Autonama). He also supports "Dein Fußballclub" since April 2008. This club's aim is to engage over 30,000 new members every year, who pay €39.95 each every year. The foundation of this club was modeled after the English club Ebbsfleet United F.C.

Sönke Wortmann is also member of Alliance '90/The Greens political party.

== Awards ==
- 1985 – Special award at the Royal College of Art in London for Nachtfahrer (Night driver)
- 1988 – Kodak-Eastmann award for Three D
- 1988 – Nomination for the Oscar category of student film for Three D
- 1988 – Filmband in gold for Noblesse oblige
- 1991 – promotional award from the Hypo-Bank for the Munich Film Festival for Alone Among Women
- 1991 – German video award for Alone Among Women
- 1992 – Filmband in gold for Little Sharks
- 1992 – Award (Best young director) at the World Film Festival for Little Sharks
- 1992 – Award (Best film) at the film festival in Quebec for Little Sharks
- 1994 – DIVA award
- 1994 – Bambi award for Der bewegte Mann
- 1995 – German film award, nomination (film, director) for Der bewegte Mann
- 1995 – Ernst Lubitsch award for Der bewegte Mann
- 1998 – Bavarian film award for Der Campus
- 2003 – Bavarian film award for The Miracle of Bern
- 2004 – Landesmedien award from North Rhine-Westphalia for The Miracle of Bern
- 2006 – Bambi for the category "Documentary" for Deutschland. Ein Sommermärchen
- 2007 – Adolf-Grimme award for the category "information and culture" for Germany for Deutschland. Ein Sommermärchen
- 2007 – Merrit award from North Rhine-Westphalia
- 2009 – culture award from the Sparkasse culture-foundation Rhine-Westphalia
- 2010 – Askania Award

== Filmography ==
=== As a director ===
- 1981: Nachtfahrer (Short)
- 1984: Anderthalb (Short)
- 1986: Fotofinish (Short)
- 1988: Three D
- 1990: Liebesgeschichten: Die Hochzeit des Figaro (TV series episode)
- 1990: A Crazy Couple (TV film)
- 1991: Alone Among Women
- 1992: Little Sharks
- 1993: Mr. Bluesman
- 1994: Der bewegte Mann (Maybe, Maybe Not) — based on comic books by Ralf König
- 1996: The Superwife — based on a novel by Hera Lind
- 1996: Charley's Aunt (TV film) — based on Charley's Aunt by Brandon Thomas
- 1998: Der Campus (Campus) — based on a novel by Dietrich Schwanitz
- 1999: St. Pauli Night — based on a novel by Frank Göhre
- 2001: The Hollywood Sign — based on a novel by Leon de Winter
- 2003: The Miracle of Bern
- 2006: Freunde für immer – Das Leben ist rund (TV series, 2 episodes)
- 2006: Deutschland. Ein Sommermärchen (Germany. A summer fairy tale)
- 2009: Pope Joan — based on Pope Joan by Donna Woolfolk Cross
- 2012: Das Hochzeitsvideo (The Wedding Video)
- 2014: Wrecked — based on a novel by Charlotte Roche
- 2015: Frau Müller muss weg! — based on a play by Lutz Hübner and Sarah Nemitz
- 2017: Charité (TV series, 6 episodes)
- 2017: Sommerfest — based on a novel by Frank Goosen
- 2018: How About Adolf? — based on a play by Alexandre de La Patellière and Matthieu Delaporte
- 2020: Contra
- 2020: Locked-in Society
- 2022: Family Affairs — sequel to How About Adolf

=== As a producer ===
- Lammbock (2001)
- The Miracle of Bern (2003)
- Arnies Welt (2005) (TV film)
- Hardcover (2008)
- Hangtime (2009)
- Eine Insel namens Udo (2011)
- Lommbock (2017)

=== As an actor ===
- 1987–1991: Die glückliche Familie (as Ritchie)
- 1997: Knocking on Heaven's Door

== Advertisements ==
- For Nike, Gerolsteiner, Bitburger, Sony, Air Berlin, Deutsche Bank, Prinzenrolle, Nivea, DFB, König Pilsener, Früh Kölsch
- Vodafone, Honda, Dresdner Bank, SolarWorld AG, Commerzbank AG
- HanseMerkur Versicherung, starring Mario Gómez (August 2007)
- AachenMünchener, starring Mario Adorf,
- Rewe Group 2010, starring Lukas Podolski
- Deutsche Bahn AG, in which he himself appears.

== Other work ==
- Deutschland. Ein Sommermärchen (2006) Diary of the World Cup
- Das Wunder von Bern, audiobook at Hörverlag, ISBN 3-89940-205-7
