= Lotte Flack =

German actress

Lotte Flack (born 14 January 1994 in Hamburg) is a German actress.

== Life ==
She is the daughter of a London-born English mother and the German comic artist Eckart Breitschuh and thus has dual German and British nationality. She has two younger brothers and lives with her family in the Hamburg district of St. Pauli.

Her first acting role was aged 11 and she trained in acting from 2005 to 2008 at the TASK–Schauspielschule für Kinder und Jugendliche in Hamburg. In 2007 she played Mattie Evers, a farmer's daughter, in the ZDF comedy Der Mann im Heuhaufen, directed by Dagmar Damek. In the sixth season of Die Pfefferkörner in 2008 in the episode Falsche Freunde she played the young thief Anna. In the 2009 film Pope Joan she played the title role as a child, due to her resemblance to the actress playing the role as an adult, Johanna Wokalek. In the 2009 ARD Christmas fairytale Dornröschen she played the title role. Flack is also notable for her appearances in advertising (Die Tagesschau erklärt die Welt) and as the voice artist on the English-language CDs for the Hamburger Schulbehörde.
