= Dorothy Woolfolk =

American comic book editor (1913-2000)

- Born: Dorothy Gertrude Roubicek; October 1, 1913 New York City
- Died: November 27, 2000 (aged 87) Newport News, Virginia
- Areas: Writer, Editor
- Pseudonym: Dorothy Manning
- Notable works: Kryptonite
- Awards: Bill Finger Award

Dorothy Woolfolk née Dorothy Roubicek (October 1, 1913 – November 27, 2000) was one of the first women in the American comic-book industry. As an editor at DC Comics, one of the two largest companies in the field, during the 1940s period historians and fans call the Golden Age of Comic Books, she is credited with helping to create the fictional metal Kryptonite in the Superman mythos.

== Biography ==
=== Early life and education ===
Born Dorothy Gertrude Roubicek in New York City, she was the daughter of Czech Jewish immigrant, Josef Roubíček, from Čejtice, and his wife, Anna née Pollack, from Grodno, Russian Empire (today, Belarus). Woolfolk was a New York City high school graduate who never attended college but nonetheless won prizes on a 1950s television game show.

=== Editor ===
She served from 1942 to 1944 as an editor at All-American Publications, one of the three companies that would merge to form the present-day DC, before Julius Schwartz took over, then spent the next two years at Timely Comics, the 1940s predecessor to Marvel Comics, and in 1948 was an editor at EC Comics.

Woolfolk said in 1993 that she had found Superman's invulnerability dull, and that DC's flagship hero might be more interesting with an Achilles' heel such as adverse reactions to a fragment of his home planet. This gave rise to the famous fictional metal kryptonite, which made its first appearance in the comics in the story "Superman Returns To Krypton!", credited to writer Bill Finger, in Superman #61 (Dec. 1949).

After raising children Donald and Donna, the latter of whom would become an author, Woolfolk briefly returned to comics in the 1970s, editing Wonder Woman, Supergirl, Superman's Girl Friend, Lois Lane, Young Romance, and other DC superhero and romance titles from 1971 to 1974. Comics artist Alan Kupperberg, who worked with her at DC Comics in the 1970s, said in 2001,

Dorothy Woolfolk really was something... Tallulah Bankhead, the Auntie Mame of comics. I thought her books looked good and she got them out on time. People like Liz Safian got breaks through Dorothy. Not to mention Sal Amendola, Howard Chaykin, Mary Skrenes, and Alan Weiss.

Her assistant editor at DC, Ethan Mordden, would go on to become a notable LBGT author.

=== Writer ===
She also occasionally scripted comics, including an unknown number of Wonder Woman stories in the 1940s — making Woolfolk the first female writer of that series, and, with Ruth Atkinson and Ruth Roche, among comic books' first female writers. Woolfolk also wrote for the science fiction magazine Orbit during the 1950s, and in the 1970s and early 1980s was the author of the 10-book Scholastic Press young-adult novel series about teen detective Donna Rockford.

== Personal life ==
Her second husband was 1930s comic-strip cartoonist and 1940s comic-book writer Walter Galli. She met her third husband, novelist William Woolfolk, during her stint at DC, when she rejected a script he had submitted for a Superman comic book.

Woolfolk's daughter, Donna Woolfolk Cross, is also an author; her work includes the historical novel Pope Joan (Ballantine, 1996).

Woolfolk, who lived on the Upper West Side of Manhattan while working in comics and as an author, moved to Norfolk, Virginia, in 1996. Two years later, she began to reside at the St. Francis Nursing Center in Newport News, Virginia, and died at Mary Immaculate Hospital in that city on November 27, 2000.

== Awards ==
Woolfolk was nominated every year from 2001 to 2004 for induction into the Women Cartoonists Hall of Fame.

In 2018, Woolfolk won the 2018 Bill Finger Award from San Diego Comic-Con.

== See also ==
- Women in comics

== Books ==
=== Donna Rockford Mystery series ===
- The Girl Cried Murder (original title: "Murder, My Dear!"; Scholastic, 1974) 1983 reissue: ISBN 978-0-590-05810-0
- Murder in Washington and the Body on the Beach — Donna Rockford Double Mystery Series (Scholastic, 1982) ISBN 0-590-32000-9
- Mother Where Are You? (Scholastic, 1982) ISBN 0-590-32519-1
- Who Killed Daddy? (Scholastic, 1982) ISBN 0-590-32520-5
- Death of a Dancer (Scholastic, 1982) ISBN 0-590-30955-2
- Murder by Moonlight (Scholastic, 1983) ISBN 978-0-590-32438-0
- How to Look Like a Winner (Scholastic, 1983) ISBN 0-590-31332-0
- Abbey Is Missing (Scholastic, 1983) ISBN 0-590-32864-6
- Mystery in Studio 13 (Scholastic, 1984) ISBN 0-590-32865-4
