= The Superwife =

- Directed by: Sönke Wortmann
- Written by: Hera Lind (novel); Gundula Leni Ohngemach; Jürgen Egger
- Produced by: Bernd Eichinger; Martin Moszkowicz; Norbert Preuss
- Starring: Veronica Ferres; Joachim Król; Richy Müller
- Cinematography: Tom Fährmann
- Edited by: Ueli Christen
- Production company: Constantin Film
- Distributed by: Constantin Film
- Release date: 7 March 1996
- Running time: 86 minutes
- Country: West Germany
- Language: German
- Box office: 24.4 million Deutsch Mark (Germany)

The Superwife (German: Das Superweib) is a 1996 German comedy film directed by Sönke Wortmann and starring Veronica Ferres, Joachim Król and Richy Müller. Veteran star Liselotte Pulver appears in a supporting role.

== Cast ==
- Veronica Ferres as Franziska
- Esther Schweins as Sonja Sonne
- Til Schweiger as Hajo Heiermann
- Maren Kroymann as Frau Schäufele
- Richy Müller as Papai
- Heiner Lauterbach as Viktor Lange
- Liselotte Pulver as Alma Winkel
- Joachim Król as Enno Winkel
- Thomas Heinze as Will Gross
- Jonathan Beck as Willi
- Marco Bretscher-Coschignano as Franz
- Arabella Kiesbauer as Conferenciere
- Burghart Klaußner as Rudi Fährenberg
- Anya Hoffmann as Dorothea
- Pierre Sanoussi-Bliss as Lauro
- Armin Rohde as Postbote
- Nele Mueller-Stöfen as Moderatorin
- Sebastian Kalhammer as Radio Assi
- Nina Bagusat as Ute
- Katharina von Martius as Kostümbildnerin
- Carolin Fink as Sabine Koczinski
- Chantal Plazczek as Katinka
- Simon Beckord as Papais Sohn
- Corinna Beilharz as Junge Schwäbin
- Barbara Rath as Elegante Schwäbin
- Christiane Blumhoff as Strickende Schwäbin
- Claudia Casoni as Sabine
- Jenny Schmeer as Brillenschlange
- Ursula Gottwald as Kassenschlampe
- Sabrina White as Die visuell Dramatische
- Stefan von Moers as Wills Anwalt
- Johann von Bülow as Ticketer
- Roland Hoffmann as Arzt
- Katharina von Johnstone as Hajos Schnalle
- Nina Schwarz as Verlagsdame
- Cornelius Hirsch as Arzt
- Birgit Brandes as Ennos Assi
- Katrin Fröhlich as Fitness-Frau
- Deborah Schober as Fitness-Frau
- Heini Göbel as Macho-Opa
- Hera Lind as Glückliche Mutter

== Reception ==
The film was the third most popular German film of the year with admissions of 2.3 million and a gross of 24.4 million Deutsch Mark, behind only Werner: Eat My Dust!!! and Jailbirds and the eleventh highest-grossing overall for the year.

== Bibliography ==
- Mattias Frey. Postwall German Cinema: History, Film History and Cinephilia. Berghahn Books, 2013.
