= William Woolfolk =

American novelist

- Born: June 25, 1917; Center Moriches, New York, U.S.
- Died: July 20, 2003 (aged 86); Syracuse, New York, U.S.
- Education: New York University
- Occupation: Novelist
- Spouse(s): m. 1946 to (2nd wife) Dorothy Roubicek Woolfolk; then to Joanna Martine Woolfolk (3rd Wife)
- Children: daughter Donna Woolfolk Cross and a stepson, Dr. Donald Irwin Woolfolk
- Writing career
- Notable awards: Inkpot Award 2002

William "Bill" Woolfolk (June 25, 1917 – July 20, 2003) was born in 1917, the son of William (a theatrical manager) and Mary (an actress; maiden name, Lyon) Woolfolk. Bill Woolfolk was an American novelist, television writer and comic book author who wrote stories for many popular wartime comic-book characters, including Captain Marvel and Blackhawk. Bill Woolfolk was known for his range of writing output, having achieved success in the areas of comic books, novels, and television screenwriting. He died of congestive heart failure on July 20, 2003, in a Syracuse, NY, hospital at the age of 86.

The author's 19 books of fiction and nonfiction sold more than 6 million copies and included eight Book of the Month Club selections. Yet he never became well known in literary circles. Woolfolk, who sometimes wrote under pseudonyms, humorously attributed his anonymity to his remarkable versatility.

Woolfolk began his career as an advertising copywriter from 1938 to 1940, then as a freelance writer for magazines from 1940 to 1942, after graduating from New York University. He was lured into writing for television by his friend, Reginald Rose, author of the screenplay “Twelve Angry Men,” for the television series “The Defenders,” starring E. G. Marshall and Robert Reed as father and son lawyers. Woolfolk served as story editor and chief scriptwriter for the show, which ran from 1961 to 1965, and two of his scripts -- “A Book for Burning,” about censorship, and “All the Silent Voices,” about birth control—were nominated for Emmy Awards.

== Comic books ==
Inside Story June 1955 edition

Woolfolk was a friend of Seymour Reit, the creator of Casper the Friendly Ghost, who suggested that he write for Will Eisner and Jerry Iger's company, which produced the Spirit and Blackhawk comics. At a time when comics were still a crude, amateurish art form, the Eisner stable included the artists Jack Cole, Lou Fine and Reed Crandall, known for their impeccable craft and their work's fine line and proportions. Mr. Woolfolk became their collaborator.

Woolfolk worked in the comic book business, starting with MLJ Magazines, from 1941 through 1954, with time out for military service. He rose in the business to become one of the highly paid writers of comic books, earning $300 a week, ten times the average salary. Woolfolk toiled for several companies, including Detective Comics (Batman and Superman); Fawcett Comics (Bulletman, Captain Marvel and Captain Marvel Jr.); Quality Comics (Blackhawk and Plastic Man); and Timely Comics, the precursor to Marvel Comics (Captain America and the Sub-Mariner). He is credited with creating Captain Marvel's "Holy Moley!" catchphrase. He also worked for Archie Comics, National Comics and Orbit Publications.

After serving in the Army during part of World War II, Bill became a freelance writer for several magazines, eventually joining the staff of Shock Illustrated and founding the astronautics magazine Space World.

In 1944, William "Bill" Woolfolk and John Gerard "Jack" Oxton Sr., an Illustrator and Film Editor at Paramount News/Paramount Pictures in New York City, together co-founded their own comic book company, O.W. Comics, which stood for Oxton & Woolfolk. Woolfolk, the Editor, and Oxton, the President, operated their publishing company, O.W. Comics, Corp., initially at 150 Nassau Street, then at 270 Broadway in New York City, New York in the mid to late-1940's.

By 1945, Woolfolk and Oxton had also co-created the comic books Mad Hatter Vol. I, No. 1 (January–February, 1946), Mad Hatter Vol. I, No. 2 (September–October, 1946), and the comic book Animal Fables.

Victims of the acute paper rationing of 1945-1949 which bankrupted many U.S. Publishing Companies during World War II, O.W. Comics Corp., had bought a catalogue business in order to get their paper rations during the war. They intended for the comic book series Mad Hatter to be published bi-monthly. However, Mad Hatter only lasted two series (Mad Hatter #1 & #2 were both released in 1946), after the printing company O.W. Comics, Corp. had contracted with screwed up their order. Instead of printing the 48-page Comic Book that had been planned and contracted for, the printing company produced a flimsy 32-pager, which required the comic pages to be eliminated from the finished stories, and the results were dreadful. Lawsuits were instituted against the printing firm by Oxton & Woolfolk, as well as many other publishers of the time, but the damage had already been done. M.C. Gaines bought out Animal Fables and turned it into a successful book, but O.W. Comics, Corp., sadly folded.

Bill Woolfolk became famed as "The Shakespeare of Comics" during the Golden Age of Comics. After a decade of working at Fawcett, Detective Comics editor Mort Weisinger hired Woolfolk for Superman, a marketplace rival of Captain Marvel, one of the titles Woolfolk worked on. At the same time of his hiring, he was also working for Orbit and Timely and freelancing articles and stories to mainstream magazines. He accepted the offer to gain security. However, he clashed with Weisinger and continued to freelance with a wide variety of publishers.

At the request of Kable News, he became a periodical publisher in 1955, launching the monthly gossip magazine Inside Story as a rival to Confidential. It eventually became the second best-selling scandal sheet in the trade. He eventually left publishing for novel writing and to work in television.

Woolfolk told the anthology Contemporary Authors:

"Writing during the so-called Golden Age of comics, I soon became the best paid and most sought-after writer (there was little competition) in the field. I wrote for all the characters now so nostalgically remembered: Captain Marvel, Superman, Batman, Captain Midnight, Blackhawk, Plastic Man and many others. This work paid so well, was so easy to do, and so much fun, that my versatility might have come to an end forever. But the Golden Age passed, and I moved on."

In 2002, he was awarded the Inkpot Award at San Diego Comic-Con.

== Television writer ==
Woolfolk became a TV screenwriter, primarily working on the courtroom drama The Defenders, where he also was a script editor. A 1965 episode he wrote, "All the Silent Voices", was one of the first to deal with birth control. In 1964, he was nominated for Writers Guild of America award in 1964 for Episodic TV Drama for The Defenders episode "A Book for Burning".

He also worked on the crime drama Arrest and Trial, a show that was a forerunner of Law & Order. In the first half of each 90-minute episode, a detective (Ben Gazzara) investigated a crime, while in the second half, a member of the District Attorney's office (Chuck Connors) tried the case. The series lasted only one season in 1963–1964.

== Novelist ==
Though his first novel, The Naked Hunter, was published in 1953, it was not until 1962 that he published his first hardcover book, when Doubleday issued My Name is Morgan (1962), which was based on the life of Mike Todd. Most of his novels dealt with characters based on actual people, romans à clef limning the lives of celebrities, including "The Beautiful Couple" (1968), a bestseller evocative of the life of Todd's former wife Elizabeth Taylor and her fifth husband Richard Burton; The Builders (1969), based on the construction of the Seagram Building, featured characters based on the Modernist architect William Lescaze and the real estate developer William Zeckendorf; and Maggie (1971), based on the relationship of newspaper publisher William Randolph Hearst and his movie star mistress Marion Davies.

Woolfolk wrote TV tie-ins based on the Batman TV series: Batman vs. Three Villains of Doom (1966) (an amalgamation of three older comic-book stories, updated with elements from the TV series) and Batman vs. the Fearsome Foursome (a direct novelization of the feature film based on the series).

Woolfolk also wrote two major books of nonfiction: The Great American Birth Rite (1975), co-authored with his 3rd wife, Joanna Martine Woolfolk, about child raising; and Daddy's Little Girl: The Unspoken Bargain Between Fathers and Their Daughters (1982), co-written with his daughter, the novelist Donna Woolfolk Cross (Pope Joan).

“A daughter is a father’s link to immortality,” he wrote in that book. “She is what he has contributed to the world.”

Woolfolk died of congestive heart failure in Syracuse, New York, in 2003. At the time of his death, his novels had sold over six million copies, and eight had been selected by the Book of the Month Club.

In his interview with Contemporary Authors, Woolfolk summed up his writing career:

No literary monuments have ever been erected that proclaim: 'He was versatile'. No one looks forward to a new book by William Woolfolk because no one, including the author, knows what it will be.

He claimed that his comic books work outshone his other literary production.
