= Rose Bernd (play) =

Play written by Gerhart Hauptmann

Rose Bernd is a stage drama in five acts by Gerhart Hauptmann. It premiered on 31 October 1903 in Berlin.

== Characters ==
- Bernd – deacon
- Rose Bernd – older daughter
- Marthel – younger daughter
- Christopher Flamm – landowner and magistrate
- Mrs. Flamm – wife to Flamm
- Arthur Streckmann – machinist
- August Keil – bookbinder
- Hahn, Heinzel, Golisch, Kleinert – field labourers
- Old Mrs. Golisch
- the head maid servant
- the assistant maid servant
- a constable

== Plot ==
Rose Bernd speaks to a friend, Flamm, with whom she is now uncomfortable. He flirts with her: "Rosie, give me your dear, good, faithful little paw. By heaven, Rosie! Look here, I'm a deucedly queer fellow! I'm damned fond of my dear old woman; that's as true as ..." Rose hides her face in her arm and says: "You make me want to die o' shame." Flamm complains of his wife: "Nine solid years she's been bedridden; at most she creeps around in a wheel chair.- Confound it all, what good is that sort o' thing to me?" Later, Streckman greets her, and insinuates he knows of her doings under a field-crucifix with Squire Flamm from Diessdorf.

Father Bernd, a deacon, wishes Rose to marry August Keil, a bookbinder, whose health is weak. Rose intimates it would be better to delay the wedding, already the case for 3 years! Keil takes the matter in good stride: "I'm made for misfortune! An' that's what I've always told you, Father Bernd, in spite of it all I've taken thought an' I've worked an' God has given his blessin' so that I've not fallen by the wayside. But I can weep; these things aren't for me!" Father Bernd and Keil leave, disappointed. Mrs Flamm seeks to find out the reason behind Rose's delays, and guesses that she is pregnant. Having lost a son, Mrs Flamm, alone, exclaims: "Ah, lass, 'tis a good fortune that you have, not an evil! There's none that's greater for a woman! Hold it fast!" Finally, Rose decides to marry Keil, with Flamm's baby inside her belly. Rose admits loving Flamm, and he loves her, but, he being married, the situation is hopeless.

Streckmann returns, and Rose accuses him: "I ran to you in the awful terror o' my heart! An' I begged you for the love o' God not to put nothin' between me an' August. I crept on my knees before you- an' you say, you, I ran after you! What was it truly? You committed a crime- a crime against me! An' that's worse'n a scoundrel's trick! 'Twas a crime- doubly and trebly! An' the Lord'll bring it home to you!" Streckmann jealously says: "I'm as good as Flamm. An' I don't want no more goin's on between you an' him!" Rose answers: "I'll jump into his bed, scoundrel! An' it wouldn't concern you that much!" She continues her accusations: "You pounced on me like a wild beast! I know! I tried to get out by the door! An' you took hold an' you rent my bodice an' my skirt! I bled! I might ha' gotten out by the door!" Bernd and Keil hear part of Rose's accusations. Baited, Streckmann strikes back, hitting Keil and calling Rose "a wench that's common to anybody as wants her...." Keil loses an eye.

In their home, Mr and Mrs Flamm discuss his adultery. Later, Mrs Flamm attempts to hear Rose about the court proceedings, Father Bernd taking Streckmann to court for slandering his daughter. Rose failed to contradict Strackmann, for which Mrs. Flamm accuses her: "An' didn't you tell the truth, girl? You lied when you were under oath, maybe?- Haven't you any idea what that means an' what you've done? How did you happen to do that? How could you think o' such a thing?, whereupon Rose cries out brokenly: "I was so ashamed!" In Bernd's cottage, Keil tells him: "Father, you'll have to withdraw your suit." He refuses. Keil retorts: "Our Rose habeen but a weak human bein' like others." Bernd is stunned and answers confusedly : "No. I don't understand you rightly!" Rose arrives. Bernd is bitter against her, but Keil will stand by her, though worried about her perjury. Rose cries out: "O Jesus, Jesus, what did I do? Why did I go an' creep home? Why didn't I stay with my little baby?" Stunned that she had given birth, Keil asks: "With whom?" When a constable arrives to sign papers related to the court proceedings, Rose confesses to the murder of her baby.

== TV adaptations ==
It has been adapted for TV four times, in 1919, 1957, 1962 and 1998. The 1998 version, directed by Valentin Jeker, featured Johanna Wokalek as Rose Bernd. Wokalek received three newcomer awards and wide critical recognition for her performance in the play.
