= Katja Eichinger =

German author and journalist

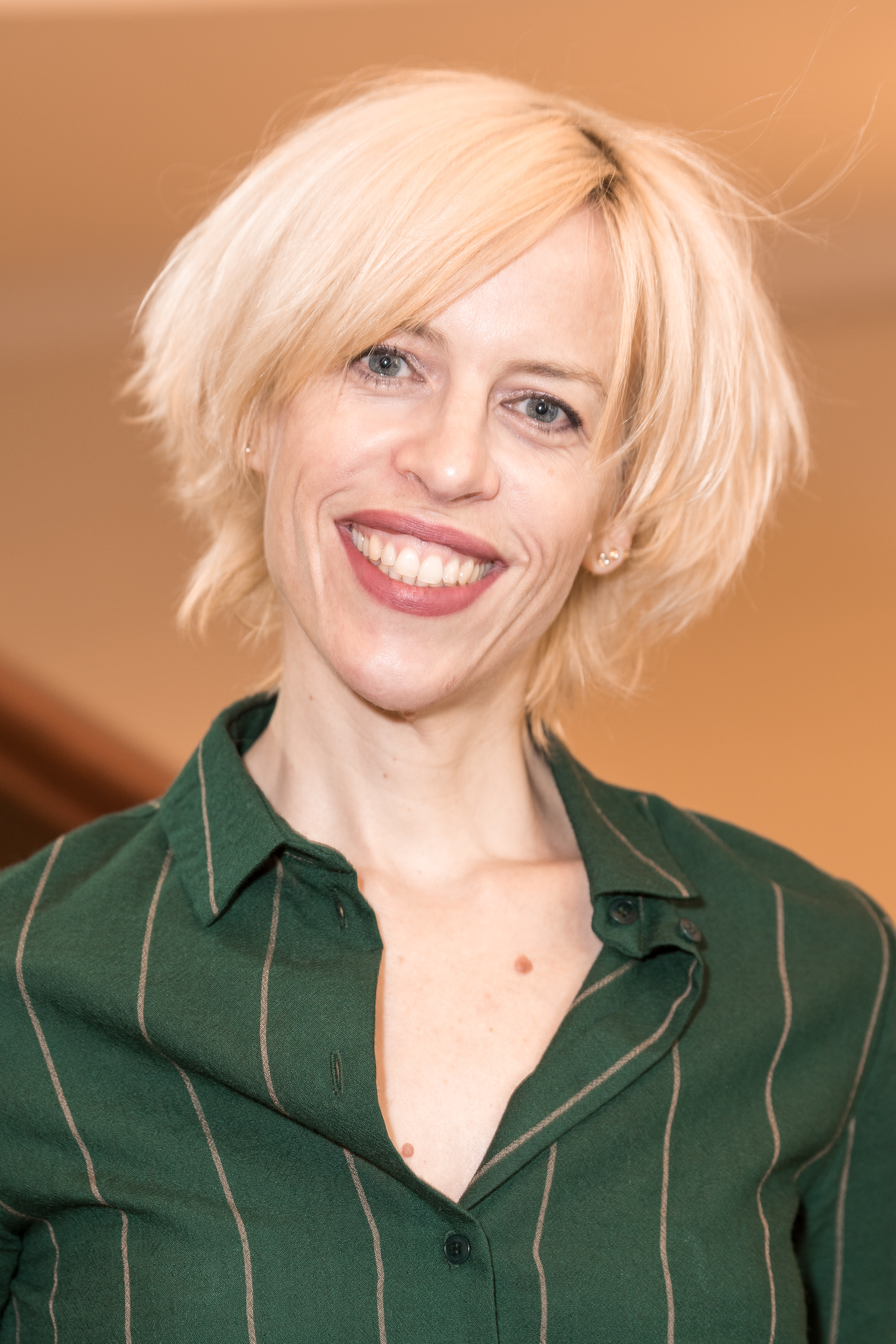
- Eichinger in 2018
- Born: 20 April 1971 (age 54); Kassel, Germany
- Occupations: Author, journalist
- Spouse: Bernd Eichinger (m. 2006; died 2011)

Katja Eichinger (née Hofmann; born 20 April 1971) is a German author and journalist.

== Early life and education ==
Born in Kassel, Eichinger graduated from the British Film Institute's MA programme in 1995.

== Career ==
Early in her career, Eichinger worked as a journalist specializing in film and popular culture writing, amongst others, for Variety, Esquire, Financial Times, The Independent on Sunday, Dazed & Confused and German Vogue.

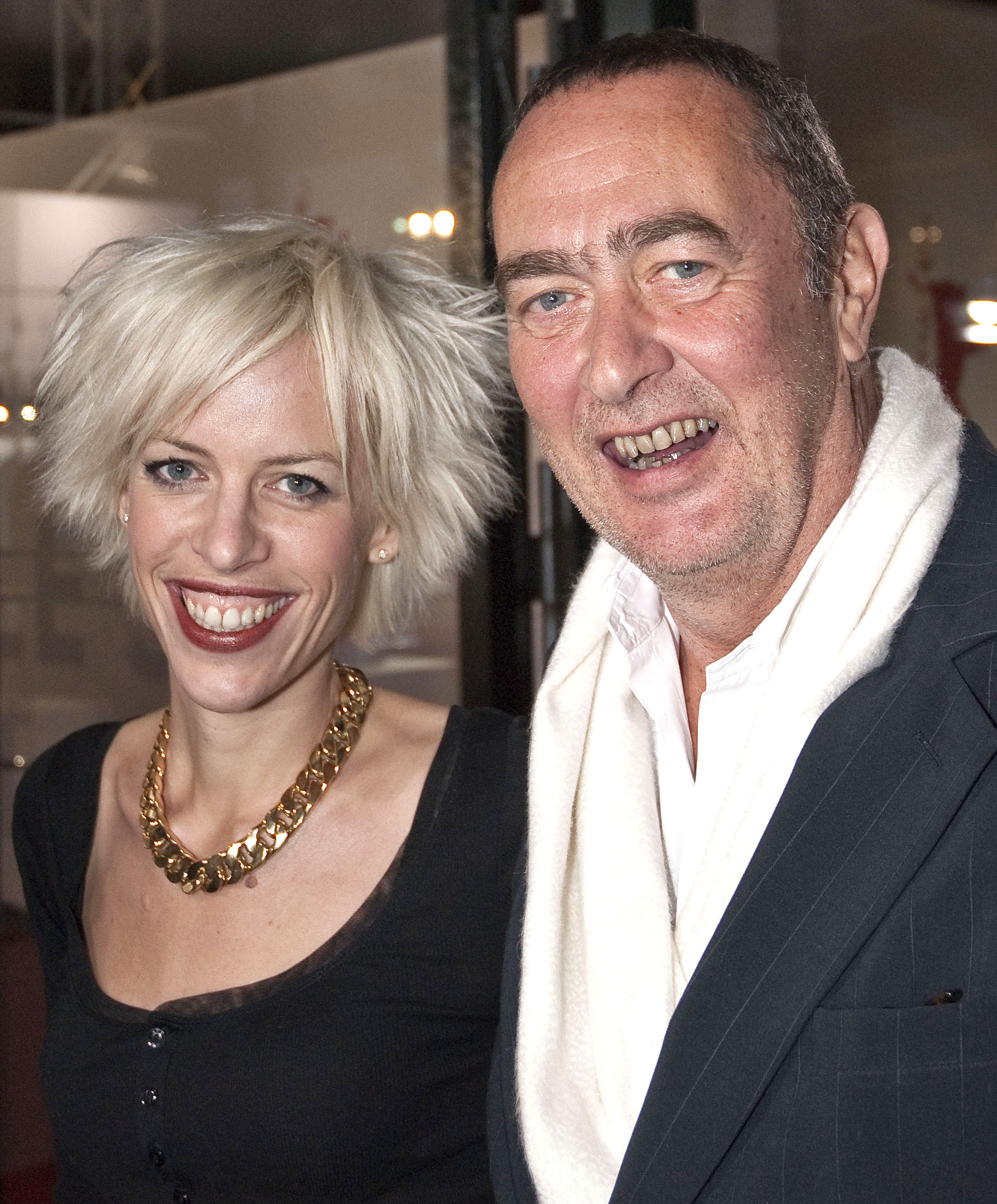
Katja and Bernd Eichinger in 2008

In 2008, she published Der Baader Meinhof Komplex. Das Buch zum Film a book about the making of the Oscar-nominated film The Baader Meinhof Complex written and produced by her husband Bernd Eichinger and directed by Uli Edel.

Following her husband’s fatal heart attack in January 2011, Eichinger wrote his biography BE. The book features interviews with many of Bernd Eichinger’s friends and collaborators, including Wim Wenders, Werner Herzog, Tom Tykwer and Uli Edel. It also contains interviews with Marvel founder Stan Lee and Roger Corman, detailing the story of the original Fantastic Four film, which Bernd Eichinger had produced for $1 million in order not to lose the film rights for the Marvel comic.

In March 2014, Eichinger's first novel (German title Amerikanisches Solo ) was published by Metrolit Verlag, Berlin. It tells the story of Harry Cubs, a famous musician, who develops a fixation on his new neighbour and eventually locks her up in the panic room of his Hollywood mansion.

Eichinger is also producing the Werner Herzog film Vernon God Little based on the booker prize-winning novel of the same title by DBC Pierre.

== Other activities ==
- Bernd Eichinger Prize, Member of the Jury
- C/O Berlin, Member of the Advisory Board

== Bibliography ==
- Katja Eichinger: Der Baader-Meinhof-Komplex, Das Buch zum Film. Hoffmann und Campe, Hamburg 2008, ISBN 978-3455500967.
- Katja Eichinger: BE. Hoffmann und Campe, Hamburg 2012, ISBN 978-3455502534.
- Katja Eichinger: Amerikanisches Solo. Metrolit, 2014, ISBN 978-3849303365.
