= Deutschland. Ein Sommermärchen =

- Directed by: Sönke Wortmann
- Written by: Sönke Wortmann
- Produced by: Tom Spiess
- Starring: Jürgen Klinsmann; Joachim Löw; Oliver Bierhoff; Germany national football team
- Cinematography: Sönke Wortmann; Frank Griebe
- Release date: October 2006
- Running time: 110 minutes
- Country: Germany
- Language: German

Deutschland. Ein Sommermärchen (Germany. A Summer's Tale) is a 2006 documentary film written, filmed and directed by Sönke Wortmann. The film records the Germany national football team's World Cup 2006 journey, from their boot camp in Sardinia to the match for third place with Portugal. The title refers ironically to Heinrich Heine's poem Germany. A Winter's Tale. In contrast to Heine's melancholic view on Germany, Ein Sommermärchen illustrates the sanguine and optimistic atmosphere during the 2006 World Cup.

The film premiered in October 2006, German Unity Day. By the end November 2006, around four million people had seen the film in German cinemas, making it the most commercially successful German documentary film. The film was shown on 6 December 2006 on German public TV channel ARD, and was viewed by more than 10 million people. The DVD was released on 8 February 2007. Parts of the proceeds of the film's merchandising are earmarked for SOS Children's Villages.

== Technical sheet ==
- Original title : Deutschland. Ein Sommermärchen
- Directed by: Sönke Wortmann
- Written by: Sönke Wortmann
- Cinematography: Sönke Wortmann and Frank Griebe
- Sound: Henry Mayr
- Editing: Melania Singer, Christian von Lüpke
- Music: Marcel Barsotti
- Production:
  - Susan Feikes, Matthias Kremin (executive production)
  - Tom Spieß (production)
  - Heinrich Hadding (creative production)
- Production companies: Little Shark Entertainment, Westdeutscher Rundfunk
- Distributor (theatrical): Kinowelt
- Country of origin: Germany
- Original language: German
- Format: Color — 35 mm — 1.85:1 — Dolby Digital sound
- Genre: Sports documentary
- Release dates:
  - Germany: 3 October 2006 in theaters

== Cast ==
=== National team coaching staff ===
- Jürgen Klinsmann
- Joachim Löw
- Andreas Köpke
- Oliver Bierhoff
- Adolf Katzenmeier (physiotherapist)
- Oliver Schmidtlein (physiotherapist)

== Players ==
- Jens Lehmann
- Marcell Jansen
- Arne Friedrich
- Robert Huth
- Sebastian Kehl
- Jens Nowotny
- Bastian Schweinsteiger
- Torsten Frings
- Mike Hanke
- Oliver Neuville
- Miroslav Klose
- Oliver Kahn
- Michael Ballack
- Gerald Asamoah
- Thomas Hitzlsperger
- Philipp Lahm
- Per Mertesacker
- Tim Borowski
- Bernd Schneider
- Lukas Podolski
- Christoph Metzelder
- David Odonkor
- Timo Hildebrand

=== Others ===
- Angela Merkel
- Horst Köhler
- Franz Beckenbauer
- Gerhard Mayer-Vorfelder
- Harald Stenger
