= David Blondel =

French minister and theologian (1590–1655)

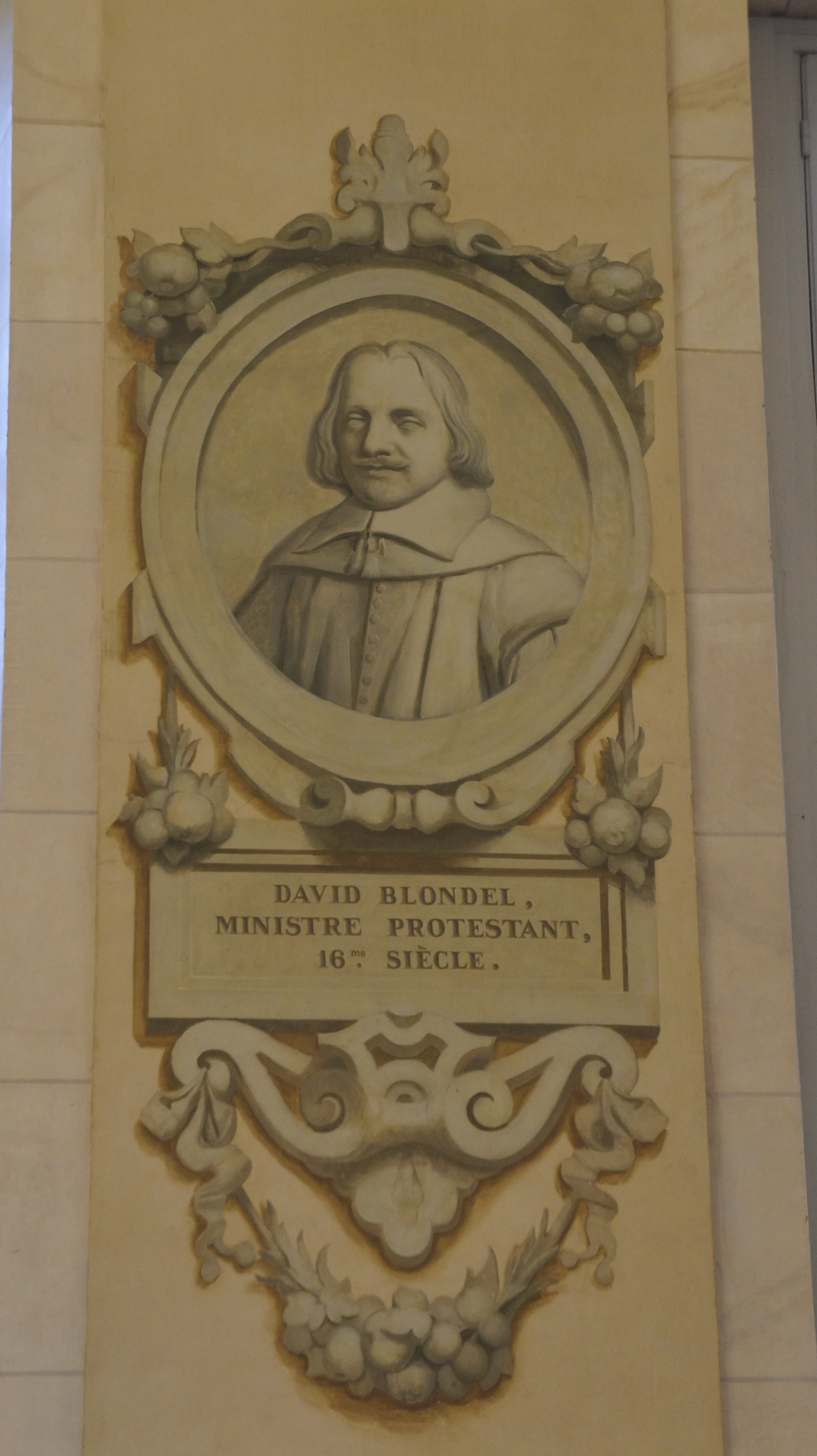
David Blondel, Chalons Town Hall

David Blondel (1591 – 6 April 1655) was a French Protestant clergyman, historian and classical scholar.

== Life ==
He was born at Châlons-en-Champagne. Ordained in 1614, he had positions as parish priest at Houdan and Roucy. After 1644, he was relieved of duties, and supported free to study full-time.

In 1650 he succeeded GJ Vossius in the professorship of history at the university of Amsterdam. His students included Francis Turretin, and Johann Georg Graevius.

== Works ==
His works were very numerous. In some of them he took a strong critical line with mythological and counterfeit material current as fact in the early modern period. This brought him the admiration of major Enlightenment intellectuals. Jonathan Israel writes:

...the real work of discrediting and disposing of the Oracula Sibyllina, Chaldean chronicles, and Orphic hymns, ... seemingly only began, as Diderot noted in 1751, in the 1650s when the Huguenot scholar David Blondel ... published his treatise on the Oracula in Amsterdam.

In his dissertation on Pope Joan (1647), he came to the conclusion, now generally accepted, that the story is a myth. Edward Gibbon wrote this in The History Of The Decline And Fall Of The Roman Empire:

She was annihilated by two learned protestants, Blondel and Bayle [...]

Indignation against him on account of this book came from Protestant polemicists.

His 1628 book against Francisco Torres conclusively demonstrated that the Pseudo-Isidorian Decretals were a very learned forgery. This work was praised by Voltaire, writing in his Dictionnaire Philosophique. Blondel tracked down sources actually used by the Pseudo-Isidore. Later scholarship has sustained his conclusions.

In a work written as he was going blind, he struck back against Jean-Jacques Chifflet, who had written in favour of the Spanish royal family's genealogical claims, over those of the French kings. In 1655 he produced an anthology of extracts arguing for Protestant eirenicism.
