= Jean de Mailly =

13th-century Dominican monk and chronicler

Jean Pierier of Mailly, called Jean de Mailly, was a Dominican chronicler working in Metz in the mid-13th century. In his Latin chronicle of the Diocese of Metz, Chronica universalis Mettensis, the fable of Pope Joan first appears in written form. He is also the compiler of the Abbreviatio in gestis sanctorum, a collection of legends about the saints which is an important forerunner of the Golden Legend.

== Editions ==
Jean de Mailly, Abbreviatio in gestis et miraculis sanctorum. Supplementum hagiographicum. Ed. Giovanni Paolo Maggioni (Florence, SISMEL/Edizioni del Galluzzo, 2013). ISBN 978-88-8450-368-8.
