= Pope Joan (1972 film) =

1972 film by Michael Anderson

- Directed by: Michael Anderson
- Written by: John Briley
- Produced by: Kurt Unger; Daniel Unger (uncredited); John Briley (associate producer); Leonard C. Lane (executive producer)
- Starring: Liv Ullmann; Olivia de Havilland; Franco Nero
- Cinematography: Billy Williams
- Edited by: Bill Lenny
- Music by: Maurice Jarre
- Distributed by: Columbia-Warner Distributors (UK) Columbia Pictures (US)
- Release date: 16 August 1972
- Running time: 132 minutes (original uncut version)
- Country: United Kingdom
- Language: English

Pope Joan is a 1972 British historical drama film based on the story of Pope Joan. Even though modern consensus generally considers Pope Joan to be legendary, in the film her existence is treated as fact.

It was directed by Michael Anderson and has a cast which includes Liv Ullmann (in the lead role), Olivia de Havilland, Lesley-Anne Down, Franco Nero and Maximilian Schell. The soundtrack was composed by Maurice Jarre with additional choral music provided by The Sistine Chapel Choir, directed by Domenico Bartolucci.

The film was released on DVD in 2003 on Region 1 format disc. It was also re-titled in some areas as The Devil's Imposter, with much material cut.

The version of the film released in 1972 differed significantly from the version that had originally been filmed. Anderson's original was made with flashbacks and flash-forward sequences about a modern-day Evangelical preacher who believes her life parallels that of Pope Joan. In this version psychiatrists try to send her back through her past lives to establish if she is the reincarnation of Pope Joan. However, the distributor decided to have all of the contemporary sequences removed and released the film as a straightforward historical drama. In 2009, the film was re-edited: the previously unreleased footage set in the 20th century was re-inserted, while some of the footage of Joan as pope was removed. The film was then re-released under the title She… Who Would Be Pope.

== Background ==
Roger Greenspun summed up the legend in The New York Times:

In some medieval histories of the Roman Catholic Church there was a gap between the pontificates of Leo IV (847‐ 855) and his successor, Benedict III. Possibly to explain this gap, a legend grew up concerning a woman, Joan, born near Mainz, educated in Athens, who went to Rome disguised as a monk and so impressed Leo with her wit and learning that, thinking her a man, he appointed her his secretary and made her a cardinal. Upon his death, she was elected pope. But her pontificate was brief for when the people discovered that she was a woman, they barbarously murdered her outside the Lateran Palace. Although the legend has been discounted by church historians for centuries, it has been the source of several fictional accounts—none, I suspect, weirder than Michael Anderson's Pope Joan, which opened yesterday.

== Cast ==
- Liv Ullmann as Pope Joan
- Olivia de Havilland as Mother Superior
- Lesley-Anne Down as Cecilia
- Trevor Howard as Pope Leo IV
- Jeremy Kemp as Joan's Father
- Patrick Magee as Elder Monk
- Franco Nero as Louis
- Maximilian Schell as Brother Adrian
- Martin Benson as Lothair
- Terrence Hardiman as Cardinal Anastasius
- André Morell as Emperor Louis the Pious
- Derek Farr as Count Brisini
- Richard Pearson as Father Timothy
- Margareta Pogonat as Village Woman
- Richard Bebb as Lord of Manor
- John Shrapnel as Father James
- Natasha Nicolescu as Joan's Mother
- Sharon Winter as Young Joan

== Reception ==
In The New York Times, Roger Greenspun wrote:

Joan's vocation may be to serve God, but her temptation is always to satisfy men. The men show up surely enough — the artistic Benedictine brother Adrian (Maximilian Schell); the fiery Louis, her favorite (Franco Nero), and great grandson, no less, of Charlemagne—and never more regularly than at the convent where Joan passes her adolescent girlhood. It is an outrageous convent, wild despite the efforts of Olivia de Havilland as Mother Superior to keep things ladylike, and its novices might have been penitents from the cast of Sex Kittens Go to College...

Like everybody else, I have adored Liv Ullmann in Persona and Hour of the Wolf. Not even Pope Joan, which generally manages to make her look like George Peppard's twin brother, can suppress her grave appeal -- but I think she is being used to provide some Ingmar Bergman eroticism to balance the film's intermittent tone of Hollywood piety.

Time Out magazine called the film a "rough and often painfully clumsy costume epic with the usual love story underneath it all, and chauvinistic presumptions abounding. Against all odds, Ullmann gives a remarkable performance, and it could have been a gem of a subject had it been handled by a woman director."

== See also ==
- Pope Joan (2009 film)
- List of historical drama films
