= Pope Joan =

Legendary medieval woman pope

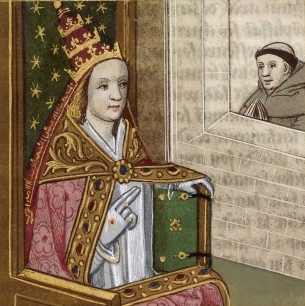
Illustrated manuscript depicting Pope Joan with the papal tiara. Bibliothèque nationale de France, c. 1560.

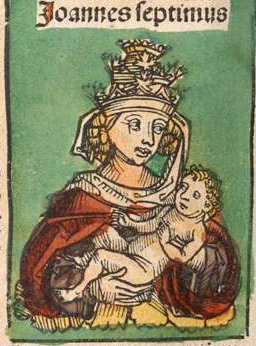
Depiction of "Pope John VII" in Hartmann Schedel's religious Nuremberg Chronicle, published in 1493

Pope Joan (Latin: Ioannes Anglicus; 855–857) was a woman who purportedly reigned as popess (female pope) for two years during the Middle Ages. Her story first appeared in chronicles in the 13th century and subsequently spread throughout Europe. The story was widely believed for centuries, but most modern scholars regard it as fictional.

Most versions of her story describe her as a talented and learned woman who disguised herself as a man, often at the behest of a lover. In the most common accounts, owing to her abilities she rose through the church hierarchy and was eventually elected pope. Her sex was revealed when she gave birth during a procession and she died shortly after, either through murder or natural causes. The accounts state that later church processions avoided this spot and that the Vatican removed the female pope from its official lists and crafted a ritual to ensure that future popes were male.

Pope Joan's existence was generally accepted as true until the 16th century, when several religious groups called the story into question. Until then, Joan was used as an exemplum in Dominican preaching and figured in books published in the Papal States. The Siena Cathedral, finished in 1263, featured a bust of Joan among other popes until 1600, when her depiction was repurposed into that of a male pope.

Jean de Mailly's chronicle, written around 1250, contains the first known mention of an unnamed female pope and inspired several more accounts over the next several years. The most popular and influential version is that interpolated into Martin of Opava's Chronicon Pontificum et Imperatorum later in the 13th century. Martin introduced details that the female pope's birth name was John Anglicus of Mainz, that she reigned in the 9th century and that she entered the church to follow her lover. The existence of Pope Joan was used in the defence of Walter Brut in his trial of 1391. Her existence was generally accepted as true until the 16th century, when a widespread debate among Catholic and Protestant writers called the story into question: various writers noted the implausibly long gap between Joan's supposed lifetime and her first appearance in texts. Protestant scholar David Blondel ultimately demonstrated the impossibility of the story in his 1647 treatise on the issue. Pope Joan is now widely considered fictional, though the legend remains influential in cultural depictions.

== Early mentions ==
The earliest mention of a female pope appears in the Dominican Jean de Mailly's chronicle of Metz, Chronica Universalis Mettensis, written in the early 13th century. In his telling the female pope is not named and the events are set in 1099. According to Jean:

Concerning a certain Pope or rather female Pope, who is not set down in the list of popes or Bishops of Rome, because she was a woman who disguised herself as a man and became, by her character and talents, a curial secretary, then a Cardinal and finally Pope. One day, while mounting a horse, she gave birth to a child. Immediately, by Roman justice she was bound by the feet to a horse's tail and dragged and stoned by the people for half a league, and, where she died, there she was buried, and at the place is written: "Petre, Pater Patrum, Papisse Prodito Partum" [Oh Peter, Father of Fathers, Betray the childbearing of the woman Pope]. At the same time, the four-day fast called the "fast of the female Pope" was first established.

— Jean de Mailly, Chronica Universalis Mettensis

Jean de Mailly's story was picked up by his fellow Dominican Stephen of Bourbon, who adapted it for his work on the Seven Gifts of the Holy Ghost. However the legend gained its greatest prominence when it appeared in the third recension (edited revision) of Martin of Opava's Chronicon Pontificum et Imperatorum later in the 13th century. This version, which may have been by Martin himself, is the first to attach a name to the figure, indicating that she was known as John Anglicus or John of Mainz. It also changes the date from the 11th to the 9th century, indicating that Joan reigned between Leo IV and Benedict III in the 850s. According to the Chronicon:

John Anglicus, born at Mainz, was Pope for two years seven months and four days and died in Rome, after which there was a vacancy in the Papacy of one month. It is claimed that this John was a woman, who as a girl had been led to Athens dressed in the clothes of a man by a certain lover of hers. There she became proficient in a diversity of branches of knowledge, until she had no equal, and, afterward in Rome, she taught the liberal arts and had great masters among her students and audience. A high opinion of her life and learning arose in the city; and she was chosen for Pope. While Pope, however, she became pregnant by her companion. Through ignorance of the exact time when the birth was expected, she was delivered of a child while in procession from St. Peter's to the Lateran, in a lane once named Via Sacra (the sacred way) but now known as the "shunned street" between the Colosseum and St Clement's church. After her death, it is said she was buried in that same place. The Lord Pope always turns aside from the street, and it is believed by many that this is done because of abhorrence of the event. Nor is she placed on the list of the Holy Pontiffs, both because of her female sex and on account of the foulness of the matter.

— Martin of Opava, Chronicon Pontificum et Imperatorum

One version of the Chronicon gives an alternative fate for the female pope: she did not die immediately after her exposure but was confined and deposed, after which she did many years of penance. Her son from the affair eventually became Bishop of Ostia and ordered her entombment in his cathedral when she died.

Other references to the female pope are attributed to earlier writers, though none appears in manuscripts that predate the Chronica. The one most commonly cited is Anastasius Bibliothecarius (d. 886), a compiler of Liber Pontificalis, who was a contemporary of the female Pope by the Chronicon's dating. However the story is found in only one unreliable manuscript of Anastasius. This manuscript, in the Vatican Library, bears the relevant passage inserted as a footnote at the bottom of a page. It is out of sequence and in a different hand, one that dates from after the time of Martin of Opava. This 'witness' to the female pope is likely to be based on Martin's account and not a possible source for it. The same is true of Marianus Scotus's Chronicle of the Popes, a text written in the 11th century. Some of its manuscripts contain a brief mention of a female pope named Johanna (the earliest source to attach to her the female form of the name), but all these manuscripts are later than Martin's work. Earlier manuscripts do not contain the legend.

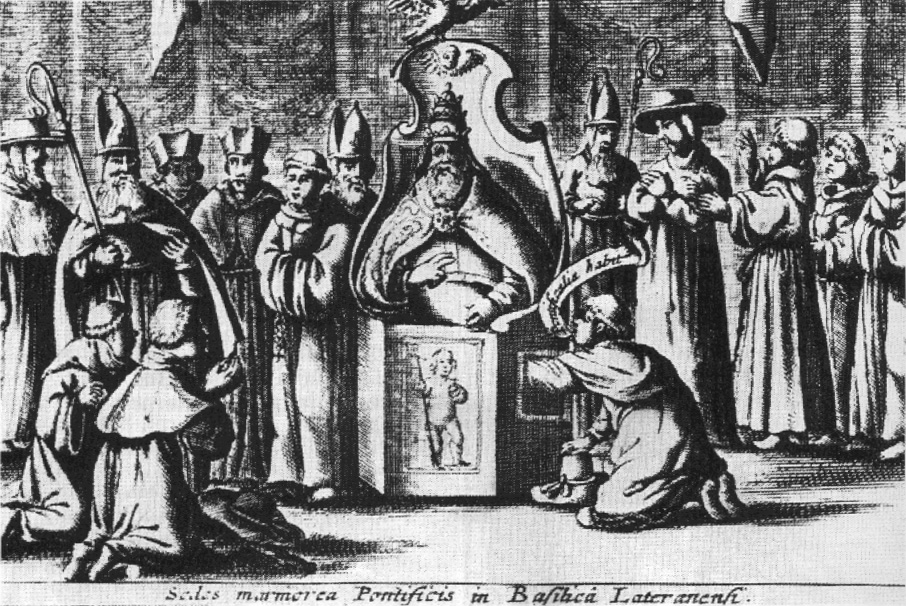
Illustration of Pope Innocent X having his testicles examined, from Roma Triumphans (1645)

Some versions of the legend suggest that subsequent popes were subjected to an examination whereby, having sat on a so-called sedia stercoraria or 'dung chair' containing a hole, a cardinal had to reach up and establish that the new pope had testicles before announcing "Duos habet et bene pendentes" ("He has two and they dangle nicely"), or "habet" ("he has them") for short.

There were associated legends as well. In the 1290s, the Dominican Robert of Uzès recounted a vision in which he saw the seat "where, it is said, the pope is proved to be a man". Pope Joan has been associated with marvelous happenings. Petrarch (1304–1374) wrote in his Chronica de le Vite de Pontefici et Imperadori Romani that after Pope Joan had been revealed as a woman:

[I]n Brescia it rained blood for three days and nights. In France there appeared marvelous locusts, which had six wings and very powerful teeth. They flew miraculously through the air, and all drowned in the British Sea. The golden bodies were rejected by the waves of the sea and corrupted the air, so that a great many people died.

— Petrarch, Chronica de le Vite de Pontefici et Imperadori Romani

However the attribution of this work to Petrarch may be incorrect.

== Later development ==
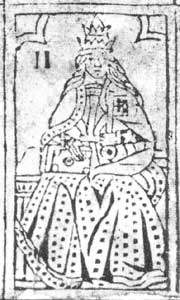
An untitled popess on the Rosenwald Sheet of uncut Tarot woodcuts. Early 16th-century. Now in National Gallery in Washington, D.C.

From the mid-13th century onward the story of the female pope was widely disseminated and believed. Joan was used as an exemplum in Dominican preaching. Bartolomeo Platina, the scholar who was prefect of the Vatican Library, wrote his Vitæ Pontificum Platinæ historici liber de vita Christi ac omnium pontificum qui hactenus ducenti fuere et XX in 1479 at the behest of his patron, Pope Sixtus IV. The book contains the following account of the female Pope:

Pope John VIII: John, of English extraction, was born at Mentz (Mainz) and is said to have arrived at popedom by evil art; for disguising herself like a man, whereas she was a woman, she went when young with her paramour, a learned man, to Athens, and made such progress in learning under the professors there that, coming to Rome, she met with few that could equal, much less go beyond her, even in the knowledge of the scriptures; and by her learned and ingenious readings and disputations, she acquired so great respect and authority that upon the death of Pope Leo IV (as Martin says) by common consent she was chosen pope in his room. As she was going to the Lateran Church between the Colossean Theatre (so called from Nero's Colossus) and St. Clement's her travail came upon her, and she died upon the place, having sat two years, one month, and four days, and was buried there without any pomp. This story is vulgarly told, but by very uncertain and obscure authors, and therefore I have related it barely and in short, lest I should seem obstinate and pertinacious if I had admitted what is so generally talked. I had better mistake with the rest of the world, though it be certain, that what I have related may be thought not altogether incredible.

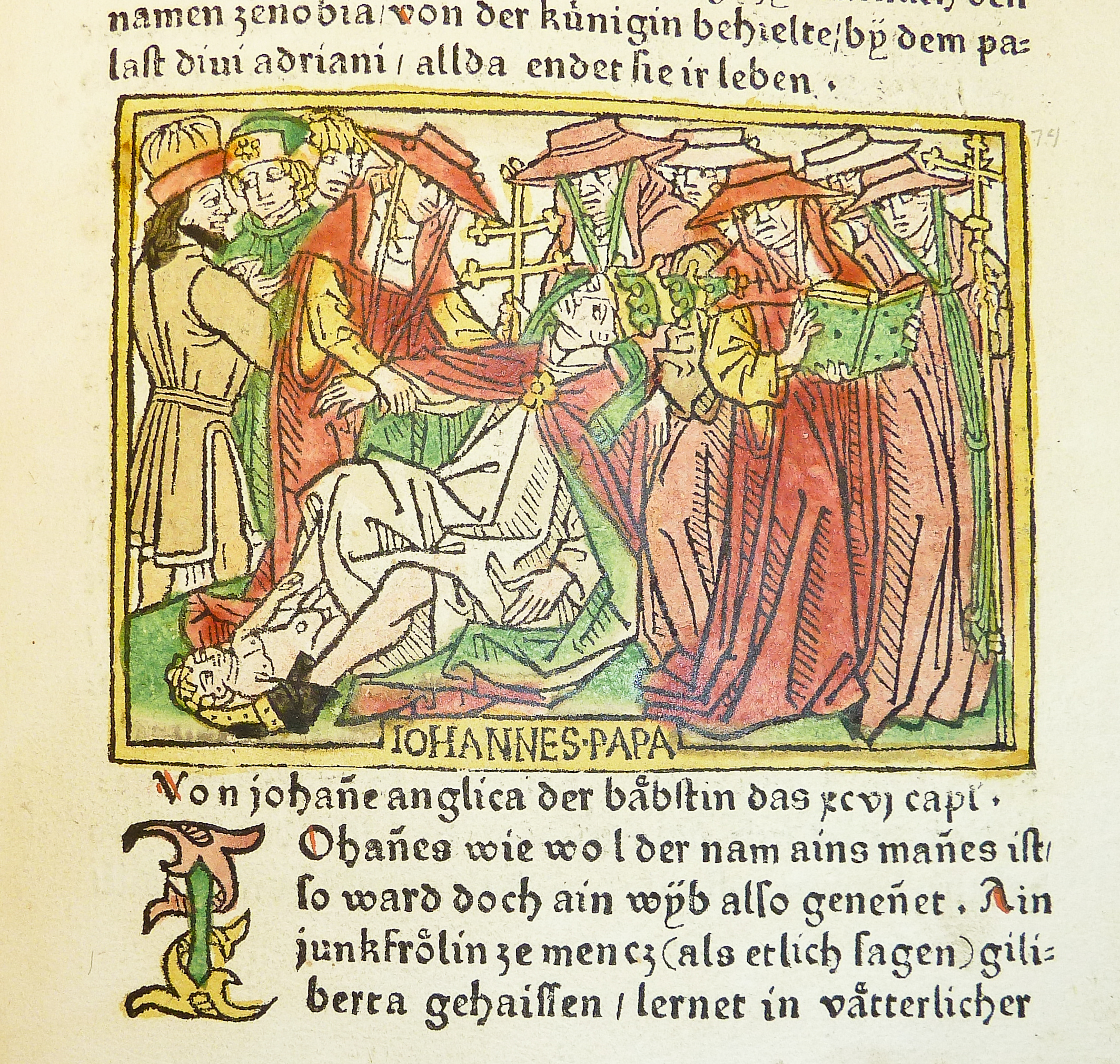
Pope Joan giving birth. Woodcut from a German translation by Heinrich Steinhöwel of Giovanni Boccaccio's De mulieribus claris, printed by Johannes Zainer at Ulm ca. 1474 (British Museum)

References to the female Pope abound in the later Middle Ages and Renaissance. Jans der Enikel (1270s) was the first to tell the story in German. Giovanni Boccaccio wrote about her in De Mulieribus Claris (1353). The Chronicon of Adam of Usk (1404) gives her a name, Agnes, and furthermore mentions a statue in Rome that is said to be of her. This statue had never been mentioned by any earlier writer anywhere; presumably it was an actual statue that came to be taken to be of the female pope. A late-14th-century edition of the Mirabilia Urbis Romae, a guidebook for pilgrims to Rome, tells readers that the female Pope's remains are buried at St. Peter's. It was around this time that a long series of busts of past Popes was made for the Duomo of Siena, which included one of the female pope, named as "Johannes VIII, Foemina de Anglia" and included between Leo IV and Benedict III.

At his trial in 1415 Jan Hus argued that the Church did not necessarily need a pope because, during the pontificate of "Pope Agnes" (as he also called her), it got on quite well. Hus's opponents at the trial insisted that his argument proved no such thing about the independence of the Church but they did not dispute that there had been a female pope at all.

== During the Reformation ==
In 1587 Florimond de Raemond, a magistrate in the parlement de Bordeaux and an antiquary, published his first attempt to deconstruct the legend, Erreur Populaire de la Papesse Jeanne (also subsequently published under the title L'Anti-Papesse). The tract applied humanist techniques of textual criticism to the Pope Joan legend, with the broader intent of supplying sound historical principles to ecclesiastical history, and the legend began to come apart, detail by detail. Raemond's Erreur Populaire went through successive editions, reaching a fifteenth as late as 1691.

In 1601, Pope Clement VIII declared the legend of the female pope to be untrue. The famous bust of her, inscribed Johannes VIII, Femina ex Anglia, which had been carved for the series of papal figures in the Duomo di Siena about 1400 and was noted by travelers, was either destroyed or recarved and relabeled, replaced by a male figure, that of Pope Zachary.

The legend of Pope Joan was "effectively demolished" by David Blondel, a mid-17th-century Protestant historian, who suggested that Pope Joan's tale may have originated in a satire against Pope John XI, who died in his early 20s. Blondel, through detailed analysis of the claims and suggested timings, argued that no such events could have happened.

The 16th-century Italian historian Onofrio Panvinio, commenting on one of Bartolomeo Platina's works that refer to Pope Joan, theorized that the story of Pope Joan may have originated from tales of Pope John XII; John reportedly had many mistresses, including one called Joan, who was very influential in Rome during his pontificate.

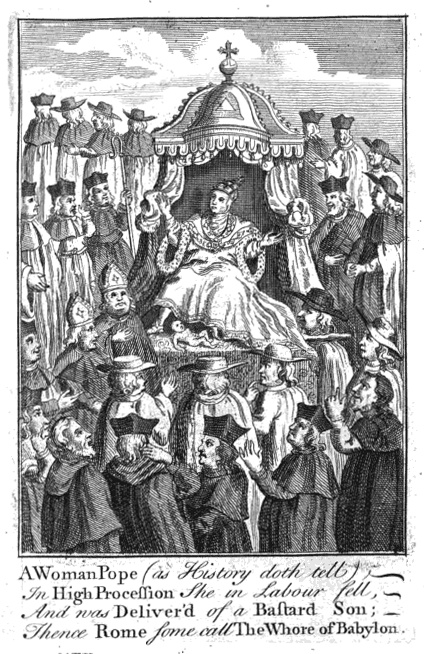
Engraving of Pope Joan giving birth, from A Present for a Papist (1675)

At the time of the Reformation, various Protestant writers took up the Pope Joan legend in their anti-Catholic writings, and the Catholics responded with their own polemic. According to Pierre Gustave Brunet,

Various authors, in the 16th and 17th centuries, occupied themselves with Pope Joan, but it was from the point of view of the polemic engaged in between the partisans of Lutheran or Calvinist reform and the apologists of Catholicism.

An English writer, Alexander Cooke, wrote a book entitled Pope Joane: A Dialogue between a Protestant and a Papist, which purported to prove the existence of Pope Joan by reference to Catholic traditions. It was republished in 1675 as A Present for a Papist: Or the Life and Death of Pope Joan, Plainly Proving Out of the Printed Copies, and Manscriptes of Popish Writers and Others, That a Woman called Joan, Was Really Pope of Rome, and Was There Deliver'd of a Bastard Son in the Open Street as She Went in Solemn Procession. The book gives an account of Pope Joan giving birth to a son in plain view of all those around, accompanied by a detailed engraving showing a rather surprised looking baby peeking out from under the Pope's robes. Even in the 19th century, authors such as Ewaldus Kist and Karl Hase discussed the story as a real occurrence. However, other Protestant writers, such as David Blondel and Gottfried Leibniz, rejected the story.

== Recent analysis and critique ==
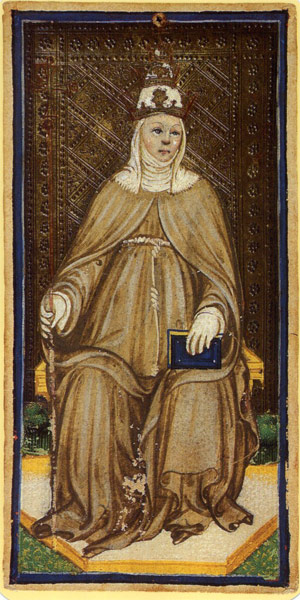
The Popess tarot card from the Visconti-Sforza tarot deck, c. 1450

Most scholars of the 20th and 21st centuries have dismissed Pope Joan as a medieval legend. British historian John Julius Norwich dismissed the myth after assessing evidence. In the Oxford Dictionary of Popes, J. N. D. Kelly declares the legend "Scarcely needs painstaking refutation today, for not only is there no contemporary evidence for a female Pope at any of the dates suggested for her reign, but the known facts of the respective periods make it impossible to fit one in." The appendix entry also cites chronological and material differences in the instances of the legend's telling, suggests an origin, and points to the Protestant historian David Blondel, who "effectively demolished it in treatises published at Amsterdam in 1647 and 1657."

The 1910 Catholic Encyclopedia elaborated on the historical timeline problem:

Between Leo IV and Benedict III, where Martinus Polonus places her, she cannot be inserted, because Leo IV died 17 July 855, and immediately after his death Benedict III was elected by the clergy and people of Rome; but, owing to the setting up of an Antipope, in the person of the deposed Cardinal Anastasius, he was not consecrated until 29 September. Coins exist which bear both the image of Benedict III and of Emperor Lothair, who died 28 September 855; therefore Benedict must have been recognized as pope before the last-mentioned date. On 7 October 855, Benedict III issued a charter for the Abbey of Corvey. Hincmar, Archbishop of Reims, informed Nicholas I that a messenger whom he had sent to Leo IV learned on his way of the death of this Pope, and therefore handed his petition to Benedict III, who decided it (Hincmar, ep. xl in P.L., CXXXVI, 85). All these witnesses prove the correctness of the dates given in the lives of Leo IV and Benedict III, and there was no interregnum between these two Popes, so that at this place there is no room for the alleged Popess.

It has also been noted that enemies of the papacy in the 9th century make no mention of a female Pope. For example, Photios I of Constantinople, who became Patriarch of Constantinople in 858 and was deposed by Pope Nicholas I in 863, had a contentious relationship with the Pope. He strongly defended his own authority as patriarch and opposed the influence of the Pope in Rome and would have likely highlighted any scandals of that time regarding the papacy; but he never mentions the story once in any of his voluminous writings. Indeed, at one point he mentions "Leo and Benedict, successively great priests of the Roman Church".

Rosemary and Darroll Pardoe, authors of The Female Pope: The Mystery of Pope Joan, theorize that if a female pope did exist, a more plausible time frame is 1086 and 1108, when there were several antipopes; during this time the reign of the legitimate popes Victor III, Urban II, and Paschal II was not always established in Rome, since the city was occupied by Henry IV, Holy Roman Emperor, and later sacked by the Normans. This also agrees with the earliest known version of the legend, by Jean de Mailly, as he places the story in the year 1099. De Mailly's account was acknowledged by his companion Stephen of Bourbon.

Peter Stanford, a British writer and former editor of The Catholic Herald, concluded in The Legend of Pope Joan: In Search of the Truth (2000) "Weighing all th[e] evidence, I am convinced that Pope Joan was an historical figure, though perhaps not all the details about her that have been passed on down the centuries are true". Stanford's work has been criticised as "credulous" by one mainstream historian, Vincent DiMarco. Against the lack of historical evidence to her existence, the question remains as to why the Pope Joan story has been popular and widely believed. Philip Jenkins in The New Anti-Catholicism: The Last Acceptable Prejudice suggests that the periodic revival of what he calls this "anti-papal legend" has more to do with feminist and anti-Catholic wishful thinking than historical accuracy.

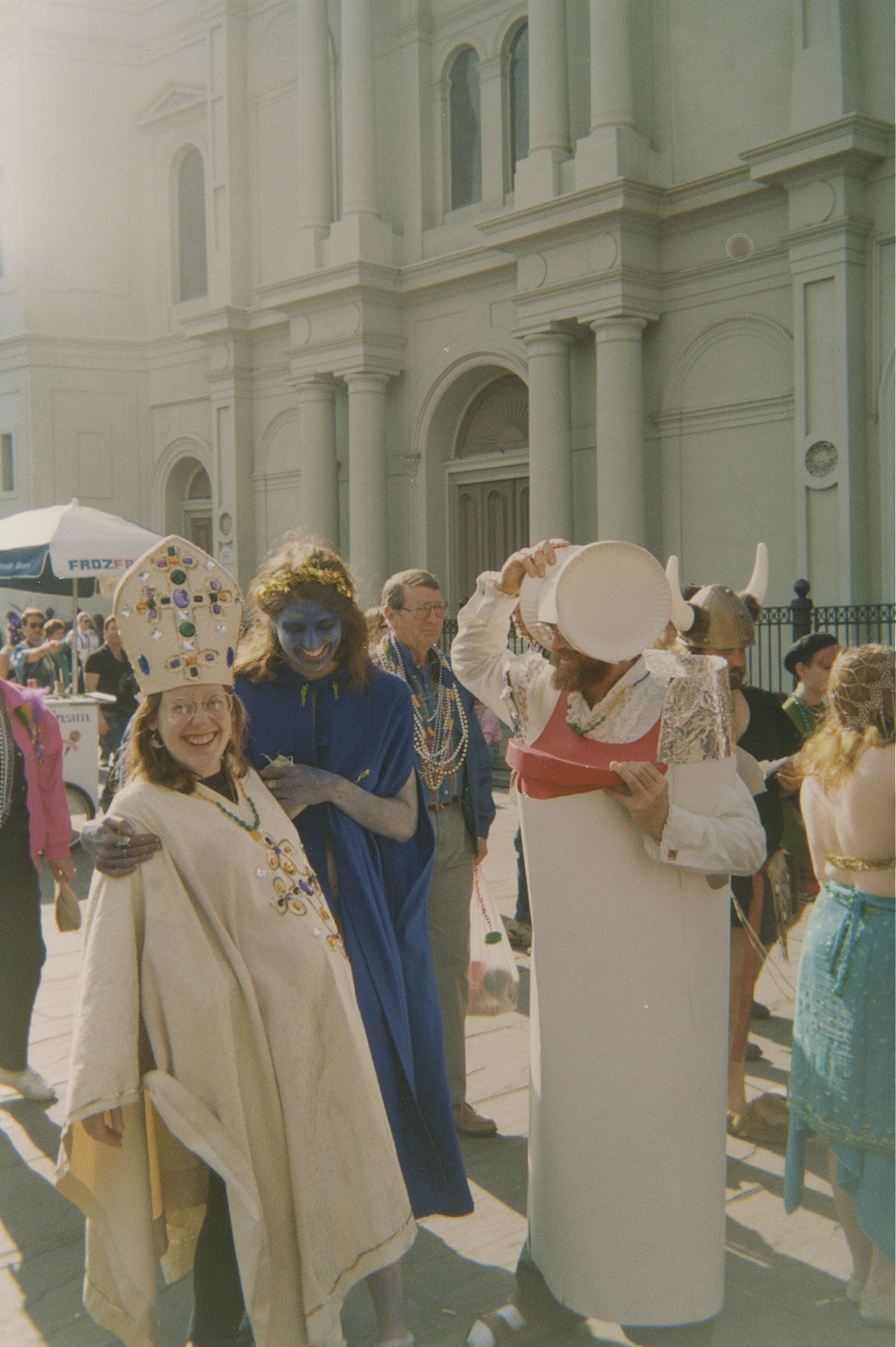
New Orleans: Mardi Gras revelers in Jackson Square, the French Quarter. A pregnant woman costumes as "Pope Joan."

The sedes stercoraria, the throne with a hole in the seat, now at St. John Lateran (the formal residence of the popes and center of Catholicism), is to be considered. This and other toilet-like chairs were used in the consecration of Pope Pascal II in 1099. In fact, one is still in the Vatican Museums, another at the Musée du Louvre. The reason for the configuration of the chair is disputed. It has been speculated that they originally were Roman bidets or imperial birthing stools, which because of their age and imperial links were used in ceremonies by Popes intent on highlighting their own imperial claims (as they did also with their Latin title, Pontifex Maximus).

Alain Boureau quotes the humanist Jacopo d'Angelo de Scarparia, who visited Rome in 1406 for the enthronement of Gregory XII. The pope sat briefly on two "pierced chairs" at the Lateran: "the vulgar tell the insane fable that he is touched to verify that he is indeed a man", a sign that this corollary of the Pope Joan legend was still current in the Roman street.

Medieval popes, from the 13th century onward, did indeed avoid the direct route between the Lateran and St Peter's, as Martin of Opava claimed. However, there is no evidence that this practice dated back any earlier. The origin of the practice is uncertain, but it is quite likely that it was maintained because of widespread belief in the Joan legend, and it was thought genuinely to date back to that period.

Although some medieval writers referred to the female pope as "John VIII", a genuine Pope John VIII reigned between 872 and 882. Due to the scarcity of records in the Early Middle Ages, confusion often reigns in the evaluation of events. The Pope Joan legend is also conflated with the gap in the numbering of the Johns. In the 11th century, Pope John XIV was mistakenly counted as two popes. When Petrus Hispanus was elected pope in 1276, he believed that there had already been twenty popes named John, so he skipped the number XX and numbered himself John XXI.

In 2018, Michael E. Habicht, an archaeologist at Flinders University, published new evidence in support of an historical Pope Joan. Habicht and grapho-analyst Marguerite Spycher analyzed papal monograms on medieval coins and found that there were two significantly different monograms attributed to Pope John VIII. Habicht argues that the earlier monogram, which he dates from 856 to 858, belongs to Pope Joan, while the latter monogram, which he dates to after 875, belongs to Pope John VIII. Habicht argues that Joan's brief reign occurred between that of Benedict III and Nicholas I. However, other historians have been critical of Habicht's conclusions. Bry Jensen "describes the findings as “intriguing” but remains unconvinced of Joan’s existence. At the height of the myth’s popularity, fabricated relics were prized commodities, raising the possibility that a devious craftsmith coined fake deniers referencing the legendary female pope. Although Habicht debunks the possibility of forgery, noting that contemporary demand for medieval coins is not strong enough to warrant such deception, Jensen argues this explanation fails to account for medieval forgeries." Thomas Noble, the Andrew V. Tackes professor emeritus at the University of Notre Dame, also argues that Habicht "misdates the sequence of ninth-century popes. There is absolutely no doubt or confusion that Sergius II reigned 844 to 847, Leo IV 847 to 855 and Benedict III 855 to 858", and thus "[t]here is no room for Joan, although [some traditions] tried to put her in the Benedict slot." Additionally, the "coins Habicht examines for his book, Noble said, are hardly evidence of a papal cover-up. "That coin is John VIII," which Habicht would have known if he had looked up the definitive literature, he noted. The "coins prove nothing…[and] Habicht's tortured reasoning does not hold up.""

== In fiction ==
Pope Joan has remained a popular subject for fictional works across artistic forms.

Plays featuring or referencing her include Ludwig Achim von Arnim's Päpstin Johanna (1813), a fragment by Bertolt Brecht (in Werke Bd 10), a monodrama, Pausin Johanna, by Cees van der Pluijm (1996), and Caryl Churchill's 1982 play, Top Girls, which featured Pope Joan as a character. In July 2019 a theatrical show, Pope Joan, was held in Malta at Mdina ditch featuring her as the main character.

She has also appeared widely in novels.

The Greek author Emmanuel Rhoides' 1866 novel, The Papess Joanne, was admired by Mark Twain and Alfred Jarry and freely translated by Lawrence Durrell as The Curious History of Pope Joan (1954). The legend also inspired Jarry's final written work before his death, The Pope's Mustard-Maker (1907), an operetta about a female pope known as Jane of Eggs, who operates under the papal name John VIII.

The American Donna Woolfolk Cross's 1996 historical romance, Pope Joan, was later produced as a German musical and a 2009 film. Other novels include Wilhelm Smets' Das Mährchen von der Päpstin Johanna auf’s Neue erörtert (1829), Marjorie Bowen's Black Magic (1909), Ludwig Gorm's Päpstin Johanna (1912), Yves Bichet's La Papesse Jeanne (2005) and Hugo N. Gerstl's Scribe: The Story of the Only Female Pope (2005). Howard Pyle's The Merry Adventures of Robin Hood contains a reference. In the 2016 novel by Robert Harris, Conclave (later filmed), a liberal candidate to the Papacy states that his regnal name would be "John", foreshadowing a twist with parallels to the legend of Pope Joan. Emily Maguire’s 2024 historical fiction novel, Rapture, is a retelling of the legend of Pope Joan. Alexander Pushkin left a plan of a play, written in French and entitled "La Papesse Jeanne", which was never finished

There have been two films based on the story of Pope Joan. In 1972, Michael Anderson directed Pope Joan (1972; released as The Devil's Imposter in the US; re-released in 2009 as She ... Who Would Be Pope). And in 2009, Cross's novel was filmed as Pope Joan.

Additionally, Pope Joan has featured in video games. She appears as a Ruler class Servant in the 2015 mobile game Fate/Grand Order, and is the inspiration for Johanna, one of Makoto Niijima's titular personas (manifestations of the soul used by humans to battle demons), in the 2016 video game Persona 5.

Andrea Balzola wrote "La Papessa", a piece of theatre performed extensively in Italy by Beatrice Schiaffino, including Milan Fringe Festival in October 2025. An English language version "The High Priestess - Johanna" was presented at Prague Fringe Festival in May 2026.

== See also ==
- Legends surrounding the papacy
- Marozia
- Saeculum obscurum
- Theodora (senatrix)
- The High Priestess
