= Donna Woolfolk Cross =

American writer

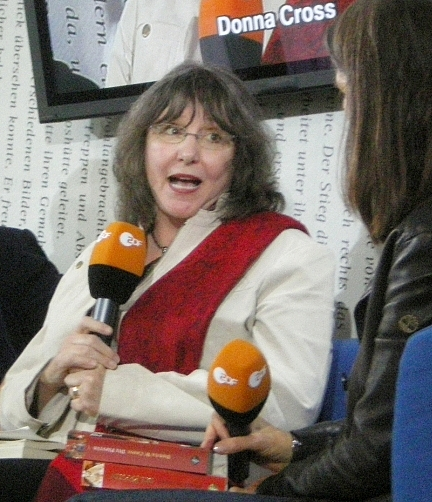
Donna Woolfolk Cross in 2009

Donna Woolfolk Cross (born 1947) is an American writer and the author of the novel Pope Joan, about a female Catholic Pope from 853 to 855. She is the daughter of Dorothy Woolfolk, a pioneering woman in the American comic book industry, and of novelist William Woolfolk.

== Biography ==
Donna Woolfolk Cross received her bachelor's degree in English from the University of Pennsylvania in 1969, graduating Phi Beta Kappa. She worked as an editorial assistant for the London, England, publishing company W.H. Allen and Company, then returned to the U.S. to work for the New York City advertising agency Young & Rubicam. She returned to college to earn a master's degree in Literature and Writing from UCLA. She later became a full-time author, and has published four non-fiction books and one novel.

== Bibliography ==
=== Non-fiction ===
- Word Abuse: How the Words We Use Use Us (1979) ISBN 978-0-698-10906-3
- Daddy's Little Girl: The Unspoken Bargain Between Fathers and Their Daughters (1983) (with William Woolfolk) ISBN 978-0-13-196279-8
- Mediaspeak: How Television Makes Up Your Mind (1984) ISBN 978-0-451-62802-2
- Speaking of Words: A Language Reader (1986) (with James MacKillop) ISBN 978-0-03-003953-9

=== Novels ===
- Pope Joan (1996) ISBN 978-0-345-41626-1
