= Pope Joan (novel) =

1996 novel by Donna Woolfolk Cross

- Author: Donna Woolfolk Cross
- Language: English
- Genre: Historical fiction
- Publisher: Random House
- Publication date: 1996
- Publication place: United States
- Pages: 422 (first edition)
- ISBN: 9780345416261

Pope Joan is a 1996 novel by American writer Donna Woolfolk Cross. It is based on the medieval legend of Pope Joan. For the most part this novel is the story of a young woman, whose desire to gain more knowledge compels her to dress up as a man, who (due to events beyond her control) eventually rises to become the pope. The novel has been adapted into a film, Pope Joan, released in 2009.

== Plot ==
Joan, the daughter of a priest and his Saxon wife, is born in 814 as the last of three children. When he discovers that Joan has learned to read, her father calls her “child of the devil” and blames the illness and death of his oldest son, Matthew, on her as a punishment. When the middle child, John, is sent away to school, Joan goes with him and is reluctantly accepted as well due to her brilliance. As she cannot live with the other male students, she is sent to live with a knight, Gerold, and his family while she attends the school.

Joan and Gerold soon fall in love. Although he remains faithful to his wife, she resents Joan and seizes an opportunity to force her into marriage at age 14. However, the ceremony is interrupted by Viking invaders. Joan narrowly escapes the attack, but her brother John is killed. She then decides to dress as a young man and joins the monastery at Fulda in her brother's place.

There she becomes a skilled physician and is ordained as a priest. Her father visits her in Fulda, believing her to be John. When he discovers who she is, he dies of a stroke before he can expose her. When the plague comes to Fulda, Joan sickens. Afraid that they will discover that she is a woman, she flees and finds refuge with a family she once helped.

After her convalescence she goes to Rome, where she becomes the personal physician to the Pope, Sergius, a weak man easily led by his venal brother Benedict. Joan attempts to guide Sergius so that the papacy becomes a force for good. Benedict resents her influence and attempts to frame her for breaking her vow of chastity. When the Frankish Emperor Lothar marches on Rome, Benedict flees with funds intended to try to placate him, and Joan is restored to her former place of authority. Benedict is apprehended by Gerold, now serving Lothar, and executed on Sergius' orders.

Meanwhile, Gerold accidentally meets and recognizes Joan. He keeps her secret, but declares he loves her. Eventually they consummate their relationship and Joan becomes pregnant.

Lothar and Anastasius charge Gerold, now commander of the Pope's militia, with corruption. Joan's quick thinking saves Gerold and they realise they must flee the city before her condition becomes obvious. Joan delays, insisting on staying until Easter as the people need her. Anastasius plans to seize the throne and realises he needs to remove Gerold before he can attack Joan directly. During a papal procession, Gerold is lured into a trap, stabbed from behind and killed. Already in pain, Joan runs to be with him but then miscarries in public and dies from blood loss.

An epilogue reveals that Anastasius indeed took the papacy but could not hold it. He gained revenge of a sort by obliterating Joan from history, excluding her from his book on the lives of the Popes. However, an archbishop secretly makes restitution by restoring Joan's papacy in a copy of the book he makes himself—for the archbishop is also secretly a woman, the daughter of the peasant family saved by Joan many years earlier.
