= 56th Berlin International Film Festival =

2006 film festival in Berlin, Germany

- Festival poster
- Opening film: Snow Cake
- Closing film: Pat Garrett and Billy the Kid
- Location: Berlin, Germany
- Founded: 1951
- Awards: Golden Bear: Grbavica
- No. of films: 360 films
- Festival date: 9–19 February 2006
- Website: Website

Berlin International Film Festival chronology
- 57th 55th

The 56th Berlin International Film Festival was held from 9 to 19 February 2006. The festival opened with Snow Cake by Marc Evans. Digitally restored version of Sam Peckinpah's 1973 film Pat Garrett and Billy the Kid served as the closing film. British actress Charlotte Rampling was selected as the head of the jury.

The Golden Bear was awarded to Grbavica: The Land of My Dreams directed by Jasmila Žbanić.

The retrospective was dedicated to the film actresses of 1950s, titled Dream Girls. Film Stars in the 1950s was shown at the festival. More than 186,000 tickets were sold at the festival with visitors from 120 countries, including 3,800 journalists, attended the festival.

== Juries ==
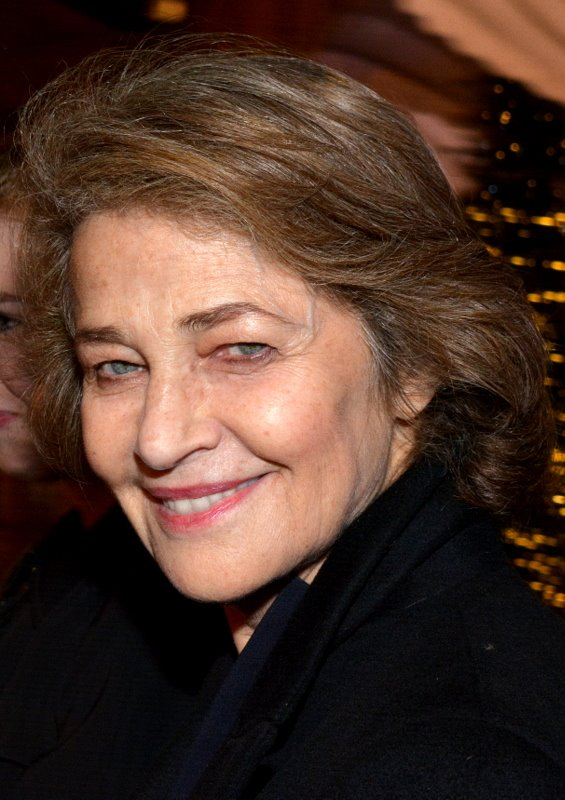
Charlotte Rampling, Jury President

The following people were announced as being on the jury for the festival:

=== Main Competition ===
- Charlotte Rampling, British actress - Jury President
- Matthew Barney, American director and artist
- Yash Chopra, Indian director and producer
- Marleen Gorris, Dutch filmmaker
- Janusz Kamiński, Polish director of photography
- Armin Mueller-Stahl, German actor
- Fred Roos, American producer
- Lee Young-ae, South Korean actress

=== Best First Feature Award ===
- Valentina Cervi, Italian actress
- Goran Paskaljević, Serbian director
- Hans Weingartner, Austrian director and producer

=== Short Films Competition ===
- Mariela Besuievsky, Spanish producer
- Florian Gallenberger, German director and screenwriter
- Jung-Wan Oh, South Korean producer

== Official Sections ==
=== Main Competition ===
The following films were selected for the main competition:

English title	Original title	Director(s)	Country
A Prairie Home Companion		Robert Altman	United States
Atomised	Elementarteilchen	Oskar Roehler	Germany
Candy		Neil Armfield	Australia
Comedy of Power	L'ivresse du pouvoir	Claude Chabrol	France, Germany
The Free Will	Der freie Wille	Matthias Glasner	Germany
Find Me Guilty		Sidney Lumet	United States
Grbavica		Jasmila Žbanić	Austria, Bosnia and Herzegovina, Germany
It's Winter	Zemestan	Rafi Pitts	Iran
Invisible Waves	คำพิพากษาของมหาสมุทร	Pen-Ek Ratanaruang	Netherlands, Thailand, Hong Kong
Isabella	伊莎貝拉	Pang Ho-cheung	Hong Kong, China
Longing	Sehnsucht	Valeska Grisebach	Germany
The Minder	El custodio	Rodrigo Moreno	Argentina, France, Germany
Offside	آفساید	Jafar Panahi	Iran
Requiem	Requiem	Hans-Christian Schmid	Germany
The Road to Guantanamo		Michael Winterbottom, Mat Whitecross	United Kingdom
Romanzo Criminale		Michele Placido	Italy, United Kingdom, France
A Soap	En Soap	Pernille Fischer Christensen	Denmark, Sweden
Slumming		Michael Glawogger	Austria, Switzerland
Snow Cake (opening film)		Marc Evans	United Kingdom, Canada

== Official Awards ==
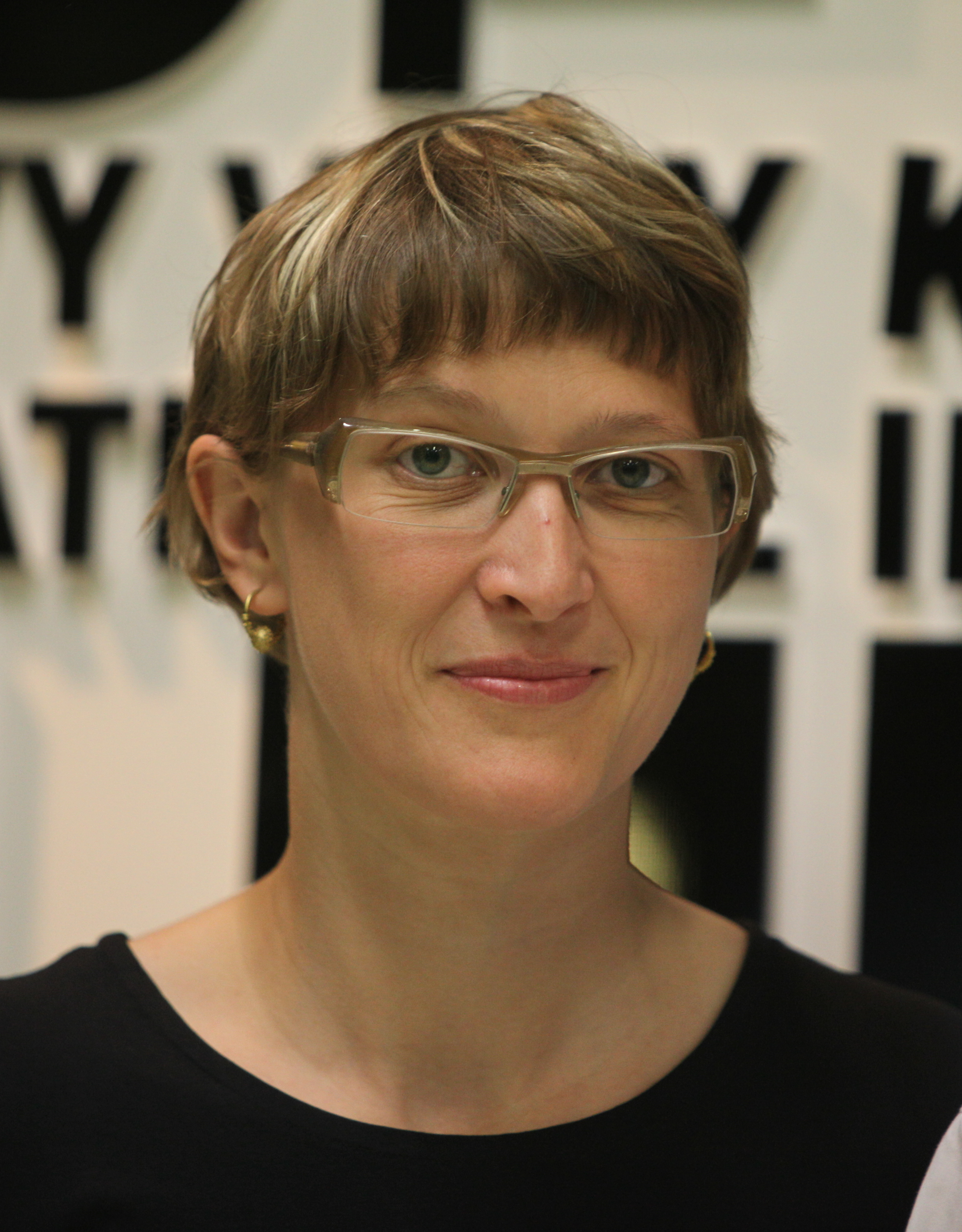
Jasmila Žbanić, winner of the Golden Bear at the festival

=== Main Competition ===
The following prizes were awarded by the Jury:

- Golden Bear: Grbavica: The Land of My Dreams by Jasmila Žbanić
- Silver Bear for Jury Grand Prix:
  - Offside by Jafar Panahi
  - En soap by Pernille Fischer Christensen
- Silver Bear for Best Actor: Moritz Bleibtreu for The Elementary Particles
- Silver Bear for Best Actress: Sandra Hüller for Requiem
- Silver Bear for Best Director: Michael Winterbottom & Mat Whitecross for The Road to Guantanamo
- Silver Bear for Outstanding Artistic Contribution: Jürgen Vogel for The Free Will
- Silver Bear for Best Film Music: Isabella by Peter Kam
- Alfred Bauer Prize: Rodrigo Moreno for The Minder

=== Honorary Golden Bear ===
- Andrzej Wajda
- Ian McKellen

=== Golden Bear for Best Short Film ===
- Never Like the First Time! by Jonas Odell
  - Honorable Mention: Maryam Keshavarz for El día que morí

=== Berlinale Camera ===
- Michael Ballhaus
- Jürgen Böttcher
- Laurence Kardish
- Peter B. Schumann
- Hans Helmut Prinzler

=== Best First Feature ===
- En soap by Pernille Fischer Christensen (director) & Lars Bredo Rahbek (producer)

== Independent Awards ==
=== Panorama Audience Award ===
- Tomer Heymann for Paper Dolls
- Short Film: Talya Lavie for The Substitute

=== Crystal Bear ===
- Best Short Film: Cameron B. Alyasin for Never an Absolution
  - Special Mention: Irina Boiko for The Thief
- Best Feature Film: Niels Arden Oplev for We Shall Overcome
  - Special Mention: Auraeus Solito for The Blossoming of Maximo Oliveros
- 14Plus Best Feature Film: Henry Meyer for Four Weeks in June
  - Special Mention: Claude Gagnon for Kamataki

=== Deutsches Kinderhilfswerk Grand Prix ===
- The Blossoming of Maximo Oliveros by Auraeus Solito
- Special Award: A Fish with a Smile by C. Jay Shih
- Special Mention:
  - Best Short Film: Vika by Tsivia Barkai
  - Best Feature Film: I Am by Dorota Kędzierzawska

=== Teddy ===
- Best Short Film: El día que morí by Maryam Keshavarz
- Best Documentary Film: Beyond Hatred by Olivier Meyrou
- Best Feature Film: The Blossoming of Maximo Oliveros by Auraeus Solito
- Jury Award: Patrick Carpentier for Combat

=== FIPRSECI Prize ===
- Competition: Requiem by Hans-Christian Schmid
- Forum of New Cinema: So Yong Kim for In Between Days
- Panorama: Knallhart by Detlev Buck

=== Prize of the Ecumenical Jury ===
- Competition: Grbavica by Jasmila Žbanić
- Forum of New Cinema: Conversations on a Sunday Afternoon by Khalo Matabane
- Panorama: The Collector by Feliks Falk

=== C.I.C.A.E. Award ===
- Forum of New Cinema: Close to Home by Dalia Hager
- Panorama: Zhang Yuan for Little Red Flowers

=== Netpac Award ===
- Dear Pyongyang by Yong-hi Yang

=== Prix UIP Berlin ===
- The Fence by Ricardo Íscar

=== Label Europa Cinemas ===
- Detlev Buck for Knallhart

=== Caligari Film Award ===
- Ben Hopkins for 37 Uses for a Dead Sheep

=== DIALOGUE en Perspective ===
- Bülent Akinci for Running on Empty
  - Special Mention: Florian Gaag for Wholetrain

=== Talent Movie of the Week ===
- Phillip Van for High Maintenance

=== Berlin Today Award ===
- Anna Azevedo for BerlinBall

=== Score Competition ===
- Alasdair Reid

=== Manfred Salzgeber Award ===
- Tomer Heymann for Paper Dolls

=== DAAD Short Film Award ===
- Rony Sasson for Swanettes

=== Peace Film Award ===
- Jasmila Žbanić for Grbavica

=== Amnesty International Film Prize ===
- Masoud Arif Salih for Narcissus Blossom

=== Wolfgang Staudte Award ===
- Tizza Covi for Babooska

=== Prize of the Guild of German Art House Cinemas ===
- Matthias Glasner for The Free Will

=== Femina-Film-Prize ===
- Yasmin Khalifa for Bye Bye Berlusconi!

=== Reader Jury of the "Berliner Morgenpost" ===
- Robert Altman for A Prairie Home Companion

=== Reader Jury of the "Berliner Zeitung" ===
- Shion Sono for Strange Circus

=== Reader Jury of the "Siegessäule" ===
- Tomer Heymann for Paper Dolls
