= Thomas Heinze =

German actor (born 1964)

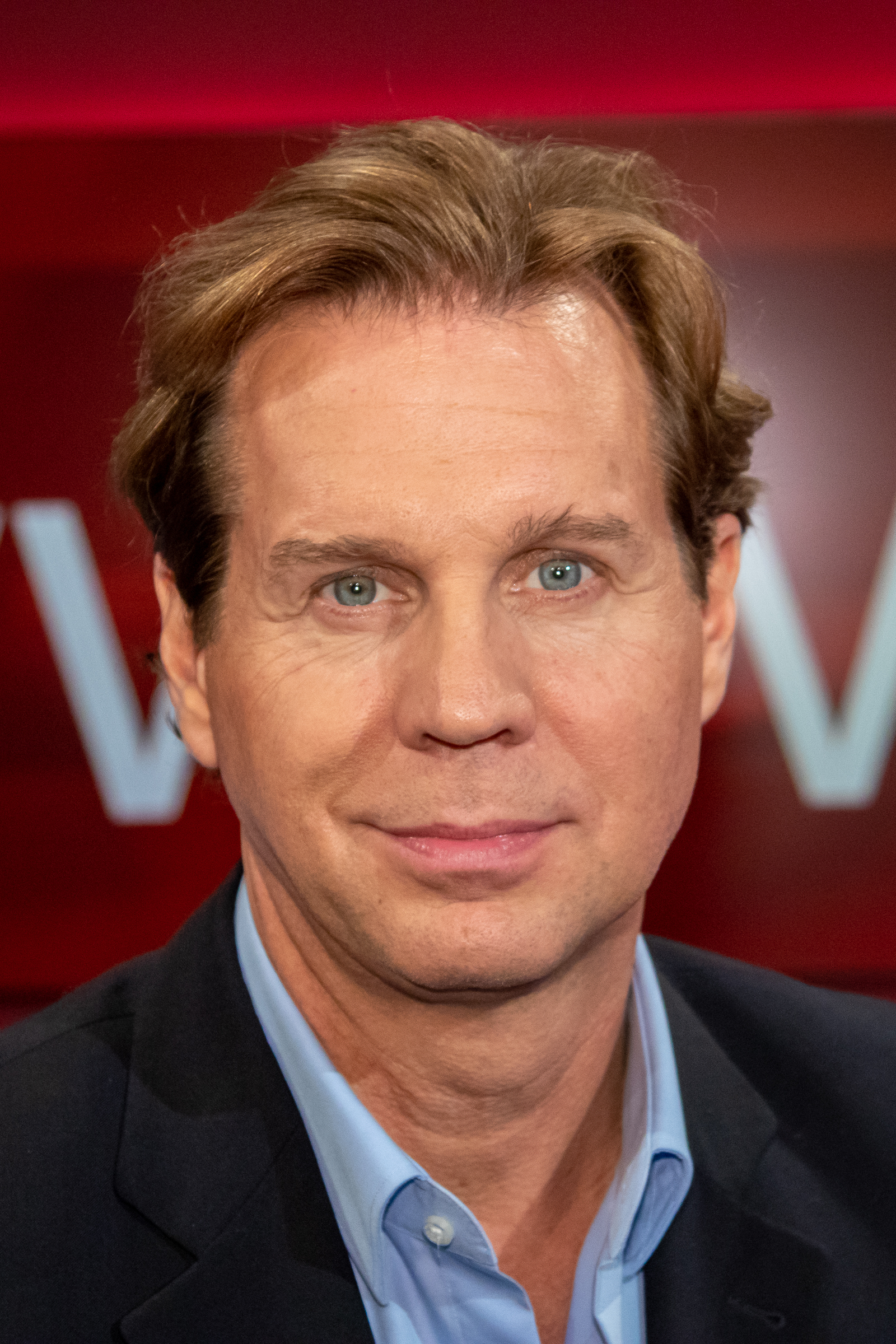
- Heinze in 2018
- Born: 30 March 1964 (age 62); West Berlin, West Germany
- Occupation: Actor
- Years active: 1988–present

Thomas Heinze (born 30 March 1964) is a German actor. He has appeared in more than one hundred films since 1988.

== Selected filmography ==
Film
Year	Title	Role	Director	Notes
1990	A Crazy Couple	Till	Sönke Wortmann	TV film
1991	Voyager	Kurt	Volker Schlöndorff	
1991	Alone Among Women	Tom Blattner	Sönke Wortmann	
1992	Silent Shadow	Willi	Sherry Hormann	
1992	The True Story About Men and Women	Wolf	Robert van Ackeren	
1993	Mr. Bluesman	Spike	Sönke Wortmann	
1993	Dann eben mit Gewalt	Alex	Rainer Kaufmann	TV film
1993	Justice	Felix Spät	Hans W. Geißendörfer	
1994	Women Are Simply Wonderful	Arthur	Sherry Hormann	
1995	Japaner sind die besseren Liebhaber	Peter Merz	Philipp Weinges	
1996	The Superwife	Will Gross	Sönke Wortmann	
1996	Sexy Sadie	Fake Brother	Matthias Glasner	
1996	Charley's Aunt	Stefan Lohmann	Sönke Wortmann	TV film
1998	Mrs. Rettich, Czerni and I	Bakunin	Markus Imboden	
1999	Death Run	Richard	Curt Faudon	TV film
1999	Latin Lover	Frank Glaser	Oskar Roehler	TV film
1999	The Devil and Ms. D	Robert Dulz	Bernd Eichinger	
2000	The Hustle	Martin	Stuart Cooper	TV film
2001	The Crusaders	Prince Roland	Dominique Othenin-Girard	TV miniseries
2003	Paradise Found	Schuff	Mario Andreacchio	
2003	A Light in Dark Places	Rudolf Schönfeld	Kaspar Heidelbach	TV film
2004	A2 Racer	Polizeihauptmeister Schmitt-Jahnke	Michael Keusch	
2004	Der Wixxer	Rather Short	Tobi Baumann	
2008	Time of the Comet	Prince Wilhelm zu Wied	Fatmir Koçi	
2009	Rabbit Without Ears 2	the beauty surgeon	Til Schweiger	
2013	Sources of Life	Martin Ellers	Oskar Roehler	
2013	Der Minister	Jan Breitmann	Uwe Janson	TV film

TV series
Year	Title	Role	Notes
2007	Der Fürst und das Mädchen	Thomas Baumgartner	11 episodes
Since 2008	Marie Brand	Dr. Gustav Engler	20 episodes
Since 2023	Der Alte	Kriminalhauptkommissar Caspar Bergmann	29+ episodes
TBA	Weiss & Morales	Markus	4 episodes
