= August Zirner =

American actor

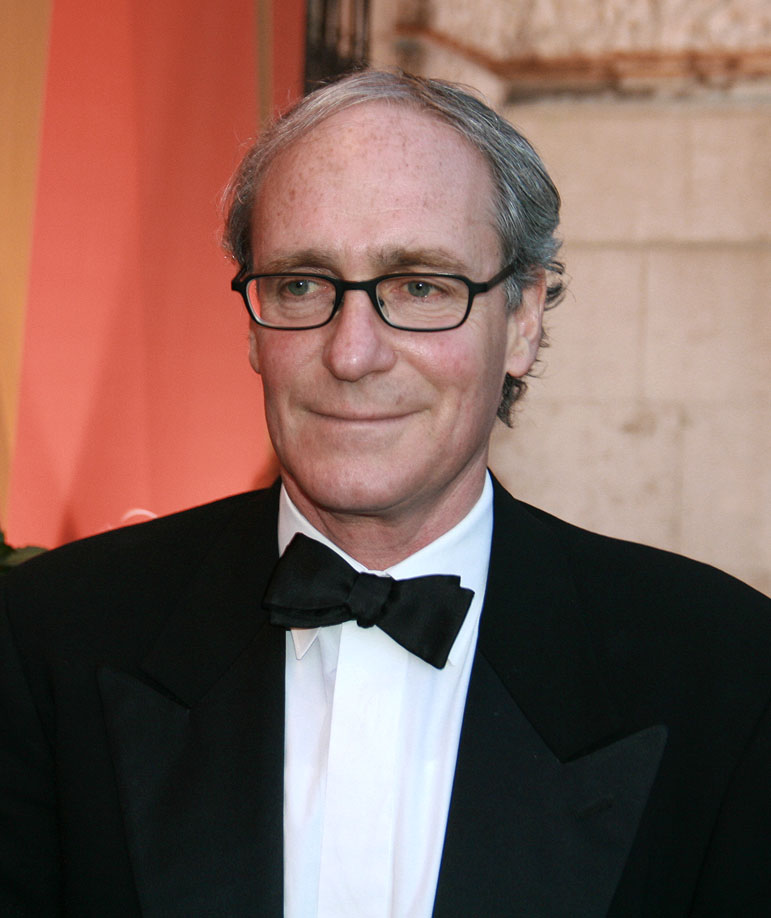
August Zirner at the Romy TV awards (Hofburg Imperial Palace in Vienna)

August Zirner (born 7 January 1956) is an American-Austrian actor, who starred in over 60 film productions. He is one of the most popular actors in Germany.

== Biography ==
Zirner was born as son of Austrian Jewish immigrants in the United States in Urbana, Illinois. His father had fled from the Nazis. In 1976 he studied drama at the Max Reinhardt Seminar in Vienna before he made his debut as an actor at the Volkstheater in Vienna. After that he was engaged in Hanover, Wiesbaden and at the Munich Kammerspiele. His breakthrough into film was in The Promise in 1994.

He has appeared in numerous films and television films, e. g. in Café Europa (1990) by Franz Xaver Bogner, Voyager (1991) by Volker Schlöndorff, Talk of the Town (1995) by Rainer Kaufmann, Winterkind (1997) by Margarethe von Trotta, The Pharmacist (1997) by Rainer Kaufmann and The Counterfeiters by Stefan Ruzowitzky, which was awarded with the Academy Award for Best Foreign Language Film in 2008. For the film Rage, he got the 2006 Grimme-Preis.

In 2009 Zirner played the transverse flute together with the Spardosen-Trio and the Theatre Program Diagnose: Jazz. In May 2011 Zirner acts in Blind Date, a play based on a film by Theo van Gogh at the Schauspielhaus Graz, a production of Bernadette Sonnenbichler.

Zirner is married to actress Katalin Zsigmondy and one of his four children is the actor Johannes Zirner. Although he has lived in Europe since 1973, August Zirner has retained his U.S. citizenship.

== Commitment ==
August Zirner supports the Austrian Service Abroad as an advisor for the Austrian Holocaust Memorial Service.

== Awards ==
2006 - "Special Recognition" by the German Academy of Performing Arts on the Film Festival Baden-Baden for the production team of Wut.

== Selected filmography ==
- 1984: Knock on the Wrong Door (directed by Gabriela Zerhau) .... Wolfgang
- 1986: Now or Never .... Paul
- 1988: Felix .... Luci's Husband
- 1989: Money .... Lothar Fuchs
- 1990: Café Europa .... Yobo
- 1991: No Mention of Violence (TV Movie, directed by Theodor Kotulla) .... Frank Götz
- 1991: Voyager .... Joachim Hencke
- 1991: Forever Young (TV Movie) .... Tomy
- 1994: Du bringst mich noch um (directed by Wolfram Paulus) .... Simon Halm
- 1995: The Promise .... Konrad
- 1995: Talk of the Town .... Erik Kirsch
- 1996: Hannah (directed by Reinhard Schwabenitzky) .... Wolfgang Heck
- 1997: Der rote Schakal (TV Movie) .... Werner Leiser
- 1997: Der Wald (TV Movie, based on a novel by Werner Kopacka) .... Karl Fürst
- 1997: The Pharmacist .... Pawel Siebert
- 1997: Winterkind (TV Movie, directed by Margarethe von Trotta) .... Michael
- 1998: Suzie Washington (directed by Florian Flicker) .... Herbert Korn
- 1999: Annaluise & Anton .... Richard Pogge
- 2000: Kissing My Sister .... Jan Lomberg
- 2001: Mostly Martha .... Martha's Therapist
- 2001: Taking Sides (directed by István Szabó) .... Captain Ed Martin
- 2001: Das Sams .... Herr Oberstein
- 2002: Amen. (directed by Costa-Gavras) .... Von Weizsäcker
- 2002: Joe and Max (TV Movie) .... David Lewin
- 2002: Gebürtig .... Danny Demant
- 2002: Trenck (TV Movie, directed by Gernot Roll) .... König Friedrich II.
- 2003: Novaks Ultimatum (TV Movie) .... Dr. Günther Erhardt
- 2004: Queen of Cherries (TV Mini-Series, directed by Rainer Kaufmann) .... Samuel Goldfisch
- 2004: Sergeant Pepper .... Dr. Theobald
- 2005: Speer und Er (TV Mini-Series) .... Dr. Gilbert
- 2005: Liebe nach dem Tod (TV Movie) .... Paul Markwart
- 2005: A Sound of Thunder .... Clay Derris
- 2005: Tara Road .... Greg Vine
- 2005: Der Todestunnel (TV Movie) .... Manfred Grabowski
- 2005: Mutig in die neuen Zeiten (TV Movie, directed by Harald Sicheritz) .... Paul Berkowitz
- 2006: Helen, Ted und Fred (TV Movie, directed by Sherry Hormann) .... Peter Kowalski
- 2006: Rage (TV Movie) .... Simon Laub
- 2007: The Counterfeiters .... Dr. Klinger
- 2007: Herr Bello .... Herr Sternheim / Traugott Sternheim
- 2007: Meine böse Freundin (TV Movie) .... Robert Mahrtaler
- 2007: Contergan (TV Movie) .... Dr. Gerd Naumann
- 2008: Come In and Burn Out .... Richard Harms
- 2008: Ein starker Abgang (TV Movie) .... Dr. Kübler
- 2009: Sleepless (TV Movie) .... Dr. Borchert
- 2009: Thanksgiving (TV Movie) .... Dr. Martin Langhammer
- 2009: Dr. Hope (TV Movie) .... Ludwig von Arnstetten
- 2009: Berlin 36 .... Edwin Bergmann
- 2009: Ein Dorf sieht Mord (TV Movie) .... Martin Selig
- 2009: Oh, What a Mess (TV Movie) .... Ludwig Norderstedt
- 2009: Meine Familie bringt mich um (TV Movie) .... Peter
- 2010: Klimawechsel (TV Series) .... Dr. Dieter Dumont
- 2010: The Last 30 Years (TV Movie) .... Oskar Landrock
- 2010: An Intern for Life (TV Movie) .... Ulf Kamprath
- 2011: Der Kardinal (TV Movie) .... Franz König
- 2012: Sams im Glück .... Herr Oberstein
- 2012: Milk Money (TV Movie) .... Dr. Martin Langhammer
- 2012: Homecoming (TV Movie) .... August Staudenmeyer
- 2012: The Dead and the Living .... Lenzi Weiss
- 2013: The Blind Spot .... Meier
- 2014: High Tide Is Dead on Time (TV Movie) .... Alexander Halbach
- 2014: Clara Immerwahr (TV Movie) .... Philipp Immerwahr
- 2014: Coming In .... Salvatore
- 2015: The Misplaced World .... Georg
- 2015: Master of Death (TV Movie) .... Andreas Niethammer
- 2015: Colonia Dignidad .... German Ambassador
- 2017: Euphoria .... Frank
- 2018: Wackersdorf .... Innenminister
- 2018: What Doesn't Kill Us .... Maximilian
- 2018: Shillings from Heaven .... Direktor Nationalbank
- 2018: Die Affäre Borgward (TV Movie) .... Wilhelm Nolting-Hauff
- 2019: Das Ende der Wahrheit .... Dr. Grünhagen
- 2022: The Silent Forest .... Gustav Dallmann
