= The Pharmacist =

The Pharmacist may refer to:

- The Pharmacist (1933 film), an American comedy starring W. C. Fields
- The Pharmacist (1997 film), a German comedy
- The Pharmacist (TV series), a 2020 American true crime docuseries
- The Pharmacist, a novel by Ingrid Noll, basis for the 1997 film
