= Axel Prahl =

German actor (born 1960)

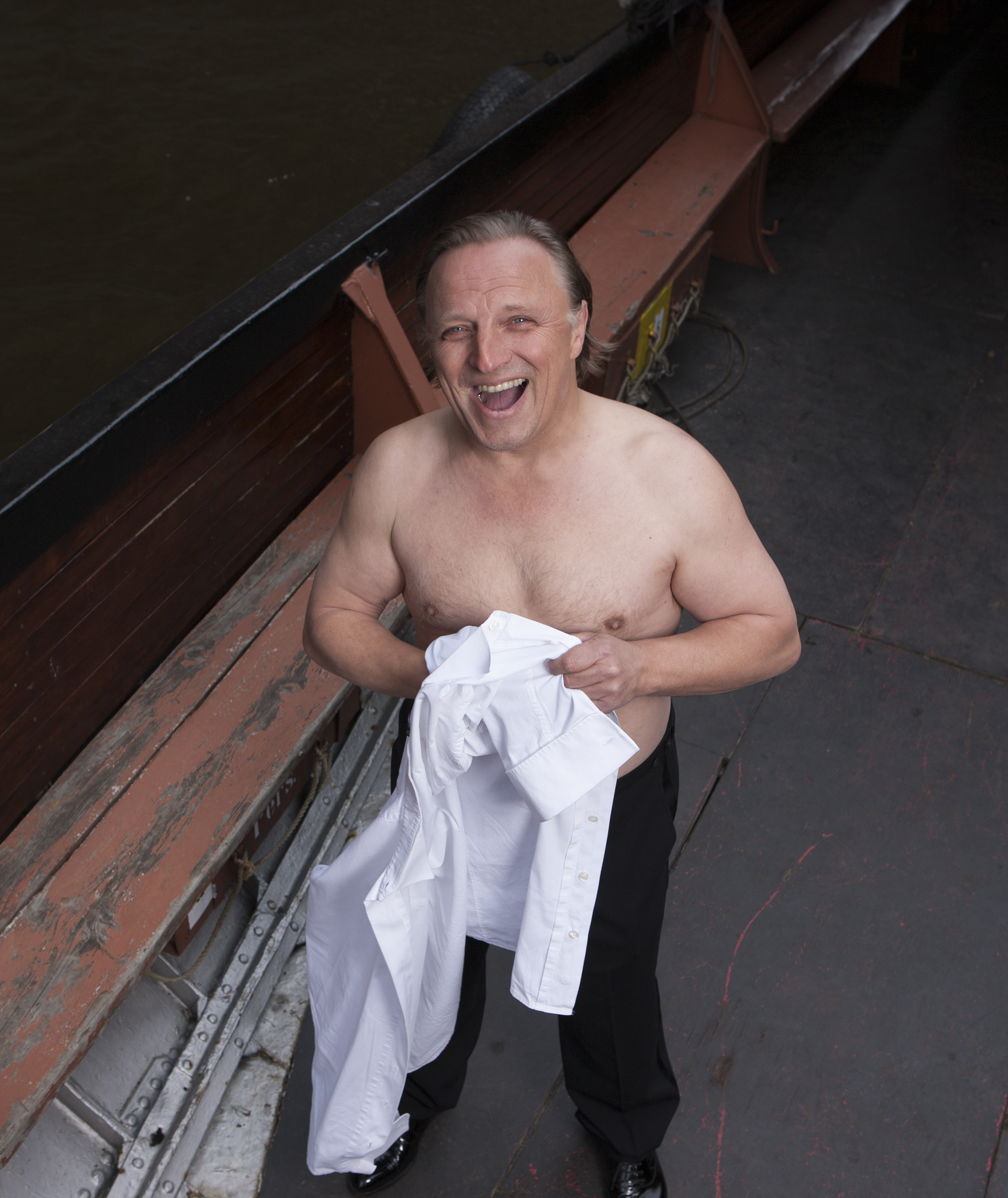
- Axel Prahl photographed by Oliver Mark, Berlin 2009
- Born: 26 March 1960 (age 66); Eutin, West Germany
- Occupations: Actor, musician
- Years active: 1992–present
- Website: axelprahl.de

Axel Prahl (born 26 March 1960) is a German actor, voice actor and musician.

== Biography ==
Prahl, born in Eutin, grew up in nearby Neustadt in Holstein. After his A-levels, he started studying music and mathematics, but then went on to acting school in Kiel. His acting debut came in 1994 in a television series for ZDF.

Aside from his film acting, for which he has won several accolades including two Adolf Grimme Awards, Prahl has starred in 23 episodes of the television crime series Tatort. He also co-starred in the 2009 TV film 12 Winter with Jürgen Vogel. The cine films Nightshapes (1999) and Grill Point (2002) marked the start of a continuous successful cooperation with director Andreas Dresen which harvested some renown awards. In 2006, Prahl won the German Film Critics Association Award as "Best Actor" for the Dresen film drama "Willenbrock".

Aside from acting, Prahl started as a sideline a music career, releasing three albums (2011, 2013 and 2018) as a singer-songwriter and bandleader. From 2007 on, Prahl hosted annually the two days summer music festival Inselleuchten at Marienwerder, Brandenburg. He speaks English and Spanish quite fluently.

Prahl is married and lives with his third wife in Berlin, and he has got four grown-up children, one of them an actress.
