= Jürgen Vogel =

German actor (born 1968)

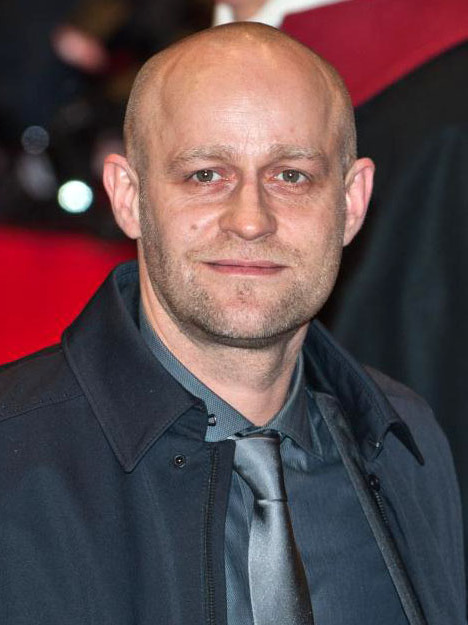
- Vogel in 2012
- Born: Jürgen Peter Vogel; 29 April 1968 (age 58); Hamburg, West Germany
- Occupations: Actor, producer
- Years active: 1992–present
- Spouse: Natalia Belitski
- Children: 6

Jürgen Peter Vogel (German pronunciation: [ˈjʏʁɡn̩ ˈpeːtɐ ˈfoːɡl̩]; born 29 April 1968 in Hamburg) is a German actor and producer. One of the most successful character actors in German cinema, he first broke out in 1992 with his role in Little Sharks.

== Biography ==
Vogel is the son of a Hamburg waiter and a housewife. He worked as a child model, later had various jobs and visited the Munich drama school for one day. In 1985, he moved to Berlin, where he shared a flat with actor Richy Müller. He states that he was inspired by the movie Taxi Driver, starring Robert De Niro.

Vogel became famous with the movie Little Sharks (German: Kleine Haie) in 1992. He won the Silver Bear award in 2006 for his work as an actor, co-author, and co-producer for the film The Free Will (German: Der freie Wille).

Vogel had his first child, a daughter, Maria (born 1988), from a previous relationship. He married Madeleine Sommerfeld in 1997, adopted her two sons and the couple had a daughter (born 1999). After their divorce, he had another son (born 2009) with assistant director Michelle Gornick. Vogel had his 6th child, a daughter (born 2019) with his fiancée, actress Natalia Belitski. Vogel lives in Berlin.

== Awards ==
- 1989: Bayerischer Filmpreis – best young actor in Rosamunde
- 1992: Bayerischer Filmpreis – best actor in Kleine Haie (Little Sharks)
- 1994: Telestar for Dann eben mit Gewalt (Violence: The Last Resort)
- 1997: Deutscher Filmpreis – best male lead in Das Leben ist eine Baustelle (Life is All You Get)
- 1998: Deutscher Shooting Star
- 2000: Jupiter – best TV Star
- 2001: Adolf-Grimme-Preis for Das Phantom (The Phantom)
- 2003: Goldene Kamera – best German actor in Nackt und Scherbentanz (Shattered Glass)
- 2006: 42nd Chicago International Film Festival – Silver Hugo Award – best actor in Der freie Wille (The Free Will)
- 2006: Tribeca Film Festival, New York – best male lead in Der freie Wille (The Free Will)
- 2006: Silberner (silver) Bär in the category of special artistic performance in Der freie Wille (The Free Will)
- 2007: Bayerischer Filmpreis – best male lead in Emmas Glück (Emma's Bliss)
- 2007: Ernst-Lubitsch-Preis for his roles in Ein Freund von mir (A Friend of Mine) and Wo ist Fred? (Where is Fred?)
- 2009: Jupiter – best actor in Die Welle (The Wave)
- 2010: Herbert-Strate-Preis

== Selected filmography ==
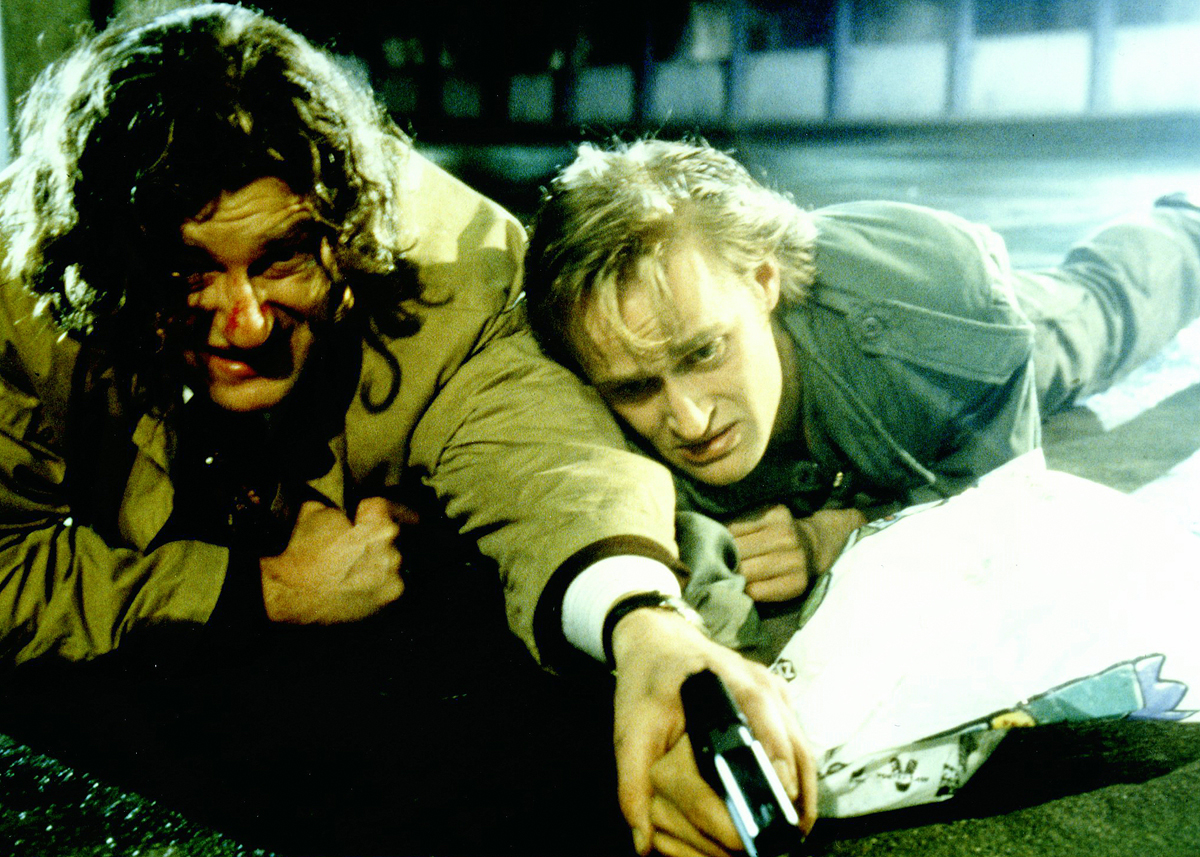
Vogel (right) in Polizeiruf 110: Kleine Dealer, große Träume (1996)

=== Films ===
Year	Title	Role	Director	Notes
1989	Boomerang Boomerang	Pit Malek	Hans W. Geißendörfer	
1990	Rosamunde	Emil	Egon Günther	
1992	Little Sharks	Ingo Hermann	Sönke Wortmann	
1992	Blame It on the Bossa Nova	Charly	Bernd Schadewald	TV film
1993	Violence: The Last Resort	Martin	Rainer Kaufmann	TV film
1993	Durst	Arthur	Martin Weinhart	TV film
1993	Soccer Love	Lalla	Bernd Schadewald	TV film
1993	Polski Crash	Piet Nickel	Kaspar Heidelbach	TV film
1994	Shameless	Freddie	Horst Johann Sczerba	TV film
1994	Angst	Andy Demski	Bernd Schadewald	TV film
1994	Constable Zumbühl	Albin	Urs Odermatt	
1994	The Little Innocent	Max	Rainer Kaufmann	TV film
1995	The Meds	Leo	Matthias Glasner	
1995	Silent Night	Frank	Dani Levy	
1996	Sexy Sadie	Edgar	Matthias Glasner	
1997	Smilla's Sense of Snow	Nils Jakkelsen	Bille August	
1997	Life is All You Get	Jan Nebel	Wolfgang Becker	
1997	Buddies	Henrik	Roland Suso Richter	TV film
1997	Child Murder	Andreas Menzel	Bernd Böhlich	TV film
1997	The Pharmacist	Levin Graber	Rainer Kaufmann	
1998	Der Pirat	Jan	Bernd Schadewald	TV film
1998	The Big Mambo	Gregor	Michael Gwisdek	
1998	Fat World	Hagen Trinker	Jan Schütte	
1999	A Big Job	Ulrich Raffcyk	Bernd Schadewald	TV film
2000	Das Phantom	Leo Kramer	Dennis Gansel	TV film
2000	Manila	Rudi	Romuald Karmakar	
2000	Angry Kisses	Father Bachman	Judith Kennel	
2001	Emil and the Detectives	Max Grundeis	Franziska Buch	
2001	Sass	Erich Sass	Carlo Rola	
2002	Naked	Boris	Doris Dörrie	
2002	Nogo	Tom	Sabine Hiebler, Gerhard Ertl	
2002	Shattered Glass	Jesko	Chris Kraus	
2003	Mein Name ist Bach	Frederick the Great	Dominique de Rivaz	
2003	Rosenstraße	Arthur von Eschenbach	Margarethe von Trotta	
2003	Good Bye Lenin!	(cameo)	Wolfgang Becker	
2005	No Songs of Love	Markus Hansen	Lars Kraume	
2005	Barefoot	janitor	Til Schweiger	
2006	The Free Will	Theo Stoer	Matthias Glasner	
2006	Emma's Bliss	Max	Sven Taddicken	
2006	A Friend of Mine	Hans	Sebastian Schipper	
2006	Where Is Fred?	Alex	Anno Saul	
2007	Duel at Night	Jonas Birke	Matti Geschonneck	TV film
2007	Treasure Island	Israel Hands	Hansjörg Thurn	TV film
2007	Rabbit Without Ears	as himself	Til Schweiger	
2008	The Wave	Rainer Wenger	Dennis Gansel	
2009	Gravity	Vince Holland	Maximilian Erlenwein	
2009	12 Winter	Mike Roth	Thomas Stiller	
2009	This Is Love	Holger	Matthias Glasner	
2011	Hotel Lux	Siggi Meyer	Leander Haußmann	
2012	Mercy	Niels	Matthias Glasner	
2012	Death of a Cop	Bruno Theweleit	Matti Geschonneck	TV film
2013	Hotel Adlon: A Family Saga	Siegfried von Tennen	Uli Edel	TV miniseries
2013	Sources of Life	Erich Freytag	Oskar Roehler	
2014	High Tide Is Dead on Time	Tom Larson	Thomas Berger	TV film
2014	Stereo	Erik	Maximilian Erlenwein	
2014	Tour de Force			
2014	Wrecked	Georg Kiehl	Sönke Wortmann	
2016	Family!	Lennart Behrwaldt	Dror Zahavi	TV film
2017	Iceman			

=== Television series ===
Year	Title	Role	Notes
1990	Tatort: Rendezvous	Daniel	
1991	Tatort: Blutwurstwalzer	Alex	
1996	Polizeiruf 110: Kleine Dealer, große Träume	Atze Pöhlein	
2002	Tatort: Flashback	Rudi Eltmann	
2004	Tatort: Der vierte Mann	Harry Wolter	
2005	Tatort: Wo ist Max Gravert?	Roman Mielcke	
2009–2011	Schillerstraße	Himself	35 episodes
2016	Nachtschicht: Ladies First	Jacky Herbst	
2018	The Team	Gregor Weiss	8 episodes
