= Götz Otto =

German actor

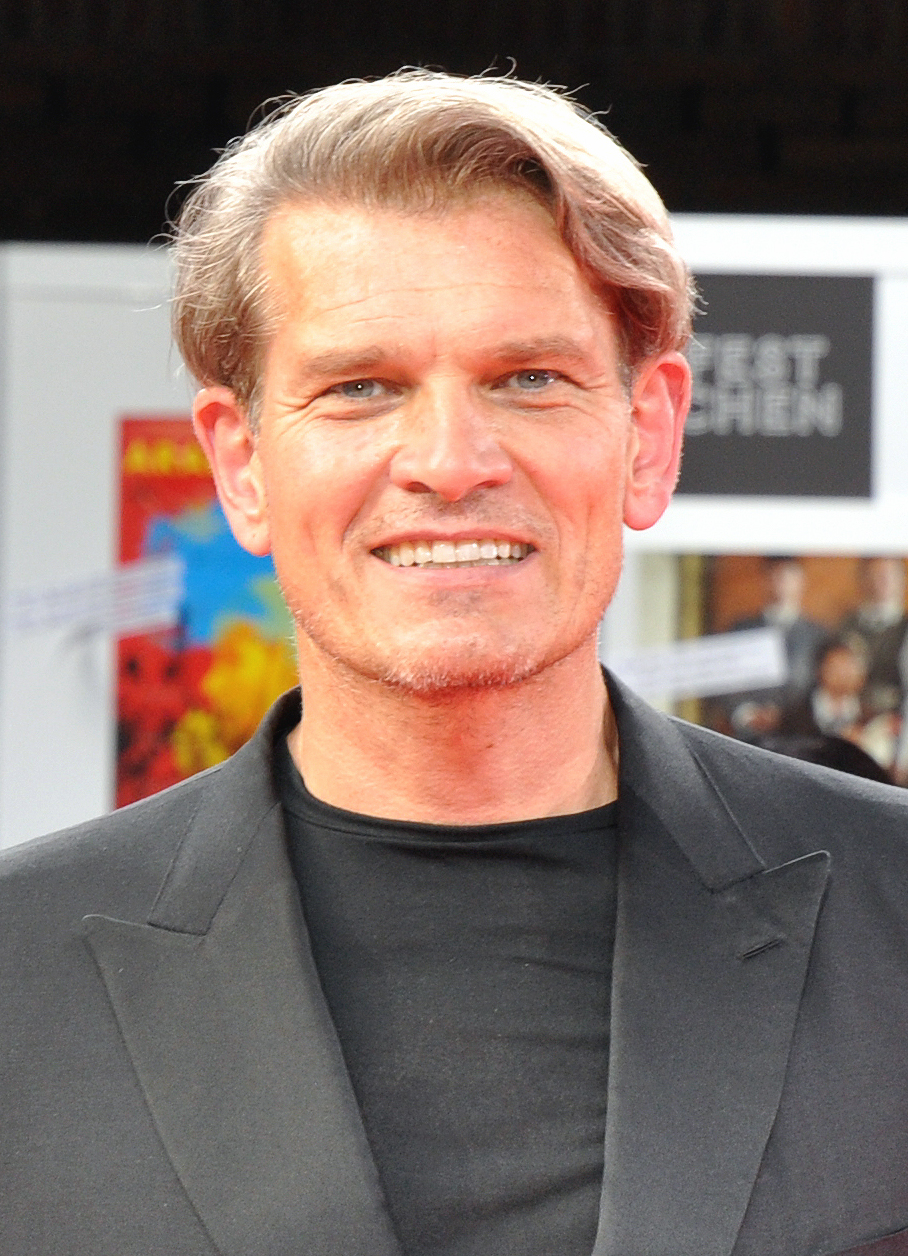
- Otto in 2015
- Born: 15 October 1967 (age 59); Dietzenbach, West Germany
- Occupation: Actor
- Years active: 1989–present
- Spouses: Uschi Maichen; Sabine Louys (m. 2000)
- Children: 4

Götz Otto (born 15 October 1967) is a German film and television actor who is known internationally for his roles as henchman Richard Stamper in the 1997 James Bond film Tomorrow Never Dies, as Adolf Hitler's adjutant Otto Günsche in the 2004 World War II film Downfall, and as Nazi commander Klaus Adler in the 2012 comic science fiction film Iron Sky.

== Biography ==
Otto was born in Dietzenbach and his parents ran a bakery in the city.

He played Mr. Stamper, the villain Elliot Carver's assistant, in the 1997 James Bond film Tomorrow Never Dies. When called for casting, Otto was given twenty seconds to introduce himself. Saying "I'm big, I'm bad, and I'm German", the 198 cm (6 ft 6 inches) actor did it in five.

Otto also played minor roles of epic Nazi films such as the 1993 Steven Spielberg film Schindler's List as an SS guard. He later played the role of SS-Sturmbannführer Otto Günsche in the critically acclaimed 2004 film Downfall. In 2006, he appeared in the UK film Alien Autopsy. His portrayal of Billy the Kid in Bremen in 2011 fulfilled a long-standing desire to act in the Western genre.

In 2012, he starred in the film Iron Sky as the movie's primary antagonist – Moon Nazi officer Adler, who infiltrates the US and plots to become Führer of the Moon Nazi colony.

He has tried his hand to being an occasional race car driver. In 2007, he raced in the German Mini Challenge VIP car at Oschersleben, but, after a strong performance in the first race, he rolled the car on the second turn of race two. He was given another opportunity in the Mini Challenge VIP Car as part of the 2008 German Grand Prix weekend at Hockenheim.

== Filmography ==
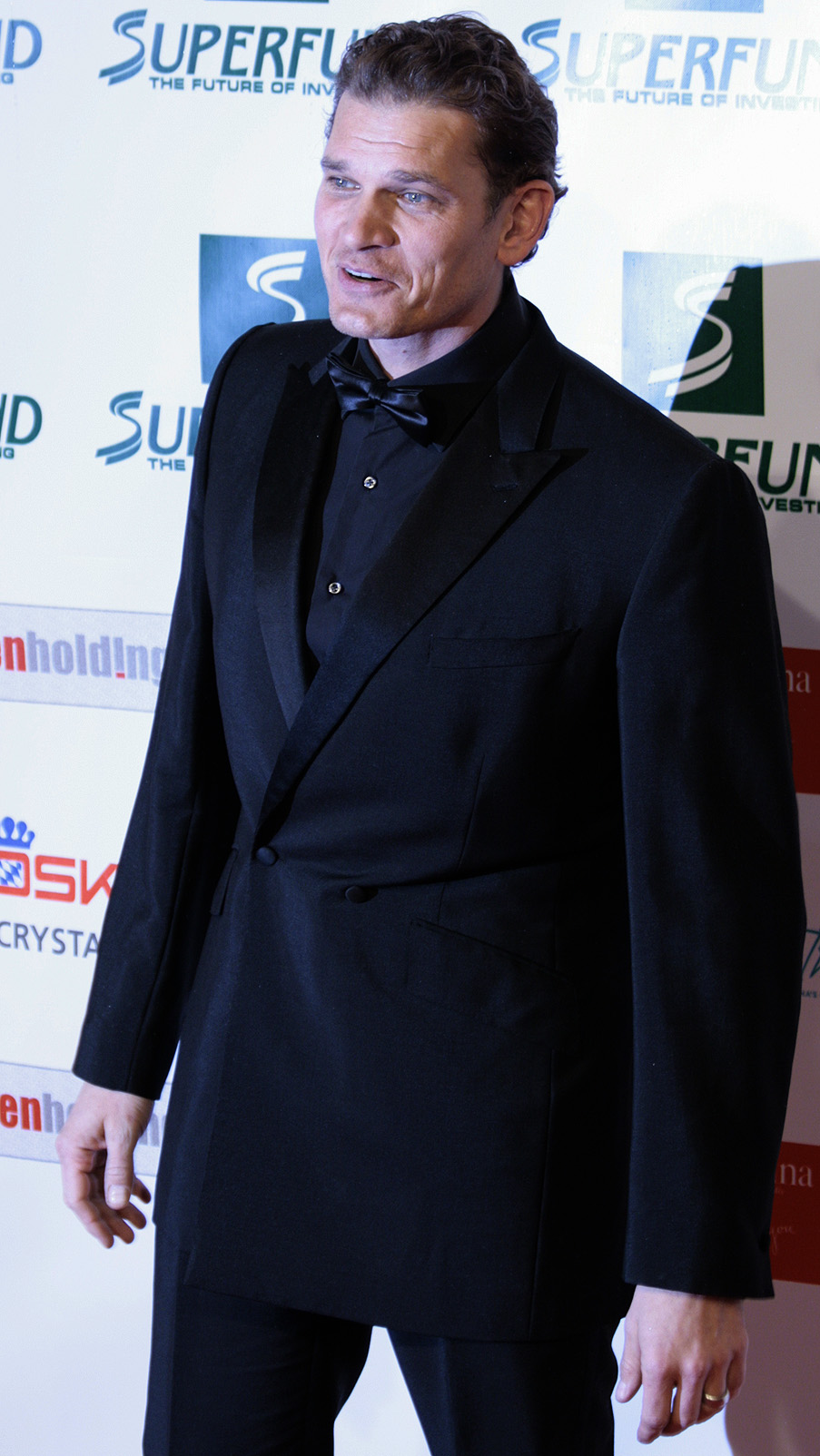
Otto in 2009 at the Women's World Awards

| Year | Title | Role |
|---|---|---|
| 1992 | Little Sharks | Body |
| 1993 | Dann eben mit Gewalt (TV) | |
| 1993 | Hochwürden erbt das Paradies | |
| 1993 | Schindler's List | Plaszow SS Guard #3 |
| 1994 | Lauras Entscheidung | |
| 1995 | Over My Dead Body | Zuhälter 1 (Pimp #1) |
| 1995 | After Five in the Forest Primeval | Türsteher (Bouncer) |
| 1996 | Gridlock (TV) | Mr. Two |
| 1996 | Doppelter Einsatz: Adrenalin (TV) | Bernd Glowacz |
| 1996 | SK-Babies: Countdown (TV) | Michael Landis |
| 1996 | SOKO 5113: Ein interessanter Typ (TV) | Vogel |
| 1996 | Hart to Hart: Till Death Do Us Hart (TV) | Heinrich |
| 1996 | Shine – Die Angst hat einen Namen (Video game) | Wetherby Duke (voice) |
| 1997 | Rosamunde Pilcher: Irrwege des Herzens (TV) | Giles Savours |
| 1997 | Die Friedensmission – 10 Stunden Angst (TV) | |
| 1997 | Kommissar Schimpanski: Die Falle (TV) | LKA-Beamter Lieb |
| 1997 | Tatort: Nahkampf (TV) | Arnold von Brentano |
| 1997 | Der Schutzengel (TV) | Kai |
| 1997 | Tomorrow Never Dies | Mr. Stamper |
| 1998 | Earthquake in New York | Detective Eric Steadman |
| 1998 | The Girl of Your Dreams | Heinrich von Wermelskirch |
| 1999 | Beowulf | Roland |
| 1999 | The Blond Baboon (TV) | Kommissar Philipp Graf |
| 1999 | Framed (Short) | Pfleger #1 (Male Nurse #1) |
| 1999 | Der Voyeur (TV) | Curt Rinneberg |
| 1999 | Ein Weihnachtsmärchen (TV) | Tschak |
| 1999 | The Millennium Disaster: Computer Crash 2000 (TV) | Dan Corpening |
| 2000 | Gunblast Vodka | Abel Rothstein |
| 2000 | Marlene | Gary Cooper |
| 2000 | Bear on the Run | Entfesslungskünstler (Escape artist) |
| 2001 | Der kleine Mann | |
| 2001 | She | Attila |
| 2001 | Zsa Zsa | |
| 2001 | High Adventure | Sarkhan |
| 2001 | Death, Deceit and Destiny Aboard the Orient Express | Boris |
| 2001 | Goebbels und Geduldig | Adjudant |
| 2001 | Dance with the Devil (TV) | Lockvogel |
| 2002 | Planet B: The Antman | Don José de Alvarez |
| 2002 | Edel & Starck: Und ewig lockt der Mann (TV) | Tim Reskau (1 episode) |
| 2002 | El Embrujo de Shanghai | Omar |
| 2002 | Ma femme s'appelle Maurice | Johnny Zucchini |
| 2002 | Family Affairs – Gier nach Glück (TV) | Dave |
| 2003 | Die Pfefferkörner: Crash, Boom, Bäng (TV) | John Quentin |
| 2003 | Planet B: Mask Under Mask | Gomez |
| 2003 | Der Ermittler: Die Zeugin (TV) | Ole Christiansen |
| 2003 | Deep Freeze | Nelson |
| 2003 | Millennium Mann: Brüder (TV) | Roder |
| 2004 | Downfall | Adjutant Otto Günsche |
| 2004 | Ring of the Nibelungs (TV) | King Thorkwin |
| 2004 | Polizeiruf 110 (TV, 3 episodes, 2004–2007) | Paul Reinhardt |
| 2005 | The Clown: Payday | Zorbek |
| 2005 | Apollonia (TV) | Kaplan Johannes Ebner |
| 2005 | Pfarrer Braun: Bruder Mord (TV) | Pater Andreas |
| 2005 | Grenzverkehr | Großer Smetana |
| 2005 | Karl May Festival in Bad Segeberg | Harry Melton |
| 2005 | Stockflame (Short) | Niklas von Dhrei |
| 2005 | Der Todestunnel (TV) | Roman Sikorski |
| 2005 | Urmel aus dem Eis (TV) | König Pumponell |
| 2006 | Balko: Ich töte Mutter (TV) | Lukowski |
| 2006 | Alien Autopsy | Laszlo Voros |
| 2006 | Eva Blond: Epsteins Erbe (TV) | Detlev |
| 2006 | Rettet die Weihnachtsgans (TV) | Alfred |
| 2007 | Die Erntehelferin (TV) | Martin |
| 2007 | Siska: Spiel im Schatten (TV) | Ronald Bergmann |
| 2007 | Doktor Martin: Herzflimmern (TV) | Kurt Bendicks |
| 2007 | SOKO Donau: Eiszeit (TV) | Sascha Gorki |
| 2007 | Für immer Afrika (TV) | Christian Lindenburg |
| 2008 | Ossi's Eleven | Axel Franke |
| 2009 | Betrayal | Krüger |
| 2010 | The Pillars of the Earth (TV) | Walter |
| 2010 | Augustine: The Decline of the Roman Empire (TV) | Genseric |
| 2010 | The Whore (TV) | König |
| 2012 | Iron Sky | Klaus Adler |
| 2012 | Cloud Atlas | Withers |
| 2013 | Legend № 17 | Phil Esposito |
| 2015 | Prinzessin Maleen (TV) | Baron Raimund |
| 2016 | Vesper (Short) | Walter |
| 2016 | The Visitors: Bastille Day | Colonel Wurtz |
| 2019–2020 | Dignity (TV series) | Paul Schäfer (Main role) |
| 2020 | Enfant Terrible | |
