= Züli Aladağ =

German film director

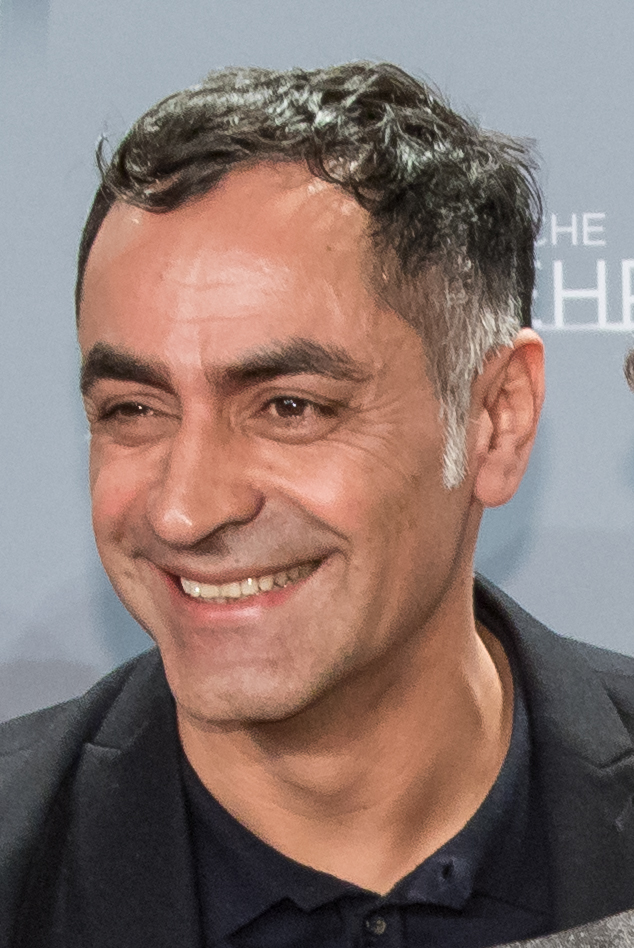
Züli Aladağ

Züli Aladağ (born 2 January 1968, Van, Turkey) is a German film director, film producer, and screenwriter. He is of Kurdish and Turkish descent.

== Biography ==
Aladağ immigrated to Germany in 1973 and grew up in Stuttgart. After a short study of theatre studies at LMU Munich, he completed a six-month internship at Roland Emmerich's Moon 44 in Stuttgart. There, he followed numerous collaborators in shorts, advertisements, plays and documentary films as a production assistant, recording manager and director assistant. Later, he worked as an editor and co-director for documentary TV series. Since 1993, he has worked as a producer, and since 1995, he has been working as a freelance filmmaker on documentary films and feature films. He is often the author of his own books. He graduated from the Academy of Media Arts in Cologne in the summer of 1999.

His 2005 controversial drama, Rage (2006), was awarded several times.

In 2008, he directed a series of episodes of the television series Die Anwälte and KDD – Kriminaldauerdienst.

Aladağ is the founder of the Young European Cinema initiative. The filmmaker was married, from 2002 to 2012, to Feo Aladağ, with whom he founded his own film production company with in 2006. Since 2002, Aladağ has lived in Berlin.

== Exhibitions ==
- 2010/2011: Die Anderen, Ausstellungsreihe Labor Berlin 3 in the Haus der Kulturen der Welt

== Awards ==
- 1999: Prize of North Rhine-Westphalia for Film
- FFA-Kurz film prize for "Short Tiger 2000"
- 2001: Wilhelm Bitter Prize
- "Special recognition" by the German Academy of Performing Arts at the Baden TV Film Festival 2006 for the entire production team of Rage
- 2007: Golden Camera Award by Hörzu for Rage.
- 2007: Grimme-Preis for Rage
- 2007: GLAAD Media Award for Rage
- 2010: Deutscher Filmpreis for producing When We Leave

== Filmography (selection) ==
- 1991/1992: Freispiel – Acting, recording
- 1992: The Parrot – Recording
- 1997: Hör dein Leben – Director, producer, scriptwriter, editor
- 1997: Zoran – Director, scriptwriter
- 1999: Bevor der Tag anbricht – Director, scriptwriter, editor
- 1999: Der Ausbruch – Director, scriptwriter, editor
- 1999: Enter – Producer
- 2001/2002: Elephant Heart – Director, scriptwriter
- 2003: Tatort – Mutterliebe – Director, scriptwriter
- 2004: Die Türken kommen (Documentary film)
- 2005: Tatort – Erfroren – Director
- 2006: Rage – Director
- 2010: When We Leave – Producer
- 2010: Countdown – Die Jagd beginnt – Director (two episodes)
- 2010–2011: Der Kriminalist – Director (four episodes), scriptwriter (one episode)
- 2013: 300 Words of German, 300 Worte Deutsch – Director, scriptwriter
- 2014: Die Fahnderin – Director
- 2015: Tatort – Schwerelos – Director
- 2016: Tatort – Im gelobten Land – Director
- 2016: NSU German History X: The Victims – Director

== Performances ==
- 2012: Neden? (Warum?), UA: Januar 2012 Ballhaus Naunynstraße, Berlin-Kreuzberg

== Literature ==
- Valerie Smith (Ed.): Die Anderen, Haus der Kulturen der Welt, Berlin 2010, ISBN 978-3-9812080-4-7.
