= Michael Mendl =

German actor (1944–2026)

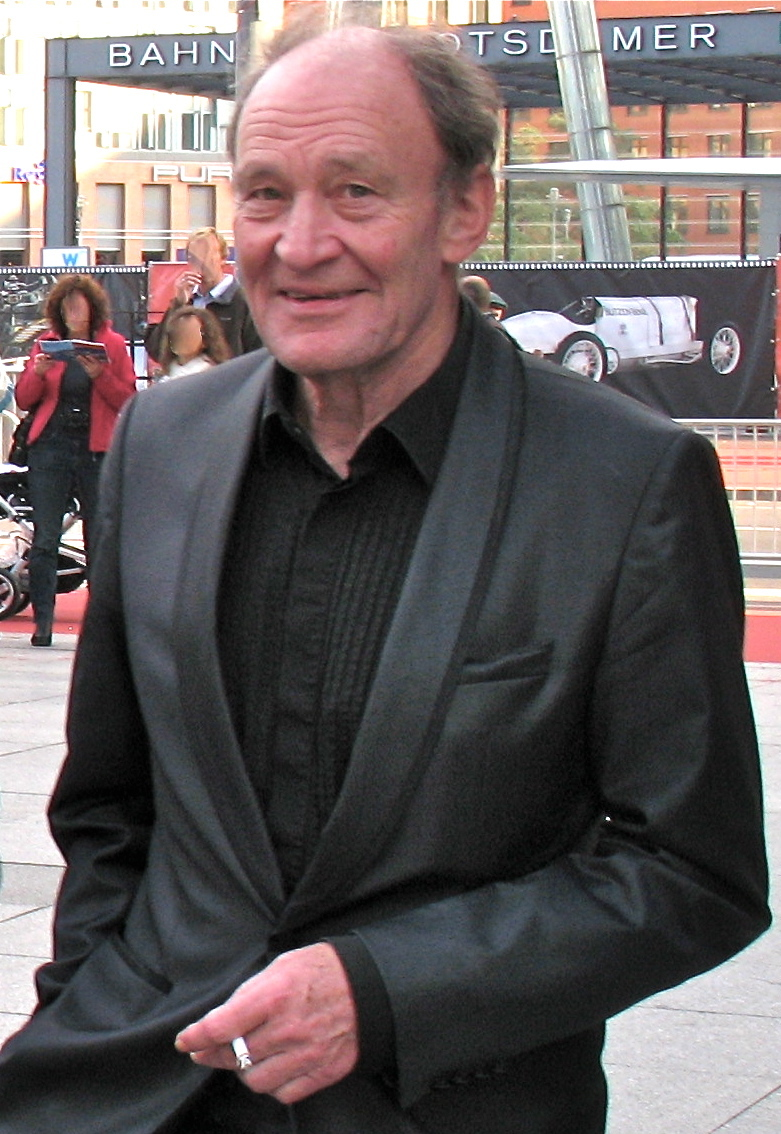
- Mendl in 2010
- Born: Michael Sandrock; 20 April 1944; Lünen, Gau Westphalia-South, Germany
- Died: 5 September 2026 (aged 82); Berlin, Germany
- Occupation: Actor
- Years active: 1975–2026

Michael Mendl (né Sandrock; 20 April 1944 – 5 September 2026) was a German actor. He appeared in more than 100 films and television productions. Mendl is best known internationally for his role of Helmuth Weidling in Downfall, the 2004 film about Adolf Hitler's final days inside the Führerbunker.

In 2025, Mendl was diagnosed with skin cancer. He died from the disease in Berlin, on 5 September 2026, at the age of 82.

== Selected filmography ==
Film
Year	Title	Role	Notes
1992	Silent Shadow	Linda's Father	
1992	Little Sharks	Examiner Essen	
1993	Dann eben mit Gewalt	Schwarz	TV film
1995	Brother of Sleep	Nulf	
1995	Der Mann, der Angst vor Frauen hatte	Briefträger	
1997	The Lost Daughter	Police Inspector Labrousse	TV film
1997	14 Days to Life	Viktor Czernetzky	
1997	Code Red	Robert Scherer	TV film
1998	Andrea and Marie	Ralf	TV film
1998	Die kleine Zauberflöte	Monostatos	Voice
1998	Ms. Diamond	Hartmann	TV film
1998	Mammamia	Martin	TV film
1998	Assignment Berlin	Viktor Borokov	
1998	The Sleeper	Björn	
1999	Gefährliche Wahrheit	Harry Voss	TV film
1999	The Blond Baboon	Hauptkommissar Hannes Bellmann	TV film
1999	Die letzte Chance	Gerd Platzek	TV film
2001	Weiser	Wariat	
2001	Kelly Bastian – Geschichte einer Hoffnung	Gert Bastian	TV film
2001	As Far as My Feet Will Carry Me	Dr. Stauffer	
2001	Amen.	Monsignore Hudal	
2002	John XXIII: The Pope of Peace	Domenico Tardini	TV film
2002	Hiçbiryerde	Gerhard	
2003	Mother Teresa of Calcutta	Van Exem	TV film
2003	In the Shadow of Power	Willy Brandt	TV film
2004	Downfall	Helmuth Weidling	
2005	Barefoot	Heinrich Keller	
2008	The Visit	Alfred Ill	TV film
2008	Lost City Raiders	Cardinal Battaglia	TV film
2010	Takiye: Allah yolunda	Karl Höffgen	
2011	Lilly the Witch: The Journey to Mandolan	Nandi	
2011	Wunderkinder	Aaron Kaplan	
2011	Men in the City 2	Helmut Ades	
2013	A World Beyond	Arthur Landgraf	TV film
2014	Father Rupert Mayer	Jacob Rosenberg	
2015	Half Brothers	Dr. Blöckers	
2016	Fritz Lang	Anton Lang	
2016	Warum Siegfried Teitelbaum sterben musste	Siegfried Teitelbaum	
2016	A Cure for Wellness	Bartender	

TV series
Year	Title	Role	Notes
2017–2019	Dark	Bernd Doppler	4 episodes

== Awards ==
- Bavarian Film Awards for Best Supporting Actor 14 Days to Life (1998)
- Golden camera award for Best German Actor In the Shadow of Power (2004)
- Jupiter Award for Best German TV Actor The Visit (2009)
