= Der Todestunnel =

2005 television film

- Directed by: Dominique Othenin-Girard
- Starring: Aglaia Szyszkowitz; Götz Otto; Rosalinda Celentano; Gedeon Burkhard; Dominic Raacke; August Zirner; Ettore Bassi; Flavio Insinna

Original release
- Release: 2005

Der Todestunnel, known in Italian as 1200º: La Verità della Tunnel della Morte, is a joint production television movie filmed in Austria and Italy, and has both Austrian and Italian actors speaking in their native languages.

== Plot ==
The film opens up as a young prosecutor is handed her toughest assignment: a truck driver charged with reckless driving. She has to prove that he was negligent and kept falling asleep at the wheel. After crashing his semi into a sports car, his rig turns over, gas leaks out, and a fire ensues, shutting down the lights in the long tunnel. Unfortunately, due to the length of the tunnel it is impossible for rescue personnel to get in the tunnel to give adequate medical attention to the people seriously injured. There are several flashbacks, where survivors recall the accident, including a grieving father named Giuseppe Paoletti, portrayed by Flavio Insinna, an Italian family man who is driving his wife and son to Austria, who emotionally describes his account of what happened after the accident.

== Two versions ==
There are two different versions of the film. Der Todestunnel, the original title, is filmed in German with the Italian actors' voices dubbed; the Italian version, 1200º: La Verità della Tunnel della morte, dubs the German actors' voices.

== Background ==
The movie is based on a true story about a catastrophic accident inside the tunnel connecting Austria and Italy. As a result, at least 50 people died of smoke inhalation.
