= 300 Words of German =

2013 German comedy film

300 Words of German (Original title: 300 Worte Deutsch) is a 2013 German comedy film directed by Züli Aladağ. The film plays with cultural peculiarities and clichés regarding Turks living in Germany. The film had its premiere on July 29, 2013 at the Filmfest München (Munich International Film Festival). Theatre showings began on the February 5, 2015. Since August 28, 2015, the film is also available on DVD and Blu-ray.

== Plot ==
Raised with both German and Turkish influences, Lale Demirkan from Cologne is an independent woman at the university and among her friends who leads a life that bridges cultures. At home, however, she remains the model Muslim daughter, as her loving yet traditional father, Cengiz, serves as the prayer leader at the local mosque. On the side, Cengiz also runs a unique matchmaking service that aims to bring Turkish women to Germany to marry willing men from his congregation. His plans run into difficulties due to the strict language requirements enforced by the racist Dr. Ludwig Sarheimer, the head of the Cologne immigration office.

The prerequisite for entry authorization is mastery of 300 words and passive understanding of 650 words of the German language. Dr. Sarheimer wants to have the Turkish women deported as quickly as possible because none of the women speak German. Cengiz tasks Lale with helping the Turkish women through a crash course to pass the crucial 300-word German language test that will prevent their deportation. Despite her moral conflicts, Lale agrees to help.

To complicate things further, the nephew of the racist official and the daughter of the tradition-conscious mosque leader fall in love with each other and thus stir up even more intercultural dust.

== Background ==
Filming took place in Cologne, where the entire film takes place. The film title is an allusion to an (invented) regulation in German immigration law, according to which Turks immigrating to Germany as part of family reunification have to take a language test to prove that they can speak 300 different German words.

The film premiered on June 29, 2013 at the Munich Film Festival. The cinema release was on February 5, 2015. The film has been available on DVD and Blu-Ray since August 28, 2015.

== Criticism ==
A a “fast-paced comedy that counteracts key positions in the so-called integration debate with apt wit and psychological sensitivity. Of course, she doesn't always succeed in convincingly breaking existing clichés when playing with prejudices”.
