= Emil and the Detectives (2001 film) =

2001 German family film

- Theatrical release poster
- Emil und die Detektive
- Directed by: Franziska Buch
- Written by: Franziska Buch
- Based on: Emil and the Detectives (novel) by Erich Kästner
- Produced by: Christoph Holch; Uschi Reich; Susanne van Lessen; Peter Zenk
- Starring: Jürgen Vogel; Maria Schrader; Kai Wiesinger
- Cinematography: Hannes Hubach
- Edited by: Patricia Rommel
- Music by: Biber Gullatz; Eckes Malz
- Distributed by: Constantin Film
- Release date: 22 February 2001 (Germany)
- Running time: 111 minutes
- Country: Germany
- Language: German

Emil and the Detectives (German: Emil und die Detektive) is a 2001 German family film directed by Franziska Buch and starring Tobias Retzlaff, Anja Sommavilla, and Jürgen Vogel. It is based on the classic 1929 novel Emil and the Detectives by Erich Kästner.

== Cast ==
- Tobias Retzlaff as Emil Tischbein
- Anja Sommavilla as Pony Hütchen
- Jürgen Vogel as Max Grundeis
- Maria Schrader as Pastorin Hummel
- Kai Wiesinger as Knut Tischbein
- Tim Hansen as Krumbiegel
- Maurice Kumar as Kebab
- Sergej Moya as Flügel
- Anita Schulz as Elfe
- Annika Schulz as Fee
- Tobias Unkauf as Dienstag
- Maximilian Befort as Gypsi
- David Klock as Gustav Hummel
