= Adieu Paris =

2013 film directed by Franziska Buch

- Promotional poster
- Directed by: Franziska Buch
- Written by: Martin Rauhaus
- Produced by: Stefan Schubert; Ralph Schwingel
- Starring: Jessica Schwarz; Sandrine Bonnaire; Hans Werner Meyer; Gérard Jugnot; Jean-Yves Berteloot; Ina Weisse; Thure Lindhardt
- Cinematography: Hagen Bogdanski
- Edited by: Andrea Mertens
- Music by: Gast Waltzing
- Distributed by: The Match Factory GmbH
- Release date: 11 July 2013 (Germany)
- Running time: 101 minutes
- Countries: Germany; Luxembourg; France
- Languages: German; French

Adieu Paris is a German-Luxembourgish-French film directed by Franziska Buch. The film is also known as Upgrade.

== Plot ==
Patrizia is a successful author. When she learns her allegedly unmarried boyfriend Jean-Jacques lies in a hospital in Paris because he had a grave car accident, she rushes head over heels to the airport. Unfortunately she forgets her credit card and cannot pay the ticket for Paris. By discussing this she causes a deadlock at the counter. A German business man (Frank) who has to stand line behind her fears he might miss his flight and helps her out with some money. So they get to know each other and get together to Paris, where Frank is supposed to handle an International merger. But both of them are confronted by unexpected twists when they arrive. Patrizia finds a French woman named Françoise at the bedside of her lover. Françoise breaks it to her that Jean-Jacques is her husband. Meanwhile Frank discovers that the merger cannot take place because of unforeseen accountancy issues.

== Cast ==
- Jessica Schwarz as Patrizia
- Sandrine Bonnaire as Françoise Dupret
- Hans Werner Meyer as Frank Berndssen
- Gérard Jugnot as Albert
- Jean-Yves Berteloot as Jean-Jacques Dupret
- Ina Weisse as Gloria Berndssen
- Thure Lindhardt as Mika
- Catherine Hosmalin as Madame Colussant
- Silvia Maleen as analyst
