= Kai Wiesinger =

German actor

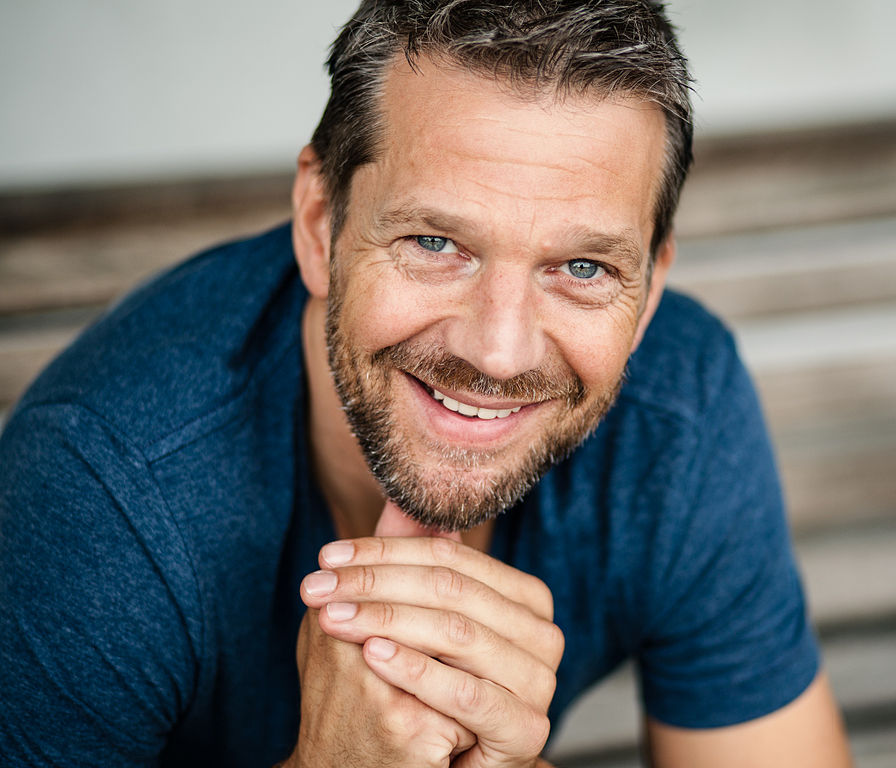
- Wiesinger in 2012
- Born: 16 April 1966 (age 60); Hanover, West Germany
- Occupation: Actor
- Years active: 1992–present
- Website: kaiwiesinger.de

Kai Wiesinger (born 16 April 1966) is a German actor.

== Life and work ==
Wiesinger began taking private acting lessons as a teenager. After his civil service, he became an acting student in Munich. He has been active on German television and in films since 1992.

== Selected filmography ==
=== Film ===
List of film appearances, with year, title, and role shown
Year	Title	Role	Notes
1992	Little Sharks	Johannes	
1994	Der bewegte Mann	Ripper	
1994	Backbeat	Klaus Voormann	
1995	Talk of the Town	René Krauss	
1995	Pakten	Fritz Becker	
1997	14 Days to Life	Konrad von Seidlitz	
1997	Comedian Harmonists	Erwin Bootz	
1999	After the Truth	Peter Rohm	
2001	Emil and the Detectives	Knut Tischbein	
2002	Poppitz	Ben	
2016	Gut zu Vögeln	Tillmann	

=== Television ===
List of television appearances, with year, title, and role shown
Year	Title	Role	Notes
1993	The Young Indiana Jones Chronicles	Jurgen	1 episode
1993	Auf Achse	Toni Teuffel	7 episodes
1998	Terror in the Mall	Chris Maratos	TV film
2001	Murder on the Orient Express	Philip von Strauss	TV film
2002	Dracula	Dr. Seward	2 episodes
2005–21	Tatort	Various characters	3 episodes
2006	Dresden	Simon Goldberg	TV film
2006	Stolberg	Christoph Katzmann	1 episode
2007	Die Anwälte	Sebastian Britten	8 episodes
2009	Ein starkes Team	Harald Berg	1 episode
2010	Until Nothing Remains	Dr. Gerd Ruppert	TV film
2011	Ein Fall für zwei	Stefan Freiberg	1 episode

== Awards and recognition ==
- Bavarian Film Awards, Best Actor in Little Sharks (1992)
- nominated for German Film Award, Best Actor in 14 Days to Life (1997)
- Bavarian Film Awards, Best Actor in 14 Days to Life and Hunger – Sehnsucht nach Liebe (1997)
- Bavarian Film Awards, Special Prize as ensemble member for Comedian Harmonists (1997)
- Bavarian TV Award, Best Actor in Television Film category, Der Rücktritt (2014)
