= Talk of the Town (1995 film) =

1995 German comedy film

- Directed by: Rainer Kaufmann
- Written by: Ben Taylor
- Produced by: Dirk R. Düwel; Henrik Meyer; Bettina Reitz
- Starring: Katja Riemann; August Zirner
- Cinematography: Klaus Eichhammer
- Edited by: Ursula Mai
- Music by: Stefan Traub
- Production companies: Studio Hamburg Produktion; ZDF Enterprises
- Distributed by: Buena Vista International
- Release date: 26 October 1995
- Running time: 93 minutes
- Country: Germany
- Language: German
- Box office: $9.9 million (Germany)

Talk of the Town (German: Stadtgespräch) is a 1995 German comedy film directed by Rainer Kaufmann.

== Cast ==
- Katja Riemann - Monika Krauss
- August Zirner - Erik Kirsch
- Martina Gedeck - Sabine Kirsch
- Kai Wiesinger - René Krauss
- Moritz Bleibtreu - Karl
- Karin Rasenack - Frau Krauss
- Chantal De Freitas - Silke
- Hermann Toelcke - Dieter Klump

== Reception ==
The film was the second most popular German film in Germany for the year, behind Der bewegte Mann, with a gross of 16.3 million Deutsche Mark ($9.9 million).
