= Rage (2006 film) =

2006 film

- Poster
- Screenplay by: Max Eipp
- Directed by: Züli Aladağ
- Starring: Oktay Özdemir; August Zirner
- Music by: Johannes Kobilke
- Country of origin: Germany
- Original language: German

Production
- Producer: Wolf-Dietrich Brücker
- Cinematography: Wojciech Szepel
- Editors: Dora Vajda; Andreas Wodraschke
- Running time: 89 minutes

Original release
- Release: 29 September 2006

Rage (German: Wut) is a 2006 German television crime film directed by Züli Aladağ.

== Cast ==
- Oktay Özdemir - Can
- August Zirner - Simon Laub
- Corinna Harfouch - Christa Laub
- Robert Höller - Felix Laub
- Ralph Herforth - Michael
- Demir Gökgöl - Can's Father
- Melika Foroutan - Dominique
- Yunus Emre Budak - Hakan

== See also ==
- Tough Enough (2006)
