= After Darkness (1985 film) =

1985 film

- DVD cover
- Directed by: Dominique Othenin-Girard; Sergio Guerraz
- Written by: Dominique Othenin-Girard; Sergio Guerraz
- Starring: John Hurt; Julian Sands; Victoria Abril
- Cinematography: William Lubtchansky
- Edited by: Daniela Roderer
- Music by: Benedikt Jeger
- Production companies: T&C Film
- Release date: 1985
- Running time: 104 minutes
- Countries: Switzerland; Great Britain
- Language: English

After Darkness is a 1985 Swiss-British psychological thriller film directed and written by Dominique Othenin-Girard and Sergio Guerraz. Starring John Hurt, Julian Sands and Victoria Abril, it follows a man who takes his brother out of psychiatric care after a suicide attempt. The film was nominated for the Golden Bear at the Berlin International Film Festival and was later restored for a 2025 screening at the Neuchâtel International Fantastic Film Festival.

== Synopsis ==
After his brother is released from a psychiatric clinic, Peter, an anthropology professor, moves into an apartment with him and tries to prevent another suicide attempt. His brother is troubled by dreams of a lost twin, and Peter gradually takes on aspects of the man he is trying to help. Their arrangement is disrupted by the arrival of one of Peter’s colleagues, a former lover who becomes interested in his brother.

== Cast ==
The cast includes:

- John Hurt as Peter
- Julian Sands as Laurence
- Victoria Abril as Pascale
- Pamela Salem as Elisabeth
- William Jacques as Dr. Coles

== Reception ==
=== Awards and nominations ===
In 1985, After Darkness was nominated for the Golden Bear at the Berlin International Film Festival.

=== Critical response ===
Filmdienst described After Darkness as a visually strong feature-film debut with a sensitively acted lead performance, while finding that its shifting, sometimes unclear narrative structure made it harder to follow. Pierre-Yves Walder, director of the Neuchâtel International Fantastic Film Festival, described the film as a compelling English-language psychological thriller with atmospheric photography. Le Temps described it as one of the most intriguing French-speaking Swiss films of the previous forty years, noting that the 1985 psychological suspense film had long remained out of view.

== Festival screenings ==
In 1985, the film was screened at the Locarno Film Festival and the Tokyo International Film Festival. In 2025, the Neuchâtel International Fantastic Film Festival presented a restored version of the film at Filmo’s initiative.
