= Sources of Life =

2013 film

- Film poster
- German: Quellen des Lebens
- Directed by: Oskar Roehler
- Produced by: Stefan Arndt; Oliver Berben
- Starring: Jürgen Vogel; Meret Becker
- Cinematography: Carl-Friedrich Koschnick
- Edited by: Peter R. Adam
- Music by: Martin Todsharow
- Production company: X-Filme Creative Pool
- Distributed by: X-Verleih AG (though Warner Bros.)
- Release date: 14 February 2013
- Running time: 174 minutes
- Country: Germany
- Language: German

Sources of Life (German: Quellen des Lebens) is a 2013 German film directed by Oskar Roehler.

== Cast ==
- Jürgen Vogel as Erich Freytag
- Moritz Bleibtreu as Klaus Freytag
- Kostja Ullmann as Young Klaus Freitag
- Meret Becker as Elisabeth Freytag
- Sonja Kirchberger as Marie Freytag
- Lavinia Wilson as Gisela Ellers
- Leonard Scheicher as Robert Freytag, 13–17 years
- Lisa Smit as Laura, 13–17 years
- Margarita Broich as Hildegard Ellers
- Thomas Heinze as Martin Ellers
- Rolf Zacher as Erwin
