= The Free Will =

- Directed by: Matthias Glasner
- Written by: Judith Angerbauer; Matthias Glasner; Jürgen Vogel
- Produced by: Frank Döhmann; Christian Granderath; Andrea Hanke
- Starring: Jürgen Vogel; Sabine Timoteo
- Cinematography: Matthias Glasner; Ingo Scheel
- Edited by: Mona Bräuer; Matthias Glasner; Julia Wiedwald
- Release date: 13 February 2006 (Berlin)
- Running time: 163 minutes
- Country: Germany
- Languages: German, French

The Free Will (German: Der freie Wille) is a 2006 German drama film directed by Matthias Glasner. It premiered in competition at the 56th Berlin International Film Festival in February 2006 and was awarded two prizes: Jürgen Vogel received a Silver Bear for Outstanding Artistic Contribution, and director Matthias Glasner received the Prize of the Guild of German Art House Cinemas. The film was also shown at various film festivals throughout 2006 and 2007, and Jürgen Vogel received Best Actor awards at Chicago International Film Festival and Tribeca Film Festival.

== Plot ==
Theo Stoer, a frustrated kitchen hand, rapes a young cyclist on the Baltic coast. He is arrested a few hours later. For this crime and two other rapes, the court sends him to a secure psychiatric institution for court-ordered treatment. After nine years, Theo is released on probation into a supervised shared apartment in Mülheim an der Ruhr.

Probation officer Sascha arranges a job for Theo in a print shop. To let off steam, he does strength training and a martial arts; he satisfies his sexual needs by masturbating. In everyday life, Theo finds it difficult to control himself and to approach people. He is interested in a waitress at the Pizzeria Trattoria Funghi, but does not dare to speak to her. When Sascha encourages him, he manages to overcome his anxiety. However, she refuses to go out with him.

One day Theo meets Nettie, the distraught daughter of the widowed print shop owner. Despite initial difficulties, they begin to get closer emotionally. Before a real relationship can develop, however, Nettie begins an internship at a Belgian praline factory. The probation officer is fired and moves to Berlin, leaving Theo alone. One evening he is about to rape a saleswoman who was serving him in a department store just before closing time. He secretly follows on the subway and to her apartment. But he pulls himself together and leaves the apartment unnoticed.

Theo pays a surprise visit to Nettie in Belgium. When he can't find his own hotel room on a rainy evening, Nettie takes him to her room, where he secretly lies down next to her at night. Theo picks up Nettie after work and they to a church, where he has prepared a surprise for her: the organ plays and a soprano sings the song "Ave Maria", which was on the radio the night before.

Theo and Nettie get together, but quickly realize that they are both tormented souls. While Theo has to deal with his desire for women, Nettie has had to deal with her father 's psychological attacks for years. When Nettie returns to Mülheim, Theo moves in with her.

Back in Germany, Theo realizes that he will never be able to suppress his urges. When Nettie goes out one evening without him, he wanders the streets and rapes another woman.

When both return home, Theo tells his girlfriend about his past and breaks up with her. He also admits that he relapsed the day before. She flees to her father. When she returns to the apartment the next day, the furniture is smashed and Theo has disappeared.

Nettie seeks out a woman who was raped by Theo nine years ago. The woman initially assumes that Nettie is also a rape victim and goes with her to a café. Nettie confesses that she is not a victim, but that Theo is a friend and that she got the woman's address from a journalist. The woman follows Nettie to the toilet, hits her, forcibly pulls her pants down and abuses her.

Nettie suspects that Theo has gone to Sascha in Berlin. She manages to find the two. She secretly pursues Theo and observes that he is interested in a young woman going home alone and is following her. She loses them both in the bustle of a fair.

Theo disappears at the train station the next morning, Nettie follows him on the train to the seaside. While he is at a hotel bar, she convinces a receptionist to give her a key to his room “as a friend” and discovers that he had already set out razor blades to attempt suicide in a full bathtub. She leaves the hotel in shock. Later she decides to and returns to the room, the water is drained and the blades are gone.

She finds him on the beach at night and is unable to prevent him from slitting his wrists there in her presence. She lets it happen and holds him in her arms, where he gradually bleeds to death.

== Cast ==
- Jürgen Vogel as Theo Stoer
- Sabine Timoteo as Netti Engelbrecht
- André Hennicke as Sascha
- Manfred Zapatka as Claus Engelbrecht
- Judith Engel as Anja Schattschneider
- Anna Brass as raped woman in the dunes
- Maya Bothe as Sybille
- Frank Wickermann as Michael
- Marcel Batangtaris as Toni
