= 12 Winter =

2009 film

- DVD cover
- Written by: Thomas Stiller; Holger Karsten Schmidt
- Directed by: Thomas Stiller
- Starring: Jürgen Vogel; Axel Prahl
- Theme music composer: Peter Scherer
- Country of origin: Germany
- Original language: German

Production
- Producers: Bettina Brokemper; Martin Zimmermann
- Cinematography: Marc Liesendahl
- Editor: Ulrike Leipold
- Running time: 89 minutes

Original release
- Network: Das Erste; Arte
- Release: 1 May 2009

12 Winter (German: Zwölf Winter) is a 2009 German television film directed by Thomas Stiller which stars Jürgen Vogel and Axel Prahl. The film was produced by Martin Zimmermann and Bettina Brokemper while the screenplay was written Holger Karsten Schmidt. The film is based on the true story of two bank robbers who robbed a series of small banks throughout Germany. The two were pursued by police for more than 12 years before they were captured in August 2002.

== Cast ==
- Jürgen Vogel as Mike Roth
- Axel Prahl as Klaus Starck

== Awards ==
- 2010: Nominated for Adolf Grimme Award in the category of "fiction"
- 2010: Nominated for German TV thriller price
- 2010: Won Jupiter Award for "Best TV Film"
