= Mercy (2012 film) =

2012 film

- Film poster
- German: Gnade
- Directed by: Matthias Glasner
- Written by: Kim Fupz Aakeson
- Produced by: Andreas Born; Matthias Glasner; Kristine Knudsen
- Starring: Jürgen Vogel; Birgit Minichmayr
- Cinematography: Jakub Bejnarowicz
- Edited by: Heike Gnida
- Music by: Homesweethome
- Distributed by: Alamode Film (Germany)
- Release date: 16 February 2012 (Berlin)
- Running time: 132 minutes
- Country: Germany
- Languages: German, Norwegian, English

Mercy (German: Gnade) is a 2012 German drama film directed by Matthias Glasner. The film was shown in competition at the 62nd Berlin International Film Festival in February 2012. The film is about a German couple and their teenage son who emigrate to the north of Norway.

== Cast ==
- Jürgen Vogel as Niels
- Birgit Minichmayr as Maria
- Henry Stange as Markus
- Ane Dahl Torp as Linda
- Maria Bock as Wenche
- Stig Henrik Hoff as Björn
- Iren Reppen as Sofie
- Richard André Knutsen as Mikkel
- Kristoffer Mortensen as Ole
- Katharina Strauch as Stine
- Bjørn Sundquist as Mads
- David Hjelle Pettersen as Petter
