= 14 Days to Life =

1997 German thriller film

- 14 Tage lebenslänglich
- Directed by: Roland Suso Richter
- Screenplay by: Holger Karsten Schmidt
- Produced by: Martin Heldmann; Werner Koenig
- Starring: Kai Wiesinger; Michael Mendl
- Cinematography: Martin Langer
- Edited by: Peter R. Adam
- Music by: Ulrich Reuter; Christoph Gracian Schubert
- Release date: 3 April 1997
- Running time: 105 minutes
- Country: Germany
- Language: German

14 Days to Life (German: 14 Tage lebenslänglich) is a 1997 German thriller film directed by Roland Suso Richter.

== Plot ==
Young lawyer Konrad von Seidlitz is celebrating his engagement with Cornelia, the daughter of justice minister Friedemann Volkerts. He hasn't paid his parking fines for two years, and as a publicity stunt to boost his career, he insists on being sentenced to jail for two weeks as punishment. While inside, he behaves arrogantly, believing that his knowledge of the system will protect him. He manages to make a few enemies, however, and one day prior to his release, two hundred grams of cocaine are found in his cell during a search. Instead of being released after two weeks as planned, he is sentenced to two years without parole for drug trafficking as a result of a plot by his law firm partner Axel Häring, who is having an affair with Seidlitz's fiancée.

Seidlitz now discovers the harsh reality of everyday prison life. He is humiliated and his reputation destroyed. As he gradually learns how to adapt to his new situation, he befriends another prisoner, Viktor Czernetzky, who helps him uncover the intrigue and restore his reputation. Seidlitz escapes his confinement with the help of the prison doctor, among others, but later returns voluntarily in order to secure the support of his fellow prisoners for the fight against Häring. A showdown takes place in court between the former law firm partners and Häring is sentenced to a five-year prison term. Seidlitz believes he has left the nightmare behind him; however, his connections to the criminal underworld eventually catch up with him. He is forced into a hopeless life and death situation and must save his friend Czernetzky by committing murder.

== Cast ==
- Kai Wiesinger as Konrad von Seidlitz
- Michael Mendl as Viktor Czernetzky
- Katharina Meinecke as Dr. Annika Hofer
- Axel Pape as Axel Häring
- Sylvia Leifheit as Cornelia Volkerts
- Jürgen Schornagel - Kaschinski
- Axel Milberg - Roland Kleinschmidt
- Marek Włodarczyk as Ramon
- Detlef Bothe as Rudi
- Rolf Illig as Schröder
- Hubert Mulzer as Sergeant Major Kaiser
- Bernd Stegemann as Kruse
- Peter Fitz as prison warden
- Heinz Trixner as Justice Minister Friedemann Volkerts
- Ulrich Bähnk as prosecutor
