= Dann eben mit Gewalt =

1993 film

- Written by: Jan de Zanger; Klaus Richter
- Directed by: Rainer Kaufmann
- Starring: Jasmin Tabatabai; Jürgen Vogel; Thomas Heinze
- Country of origin: Germany
- Original language: German

Original release
- Release: 1993

Dann eben mit Gewalt (also known as Violence: The Last Resort) is a 1993 German television film. It is based on a novel by Jan de Zanger.

== Cast ==
- Thomas Heinze as Alex
- Jasmin Tabatabai as Aysche
- Jürgen Vogel as Martin
- Volker Ranisch as Rudi
- David Steffen as Hassan
- Regula Grauwiller as Anne
- Thomas Luft as Stefan Koslowski
- Herbert Schäfer as Didi
- Götz Otto as Keule
- Jürgen Schmidt as Martin's father
- Christine Buchegger as Mrs. Schroth
- Adele Neuhauser as Teacher
- Michael Greiling as Headmaster
- Heinrich Schafmeister as Police Inspector (as Hinrich Schafmeister)
- Suavi Eren as Aysche's father
- Krista Posch as Aysche's mother
- Michael Mendl as Schwarz
- Charles Korvin
- Wilhelm Beck
- Ulrich Frank
- Claudia Pielmann
- Silvan-Pierre Leirich
