= Ingrid Noll =

German novelist

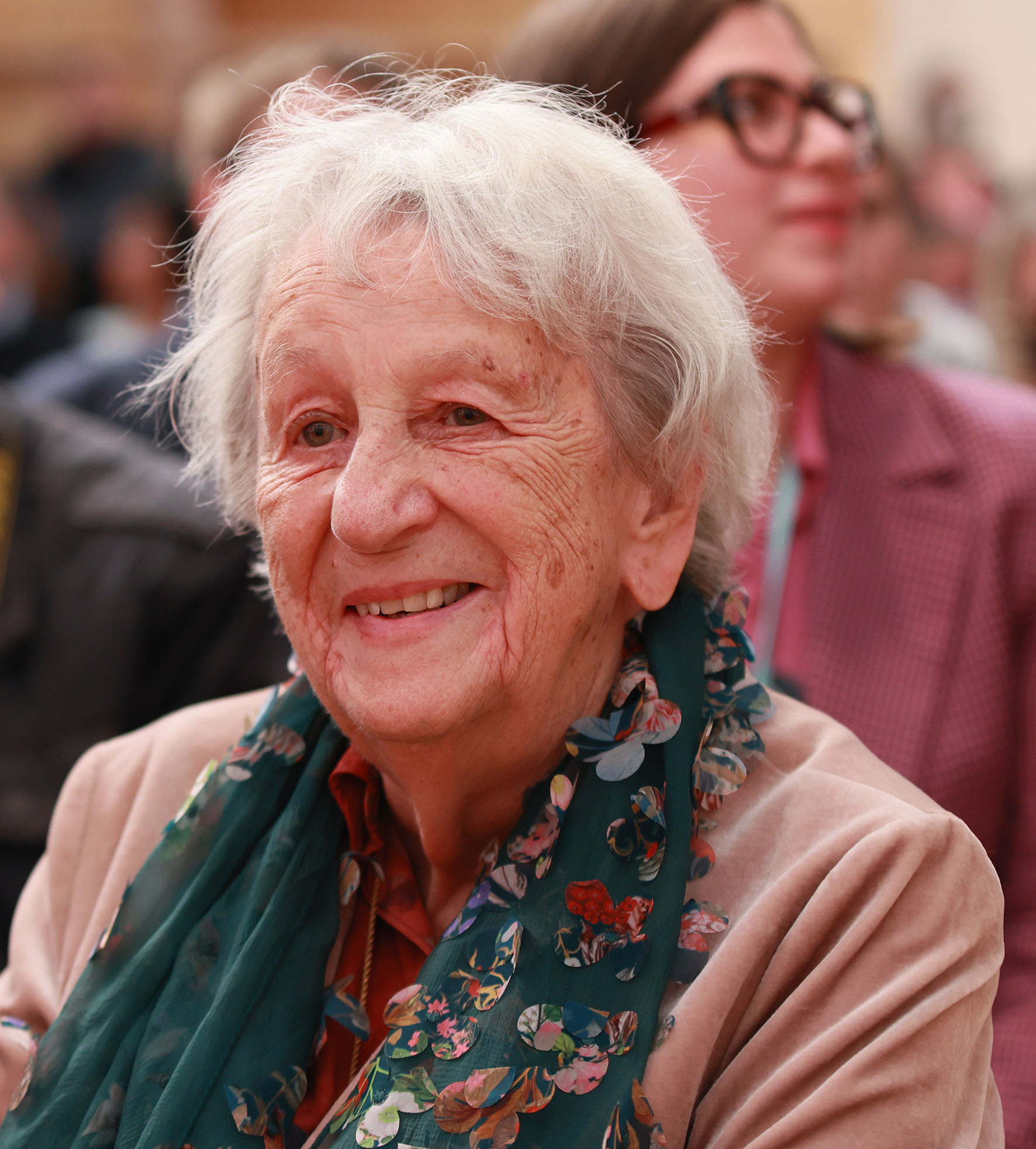
- Noll in Frankfurt am Main, Germany, 2022
- Born: 29 September 1935 (age 89); Shanghai, China
- Other names: Ingrid Gullatz
- Occupation: Writer
- Years active: 1990–present
- Notable work: Head Count; Hell Hath No Fury; The Pharmacist; Bommels Billigflüge

Ingrid Noll (married name Ingrid Gullatz, born 29 September 1935 in Shanghai) is a German thriller writer. She has written several novels, including Head Count (Die Häupter meiner Lieben), Hell Hath No Fury (Der Hahn ist tot) and The Pharmacist (Die Apothekerin), as well as one television drama, Bommels Billigflüge. Several of her novels have been subsequently adapted as films, including Die Apothekerin, which was released in the United States as The Pharmacist and was nominated for the German Film Award in Gold for outstanding feature film. She published her first novel, which became a great success, at the age of 55. Today she is one of the most popular German female authors.

== Filmography ==
- The Pharmacist, directed by Rainer Kaufmann (1997, based on Die Apothekerin)
- Tails You Win, Heads You Lose, directed by Hans-Günther Bücking (1999, based on Die Häupter meiner Lieben)
- Der Hahn ist tot, directed by Hermine Huntgeburth (2000, TV film, based on Der Hahn ist tot)
- Kalt ist der Abendhauch, directed by Rainer Kaufmann (2000, based on Kalt ist der Abendhauch)
- Vater aus Liebe, directed by Imogen Kimmel (2008, TV film, based on a novel by Ingrid Noll)
- Ladylike – Jetzt erst recht!, directed by Vanessa Jopp (2009, TV film, based on Ladylike)

=== Screenwriter ===
- Bommels Billigflüge (1993, TV film)
