= Klimawechsel =

- Created by: Doris Dörrie
- Directed by: Doris Dörrie; Vanessa Jopp; Gloria Behrens
- Starring: Maria Happel; Ulrike Kriener; Juliane Köhler; Andrea Sawatzki; Maren Kroymann
- Country of origin: Germany

Klimawechsel is a German television series.

== See also ==
- List of German television series
