= The Pharmacist (1997 film) =

1997 film

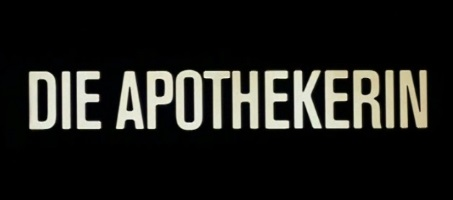
- Directed by: Rainer Kaufmann
- Starring: Katja Riemann; Jürgen Vogel
- Release date: 2 October 1997
- Running time: 1h 48min
- Country: Germany
- Language: German

The Pharmacist (German: Die Apothekerin) is a 1997 German comedy film based on the eponymous novel by Ingrid Noll.

== Cast ==
- Katja Riemann – Hella Moormann
- Jürgen Vogel – Levin Graber
- Richy Müller – Dieter Krosmansky
- Isabella Parkinson – Margot Krosmansky
- August Zirner – Pawel Siebert
- Dagmar Manzel – Dorit Meissen
- Andrea Sawatzki – Alma Siebert
- Joachim Tomaschewsky – Hermann Graber
- Daniele Legler – Gero
- Eva Ingeborg Scholz – Gudrun Moormann
- Friedrich von Thun – Rolf Moormann
- Jan-Gregor Kremp – Bob Moormann
- Dominic Raacke – Kripobeamter
