= Dominique Othenin-Girard =

Swiss-French film director

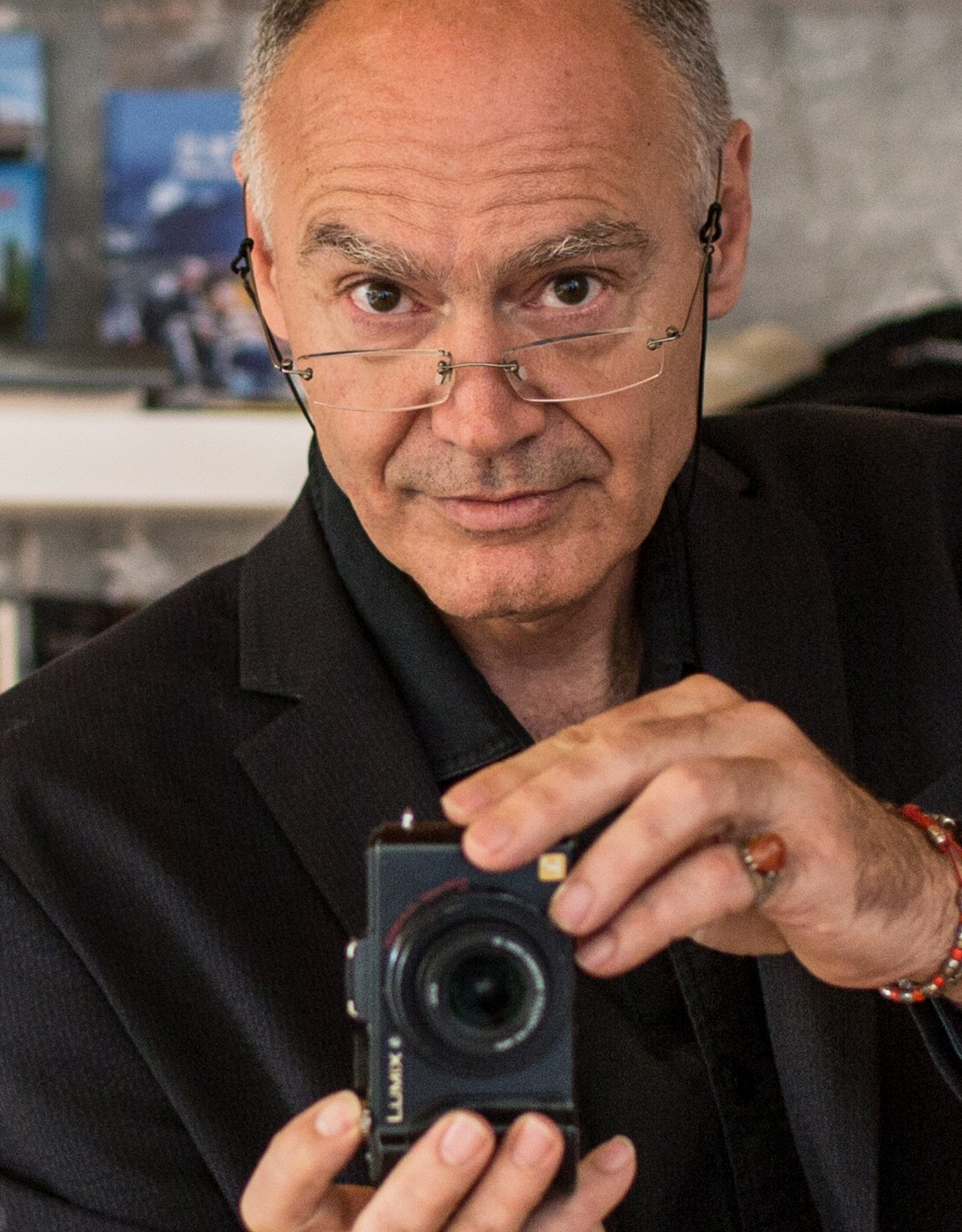
- Otherin-Girard in 2014
- Born: 13 February 1958 (age 68); Le Locle, Neuchâtel, Switzerland
- Education: London Film School
- Occupations: Film director, screenwriter, producer
- Years active: 1981–present

Dominique Othenin-Girard (born 13 February 1958) is a Swiss-French film director. He is known for directing such films as After Darkness (1985), which was nominated for a Golden Bear Award, and Halloween 5: The Revenge of Michael Myers (1989), as well as for directing the television miniseries The Crusaders (2001). Othenin-Girard is also active in promoting awareness for Down syndrome.

== Early years ==
Dominique Othenin-Girard was born in 1958 in Le Locle, Neuchâtel, Switzerland, to French painter Ivan Othenin-Girard and Sonia Calame. His early years were spent traveling to lands that were in culturally different from his native Switzerland; first for an extended stay in Greece and then to live in Iran where his father established the Fine Arts Program in Tehran.

At 7 years old he returned to Switzerland with his mother, brother and sister, where he remained until going to the United States as an exchange student when he was 16 years old. He began studying photography and was accepted at the London Film School.

== Career ==
=== Film director ===
Othenin-Girard graduated from the London Film School with a Masters of Arts in directing and editing. In 1982 he founded his own production company, Dog Productions, to produce, write and direct his first feature film, the psychosocial thriller After Darkness (1984), starring John Hurt with Julian Sands which was nominated for a Golden Bear at the 35th Berlin International Film Festival. He continued to direct film for the TSR and British HTV until 1987 when he moved to Los Angeles. Othenin-Girard directed the 1990 horror film Night Angel, and went on to direct and co-write the 1989 slasher film Halloween 5: The Revenge of Michael Myers.

In 1990, Othenin-Girard's sister-in-law, who has Down syndrome, moved in with his family. This inspired him to tell the story of a family with a child with Down syndrome. To accomplish this he founded the production company Alhena Films SA in Los Angeles to co-write and direct the family drama Sandra: c'est la vie (1992). He took this theme up again by co-writing and directing the German television film Florian: Love with All His Heart, which was RTL's highest rated film and received praise from Down syndrome advocate groups.

In the 1990s and 2000s Othenin-Girard worked in Germany, the US, and Italy, directing films on topics as diverse as organ transplant and action thrillers. During this period one of his major works was The Crusaders, an epic romantic miniseries about the Christian crusaders in the 11th century. He continued producing film for television, for RTS.

After 35 years mostly outside his native land he returned to Switzerland in 2010 to direct, co-create and co-write a 4-hour historical docudrama, Les Suisses, chronicling the history of the Swiss Federation from the 14th to the 19th century. The epic story would take three years to complete and was shot French, German, and Italian; it would represent Othenin-Girard's tribute to his homeland.

In the winter of 1999, Othenin-Girard first traveled to China. In 2007 Othenin-Girard went to Shanghai when his film Der Todestunnel (2004) inspired by the Mont Blanc Tunnel tragedy was nominated for the Shanghai Magnolia Award. These trips were only the start of many which would culminate in a more permanent move. Othenin-Girard is now based in China where he is collaborating with local production companies and is involved in writing and directing his next feature films.

=== Theatre director ===
In 2012, Othenin-Girard produced and directed the one woman show by Rachel Monnat "Rachel et ses Amants". The performance work went to the 2013 Avignon Theater Festival and received rave reviews in the press, before beginning a European Tour (2014).

Currently, Othenin-Girard is one of the Artist committed to the Khloros International Concerts. In 2013 he directed the Khloros Concert "Siem Réap" in Angkor Vat, which was aired live and transmitted in Phnom Peng Royal Park, in 2014, he co-directed the filming of the Khloros Concert at the Forbidden City Concert Hall, Beijing, (with ARTE and CCTV) and in 2015, Othenin-Girard will direct the German opera "Freischutz" (Weber) at the Guangzhou Opera House.

== Partial filmography ==
=== Film and television ===
Year	Title	Credited as			Notes
Year	Title	Director	Writer	Other	Notes
1981	Light Years Away	No	No	Yes	Second assistant director
1985	After Darkness	Yes	Yes	No	Co-directed and written with Sergio Guerraz
1986	Série noire	Yes	Yes	No	1 episode
1989	Halloween 5: The Revenge of Michael Myers	Yes	Yes	No	Co-written with Michael Jacobs and Shem Bitterman
1990	Night Angel	Yes	No	No	
1991	Omen IV: The Awakening	Yes	No	No	Television film Co-directed with Jorge Montesi
1992	Red Shoe Diaries	Yes	No	No	Episode: "Double or Nothing"
1995	Beyond Desire	Yes	No	No	aka The Last American Elvis; aka Payback in Vegas
2001	The Crusaders	Yes	No	No	TV Miniseries

== Nominations and awards ==
(For films directed, including category of best actor)

Year	Film	Nomination/Award
1985	After Darkness	Nominated for the Golden Bear Berlin International Film Festival/ Winner of "Quality Prize" awarded by the Swiss Government
1987	Central nuit (Night Squad): episode "Piège à flics" ("Cop Trap")	Winner Sept D'Or, Best Crime Thriller (France)
1993	Sandra, C'est La Vie	Winner 1st Prize Kinderfilm Festival (Essen, Germany), Winner European Prize for International understanding (Germany), Winner for Best Actress - Lisa Fusco Kinderfilm Festival (Germany)
1998	Die heilige Hure	Nominated 3Sat Audience Award (Germany)
1999	Florian: Love with All His Heart	Winner of the Robert Geisendoerfer Award
2008	Der Todestunnel	Nominated for the Shanghai Magnolia Award: Best TV Film – Dominique Othenin-Girard/ Best Actress – Aglaia Szyszkowitz/ Best Director - Dominique Othenin-Girard
2009	Henry Dunant: Red on the Cross	Winner Mos Film Studio Award in Budapest / Winner of Swiss Film Award «Quartz», 12e Festival international du cinéma et de télévision
2014	The Swiss	Nominated for Prix Walo Best TV Series
