= Franziska Buch =

German film director and screenwriter

- Born: 15 November 1960 (age 65); Stuttgart, Germany
- Occupations: Film director Screenwriter; Film producer
- Years active: 1987-today

Franziska Buch (born 15 November 1960 in Stuttgart) is a German film director and screenwriter. In her work she concentrates on issues that deal with childhood and youth. The main topic in almost all of her movies is family and its difficulty shown out from children's perspectives. Franziska Buch is mainly known for the movie Emil and the Detectives (2001). In addition, she teaches Scriptwriting at the Film Academy in Ludwigsburg since 1996. She is also the principal of the screen-play at film academy of Baden-Württemberg since 2002.

== Career ==
=== Early career –1999 ===
After studying philosophy and German philology at Stuttgart University as well as at Rome University Franziska Buch graduates with an M.A. In 1986 she moved on to the University of Television and Film Munich. She started with the short feature film Die Ordnung der Dinge (The order of things), for which she won the European Short Film Award in Berlin 1987. One year after Buch directed a 45-minute feature film Tod eines Idioten (Death of a fool) that was co-produced with the Bavarian Television. Her graduation film Die ungewisse Lage des Paradieses (The uncertain situation of paradise) is a children's film that shows a girl escaping from reality into a bizarre dreamworld. It was shown in cinemas in 1993 and is to be seen as her debut feature film.

Since 1991, Buch has worked as a freelance author and director. From 1993–1994, Buch was a fellowship-holder at the Screenplay Workshop Munich. She wrote several screenplays for the TV crime series O.K. (1993/1994, Bavaria Film) and Faust (1994/1995, ZDF). At the same time, she completed the 45-minute TV film essay on the life and work of Else Lasker-Schueler, Mein Herz – Niemandem (1994).

=== 1999–2004 ===
Finally she manages the breakthrough with Verschwinde von hier (Disappear out of here) in 1999. The film is about a young man caring affectionately about his partner's son because he is neglected by his mother. The film won the Max-Ophuels Prize in the category "Best Movie" as well as the German Film Award for the best screenplay in 2000. In her further children's and family's movies she continues focussing on the issue of family that is often described from the children's perspectives: The literature filmings of Erich Kästner's Emil and the Detectives (2001) and The Flying Classroom (2002) as well as the comedy Unsere Mutter ist halt anders (2003) (Our Mother is just different) were published. Her commercially most successful movie so far Bibi Blocksberg and the Secret of the Blue Owls (2004) counts 1,3 million spectators and was awarded as the Best film at Chicago International Children's Film Festival.

=== 2004-today ===
In spite of her success with cinema feature films, Franziska Buch shifts her focus to television in the following years. She directs high-quality children, youth and family films such as Heimliche Liebe – Der Schüler und die Postbotin (2005) (Secret Love: The Schoolboy and the Mailwoman) about a boy that falls in love with an older woman while he is on holiday and Patchwork (2008) about two single parents and their attempt to found a family with their kids. Buch's next cinema feature Here Comes Lola! was published in 2010. Similarly to her debut film Die ungewisse Lage des Paradieses (1992) the story is about a girl handling with her problems and fears by escaping into a fantasy world.

This is followed by Adieu Paris (2012), a film showing rather adult topics and problems. Several completely different people meet in the metropolis Paris and start to structure their lives in a new way.

== Filmography ==
Director

- 1987: Die Ordnung der Dinge (The Order of Things)
- 1994: Mein Herz – Niemandem (My Heart – Nobody)
- 2003: Unsere Mutter ist halt anders (Our Mother is just different)
- 2003/2004: Bibi Blocksberg and the Secret of the Blue Owls
- 2007: Angsthasen (Fearful Hares)
- 2009/2010: Here Comes Lola!
- 2010: Rosannas Tochter (Rosanna's Daughter)
- 2011–2013: Adieu Paris

Director and Writer

- 1988: Tod eines Idioten (Death of a Fool)
- 1991/1992: Die ungewisse Lage des Paradieses (The Uncertain Situation of Paradise)
- 1999: Verschwinde von hier! (Disappear out of here)
- 2000/2001: Emil and the Detectives
- 2010/2011: Yoko

Writer

- 1993/1994: O.K.
- 1994/1995: Faust
- 1996: Kinder der Straße (Children of the Street)
- 1996: Babyraub
- 2002: The Flying Classroom
- 2007: Teufelsbraten

Producer

2011/2012: Im Alleingang – Die Stunde der Krähen (In Single-handedly – The Crows' Hour)

== Awards and nominations ==
Awards

- 1999: Producers' Award for the Best Feature Film Production (Verschwinde von hier)
- 2000: Max-Ophuels Prize for the Best Film (Verschwinde von hier)
- 2000: German Television Award for the Best Screenplay (Verschwinde von hier)
- 2001: Bavarian Film Award for the Best Screenplay (Emil and the Detectives)
- 2002: Bavarian Film Award for the Best Children's Film (The flying classroom)
- 2002: German Film Award for the Best Children's Film (The flying classroom)
- 2004: Chicago International Children's Film Festival in the category Best Film (The flying classroom)

Nominations

- 2001: German Film Award (Emil und die Detektive)
- 2004: Adolf Grimme Award (Unsere Mutter ist halt anders)

== Bibliography ==
- www.filmportal.de
- www.kidlixglobal.com
