= Little Sharks =

1992 German comedy film

- Directed by: Sönke Wortmann
- Written by: Jürgen Egger; Sönke Wortmann
- Produced by: Urs Aebersold; Christian Granderath; Gebhard Henke; Harald Kügler; Molly von Fürstenberg
- Starring: Jürgen Vogel; Kai Wiesinger
- Cinematography: Gernot Roll
- Music by: Torsten Breuer
- Production companies: Bayerischer Rundfunk (BR); GAP; Olga Film GmbH; Südwestfunk (SWF); Westdeutscher Rundfunk (WDR)
- Distributed by: Scotia International Filmverleih; UFA Video; Universum Film (UFA)
- Release date: 3 September 1992
- Running time: 1h 27min
- Country: Germany
- Language: German

Little Sharks (German: Kleine Haie) is a 1992 German comedy film directed by Sönke Wortmann.

== Cast ==
- Jürgen Vogel as Ingo
- Kai Wiesinger as Johannes
- Gedeon Burkhard as Ali
- Meret Becker as Herta
- Armin Rohde as Bierchen
- Magdalene Artelt as Margot
- Werner Hansch as Conferencier
- Willi Thomczyk as Cook
- Jürgen Sebert as Foreman
- Michael Mendl as Examiner Essen
- Helmut Stange as Examiner Essen
- Stefan von Moers as Examiner Essen
- Katharina Abt as Portier
- Michael Kessler as Portier
