= Conversations on a Sunday Afternoon =

- Directed by: Khalo Matabane
- Release date: 2005
- Running time: 80 minutes
- Country: South Africa

Conversations on a Sunday Afternoon is a 2005 South African documentary directed by Khalo Matabane. The 80-minute film blends documentary and fiction as it explores the subject of refugees and immigrants living in South Africa, and the diversity of post-Apartheid South African society.
