= Die Anwälte =

German television series

- Starring: Kai Wiesinger
- Country of origin: Germany

Die Anwälte is a German television series about a law firm in Hamburg, broadcast on RTL since 17 January 2008.

== See also ==
- List of German television series
