= Matthias Glasner =

German film director

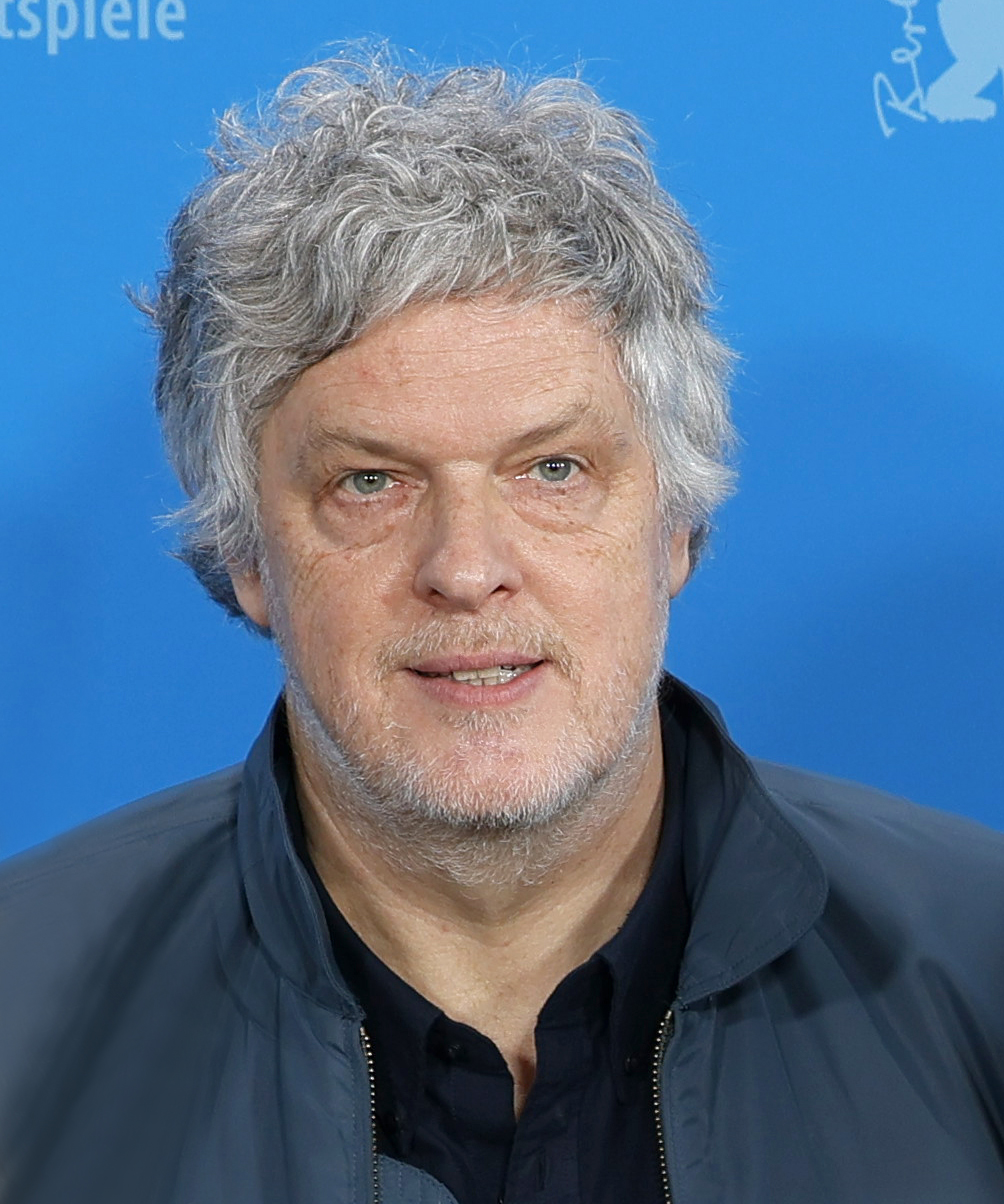
- Matthias Glasner in 2024
- Born: 20 January 1965 (age 61); Hamburg, West Germany
- Occupation: Film director
- Years active: 1987-present

Matthias Glasner is a German film director.

== Selected filmography ==
- The Meds (1995)
- Sexy Sadie (1996)
- Fandango (2000)
- High Score (2001, TV film)
- Tatort: Flashback (2002, TV series episode)
- Die fremde Frau (2003, TV film)
- The Free Will (2006)
- This Is Love (2009)
- Die Stunde des Wolfes (2011, TV film)
- Tatort: Die Ballade von Cenk und Valerie (2012, TV series episode)
- Mercy (2012)
- Blochin (2015, TV miniseries)
- Redemption Road (2017, TV film)
- Polizeiruf 110: Demokratie stirbt in Finsternis (2018, TV series episode)
- Das Boot (2020, TV series, 4 episodes)
- Dying (2024)
