= Rainer Kaufmann =

German film director (born 1959)

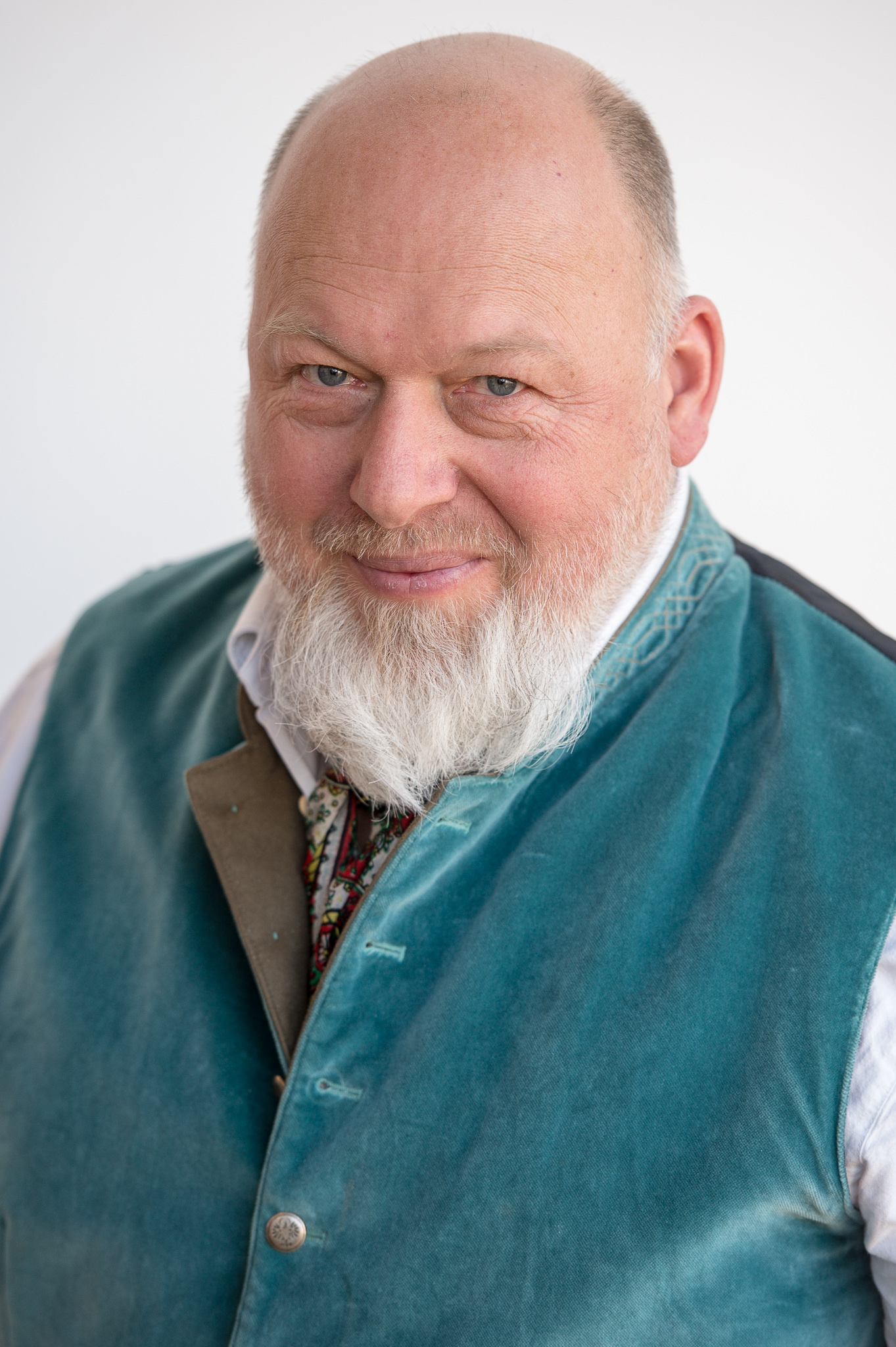
- Born: 6 June 1959 (age 66); Frankfurt, West Germany
- Occupation: Film director
- Years active: 1989–present

Rainer Kaufmann (born 6 June 1959) is a German film director. He directed more than thirty films including The Pharmacist and Operation Sugar, a film about human trafficking.

== Selected filmography ==
- Dann eben mit Gewalt (1993, TV film) — (based on a novel by Jan de Zanger)
- The Little Innocent (1994, TV film)
- One of My Oldest Friends (1995) — (based on a story by F. Scott Fitzgerald)
- Talk of the Town (1995)
- The Pharmacist (1997) — (based on a novel by Ingrid Noll)
- Long Hello and Short Goodbye (1999) — (screenplay by Jeff Vintar)
- Cold Is the Evening Breeze (2000) — (based on a novel by Ingrid Noll)
- Queen of Cherries (2004, TV miniseries) — (based on a novel by Justus Pfaue)
- Marias's Last Journey (2005, TV film)
- Four Daughters (2006, TV film) — (based on a novel by Inger Alfvén)
- Runaway Horse (2007) — (based on a novella by Martin Walser)
- A Grand Exit (2008, TV film)
- The Best Is Yet to Come (2008, TV film)
- Thanksgiving (2009, TV film) — (based on a novel by Volker Klüpfel and Michael Kobr)
- In aller Stille (2010, TV film)
- Blaubeerblau (2011, TV film)
- When the Foehn Wind Is Blowing (2011, TV film) — (based on a novel by Jörg Maurer)
- Milk Money (2012, TV film) — (based on a novel by Volker Klüpfel and Michael Kobr)
- Operation Sugar (2012, TV film)
- Seegrund. Ein Kluftingerkrimi (2013, TV film) — (based on a novel by Volker Klüpfel and Michael Kobr)
- Unexpected (2014, TV film)
- Die Puppenspieler (2017, TV film) — (based on a novel by Tanja Kinkel)
- Der Polizist und das Mädchen (2018, TV film)
- Lost in Separation (2019)
