= List of Warner Bros. International films (1990–1999) =

The following is a list of foreign films produced, co-produced, and/or distributed by Warner Bros. internationally in the 1990s. This does not include direct-to-video releases or films released under joint ventures (e.g. Warner Sogefilms and internationally, Disney).

== 1990 ==
Release Date	Title	Country	Notes
February 15, 1990	Moon 44	Germany	distribution with CineVox only; produced by Centropolis Entertainment

== 1991 ==
Release Date	Title	Country	Notes
January 30, 1991	Le Brasier	France	French, Benelux and Scandinavian distribution only; produced by Flach Film and Solus Productions
April 19, 1991	Red American	Italy	theatrical distribution only; produced by Videa and RAI Tre
April 19, 1991	The Tigress	Germany	theatrical distribution only; produced by CineVox Filmproduktion
November 20, 1991	La Thune	France	distribution only

== 1993 ==
Release Date	Title	Country	Notes
June 17, 1993	Benefit of the Doubt	Germany	distribution in Germany, France and the U.K. only; produced by CineVox Filmproduktion and Benefit Productions
November 19, 1993	My Soul Brother	Spain	distribution only; produced by Fernando Colomo PC and Sogetel

== 1994 ==
Release Date	Title	Country	Notes
February 18, 1994	The Heroes	Italy	theatrical distribution only; produced by Video 80 and Dean Film
October 27, 1994	The NeverEnding Story III	Germany	distribution in Germany, France and the U.K. under Warner Bros. Family Entertainment only; produced by CineVox Filmproduktion, Studio Babelsberg and Dieter Geissler Filmproduktion

== 1995 ==
Release Date	Title	Country	Notes
November 16, 1995	All Men Are Mortal	United Kingdom	distribution only; produced by Nova Films and Sigma Pictures
November 23, 1995	Deathmaker	Germany	distribution only; produced by Pantera Film
December 15, 1995	Viaggi di nozze	Italy	theatrical distribution only; produced by Cecchi Gori Group
December 22, 1995	The Graduates	Italy	theatrical distribution only; produced by Cecchi Gori Group

== 1996 ==
Release Date	Title	Country	Notes
March 21, 1996	Peanuts - Die Bank zahlt alles (Note: Owned by StudioCanal)	Germany	distribution only; produced by Bioskop Film
April 18, 1996	Dangerous Dowry	Germany	distribution in Germany, the U.K., Spain and Brazil only; co-production with Ena Film
October 3, 1996	The Adventures of Pinocchio	Germany	theatrical distribution under Warner Bros. Family Entertainment only; produced by The Kushner-Locke Company, Pangaea Holdings, Twin Continental Films and CineVox
October 18, 1996	Dying to Go Home	Netherlands	distribution only; produced by Taiga Films and Katholieke Radio Omroep
November 29, 1996	The Bandit	Turkey	First WB Turkish film; distribution only; produced by Filmacass

== 1997 ==
Release Date	Title	Country	Notes
March 27, 1997	A Rat's Tale	Germany	distribution under Warner Bros. Family Entertainment only; co-production with Augsburger Puppenkiste and Monty Film
April 7, 1997	Mijn Franse tante Gazeuse (Note: Owned by In The Air)	Netherlands	distribution under Warner Bros. Family Entertainment only; produced by Bos Bros. Film-TV Productions and AVRO
July 17, 1997	Quiet Days in Hollywood	Germany	distribution only; produced by Kick Film
October 2, 1997	The Fearless Four	Germany	distribution under Warner Bros. Family Entertainment only; produced by Munich Animation
October 17, 1997	Live Flesh	Spain; France	Spanish distribution only; produced by El Deseo S.A., Ciby 2000 and France 3

== 1998 ==
Release Date	Title	Country	Notes
Janurary 27, 1998	Das Trio	Germany	distribution only;
April 24, 1998	The Room of the Scirocco	Italy	theatrical distribution only; produced by Fandango
April 30, 1998	Little Tony (Note: Owned by Fortissimo Films, with Benelux distribution rights licensed to Cinéart)	Netherlands	distribution only; produced by Graniet Film
August 27, 1998	Siberia	Netherlands	distribution only; produced by Siberia Film and NPS
September 23, 1998	Class Trip	France	French and Belgian distribution only; produced by Les Films de la Boissière
November 25, 1998	Les Kidnappeurs	France	distribution only; produced by Productions du Champ Poirier and M6 Films
November 26, 1998	Kai Rabe gegen die Vatikankiller	Germany	co-production with Dreamer Joint Venture Filmproduktion
November 26, 1998	The Flying Liftboy	Netherlands	Benelux distribution under Warner Bros. Family Entertainment only; produced by Bos Bros. Film-TV Productions, Delux Productions and AVRO; Belgian theatrical rights licensed to Jekino-Films.
December 16, 1998	Comme une bête	France	distribution only; produced by Madeleine Films

== 1999 ==
Release Date	Title	Country	Notes
March 25, 1999	Jesus Is a Palestinian	Netherlands	distribution only; produced by Lagestee Film BV and VARA
April 1, 1999	No Trains No Planes	Netherlands	distribution only; produced by Jos Stelling Filmproducties B.V. and VPRO
April 21, 1999	Orfeu	Brazil	distribution only; produced by Rio Vermelho Filmes and Globo Filmes
April 28, 1999	Le Plus Beau Pays du monde	France	distribution only; produced by Septembre Productions
May 7, 1999	Operacja Samum	Poland	distribution only; produced by Studio D.T. Film, HBO and Telewizja Polska
July 15, 1999	Long Hello and Short Goodbye	Germany	co-production with Letterbox Filmproduktion
September 16, 1999	The Delivery	Netherlands	distribution only; produced by Two Independent Film
September 30, 1999	Tobias Totz and his Lion	Germany	distribution in Germany and the Benelux under Warner Bros. Family Entertainment only; co-production with Rothkirch/Cartoon-Film, Munich Animation, Bioskop Film and Stupid Studio
November 10, 1999	Peut-être	France	distribution in France and Switzerland only; produced by Vertigo Productions, PECF, M6 Films and TPS Cinéma
November 18, 1999	'Ne günstige Gelegenheit	Germany	co-production with Studio Hamburg Letterbox Filmproduktion
December 9, 1999	Waschen, Schneiden, Legen	Germany	co-production with Neue Impuls Film
December 17, 1999	Run for Money	Turkey	distribution only; produced by Atlantik Film

== See also ==
- List of Warner Bros. films (1990–1999)
- List of Warner Bros. theatrical animated feature films
