= Hannes Jaenicke =

German actor (born 1960)

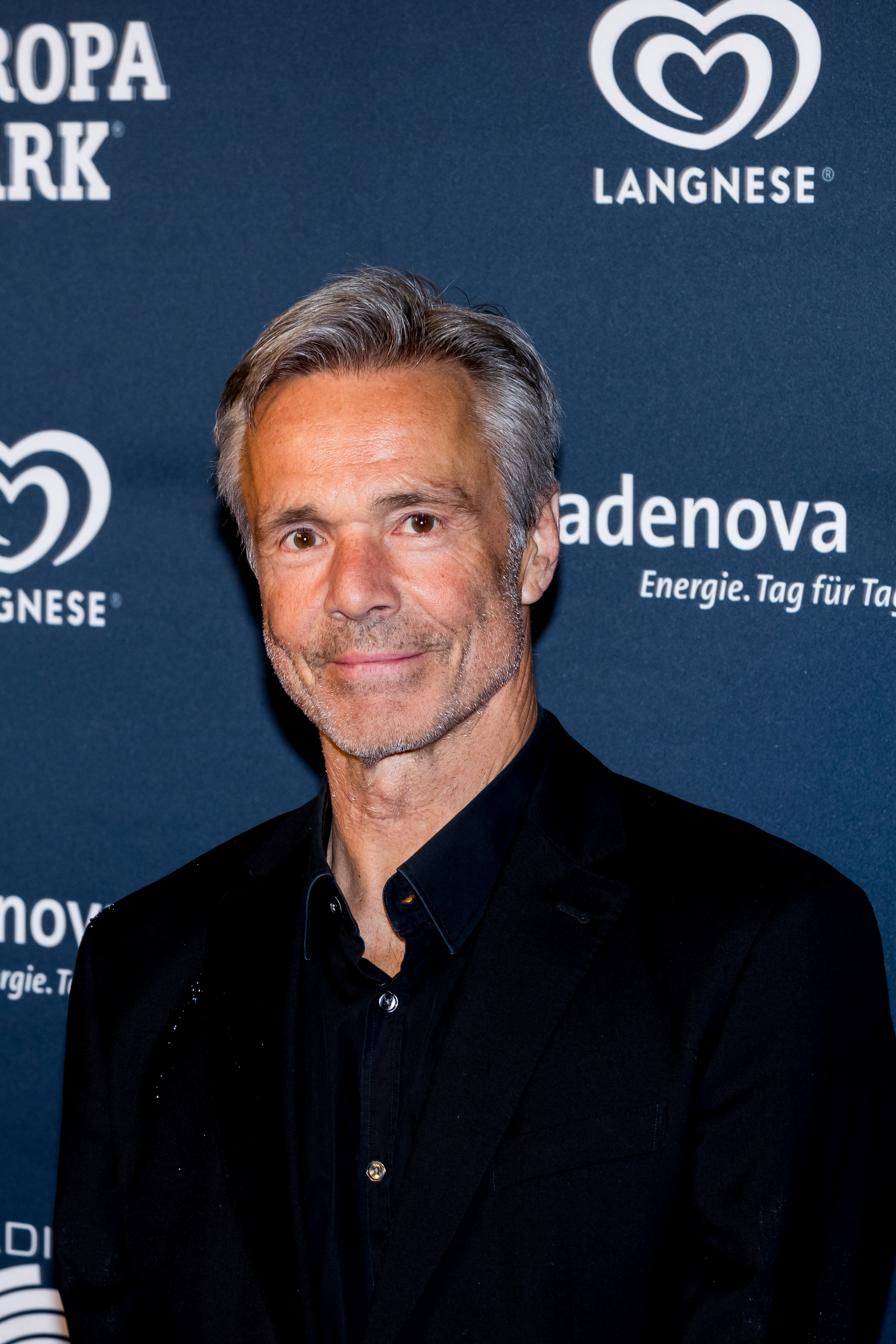
- Jaenicke in 2024.
- Born: 26 February 1960 (age 66); Frankfurt am Main, West Germany
- Occupations: Actor, author
- Years active: 1984–present

Hannes Jaenicke (born 26 February 1960 in Frankfurt am Main) is a German actor, voice actor, audiobook narrator, and author. He has played in various television-programs and movies, including Lost Treasure.

After he was born, Jaenicke and his family moved to Pittsburgh, Pennsylvania. They remained there until he was ten years old.

== Filmography ==
Year	Title	Role	Director	Notes
1983	Abwärts	Pit	Carl Schenkel	
1986	Operation Dead End	Les	Nikolai Müllerschön	
1986	Rosa Luxemburg	Kostja Zetkin	Margarethe von Trotta	
1986	Väter und Söhne – Eine deutsche Tragödie	Max Bernheim	Bernhard Sinkel	TV miniseries
1987	The Crack Connection	Melting	Hajo Gies	
1987	Eine Reise nach Deutschland	Carl	Heidi Genée	TV film
1987	Nebel im Fjord	Rudolf Busch	Eberhard Itzenplitz	TV film
1988	Bei Thea	David Adler	Dominik Graf	TV film
1988	Die Beute	Jansen	Dominik Graf	TV film
1988	Familienschande	Paul Morrison	Franz Peter Wirth	TV film
1988	Stadtromanzen	Hans	Dagmar Brendecke	TV film

Year	Title	Role	Director	Notes
1989	Tam Tam oder Wohin die Reise geht	Rolf Burglehn	Berengar Pfahl	TV film
1989	Silence Like Glass	Ivanov	Carl Schenkel	
1989	Schatten der Wüste	Adam	Jürgen Bretzinger	
1989	Mission Eureka	Stephan	Klaus Emmerich	TV miniseries
1989	Radiofieber	Max	Dietrich Haugk	TV miniseries
1989	Unsichtbare Mauern	Gerhard	Wolfgang Mühlbauer	TV film
1990	Solo für Georg	Markus	Jens-Peter Behrend	TV film
1990	Das Haus am Watt	Max Golborn	Sigi Rothemund	TV film
1990	High Score	Hara	Gustav Ehmck	
1991	L'Alerte rouge	Gunther	Gilles Katz	TV film
1992	Andere Umstände	Rüdiger	Bettina Woernle	TV film
1992	The Tigress	Harry	Karin Howard	
1992	By Way of the Stars	Otto Von Lebrecht	Allan King	TV miniseries
1993	Tödliche Lüge	Dieter Sladko	Ate de Jong	TV film
1993	Heaven!	Ced	Robert Schwentke	Short film
1994	The Invincibles	Heinz Schaefer	Dominik Graf	
1995	Catherine the Great	Peter III of Russia	Marvin J. Chomsky	TV film
1995	5 Stunden Angst – Geiselnahme im Kindergarten	Matthias Koch	Peter Keglevic	TV film
1995	Eine mörderische Liebe	Marcel Vandegen	Friedemann Fromm	TV film
1995	Der Räuber mit der sanften Hand	Siegfried Dennery	Wolfgang Mühlbauer	TV miniseries
1996	Brothers on Life and Death	(Cameo?)	Friedemann Fromm	TV film
1996	Dangerous Dowry	Aleksej	Dennis Satin	
1996	Die Aktion	Paul Gauert	Thomas Bohn	TV film
1996	The Venus Killer	Dr. Klaus Stern	Dominique Othenin-Girard	TV film
1996	The First Time	George	Connie Walther	TV film
1996	Midnight Man	John Engel	Lawrence Gordon Clark	TV film
1997	Knockin' on Heaven's Door	Motorcycle Cop	Thomas Jahn	
1997	Kalte Küsse	Lemmy Kaminski	Carl Schenkel	TV film
1997	Code Red	Stefan Beckmann	Carlo Rola	TV film
1997	Calculated Risk	Ben Wildmann	Michael Kennedy	TV film
1997	The Heist	Jeff	Michael Kennedy	TV film
1997	Bandits	Schwarz	Katja von Garnier	
1997	Bus 152	Markus Voss	Richard Huber	TV film
1998	The Hunted	Jan Kroeger	Stuart Cooper	TV film
1998	Counter Measures	Nikita (uncredited)	Fred Olen Ray	
1998	Gehetzt – Der Tod im Sucher	Frank Bardes	Joe Coppoletta	TV film
1998	Mom's Outta Sight	Dr. John Richards	Fred Olen Ray	
1998	The White Raven	Albert Dockmonish	Andrew Stevens, Jakub Z. Rucinski	
1999	Free Fall	Michael Ives	Mario Philip Azzopardi	TV film
1999	Fallout	Lieutenant Pritch	Rodney McDonald	
1999	Restraining Order	Martin Ritter	Lee H. Katzin	
1999	Active Stealth	Lieutenant "Rif" Rifkin	Fred Olen Ray	
1999	Five Aces	Hustler	David O'Neill	
1999	Snow on New Year's Eve	Zippo	Thorsten Schmidt	
2000	Meet Prince Charming	Ted	Brett Parker	
2000	Nautilus	Dr. Eric Levine	Rodney McDonald	
2000	King of the Korner	Brooke	James Mathers	
2000	Sex oder Liebe?	Frank	Christoph Schrewe	TV film
2000	Submerged	Dr. Kevin Thomas	Fred Olen Ray	
2001	Love Trip	Alex	Richard Huber	TV film
2001	The Diamond Hunters	Hugo Kramer	Dennis Berry	TV film
2001	Crash Point Zero	Julian Beck	Jim Wynorski	
2001	Judas	Joseph of Arimathea	Raffaele Mertes, Elisabetta Marchetti	TV film
2001	Thomas	Joseph of Arimathea	Raffaele Mertes, Elisabetta Marchetti	TV film
2001	Venomous	Dr. Eric Foreman	Fred Olen Ray	
2001	All I Want for Christmas	Robert	Thomas Louis Pröve	TV film
2002	Pretend You Don't See Her	Curtis Caldwell Blake	René Bonnière	TV film
2002	Hanna – Wo bist Du?	Heinz Strom	Ben Verbong	TV film
2002	Strangers	Robert Nicolai	Niki Stein	TV film
2002	Stranded	James McKendrick	Fred Olen Ray	
2002	One Hell of a Night	Wolfgang Herling	Stephan Wagner	TV film
2002	Half Past Dead	FBI Agent Hartmann	Don Michael Paul	
2002	Trenck	Graf Von Jaschinsky	Gernot Roll	TV film
2003	Mama macht's möglich	Philip Gravenhorst	Dirk Regel	TV film
2003	Lost Treasure	Ricardo Arterra	Jim Wynorski	
2003	Die Schönste aus Bitterfeld	Stefan Blum	Matthias Tiefenbacher	TV film
2003	Heimatfilm!	Bernd	Daniel Krauss	
2004	Blast	CEO Heller	Anthony Hickox	
2004	Für immer im Herzen	Dr. Tom Boppard	Miguel Alexandre	TV film
2004	Der Stich des Skorpion	Sebastian Krüger	Stephan Wagner	TV film
2004	So fühlt sich Liebe an	Konrad	Peter Gersina	TV film
2005	Speer und Er	Major Airey Neave	Heinrich Breloer	TV miniseries
2005	One Summer	Tobi Becker	Jan Ruzicka	TV film
2005	Endless Horizon	Dr. Jan Seebach	Thomas Jauch	TV film
2006	The Trojan Cow	Markus	Barbara Stepansky	Short film
2006	Willkommen in Lüsgraf	Manfred	Lars Montag	TV film
2006	Die Pferdeinsel	Nils Peterson	Josh Broecker	TV film
2007	Don't Cry Now	Captain Kessler	Jason Priestley	TV film
2008	Talk to Me	Jan Plathe	Johannes Fabrick	TV film
2009	A Date for Life	Gregor Weller	Andi Niessner	TV film
2009	Zeit für Träume	Christian Johannsen	Karl Kases	TV film
2009	Crash Point: Berlin	Ralf Moldau	Thomas Jauch	TV film
2009	Ceasefire	Ralf	Lancelot von Naso	
2011	Hindenburg: The Last Flight	Gilles Broca	Philipp Kadelbach	TV film
2011	The Mine Sweeper	Mike Mason	Marcus O. Rosenmüller	TV film
2011	Seven Years of Winter	Boris	Marcus Schwenzel	Short film
2011	Bermuda-Triangle North Sea	Tom Jaeger	Nick Lyon	TV film
2012	Willkommen im Krieg	Major Müller	Oliver Schmitz	TV film
2012	World Without End	Roger Mortimer	Michael Caton-Jones	TV miniseries
2012	Whispers of the Desert	Marco	Jörg Grünler	TV film
2012	Lost in Borneo	Alexander Kuhl	Ulli Baumann	TV film
2013	Vier sind einer zuviel	Chris	Torsten C. Fischer	TV film
2013	Einfach die Wahrheit	Rainer Wehling	Vivian Naefe	TV film
2013	Kids Rule	Mattes Wiebeck	Carlo Rola	TV film
2013	Heroes	Marc Weber	Hansjörg Thurn	TV film
2013	Kaiserschmarrn	Acting Teacher	Daniel Krauss	
2013	Weit hinter dem Horizont	Helmut	Stefanie Sycholt	TV film
2014	Wealthy Corpses: A Crime Story from Starnberg	Gerd Sinnern	Dominik Graf	TV film
2014	Hospital in Tents	Dr. Matthias Kreusler	Sebastian Vigg	TV film
2014	… und dann kam Wanda	Karlheinz Kluss	Holger Haase	TV film
2015	Die Udo Honig Story	Franz Kaiser	Uwe Janson	TV film
2016	Die Truckerin	Andy Zweyer	Sebastian Vigg	TV film
2016	A Westerly Wind with Sudden Squalls	Hennes	Dirk Regel	TV film
2016	Männertag	Andi Mauz	Holger Haase	
2017	Bodycheck – Mit Herz durch die Wand	Karl	Holger Haase	TV film
2017	Ein Dorf rockt ab	Mike	Holger Haase	TV film
2017	Mordkommission Königswinkel	Mehringer	Thomas Nennstiel	TV film
2017	Meine fremde Freundin	Volker Lehmann	Stefan Krohmer	TV film
2017	Nicht mit uns! Der Silikon-Skandal	Axel Schwenn	Holger Haase	TV film
2018	Die Liebe deines Lebens	Hagen Stolz	Sebastian Goder	
2018	Einmal Sohn, immer Sohn	Dr. Hufer	Thomas Jauch	TV film
2020	Mirage	Lukas Köhler	Louis Choquette	TV miniseries
2021	Retter der Meere: Tödliche Strandung	Reno Finnings	Sven Fehrensen	TV film
2022	Die Geschichte der Menschheit - leicht gekürzt	Captain Günther Prien	Erik Haffner	

=== TV series episodes ===
Year	Title	Role	Notes
1984	The Old Fox: Die Hellseherin	(Bit part)	
1986	The Old Fox: Der Trugschluss	Manfred Leder	
1986	The Hitchhiker: One Last Prayer	Sean	(as John Cavell)
1986	A Case for Two: T.O.D.	Veith Körner	
1988	Derrick: Kein Risiko	Roland Weimann	
1989	Das Nest: Der Gast	Holger	
1989	Die Männer vom K3: Augen zu und durch	Werner Jansen	
1989	Praxis Bülowbogen: Schuldgefühle	Thomas Speydel	
1992	SOKO München: Der Kuss des Vaters	Salvatore Lorenzo	
1992	Der Fahnder: Baal	Franz Paulus	
1993	The Necklace	Paustowski	2 episodes
1993	Büro, Büro: Kein Grund zum Feiern	Christian Heilmann	Final episode
1994	In dieser Stadt daheim – Regensburger Geschichten	Sam Würzburger	
1995	Tatort: Die Kampagne	Paul Gauert	
1995	Faust: Drei Tage Zeit	Mario Seifert	
1995–1996	Die Straßen von Berlin	Tom Geiger	5 episodes
1996	Due South: Juliet Is Bleeding	Michael Sorrento	
1997–1999	Sardsch	Thomas Kopper	5 episodes
1998	Schimanski: Geschwister	Ewers	
1998–1999	Highlander: The Raven	Bert Myers	7 episodes
1999	Alphamann: Amok	Tom Leschek	
1999	Alphamann: Die Selbstmörderin	Tom Leschek	
2000	Code Name: Eternity	Mike Thorber	4 episodes
2002	Der Solist: Kuriertag	Jahrmann	
2002	Die Cleveren: Der Neurotiker	Christian Brenner	
2003	Tatort: Die Liebe der Schlachter	Hans Pietsch	
2004	Leipzig Homicide: Sansibar	Jürgen Tomczek	
2004	Pfarrer Braun: Der Fluch der Pröpstin	Manuel Castelnuovo	
2004	Tatort: Märchenwald	Tobias Endres	
2005	Tatort: Dunkle Wege	Tobias Endres	
2005	Tatort: Atemnot	Tobias Endres	
2005	Unsolved: Opfergang eines Verlierers	Werner Kolbe	
2006	SOKO München: Wehrlos	Ernst Kallmann	
2007	Kommissarin Lucas: Das Totenschiff	Dr. Peter Sion	
2007–2008	Post Mortem	Dr. Daniel Koch	17 episodes
2007–2014	General Dad	Harald Westphal	5 episodes
2008	Leipzig Homicide: Bernie	Jürgen Tomczek	
2011	Schimanski: Schuld und Sühne	Günther Patzak	
2011	Tatort: Das schwarze Haus	Ruben Rath	
2012	Im Alleingang: Die Stunde der Krähen	Dr. Georg Actis	
2012	Transporter: The Switch	Max Khyber	
2013	Im Alleingang: Elemente des Zweifels	Dr. Georg Actis	
2013–2014	Add a Friend	Ronnie Fischer	3 episodes
2016	Der Urbino-Krimi: Die Tote im Palazzo	Thilo Gruber	
2016	Der Urbino-Krimi: Mord im Olivenhain	Thilo Gruber	
2017	Tatort: Der rote Schatten	Wilhelm Jordan	
Since 2018	Der Amsterdam-Krimi	Alex Pollack	8 episodes
2020	Der Kriminalist: Freunde von früher	Matthias Kaposty	

== Written works ==
- Wut allein reicht nicht. Wie wir die Erde vor uns schützen können. Publisher: Gütersloher Verlagshaus, Gütersloh 2010, ISBN 978-3-579-06761-2.
- Die große Volksverarsche. Wie Industrie und Medien uns zum Narren halten. Publisher: Gütersloher Verlagshaus, Gütersloh 2013, ISBN 978-3-579-06636-3
- Wer der Herde folgt, sieht nur Ärsche. Warum wir dringend Helden brauchen. Publisher: Gütersloher Verlagshaus, Gütersloh 2017, ISBN 978-3-579-08668-2

== Audiobooks ==
- Ian Fleming: Goldfinger, publisher: Random House Audio, 2005, ISBN 978-3-8983-0935-6
- Roger Graf: Philip Maloney, 3 rätselhafte Fälle, publisher: Edition Hörbuch, 2006, ISBN 978-3-8331-0400-8
- Michael Crichton: Gold: Pirate Latitudes, publisher: Random House Audio, ISBN 978-3866049833
- read by the author: Wer der Herde folgt, sieht nur Ärsche: Warum wir dringend Helden brauchen, publisher: Headroom Sound Production, 2017, ISBN 978-3-9421-7587-6
