= Dirk Regel =

German filmmaker (born 1968)

Dirk Regel (born 1968 in Berlin) is a German filmmaker. He worked mainly for comedy films and for television.

== Career ==
After high school Dirk Regel was trained as film editor and assistant director. After that he learned film production. He worked mainly for German TV (e.g. Sat. 1 and ARD) and Austrian TV (e.g. the film Wiener Blut for ORF eins).

He made films of various genres, such as crime films (e.g. for the series Polizeiruf 110, Der Ermittler (The detective), Küstenwache (Coast Guard), and Pfarrer Braun (Priest Braun)). Dirk Regel also made romance films (e.g. Wiedersehen in Verona (Reunion in Verona)), hospital stories (e.g. for the series St. Angela) and family films (e.g. Hilfe, meine Schwester kommt! (Help, my sister comes!)). He made a film adaptation of a tale of Grimm with Die Bremer Stadtmusikanten (The Musicians of Bremen).

He also worked as script-writer with the film Die Unbeugsamen.

In 2002, he received the Deutscher Fernsehpreis (best series) for Edel & Starck (Sat.1, Directors: Dirk Regel, Ulrich Zrenner, Dennis Satin, Jakob Schäuffelen, Matthias Kopp).

== Filmography ==
- Im Namen des Gesetzes (TV series), episode Franziskas Geheimnis (1998)
- St. Angela (TV series), episode Glückskinder (1998)
- Küstenwache (TV series), episode Tödliche Hochzeit (2000)
- Nesthocker – Familie zu verschenken (TV series), episode Reif für die Insel (2000)
- Küstenwache (TV series), episode Hundstage (2000)
- Die Motorrad-Cops – Hart am Limit (TV series), episode Regenzeit (2000)
- Küstenwache (TV series), episode Das letzte Ufer (2000)
- Nesthocker – Familie zu verschenken (TV series), episode Eine für alle (2000)
- Die Motorrad-Cops – Hart am Limit (TV series), episode Ein schlechter Tag (2000)
- Küstenwache (TV series), episode Piraten auf der Ostsee (2000)
- Küstenwache (TV series), episode Dreieck (2001)
- Küstenwache (TV series), episode Zwischen den Fronten (2001)
- Der Ermittler (TV series), episode Alle für einen (2001)
- Edel & Starck (TV series), episode Der Mann (2002)
- Edel & Starck (TV series), episode Hokus, Pokus, Exitus (2002)
- Edel & Starck (TV series), episode Der Mantel des Schweigens (2002)
- Die Verbrechen des Professor Capellari (TV series), episode Bittere Schokolade (2003)
- Lottoschein ins Glück (2003)
- Edel & Starck (TV series), episode Mord ist sein Hobby (2003)
- Mama macht's möglich (2003)
- Edel & Starck (TV series), episode Muffel und Männer (2003)
- Edel & Starck (TV series), episode Eine fast perfekte Ehe (2003)
- Die Verbrechen des Professor Capellari (TV series), episode Ein Toter kehrt zurück (2004)
- Pfarrer Braun (TV series), episode Der Fluch der Pröpstin (2004)
- Pfarrer Braun (TV series), episode Ein verhexter Fall (2004)
- Der Bestseller (TV series), episode Wiener Blut (2004)
- Pfarrer Braun (TV series), episode Adel vernichtet (2005)
- Pfarrer Braun (TV series), episode Bruder Mord (2005)
- Eine Chance für die Liebe (2006)
- Die Unbeugsamen (Direction and script) (2006)
- Wiedersehen in Verona (2007)
- Die Gipfelstürmerin (2007)
- Polizeiruf 110 (TV series), episode Tod in der Bank (2007)
- Zwillingsküsse schmecken besser (2008)
- Hilfe, meine Schwester kommt! (2008)
- Bleib bei mir (2009)
- Mein Nachbar, sein Dackel & ich (2009)
- Oh, What a Mess (2009)
- Acht auf einen Streich (TV series), episode Die Bremer Stadtmusikanten (2009)
- Inga Lindström (TV series), episode Millionäre küsst man nicht (2010)
