= List of Warner Bros. films (1990–1999) =

The following is a list of films originally produced and/or distributed theatrically by Warner Bros. Pictures and released in the 1990s.

== 1990 ==
| Release date | Title | Notes |
|---|---|---|
| February 2, 1990 | Men Don't Leave | distribution only; produced by The Geffen Company |
| February 9, 1990 | Hard to Kill | co-production with Lee Rich Productions |
| March 9, 1990 | Joe Versus the Volcano | co-production with Amblin Entertainment |
| March 16, 1990 | Lambada (Note: Owned by MGM) | theatrical distribution in North America, the U.K., Ireland, Spain, France, Germany and Austria only; produced by Cannon Pictures and Film and Television Company |
| April 6, 1990 | Impulse | |
| June 15, 1990 | Gremlins 2: The New Batch | co-production with Amblin Entertainment |
| July 13, 1990 | Quick Change | |
| July 27, 1990 | Presumed Innocent | co-production with Mirage Enterprises |
| August 17, 1990 | My Blue Heaven | co-production with Hawn/Sylbert Movie Company |
| August 24, 1990 | Dreams | co-production with Akira Kurosawa USA |
| August 24, 1990 | The Witches | distribution outside Australia, New Zealand, Scandinavia and the Benelux only; produced by Lorimar Film Entertainment and Jim Henson Productions |
| September 14, 1990 | White Hunter Black Heart | co-production with Malpaso Productions and Rastar |
| September 19, 1990 | Goodfellas | Inducted into the National Film Registry in 2000 |
| October 5, 1990 | Listen Up: The Lives of Quincy Jones | |
| October 12, 1990 | Memphis Belle | co-production with Enigma Productions |
| October 17, 1990 | Reversal of Fortune | Italian theatrical and North American distribution only; co-production with Edward R. Pressman Productions, Shochiku Fuji Co. Ltd. and Sovereign Pictures |
| November 2, 1990 | Graffiti Bridge | co-production with Paisley Park Films |
| November 21, 1990 | The Nutcracker Prince | U.S. distribution only; produced by Lacewood Productions and Allied Filmmakers |
| December 7, 1990 | The Rookie | co-production with Malpaso Productions |
| December 12, 1990 | The Sheltering Sky | North and Latin American and Scandinavian distribution only; produced by Recorded Picture Company |
| December 14, 1990 | Frankenstein Unbound | international distribution only; produced by the Mount Company and Concorde Pictures (uncredited); U.K. and Irish theatrical rights licensed to Blue Dolphin Film Distribution; distributed in North America by 20th Century Fox |
| December 21, 1990 | The Bonfire of the Vanities | |

== 1991 ==
| Release date | Title | Notes |
|---|---|---|
| January 18, 1991 | Hamlet (Note: Co-owned by Icon Productions, with U.S. distribution rights licensed to Samuel Goldwyn Films) | North American distribution only; produced by Nelson Entertainment, Icon Productions and Carolco Pictures |
| February 8, 1991 | The NeverEnding Story II: The Next Chapter | distribution outside Italy only; produced by CineVox Filmproduktion |
| February 15, 1991 | Nothing but Trouble | co-production with Applied Action |
| March 8, 1991 | New Jack City | co-production with The Jackson/McHenry Company |
| March 15, 1991 | If Looks Could Kill | |
| March 15, 1991 | Guilty by Suspicion | North American, U.K. and Irish distribution only; co-production with Regency Enterprises (uncredited) |
| March 22, 1991 | Defending Your Life | distribution only; produced by Geffen Pictures |
| April 12, 1991 | Out for Justice | co-production with Arnold Kopelson Productions |
| May 3, 1991 | Born to Ride | co-production with Incovent Productions |
| May 10, 1991 | Switch | North American theatrical and free television distribution only; produced by HBO and Cinema Plus L.P. |
| June 7, 1991 | Don't Tell Mom the Babysitter's Dead (Note: HBO has since reclaimed international rights) | North American theatrical and free television distribution only; produced by HBO, Cinema Plus L.P., Mercury/Douglas Films and Outlaw Productions |
| June 14, 1991 | Robin Hood: Prince of Thieves (Note: Co-owned by Morgan Creek Entertainment, with international distribution rights licensed to Revolution Studios, which has sub-licensed television and streaming rights to Sony Pictures) | distribution outside France, the Benelux, Australia, New Zealand, Italy, Scandinavia, Portugal, Spain and Japan only; co-production with Morgan Creek Productions |
| August 2, 1991 | Doc Hollywood | |
| August 2, 1991 | Rover Dangerfield | co-production with Hyperion Pictures and The Kushner-Locke Company |
| August 23, 1991 | Going Under | |
| August 23, 1991 | Showdown in Little Tokyo | |
| October 4, 1991 | Dogfight | |
| October 4, 1991 | Ricochet | North American theatrical and free television distribution only; produced by HBO, Cinema Plus L.P. And Silver Pictures |
| October 18, 1991 | Other People's Money | co-production with Yorktown Productions |
| October 25, 1991 | Curly Sue | co-production with Hughes Entertainment |
| November 8, 1991 | Strictly Business | North American distribution only; co-production with Island World |
| November 15, 1991 | Meeting Venus | co-production with Enigma Productions |
| December 13, 1991 | The Last Boy Scout | distribution only; produced by Geffen Pictures and Silver Pictures |
| December 20, 1991 | JFK (Note: Co-owned by Regency Enterprises) | co-production with Le Studio Canal+, Regency Enterprises, Alcor Films, Ixtlan Corporation and A. Kitman Ho Productions |
| December 25, 1991 | Until the End of the World (Note: Owned by the Wim Wenders Foundation; commercial rights owned by HanWay Films, with U.S. distribution rights currently licensed to Janus Films and The Criterion Collection) | North American distribution only; produced by Road Movies Filmproduktion, Argos Films and Village Roadshow Pictures |

== 1992 ==
| Release date | Title | Notes |
|---|---|---|
| January 17, 1992 | Freejack (Note: Owned by Morgan Creek Entertainment, with international rights licensed to Revolution Studios; home media, television and streaming rights are sub-licensed to Sony Pictures, with select distribution rights also sub-licensed to Relativity Media) | distribution outside the Benelux, Australia, New Zealand, Scandinavia, Portugal, Spain and Japan only; produced by Morgan Creek Productions |
| January 31, 1992 | Hurricane Smith | distribution outside Australia and New Zealand only; co-production with Village Roadshow Pictures |
| February 7, 1992 | Final Analysis | co-production with Witt/Thomas Productions and Roven-Cavallo Entertainment |
| February 28, 1992 | The Mambo Kings | co-production with Le Studio Canal+, Regency Enterprises and Alcor Films |
| February 28, 1992 | Memoirs of an Invisible Man | co-production with Le Studio Canal+, Regency Enterprises and Alcor Films |
| March 27, 1992 | The Power of One | distribution only; produced by Le Studio Canal+, Regency Enterprises, Alcor Films and Village Roadshow Pictures |
| March 27, 1992 | Ladybugs | international distribution outside France, Benelux, Australia, New Zealand, Scandinavia, Portugal, Spain and Japan with Morgan Creek International only; distributed in North America by Paramount Pictures |
| April 24, 1992 | White Sands | distribution outside France, Germany, Austria, the Benelux, Australia, New Zealand, Scandinavia, Portugal, Spain and Japan only; produced by Morgan Creek Productions |
| May 1, 1992 | Turtle Beach (Note: Owned by Regency Enterprises, with Disney (via 20th Century Studios) handling distribution) | North American theatrical and international distribution outside Australia and New Zealand only; produced by Village Roadshow Pictures and Regency International Pictures |
| May 15, 1992 | Lethal Weapon 3 | co-production with Silver Pictures |
| June 5, 1992 | Class Act | co-production with de Passe Entertainment |
| June 11, 1992 | City of Joy | distribution in the U.K., Ireland, Italy, Spain, Scandinavia and Latin America excluding Puerto Rico only; produced by Lightmotive and Allied Filmmakers |
| June 19, 1992 | Batman Returns | co-production with PolyGram Pictures |
| July 24, 1992 | Mom and Dad Save the World | North American theatrical and free television distribution only; produced by HBO, Cinema Plus L.P. and Mercury/Douglas Films |
| August 7, 1992 | Unforgiven | Inducted into the National Film Registry in 2004 co-production with Malpaso Productions |
| August 14, 1992 | Stay Tuned | North and Latin American, U.K., Irish and French distribution only; produced by Morgan Creek Productions |
| August 21, 1992 | Christopher Columbus: The Discovery | North American distribution and Spanish theatrical distribution only |
| September 18, 1992 | South Central | distribution only; produced by Ixtan, Monument Pictures and Enchantment Films |
| September 18, 1992 | Singles | co-production with Knickerbocker Films |
| September 25, 1992 | Innocent Blood | |
| October 9, 1992 | Under Siege | co-production with Regency Enterprises, Le Studio Canal+ and Alcor Films |
| October 23, 1992 | Pure Country | |
| November 6, 1992 | Passenger 57 | |
| November 6, 1992 | The Last of the Mohicans | international distribution outside France, the Benelux, Australia, New Zealand, Scandinavia, Portugal, Spain and Japan with Morgan Creek International only; distributed in North America by 20th Century Fox |
| November 18, 1992 | Malcolm X | Inducted into the National Film Registry in 2010; North American distribution only; co-production with Largo International N.V. and 40 Acres and a Mule Filmworks |
| November 25, 1992 | The Bodyguard | co-production with Tig Productions and Kasdan Pictures |
| December 11, 1992 | Forever Young | co-production with Icon Productions |

== 1993 ==
| Release date | Title | Notes |
|---|---|---|
| February 5, 1993 | Sommersby | distribution only; produced by Le Studio Canal+, Regency Enterprises and Alcor Films |
| February 26, 1993 | Falling Down | co-production with Le Studio Canal+, Regency Enterprises and Alcor Films |
| March 19, 1993 | Point of No Return | |
| April 2, 1993 | The Crush | distribution outside France, Belgium theatrically, Australia, New Zealand, Scandinavia, Portugal, Spain and Japan only; produced by Morgan Creek Productions |
| April 16, 1993 | Boiling Point | North American distribution only; produced by Hexagon Films |
| April 23, 1993 | This Boy's Life | distribution in North America, the U.K., Ireland, France, Germany and Austria only |
| May 7, 1993 | Dave | co-production with Northern Lights Entertainment and Donner/Shuler-Donner |
| May 28, 1993 | Made in America | distribution only; produced by Le Studio Canal+, Regency Enterprises, Alcor Films, Stonebridge Entertainment and Koala Productions |
| June 25, 1993 | Dennis the Menace | distribution under Warner Bros. Family Entertainment only; co-production with Hughes Entertainment |
| July 16, 1993 | Free Willy | distribution under Warner Bros. Family Entertainment only; co-production with Le Studio Canal+, Regency Enterprises, Alcor Films and Donner/Shuler-Donner |
| August 6, 1993 | The Fugitive | co-production with Arnold Kopelson Productions |
| August 6, 1993 | That Night | distribution only; produced by Le Studio Canal+, Regency Enterprises and Alcor Films |
| August 13, 1993 | The Secret Garden | distribution under Warner Bros. Family Entertainment only; co-production with American Zoetrope |
| August 25, 1993 | The Man Without a Face (Note: Owned by Icon Productions, with U.S. distribution rights licensed to Samuel Goldwyn Films) | North American distribution only; produced by Icon Productions |
| September 10, 1993 | True Romance | North American, U.K. and Irish distribution only; produced by Morgan Creek Productions and Davis Films |
| September 17, 1993 | Airborne | North American distribution only; produced by Icon Productions |
| October 1, 1993 | M. Butterfly | distribution only; produced by Geffen Pictures |
| October 8, 1993 | Demolition Man | co-production with Silver Pictures |
| October 15, 1993 | Fearless | co-production with Spring Creek Pictures |
| October 15, 1993 | Mr. Wonderful | North American distribution only; produced by Night Life Inc. and The Samuel Goldwyn Company |
| November 17, 1993 | The Saint of Fort Washington | North American distribution only |
| November 24, 1993 | The Nutcracker | distribution under Warner Bros. Family Entertainment only; produced by Elektra Entertainment and Regency Enterprises |
| November 24, 1993 | A Perfect World | co-production with Malpaso Productions |
| December 17, 1993 | The Pelican Brief | |
| December 17, 1993 | Wrestling Ernest Hemingway | |
| December 25, 1993 | Batman: Mask of the Phantasm | distribution under Warner Bros. Family Entertainment only; co-production with Warner Bros. Animation |
| December 25, 1993 | Grumpy Old Men | co-production with Davis Entertainment and Lancaster Gate |
| December 25, 1993 | Heaven & Earth | co-production with Regency Enterprises, Le Studio Canal+, Alcor Films, Ixtlan and New Regency |

== 1994 ==
| Release date | Title | Notes |
|---|---|---|
| January 28, 1994 | Body Snatchers | |
| February 4, 1994 | Ace Ventura: Pet Detective | distribution outside France, Belgium theatrically, Australia, New Zealand, Italy, Scandinavia, Portugal and Japan only; produced by Morgan Creek Productions |
| February 18, 1994 | On Deadly Ground | co-production with Seagal/Nasso Productions |
| March 4, 1994 | Shadowlands | distribution in Latin America, Germany, Austria, the Benelux and Spain theatrically only; produced by Price Entertainment and Spelling Films International |
| March 11, 1994 | The Hudsucker Proxy | North American and Italian theatrical distribution only; co-production with PolyGram Filmed Entertainment, Silver Pictures and Working Title Films |
| March 30, 1994 | Major League II | distribution outside Australia, New Zealand, Scandinavia, Portugal, Spain and Japan only; produced by Morgan Creek Productions |
| March 30, 1994 | Thumbelina (Note: Owned by Disney (via 20th Century Studios)) | distribution under Warner Bros. Family Entertainment only; produced by Don Bluth Entertainment |
| April 22, 1994 | Chasers | distribution outside Belgium theatrically, Australia, New Zealand, Scandinavia, Portugal, Spain and Japan only; produced by Morgan Creek Productions |
| April 29, 1994 | With Honors | co-production with Spring Creek Pictures |
| May 6, 1994 | Being Human | co-production with Enigma Productions |
| May 6, 1994 | Reckless Kelly | distribution outside Australia and New Zealand only |
| May 20, 1994 | Maverick | co-production with Icon Productions and Donner/Shuler-Donner Productions |
| June 24, 1994 | Wyatt Earp | co-production with Tig Productions and Kasdan Pictures |
| July 20, 1994 | The Client | co-production with Regency Enterprises and Alcor Films |
| July 29, 1994 | Black Beauty | distribution under Warner Bros. Family Entertainment only |
| August 26, 1994 | Natural Born Killers | co-production with Regency Enterprises, Alcor Films, Ixtlan, New Regency and JD Productions |
| August 26, 1994 | Police Academy: Mission to Moscow | |
| September 9, 1994 | Arizona Dream | North American distribution only |
| September 9, 1994 | Rapa Nui | North American distribution only; produced by Tig Productions, Majestic Films International and RCS |
| September 9, 1994 | Trial by Jury | distribution outside Australia, New Zealand, Scandinavia, Portugal, Spain and Japan only; produced by Morgan Creek Productions |
| September 16, 1994 | The New Age | distribution only; produced by Regency Enterprises, Alcor Films and Ixtlan |
| September 30, 1994 | Second Best | distribution only; produced by Regency Enterprises and Alcor Films |
| October 7, 1994 | The Specialist | |
| October 7, 1994 | A Troll in Central Park | distribution under Warner Bros. Family Entertainment only; produced by Don Bluth Entertainment |
| October 14, 1994 | Imaginary Crimes | distribution outside Australia, New Zealand and Italy only; produced by Morgan Creek Productions |
| October 14, 1994 | Little Giants | distribution under Warner Bros. Family Entertainment only; co-production with Amblin Entertainment |
| October 21, 1994 | Love Affair | |
| October 28, 1994 | Silent Fall | distribution outside France, Belgium theatrically, Australia, New Zealand, Scandinavia, Portugal, Spain and Japan only; produced by Morgan Creek Productions |
| November 11, 1994 | Interview with the Vampire | distribution only; produced by Geffen Pictures |
| December 2, 1994 | Cobb | co-production with Regency Enterprises and Alcor Films |
| December 9, 1994 | Disclosure | co-production with Baltimore Pictures and Constant C |
| December 21, 1994 | Richie Rich | distribution under Warner Bros. Family Entertainment only; co-production with Silver Pictures and Davis Entertainment |

== 1995 ==
| Release date | Title | Notes |
|---|---|---|
| January 20, 1995 | Murder in the First | North American distribution only; co-production with Le Studio Canal+ and The Wolper Organization |
| February 3, 1995 | Boys on the Side | distribution only; produced by Le Studio Canal+, Regency Enterprises, Alcor Films, New Regency and Hera Productions |
| February 17, 1995 | Just Cause | co-production with Lee Rich Productions and Fountainbridge Films |
| March 10, 1995 | Outbreak | co-production with Kopelson Entertainment and Punch Productions |
| March 31, 1995 | Born to Be Wild | distribution under Warner Bros. Family Entertainment only; co-production with Fuji Entertainment and Outlaw Productions |
| May 19, 1995 | A Little Princess | distribution under Warner Bros. Family Entertainment only; co-production with Baltimore Pictures |
| June 2, 1995 | The Bridges of Madison County | Nominee of the Golden Globe Award for Best Motion Picture – Drama co-production with Amblin Entertainment and Malpaso Productions |
| June 10, 1995 | The Pebble and the Penguin | international distribution under Warner Bros. Family Entertainment only; produced by Don Bluth Limited; distributed in North America by Metro-Goldwyn-Mayer |
| June 16, 1995 | Batman Forever | co-production with PolyGram Pictures |
| July 14, 1995 | Under Siege 2: Dark Territory | co-production with Regency Enterprises and Seagal/Nasso Productions |
| July 19, 1995 | Free Willy 2: The Adventure Home | distribution under Warner Bros. Family Entertainment only; co-production with Le Studio Canal+, Regency Enterprises, Alcor Films and Shuler-Donner/Donner |
| August 4, 1995 | Something to Talk About | co-production with Spring Creek Pictures and Hawn/Sylbert Movie Company |
| August 25, 1995 | The Amazing Panda Adventure | distribution under Warner Bros. Family Entertainment only |
| September 15, 1995 | The Stars Fell on Henrietta | co-production with Malpaso Productions |
| September 22, 1995 | Empire Records | distribution only; produced by Regency Enterprises and New Regency |
| September 29, 1995 | War of the Buttons | co-production with Enigma Productions, Fujisankei Communications Group, Hugo Films and Les Productions de la Guéville |
| October 6, 1995 | Assassins | co-production with Silver Pictures and Donner/Shuler-Donner |
| October 27, 1995 | Copycat | distribution outside Japan only; produced by Regency Enterprises |
| November 3, 1995 | Fair Game | co-production with Silver Pictures |
| November 3, 1995 | Les Misérables | distribution in North and Latin America, the U.K., Ireland, Australia, New Zealand, Italy, the Benelux, Scandinavia and Asia only; produced by TF1, Canal+ and Les Films 13 |
| November 10, 1995 | Ace Ventura: When Nature Calls | distribution outside France, Belgium theatrically, Australia, New Zealand, Italy, Scandinavia, Portugal and Japan only; produced by Morgan Creek Productions |
| November 17, 1995 | It Takes Two (Note: Owned by Vine Alternative Investments, with distribution rights currently handled by Paramount Pictures) | North American distribution under Warner Bros. Family Entertainment only; produced by Rysher Entertainment and Dualstar Productions |
| December 15, 1995 | Heat | distribution outside Japan and Italy only; co-production with Regency Enterprises and Forward Pass |
| December 22, 1995 | Grumpier Old Men | co-production with Davis Entertainment and Lancaster Gate |

== 1996 ==
| Release date | Title | Notes |
|---|---|---|
| January 12, 1996 | Two If by Sea | distribution outside Belgium theatrically, Australia, New Zealand, Italy, Scandinavia, Portugal, Spain theatrically and Japan only; produced by Morgan Creek Productions |
| January 26, 1996 | Big Bully | distribution outside Australia, New Zealand, Italy, Scandinavia, Portugal, Spain theatrically and Japan only; produced by Morgan Creek Productions and Lee Rich Productions |
| March 15, 1996 | Executive Decision | co-production with Silver Pictures |
| March 22, 1996 | Diabolique | distribution outside France, Belgium theatrically, Australia, New Zealand, Italy, Scandinavia, Portugal, Spain theatrically and Japan only; produced by Morgan Creek Productions and Martin Worth Productions |
| April 5, 1996 | Small Faces | distribution in Scandinavia, the Benelux, Spain, Portugal and South Africa only; produced by BBC Films |
| May 10, 1996 | Twister | North American distribution only; co-production with Universal Pictures and Amblin Entertainment |
| June 21, 1996 | Eraser | co-production with Kopelson Entertainment |
| July 24, 1996 | A Time to Kill | distribution outside Japan only; co-production with Regency Enterprises |
| July 26, 1996 | Joe's Apartment | distribution only; produced by Geffen Pictures and MTV Productions |
| August 16, 1996 | Tin Cup | co-production with Regency Enterprises |
| August 23, 1996 | Carpool | distribution only; produced by Regency Enterprises |
| September 6, 1996 | Bogus | distribution only; produced by Regency Enterprises, Yorktown Productions and New Regency |
| September 6, 1996 | Sweet Nothing | distribution only; produced by Concrete Films |
| September 20, 1996 | Surviving Picasso | co-production with Merchant Ivory Productions and The Wolper Organization |
| September 27, 1996 | The Sunchaser | distribution outside Japan only; produced by Regency Enterprises |
| October 4, 1996 | The Glimmer Man | co-production with Seagal/Nasso Productions |
| October 9, 1996 | The Proprietor (Note: Owned by Cohen Media Group) | distribution only; produced by Merchant Ivory Productions |
| October 11, 1996 | Michael Collins | distribution only; produced by Geffen Pictures |
| October 18, 1996 | Sleepers | North American distribution only; co-production with PolyGram Filmed Entertainment, Propaganda Films and Baltimore Pictures |
| October 25, 1996 | North Star | distribution in North America, the U.K., Ireland, Australia, New Zealand, Germany, Austria, Switzerland and Italy only; produced by Regency Enterprises |
| October 25, 1996 | Thinner | select international distribution only; produced by Spelling Films |
| November 1, 1996 | Bad Moon | distribution only; produced by Morgan Creek Productions |
| November 15, 1996 | Space Jam | distribution under Warner Bros. Family Entertainment only; co-production with Warner Bros. Feature Animation, Northern Lights Entertainment and Courtside Seats Productions |
| December 13, 1996 | Mars Attacks! | |
| December 20, 1996 | My Fellow Americans | co-production with Peters Entertainment and Storyline Entertainment |

== 1997 ==
| Release date | Title | Notes |
|---|---|---|
| February 14, 1997 | Absolute Power | select international distribution only; produced by Castle Rock Entertainment and Malpaso Productions |
| February 14, 1997 | Vegas Vacation | co-production with Jerry Weintraub Productions |
| February 21, 1997 | Rosewood | co-production with Peters Entertainment and New Deal Productions |
| March 21, 1997 | Selena | Inducted into the National Film Registry in 2021 co-production with Q-Productions |
| March 26, 1997 | Cats Don't Dance | North American, Turkish and Japanese distribution under Warner Bros. Family Entertainment only; produced by Turner Feature Animation and David Kirschner Productions |
| April 4, 1997 | Anna Karenina (Note: International rights owned by Icon Entertainment International and Exclusive Media) | North American, U.K. Irish and distribution only; produced by Icon Productions |
| April 18, 1997 | Murder at 1600 | distribution outside Japan only; co-production with Regency Enterprises and Kopelson Entertainment |
| May 9, 1997 | Fathers' Day | co-production with Silver Pictures and Northern Lights Entertainment |
| May 23, 1997 | Addicted to Love | co-production with Outlaw Productions and Miramax Films |
| June 20, 1997 | Batman & Robin | co-production with PolyGram Pictures |
| July 2, 1997 | Wild America | distribution outside Australia, New Zealand, Scandinavia, Portugal, Spain theatrically and Japan only; produced by Morgan Creek Productions and The Steve Tisch Company |
| July 11, 1997 | Contact | co-production with South Side Amusement Company |
| July 30, 1997 | One Eight Seven | North American, U.K. and Irish distribution only; produced by Icon Productions |
| August 8, 1997 | Conspiracy Theory | co-production with Silver Pictures and Shuler Donner/Donner Productions |
| August 8, 1997 | Free Willy 3: The Rescue | distribution under Warner Bros. Family Entertainment only; co-production with Regency Enterprises and Shuler Donner/Donner Productions |
| August 15, 1997 | Steel | co-production with Quincy Jones-David Salzman Entertainment |
| September 5, 1997 | Fire Down Below | co-production with Seagal/Nasso Productions |
| September 19, 1997 | L.A. Confidential | Inducted into the National Film Registry in 2015 distribution outside Japan only; produced by Regency Enterprises |
| September 26, 1997 | Trojan War | co-production with Daybreak |
| October 17, 1997 | Breaking Up | distribution only; produced by Regency Enterprises |
| October 17, 1997 | The Devil's Advocate | distribution outside Japan only; co-production with Regency Enterprises and Kopelson Entertainment |
| November 7, 1997 | Mad City | co-production with Kopelson Entertainment and Punch Productions |
| November 14, 1997 | The Man Who Knew Too Little | distribution only; produced by Regency Enterprises and Polar |
| November 21, 1997 | Midnight in the Garden of Good and Evil | co-production with Malpaso Productions and Silver Pictures |
| December 25, 1997 | The Postman | co-production with Tig Productions |

== 1998 ==
| Release date | Title | Notes |
|---|---|---|
| January 16, 1998 | Fallen | distribution only; produced by Turner Pictures and Atlas Entertainment |
| February 13, 1998 | Sphere | co-production with Baltimore Pictures, Constant C and Punch Productions |
| February 20, 1998 | Dangerous Beauty | North American distribution only; produced by Regency Enterprises, Taurus Film and Bedford Falls Productions |
| March 6, 1998 | U.S. Marshals | co-production with Kopelson Entertainment and Keith Barish Productions |
| March 13, 1998 | Incognito | distribution outside Australia, New Zealand, Scandinavia, Portugal, Spain and Japan only; produced by Morgan Creek Productions |
| April 3, 1998 | The Butcher Boy | Irish film; distribution only; produced by Geffen Pictures |
| April 10, 1998 | City of Angels | co-production with Regency Enterprises, Taurus Film and Atlas Entertainment |
| April 17, 1998 | Major League: Back to the Minors | distribution outside Australia, New Zealand, Scandinavia and Japan only; produced by Morgan Creek Productions |
| April 24, 1998 | Tarzan and the Lost City (Note: Co-owned by Alcon Entertainment) | North American distribution only; produced by Village Roadshow Pictures, Alta Vista and Clipsal Film Partnership |
| May 15, 1998 | Quest for Camelot | distribution under Warner Bros. Family Entertainment only; co-production with Warner Bros. Feature Animation |
| May 28, 1998 | The Last Days of Disco | international distribution outside Australia and New Zealand only; produced by Castle Rock Entertainment; distributed in North America, Australia and New Zealand by PolyGram Filmed Entertainment (through Gramercy Pictures in the United States) |
| May 29, 1998 | Almost Heroes | distribution only; produced by Turner Pictures and Di Novi Pictures |
| June 5, 1998 | A Perfect Murder | co-production with Kopelson Entertainment |
| July 10, 1998 | Lethal Weapon 4 | co-production with Silver Pictures and Doshudo Productions |
| July 29, 1998 | The Negotiator | distribution outside Germany, Austria and Switzerland only; produced by Regency Enterprises, Taurus Film, Mandeville Films and New Regency |
| August 14, 1998 | The Avengers | co-production with Jerry Weintraub Productions |
| August 21, 1998 | Wrongfully Accused | North and Latin American, U.K., Irish and Scandinavian distribution only; produced by Morgan Creek Productions and Constantin Film |
| August 28, 1998 | Why Do Fools Fall in Love | co-production with Rhino Films |
| September 11, 1998 | Without Limits | co-production with Cruise/Wagner Productions |
| October 16, 1998 | Practical Magic | distribution outside Australia, New Zealand, Greece, Cyprus and Singapore only; co-production with Village Roadshow Pictures, Di Novi Pictures and Fortis Films |
| October 23, 1998 | Soldier | distribution outside Germany, Austria, Italy and Spain only; co-production with Morgan Creek Productions, Jerry Weintraub Productions and Impact Pictures |
| November 25, 1998 | Home Fries | co-production with Baltimore Pictures and Kasdan Pictures |
| December 11, 1998 | Jack Frost | co-production with Azoff Entertainment and The Canton Company |
| December 18, 1998 | You've Got Mail | co-production with Lauren Shuler Donner Productions |

== 1999 ==
| Release date | Title | Notes |
|---|---|---|
| February 12, 1999 | Message in a Bottle | distribution outside France, Germany, Austria and Switzerland only; co-production with Bel-Air Entertainment, Tig Productions and Di Novi Pictures |
| February 17, 1999 | Payback | international distribution only; produced by Icon Productions; rights licensed to Nippon Herald Films for Japan, distributed in North America by Paramount Pictures |
| March 5, 1999 | Analyze This | distribution outside Australia, New Zealand, Greece, Cyprus and Singapore only; co-production with Village Roadshow Pictures, NPV Entertainment, Baltimore/Spring Creek Pictures, Face Productions and Tribeca Productions; rights licensed to Nippon Herald Films for Japan |
| March 19, 1999 | The King and I | distribution outside Australia, New Zealand, Scandinavia, Spain theatrical, Portugal and Israel under Warner Bros. Family Entertainment only; produced by Morgan Creek Productions, Rankin/Bass Productions, Nest Family Entertainment and Rich Animation Studios |
| March 19, 1999 | True Crime | co-production with The Zanuck Company and Malpaso Productions |
| March 31, 1999 | The Matrix | Inducted into the National Film Registry in 2012 distribution outside Australia, New Zealand, Greece, Cyprus and Singapore only; co-production with Village Roadshow Pictures, Groucho II Film Partnership and Silver Pictures |
| April 16, 1999 | Goodbye Lover | distribution outside Germany, Austria and Switzerland only; produced by Regency Enterprises, Taurus Film, Gotham Entertainment Group and Lightmotive |
| April 23, 1999 | Lost & Found | distribution only; produced by Alcon Entertainment, Wayne Rice Productions and Dinamo Entertainment |
| June 30, 1999 | South Park: Bigger, Longer & Uncut (Note: Skydance now owns worldwide rights to this film, having acquired Paramount Global in 2025 and Warner Bros. Discovery in 2026.) | international distribution only; co-production with Paramount Pictures, Comedy Central Films, Scott Rudin Productions and Braniff Productions |
| June 30, 1999 | Wild Wild West | co-production with Peters Entertainment, Sonnenfeld-Josephson Worldwide Entertainment and Todman/Simon/LeMasters Productions |
| July 16, 1999 | Eyes Wide Shut | co-production with Stanley Kubrick Productions, Pole Star and Hobby Films |
| July 28, 1999 | Deep Blue Sea | distribution outside Australia, New Zealand, Greece, Cyprus and Singapore only; co-production with Village Roadshow Pictures and Groucho III Film Partnership |
| August 6, 1999 | The Iron Giant | co-production with Warner Bros. Feature Animation |
| August 20, 1999 | Mickey Blue Eyes | distribution in North and Latin America, Scandinavia, Turkey and Asia excluding Japan; produced by Castle Rock Entertainment and Simian Films |
| August 27, 1999 | A Dog of Flanders | North American, U.K. and Irish distribution only; produced by Woodbridge Films |
| September 1, 1999 | Chill Factor | distribution in North and Latin America, the U.K., Ireland, Spain, Eastern Europe and Asia excluding Japan only; produced by Morgan Creek Productions |
| October 1, 1999 | Three Kings | distribution outside Australia, New Zealand, Greece, Cyprus and Singapore only; co-production with Village Roadshow Pictures, Village-A.M. Film Partnership, Coast Ridge Films and Atlas Entertainment |
| October 15, 1999 | The Story of Us | international distribution outside Australia and New Zealand only; produced by Castle Rock Entertainment; distributed in North America, Australia and New Zealand by Universal Pictures |
| October 22, 1999 | Three to Tango | distribution outside Australia, New Zealand, Greece, Cyprus and Singapore only; co-production with Village Roadshow Pictures, Village-Hoyts Film Partnership and Outlaw Productions |
| October 29, 1999 | House on Haunted Hill | North American, Brazilian, U.K. and Irish distribution only; produced by Dark Castle Entertainment |
| November 12, 1999 | Pokémon: The First Movie | distribution outside Asia under Kids' WB/Warner Bros. Family Entertainment only; produced by OLM. |
| November 17, 1999 | Liberty Heights | co-production with Baltimore/Spring Creek Pictures |
| December 10, 1999 | The Green Mile | distribution in North and Latin America, Scandinavia, Turkey and Asia excluding Japan only; produced by Castle Rock Entertainment and Darkwoods Productions |
| December 22, 1999 | Any Given Sunday | co-production with Ixtlan Productions and The Donners' Company; rights licensed to Nippon Herald Films for Japan |
| December 22, 1999 | Man on the Moon (Note: Owned by Universal Pictures) | distribution in South America, France, Italy, the Benelux, Scandinavia, India, Malaysia and Indonesia only; produced by Universal Pictures, Mutual Film Company, Marubeni, Toho-Towa, Tele-München, BBC, UGC-PH and Nordisk Film |

== See also ==
- List of Warner Bros. International films (1990–1999)
- List of New Line Cinema films
- List of films based on DC Comics publications
- List of Warner Bros. theatrical animated feature films
- Category:Lists of films by studio
