= Heinz Hoenig =

German actor (born 1951)

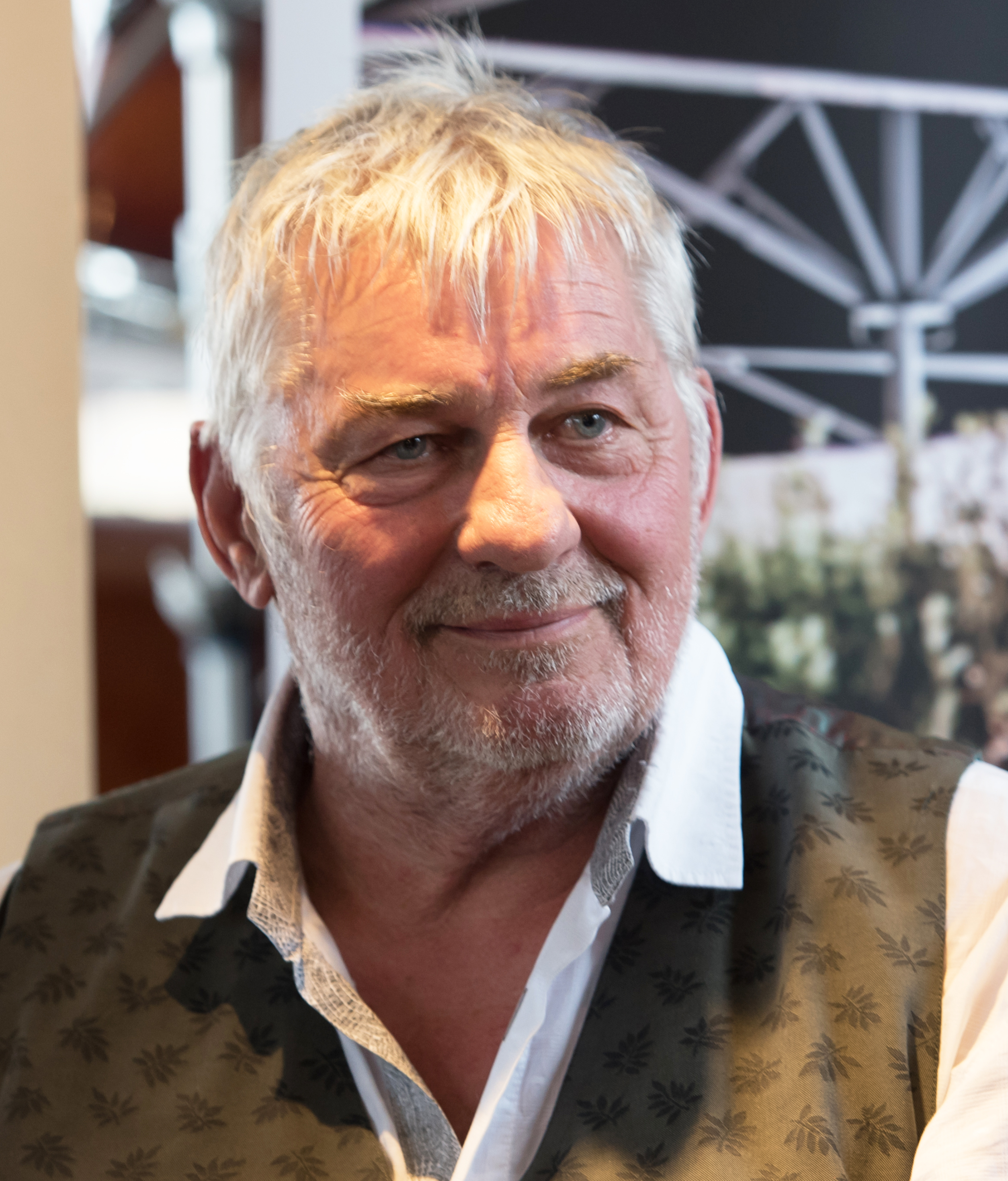
- Heinz Hoenig in 2018
- Born: Heinz Hoenig; 24 September 1951 (age 74); Landsberg am Lech, West Germany
- Citizenship: German
- Occupation: Actor
- Years active: 1974–present

Heinz Hoenig (born 24 September 1951) is a German actor who participated in over 100 feature films and TV productions.

== Filmography ==
- 1975: Under the Pavement Lies the Strand (directed by Helma Sanders-Brahms)
- 1976: Direktion City (TV series)
- 1976: Heinrich (directed by Helma Sanders-Brahms)
- 1977: Pfarrer in Kreuzberg (TV series, directed by Hartmut Griesmayr)
- 1978: Knife in the Head (directed by Reinhard Hauff)
- 1978: Mord am Lietzensee (TV film, directed by Lutz Büscher)
- 1978: Paul kommt zurück (TV film, directed by Peter F. Bringmann)
- 1978: Bares Geld (TV film, directed by Horst Schwaab)
- 1979: Der Tote bin ich (TV film, directed by Alexander von Eschwege)
- 1979: The End of the Rainbow (directed by Uwe Frießner)
- 1980: Tatort: Der Zeuge (TV series, directed by Peter Adam)
- 1980: SOKO 5113: Rosis Brüder (TV series, directed by Ulrich Stark)
- 1981: Das Boot (directed by Wolfgang Petersen)
- 1981: Operation Leo (directed by Hans Hederberg)
- 1982: Be Gentle, Penguin (directed by Peter Hajek)
- 1982: Mit starrem Blick aufs Geld (directed by Helga Reidemeister)
- 1982: Es muß nicht immer Mord sein: Eine Nummer zu groß (TV series, directed by Werner Gronwald)
- 1982: Die Barrikade (TV film, directed by Jürgen Karl Klauß
- 1982: Mamma (directed by Suzanne Osten)
- 1983: Danni (directed by Martin Gies)
- 1983: Krimistunde (TV series, directed by Hartmut Griesmayr)
- 1983: Die leichten Zeiten sind vorbei (directed by Ulli Weiss)
- 1983: Angst vor dem Leben (TV film, directed by Hagen Mueller-Stahl)
- 1985: Ami Go Home oder der Fragebogen (TV film, directed by Rolf Busch)
- 1985: Feel the Motion (directed by Wolfgang Büld)
- 1986: Killing Cars (directed by Michael Verhoeven)
- 1986: Der Drücker (TV film, directed by Uwe Frießner)
- 1986: Dann ist nichts mehr wie vorher (TV film, directed by Gerd Roman Frosch)
- 1988: Stadtromanzen (TV film, directed by Dagmar Brendecke)
- 1988: Judgment in Berlin (directed by Leo Penn)
- 1988: Fifty-Fifty (directed by Peter Timm)
- 1988: Eurocops: Der Schwur (TV series, directed by Bernhard Fischerauer)
- 1988: The Cat (directed by Dominik Graf)
- 1988: Der Fahnder: Der kleine Bruder (TV series, directed by Dominik Graf)
- 1989: The Voice (directed by Gustavo Graef Marino)
- 1989: Bread and Butter (directed by Gabriel Barylli)
- 1989: Tiger, Lion, Panther (directed by Dominik Graf)
- 1989: Reporter (TV series, directed by Klaus Emmerich)
- 1989: Der Leibwächter (TV film, directed by Adolf Winkelmann)
- 1990: The Eighth Day (directed by Reinhard Münster)
- 1990: Harry and Harriet (directed by Cyril Frankel)
- 1990: Herzlich Willkommen (directed by Hark Bohm)
- 1990: Ein Fall für zwei: Vaterliebe (TV series, directed by Michael Mackenroth)
- 1990: Tatort: Rendezvous (TV series, directed by Martin Gies)
- 1990: Abenteuer Airport (TV series, directed by Werner Masten)
- 1991: Der Castillo Coup (TV film, directed by Gabi Kubach)
- 1991: Tatort: Blutwurstwalzer (TV series, directed by Wolfgang Becker)
- 1991: Der Goldene Schnitt (TV film, directed by Bruno Jantoss)
- 1992: Unser Lehrer Doktor Specht (TV series)
- 1992: Ein Fall für Zwei: Scheine spielen Schwarz (TV series, directed by Michael Werlin)
- 1992: Der Fahnder: Bis ans Ende der Nacht (TV series, directed by Dominik Graf)
- 1992: Die Spur führt ins Verderben (TV film, directed by Wolf Gremm)
- 1992: Krücke (directed by Jörg Grünler)
- 1993: The Great Bellheim (TV miniseries, directed by Dieter Wedel
- 1992: Frohes Fest, Lucie (TV film, directed by Roland Suso Richter)
- 1992: Die Angst wird bleiben (TV film, directed by Diethard Klante)
- 1992: Die Männer vom K3: Ein langes Wochenende (TV series, directed by Horst Flick)
- 1992: Lilli Lottofee (TV series, directed by Michael Verhoeven)
- 1993: Einer zahlt immer (TV film, directed by Max Färberböck)
- 1993: Wolffs Revier: Poker (TV series, directed by Michael Lähn)
- 1993: At Your Own Risk (TV series, directed by Dieter Berner)
- 1993: Cliffs of the Death (TV film, directed by Wolf Gremm)
- 1993: Ich klage an (TV film, directed by Frank Guthke)
- 1993: Tatort: Bauernopfer (TV series, directed by Vadim Glowna)
- 1994: The Invincibles (directed by Dominik Graf)
- 1994: Lemgo (TV film, directed by Jörg Grünler)
- 1994: Faust (TV series, episode Inkasso, directed by Ulrich Stark)
- 1994: The Police Murderer (directed by Peter Keglevic)
- 1995: Sylter Geschichten (TV series, directed by Karsten Wichniarz)
- 1995: A.S.: Auf eigene Faust (TV series, directed by Frank Guthke)
- 1995: Ex (TV film, directed by Mark Schlichter)
- 1995: Countdown (Short film, directed by Marcel Kyrill Gardelli, Kamera: Jo an Mey)
- 1995: Inka Connection (TV film, directed by Wolf Gremm)
- 1996: The Shadow Man (TV miniseries, directed by Dieter Wedel)
- 1996: Die Drei: Unschuldig (TV series, directed by Bernhard Stephan)
- 1996: Dangerous Dowry (directed by Dennis Satin)
- 1996: Die Nacht hat 17 Stunden (TV film, directed by Diethard Klante)
- 1996: Life Is a Bluff (directed by Peter Zingler)
- 1996: Die Männer vom K3: Eine saubere Stadt (TV series, directed by Helmut Förnbacher)
- 1996: Der Ausbruch (TV film, directed by Mark Schlichter)
- 1996: Honigmond (directed by Gabriel Barylli)
- 1996: Sardsch (TV series, directed by Axel de Roche)
- 1997: Verdammtes Glück (TV film, directed by Bernhard Stephan)
- 1997: Mayday – Flug in den Tod (TV film, directed by Chris Bould)
- 1997: Forever and Ever (directed by Hark Bohm)
- 1997: Kidnapping – Ein Vater schlägt zurück (TV film, directed by Cincia Th. Torrini)
- 1997: Back in Trouble (directed by Andy Bausch)
- 1997: Ein todsicheres Ding (TV film, directed by Diethard Klante)
- 1998: Sylvia – Eine Klasse für sich (TV series, directed by Erwin Keusch)
- 1998: Stan Becker: Auf eigene Faust (TV series, directed by Frank Guthke)
- 1998: Kai Rabe gegen die Vatikankiller (directed by Thomas Jahn)
- 1998: Tödliche Schatten (TV film, directed by Diethard Klante)
- 1998: S.O.S. Barracuda (TV series, directed by Michel Bielawa)
- 1998: The King of St. Pauli (TV miniseries, directed by Dieter Wedel)
- 1998: Mein Kind muss leben (TV film, directed by Diethard Klante)
- 1999: Zwei Asse und ein König (TV miniseries, directed by Bernd Fischerauer)
- 1999: Stan Becker: Echte Freunde (TV series, directed by Kaspar Heidelbach)
- 1999: Stan Becker: Ein Mann, ein Wort (TV series, directed by Ralph Bohn)
- 1999: Split Second (TV film, directed by Thomas Berger)
- 1999: King of Thieves (directed by Ivan Fíla)
- 2000: Die zwei Leben meines Vaters (TV film, directed by Olaf Kreinsen)
- 2000: Donna Leon: Death and Judgment (TV series, directed by Christian von Castelberg)
- 2000: Stan Becker: Ohne Wenn und Aber (TV series, directed by Hartmut Griesmayr)
- 2001: Deadly Rendezvous (TV film, directed by Wolf Gremm)
- 2001: Liebe und Verrat (TV film, directed by Mark Schlichter)
- 2001: Nicht ohne dich (TV film, directed by Diethard Klante)
- 2002: Die Affäre Semmeling (TV miniseries, directed by Dieter Wedel)
- 2002: Atlantic Affairs (TV film, directed by Hark Bohm)
- 2002: Tatort: Reise ins nichts (TV series, directed by Hartmut Griesmayr)
- 2003: Ein himmlischer Freund (TV film, directed by Karsten Wichniarz)
- 2003: Vera, die Frau des Sizilianers (TV film, directed by Joseph Vilsmaier)
- 2003–2004: Tabaluga und das verschenkte Glück (as Arktos, Live-Tour)
- 2004: 7 Zwerge – Männer allein im Wald (directed by Sven Unterwaldt)
- 2005: Urmel aus dem Eis (TV film, directed by Geriet Schieske)
- 2005: Andersrum (TV film, directed by Heiner Lauterbach, Mark Keller)
- 2005: Antikörper (directed by Christian Alvart)
- 2006: FC Venus (directed by Ute Wieland)
- 2006: Rose unter Dornen (TV film, directed by Dietmar Klein)
- 2006: Papa und Mama (TV miniseries, directed by Dieter Wedel)
- 2006: Der Arzt vom Wörthersee (TV series, directed by Karsten Wichniarz)
- 2006: Die ProSieben Märchenstunde: Rotkäppchen – Wege zum Glück (TV series, directed by Tommy Krappweis)
- 2006: 7 Zwerge – Der Wald ist nicht genug (directed by Sven Unterwaldt)
- 2007: Jump! The Phillipe Halsman Story (directed by Joshua Sinclair)
- 2007: Der Arzt vom Wörthersee: Schatten im Paradies (TV series, directed by Peter Weissflog)
- 2007: Schuld oder Unschuld (TV film, directed by Markus Rosenmüller)
- 2007: Yo (directed by Rafael Cortes)
- 2008: Das Traumschiff: Rio de Janeiro (TV series)
- 2008: Der Arzt vom Wörthersee: Ein Wink des Himmel (TV series, directed by Peter Weissflog)
- 2008: The Last Blast (directed by Sohm Offös)
- 2009: Kopf oder Zahl (directed by Benjamin Eicher, Timo Joh. Mayer)
- 2009: Romy (TV film, directed by Torsten C. Fischer)
- 2009: Karren im Dreck (Short film, directed by Daniel Seideneder)
- 2010: Greed (TV film, directed by Dieter Wedel)
- 2010: Vater Morgana (directed by Till Endemann)
- 2010: Willkommen in Wien (TV film, directed by Nikolaus Leytner)
- 2011: Mord in bester Gesellschaft (TV series)
- 2011: The System (directed by Marc Bauder)
- 2012: Russisch Roulette (TV film, directed by Joseph Vilsmaier)
- 2012: Some Like It Happy (TV film, directed by Florian Gärtner)
- 2012: Der letzte Bulle (TV series)
- 2012: Autumn Child (TV film, directed by Petra Katharina Wagner)
- 2012: Tabaluga und die Zeichen der Zeit (as Arktos, Live-Tour)
- 2012: Das Traumschiff: Puerto Rico (TV series)
- 2013: Das Traumschiff: Malaysia (TV series)
- 2019: The Masked Singer (TV series)

== Accolades ==
- 1982: Deutscher Darstellerpreis category Nachwuchspreis
- 1992: Telestar for Die Angst wird bleiben
- 1993: Deutscher Filmpreis, category Beste darstellerische Leistungen for Krücke
- 1993: Goldener Gong for Einer zahlt immer
- 1996: Bayerischer Fernsehpreis for The Shadow Man
- 1997: Adolf-Grimme-Preis for The Shadow Man
- 1998: Goldene Kamera for The King of St. Pauli
- 1998: Bambi
- 2002: Siegfried-Lowitz-Preis
- 2005: Kinderlachen-Preis
- 2005: Deutscher Comedypreis, category Beste Kino-Komödie
- Ehrenkommissarswürde Bayern

== Discography ==
- 2001: Familienbande
