= Abwärts (film) =

1984 German thriller film

- Theatrical release poster
- Directed by: Carl Schenkel
- Written by: Carl Schenkel; Frank Göhre
- Produced by: Matthias Deyle; Thomas Schühly
- Starring: Renée Soutendijk; Wolfgang Kieling; Hannes Jaenicke
- Cinematography: Jacques Steyn
- Edited by: Norbert Herzner
- Music by: Jacques Zwart
- Distributed by: CineVox Filmverleih
- Release date: 4 May 1984
- Running time: 90 minutes
- Country: West Germany
- Language: German

Abwärts (lit. 'downwards', also known as "Out of Order") is a West German film directed by Carl Schenkel. It was released in 1984.

== Plot ==
Gössmann, a bookkeeper who has just stolen a large sum of money from his employer gets stuck in an elevator of an office tower together with Jörg, the latter's colleague and former lover Marion, and the young Pit. Because it is Friday evening and an engineer working on the elevators made a mistake, the alarm system is not working and nobody can hear them call for help.

Jörg and Pit antagonize each other from the beginning based on their different ages and world views. Gössmann remains quiet in a corner of the cabin, while Marion socializes with Pit and continues her ongoing quarrels with Jörg. After finding a hatch in the ceiling of the cabin, both Jörg and Pit who are the only ones physically fit enough, climb onto the roof of the elevator and attempt to reach an elevator shaft door, but fail.

When Jörg returns the roof a second time alone, he starts to climb and almost falls to death. Meanwhile, Pit and Marion start flirting heavily, and Jörg becomes aware of it when he returns. After suddenly discovering a hidden compartment with a rope in it, Jörg and Pit continue to work together despite the increased tension between them. When Pit is lowered through the elevator shaft on the rope and accidentally slips, he openly accuses Jörg of trying to kill him. Pit starts a fight on the elevator roof, but he slips and falls. Soon Jörg is suspected of having murdered Pit. During an altercation between Jörg and Gössmann, the latter's suitcase busts open revealing over 600,000 marks in cash.

Then finally the malfunction in the alarm system is discovered. Engineers start to rescue the passengers, eventually by lifting them with a rope through the shaft, after they fail to move the cabin with failsafe motors. Pit suddenly reappears after climbing up on a rope which wrapped around his feet before he fell and is rescued first, heavily wounded. Marion and Gössmann are rescued, both without injuries. Jörg, who has minor injuries, is rescued last, just as the last of the steel cables fails and the cabin crashes down. Because he will not let go of Gössmann's suitcase, only grasping the rope with one hand, he falls to his death. At the end, unexplainably, it is revealed that Gössmann's suitcase does not contain money but Gössmann's laundry.

== Cast ==
- Götz George as Jörg
- Hannes Jaenicke as Pit
- Renée Soutendijk as Marion (dubbed by Hannelore Elsner)
- Wolfgang Kieling as Gössmann

== Themes ==
The main theme of the movie is the sudden life-threatening situation unsuspecting people find themselves in the most normal of circumstances on a most usual day. The film also explores the rivalry between men over a woman and being faced with becoming obsolete, either by being fired like Gössmann, who is too old to learn to adapt to computer bookkeeping and apparently also Jörg, being fired for unspecified reasons and losing his lover to another man. The conflicts do not happen independently of a reasonable collective effort to escape the predicament, but they determine the conditions for it, leading to further injuries and death. A story told by Jörg to Pit in the film may be a metaphor for their situation: It is about a man who gets trapped in a refrigeration train car on its journey. He writes down notes of how the cold is killing him slowly and is found dead upon arrival. But the refrigerator was not even turned on.

== Reception ==
The movie was received favourably by both audience and critics. While the characters were criticised as being shallow and stereotypical, the movie itself was called skillful and praised for the way in which it portrayed the characters and their interactions under extreme circumstances. The film received several awards for directing, acting and best camera. It was among a few West German movies to be shown in the German Democratic Republic.
