= Dead Fish =

- DVD cover
- Directed by: Charley Stadler
- Written by: Adam Kreutner; David Mitchell
- Story by: Thomas Geiger; Charley Stadler
- Produced by: David Bergstein; Dan Maag; Matthias Deyle; Philip Schulz-Deyle
- Starring: Robert Carlyle; Gary Oldman; Andrew Lee Potts
- Cinematography: Fraser Taggart
- Music by: Andy Cato
- Distributed by: Image Entertainment
- Release date: 2004
- Running time: 98 minutes
- Country: Germany
- Language: English

Dead Fish is a 2004 English-language German action comedy film starring Robert Carlyle, Gary Oldman, Andrew-Lee Potts, and Elena Anaya.

== Plot ==
Lynch (Gary Oldman), an emotionless food connoisseur, stops a thief who stole a phone from Mimi (Elena Anaya) in a railway station. Falling in for her instantly, he doesn't notice that she accidentally switched phones with him. She later gives Lynch's phone to her boyfriend, Abe Klein (Andrew-Lee Potts) who works as a locksmith. When Lynch's employers try to assign him another assassination over the phone, Abe and his pot-smoking slacker artist friend go to warn the victim, Mr. Fish (Terence Stamp), hoping for a reward.

Concerned by Abe's behaviour over the phone, the employer has another operative, Virgil (Billy Zane), who hasn't met Lynch in person, to check up on him. Virgil has a Czech killer, Dragan (Karel Roden), brought in to deal with "Lynch".

All the while, Danny Devine (Robert Carlyle), a foul-tempered, foul-mouthed loan shark, is driving around trying to collect from various deadbeat clients including Abe.

== Cast ==
- Robert Carlyle as Danny Devine
- Cassandra Bell as "Sugar" Waters
- Gary Oldman as Lynch
- John Pearson as Deck Day
- Kevin McNally as Frank Rosenheim
- Elena Anaya as Mimi
- Andrew Lee Potts as Abe Klein
- Billy Zane as Virgil
- Karel Roden as Dragan
- Terence Stamp as Mr. Fish
- Iddo Goldberg as Thief
- Jimi Mistry as Salvador E. Johnson
- Sebastian Knapp as Megakey Guy
