= Pierre-William Glenn =

French cinematographer and director (1943–2024)

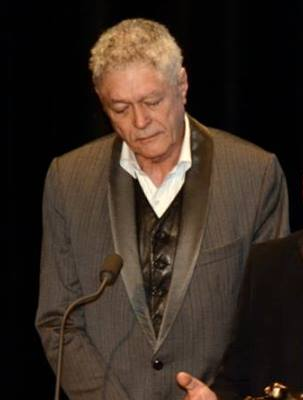
- Glenn in 2014
- Born: 31 October 1943; Paris, German-occupied France
- Died: 24 September 2024 (aged 80)
- Occupation: Cinematographer
- Years active: 1968–2024

Pierre-William Glenn (31 October 1943 – 24 September 2024) was a French cinematographer and film director. He contributed to more than seventy films from 1968 to 2024, including Day for Night and Street of No Return. Glenn died on 24 September 2024, at the age of 80. At age 21, he enrolled at the Institut des hautes études cinématographiques (IDHEC).
