= Restraining Order (film) =

- Directed by: Lee H. Katzin
- Written by: John Jarrell
- Starring: Eric Roberts; Hannes Jaenicke; Tatjana Patitz; Dean Stockwell
- Cinematography: Bryan Greenberg
- Edited by: Brett Hedlund
- Music by: David Wurst; Eric Wurst
- Production companies: Phoenecian Entertainment; Restrained Films Inc. Sat.1
- Distributed by: New City Releasing
- Release date: April 30, 1999
- Running time: 95 minutes
- Country: United States
- Language: English

Restraining Order is a 1999 crime thriller film directed by Lee H. Katzin and starring Eric Roberts and Hannes Jaenicke.

== Cast ==
- Eric Roberts as Robert Woodfield
- Hannes Jaenicke as Martin Ritter
- Tatjana Patitz as Leight Woodfield
- Dean Stockwell as Charlie Mason
- Franc Luz as Craig Dixon
- Sibel Ergener as Joan
