= Mom's Outta Sight =

- Movie Poster
- Directed by: Fred Olen Ray (as Peter Stewart)
- Written by: Sean O'Bannon
- Produced by: Don Key Jr. Andrew Stevens
- Starring: Hannes Jaenicke; Mary Elizabeth McGlynn; Harrison Myers
- Cinematography: Theo Angell
- Edited by: Michael Kuge
- Music by: Jay Bolton (uncredited)
- Distributed by: Don Key Productions Inc.
- Release date: 1998
- Running time: 93 min.
- Country: United States
- Language: English

Mom's Outta Sight is a 1998 American film, starring Hannes Jaenicke, Mary Elizabeth McGlynn and Harrison Myers. It was directed by Fred Olen Ray and written by Sean O'Bannon.

== Plot ==
Professor John Richards designs a contraption which can move objects instantly from one place to another. As the new machine seems like a new success it attracts the attention of Richards' assistant Martin, who wants to steal the new invention and sell it himself.

== Cast ==
- Hannes Jaenicke as Professor John Richards
- Mary Elizabeth McGlynn as Barbara Richards
- Harrison Myers as Jackie Richards
