= Susann B. Winter =

German actress

Susann B. Winter, also known as Susanne Winter and Susan B Winter, is a minor German actress. She has appeared in supporting roles on German television programs before moving on to softcore erotic films such as The Tigress in the 1980s. She appeared in the long-running German police series SOKO 5113. In 2005, she appeared on the popular talk show Gottschalk & Friends.

In October 1984, Winter appeared nude in the German edition of Playboy.
