= The Lightship =

1985 film directed by Jerzy Skolimowski

- Theatrical release poster
- Directed by: Jerzy Skolimowski
- Screenplay by: William Mai; David Taylor
- Based on: The Lightship by Siegfried Lenz
- Produced by: Bill Benenson; Moritz Borman; Matthias Deyle
- Starring: Robert Duvall; Klaus Maria Brandauer; Badja Djola; Arliss Howard; William Forsythe
- Cinematography: Charly Steinberger
- Edited by: Scott Hancock; Barrie Vince
- Music by: Stanley Myers
- Production company: CBS Theatrical Films
- Distributed by: Castle Hill Productions
- Release date: September 26, 1985
- Running time: 89 minutes
- Country: United States

The Lightship is a 1985 American drama film directed by Jerzy Skolimowski. The film stars Klaus Maria Brandauer and Robert Duvall, with early appearances by Arliss Howard and William Forsythe. It entered the main competition at the 42nd Venice International Film Festival.

The film is based on the novella "Das Feuerschiff" ("The Lightship" in German) by German author Siegfried Lenz which had previously been made into a German film of the same title in 1963. It was shot in the Sylt Island, in West Germany.

The film was the last made by CBS Theatrical Films, which went out of business in November 1985. The film was distributed by Castle Hill Productions just nine months after the closure of the studio.

== Plot ==
The story follows the crew of a small ship run by a man named Miller. Sailing out to sea, the ship is taken over by three criminals, one of them named Caspary. Just when they think they are safe, the criminals find themselves battling the crew for control of the vessel.

The conflict between the captain (Brandauer) and his son is an important part of the plot. The son wants to subdue the criminals, Captain Miller is against the idea. His son sees this as cowardice, but in reality Miller feels protecting the crew is more important than apprehending the criminals.

== Cast ==
- Robert Duvall as Caspary
- Klaus Maria Brandauer as Capitan Miller
- Badja Djola as Nate
- Arliss Howard as Eddie
- William Forsythe as Gene
- Tim Phillips as Thorne
- Tom Bower as "Coop" Cooper
- Michael Lyndon as Alex
- Robert Costanzo as "Stump"
