= Valentina Vargas =

Chilean actress

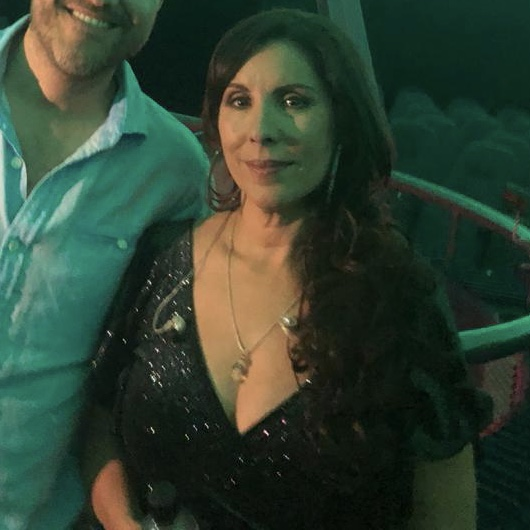
- Valentina Vargas in 2018
- Born: December 31, 1964 (age 61); Santiago, Chile
- Occupation: Actress

Valentina Vargas (born December 31, 1964) is a Chilean actress. She began, and spent most of, her career working in France.

== Biography ==
Vargas began her career in the dramatic arts by joining the workshop of Tania Balaschova in Paris and later at the Yves Pignot School in Los Angeles. Her cinematographic career started with the filming of three works in contemporary French cinema, specifically Pierre Jolivet's Strictly Personal (1985), director Luc Besson's Big Blue (1988) and Jean-Jacques Annaud's The Name of the Rose (1986). As the 1980s and 1990s continued, Vargas continued to work in film. She appeared in Samuel Fuller's Street of No Return (1989), Miguel Littín's Los náufragos (1994) and Alfredo Arieta's Fuegos.

Vargas is multilingual, speaking Spanish, French and English. This has enabled her to star in films as varied as the cinematic horror film Hellraiser: Bloodline where she played the demon Angelique, to the comedy Chili con carne of Thomas Gilou. She appeared opposite Jan Michael Vincent (Dirty Games), Malcolm McDowell and Michael Ironside (Southern Cross), and James Remar (The Tigress).

After her performance in the horror-comedy Bloody Mallory (2002), where she played "the malicious one", she began playing roles for television as well as film. She appeared in a TV miniseries version of Les Liaisons dangereuses directed by Josée Dayan. She also starred in the production alongside Catherine Deneuve, Rupert Everett, Leelee Sobieski and Nastassja Kinski.

== Filmography ==
- Strictement personnel (1985) as La masseuse
- The Name of the Rose (1986) as The Girl
- Fuegos (1987) as Margarita
- The Big Blue (1988) as Bonita
- Dirty Games (1989) as Nicola Kendra
- Street of No Return (1989) as Celia
- The Tigress (1992) as Tigress / Pauline
- The Devil's Breath (1993)
- Twin Sitters (1994) as Lolita
- The Shipwrecked (1994) as Isol
- Hellraiser: Bloodline (1996) as Peasant Girl / Angelique / Angelique Cenobite
- Southern Cross (1999) as Mariana Flores
- Chili con carne (1999) as Ines
- Bloody Mallory (2002) as Lady Valentine
- All Inclusive (2008) as Carmen
- Ilusiones ópticas (2009) as Rita
- Faces in the Crowd (2010) as Nina
- Night Across the Street (2012) as Nigilda
- Johnny 100 Pesos: Capítulo Dos (2017) as María Francisca
- The Four Altars (2023) as Doña Sofía

=== Television ===
- Le flair du petit docteur (1 episode, 1986) as Laure
- Piazza Navona (1 episode, 1988) as Perla
- Air America (1 episode, 1999) as Celia
- L'Été de Chloé (2002) as Agnès
- Un homme en colère (1 episode, 2002) as Laura
- Les Liaisons dangereuses (2003) (miniseries) as Emilie
- Le Caprice des cigognes (2006) as Anna
- Fête de famille (5 episodes, 2006) as Monica
- Héroes (2007) (episode: "Balmaceda") as Sofía Linares
