= Lost Treasure (film) =

- Theatrical release poster
- Directed by: Jim Wynorski (Jay Andrews)
- Written by: Harris Done; Diane Fine
- Produced by: Paul Hertzberg
- Starring: Stephen Baldwin; Nicollette Sheridan; Coby Ryan McLaughin
- Cinematography: Andrea V. Rossotto
- Edited by: Michael Kuge
- Music by: Neal Acree
- Production company: CineTel Films
- Distributed by: DEJ Productions
- Release date: November 25, 2003
- Running time: 90 minutes
- Country: United States
- Language: English

Lost Treasure is a 2003 action film starring Stephen Baldwin, Nicollette Sheridan and Coby Ryan McLaughlin. It was written by Harris Done and Diane Fine and directed by Jim Wynorski under the pseudonym Jay Andrews. This movie is about a treasure hunt on a tropical island. The plot involves a treasure supposedly hidden by Columbus. The map that leads to it was split into two halves, so that one would need both pieces to find it.

== Plot ==
A painting is stolen from a building during a great fire and after it is recovered, the police find inside a mysterious map. A police officer responsible for the case asks his brother (Stephen Baldwin), who is an antiques expert, to help him during the investigation. Analysing the paint and fabric, they find that the map belonged to Christopher Columbus and the drawings in it refer to an old legend of a lost treasure. Besides unraveling the mysterious riddles, the police officer and his brother will have to fight off a violent gang pursuing the treasure as well.

== Cast ==
- Stephen Baldwin as Bryan McBride
- Nicollette Sheridan as Carrie
- Coby Ryan McLaughlin as Detective Carl McBride
- Hannes Jaenicke as Ricardo Arterra
- Jerry Doyle as Detective Sean Walker
- Mark Christopher Lawrence as Danny "Danny G"
- Scott L. Schwartz as Joe "Crazy Joe"
- Tami-Adrian George as Tammy

== See also ==
- List of American films of 2003
