= Walter Serner =

German-language writer and essayist

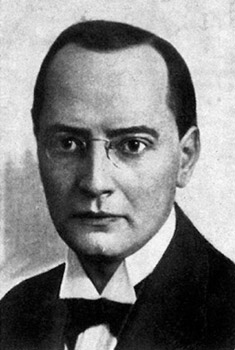
Walter Serner

Walter Serner (15 January 1889 – August 1942) was a German-language writer and essayist. His manifesto Letzte Lockerung was an important text of Dadaism.

== Life ==
Walter Serner was born Walter Eduard Seligmann in Carlsbad (Karlovy Vary), Bohemia (then Austria-Hungary, now Czech Republic). In 1913 he studied law in the Austro-Hungarian capital of Vienna and completed his doctorate in the University of Greifswald.

With the outbreak of World War I, he escaped to Switzerland in 1914 and participated in Dada activities in Zurich, Geneva, and Paris until 1920. During World War I he was the editor of the magazines Sirius and Zeltweg and a writer for Die Aktion. In 1921 Serner stayed in Italy with the artist Christian Schad. Beginning in 1923 he began living in various European cities, including Barcelona, Bern, Vienna, Carlsbad, and Prague.

From 1925, Serner became the target of anti-Semitism. Serner had been born Jewish and had converted to Catholicism in 1913.

His play Posada premiered in Berlin in 1927, but his other planned shows were forbidden. In 1933 Serner's books were banned by the government of Nazi Germany.

In 1938 Serner married his partner Dorothea Herz in Prague, where he was working as a private teacher. When war broke out, they had no chance to escape from the occupied country. In 1942 he and his wife were interned in the Theresienstadt concentration camp and three weeks later were moved in the direction of "the East", where they perished in Riga.

Walter Serner's most successful novel Die Tigerin (The Tigress) was made into an English-language feature film by writer/director Karin Howard and released in 1992. At that time the novel was re-published in Germany where Serner's books enjoy a cult following. The film was shot in Berlin and Carlsbad.

== Work ==
=== Lifetime publications ===
- Letzte Lockerung. manifest dada. Hannover / Leipzig / Wien / Zürich: Steegemann, 1920
- Zum blauen Affen. Dreiunddreißig hanebüchene Geschichten. Hannover: Steegemann, 1921
- Der elfte Finger. Fünfundzwanzig Kriminalgeschichten. Hannover: Steegemann, 1923
- Der Pfiff um die Ecke. Zweiundzwanzig Spitzel- und Detektivgeschichten. Berlin: Elena Gottschalk, 1925
- Die Tigerin. Eine absonderliche Liebesgeschichte. Berlin: Gottschalk, 1925
- Die tückische Straße. Neunzehn Kriminal-Geschichten. Wien: Dezember, 1926
- Posada oder Der Große Coup im Hotel Ritz. Ein Gauner-Stück in drei Akten. Wien: Dezember, 1926

=== Latest publications ===
- Angst. Frühe Prosa. Erlangen: Renner, 1977
- Hirngeschwür. Texte und Materialien. Walter Serner und Dada. Erlangen: Renner, 1977
- Wong fun. Kriminalgeschichte. Augsburg: Maro, 1991

=== Collected editions ===
- Das gesamte Werk. Band 1-8, 3 Supplementbände. Hrsg.: Thomas Milch. Erlangen, München: Renner, 1979–1992
  - Bd. 1: Über Denkmäler, Weiber und Laternen. Frühe Schriften (1981)
  - Bd. 2: Das Hirngeschwür. DADA (1982)
  - Bd. 3: Die Tigerin. Eine absonderliche Liebesgeschichte (1980)
  - Bd. 4: Der isabelle Hengst. Sämtliche Kriminalgeschichten I (1979)
  - Bd. 5: Der Pfiff um die Ecke. Sämtliche Kriminalgeschichten II (1979)
  - Bd. 6: Posada oder der große Coup im Hotel Ritz. Ein Gaunerstück in drei Akten (1980)
  - Bd. 7: Letzte Lockerung. Ein Handbrevier für Hochstapler und solche die es werden wollen (1981)
  - Bd. 8: Der Abreiser. Materialien zu Leben und Werk (1984)
  - Bd. 9 = Supplementbd. 1: Die Haftung des Schenkers wegen Mängel im Rechte und wegen Mängel der verschenkten Sache (1982)
  - Bd. 10 = Supplementbd. 2: Das fette Fluchen. Ein Walter Serner-Gaunerwörterbuch (1983)
  - Bd. 11 = Supplementbd. 3: Krachmandel auf Halbmast. Nachträge zu Leben und Werk (1992) (sehr versch. Texte, Dokumente und Abb. von und über W. S., Dada, Christian Schad u. a., mit Erl.)
- Gesammelte Werke in zehn Bänden. Hrsg. von Thomas Milch. München: Goldmann, 1988
  - Bd. 1: Über Denkmäler, Weiber und Laternen. Frühe Schriften (enthält den Supplementband 1 der Renner-Ausgabe)
  - Bd. 2: Das Hirngeschwür. DADA
  - Bd. 3: Zum blauen Affen. Dreiunddreißig Kriminalgeschichten
  - Bd. 4: Der elfte Finger. Fünfundzwanzig Kriminalgeschichten
  - Bd. 5: Die Tigerin. Eine absonderliche Liebesgeschichte
  - Bd. 6: Der Pfiff um die Ecke. Zweiundzwanzig Kriminalgeschichten
  - Bd. 7: Posada oder der große Coup im Hotel Ritz. Ein Gaunerstück in drei Akten
  - Bd. 8: Die tückische Straße. Neunzehn Kriminalgeschichten
  - Bd. 9: Letzte Lockerung. Ein Handbrevier für Hochstapler und solche die es werden wollen
  - Bd. 10: Der Abreiser. Materialien zu Leben und Werk (enthält den Supplementband 2 der Renner-Ausgabe)
- Sprich deutlich. Sämtliche Gedichte und Dichtungen. Hrsg.: Klaus G. Renner. München: Renner, 1988
- Das Walter-Serner-Lesebuch. Alle 99 Kriminalgeschichten in einem Band. München: Goldmann, 1992
- Das erzählerische Werk in drei Bänden. Hrsg.: Thomas Milch. München: Goldmann/btb, 2000, ISBN 3-442-90259-2
  - Bd. 1: Zum blauen Affen / Der elfte Finger
  - Bd. 2: Die Tigerin
  - Bd. 3: Der Pfiff um die Ecke / Die tückische Straße
