= Matthias Deyle =

German film producer

Matthias Deyle is a German film producer.

== Filmography ==
- Love, Vampire Style (1970)
- Hanna von acht bis acht (1983, TV film)
- Kinder unseres Volkes (1983, TV film)
- Abwärts (1984)
- The Lightship (1985)
- Die Küken kommen (1985)
- Der Junge mit dem Jeep (1986, TV film)
- Hatschipuh (1987)
- Sentimental Journey (1987, TV film)
- Pizza-Express (1988, TV film)
- Rosamunde (1990)
- Aus heiterem Himmel (1995, TV series)
- Polizeiruf 110: Der schlanke Tod (1996, TV series episode)
- Die Sexfalle (1997, TV film)
- Polizeiruf 110: Todsicher (1998, TV series episode)
- Force Majeure (2000, TV film)
- The Calling (2000)
- Slap Her... She's French (executive, 2002)
- K-19: The Widowmaker (2002)
- The Quiet American (2002)
- Terminator 3: Rise of the Machines (2003)
- Alexander (2004)
- The Aviator (2004)
- Dead Fish (2005)
- Basic Instinct 2 (2006)
- RV (2006)
