= Street of No Return =

1989 film

- Directed by: Samuel Fuller
- Written by: Jacques Bral; Samuel Fuller
- Starring: Keith Carradine; Valentina Vargas
- Cinematography: Pierre-William Glenn
- Edited by: Jacques Bral
- Music by: Kodu Kumar
- Distributed by: BAC Films
- Release date: 6 July 1989
- Running time: 93 minutes
- Country: France
- Language: English

Street of No Return is a 1989 French crime film co-written and directed by Samuel Fuller, based on the 1954 novel with the same title written by David Goodis. Fuller's final theatrically released film before his death, it stars Keith Carradine and Valentina Vargas.

== Plot ==
Michael (Keith Carradine), a crowd-pleasing singer meets a flashy young woman, Celia (Valentina Vargas), whom he forgets was featured in a video for one of his songs (the film's title track, co-written by Carradine and Fuller). Their passionate affair is truncated by Celia's lover, Eddie (Marc de Jonge), a drug dealer who foments racial antagonism as part of a scheme to buy up valuable real estate. Eddie slits Michael's throat, thereby ending his career and initiating his descent into vagrancy and alcoholism. Arrested for the murder of a policeman, Michael eventually convinces the irate chief of police (Bill Duke) of Eddie's involvement. Violent retribution follows.

== Cast ==
- Keith Carradine as Michael
- Valentina Vargas as Celia
- Bill Duke as Lieutenant Borel
- Andréa Ferréol as Rhoda
- Bernard Fresson as Morin
