= St. Angela (TV series) =

- Country of origin: Germany

Original release
- Release: 1997 – 2005

St. Angela is a German television hospital drama series. First aired in 1997 on Das Erste's early evening program. It was produced by Rhinestone TV Productions GmbH in Hamburg. The final season aired in 2005.

== See also ==
- List of German television series
