= Dangerous Dowry =

- Theatrical release poster
- Directed by: Dennis Satin
- Written by: Dennis Satin
- Produced by: Vesna Jovanoska
- Starring: Katja Riemann; Hannes Jaenicke; Heinz Hoenig
- Cinematography: Jörg Widmer
- Edited by: Dennis Satin
- Music by: Brynmor Jones
- Production companies: Ena Film; Warner Bros. Film Gmbh
- Distributed by: Warner Bros.
- Release date: 18 April 1996
- Running time: 103 minutes
- Country: Germany
- Language: German
- Budget: $3 million

Dangerous Dowry (German: Nur aus Liebe) is 1996 German action thriller film written and directed by Dennis Satin starring Katja Riemann, Hannes Jaenicke and Heinz Hoenig.

The film was produced by Ena Film and Warner Bros. Film Gmbh and it was released by Warner Bros. on 18 April 1996. It was Warner's first locally co-produced film for the German market.

== Cast ==
- Katja Riemann as Ella
- Hannes Jaenicke as Aleksej
- Heinz Hoenig as Jewgenij
- Daniela Lunkewitz as Carmen
- Guido Föhrweißer as Mischa
- Werner Daehn as Wanja
- Christoph M. Ohrt as Andi
- Ingo Naujoks as Fendel
- Walter Spiske as Rentler
- Thorsten Nindel as Benny
