= Benefit of the Doubt (1993 film) =

German thriller directed by Jonathan Heap

- Film poster
- Directed by: Jonathan Heap
- Written by: Jeffrey Polman; Christopher Keyser
- Story by: Michael Lieber
- Produced by: Dieter Geissler; Brad M. Gilbert; Michael Spielberg
- Starring: Donald Sutherland; Amy Irving; Graham Greene
- Cinematography: Johnny E. Jensen
- Edited by: Sharyn L. Ross
- Music by: Hummie Mann
- Production companies: CineVox Filmproduktion; Benefit Productions; Monument Pictures
- Distributed by: Warner Bros.
- Release date: 17 June 1993
- Running time: 91 minutes
- Country: Germany
- Language: English

Benefit of the Doubt (German: Im Bann des Zweifels) is a 1993 English-language German thriller film directed by Jonathan Heap and starring Donald Sutherland and Amy Irving.

It was released in the United States by Miramax Films on July 16, 1993, marking the first film to be released by Miramax after being acquired by The Walt Disney Company although its VHS release was still handled by Paramount Home Entertainment. Disney would continue to distribute Miramax's films for the next 17 years, ending with The Switch on August 20, 2010, before Disney sold the company to Filmyard Holdings that same year on December 3.

== Plot ==
Karen, a life-weary single-mother and waitress finds her life disrupted when her father, Frank, is finally released after 20 years in the State Pen. It was she who provided the key testimony that had him convicted of uxoricide. She still believes he did it, but is unable to remember the exact details of the traumatic event. This thriller chronicles the events that follow her father's return.

First of all he begins ingratiating himself with her young son and her lover. Angered, she confronts him, but finds him too persuasively charming to stay angry. He then convinces her that her memory is faulty and that her mother died accidentally. She believes him and accepts him back. The tale takes a much darker turn, when her father begins isolating her from her friends and dominating her life. It is soon after she announces her intent to marry Dan that a new string of killings begin. Around that time certain events trigger Karen's dormant memories and she realizes that she knows the truth about her father.

== Cast ==
- Donald Sutherland as Frank
- Amy Irving as Karen Braswell
- Rider Strong as Pete Braswell
- Christopher McDonald as Dan
- Graham Greene as Calhoun
- Theodore Bikel as Gideon Lee
- Gisela Kovach as Suzanna
- Ferdy Mayne as Mueller
- Julie Hasel as Young Karen Braswell
- Patricia Tallman as Karen's Mother
- Ralph McTurk as Trooper
- Shane McCabe as Wayland

== Production ==
Parts of the film were shot at Glen Canyon in Utah as well as Camp Verde, Clarkdale, Cottonwood and Sedona in Arizona.
