= Moon 44 =

1990 film by Roland Emmerich

- Theatrical release poster
- Directed by: Roland Emmerich
- Screenplay by: Dean Heyde; Oliver Eberle
- Story by: Roland Emmerich; Oliver Eberle; Dean Heyde; P. J. Mitchell
- Produced by: Dean Heyde; Roland Emmerich
- Starring: Michael Paré; Lisa Eichhorn; Dean Devlin; Brian Thompson; Stephen Geoffreys; Jochen Nickel; Leon Rippy; Malcolm McDowell
- Cinematography: Karl Walter Lindenlaub
- Edited by: Tomy Wigand
- Music by: Joel Goldsmith
- Production company: Centropolis Entertainment
- Distributed by: CineVox Film GmbH (through Warner Bros.)
- Release date: 15 February 1990
- Running time: 98 minutes
- Country: West Germany
- Language: English
- Budget: $2.5 million

Moon 44 is a 1990 English-language West German science fiction action film directed, produced, and co-written by Roland Emmerich. It stars Michael Paré, Lisa Eichhorn, Malcolm McDowell, Brian Thompson, and Dean Devlin.

The film is set on a futuristic mining site on Moon 44, where convicts and teenage technicians are partnered. An undercover agent (Paré) must discover what has happened to missing corporate shuttles.

It was produced by Centropolis Entertainment, and released in West Germany on February 15, 1990. In the United States, the film was released direct-to-video. It received mixed-to-negative reviews.

== Plot ==
By 2038, all of Earth's natural resources have been depleted. Multinational corporations have taken control of the galaxy and rival companies battle each other for access to mining planets. A major battle is for Moon 44, a fuel mining operation in the Outer Zone. It is the only installation still controlled by the Galactic Mining Corporation. Moons 46, 47 and 51 have recently been overtaken by the Pyrite Defense Company's battle robots. Galactic Mining had its own defense system, helicopters capable of operating in the violent atmospheres of the moons, but it was cancelled as too many pilots died while in training. The company sends new navigators to Moon 44 to assist the pilots. However, there is still a shortage of pilots, so the company is forced to use prisoners. Galactic Mining regards its fleet of mining shuttles as even more important, so if the base is attacked, the shuttles are ordered to leave the crews behind.

Galactic Mining hires Felix Stone, an undercover agent, to investigate the disappearance of two shuttles that went missing under mysterious circumstances. Stone travels to Moon 44 and meets chief navigator Tyler, who suspects the shuttles were stolen by somebody after they modified the flight computers. The mining operation's defence director, Major Lee and his assistant, Master Sergeant Sykes are the prime suspects. Stone later catches Sykes reprogramming a mining shuttle shortly before its departure. Sykes attacks Stone with an axe, but is quickly gunned down by Lee, who then refuses to hand over the modified computer to Stone, citing "company orders".

Having concluded his investigation, Stone prepares to leave, but the mining operation is attacked by a Pyrite Medusa-class battle cruiser. Major Lee sabotaged the alarm systems and then orders all of the mining shuttles to return to Earth. Stone manages to single-handedly shoot down the entire first wave of enemy attack drones, while prisoner O'Neal stays behind to destroy the remaining drones as Lee's actions at the base are discovered.

Lee tries to sabotage the last remaining mining shuttle, but he is trapped in an elevator by Stone and blown up by his own bomb. The others return safely to Earth, where Stone informs the Galactic Mining chairman that Lee was bribed by Pyrite to redirect the mining shuttles to a planet in the Outer Zone.

== Cast ==
- Michael Paré as Felix Stone
- Lisa Eichhorn as Terry Morgan
- Dean Devlin as Tyler
- Brian Thompson as Jake O’Neal
- Leon Rippy as Master Sergeant Sykes
- Stephen Geoffreys as "Cookie"
- Malcolm McDowell as Major Lee
- Jochen Nickel as "Scooter" Bailey
- Roscoe Lee Browne as Chairman Hall

== Production ==
Filming took place primarily in the Swabian town of Sindelfingen using old factory buildings as shooting locations. Production took place over the course of ten weeks from December 1988 through February 1989 primarily using a warehouse that belonged to director Roland Emmerich's father that was used for his furniture business. Packing materials for the furniture were incorporated into the set dressing and according to Michael Paré the spaceships were made of styrofoam packing.

Additional filming took place at the Ennis House in Los Angeles, California, as the Galactic Mining corporate office. Emmerich secured financing on the film by selling distribution rights to foreign territories. The film was shot by cinematographer Karl Walter Lindenlaub and scored by composer Joel Goldsmith. It was filmed in color with Dolby Stereo sound. Moon 44 is the first collaboration between Devlin and Emmerich. Emmerich ran out of money before he could shoot an important establishing shot, so he improvised using mirrors and the production crew as extras.

== Release ==
Moon 44 was released in West Germany on February 15, 1990. The film was released direct-to-video in the United States on January 24, 1991.

== Reception ==
In a contemporary review, Variety referred to the film as "boring, uneventful" and "feeble sci-fi effort from West Germany".

Time Out wrote that "the film looks nice but unoriginal ... the model work is okay but laboured; the acting is stunningly mediocre." TV Guide rated it 1/5 stars and wrote, "It's eye-filling, to say the least, but there's not much tension or sense of danger." Kim Newman of Empire rated it 2/5 stars and wrote, "The plot unravels in unwieldy dollops, and, despite some adequate special effects (for the time), the whole thing is really a bit of a bore."

Upon viewing Moon 44, producer Mario Kassar was impressed enough to invite Roland Emmerich to Hollywood and ended up hiring him to direct Universal Soldier.
