= Carl Schenkel =

Swiss film director (1948–2003)

- Born: 8 May 1948; Bern, Switzerland
- Died: 1 December 2003 (aged 55); Los Angeles, California, United States
- Occupations: Film director, screenwriter
- Years active: 1979–2001
- Known for: Abwärts (Out of Order)

Abwärts logo

Carl Schenkel (8 May 1948 – 1 December 2003), also known by the pseudonym Carlo Ombra, was a Swiss film director and screenwriter. He began his career in Germany and achieved his breakthrough with the 1984 thriller Abwärts (Out of Order), which became his biggest success. He later worked in the United States, including for HBO.

== Life and career ==
Carl Schenkel was born in Bern on 8 May 1948. Before entering film, he considered a career in journalism and began writing for newspapers at 16, including articles and film reviews for a local newspaper. He moved to Frankfurt in 1968 to study sociology and economics, supporting himself in part through work for a press agency. While studying there, he also began developing material for advertising productions.

Schenkel entered filmmaking through assistant-director work during the 1970s. After assisting Wolfgang Staudte on Lockruf des Goldes (1975), he relocated to Munich, where Sigi Rothemund became an important influence on his early career. In Munich, his early film work also included second-unit directing on larger productions. His work with Rothemund included Griechische Feigen (1977) and Timm Thaler (1980). Schenkel first directed under the name Carlo Ombra with Graf Dracula (beißt jetzt) in Oberbayern (1979), before making Kalt wie Eis (1981) under his own name.

Schenkel's breakthrough came with Abwärts (Out of Order) (1984), a thriller centred on four people trapped in an elevator in a Frankfurt office building. Schenkel both directed the film and wrote its screenplay. The film was well received and brought him directing awards at both the Bavarian Film Awards and the Sitges Film Festival. Parts of Abwärts were filmed in an actual elevator shaft in a Frankfurt office building. It was regarded as his biggest success and quickly established his reputation as a director in Germany.

The success of Abwärts led to opportunities in the United States, including an approach from HBO, and Schenkel subsequently relocated there. Schenkel's American productions included Knight Moves, Tarzan and the Lost City and Bay Coven. Among his films, Knight Moves (1991) was his biggest box-office success, drawing around two million admissions in Germany. His drama Zwei Frauen was nominated for the German Film Award in 1990. Schenkel concluded his directing career with a 2001 television adaptation of Agatha Christie's Murder on the Orient Express, with Alfred Molina as Hercule Poirot.

He died of heart failure in Los Angeles on 1 December 2003, aged 55 and was later buried in Switzerland.

== Selected filmography ==
A selection of Schenkel's films as director includes:

- Graf Dracula (beißt jetzt) in Oberbayern (1979)
- Kalt wie Eis (1981)
- Abwärts (1984)
- Bay Coven (1987)
- Zwei Frauen (1989)
- Knight Moves (1991)
- Exquisite Tenderness (1994)
- Tarzan and the Lost City (1997)
- Feindliche Übernahme – althan.com (2000)
- Murder on the Orient Express (2001)
