= The Tigress (1992 film) =

1992 film

- Theatrical release poster
- German: Die Tigerin
- Directed by: Karin Howard
- Written by: Karin Howard
- Based on: Die Tigerin by Walter Serner
- Starring: James Remar; Valentina Vargas; Hannes Jaenicke
- Cinematography: Lothar Elias Stickelbrucks
- Edited by: Norbert Herzner
- Music by: Loek Dikker
- Distributed by: CineVox (through Warner Bros.)
- Release date: 15 October 1992
- Running time: 83 minutes
- Country: Germany
- Language: English

The Tigress (German: Die Tigerin) is a 1992 German film directed and written by Karin Howard, and based on Walter Serner's novel. It marked George Peppard's final film role. The film follows a penniless con man (James Remar), who teams up with the eponymous prostitute (Valentina Vargas).

== Plot ==
In a sordid night club in 1920s Berlin, the penniless con man Andrei catches the eye of the fiery whore Pauline, known as The Tigress. Underworld boss Harry considers her his property, but she spends the next two days in bed with Andrei. To escape Harry's revenge, the two disappear to neighbouring Czechoslovakia and book into a hotel in the resort of Carlsbad. They have the jewels Pauline has accumulated during her career, which are used to buy smart clothes and attend smart evenings in the casino. Andrei promotes himself to a baron and introduces Pauline as a film star, stressing that they are not married (and privately stressing to Pauline that this is all a business venture and he is not going to fall in love with her). She soon acquires admirers, an Austrian count and a Texan oil man. Playing them off against each other, she eventually succumbs to the Texan, who is by far the richer. Andrei's plan is to burst in and challenge the Texan to a duel, confident that the man would rather pay a large amount of money than lose his life, but on barging into the room he discovers Pauline has vanished. She has been tipped off by a friend in Berlin that Harry is on a train to find her. Unaware of this, Andrei goes to the station and is spotted by Harry, who starts shooting at him. Jumping onto a moving train, Andrei is robbed of all he has by some villains and thrown out beside a road. Along the road comes Pauline, looking for him because she has been in love with him all along.

== Cast ==
- Valentina Vargas as Tigress / Pauline
- James Remar as Andrei
- George Peppard as Sid Slaughter
- Ferdy Mayne as Austrian Count
- Belinda Mayne as Elsy
- Hannes Jaenicke as Harry
- René Schoenenberger as Count Beowulf
- Jiří Krytinář as Bellboy #1
- Marek Maly as Bellboy #2
- Götz Hellriegel as Max
- Michael Basden as Louis Lumier
- Andreas Grothusen as Egon
- Christian Maria Goebel as Rudi
- Gerhard Bös as Fritz
- Oliver Konrad-Gerbig as Paul
- Burkhardt Brildigkeit as Musician
- Mirco Schurig as Musician
- Michael Stobbe as Musician
- Morris Perry as Walker
- Thomas Petruo as Barkeeper
- Harald Pilar von Pilchau as Dancer #1
- Ulf Garritzmann as Dancer #2
- Marcus Bier as Walter Serner
- Monica Gruber as Female Barkeeper
- Janusz Cichock as Armenian
- Georg Tryphon as Jeweller
- Horst Ehbauer as Clown
- Jennifer Rose as Girl
- Adrian Noack as Boy
- Lutz Stückrath as Cab Driver
- Eva Mannschott as Count's Daughter
- Lorose Keller as Count's Wife
- Susann B. Winter as Maid With Yellow Cap
- Arne Nannestad as Pat Cooper
- Petr Lepša as Maitre D'
- Ben Posener as Coke / Emil
- Jaroslav Tesitel as Desk Clerk
- Ivo Niederle as Salesman In Pawn Shop
- Lutz Stückrath as Cab Driver
- Hans-Dieter Brückner as Bum #1
- Frank Kirschgens as Bum #2
