= CineVox =

German film and TV production company

CineVox Filmproduktion GmbH
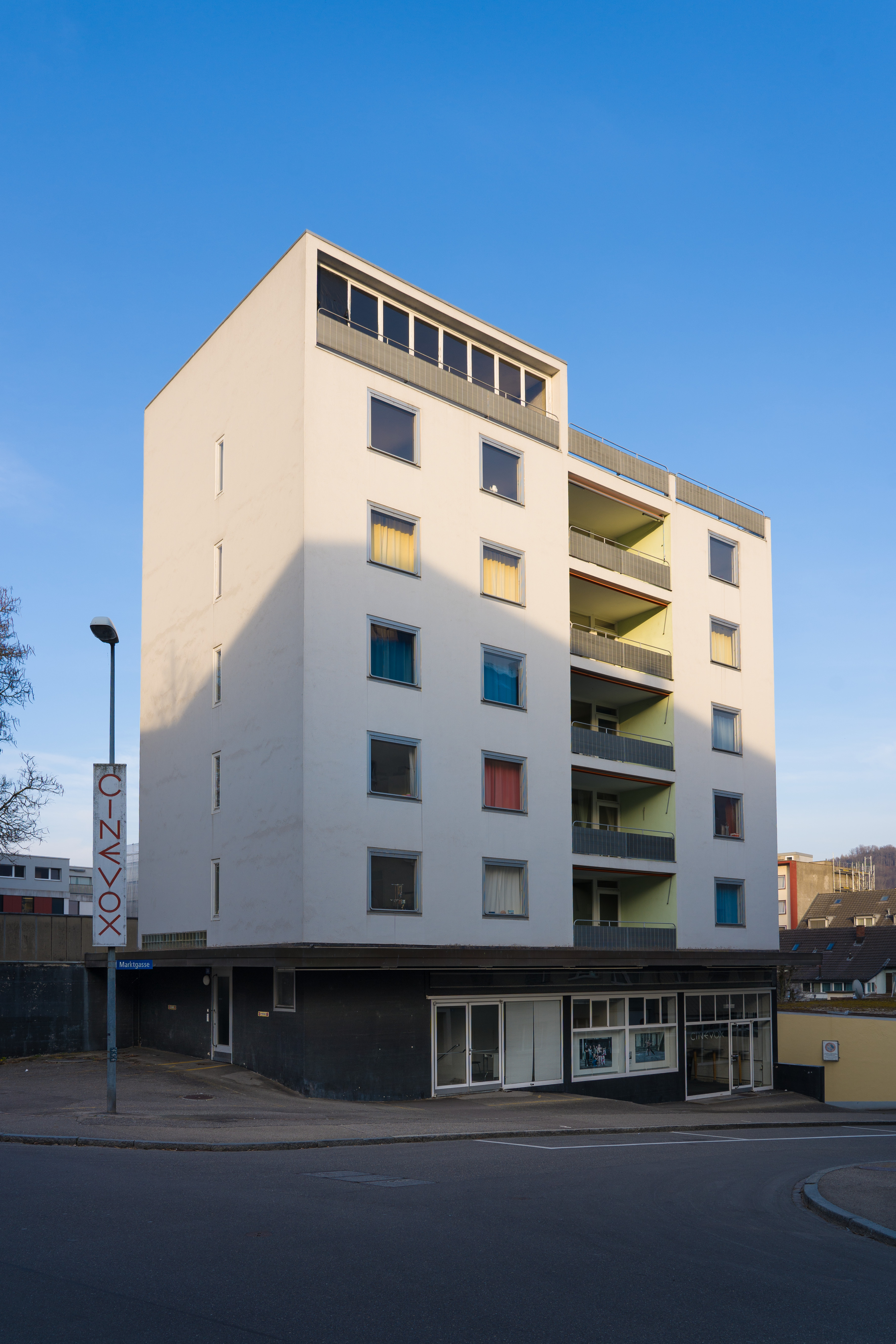
- Founded: 1980; 46 years ago
- Defunct: 1999; 27 years ago
- Fate: Liquidation
- Headquarters: Munich, Germany; Neuhausen am Rheinfall, Switzerland
- Products: The NeverEnding Story II; Benefit of the Doubt

CineVox Filmproduktion GmbH was a film and television production company founded by Dieter Geissler based in Germany, operating from 1980 to 1999. The company's theatrical releases were handled by Warner Bros. in Germany, France and the United Kingdom. Prior to its liquidation, all rights were transferred to other companies within the CineVox Entertainment Group which has branches in Munich, London and Los Angeles.

== Productions ==
=== Produced ===
- Egon Schiele – Exzess und Bestrafung (1980)
- A Woman in Flames (1983)
- Abwärts (1984)
- The NeverEnding Story II: The Next Chapter (1992)
- Knight Moves (1992)
- The Tigress (1992)
- Benefit of the Doubt (1993)
- The NeverEnding Story III (1994)
- The Adventures of Pinocchio (1996)

=== Distributed ===
- Raw Deal (1986)
- Personal Services (1987)
- Maximum Overdrive (1987)
- The Care Bears Adventure in Wonderland (1987, with Warner Bros.)
- Buster (1988, with Warner Bros.)
- Moon 44 (1990, with Warner Bros.)
- Caruso Pascoski, Son of a Pole (1988, with Warner Bros.)
- Teenage Mutant Ninja Turtles (1990, with Warner Bros.)
- The Fourth War (1990, with Warner Bros.)

=== Television ===
- The Neverending Story (1995-1996)
