= Dennis Satin =

German film director and screenwriter (born 1968)

Dennis Satin (born February 18, 1968, Sofia, Bulgaria) is a German film director and screenwriter. He became internationally recognized for the film Dangerous Dowry (1996), as director and screenwriter; starring: Katja Riemann and Hannes Jaenicke.

As director and screenwriter he worked for the successful television-series Wilsberg, an adaptation of the novels of the German author Jürgen Kehrer (starring: Leonard Lansink and Rita Russek) and for two of its sequels Wilsberg: Der Minister und das Mädchen (The Minister and the Girl, 2004) as also Wilsberg und die Tote im See (Wilsberg: Death Woman at the Lake, 1999).

In addition he worked as director for the cinema-movie Helden und andere Feiglinge (Heroes and Other Cowards, 1998) and as director for different sequels of German crime-thriller TV-series like Doppelter Einsatz.

Dennis Satin was born in the Bulgarian capital, Sofia, and grew up in Kassel, Hessen. He started his film career at a young age, when he served as a camera-assistant. Today he lives in Cologne.
